= Aroha Kaikorai Valley =

Environmental charitable trust in Dunedin, New Zealand

- Aroha Kaikorai Valley Trust
- Founded: 2022; 4 years ago
- Founder: Paul Southworth
- Type: Charitable trust
- Registration no.: CC59873
- Purpose: Looking after the Kaikorai catchment through community-led action on plants, predators, water and air quality
- Location: Bradford, Kaikorai Valley, Dunedin, New Zealand
- Region served: Kaikorai Valley, Dunedin, New Zealand
- Website: https://akv.nz/

Aroha Kaikorai Valley (AKV) is a registered charitable trust, located in Bradford, Kaikorai Valley, Dunedin, New Zealand. It was established in 2022 to improve the ecological health of the Kaikorai catchment through community-led pest control, native planting, waterway restoration, and air quality monitoring.

== History ==
The trust was founded by local businessman Paul Southworth following clean‑ups near his Turboweb business. When Southworth and his staff moved into their premises at 381 Kaikorai Valley Road, they found the adjacent bank overgrown with gorse, scrub and broom and littered with discarded household rubbish, and the building itself was plagued by rats. Cleaning up this site and witnessing ongoing dumping near the Kaikorai Stream sparked the idea of a wider environmental initiative to improve the valley's natural environment.

What started as informal restoration work in the vicinity of Turboweb quickly expanded into coordinated community efforts involving rubbish removal, weed control, native planting and predator trapping. Residents began hosting traps on their properties as part of early pest-control activities.

The charitable trust was officially launched in June 2023 at an event held at Kaikorai Valley College, attended by around 50 people. At the launch, Southworth described the trust's initial focus on “water, plants and predators,” and outlined plans to implement coordinated environmental projects across the valley.

Soon after its formation, the trust secured funding from the Otago Regional Council EcoFund to establish a predator-trapping network targeting possums, rats, mice, hedgehogs and mustelids throughout the Kaikorai Valley catchment.

In 2025, the organisation developed and began promoting the Business+ programme, a pilot educational initiative aimed at engaging local businesses in practical environmental action, with workshops on predator control, water quality and catchment stewardship.

The trust's activities also attracted support from other community groups; for example, the Town Belt Kaitiaki donated additional pest traps to the organisation to aid its work in protecting native wildlife.

Since its foundation, Aroha Kaikorai Valley has grown beyond its origins as a single cleanup project into a structured community-led organisation focused on restoring the ecological health of the Kaikorai Valley catchment through rubbish clean-ups, predator control, native planting and water and air quality monitoring.

== Mission ==
AKV's mission focuses on five major areas:

- People: Bringing the community together around a common goal
- Plants: Replacing weeds with native species and significant trees
- Predators: Reducing invasive mammals to protect native wildlife
- Water: Improving water quality in Kaikorai Stream to the estuary
- Birds: Enhancing native bird habitats

== Activities ==
AKV's programmes include:

- Predator and Pest Control: Deployment of traps and coordination with landowners to reduce invasive species.
- Waterway Restoration: Stream clean-ups, monitoring, and ecological restoration.
- Native Planting: Removing invasive plants and establishing native vegetation.
- Air Quality Monitoring: Community-driven monitoring using deployed sensors.
- Community Engagement: Education and business programmes such as Business+ to involve the wider community in environmental action.

== Recognition ==
On 17 August 2024, AKV was highly commended for the Taylor Community Pride Shield at the Keep Dunedin Beautiful Awards.

On 17 August 2025, AKV was awarded the Taylor Community Pride Shield at the Keep Dunedin Beautiful Awards, recognising its work in pest control, stream restoration, rubbish removal, planting, and air quality monitoring.

== Sister project ==
Aroha Kaikorai Valley is affiliated with Aroha Cambridge, a registered charitable trust in Cambridge, New Zealand, established in July 2025. Aroha Cambridge supports community-led predator control, native planting, and waterway restoration, and receives guidance from AKV in areas such as branding, documentation, and health and safety.

== Governance ==
AKV is governed by a board of trustees:

- Paul Southworth – Chair
- Simon McMillan – Trustee
- Bob Brown – Trustee
- Sarah Alice Moffitt – Trustee
- Barb Long - Trustee

== See also ==
- Environmental organisations in New Zealand
- Kaikorai Stream
