= Kaikorai Stream =

River in Dunedin, New Zealand

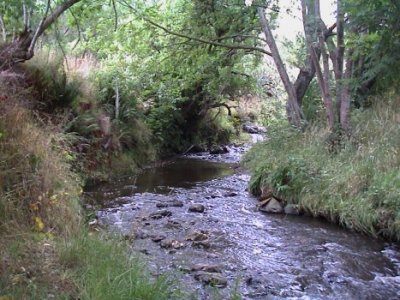
- Kaikorai Stream, Dunedin
- Route of the Kaikorai Stream
- Mouth of the Kaikorai Stream Kaikorai Stream (South Island)
- Native name: Kaikarae (Māori)

Location
- Country: New Zealand

Physical characteristics
- Source: Wakari
  - location: Otago Golf Club
  - coordinates: 45°51′19″S 170°29′37″E
- Mouth
  - location: Otago Harbour
  - coordinates: 45°55′57″S 170°23′25″E
  - elevation: 0 m (0 ft)

Basin features
- Progression: Kaikorai Stream → Pacific Ocean
- Tributaries
  - right: Frasers Creek, Abbots Creek, Christies Creek, Coal Creek, Finnies Creek

The Kaikorai Stream is a short river which runs through the city of Dunedin, in New Zealand's South Island. The stream has origins in the northwestern suburbs of Dunedin, flowing southwest towards the Kaikorai Lagoon.

Originally named Kaikarae by Ngāi Tahu Māori referencing an event where the stream was a place where petrels were caught and eaten, the stream became highly modified during European settlement, and developed a reputation for poor water quality.

== Etymology ==
The name 'Kaikorai' is a corruption of 'kai karae', Māori for 'eating petrels', referring to a Māori explorer whose party is said to have eaten these seabirds while camping at the mouth of the stream. The first references in print media to the Kaikorai Stream date from 1851.

The stream does not have an official name but "official" maps name Fraser's Creek as Kaikorai Stream and do not give any label to the watercourse through Balmacewen. A 2013 Land Information New Zealand report on misspelt names suggests the name "should be Kaikarae", and in 2023, the name Kaikarae was recorded as a collected name for the stream, as a part of the Te Waipounamu tangata whenua place names map project, in collaboration with Ngāi Tahu.

New Zealand Company surveyor Frederick Tuckett named the stream "Green River" in 1844, probably related to the nearby offshore Green Island (Ōkaihae) and the suburb of the same name.

== Geology ==
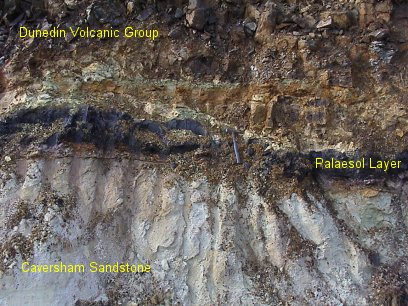
Geological strata by stream

The stream cuts through late Cretaceous-Tertiary sedimentary and igneous rocks and Quaternary floodplain conglomerate and colluvium. In the area of Kaikorai Valley College the bedrock is the Altonian (Lower Miocene) (c.17 Ma millions years ago) Caversham Sandstone.

== Course ==
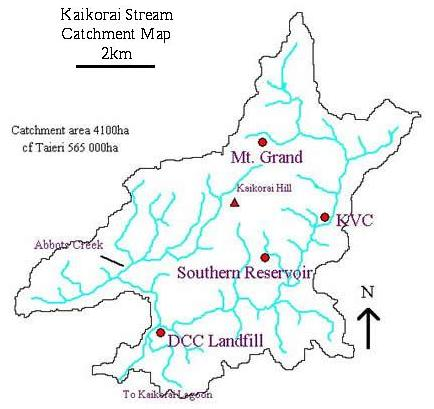
The Kaikorai water catchment

The stream drains the south eastern and eastern slopes of Flagstaff, Kaikorai Hill and the Balmacewen area, flows through Kaikorai Valley and Green Island and empties into Kaikorai Estuary. The water catchment area is 4,100 hectares (10,000 acres) and has about 15,000 residents. There are two branches both sometimes known as 'Kaikorai Stream'.

=== Balmacewen ===
The branch of the Kaikorai Stream which flows through Balmacewen has its source in the Otago Golf Club's Balmacewen Golf Course. From here the stream flows mainly through culverts below Bishopscourt—a group of playing fields used by the Kaikorai Rugby Football Club—and an intermediate school. This part of the stream is sometimes incorrectly called "School Creek", which is the name of a nearby tributary of Ross Creek.

Below Bishopscourt, the culvert opens into a stream through the Shetland St Community Garden and Kaikorai Common. On either side are a retirement village and the Āraiteuru Marae. In a 2025 public statement to the local city council the marae identified the stream as their "awa" and that its "...degradation is a disgrace and stands in direct opposition to [their] values and responsibilities...".

A pond and areas of swamp and forest and a community garden have been developed here in a wetland conservation project of the Dunedin Environment Centre Trust. This land was originally intended for a highway linking Kaikorai Valley to Leith Valley and the Dunedin Northern Motorway.

Work was carried out in 1925 to pipe the "unsightly" stream through the suburb of Kaikorai, past the Kaikorai Presbyterian Church and beneath social housing built on the former Kaikorai Cable Car depot. It continues partly in open stream but mainly in pipes up to 100 years old maintained by Dunedin City Council through private residential property.

The Kaikorai Stream culvert is joined by tributaries from Halfway Bush, then empties into the much larger Fraser's Creek.

=== Fraser's Creek ===
Fraser's Creek provides the bulk of the Kaikorai Stream's flow, and superficially appears to be the "main" river, and is indeed labelled Kaikorai Stream on some official maps. Excess water (brought here by pipeline from Deep Creek in the Taieri River catchment) is discharged from a city water reservoir. This spilling has taken place since the mid 1970s, providing a source of cool, clear water of high quality that would otherwise not be available in the Kaikorai catchment. In dry weather, about two thirds of the flow of the Kaikorai Stream comes from this outflow. Fraser's Creek flows through Fraser's Gully, a popular recreation reserve clad in native bush.

=== Lower river ===
From the confluence the Kaikorai Stream flows southwest down the wide Kaikorai Valley through the suburbs of Bradford and Kenmure. At Bradford the stream flows through the Roslyn Woollen Mills, a former textile mill where according to legend the colour of blankets being made could be determined by the hue of the river water.

Pupils of the adjacent Kaikorai Valley College use the stream for outdoor education, studying water quality and flow, learning fly fishing and monitoring waste water.

Many industries in Kaikorai Valley discharge waste water into the stream. The industrial area here is one of the few stretches of river with esplanade reserves (providing public access) along its banks.

At Burnside the river turns west through Green Island, mainly in a channel lined with concrete alongside the Dunedin Southern Motorway.

Below Green Island, the stream is joined by major tributary Abbots Creek then resumes a southwest course, reaching the Pacific Ocean at Waldronville, where its outflow is a lagoon, the Kaikorai Estuary (also known as the Waldronville Lagoon or Kaikorai Lagoon). This lagoon is part of a research project aimed at establishing a national estuarine monitoring protocol. It is inhabited by black swans, and spoonbills are also sometimes observed.

Though only a short stream some 18 kilometres (11 mi) in length, it has been important to the industrial history of Dunedin. Many local industries have used power from the stream, most notably the Roslyn Mills.

== Flora and fauna ==
Native aquatic animals in the stream include whitebait, freshwater crayfish (koura), giant kokopu, longfinned and shortfinned eels and freshwater mussels.

In 1987, the Otago Regional Council launched a streamscape restoration programme which included restoration of riparian vegetation and public access to parts of the stream. In 1996 the Dunedin City Council redeveloped its sanitary landfill at Green Island to reduce leachate in the Kaikorai Stream, while in the same year the Dunedin Environment Centre began restoration work at four sites along the stream.

== Pollution ==
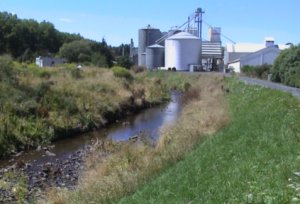
Industry along the Kaikorai Stream

In 1849 settler Samual Woolley described the stream as of the 'purest water." In 1907 The Otago Daily Times described the Kaikorai Stream as "a long continuous sewer" and "a sanitary scandal." A century later, the paper described the stream as a "little battler". while an Otago Regional Councillor described this and other Dunedin streams' water quality as "basically crap." The pollution was, to a large extent, the result of the heavy industrialisation of the lower course of the stream, particularly around Burnside, which was the site of a freezing works and cement factory. Other industries which used the stream's waters in the early days of Dunedin's settlement included tanneries, stockyards, a flour mill, Kempthorne Prosser's chemical plant, and the Otago Iron Rolling Mills.

The water quality worsens as the stream gets closer to the sea. Macroinvertebrates found in the estuary indicate the water is degraded, while more sensitive species exist near Kaikorai Valley College and the situation improves further upstream.

The estuary is bound by sanitary landfills on either side; in 2025, the Fairfield landfill on the north bank (operated by Waste Management NZ) was shown to be having a "toxic impact" on the Kaikorai lagoon.

Major pollution events include an accidental spill of lime from the Dunedin City Council water treatment plant at Mount Grand in 2000 which "killed all aquatic life" including 1,000 trout for which the council was fined NZD14,000, and a discharge of cooking oil from a KFC restaurant in 2011 for which Restaurant Brands was fined NZD15,000.

== Gallery ==
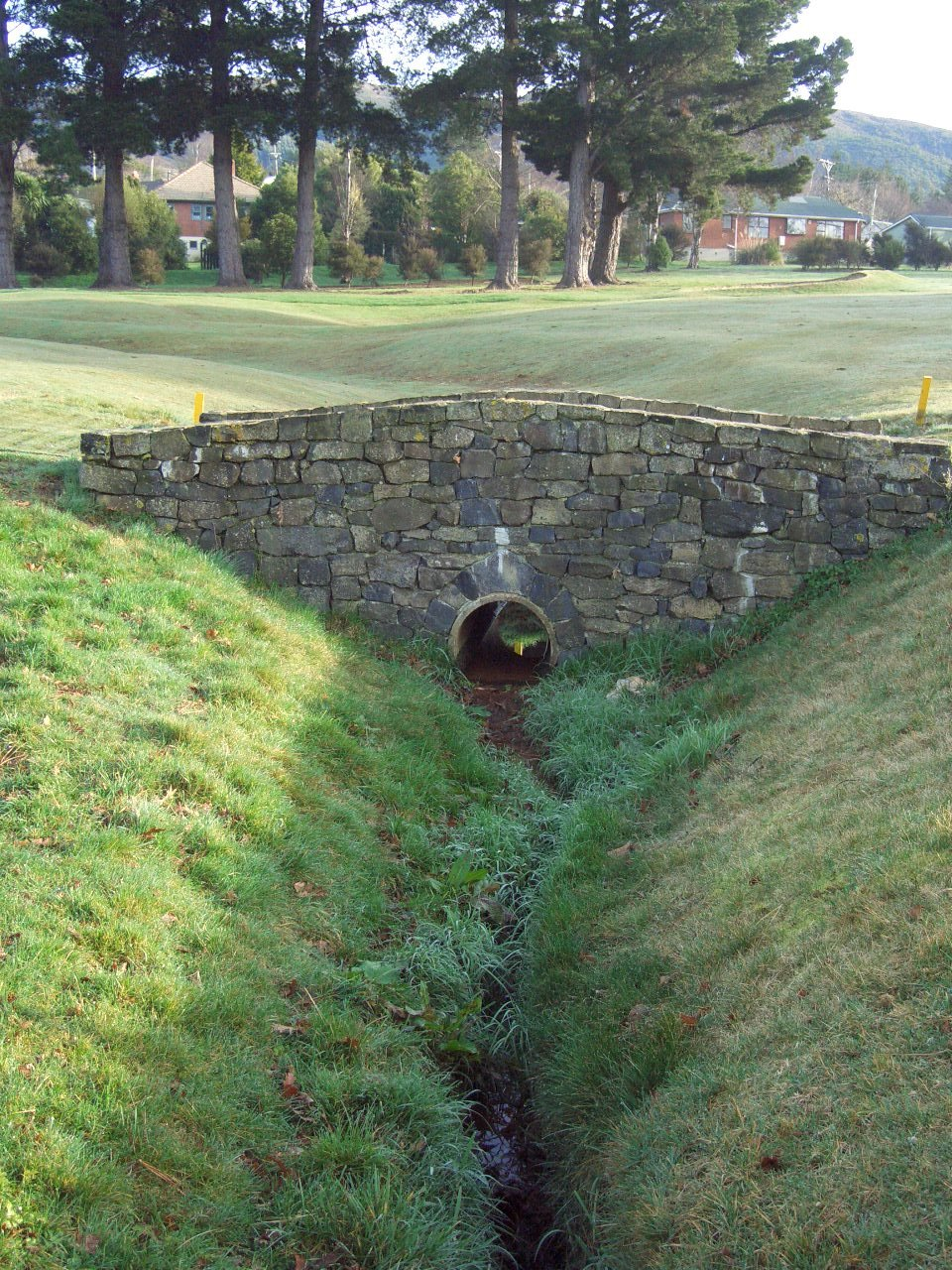
A footbridge on the No 2 fairway at Balmacewen Golf Course: the stream's source

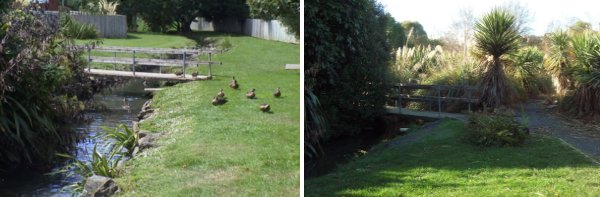
Before and after: planting of the stream banks through Kaikorai Common

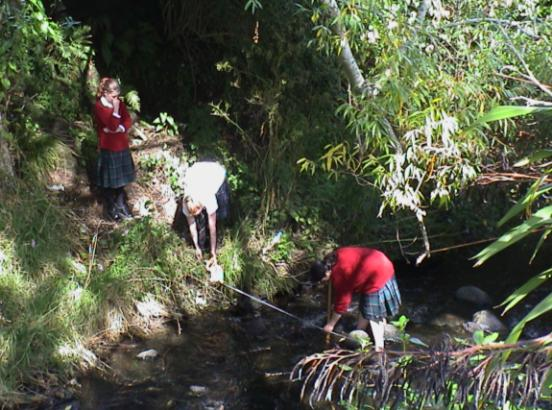
Kaikorai Valley College students study the stream flow.

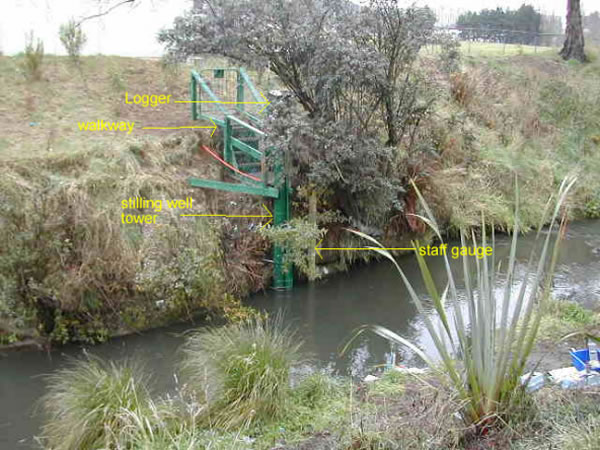
Measuring equipment used to study hydrology

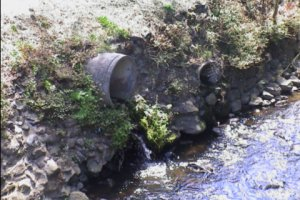
Discharge in Green Island

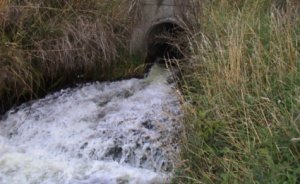
Mt Grand overflow.

== See also ==
- Water of Leith, Dunedin's other principal urban river
