= Wakari =

Suburb of Dunedin, New Zealand

- Suburb
- Interactive map of Wakari
- Coordinates: 45°51′32″S 170°29′00″E
- Country: New Zealand
- City: Dunedin
- Local authority: Dunedin City Council

Area
  - Land: 221 ha (550 acres)

Population (June 2025)
  - Total: 4,250
  - Density: 1,920/km^{2} (4,980/sq mi)

	Helensburgh	Glenleith
Halfway Bush	Wakari	Maori Hill
Brockville	Kaikorai	Roslyn

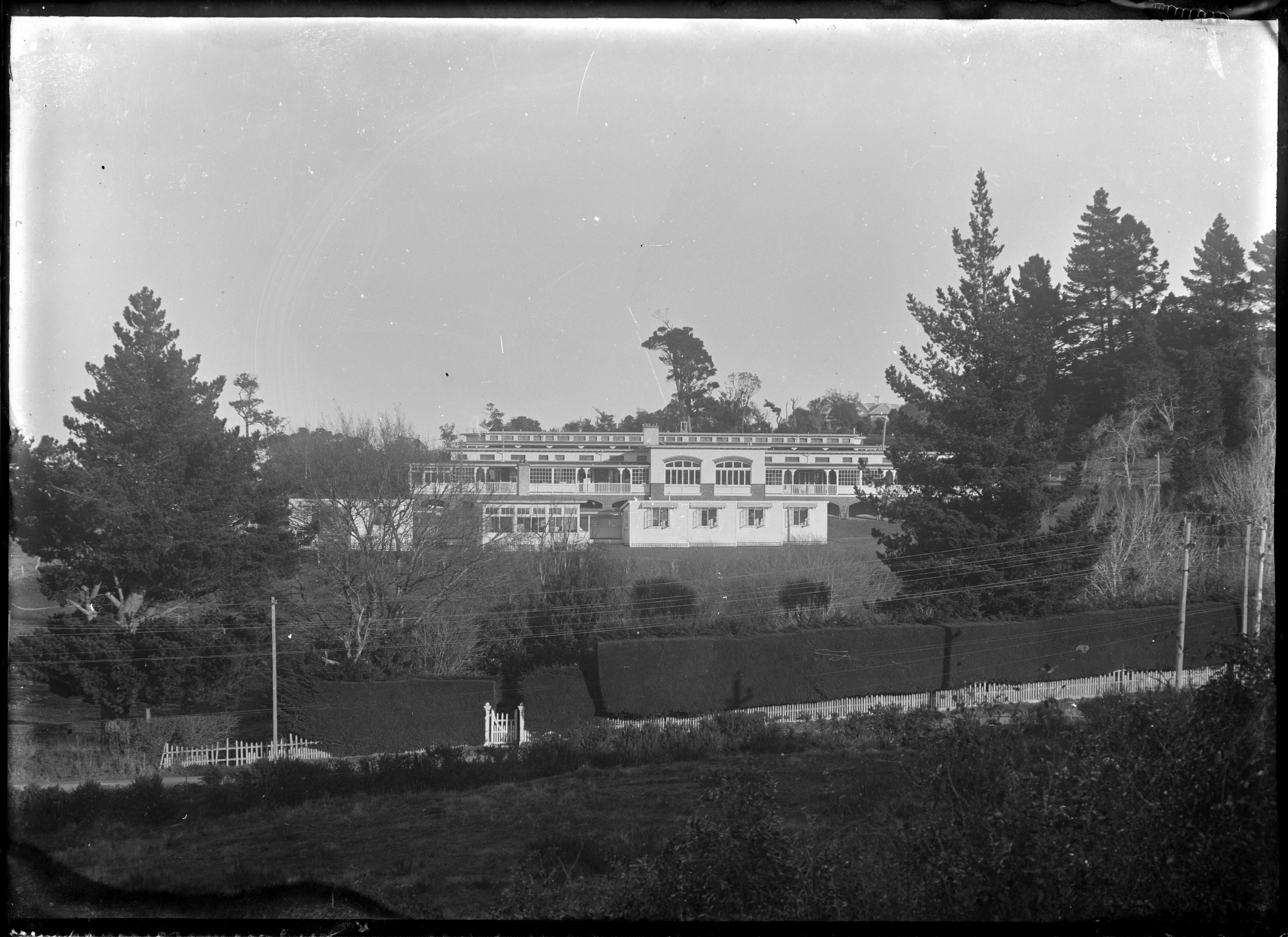
View of the sanatorium at Wakari, Dunedin. Photograph taken by Albert Percy Godber, in 1926.

Wakari (/ˌwɑːˈkɑːriː/ wah-kah-ree) is a residential suburb of the New Zealand city of Dunedin. It is located 2.5 kilometres (1.6 mi) to the northwest of the city centre, immediately to the west of the ridge which runs to the west of the city's centre. Wakari lies to the north of the upper reaches of the Kaikorai Valley, and is also north of the suburb of Kaikorai. The suburbs of Roslyn and Maori Hill are situated on the ridge immediately to the southeast and east of Wakari. The suburb of Halfway Bush lies to the northwest, and the smaller suburb of Helensburgh lies to the north.

Wakari is an anglicisation of the Māori Whakaari, "exposed to view". This is the Māori name for the hill, Flagstaff, which lies 2.5 kilometres (1.6 mi) to the northwest. A shibboleth is that many (though not all) local residents pronounce the name as "wy-kar-ree" (/waɪˌkæriː/).

The suburb is bounded in the south by Taieri Road, a main suburban arterial route which links central Dunedin with the Taieri Plains. West of Halfway Bush, the road becomes Three Mile Hill Road, crossing the eponymous hill to reach the Taieri Plain northeast of Mosgiel. To the southeast of Wakari, Taieri Road runs under the Roslyn Overbridge and becomes Stuart Street, one of central Dunedin's main streets. Other main roads in and around Wakari include Balmacewen Road in the northern part of the suburb, Helensburgh Road in the northeast, Nairn Street, and Shetland Street.

Wakari's most prominent structure is the Wakari Hospital, one of Dunedin's main health care centres, which specialises in psychiatric services. This hospital is located in the west of the suburb, close to its boundary with Halfway Bush.

Āraiteuru Marae is also located in Wakari. It is a marae (meeting ground) of Ngāi Tahu and includes Āraiteuru wharenui (meeting house). It is next to Balmacewen Intermediate School.

== Demographics ==
Wakari covers 2.21 km^{2} (0.85 sq mi) and had an estimated population of 4,250 as of June 2025, with a population density of 1,923 people per km^{2}.

Historical population
Year	Pop.	±% p.a.
2006	3,693	—
2013	3,822	+0.49%
2018	4,098	+1.40%

Wakari had a population of 4,098 at the 2018 New Zealand census, an increase of 276 people (7.2%) since the 2013 census, and an increase of 405 people (11.0%) since the 2006 census. There were 1,725 households, comprising 1,929 males and 2,169 females, giving a sex ratio of 0.89 males per female. The median age was 37.3 years (compared with 37.4 years nationally), with 780 people (19.0%) aged under 15 years, 828 (20.2%) aged 15 to 29, 1,896 (46.3%) aged 30 to 64, and 600 (14.6%) aged 65 or older.

Ethnicities were 85.3% European/Pākehā, 9.6% Māori, 2.9% Pasifika, 8.8% Asian, and 3.5% other ethnicities. People may identify with more than one ethnicity.

The percentage of people born overseas was 19.4, compared with 27.1% nationally.

Although some people chose not to answer the census's question about religious affiliation, 56.3% had no religion, 32.2% were Christian, 0.3% had Māori religious beliefs, 1.0% were Hindu, 1.2% were Muslim, 0.4% were Buddhist and 2.3% had other religions.

Of those at least 15 years old, 996 (30.0%) people had a bachelor's or higher degree, and 492 (14.8%) people had no formal qualifications. The median income was $31,000, compared with $31,800 nationally. 453 people (13.7%) earned over $70,000 compared to 17.2% nationally. The employment status of those at least 15 was that 1,626 (49.0%) people were employed full-time, 528 (15.9%) were part-time, and 114 (3.4%) were unemployed.

== Education ==
Wakari School is a state contributing primary school for Year 1 to 6 students, with a roll of 279 students. The school started in 1858.

St Mary's School is a state-integrated Catholic school for Year 1 to 6 students. It has a roll of 58 students. It started in St Mary's Church in 1913.

Balmacewen Intermediate is a state intermediate school for Year 7 to 8 students, with a roll of 472 students. It first opened in 1964.

All these schools are co-educational. Rolls are as of March 2026.

From 1878 to 1883, a secondary boarding and day school for boys, St Aloysius College, was operated by the Jesuits at Wakari. That school's site is now occupied by a golf course (Balmacewen Course), the 10th hole of which is still called "the monastery".
