= Halfway Bush =

Suburb of Dunedin, New Zealand

- Suburb
- Interactive map of Halfway Bush
- Coordinates: 45.854°S 170.466°E
- Country: New Zealand
- City: Dunedin
- Local authority: Dunedin City Council

Area
  - Land: 146 ha (360 acres)

Population (June 2025)
  - Total: 1,920
  - Density: 1,320/km^{2} (3,410/sq mi)
- Hospitals: Wakari Hospital

Whare Flat		Helensburgh
Wingatui	Halfway Bush	Wakari
Brockville		Kaikorai

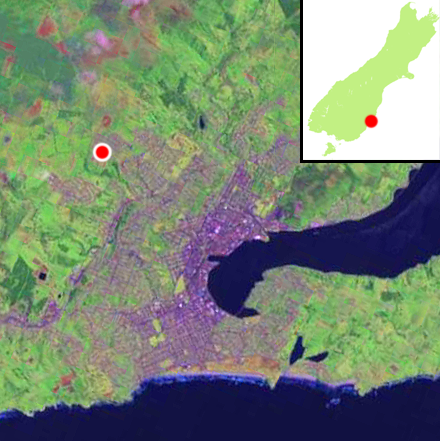
Location of Halfway Bush within Dunedin's main urban area

Halfway Bush is a suburb of the New Zealand city of Dunedin. It is located 3 kilometres (1.9 mi) to the northwest of the city centre, close to the point at which Taieri Road becomes the winding rural Three Mile Hill Road. It was this road which gave the suburb its name, as this locality was halfway between the Taieri Plains and central Dunedin in the early days of European settlement, when Three Mile Hill was the main route from Dunedin to the Otago hinterland. This route was superseded by the route through the Caversham Valley in the 1860s.

Halfway Bush is the most inland of the suburbs which comprise Dunedin's main urban area, and is at an altitude of 280 metres (920 ft). For these reasons, it often receives harsher winter weather than much of the rest of the city. Whereas central Dunedin may only receive passing snow showers on average one or two days per year, snow will often settle on the streets of Halfway Bush for several days per year.

The suburb is connected to central Dunedin by Taieri Road, which runs through the suburb to the suburb of Wakari to the southeast. From Wakari, the road rises to pass under the Roslyn Overbridge before descending into the centre of the city as Stuart Street. The smaller suburb of Helensburgh lies to the east of Halfway Bush, but the suburb is surrounded by rural land to the north and west. To the southwest lies Fraser's Gully, a scenic reserve, which separates Halfway Bush from the suburb of Brockville. A popular alternative route to central Dunedin is via Maori Hill and Drivers Road to George Street.

Halfway Bush mainly consists of Taieri Road and a series of crescents which branch from it. Chief among these are Ashmore Street and Gilkison Street, the latter of which connects with Wakari Road, a long, straight semi-rural road which links Taieri Road with Glenleith, 2.2 kilometres (1.4 mi) to the northwest, by way of Helensburgh and the forest plantations surrounding Ross Creek Reservoir.

Prominent buildings in the Halfway Bush area include Halfway Bush School, the local primary school, and two health facilities; Wakari Hospital, which is located at the eastern end of the suburb, and Ashburn Hall, a private psychiatric clinic, at the point where Taieri Road becomes Three Mile Hill Road, close to the suburb's western end.

== Demographics ==
Halfway Bush covers 1.46 km^{2} (0.56 sq mi) and had an estimated population of 1,920 as of June 2025, with a population density of 1,315 people per km^{2}.

Historical population
Year	Pop.	±% p.a.
2006	1,824	—
2013	1,743	−0.65%
2018	1,830	+0.98%

Before the 2023 census, Halfway Bush had a larger boundary, covering 1.70 km^{2} (0.66 sq mi). Using that boundary, Halfway Bush had a population of 1,830 at the 2018 New Zealand census, an increase of 87 people (5.0%) since the 2013 census, and an increase of 6 people (0.3%) since the 2006 census. There were 669 households, comprising 888 males and 942 females, giving a sex ratio of 0.94 males per female. The median age was 36.4 years (compared with 37.4 years nationally), with 348 people (19.0%) aged under 15 years, 369 (20.2%) aged 15 to 29, 834 (45.6%) aged 30 to 64, and 279 (15.2%) aged 65 or older.

Ethnicities were 89.0% European/Pākehā, 8.7% Māori, 4.9% Pasifika, 4.9% Asian, and 3.3% other ethnicities. People may identify with more than one ethnicity.

The percentage of people born overseas was 13.4, compared with 27.1% nationally.

Although some people chose not to answer the census's question about religious affiliation, 59.8% had no religion, 29.0% were Christian, 0.3% had Māori religious beliefs, 0.5% were Hindu, 1.3% were Muslim, 0.5% were Buddhist and 2.1% had other religions.

Of those at least 15 years old, 276 (18.6%) people had a bachelor's or higher degree, and 324 (21.9%) people had no formal qualifications. The median income was $29,600, compared with $31,800 nationally. 141 people (9.5%) earned over $70,000 compared to 17.2% nationally. The employment status of those at least 15 was that 762 (51.4%) people were employed full-time, 207 (14.0%) were part-time, and 51 (3.4%) were unemployed.

== Education ==
Halfway Bush School is a co-educational state contributing primary school for Year 1 to 6 students, with a roll of 33 students as of March 2026. The school was established in 1955.
