= Ellis Park, Dunedin =

Sports ground in Dunedin, New Zealand

Coordinates: 45°52′00″S 170°28′36″E

Ellis Park
- Interactive map of Ellis Park
- Location: Kaikorai, Dunedin, New Zealand
- Owner: Dunedin City Council
- Type: Public park
- Surface: Grass

Tenants
- Roslyn-Wakari AFC; Ellis Park Softball Club

Ellis Park is a sports ground in the city of Dunedin, New Zealand. The park is the home of Roslyn-Wakari association football club and Ellis Park Softball Club.

Ellis Park is located in the suburb of Kaikorai, near the top of the valley of the Kaikorai Stream. A tributary of the stream, Frasers Stream, runs along the northwestern perimeter of the park. Although located within a suburban area, the park is immediately to the south and east of an area of undeveloped wooded land, Frasers Gully, which is a popular walk with local ramblers and is protected as a reserve.

== History ==
The park was purchased by the Dunedin City Council in 1926, and was originally the site of a rubbish tip. The area was reclaimed for recreational use, and clubrooms — later used by Roslyn-Wakari AFC — were developed on the site of old stables in the late 1940s. Replacement clubrooms were built in 1971.

== Facilities and use ==
Ellis Park currently contains three full-sized association football pitches and two junior pitches, one of which also functions as a softball diamond.

The park has no permanent spectator seating and is primarily used for local club competitions and community sport. It is managed and maintained by the Dunedin City Council as part of the city's network of public sports grounds.
