= Kaikorai Presbyterian Church =

Coordinates: 45.86514°S 170.48452°E

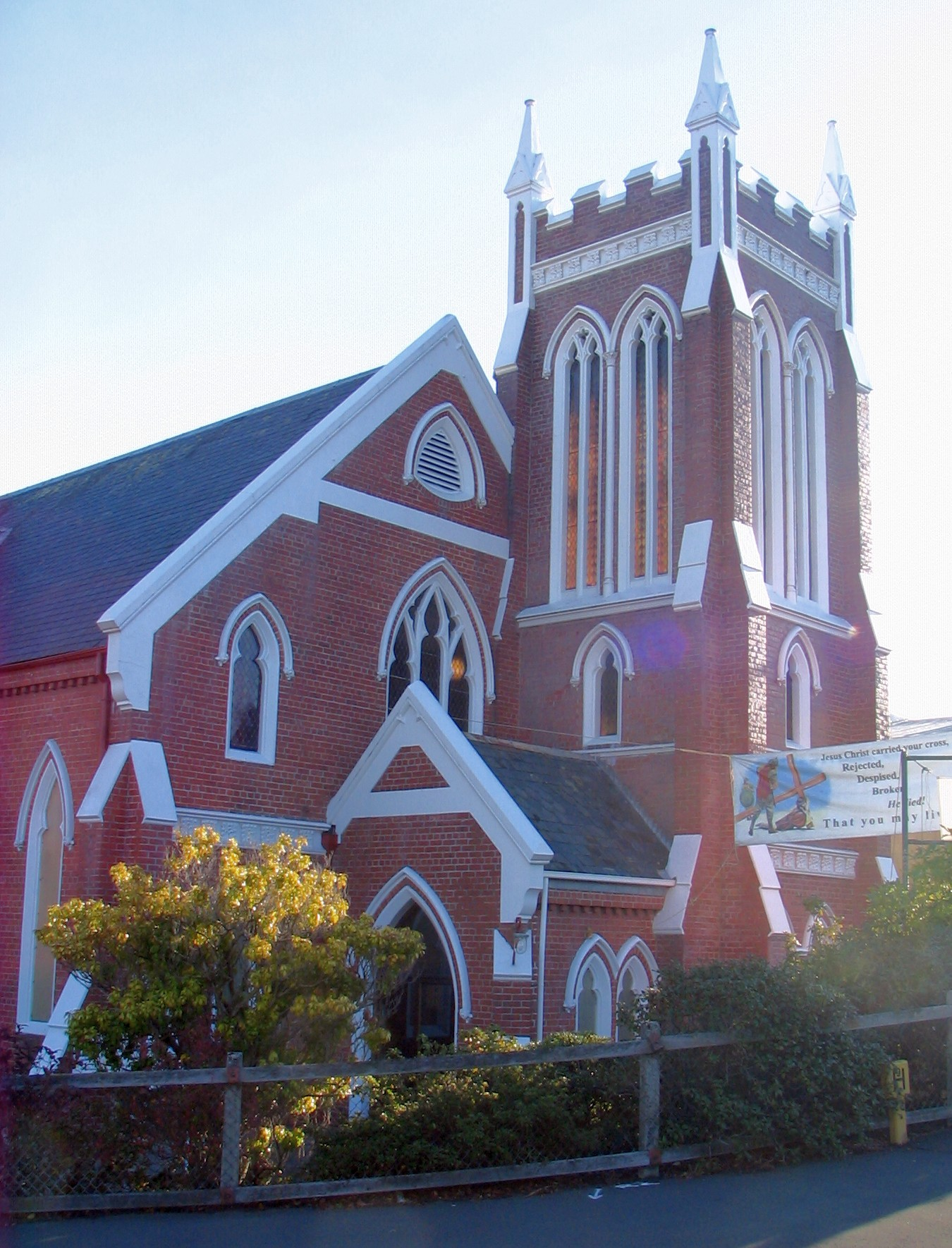
- Kaikorai Presbyterian Church in 2008
- Kaikorai Presbyterian Church
- Location: 127 Taieri Road (cnr Nairn Street); Dunedin
- Country: New Zealand
- Denomination: Presbyterian
- Website: www.kaikoraichurch.co.nz

History
- Founded: 1868

Kaikorai Presbyterian Church is a Presbyterian congregation of the PCANZ Presbyterian Church of Aotearoa New Zealand located in Kaikorai, a suburb of Dunedin, New Zealand.

Kaikorai Presbyterian Church has stood at the crossroads of Taieri Road and Nairn Street since 1868. As early as 1852 pioneer families trudged along bush tracks and muddy roads, (for those days the bush extended from Flagstaff to the shore) for weekly prayer meetings, first in Hood Hall (now Ferntree House), and then at Wakari School. As a mission outpost of Knox Church, a minister preached weekly at the school.

The need for a church grew and in time the Wakari School Committee requested that a church building be erected in the district. With self-sacrifice and faith, £477 was raised, and a modest wooden building with a shingle roof was erected on land gifted by Miss Helen Hood. Originally this was known as 'Wakari Church' however given the location the present name of Kaikorai was more appropriate. The first service was held in 1866, with the church operating as a daughter of Knox Church.

Such was the faith and growth of the congregation that in 1868 they were established as an independent congregation and authorised to call a minister, the first of many who served not only the church but also the community. That first church building became too small, and again the congregation met the challenge, and with extensions, a second church came into being in 1880.

As the congregation grew so did the district, with the advent of the Roslyn Mills and the Rosyln and Kaikorai cablecars. In 1906, again in faith, a tender of £2750 was accepted for the erection of a new church. The Mayor of Roslyn laid the foundation stone (beneath which is a time capsule!), and in 1907 the third church held its first service. It stands, today, on the site of the old wooden church which was moved to the rear of the grounds to serve as a hall. In the brick church four stained glass windows were installed to honour founding members. The original wooden church was demolished to make way for the present hall, which is in constant use by both church and community.

By 1918 there were twelve places of worship in the area prompting thoughts of union. But it was not until the centenary of the church that it became part of the West Dunedin Union, serving the districts of Wakari, Halfway Bush, Brockville and Kaikorai – the very areas from which those early settlers traveled to worship, and Waitati. It had union too with the Roslyn Methodist Church and the local Congregational and Church of Christ churches. Today the pendulum has swung and it is again known as Kaikorai Presbyterian Church.

The years have seen the rule of six sovereigns, the emergence of the depression (during which the congregation gave unobtrusive unemployment assistance), and two world wars. The church has moved with changing times, with heated and earnest discussion as to whether organ music should be permitted, and decades later whether dancing should be permitted at Bible Class socials.
