= Kaikorai Common Reserve =

Urban reserve and wetland in Kaikorai Valley, Dunedin, New Zealand

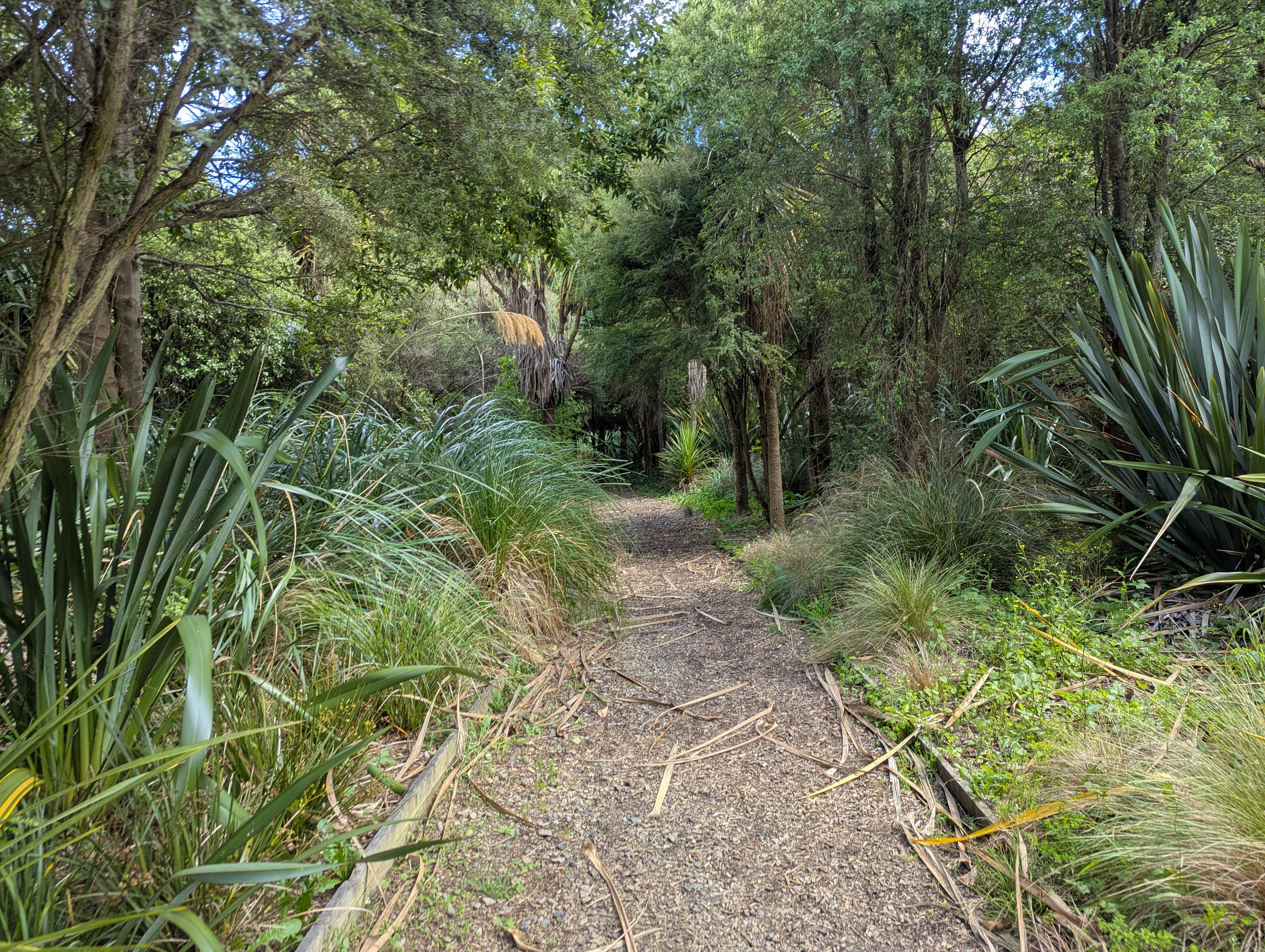
- Interactive map of Kaikorai Common Reserve
- Location: Kaikorai Valley, Dunedin, New Zealand
- Nearest city: Dunedin
- Coordinates: 45°51′47″S 170°29′17″E
- Designation: Recreation Reserve
- Governing body: Dunedin City Council

Kaikorai Common Reserve (also known as Kaikorai Commons) is an urban recreation reserve on Shetland Street in the Kaikorai Valley, Dunedin, New Zealand. The reserve is approximately 600 metres long, sitting along a tributary of the Kaikorai Stream and contains a restored wetland and regenerating native bush.

== History and restoration ==
Before restoration, the site was an undeveloped wet field with the stream being modified into an open drain. Native plantings began as early as 1995. From 1996, Dunedin Environment Centre Trust (DECT) began a formal replanting programme in partnership with the Dunedin City Council Parks and Reserves Department, establishing thousands of native plants across the reserve.

In June 2007, the wetland was formally opened, with over 100 residents attending the planting day alongside the Mayor Peter Chin, and MPs Pete Hodgson, David Benson-Pope, and Metiria Turei. In 2011, students from Balmacewen Intermediate and Kaikorai Primary School created a ceramic-tile-covered seat and an Oamaru stone and macrocarpa pouwhenua for the reserve as part of an educational project.

In 2014, the reserve faced the potential loss of vegetation due to planned Dunedin City Council works to repair sewage pipes, which could have required clearing a strip up to 12 metres wide.

== Ecology ==
The reserve has been transformed into a functioning urban native forest and wetland. Podocarp species including kahikatea have reached 7 metres (23 ft) in height, and kōwhai attract tūī. Fruit trees have also been planted.

== Gallery ==
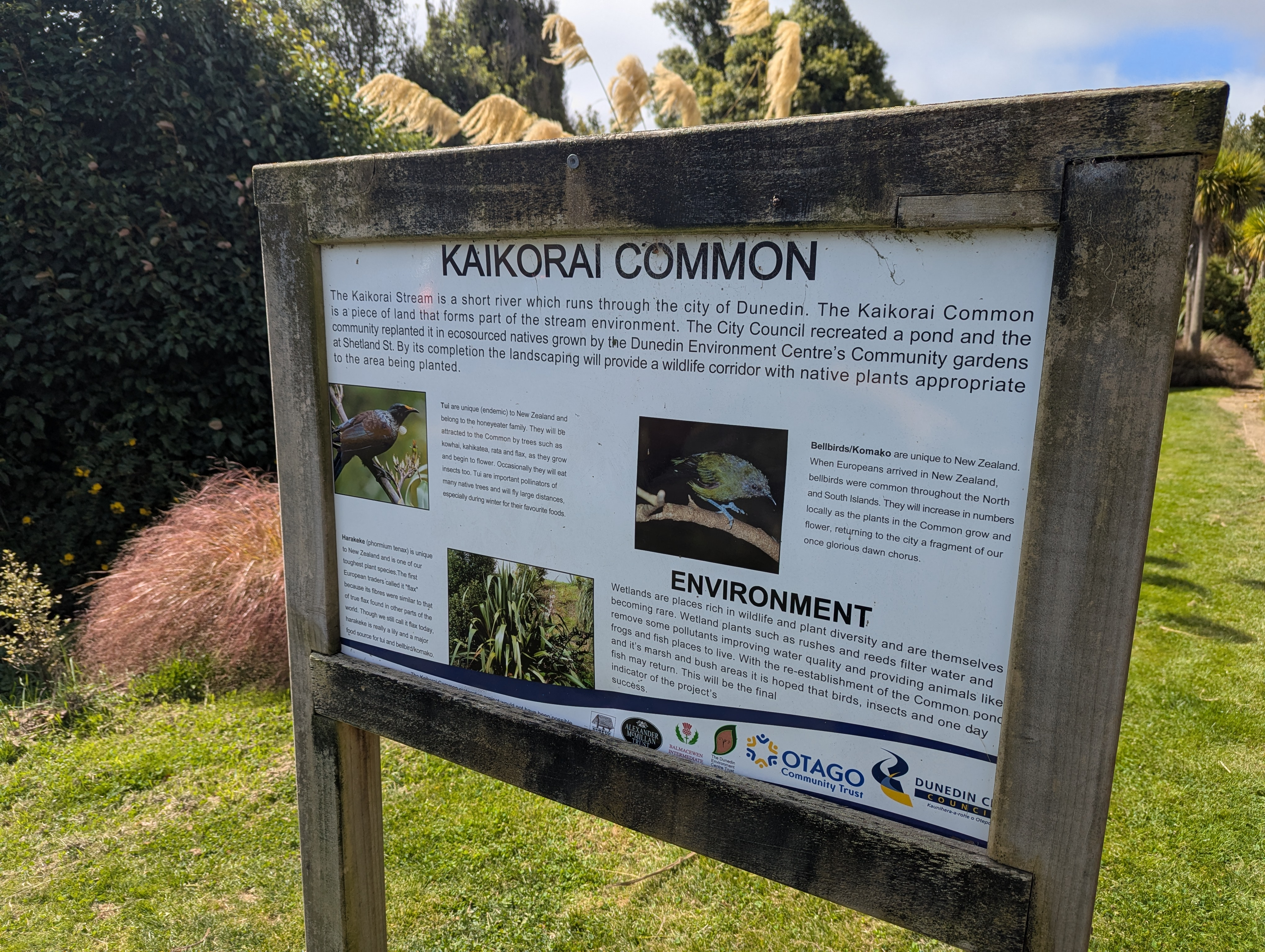
Kaikorai Common Sign Front

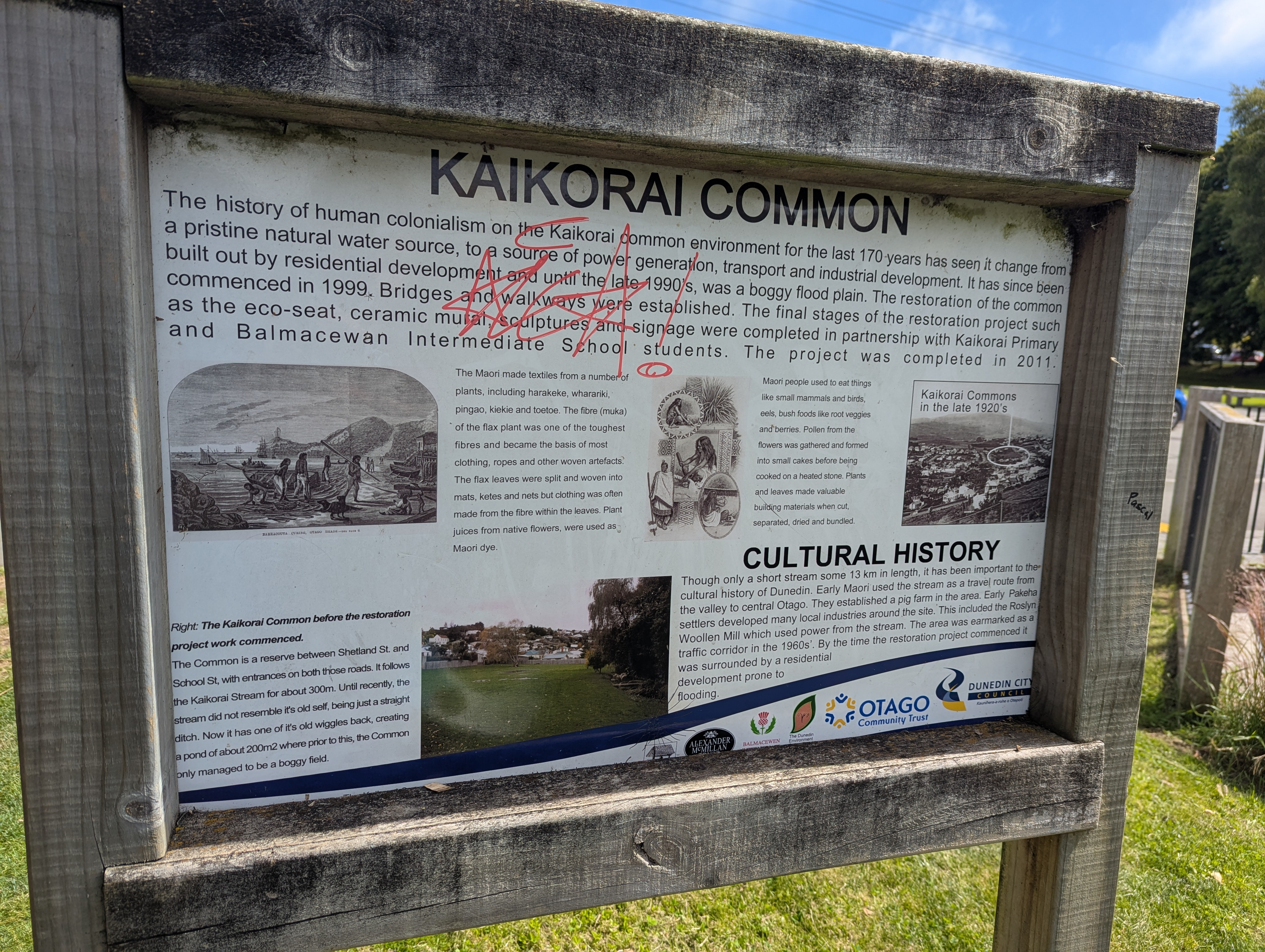
Kaikorai Common Sign Back

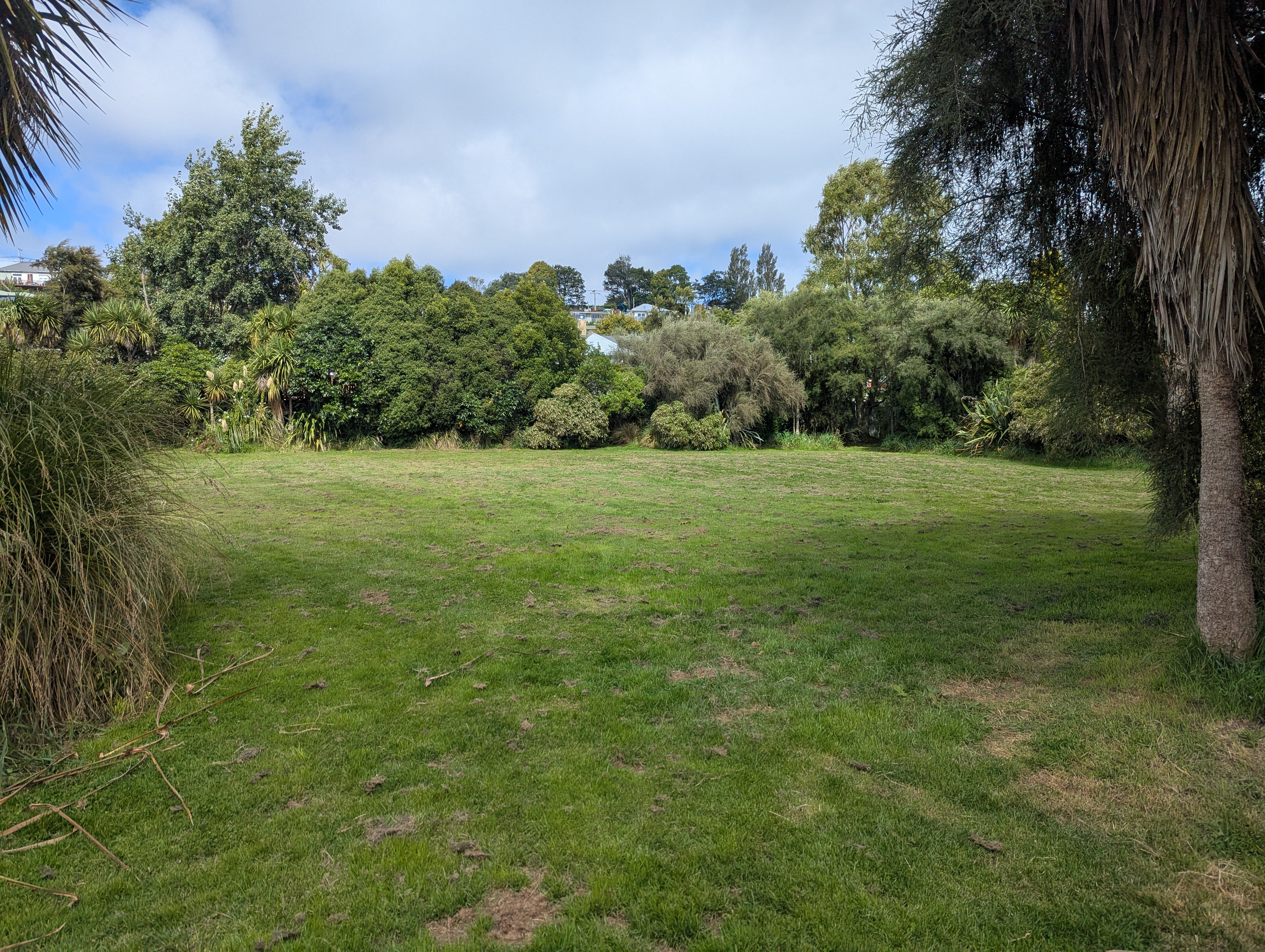
Kaikorai Common Field

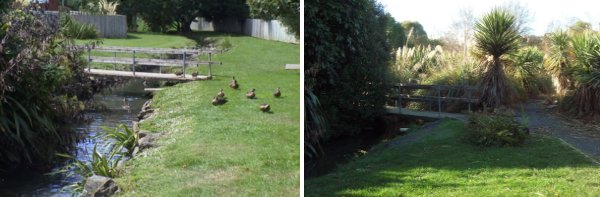
Before and after: planting of the stream banks through Kaikorai Common
