= Frasers Gully =

Urban gully and reserve in Dunedin, New Zealand

Coordinates: 45°51′40″S 170°27′40″E

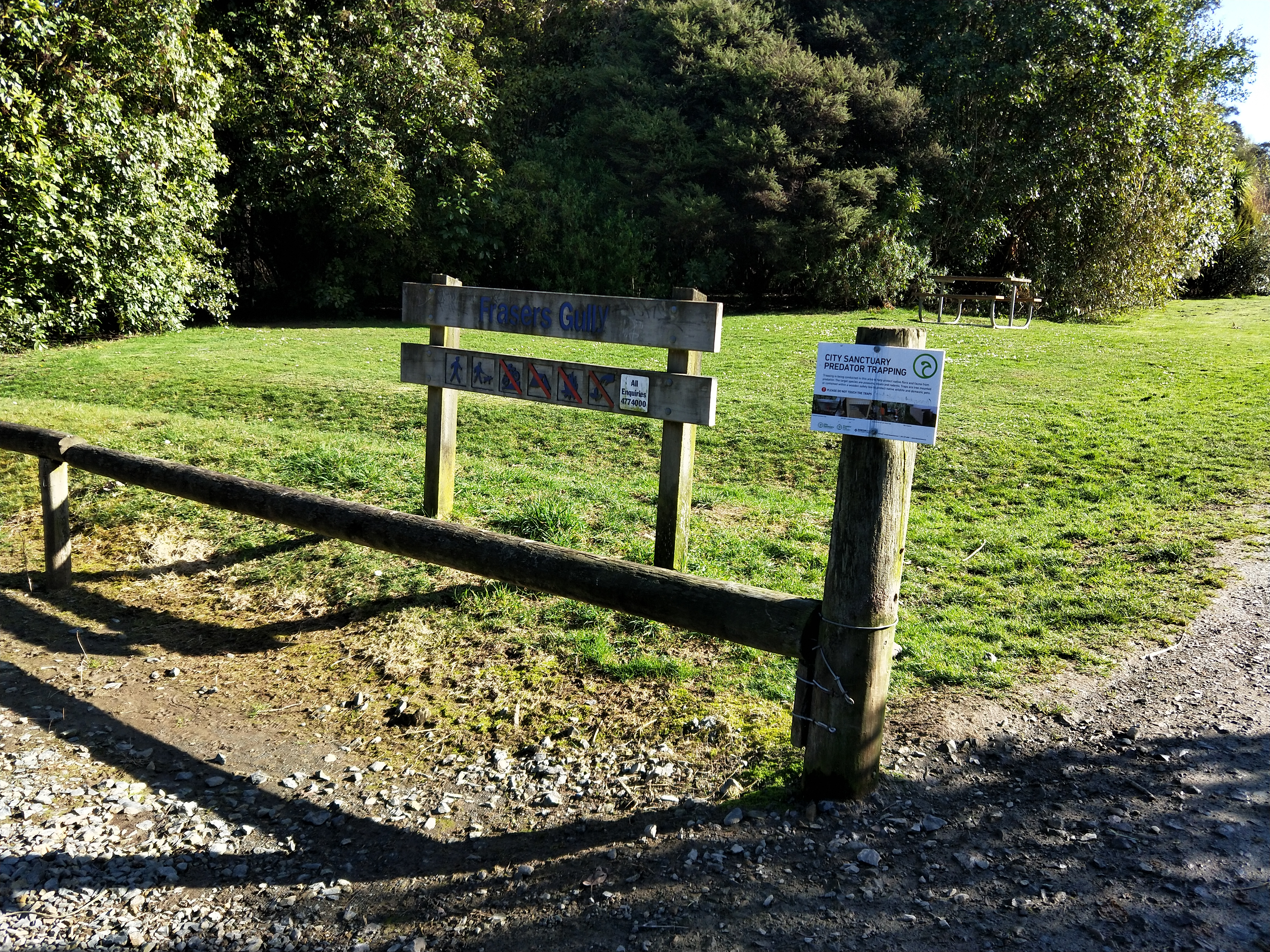
- Frasers Gully Recreation Reserve, Kaikorai Valley
- Location: Kaikorai Valley, Dunedin, New Zealand
- Nearest city: Dunedin
- Designation: Recreation Reserve
- Governing body: Dunedin City Council

Frasers Gully (also spelled Fraser's Gully) is an urban gully and public reserve in the Kaikorai Valley area of Dunedin, in the South Island of New Zealand.The gully is traversed by Frasers Creek (also known as Frasers Stream), a tributary of the Kaikorai Stream, and contains native and regenerating bushland within an otherwise urban setting. It is managed by the Dunedin City Council as part of the city's network of urban green spaces.

== Geography ==
Frasers Gully lies immediately to the northeast of the suburb of Brockville and southwest of Halfway Bush, some 4.5 kilometres (2.8 mi) northwest of Dunedin's city centre. It extends from the upper reaches of the Kaikorai Valley towards Frasers Road. The gully forms part of the upper Kaikorai Stream catchment and acts as a green corridor connecting multiple suburban reserves in Dunedin's western suburbs. At its southern end, it widens close to a sports ground, Ellis Park, with the stream forming the park's northeastern boundary.

=== Frasers Creek and Kaikorai Stream ===
Frasers Creek is a significant right-bank tributary of the Kaikorai Stream. Hydrological studies of the catchment note that Frasers Creek provides a substantial portion of the stream's flow. The watercourse flows through the gully, which is clad in native bush, providing riparian habitat within the urban environment.

== Ecology and conservation ==
Frasers Gully is listed as an Urban Landscape Conservation Area. The vegetation includes a mix of original native forest remnants, notably broadleaf and fuchsia, along with regenerating bush. The reserve serves as an important habitat for native birdlife, including the tūī, bellbird, and fantail.

== Recreation ==
The reserve is a popular destination for walking. The main Frasers Gully Track follows the creek and links Frasers Road in Kaikorai Valley with Dalziel Road at the eastern edge of Brockville. The track is approximately 2.3 kilometres long and is renowned for its woodland environment and accessible nature trails, which are within easy reach of central Dunedin.
