= Balmacewen Intermediate School =

Location
- 44 Chapman Street, Dunedin, New Zealand; 45.859693°S 170.489918°E

Information
- Type: State (Public) co-educational intermediate (Year 7-8)
- Motto: Learning is Forever
- Established: 1964
- Ministry of Education Institution no.: 3711
- Principal: Corey Todd
- Enrolment: 473 (July 2026)
- Houses: Whakaari; Araiteuru; Kaikorai; Whanupaki
- Socio-economic decile: 9
- School Song: Balmacewen Friends
- Website: www.balmacewen.school.nz

Balmacewen Intermediate School is a state co-educational intermediate school located in Wakari, Dunedin, New Zealand. It has 21 regular classrooms and 4 technology classes, involving Hard Materials, Food Technology, Textiles, and Art.

== Notable alumni ==
- Kushana Bush – artist
- Clare Curran – Member of Parliament
- Matt Heath – New Zealand actor
