= Helensburgh, New Zealand =

Suburb of Dunedin, New Zealand

Helensburgh
- Suburb
- Interactive map of Helensburgh
- Coordinates: 45.851°S 170.480°E
- Country: New Zealand
- City: Dunedin
- Local authority: Dunedin City Council

Area
  - Land: 146 ha (360 acres)

Population (June 2025)
  - Total: 1,220
  - Density: 836/km^{2} (2,160/sq mi)

	(Flagstaff)	Glenleith
	Helensburgh
Halfway Bush	Wakari	Maori Hill

Helensburgh is a suburb of the New Zealand city of Dunedin. It is located to the northwest of the city centre.

Helensburgh is located immediately to the north of Wakari and east of Halfway Bush. It is located on a series of small crescents which branch off the northern side of Helensburgh Road and off Wakari Road, which runs roughly parallel with Helensburgh Road some 300 metres (980 ft) to the northwest (confusingly, this means that Helensburgh Road is largely in Wakari, and Wakari Road is largely in Helensburgh). Wakari Road, a long, straight semi-rural road, links Taieri Road with Glenleith, 1.7 kilometres (1.1 mi) to the northeast, by way of the forest plantations surrounding Ross Creek Reservoir. Helensburgh is bounded in the northeast by the Balmacewen Golf Course.

== Demographics ==
Helensburgh covers 1.46 km^{2} (0.56 sq mi) and had an estimated population of 1,220 as of June 2025, with a population density of 836 people per km^{2}.

Historical population
Year	Pop.	±% p.a.
2006	1,071	—
2013	1,173	+1.31%
2018	1,188	+0.25%

Helensburgh had a population of 1,188 at the 2018 New Zealand census, an increase of 15 people (1.3%) since the 2013 census, and an increase of 117 people (10.9%) since the 2006 census. There were 456 households, comprising 570 males and 615 females, giving a sex ratio of 0.93 males per female. The median age was 40.0 years (compared with 37.4 years nationally), with 234 people (19.7%) aged under 15 years, 216 (18.2%) aged 15 to 29, 552 (46.5%) aged 30 to 64, and 183 (15.4%) aged 65 or older.

Ethnicities were 89.9% European/Pākehā, 7.1% Māori, 1.8% Pasifika, 7.6% Asian, and 2.3% other ethnicities. People may identify with more than one ethnicity.

The percentage of people born overseas was 17.9, compared with 27.1% nationally.

Although some people chose not to answer the census's question about religious affiliation, 56.1% had no religion, 34.6% were Christian, 1.0% were Hindu, 0.3% were Muslim, 0.5% were Buddhist and 2.0% had other religions.

Of those at least 15 years old, 285 (29.9%) people had a bachelor's or higher degree, and 111 (11.6%) people had no formal qualifications. The median income was $39,800, compared with $31,800 nationally. 183 people (19.2%) earned over $70,000 compared to 17.2% nationally. The employment status of those at least 15 was that 525 (55.0%) people were employed full-time, 144 (15.1%) were part-time, and 21 (2.2%) were unemployed.
