= Roslyn Woollen Mill =

Historic woollen mill and industrial complex in Kaikorai Valley, Dunedin, New Zealand

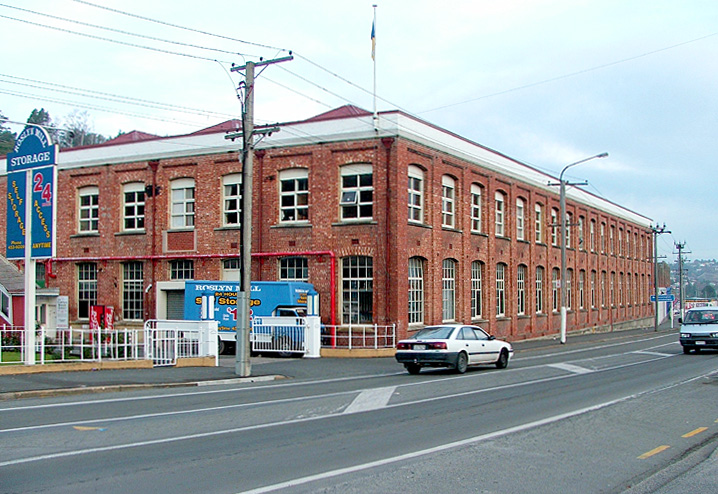
- The former Roslyn Woollen Mill buildings in Bradford, Dunedin
- Interactive map of Roslyn Woollen Mill

General information
- Location: 229 Kaikorai Valley Road, Dunedin, New Zealand
- Coordinates: 45.8730°S 170.4725°E
- Current tenants: Roslyn Mill Industrial Estate
- Completed: 1879
- Client: Ross & Glendining
- Owner: Ross & Glendining (1879–1969); Mosgiel Woollens Ltd (1969–1980)

Roslyn Woollen Mill (also known as Roslyn Worsted and Woollen Mills) is a historic textile manufacturing complex in the Kaikorai Valley, Dunedin, New Zealand. Established in 1879 by Ross & Glendining, it became one of the largest industrial operations in the country during the late 19th and early 20th centuries. Although textile production ceased in 1980, the majority of the original red-brick buildings remain and have been repurposed for modern commercial use.

== History ==
=== Foundation and growth (1879–1900) ===
The mill was founded by Scottish immigrants John Ross and Robert Glendining as part of their wholesale firm, Ross & Glendining. To ensure a steady supply of woollen goods, they opened the mill in 1879. The surrounding suburb was later named Bradford, in homage to the major textile city in West Yorkshire, England.

By 1900, the mill was a pioneer in Southern Hemisphere textile manufacturing:

- Worsted production: It became the first mill in the Southern Hemisphere to produce worsted cloth.
- Vertical integration: Wool was sourced from company-owned sheep stations (including Matakanui), and finished products were distributed nationally.
- Workforce: At its peak, over 500 employees worked at the mill, forming a significant social and economic anchor in Kaikorai Valley.

=== Decline and closure ===
The decline of New Zealand’s textile industry in the mid-20th century, due to synthetic fibres and international competition, led to the mill’s sale to Mosgiel Woollens Ltd in 1969. Following the company’s receivership, the Roslyn Woollen Mill closed permanently in 1980.

== Architecture and current use ==
The complex is a notable example of Victorian industrial architecture, featuring:

- Red-brick masonry: Characteristic of many 19th-century Dunedin industrial sites.
- Sawtooth roofing: Designed to provide consistent natural light onto the factory floor for weaving and textile production.

The Roslyn Woollen Mill was preserved and converted into the Roslyn Mill Industrial Estate, now housing small businesses, trade-related retail, and light manufacturing. Restoration efforts have modernised interiors while maintaining the historic facade.

== Environmental impact ==
Industrial activity along the Kaikorai Stream, including wool‑washing and woollen milling, contributed to significant degradation of water quality in the 19th and early 20th centuries. Early reports described the stream as "of the purest water," but by 1907 the Otago Daily Times characterised it as “a long continuous sewer,” reflecting the impact of industrial and urban discharges along its lower reaches. A 1908 parliamentary report noted that wastewater from wool‑washing operations and other factories entered the stream and, despite attempts at settling and filtration, often returned used water containing dye and other contaminants to the watercourse. Modern monitoring indicates that the Kaikorai Stream remains compromised by urban and historical industrial influences, and community groups such as Aroha Kaikorai Valley are actively working to improve habitat and water quality.

== Social legacy ==
The mill’s impact on the local community continues to be recognised:

- Mill girls: Women who worked at the looms contributed to Dunedin’s social history, with former workers maintaining social networks decades after the mill closed.
- Worker housing: The mill provided accommodation for some employees, reflecting the area’s industrial development.

== In popular culture ==
The Dunedin folk group The Pioneer Pog 'n' Scroggin Bush Band recorded a song titled "Roslyn Mill", composed by Si Khan and released on the 1993 album Love of the Land. The track has been broadcast on Radio New Zealand’s Sounds Historical programme, reflecting the mill’s place in regional cultural memory. A recording of the track is available on YouTube.
