= Kushana Bush =

New Zealand artist (born 1983)

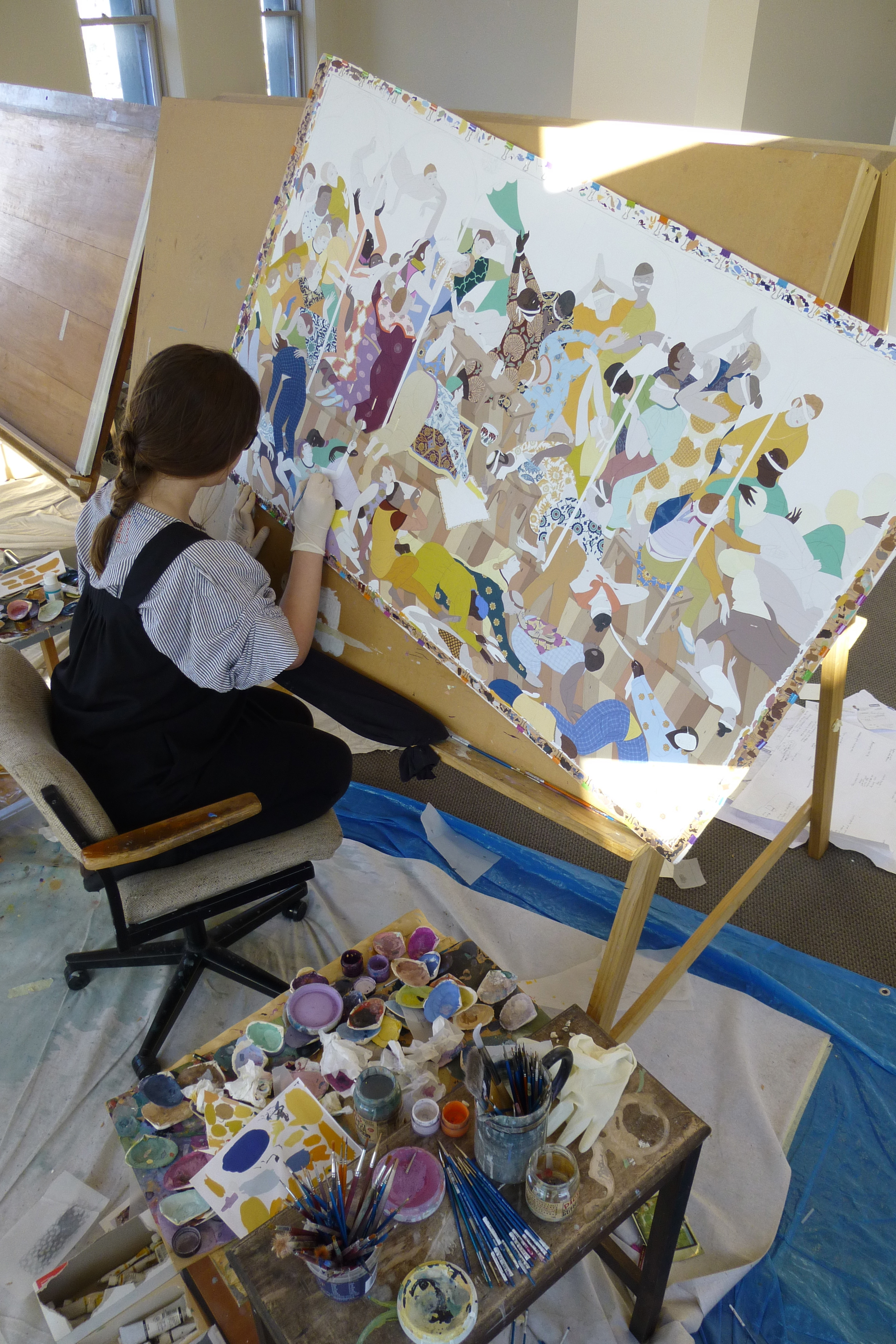
- Bush in studio
- Born: 9 June 1983; Dunedin, New Zealand
- Education: Dunedin School of Art
- Awards: Arts Foundation New Generation Award (2013), Frances Hodgkins Fellow at the University of Otago (2011), Art and Australia Contemporary Art Award (2009)

Kushana Bush (born 1983) is a New Zealand artist based in Dunedin. She was born in Dunedin and is best known for her paintings which typically blend historic and contemporary styles. Bush has won several awards for her works and has held international exhibitions.

== Work and career ==
Bush's gouache on paper paintings are known for their level of meticulous detail, use of flattened perspective, decorative patterning, and chalky colors. Her unique style of painting blends influences from the history of figurative art, drawing on medieval illuminated manuscripts like the book of hours, through to Giotto's frescoes, Japanese Shunga art, Mughal painting, Persian miniatures, Dutch religious paintings, Korean still life and folk art. The English painter Stanley Spencer is also a key influence for the artist, as are facets of global popular culture and fashion. As curator Lauren Gutsell explains: "These disparate sources bind Bush's works to both the past and the present; the historical and the contemporary. Human interactions, humor, ambiguity, dramatic tension and intimate scale are her tools to draw viewers into a private conversation and, in some cases, a spiritual space." Bush's early works often focused on injured characters, giving the works something of the air of Mexican retablo art, though this feature has been largely absent from her more recent work.

Bush received an Arts Foundation New Generation Award in 2013, and undertook the Frances Hodgkins Fellowship at the University of Otago in 2011. In 2009, the artist won the Art and Australia Contemporary Art Award, and undertook an Arts Centre/Asia NZ Foundation Residency at the National Art studio, Changdong, Seoul.

Bush's work is held in institutions across New Zealand as well as the Queensland Art Gallery, Art Gallery of New South Wales, National Gallery Victoria. She is represented by Darren Knight Gallery in Sydney and Brett McDowell Gallery in Dunedin.

== Life ==
Bush was born in Dunedin to English parents. Her father had studied art at Winchester School of Art, but did not complete a degree course. His interests in Asian history led to his daughter being named for the Kushan Empire, and the young Kushana's childhood was lived surrounded by books on Asian history and art. Bush went to Wakari Primary School and Balmacewen Intermediate School before studying at Otago Girls' High School. Bush completed a Bachelor of Fine Arts majoring in painting at the Dunedin School of Art in 2004.

== Recent exhibitions featuring the artist's work ==
- "Contemporary Art from Asia and the Pacific: Selected works from QAGOMA's Asia Pacific Triennial", Fundacion Centro Cultural Palacio La Moneda, Santiago, Chile, (until 1 December 2019)
- "Here we are", Art Gallery of New South Wales, Sydney, (24 August to 13 October 2019)
- "The 9th Asian Pacific Triennial of Contemporary Art," Queensland Art Gallery & Gallery of Modern Art, Brisbane (2019).
- "National Gallery of Victoria Triennial," National Gallery of Victoria, Melbourne (2018).
- "The Burning Hours," Te Uru Waitakere Contemporary Gallery, Auckland (2017–18).
- "Grayson Perry / Kushana Bush," City Gallery Wellington Te Whare Toi, Wellington (2015–16).
