= Āraiteuru Marae =

Māori marae in Dunedin, New Zealand

- Urban marae
- Interactive map of Āraiteuru Marae
- Etymology: Named after Āraiteuru, a waka (canoe) that brought Ngāi Tahu's ancestors to Otago.
- Coordinates: 45°51′40″S 170°29′30″E
- Location: 24 Shetland Street, Wakari, Dunedin, New Zealand
- Iwi: Pan-iwi
- Rūnanga: Āraiteuru Marae Council
- Opened: 2 February 1980
- Constructed: November 1979
- Wharenui: Te Paihere ("unity")

Āraiteuru Marae (also spelt Ārai Te Uru Marae) is a pan-iwi marae, in Wakari, Dunedin. It is named after Āraiteuru, an ancestral ocean-going canoe, and was the first urban marae in New Zealand. The marae describes itself as Manaaki whenua, manaaki tangata, haere whakamua — "caring for the land, caring for the people, moving forward" and (in a 2025 public statement to the local city council) as "a taonga – an irreplaceable cultural, economic, and social asset that stands not only as a beacon for Te Ao Māori in Dunedin but also as a welcoming inclusive hub for all people."

== History ==
=== Conception ===
A marae for Dunedin was first mooted in 1927 and discussed among Māori Battalion soldiers during World War II, who desired "... a place in our own land where we can be as one."

A meeting of elders and members of the Dunedin Māori community was held on 28 April 1964 with the aim of a facility "for all Maori people in the district, whatever their tribal origin." Early supporters included the local statutory Māori committees of the New Zealand Māori Council. A meeting on 3 July 1975 endorsed the idea of an urban marae and finalised the constitution. The Araiteuru Marae Council was legally incorporated on 5 January 1976. Further supporting organisations joined, including the 28 (Maori) Battalion Association, cultural groups, churches, and the University of Otago's Māori club. At the centre of the effort to establish a marae were Magda Wallscott and chairman Wi Duff.

A house on Maitland Street in the inner Dunedin suburb of Fernhill was the first meeting place for cultural activities and fundraising. Plans were sketched to develop this site, but it was considered an inconvenient and difficult location. The marae council acquired a perpetual lease on 15 April 1976 on 1.68ha of Crown land near Shetland St, Balmacewen, alongside Kaikorai Stream and Kaikorai Rugby Football Club. This land was originally intended for a highway linking Kaikorai Valley to Leith Valley and the Dunedin Northern Motorway.

Fundraising took about 30 years, with funding sources including Ōtākou Ngāi Tahu trust funds, the Department of Maori Affairs, and profits from the sale of the Maitland St property.

=== Opening ===
The community formally occupied the land at dawn on 28 November 1976, as elders led 300 people on to the whenua, reciting karakia and dedicating the land to the purpose, celebrating with a feast held at the adjacent rugby club. A hui was organised to conclude Māori Language Week on 24-25 September 1977. Accommodated in tents, this event included the site's first pōwhiri, thus establishing the status of the land as a marae, and therefore applicable for rebate of council rates, which was pivotal to the project's financial viability.

Metal plaque commemorating the opening of the first facility in 1980. The inscription reads: "Araiteuru Marae Hei whakamahara First building opened by The Hon B.M. Couch MP Minister of Maori Affairs 2 February 1980"

Construction of the first building was completed in November 1979. A religious service on 3 December 1979 to prepare the building for opening was led by Rev George Heta. The official opening was held on 2 February 1980, attended by over 1000 people, with Minister of Māori Affairs Ben Couch, MPs Stan Rodger, Whetu Tirikatene-Sullivan and Matiu Rata and mayor Cliff Skeggs as official guests. The new facility was "an educational centre, training in arts and crafts, customs, language classes, cultural evenings, tangihanga, and a meeting place for different organisations" including "Pacific Island and other ethnic groups." A book on the history of the city's Māori community, Maori Dunedin, was published to mark the building's opening.

A fund-raising carnival was held on the marae on 15 November 1980. On Waitangi Day 1987, the marae hosted a pōwhiri for officers of Royal New Zealand Navy frigate HMNZS Canterbury.

=== Arson attack and aftermath ===
The marae was subject to arson and graffiti on 18 August 1997, with fire destroying the marae dining area. The attack was described by the marae as "a tragic event, which has taken its toll on the ability of the local Maori community to recover from this grave injustice". The marae website stated: "Around the same time the Ngai Tahu Maori Law Centre was burnt to the ground. Both torchings coincided with the settling of the Kāi Tahu land claims, a critical landmark decision. The community understands little about this incident. What matters is to reconstruct and recreate a new vision for our future."

An editorial in the Otago Daily Times newspaper described the arson as "a tragic blow to the community" and "deeply disturbing ... that the fire was a racial attack of some kind ...". The Dunedin Multi-ethnic Council condemned the arson as comparable to the burning of a church. Māori and Pākehā gathered on 18 August 1997 to pray for forgiveness for those responsible as the site was bulldozed to prevent safety issues from debris. The arson was featured on TVNZ police show Crime scene on 8 September 1997, attracting 20 calls to police with information.

The cost of rebuilding the hall was later estimated at $320,000.

=== Fundraising and rebuilding ===
Funding for a replacement (and much expanded) facility came from insurance and grants from the New Zealand Lottery Grants Board as well as several local fundraising efforts:

- A concert headlined by Moana Maniapoto Jackson with local kapa haka groups and bands was held on 11 December 1997 to launch a national appeal to raise the $1.5–1.2 million to rebuild the Shetland St marae wharekai (dining-room), and build a wharenui, followed by a health clinic and gymnasium. A thousand people attended.
- "Out of the Ashes, part 2", a fundraiser in the Dunedin Town Hall on 1 May 1998, featuring Moana & The Moa Hunters
- Dunedin City Council approved a grant of $25,000 in April 1998.
- Te Waipounamu Festival, a cultural competition for performers from throughout the South Island in waiata (singing), poi, action song, haka, whaikorero (oratory) and choral singing on 24 October 1998
- A ball to celebrate Matariki on 7 June 2003

By March 2003, $1.35 million had been secured and the project had received the assent of local mana whenua Ōtākou Rūnaka, Te Rūnanga o Moeraki and Kāti Huirapa Runaka ki Puketeraki. Work by Naylor Love on the rebuild began in August 2003 (five years after the destruction) assisted by a $350,000 donation from the Community Trust of Otago and a sale of sponsored blocks of Oamaru stone for the building's exterior.

=== The rebuilt marae ===
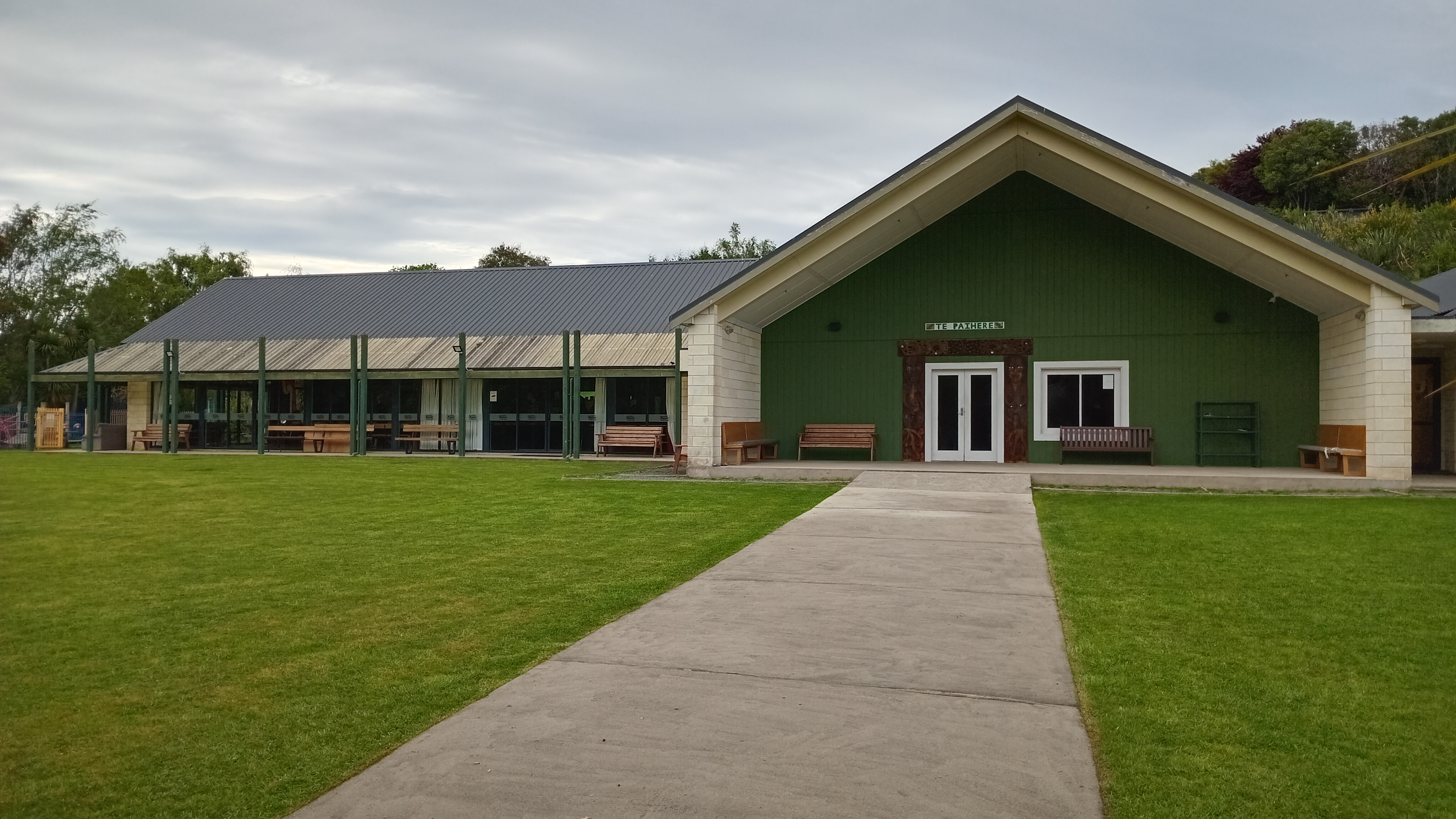
View across the marae atea (forecourt) to the wharekai (dining hall, left) and wharenui Te Paihere

The marae reopened in 2003.

In 2004, the marae hosted the Russia national rugby league team, and was granted $30,000 from Creative New Zealand to make tukutuku panels. The following year, the land was declared a Māori reserve, which gave Ngāi Tahu as mana whenua an official role at the marae. In the same year, a further racist graffiti attack inspired support from the community.

Two hundred Otago-based leaders from many iwi including Ngāpuhi, Tūhoe, Ngāi Tahu, Ngāti Kahungunu, Tainui and Ngāti Porou gathered at the marae in 2006 to celebrate He Whakaputanga, the document asserting New Zealand independence or rangatiratanga in 1835. In 2008, Āraiteuru Marae became the first smoke-free marae in Otago. It hosted 85 Bhutanese refugees for two weeks in 2011 after they were further displaced by the 2011 Christchurch earthquake

In 2019, Te Puni Kōkiri approved an investment of $10,000 "to support the sharing of Mātauranga Māori and history in communities as a way to encourage Te Ao Māori to be recognised and valued."

In February 2020 the marae marked its 40th anniversary. That year Te Puni Kōkiri approved funding of$55,000 (over two years) "To strengthen the capability and capacity of the organisation" followed by $15,000 funding in 2021 to create a marae development plan.

Otago Community Trust awarded a $91,000 grant in 2022 for building repairs to the kaumātua flats on the marae.

== Position in the community ==
The Dunedin City Council's policy on Māori partnership, Te tūhono ki te Māori, states: "Ko te Kaunihera o te Marae o Āraiteuru, te marae ā-tāone o Ōtepoti ka tū hai mākai mō te hapori mataawaka." "The Araiteuru Marae Council, Dunedin’s urban marae are also recognised as representing the mataawaka community in the city."

In a public statement to the city council in 2025, the marae described itself as playing "... a vital role in advancing the economic, health, wellbeing, and cultural aspirations of our communities. Through workshops, wānanga, healing programmes, environmental education, community celebrations, and cultural events, the marae fosters both personal and collective development. It serves as a training ground for young people, a support space for whānau in need, and a place for all people to engage with te ao Mãori in a meaningful, respectful, and safe way"

The trustees for the various member groups establish turangawaewae for their members, who thus have the rights of tangata whenua at the marae.

In a 2025 public statement to the local city council the marae identified the adjacent Kaikorai Stream as their "awa" and that its "...degradation is a disgrace and stands in direct opposition to [their] values and responsibilities...".

== Housing for elders ==
The marae features eight kaumātua flats for senior members of its community. These were opened on 13 November 1982 by Minister of Māori Affairs Ben Couch and reopened in 2025 after refurbishment, with improved insulation, double glazing, heat pumps and improved accessibility for people with disabilities.

== Garden and food sharing ==
The marae has a large vegetable garden and orchard which are used to provide food for a pātaka kai (community food pantry). The gardening (and forest restoration along Kaikorai Stream) are carried out in cooperation with the adjacent Shetland Street Community Garden.

Regular community meal events, called Pātaka Ora, are held, based on the Māori practice of manaakitanga – hospitality, generosity, and respect for guests and visitors.

== Language and culture classes ==
The marae began a programme of teaching Māori language and performance in 1981, with the aim of bringing different tribes of the area together. By 2009 it was also popular among Pākehā, and an all-girls kapa haka group was being set up.

== See also ==
- Ngā Hau e Whā National Marae, a similar marae in Christchurch
