= Brockville, New Zealand =

Suburb of Dunedin, New Zealand

Brockville
- Suburb
- Interactive map of Brockville
- Coordinates: 45.8671°S 170.4586°E
- Country: New Zealand
- City: Dunedin
- Local authority: Dunedin City Council

Area
  - Land: 147 ha (360 acres)

Population (June 2025)
  - Total: 2,450
  - Density: 1,670/km^{2} (4,320/sq mi)

	Halfway Bush
Brockville	Roslyn
	Bradford

Brockville is a residential suburb of the New Zealand city of Dunedin. It is located at the edge of the city's main urban area, 5.5 kilometres (3.4 mi) to the northwest of the city centre, but separated from it by both a ridge of hills and the Kaikorai Valley.

The name Brockville comes from early English settler Frederick Brock-Hollinshead, who, after arriving in Dunedin in 1853, began to build a substantial residence in this location. Brock-Hollinshead abandoned the house before completing it, and returned to England.

The suburb's main street is Brockville Road, which leaves Kaikorai Valley Road close to the boundary between the suburbs of Kaikorai and Bradford, winding up the slopes which forms the northwestern boundary of Kaikorai Valley. Frasers Creek winds around the edge of this slope. The scenic reserve of Fraser's Gully, through which this stream flows, lies immediately to the northeast of Brockville, between it and the suburb of Halfway Bush, ending on Frasers Road off Kaikorai Valley Road.

The main residential area of Brockville is centred on the upper section of Brockville Road, and the numerous crescents which branch off it. The suburb contains a kindergarten and a Brockville Full Primary School, which are located on this part of Brockville Road. The lower part of Brockville Road is occasionally regarded as a separate suburb known as Glenross, including the newly built houses on Sretlaw Place.

Brockville Road terminates at a junction with Dalziel Road, a semi-rural road which marks the edge of Dunedin's main urban area. This road links with Three Mile Hill Road above Halfway Bush in the north, running past the city's Mount Grand Reservoir before joining with another road leading down to the suburb of Burnside. A dry weather road links the southern end of Dalziel Road with Abbotsford.

Brockville possesses a church, corner shop, takeaway shop and a Little Sisters of the Poor convent and rest home. In addition to all these, Brockville has two residential parks, Brockville football and cricket grounds and skate ramp, and a community park and playground situated to the north of a small cluster of shops on Brockville Road.

== Demographics ==
Brockville covers 1.47 km^{2} (0.57 sq mi) and had an estimated population of 2,450 as of June 2025, with a population density of 1,667 people per km^{2}.

Historical population
Year	Pop.	±% p.a.
2006	2,439	—
2013	2,295	−0.87%
2018	2,409	+0.97%

Brockville had a population of 2,409 at the 2018 New Zealand census, an increase of 114 people (5.0%) since the 2013 census, and a decrease of 30 people (−1.2%) since the 2006 census. There were 885 households, comprising 1,176 males and 1,233 females, giving a sex ratio of 0.95 males per female. The median age was 36.1 years (compared with 37.4 years nationally), with 528 people (21.9%) aged under 15 years, 468 (19.4%) aged 15 to 29, 1,074 (44.6%) aged 30 to 64, and 339 (14.1%) aged 65 or older.

Ethnicities were 79.7% European/Pākehā, 14.1% Māori, 6.8% Pasifika, 6.4% Asian, and 5.1% other ethnicities. People may identify with more than one ethnicity.

The percentage of people born overseas was 15.9, compared with 27.1% nationally.

Although some people chose not to answer the census's question about religious affiliation, 55.8% had no religion, 29.1% were Christian, 0.9% had Māori religious beliefs, 0.9% were Hindu, 3.6% were Muslim, 0.4% were Buddhist and 2.2% had other religions.

Of those at least 15 years old, 294 (15.6%) people had a bachelor's or higher degree, and 495 (26.3%) people had no formal qualifications. The median income was $24,900, compared with $31,800 nationally. 138 people (7.3%) earned over $70,000 compared to 17.2% nationally. The employment status of those at least 15 was that 849 (45.1%) people were employed full-time, 264 (14.0%) were part-time, and 87 (4.6%) were unemployed.

== Notable people ==
- Eti Laufiso educationalist and advocate
- Marie Laufiso local government politician
- Pip Laufiso arts advisor

== Education ==
Brockville School is a co-educational state full primary school for Year 1 to 8 students, with a roll of 135 students as of July 2026.
