= Kaikorai Valley College =

State, co-educational, secondary school in Dunedin

- Te Kāreti o te Awaawa Kaikarae

Location
- 500 Kaikorai Valley Rd; Dunedin, Otago; New Zealand; 45.88206°S 170.466995°E

Information
- Type: State, Co-educational, Secondary
- Motto: Latin: Quaerite Et Invenietis (Seek and ye shall find)
- Established: 1958; 68 years ago
- Ministry of Education Institution no.: 381
- Principal: Jatin Bali
- Enrolment: 434 (July 2026)
- Socio-economic decile: 5M
- Website: www.kvcollege.co.nz

Kaikorai Valley College (Māori: Te Kāreti o te Awaawa Kaikarae) is a medium-sized co-educational secondary school in Dunedin, New Zealand. Initially starting as Kaikorai Valley High School in 1958, the school combined with Kenmure Intermediate School in 1997 to become Kaikorai Valley College. The school caters for students in years 7 to 13. It celebrated its 50th jubilee in 2008 and its 60th jubilee in 2018.

== History ==
=== Construction and Development ===
Kaikorai Valley College was formerly known as Kaikorai Valley High School, and was opened to pupils on 4 February 1958. The decision to build a new high school in Dunedin was made due to a surge in the roll of secondary students in the city during the 1950s. There were four possible locations — Tainui, Ocean Beach, Kaikorai Valley, and Balmacewen — suburbs of Dunedin.

=== First Assembly ===
The school's first assembly commenced in C block, where it was the only completed building of the planned four single-storey blocks that were able to accommodate roughly 600 pupils. During the school's inaugural assembly, the first principal, Mr Rex Maslin, introduced the new catalogue of staff members to the pupils as well as introducing them to the school's new motto, ‘Quaerite et invenietis’, which was Latin for 'seek and you shall find'.

=== Union with Kenmure Intermediate ===
On the 4th of June, 1997, the amalgamation of Kaikorai Valley High School with the former Dunedin intermediate school, Kenmure Intermediate School, resulted in the formation of Kaikorai Valley College.

Upon the launch of KVC, it became one of New Zealand's first urban based and co-educational colleges for Year 7 to 13. During the union with Kenmure Intermediate, the merger came with an entire refurbishment of C block to be used as a dedicated homeroom area for the Year 7 to 8 students and their staff. KVC was officially launched by the former Minister of Education, Wyatt Crrech, following a formal welcome to the school.

== International relations ==
The college has approximately 65 international students, and has sister school relationships with Sakuragaoka High School, Kun-ei Girls High School and Myojo Gakuen in Japan; Po Leung Kuk Ngan Po Ling College in Hong Kong; and Harbin Number 13 Middle School in China.

== House system ==
Kaikorai Valley College operates a House system designed to build school spirit, encourage participation, and foster a sense of belonging across all year levels. The current system consists of four Houses — Kōwhai, Mataī, Rātā, and Tōtara — which provide opportunities for friendly competition in sporting, cultural, academic, and community events. The houses are named after the following New Zealand native trees:

- Kōwhai - Sophora microphylla ( small-leaved kōwhai ) and Sophora tetraptera ( large-leaved kōwhai )
- Mataī - Prumnopitys taxifolia ( mataī or black pine )
- Rātā - Metrosideros umbellata ( southern rātā )
- Tōtara - Podocarpus totara ( tōtara )

=== History of houses ===
Houses were first introduced in the mid-1960s, when the school was known as Kaikorai Valley High School (KVHS). The original houses were named after influential individuals connected to the school:

- Cobham – named after Charles John Lyttelton, Baron Cobham, Governor-General of New Zealand, who officially opened the school in November 1958.
- Manton – named after Guy R. Manton, the first Chairman of the KVHS Board of Governors, an English-born Cambridge graduate who retained an ongoing interest in the school after leaving Dunedin in 1965.
- Maslin – named after Rex W.H. Maslin, the first Principal of KVHS, appointed in 1958, who worked to establish the school’s reputation before he died in 1964.
- Wright – named after Leonard M. Wright, an Australian-born businessman and the 49th mayor of Dunedin, who played a leading role in planning the school and was widely respected in the community.

=== Discontinuation of old system ===
The original houses were later discontinued in 1972 and were replaced in 2015 with the current system, to reflect on, and support local Māori heritage.

=== Modern system ===
The modern House system awards points for participation, leadership, and demonstration of the school’s PRIDE values (Participation, Respect, Inquiry, Diversity, and Environment). Students receive House badges in their House's colour, and points contribute to the PRIDE Cup, awarded each term, and the House Shield, presented at the senior end-of-year prize-giving.

The system aims to:

- Build connections between students of different year levels.
- Encourage participation in sporting, cultural, and academic activities.
- Provide avenues for community engagement.
- Promote healthy competition and student identity.
- Strengthen school values while creating leadership opportunities.

== Values ==
Kaikorai Valley College’s school culture is based on five core values, collectively known as PRIDE (Whakahī o te Kura). These values underpin teaching, learning, and student life across the school.

- Participation – involvement in academic, sporting, cultural, and extracurricular activities
- Respect – for oneself, others, and the environment
- Inquiry – curiosity and engagement in teaching and learning
- Diversity – inclusion of cultural, international, special education, and gifted learners
- Environment – care for the school grounds, local stream, community, and wider global environment

These values are embedded in daily school practices and behaviour expectations.

== Positive Behaviour for Learning (PB4L) ==
Kaikorai Valley College participates in the Ministry of Education’s Positive Behaviour for Learning (PB4L) initiative, which focuses on promoting positive behaviour and engagement across the school environment.

In 2015, the school introduced PRIDE cards and the PRIDE Cup to recognise students who consistently demonstrate the school’s values. Students receiving PRIDE cards are entered into regular PRIDE draws, where prizes are awarded. Draws are conducted using a custom-built machine known as Mana.

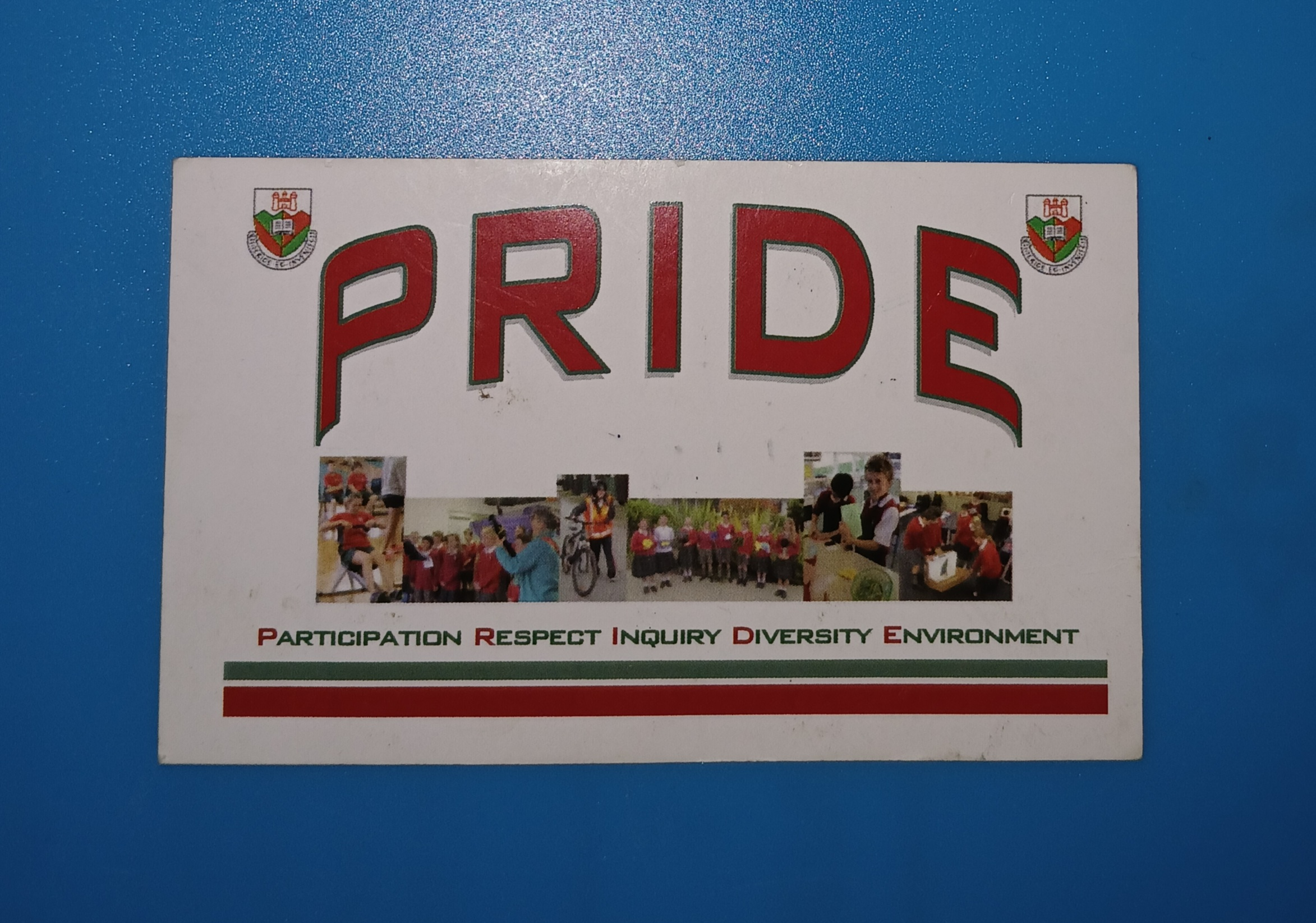
Pride Card

In the early 2020s, some PRIDE draws were delivered in an alternative video-based format rather than through in-person assemblies. These videos featured themed presentations, including a road-trip-style format filmed around Dunedin, while retaining the same student recognition purpose.

== Facilities and building history ==
Kaikorai Valley College has undergone extensive renovations and upgrades over the years, modernising its learning environment while maintaining accessibility and functionality. Facilities include its own theatre and dance studio, well-equipped computer suites, science laboratories, a full-sized gymnasium, open-plan design and technology areas, and a disabled and special needs unit. Furthermore, the brand new administration block was opened by John Key in 2012, enhancing administrative capacity and modernising the campus entrance.

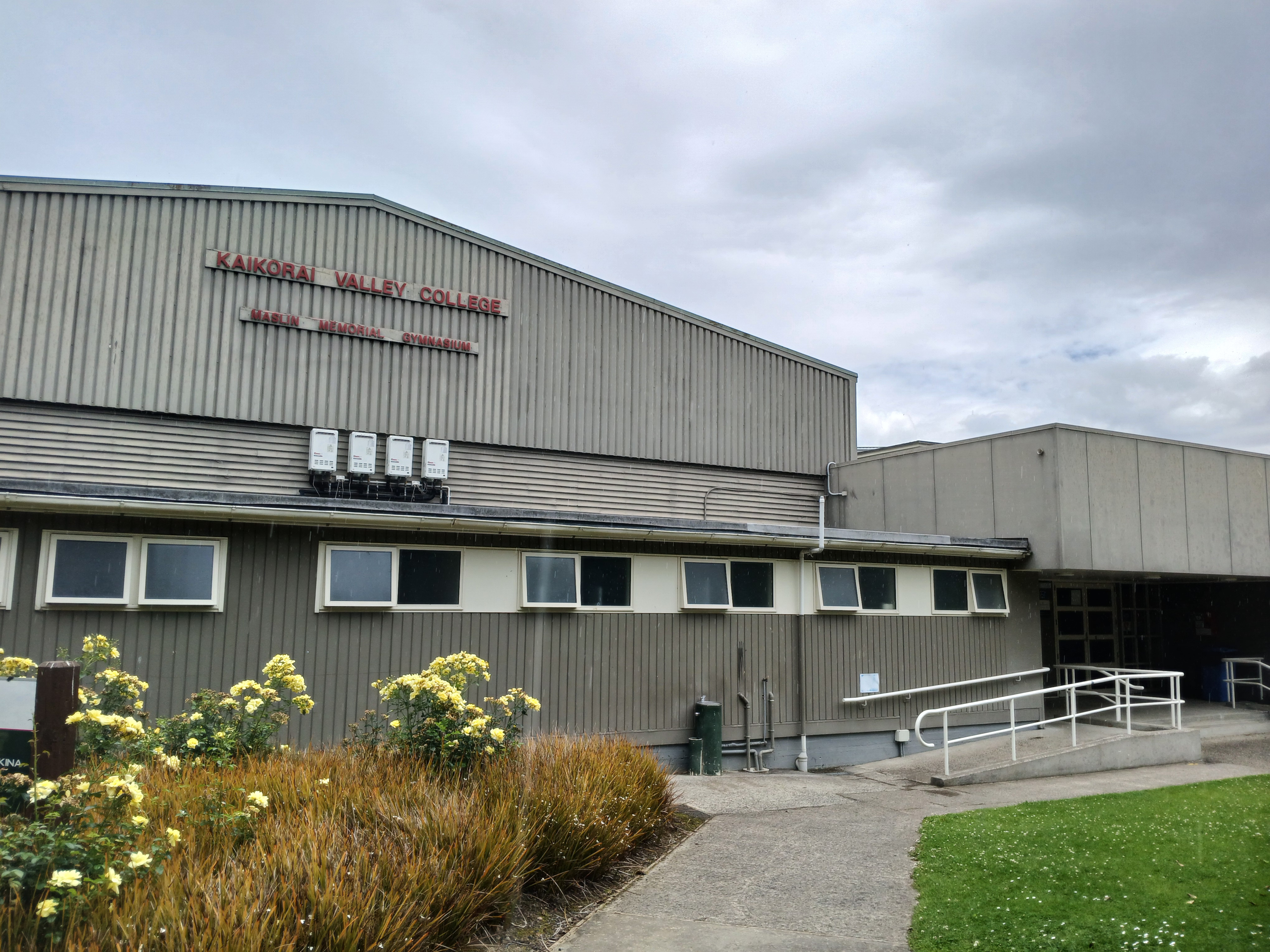
Maslin Memorial Gymnasium

=== New Gymnasium ===
The college’s full-sized gymnasium was constructed in 2006 to provide additional covered indoor physical education and sporting facilities for students and the wider community. Prior to its construction, the older Maslin Memorial Gymnasium was considered insufficient for the school’s needs due to increases in roll size and demand from both school and community groups.

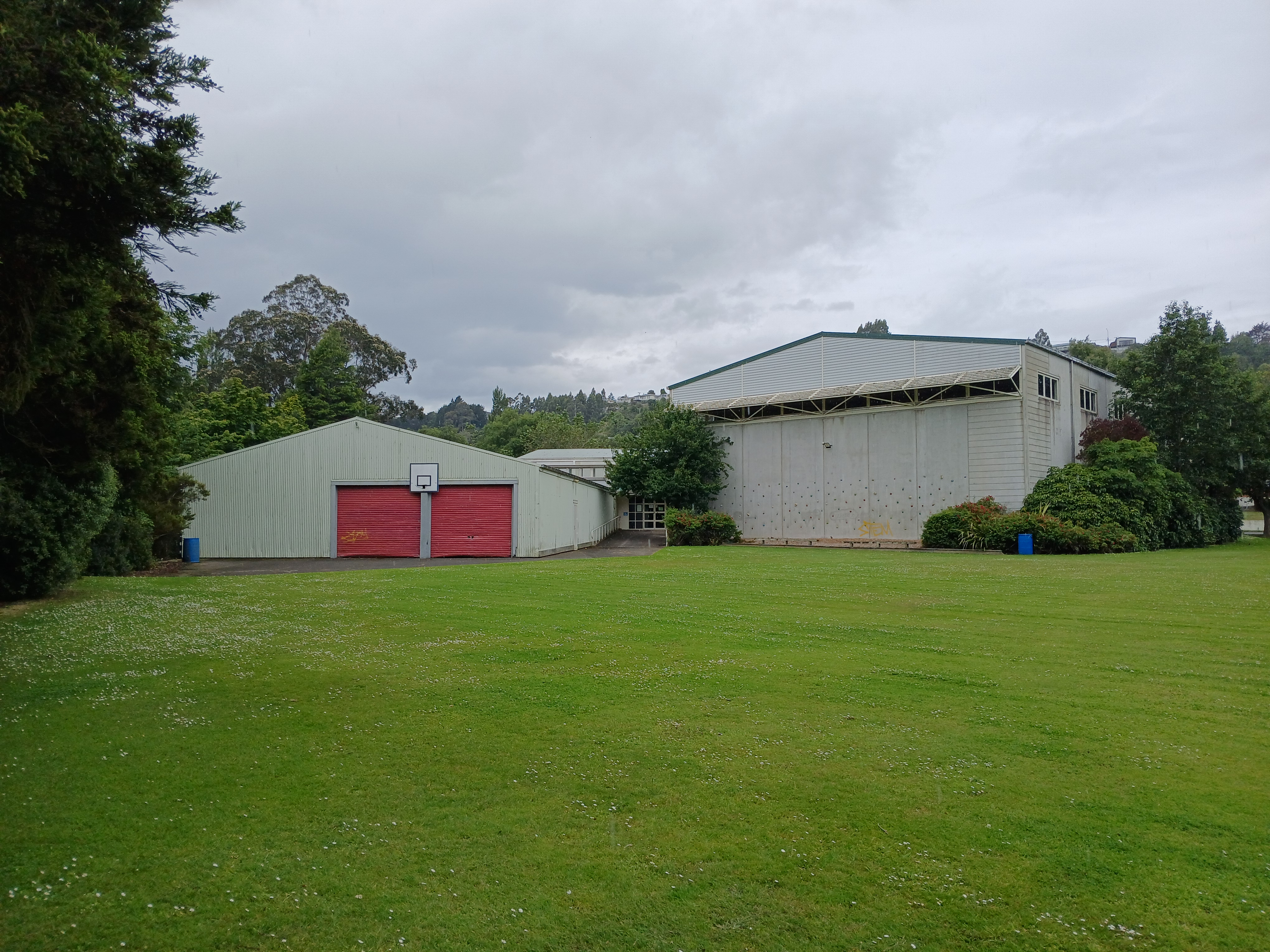
View of the Maslin Memorial Gymnasium and the new gymnasium

Kaikorai Valley College now has two gymnasiums on campus, supporting a wide range of indoor sporting activities such as basketball, badminton, volleyball, futsal, and netball for school teams and physical education programmes. The gymnasium has also been used for pre-test training by the All Blacks rugby team.

The construction of the gymnasium was supported by a significant community fundraising effort. The appeal involved past students, teachers, parents, and local organisations, coordinated by a dedicated committee including Chairman Don Lawson, Principal Philip Craigie, Board members, and other community volunteers. This collaborative approach allowed the college to supplement Ministry of Education funding and engage the local community in the project, reflecting the gymnasium’s dual role as a school and community sporting facility.

=== Martha Gillies Library ===
The former library, known as the Martha Gillies Library, was located north of the gymnasium on the opposite side of the stream and was demolished in 2020. The building was removed due to its age, ongoing water ingress issues, and the presence of asbestos cladding. Library services were relocated and refurbished within the former music block, the northernmost building on campus.

=== Music Suite ===
In 2017, B Block was reconfigured to create a new music suite. Internal walls were redesigned to increase open space and storage capacity, improving facilities for music teaching and performance.

=== Braithwaite Centre ===
In 2019, the Braithwaite Centre, which supports students with additional learning needs, underwent an upgrade. The project expanded the centre and included improved access, larger windows, new flooring, and the reconfiguration of spaces for laundry and quiet learning areas.

=== Science Block (S Block) ===
In 2023, S Block, the school’s science block, underwent its first major refurbishment since its original construction. The upgrade modernised laboratory spaces and supporting facilities to meet current Ministry of Education standards.

=== Food Technology Classroom ===
In 2024, the food technology classroom was refurbished. Works included new flooring, acoustic wall linings, updated joinery and appliances, glass splashbacks, and improvements to the adjoining teacher’s office, increasing bench space and storage capacity.

=== Roofing upgrades ===
More recent roofing upgrades were carried out across A, B, C, and D blocks. The re-roofing project was managed by Naylor Love and involved replacing aging materials to improve weather resistance and reduce long-term maintenance requirements.

== Outdoor education and environmental studies ==
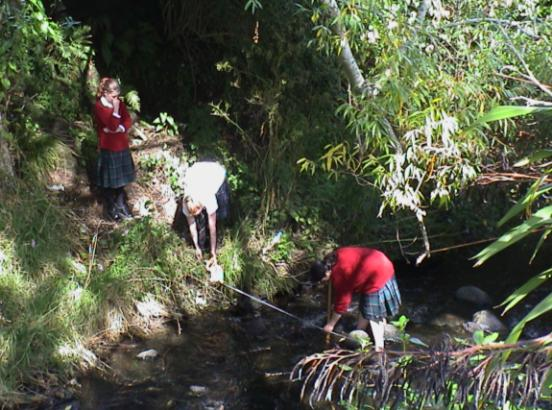
Kaikorai Valley College students study the stream flow.

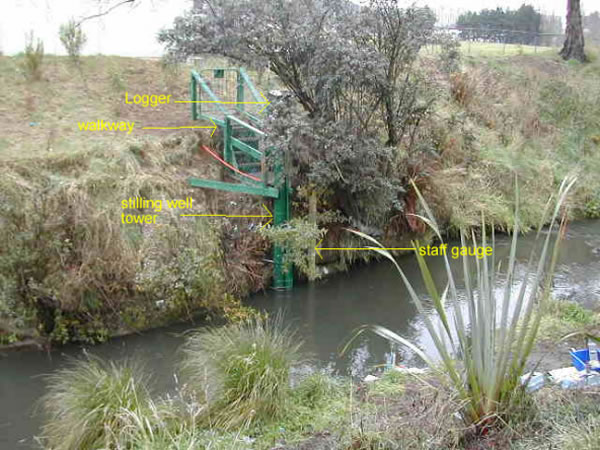
Measuring equipment used to study hydrology

Pupils of Kaikorai Valley College use the adjacent Kaikorai Stream for outdoor education, studying water quality and flow, learning fly fishing and monitoring waste water.

The college also operates an urban farm located on underutilised land within the school grounds. The farm was established in 2014 with funding from the Ministry of Education and later received additional support from the Otago Community Trust. Developed from an unused grassed area, the site was converted into a working outdoor learning space used for applied learning in science, sustainability, and agriculture-related subjects.

Learning activities at the urban farm have included horticulture, animal care, orchard planting, and small-scale livestock management, along with cross-curricular use in mathematics, art, and te reo Māori. The facility has also been used by visiting pupils from local primary schools as part of community engagement initiatives.

Teacher Dr Simon McMillan has been a lead figure in the development and educational use of the urban farm, supporting student-led projects and integrating the farm into classroom learning across multiple subject areas.

== Enrolment ==
=== Roll count ===
As of July 2026, Kaikorai Valley College has roll of 434 students, of which 76 (17.5%) identify as Māori.

=== Socio-economic decile ===
As of 2026, the school has an Equity Index of 502, placing it amongst schools whose students have many socioeconomic barriers to achievement (roughly equivalent to deciles 2 and 3 under the former socio-economic decile system).

== Principals ==
- Rex W.H. Maslin: 1958 — 1964 (6 years)
- George F. Ridley: 1965 — 1974 (9 years)
- David Rathbone: 1975 — 1984 (9 years)
- Andrew C. Pratt: 1985 — 1993 (8 years)
- Don Lawson: 1994 — 2001 (7 years)
- Philip J. Craigie: 2002 — 2012 (10 years)
- Rick Geerlofs: 2012 — 2023 (11 years)
- Jatin Bali: 2024 — present (Current)

== Notable alumni ==
- Dr. Richard Blaikie, deputy vice chancellor and professor of physics at Otago University
- Bridget Robinson, medical oncologist at Christchurch Hospital
- Howard Broad, former New Zealand Commissioner of Police 2006—2011
- Shayne Carter, singer and songwriter for Straitjacket Fits and Dimmer
- Robert Sarkies, film director
- Helen Heslop, professor at Baylor College of Medicine in Houston
- Clayton Weatherston, former University of Otago economics tutor, convicted murderer

== See also ==
- List of schools in Otago
- Kaikorai Valley
