= Wakari Hospital =

- Te Whatu Ora
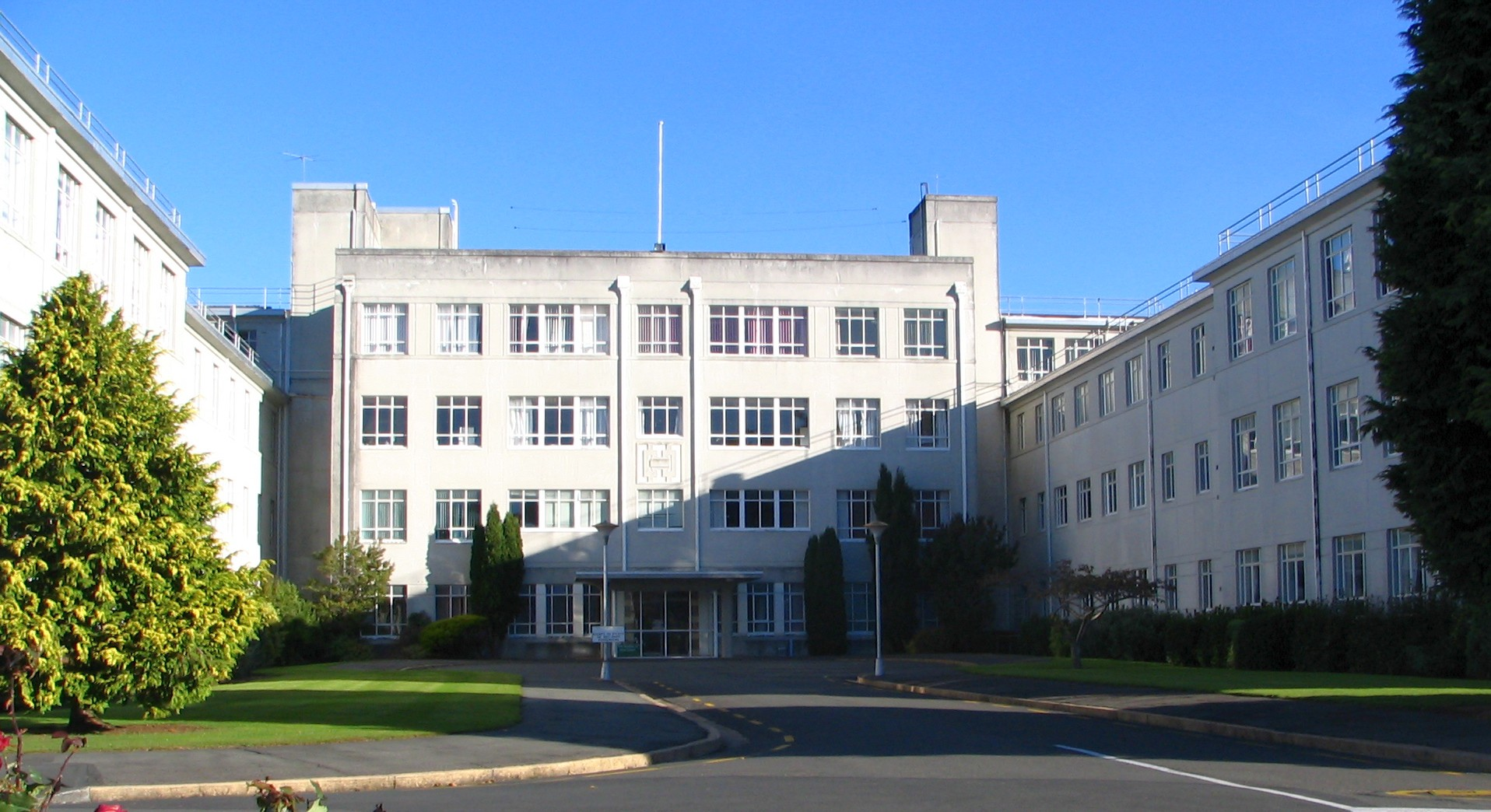
- Main Block entrance, Wakari Hospital in 2008

Geography
- Location: Taieri Road, Dunedin, New Zealand
- Coordinates: 45.858994°S 170.472783°E

Organisation
- Care system: Public
- Type: Psychiatric & Rehabilitation

Services
- Emergency department: Psychiatric
- Beds: 90

History
- Founded: 1915

Links
- Website: http://www.southerndhb.govt.nz/
- Lists: Hospitals in New Zealand

Wakari Hospital is a hospital located in Dunedin, New Zealand.

It is situated in the suburb of Wakari, about three kilometres north-west of the city centre. The hospital is operated by the Te Whatu Ora (formerly Southern District Health Board) and is closely associated with Dunedin Hospital.

It contains specialised psychiatric services but also cares for people with intellectual disability and people undergoing physical rehabilitation. It has units for forensic psychiatry, psychiatric emergency services, long- and short-term secure psychiatric units, Māori mental health, physical rehabilitation and increasingly community out-reach services such as public health and district nursing.

== History ==
From 1915 the site was initially an infectious diseases centre, and later a sanatorium. In 1957 it was redeveloped as a general hospital, serving as the main Otago hospital while the Dunedin Hospital was being redeveloped in the 1970s. In the early 1980s, the Nurses' home was leased to the University for use as a student hostel, this being taken back with the closure of the Cherry Farm Hospital in 1992.

Wakari continued as a geriatric and psychiatric care facility, the geriatric wards gradually being wound down through the nineties with government reforms to privatise long-term care. The care of the elderly assessment and rehabilitation wards were transferred back to Dunedin Hospital. Attempts were made to sell the main block of the hospital, which found occasional use as a facility for live-in drug trials and even a temporary accommodation during important rugby tests.

== Current directions ==
Currently the main block is being redeveloped to house a variety of out-reach services such as Public Health and District Nursing, moving out of expensive leased premises and centralising in properties the Southern District Health Board already owns. Continuing consideration is being given to whether all the site needs to be retained and it has been proposed that some more land be sold to Leslie Groves Hospital.

On 3 July 2026, Health New Zealand ordered the closure of Wakari Hospital's forensic intellectual disability unit "ward 10A" after an inspection by Chief Ombudsman John Allen in March 2026 found "compelling evidence of punitive and coercive treatment" of ward patients. Examples of such treatment included a patient being secluded in their room for 18 months, patients being blocked from using the toilet and a patient being moved around the ward on a bariatric evacuation drag mat. Health New Zealand confirmed that it had halted new admissions to the ward on 24 April and had begun relocating the patients to other facilities from May 2026.
