= Flagstaff (Otago) =

Hill in Otago Region, New Zealand

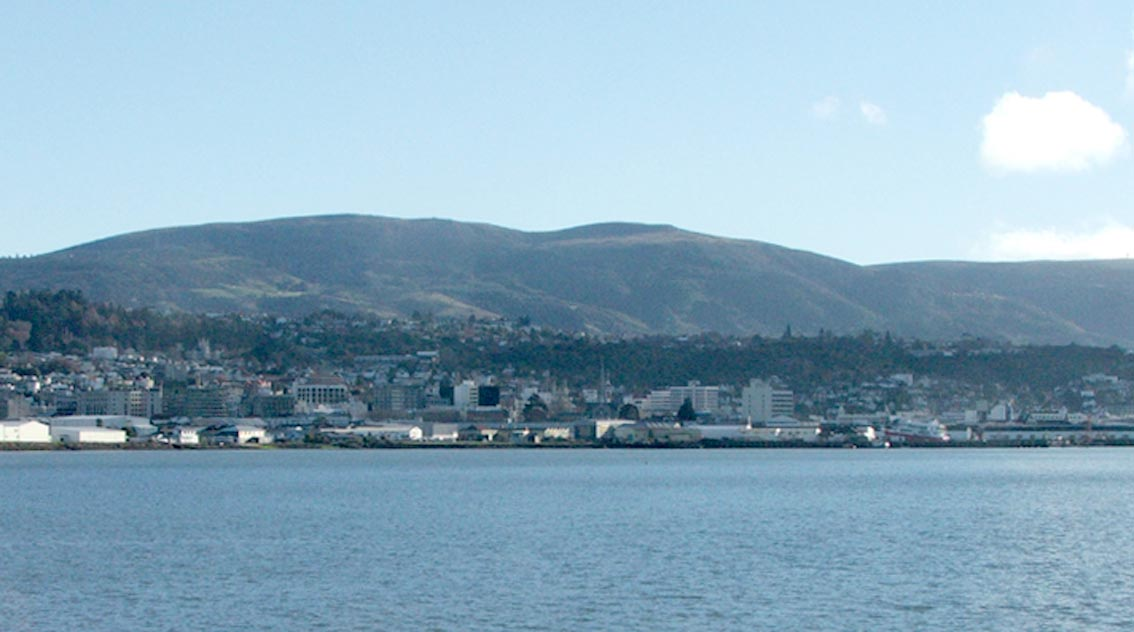
- Flagstaff rises above central Dunedin in this view from the western end of Otago Harbour.

Highest point
- Elevation: 668 m (2,192 ft)
- Prominence: 140 m (460 ft)
- Parent peak: Swampy Summit
- Isolation: 3.4 km (2.1 mi) to Swampy Summit
- Coordinates: 45.829°S 170.465°E

Naming
- Native name: Te Whanaupaki (Māori)

Geography
- Country: New Zealand
- Region: Otago
- District: Dunedin

Geology
- Volcanic zone: Dunedin Volcano

Climbing
- Easiest route: Pineapple Flagstaff Walk

Flagstaff, known in Māori as Te Whanaupaki, is a prominent hill overlooking the northwest of the city of Dunedin, in New Zealand's South Island. Together with Mount Cargill, which lies to its northeast, it dominates the skyline of the city. Flagstaff lies seven kilometres to the north of Dunedin's city centre.

The hill was known by the Māori as Whakari, and the Southern Māori form of this name is still used for the Dunedin suburb of Wakari, which lies to the south of Flagstaff. The city's first road route to the Taieri Plains, which lie to the west, skirted the slopes of Flagstaff, and is still used as an alternative route out of the city.

Flagstaff rises to a height of 668 metres (2,192 ft), and is part of the rim of the Dunedin Volcano, a long-extinct volcano of which the crater forms the Otago Harbour. The Pineapple Track, part of Dunedin's Skyline Walkway, crosses the peak of Flagstaff. The track's unusual name dates from the 1920s, when a local grocer used to act as a guide to the top of Flagstaff, handing out tins of pineapple as a refreshment at the top. The empty cans were often left behind, and were frequently seen along the side of the track as unofficial marker posts. This track, though not an arduous walk, needs to be treated with care, as the weather around Flagstaff can be extremely unpredictable.

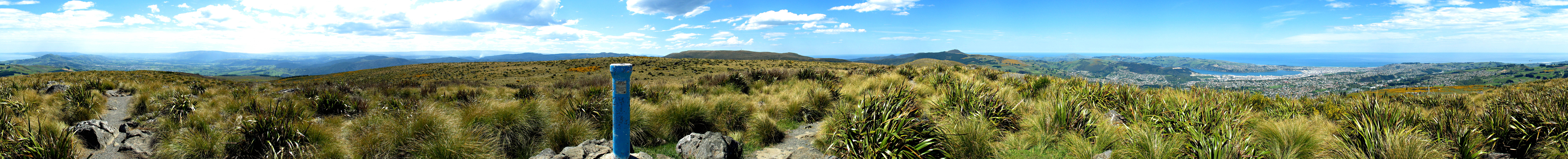
View from the summit of Flagstaff, looking over the city of Dunedin.
