= Kaikorai Valley =

Valley in Dunedin, New Zealand

- Suburb
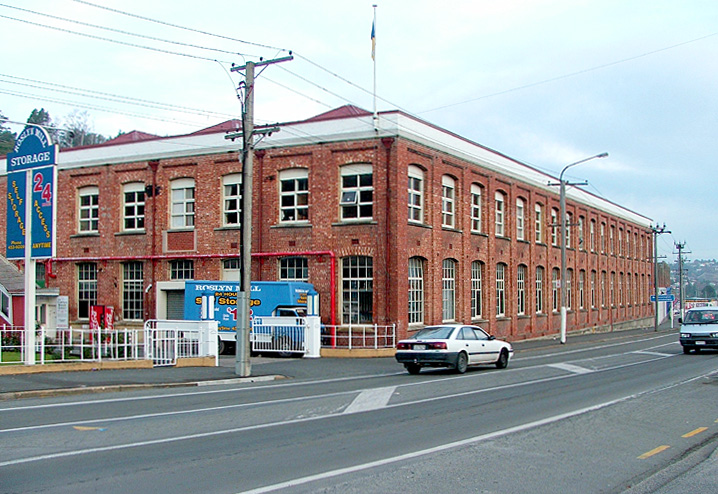
- The former Roslyn Woollen Mill buildings in Bradford
- Interactive map of Kaikorai Valley
- Coordinates: 45.8768°S 170.4708°E
- Country: New Zealand
- City: Dunedin
- Local authority: Dunedin City Council

Area
  - Land: 454 ha (1,120 acres)

Population (June 2025)
  - Total: 3,220
  - Density: 709/km^{2} (1,840/sq mi)

	Brockville	Wakari
	Kaikorai Valley	City Rise
Abbotsford	Green Island	Calton Hill

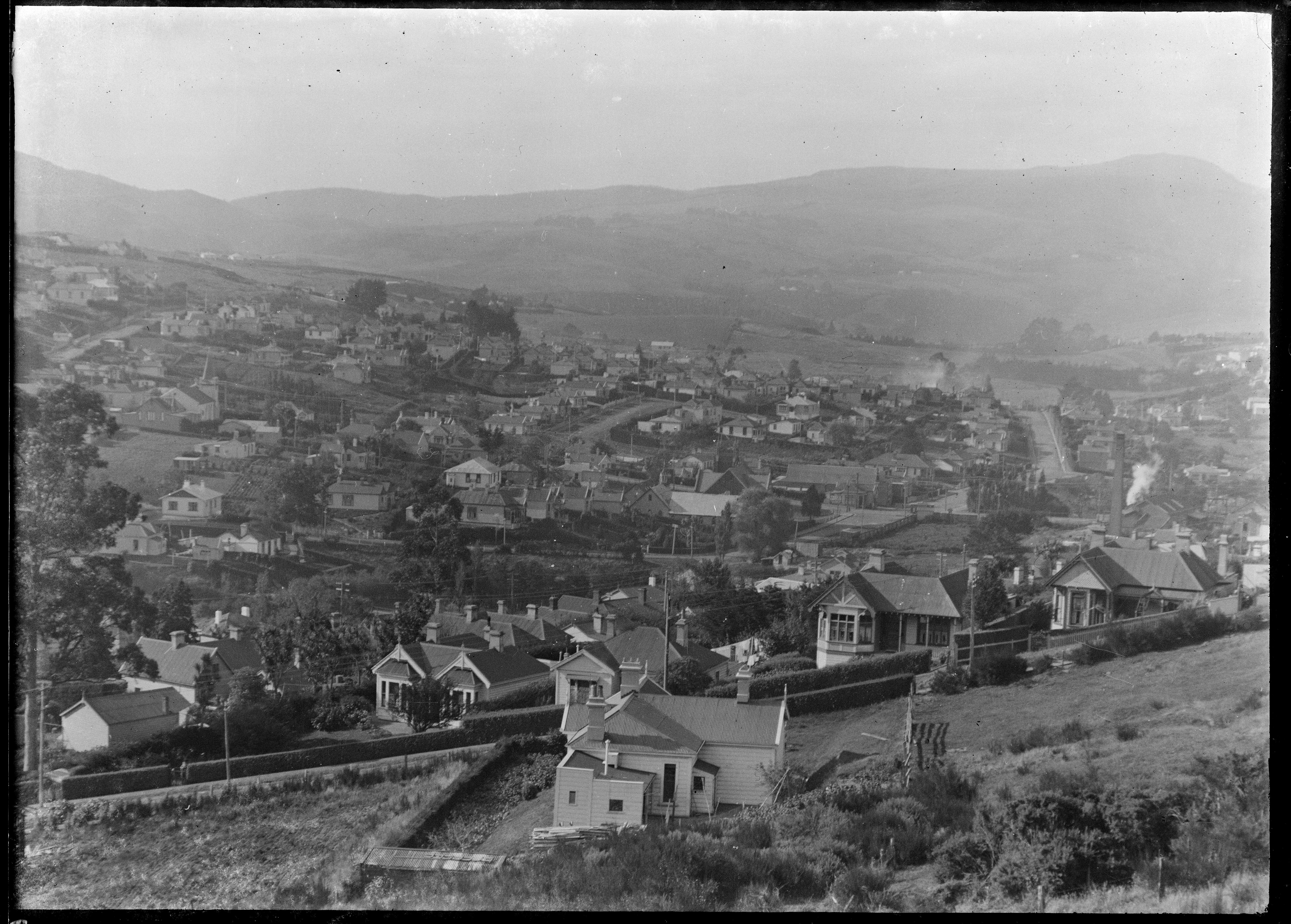
Kaikorai Valley in 1926

Kaikorai Valley is a long broad valley which runs through the west of the New Zealand city of Dunedin, 5 kilometres (3.1 mi) to the west of the city centre. It is the valley of a small stream, the Kaikorai Stream, which runs from northeast to southwest down the length of the valley.

The valley provides a route into central Dunedin (Kaikorai Valley Road) which avoids the steep climb and descent over Lookout Point into Caversham, instead allowing for a gradual climb to the top of Stuart Street at Roslyn before a steep drop into the heart of the city. The valley contains several suburbs, largely isolated from the city centre by the ridge which forms the valley's eastern edge. This ridge was part of the crater wall of the long-extinct Dunedin Volcano.

The valley is largely occupied by light industrial and wholesale businesses. Much of the land to the west of the valley is semi-rural; the eastern wall contains residential properties.

The valley is home to three distinct suburbs: Kaikorai, Bradford, and Kenmure, while a fourth suburb, Burnside, lies at the valley's mouth, close to the junction of Kaikorai Valley Road and the Dunedin Southern Motorway, part of State Highway 1.

== Kaikorai ==
The suburb of Kaikorai sits at the head of the valley. This suburb is largely residential, sitting close to the junction of Kaikorai Valley Road and Stuart Street, to the west of which Stuart Street becomes Taieri Road. Taieri Road links with the outer suburbs of Halfway Bush and Helensburgh before traversing the rugged Three Mile Hill, eventually emerging on the Taieri Plains. A complex junction links Stuart Street, Taieri Road, and Kaikorai Valley Road, and also provides a link with Highgate, the main road through the suburbs of Roslyn (which lies on the ridge immediately to the east of Kaikorai) and Maori Hill. The suburb of Wakari lies immediately to the northwest of Kaikorai.

Notable features of Kaikorai include a KFC restaurant, a bowling alley, a sports ground, Ellis Park, and the Frasers Gully reserve. Close to the southern end of the suburb is a significant road junction linking Kaikorai Valley Road with the suburb of Brockville to the west.

== Bradford ==
Bradford is a smaller, more ill-defined suburb lying in the centre of the Kaikorai Valley and in a small series of streets which lie immediately to its west. Like other parts of the lower valley, it contains numerous commercial properties such as wholesalers and car yards. Bradford Primary school lies in the suburb, which is named after Bradford in Yorkshire, England, because of its important textile mill industry.

A road junction close to the boundary of Bradford and Kaikorai close to the former Roslyn Woollen Mill links Kaikorai Valley Road with Stone Street, which rises rapidly to the east to meet the ridge at Belleknowes. A disused quarry is a notable feature on this road.

== Kenmure ==
Kenmure occupies much of the lower valley and the slopes immediately to its east which straddle the land between Kaikorai Valley Road and Mornington Road. Most of these properties are reached by either Kenmure Road, which climbs the hill to join these other two roads, or by one of the streets which lead off it. This large suburb is predominantly residential, although it contains more wholesale commercial properties, some light industrial works, and several car sales yards, all on Kaikorai Valley Road. The suburb is linked via Mornington Road with the suburbs of Mornington to the north and Balaclava to the south.

A major feature of Kenmure is one of the city's larger secondary schools, Kaikorai Valley College (formerly Kaikorai Valley High School and Kenmure Intermediate School), which lies on Kaikorai Valley Road.

== Demographics ==
Kaikorai Valley covers 4.54 km^{2} (1.75 sq mi) and had an estimated population of 3,220 as of June 2025, with a population density of 709 people per km^{2}.

Historical population
Year	Pop.	±% p.a.
2006	3,048	—
2013	3,054	+0.03%
2018	3,126	+0.47%

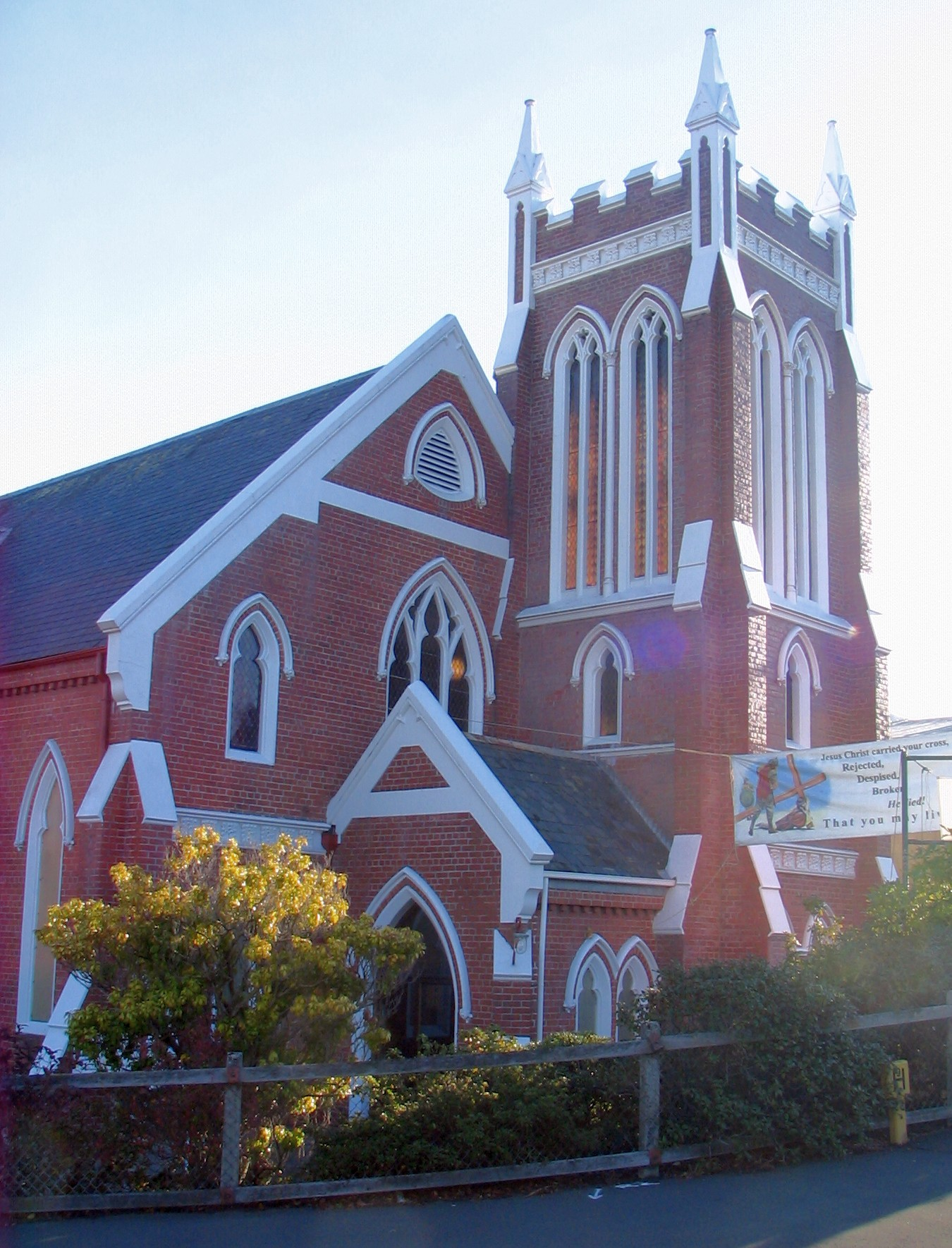
Kaikorai Presbyterian Church

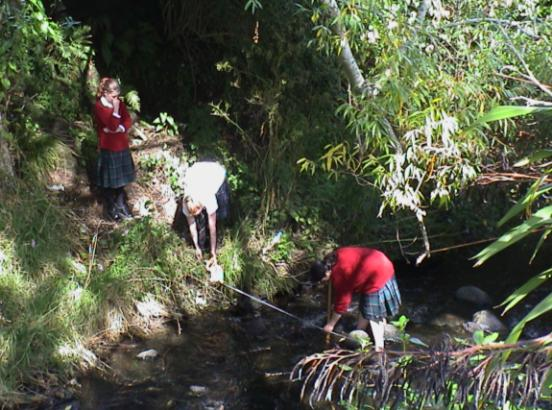
Kaikorai Valley College students study the Kaikorai Stream

Kaikorai Valley had a population of 3,126 at the 2018 New Zealand census, an increase of 72 people (2.4%) since the 2013 census, and an increase of 78 people (2.6%) since the 2006 census. There were 1,221 households, comprising 1,521 males and 1,602 females, giving a sex ratio of 0.95 males per female, with 600 people (19.2%) aged under 15 years, 603 (19.3%) aged 15 to 29, 1,470 (47.0%) aged 30 to 64, and 450 (14.4%) aged 65 or older.

Ethnicities were 87.4% European/Pākehā, 8.8% Māori, 3.4% Pasifika, 7.3% Asian, and 2.6% other ethnicities. People may identify with more than one ethnicity.

The percentage of people born overseas was 16.5, compared with 27.1% nationally.

Although some people chose not to answer the census's question about religious affiliation, 58.4% had no religion, 30.6% were Christian, 0.1% had Māori religious beliefs, 1.2% were Hindu, 1.2% were Muslim, 0.7% were Buddhist and 1.8% had other religions.

Of those at least 15 years old, 609 (24.1%) people had a bachelor's or higher degree, and 459 (18.2%) people had no formal qualifications. 375 people (14.8%) earned over $70,000 compared to 17.2% nationally. The employment status of those at least 15 was that 1,365 (54.0%) people were employed full-time, 387 (15.3%) were part-time, and 78 (3.1%) were unemployed.

Individual statistical areas
Name	Area (km^{2})	Population	Density (per km^{2})	Households	Median age	Median income
Kaikorai-Bradford	3.44	1,182	344	438	38.3 years	$30,900
Kenmure	1.10	1,944	1,767	783	37.5 years	$36,400
New Zealand					37.4 years	$31,800

== Education ==
Kaikorai Valley College is a state secondary school for Year 7 to 13 students, with a roll of 430 students. The school started in 1958.

Bradford School is a state contributing primary school for Year 1 to 6 students, with a roll of 94 students.

Both these schools are co-educational. Rolls are as of March 2026.
