= Roslyn Overbridge =

Bridge in New Zealand

Coordinates: 45.866714°S 170.491102°E

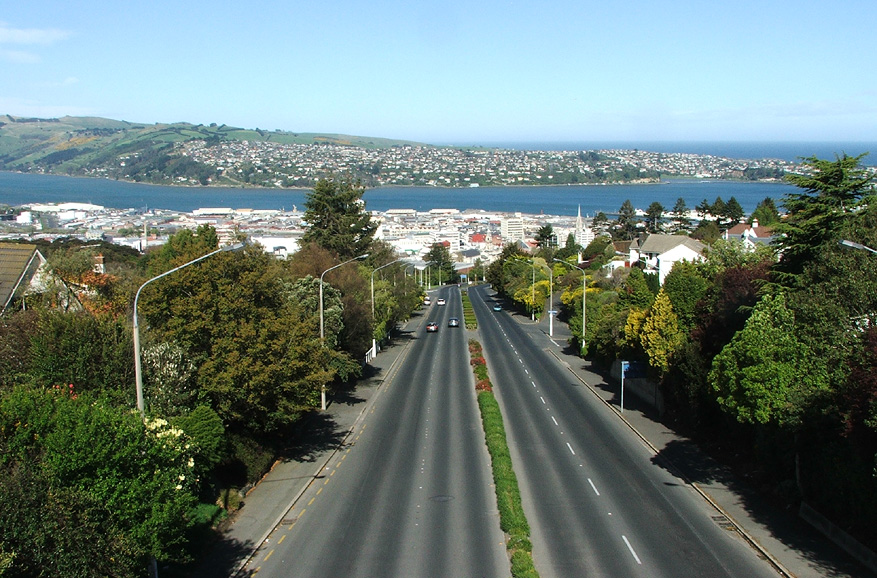
The view from Roslyn Overbridge

The Roslyn Overbridge (also known as Roslyn Bridge or Highgate Bridge) is a landmark in the New Zealand city of Dunedin. Located 2.5 kilometres (1.6 mi) northwest of the city's centre (The Octagon), it allows for the passage of the arterial Upper Stuart Street under Highgate, the main suburban road which runs along the ridge of hills which surrounds the city centre.

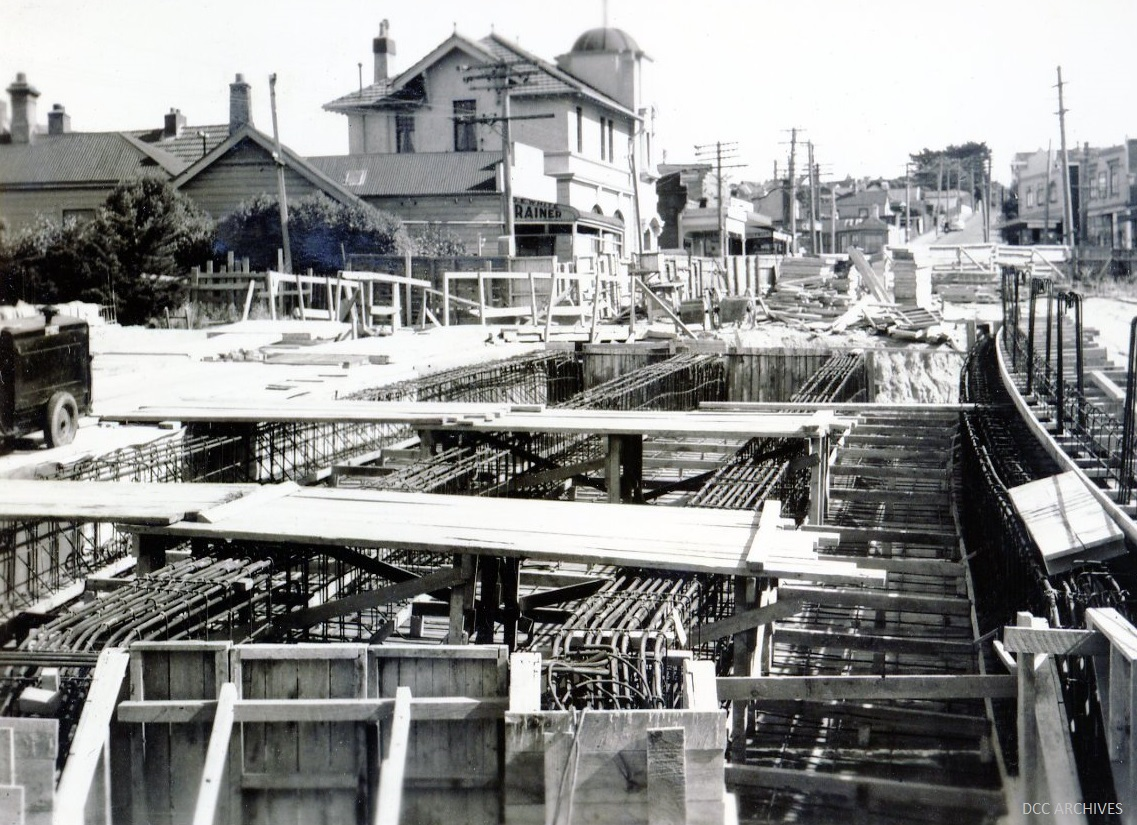
Construction of the overbridge in 1952, Roslyn Post Office in background

The bridge, constructed in 1954 consists of a single arch, and lies at the heart of one of the city's more complex interchanges. The suburb of Roslyn lies on and around Highgate on either side of the bridge, with its main shopping area being immediately to the south.

The bridge is visible from much of Dunedin. Views across the central city and Otago Harbour to Otago Peninsula can be gained from the bridge.
