= Environmental Performance Vehicles =

New Zealand bus manufacturing company

- Type: Portfolio company
- Industry: Bus manufacturing
- Founded: 1985 (as DesignLine); 2014 (EPV Corp.)
- Founders: John Turton (as DesignLine); Tony Luo (EPV Corp.)
- Headquarters: Charlotte, North Carolina, United States
- Area served: North America
- Owner: Wonderland Investment Group

Environmental Performance Vehicles (EPV), previously DesignLine Corporation, is a manufacturer of coach, electric and range-extended electric (hybrid) buses. It was founded in Ashburton, New Zealand in 1985. Initially it was a manufacturer of tour coaches. In the 1990s it diversified into conventional transit buses and then added hybrid city buses in the late 1990s. It was acquired by American interests in 2006, and DesignLine Corporation's headquarters was relocated to Charlotte, North Carolina. Following a bankruptcy in 2013, the assets of DesignLine were sold and the company was renamed.

EPV is no longer affiliated with the DesignLine operations in New Zealand, which was placed in liquidation in 2011 and then sold to a Malaysian-controlled joint business venture who operate it under the name DesignLine Bus Pacific, which was renamed Global Bus Ventures (NZ) on 30 May 2016.

== Bankruptcy ==
As DesignLine, it filed for protection under chapter 11 of the United States Bankruptcy Court in Delaware on August 15, 2013. The case was subsequently transferred to North Carolina. They employed over 250 people in the city of Charlotte.

Katie Goodman, Managing Partner of GGG Partners, LLC was retained as Chief Restructuring Officer of the corporation just prior to the filing.

On October 28, 2013, Wonderland Investment Group Inc. acquired most of the assets of DesignLine at an auction. Several key issues of the bankruptcy - including a class action suit for wrongful termination by DesignLine employees and the potential termination of a contract with the Denver Regional Transportation District - are set to be decided on January 14, 2014. Wonderland renamed the company EPV in January 2014.

== EcoSaver hybrid bus ==
One of the vehicles within EPV's fleet is the EcoSaver, a range-extended electric hybrid bus. The EcoSaver is plug-in sodium battery powered backed up by an on-board diesel or compressed natural gas (CNG) turbine engine. The bus is 100% emissions free. Unlike other hybrid buses, the on-board engine does not run vehicle systems as the battery depletes. Rather the turbine produces electricity that recharges the batteries. The turbines are supplied by Capstone Turbine of Chatsworth, California. This vehicle was first used from December 1998 in Christchurch, New Zealand, branded as The Shuttle.

The bus was originally designed as a response to the international tender for ecological buses to be used in the 2000 Sydney Olympics. This first-of-its-kind technology has been deployed in a number of fleets as the process has been tested and improved. Recent testing at the Bus Testing and Research Center at Penn State University show a substantial improvement in fuel economy over traditional buses. The EcoSaver will also be included as part of a national research effort coordinated by the National Renewable Energy Lab (NREL) to yield performance data on clean fuel vehicles.

The bus plugs in to recharge, and captures energy from regenerative braking technology. The bus does not need proprietary charging infrastructure. Simple industrial grade electrical access is all that is required. The buses can travel more than 100 miles between charges.

Numerous demonstration fleets of EcoSaver vehicles have been deployed worldwide since 1998. The DesignLine electric drive system has undergone several major development cycles, with the fourth generation North American system now in production.

The EcoSmart is in service internationally in Australia and Abu Dhabi UAE. The Société de Transport de Laval in Quebec, Canada is currently testing the EcoSmart for use in its fleet.

== Electric vehicle ==
DesignLine's EcoSmart is an all-electric bus powered by sodium batteries, and based on the established EcoSaver drive train system.

== Coach vehicle ==
DesignLine's EcoCoach is a high floor, single door bus powered by either compressed natural gas (CNG) or diesel fuel. The bus is built on a lightweight frame that lowers overall vehicle weight and improves fuel economy. The bus is designed for long routes with infrequent stops, such as intercity routes, or limited access transit routes (i.e. Park and Ride). DesignLine had a contract with New Jersey Transit to supply the agency with 76 EcoCoach buses by May 2013.

The EcoCoach is also the first 45-foot CNG coach to complete testing at the Altoona Bus Testing and Research Center.

== Products ==
DesignLine markets the following buses:

Model	Photo	Features
EcoSmart	DesignLine Electric Bus	All-electric vehicle.; Produced in 30, 35 and 42 foot versions.
EcoSaver	DesignLine REEV bus	On-board 65kW micro-turbine (powered by CNG or diesel) generator to recharge batteries.
EcoCoach	DesignLine EcoCoach bus	High floor, single door bus powered by either compressed natural gas (CNG) or diesel fuel.

== Usage ==
Currently, Designline/EPV buses are used in revenue service in five countries worldwide.

=== United States ===
Current operators

- New Jersey Transit on the 63, 64, 67, and 68 lines between Toms River, Lakewood, Freehold, Old Bridge, and Newark/Jersey City/Hoboken. Current fleet is retired due to Designline bankruptcy.
- RTD, Denver, CO - RTD currently operates two EcoSaver IV vehicles modified for the 16th Street Mall shuttle. An order for additional buses was cancelled due to the bankruptcy of DesignLine.

=== Canada ===
- Société de transport de Laval (1 unit)

=== New Zealand ===
- Auckland
  - NZ Bus
    - North Star
    - GO WEST
    - Metrolink
    - Waka Pacific
  - Birkenhead Transport
  - Ritchies
  - Howick and Eastern
  - SkyBus
  - Pavlovich Coachlines
  - Go Bus Transport
- Christchurch
  - Leopard Coachlines
  - Red Bus Ltd
  - Go Bus Christchurch
- Tauranga
  - Go Bus Transport
- Dunedin
  - Ritchies Transport
  - Passenger Transport Citibus
- Hamilton
- Hastings and Napier
- Palmerston North
- Wellington
  - GO Wellington
  - Valley Flyer

=== Australia ===
- Adelaide
- Mackay, Qld
- Melbourne

=== Other countries ===
- Tokyo, Japan
- Newcastle-upon-Tyne, United Kingdom
  - Stagecoach - one Olymbus diesel-electric bus was evaluated in 2004, this bus became one of ten Olymbus buses for QuayLink bus service in Newcastle-upon-Tyne and Gateshead and they were operated from 22 July 2005 until being replaced by Optare Versa from 10 August 2010. This was due to difficulty coping with hills on the route.
