= Public transport in Otago =

Orbus
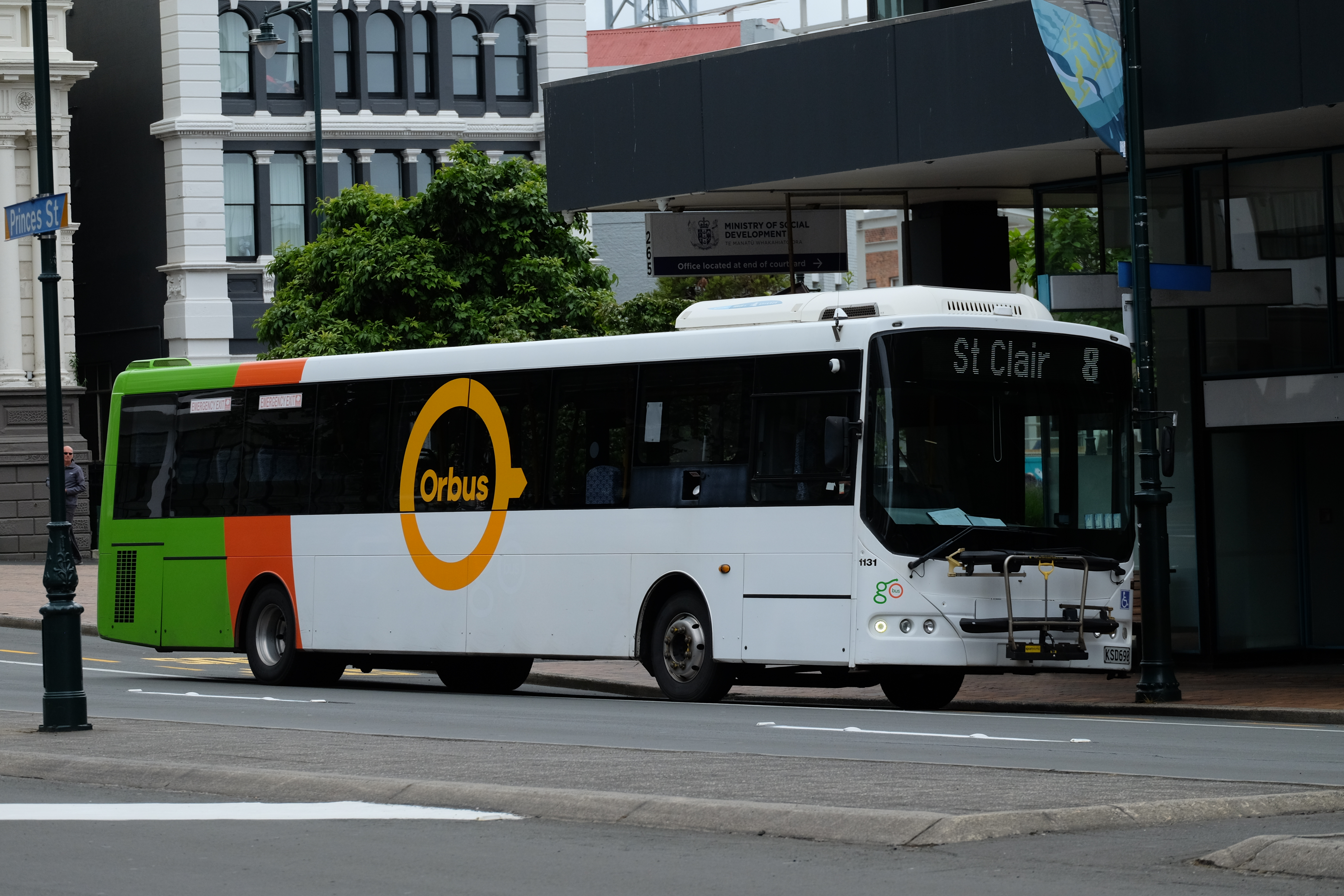
- Formerly: GoBus, Dunedin | Connectabus, Queenstown
- Parent: Otago Regional Council
- Founded: 2017
- Headquarters: Dunedin
- Locale: New Zealand
- Service area: Dunedin, Queenstown
- Service type: Bus, Ferries
- Routes: 20 in Dunedin, 6 in Queenstown
- Hubs: Dunedin Bus Hub, Great King St | Queenstown Bus Hub, Staney St and Frankton Bus Hub
- Fleet: 106 Vehicles
- Annual ridership: 5.59 million across Otago (July 2025 - June 2026)
- Fuel type: Diesel, battery electricity
- Operator: Go Bus Transport, Ritchies Transport

The public transport system of Otago centres around the areas of Dunedin and Queenstown, under the brand name Orbus. Public transport in the region is provided using buses and ferries. Despite sharing a name, the systems in Dunedin and Queenstown are isolated from one another.

The Otago Regional Council designs routes and schedules, and contracts operation of bus services to two bus companies, Go Bus Transport and Ritchies Transport. The majority of bus routes in Dunedin normally operate at 30 minute headways, with 8 and 63 operating at 15 minute frequencies. All buses in Queenstown run at 60 minute headways, except for route 1, which operates every 15 minutes. In Dunedin, Services on evenings, weekends and holidays operate at about half the normal weekday frequency and there are no services on late Sunday or holiday evenings, nor on Christmas Day, Good Friday or Easter Sunday. (Note: The Otago Heritage Bus Society operates special festive transport in Dunedin, including the traditional Suburban Rumbler.)

Bus fares in both cities are paid for by cash or by the electronic ticketing system Bee Card. The Bee Card replaced GoCards on 1 September 2020. Prior to GoCards, multi-trip paper tickets were used until November 2007.

Buses in Otago carried 4,050,282 passengers per year from 2022 to 2023.

Public transport passenger counts across Otago reached 5.59 million trips between July 2025 to June 2026, according to the Otago Regional Council.

== Dunedin bus routes ==
Most Dunedin bus routes are radial or cross-city services connecting suburbs with the Dunedin Bus Hub. Longer-distance routes include 1 to Palmerston and Ōamaru and 14 to Port Chalmers. Semi-orbital 15 Ridge Runner links inner and middle suburbs without serving the city centre. Mosgiel is served mainly by 77 and express 78, while the October 2026 changes replaced 70, 80 and 81 with 71, 72 and Orbus On Demand.

Route Number	Outer terminus	Key Stops	Dunedin Bus Hub Stops	Key Stops	Outer terminus	Bus operator
1	Oamaru via Palmerston	Waikouaiti, Karitane, Warrington, Waitati, Botanic Gardens	City to Oamaru - E (North) Oamaru to City - H (South)	–	–	Go Bus
5	Pine Hill	Botanic Gardens, Woodhaugh Gardens, George Street, Knox Church, Dunedin Hospital	North - E South - J	The Exchange, Caversham	Calton Hill	Ritchies
8	Normanby	North East Valley, Botanic Gardens, Woodhaugh Gardens, George Street, Knox Church, Dunedin Hospital	North - D South - I	The Exchange, South Dunedin	St Clair	Go Bus
10	Opoho	Botanic Gardens, Woodhaugh Gardens, George Street, Knox Church, Dunedin Hospital	North - E South - J	The Exchange, South Dunedin, Musselburgh	Shiel Hill	Ritchies
14	Port Chalmers	Careys Bay, St Leonards, Ravensbourne, Logan Park, Forsyth Barr Stadium, University, Otago Museum	City to Port Chalmers - B (North) Port Chalmers to City - G (South)	–	-	Go Bus
15 Ridge Runner	Logan Park	Forsyth Barr Stadium, University, Otago Museum, Woodhaugh Gardens, Botanic Gardens, Roslyn, Maori Hill, Mornington	–	–	South Dunedin	Ritchies
18	Portobello via Harington Point	Company Bay, Macandrew Bay, Edgar Centre, South Dunedin, Exchange	City to Portobello - G (South) Portobello to City - C (North)	–	–	Go bus
19	Belleknowes	Roslyn, Moana Pool	North - E South - J	The Exchange, South Dunedin, Musselburgh	Waverley	Go Bus
30	Helensburgh	Wakari, Dunedin Hospital	North - C South - H	The Exchange, South Dunedin, Tainui/Tahuna	Ocean Grove	Go Bus
33	Wakari	Roslyn, Moana Pool	North - C South - H	The Exchange, South Dunedin, Caversham	Corstorphine	Go Bus
35	Ross Creek	Ross Creek Reservoir, Woodhaugh Gardens, George Street, Knox Church, Dunedin Hospital	North - C South - H	The Exchange, South Dunedin, Caversham	St Clair Park	Go Bus
37	Concord	Kaikorai Valley, Roslyn, Moana Pool	North - A South - F	Otago Museum, University	Logan Park	Go Bus
44	Halfway Bush	Kaikorai, Roslyn, Moana Pool	North - D South - I	The Exchange, South Dunedin	St Kilda	Go Bus
55	Brockville	Glenross, Kaikorai, Roslyn, Moana Pool	North - D South - I	The Exchange, South Dunedin	St Kilda	Go Bus
61	Kenmure	Mornington, City Rise, The Exchange	City to Kenmure - A (South) Kenmure to City - F (North)	–	–	Go Bus
63	Balaclava	Maryhill, Mornington, City Rise, The Exchange	North - A South - F	Dunedin Hospital, Otago Museum, University	Logan Park	Go Bus
71/72	Brighton	Ocean View, Waldronville, Green Island	–	–		Go Bus
71/72	Abbotsford (Loop)	Green Island, Kaikorai Valley, Roslyn, Moana Pool	City to Abbotsford - D (North) Abbotsford to City - I (South)	–		Go Bus
77/78	Mosgiel	Gordon Road Clocktower, Fairfield, Green Island, Caversham, South Dunedin, The Exchange	City to Mosgiel - F (North) Mosgiel to City - F (South)	–	–	Go Bus
77/78	Mosgiel (Express)	Gordon Road Clocktower, The Exchange	City to Mosgiel - F (North) Mosgiel to City - F (South)	–	–	Go Bus
Mosgiel On-Demand	Mosgiel	Mosgiel, Wingatui, East Taieri, Kinmont Park	–	–	–	Go Bus

=== Dunedin school bus routes ===
Route Number	Outer terminus	School Stops	Dunedin Bus Hub Stops (Northbound/Southbound)	Bus Operator
1	Oamaru	Waitaki Girls' Warrington School	City to Oamaru - E (North) Oamaru to City - H (South)	Go Bus
18	Portobello via Harington Point	Bayfield High School	City to Portobello via Harington Point - G (North) Portobello via Harington Point to City - C (South)	Go Bus
95/96	Pine Hill via Opoho	Logan Park High School	–	Ritches
95/96	Pine Hill	Dunedin North Intermediate	–	Ritches

== Queenstown bus routes ==
Queenstown's bus network provides public transport between Queenstown's town centre, surrounding suburbs, residential areas, and tourist destinations. Most routes operate through the Queenstown central area with services extending to Frankton, Arrowtown, Kelvin Heights, Jack's Point, Arthurs Point, and Lake Hayes. The network also provides connections to Queenstown Airport and key shopping and employment areas.

Route Number	Outer stop (East)	Key stops	Outer stop (West)	Bus Operator
1	Remarkables Shops	Frankton Hub, Airport, Queenstown CBD, Fernhill	Sunshine Bay	Ritches
2	Arrowtown	Amisfield Winery, Mora Wines	Frankton	Ritches
3	Quail Rise	Frankton Hub, Remarkables Park	Kelvin Heights	Ritches
4	Arrowtown	Arthurs Point, Queenstown CBD, Frankton Hub, Hanley's Farm	Jack's Point	Ritches
5	Queenstown	Queenstown CBD, Frankton Hub, Shotover Country	Lake Hayes	Ritches

=== Queenstown school bus routes ===
Route Number	Outer Stop	School Stops	Bus Operator
1	Sunshine Bay	Wakatipu High School	Ritches
2	Arrowtown	Arrowtown Primary School	Ritches
4	Jack's Point via Arrowtown	Wakatipu High School	Ritches

=== Queenstown ferry ===
Orbus Ferries Queenstown is a scheduled ferry service operating daily between Queenstown Bay and Frankton Marina. Stopping at the Hilton and Bayview.

Route	1st stop	2nd stop	3rd stop	4th stop
6	Queenstown Bay	Bayview	Marina Heights	Hilton

- All routes use wheelchair-accessible buses
- All routes use buses fitted with bike racks

== Bus Fares ==
Bus Fares in Queenstown and Dunedin are based on the passenger's age and concession status. Most passengers use a Bee Card, with standard fares of $2.50 for adults and $1.50 for children aged 5–12 and youths aged 13–18. Passengers with a Community Services Card can use the Community Connect concession, reducing the adult fare to $1.25. Children under five travel free, while SuperGold cardholders travel free during off-peak periods. Cash fares are $4 for adults, children and youths. Bee Card users can transfer between buses for free when the second bus is boarded within 45 minutes of tagging off the first bus. Bus services to and from Queenstown Airport have separate fares.

=== Ferry Fare ===
The Queenstown Ferry fare is $10 one-way with a Bee Card while it'll cost $14 without a Bee Card.

== Beecard transition to Motu Move ==
Motu Move launched in Greater Christchurch in November 2025, with contactless payment options on bus and ferry services in Christchurch City, Selwyn and Waimakariri. Rollout is continuing across New Zealand region by region. Motu Move is expected to be operational throughout the country by the end of 2027.

With Motu Move, you will be able to:

- pay with contactless debit/credit card or device
- use a prepaid Motu Move card
- or pre-buy a ticket.

== Organising bus routes in Dunedin ==
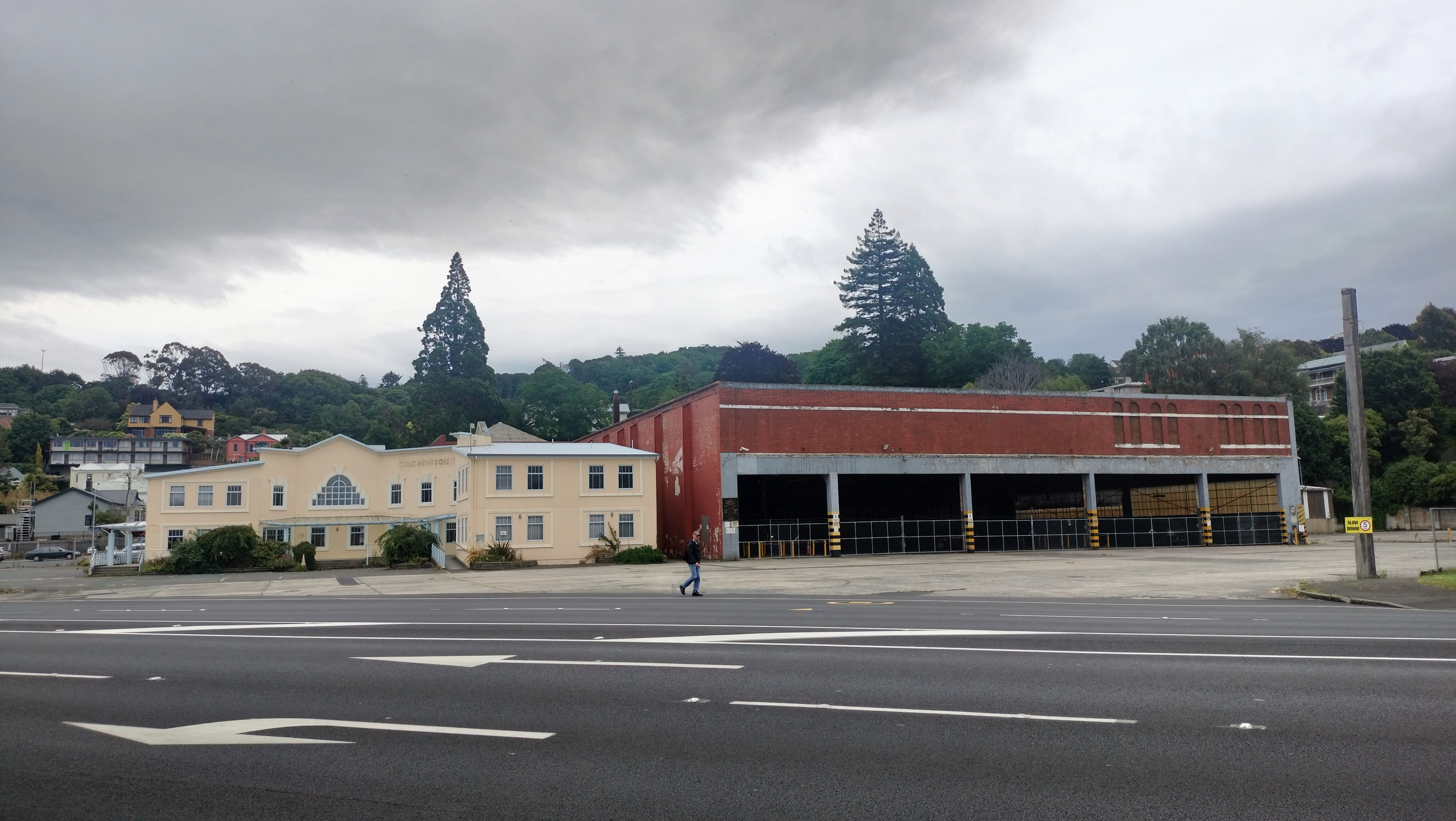
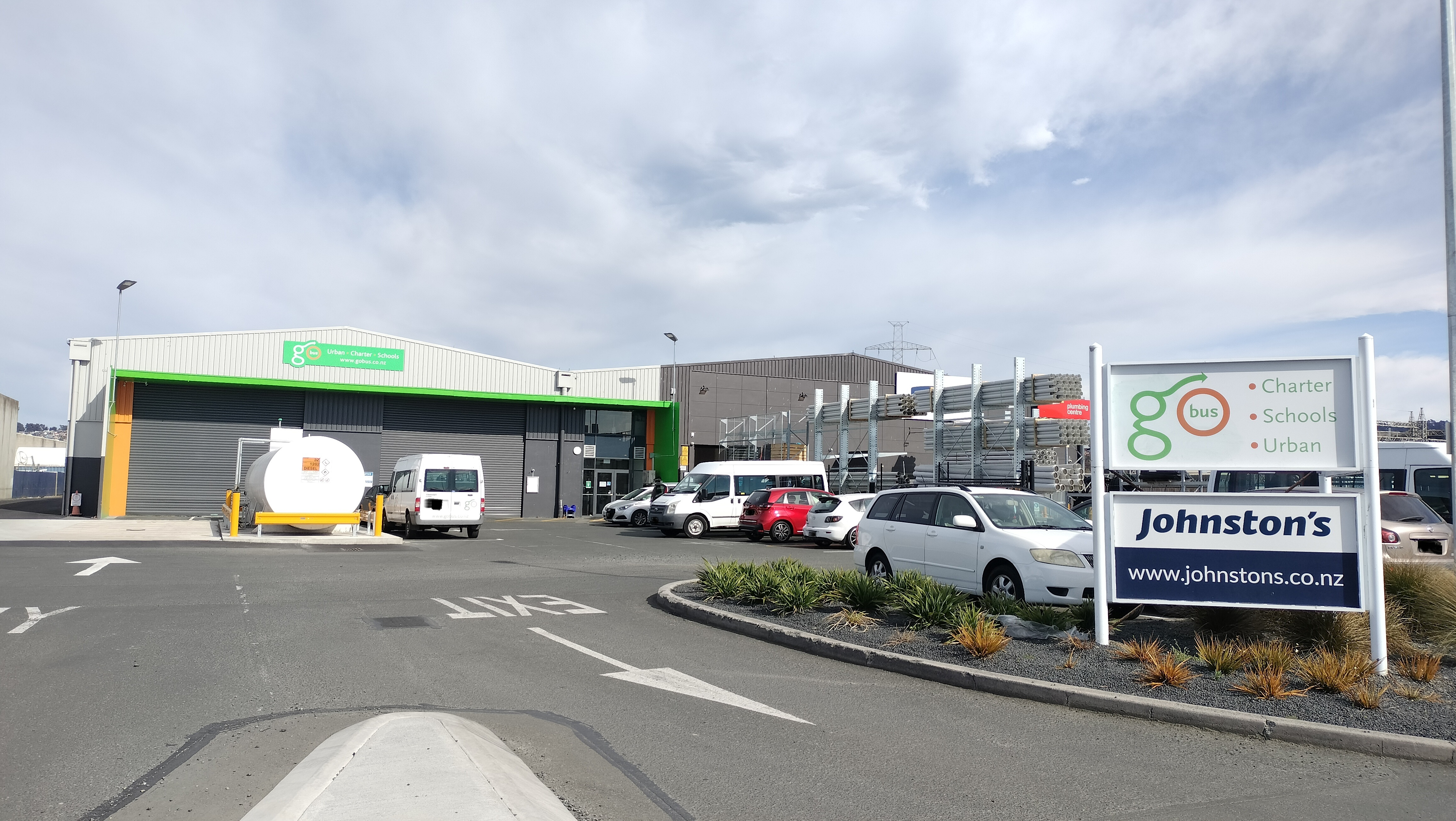
The former Dunedin bus depot on Princes Street and the new bus depot on Portsmouth Drive.

Dunedin's bus network is designed and managed by the Otago Regional Council. Fares are levied to cover about half of operating cost with the balance subsidised by Otago Regional Council ratepayers (about a quarter) and New Zealand Transport Agency (the remaining quarter; funded by fuel tax and road user charges). Buses use the individual companies' livery with Otago Regional Council stickers added. Until 2015, all services operated under the brand Gobus; this ended when a bus company with a similar name began serving the city. The regional council intends to introduce a new brand Orbus to the network Safety standards are regulated by the NZ Transport Agency (NZTA). The Dunedin City Council has no administrative role other than as provider of the road infrastructure (with the exception of State Highways, for which NZTA is the provider), street furniture such as signs and seats and regulation of parking at bus stops. However, the city council is involved in discussions with the regional council over taking over the management of public transport.

In July 2023, the Otago Daily Times reported that the Go Bus Transport company would be shifting its bus depot from Princes Street to the former PlaceMakers site on Portsmouth Drive in early 2024. Earlier in July 2022, the Dunedin City Council had explored selling the Princes Street bus depot to enable Kāinga Ora to develop housing. In response, Dunedin Tramways Union branch president Alan Savell had defended retaining the bus depot at Princes Street. In late July 2024, the Otago Daily Times reported that Kāinga Ora had abandoned plans to build an 80-100 room apartment block on the site of the Princes Street bus depot after discovering it sat on contaminated ground.

In mid August 2025, GoBus opened its new Dunedin depot at the former PlaceMakers site on Portsmouth Drive, which replaced the Princes Street site. The new depot consists of a workshop capable of servicing six buses, a 50,000-litre diesel fuel tank, refuelling area, a purpose-built bush wash facility and a portable charger for GoBus's fleet of 13 new electric buses. By early September 2025, GoBus had finished relocating its operations from Princes Street to Portsmouth Drive. The Dunedin City Council indicated that it was exploring options for redeveloping the Princes Street site.

== History of public transport in Otago ==
The Dunedin City Council operated and managed most public transport until 1986 including the Dunedin cable tramway system (similar to the famous San Francisco cable car system) between 1881 and 1957, electric trams from 1900 to 1956, trolleybuses from 1950 to 1982 and motor buses from 22 April 1925 to 1986. From 1986, management of bus services became the responsibility of the Otago Regional Council. Otago Regional Council allowed any company to bid on routes and services, and Citibus, the city council owned bus company, won many of the routes tendered and had the best quality vehicles, compared to the private operators.

Citibus would go on to be privatised in 2011, after Dunedin City Council voted to sell it, with the mayor at the time summarising by saying that it was "hemorrhaging money". There was concern by some critics, like Labour MP Clare Curran, that this move would worsen driver working conditions.

New Zealand Railways (NZR) operated commuter trains from the Dunedin railway station to Port Chalmers and to Wingatui and Mosgiel until 1979 and 1982, respectively. Reintroduction of rail services is suggested from time to time. NZR, through its Road Services division, from 1985 known as Cityline, also operated motor buses to the suburbs of Warrington, Cherry Farm, Brighton, Outram and Mosgiel until Cityline was privatised in 1991 – the Dunedin fleet was sold to Newtons Coachways. All the above-mentioned train or bus routes except Warrington and Outram continue to be served by the present bus system.

In early times, there were ferries connecting the central city to Port Chalmers and Portobello, but these ceased between the 1930s and 2018 as road connections along the harbour's edge were improved.

Former privately owned public transport operators in Dunedin included Turnbulls (Dunedin to Portobello); Newtons (Dunedin to Waverley), Otago Road Services (Dunedin to Green Island, Abbotsford and Fairfield), all of whom operated services over several decades from the 1950s to the 1980s and 1990s. From the late 1980s onwards, Cesta Travel (later called Southeastern) and Dunedin Passenger Transport operated a wide range of routes on various short-term contracts.

In late January 2020, the Dunedin City Council voted to reduce bus fares while exploring the re-establishment of a commuter rail link between Mosgiel and the Dunedin city centre. This includes allocating $600,000 to bus subsidies.

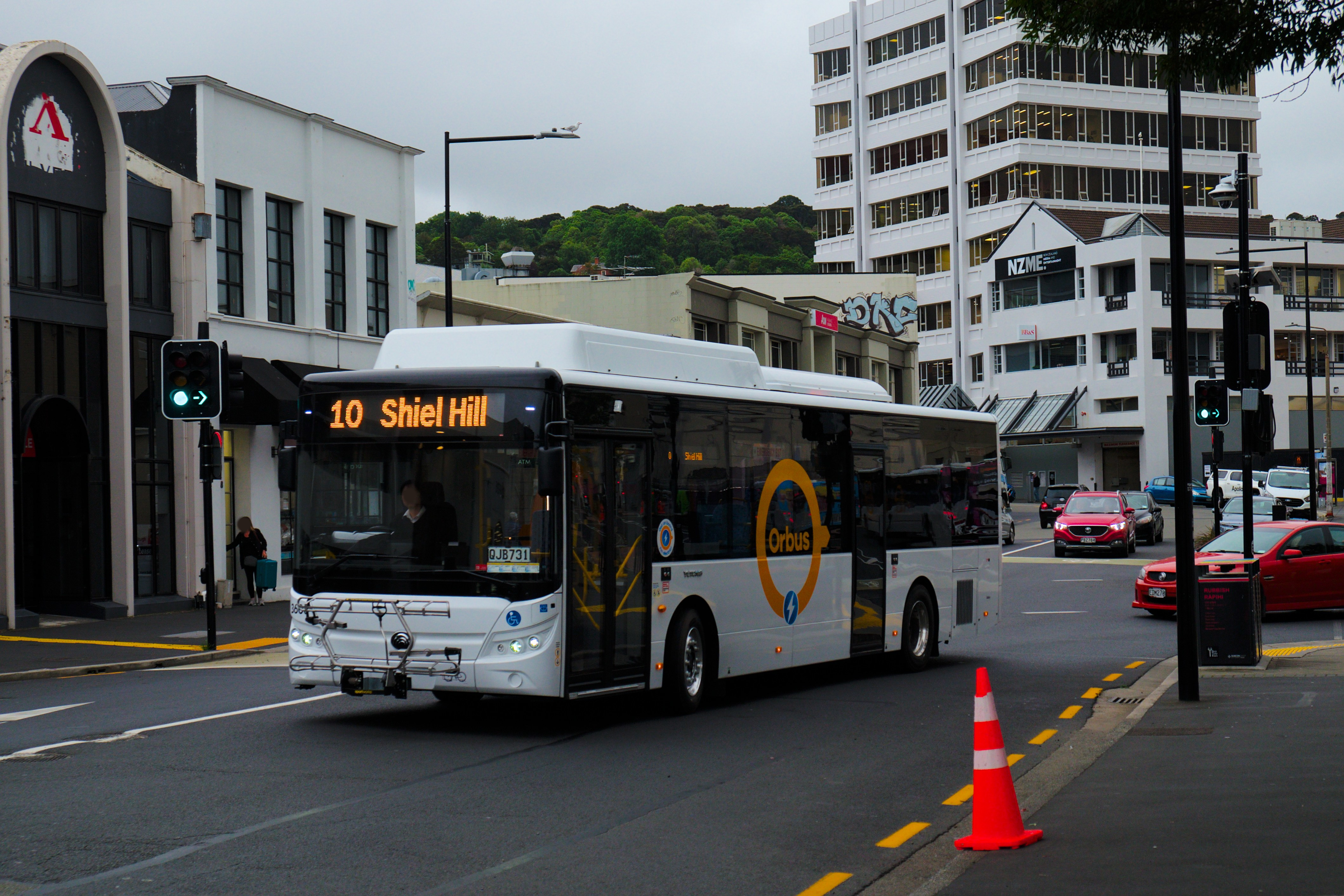
Ritchies Orbus Yutong E10 battery electric bus leaves the Bus Hub

In early February 2024, Ritchies introduced 11 Yutong E10 battery electric buses to its fleet in Dunedin, which were originally planned to enter service in October 2023. Each bus cost between $500,000 and $700 000, and operate on some of the city's steepest routes. There was initially slight concern about how much charging the buses would need, but this concern was eliminated when the buses proved to be able to run all day on a single charge, although Ritchie's says it can charge them midday if needed. Prior to this, for the month of October in 2021 Otago Regional Council trialled an electric bus in Dunedin, to test its abilities on steep terrain and on the motorway.

From October 2026, There are 37 new electric buses which means 77% of buses are now electric. Dunedin buses are planned to be all electric by 2028

== Airport buses ==
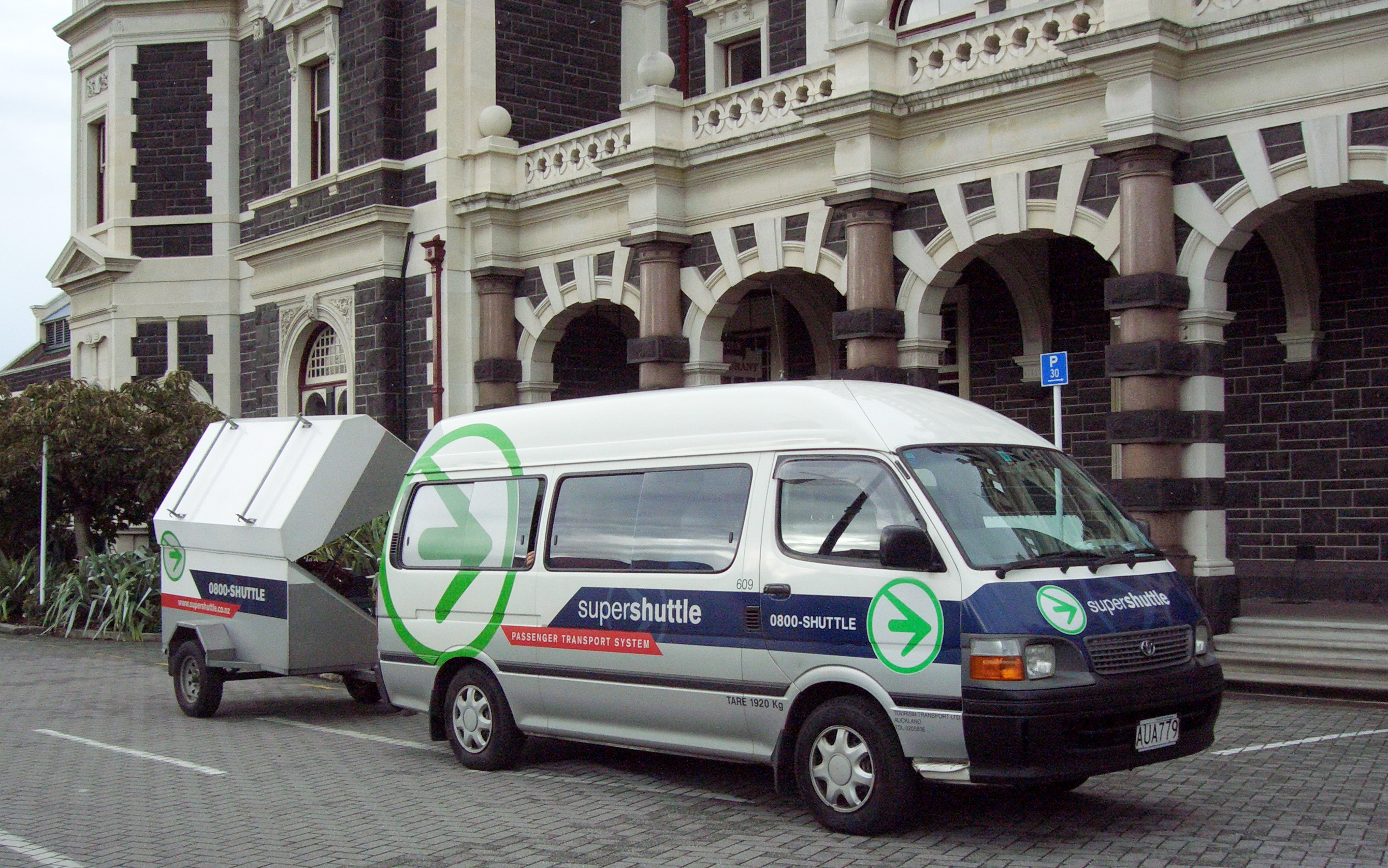
A shuttle van to Dunedin Airport loads a passenger at Dunedin railway station

There are no conventional airport bus services to Dunedin Airport: this airport is served by a large fleet of shuttle vans provided by several operators including most of the local taxi companies. Airport shuttle vans typically stop several times en route to pick up or let off booked passengers.

Orbus runs bus route 1 to Queenstown Airport from other parts of Queenstown.

== See Also ==
- Trams in Dunedin
- Cable Trams in Dunedin
- Trolleybuses in Dunedin
