= Go Bus Christchurch =

New Zealand bus operator

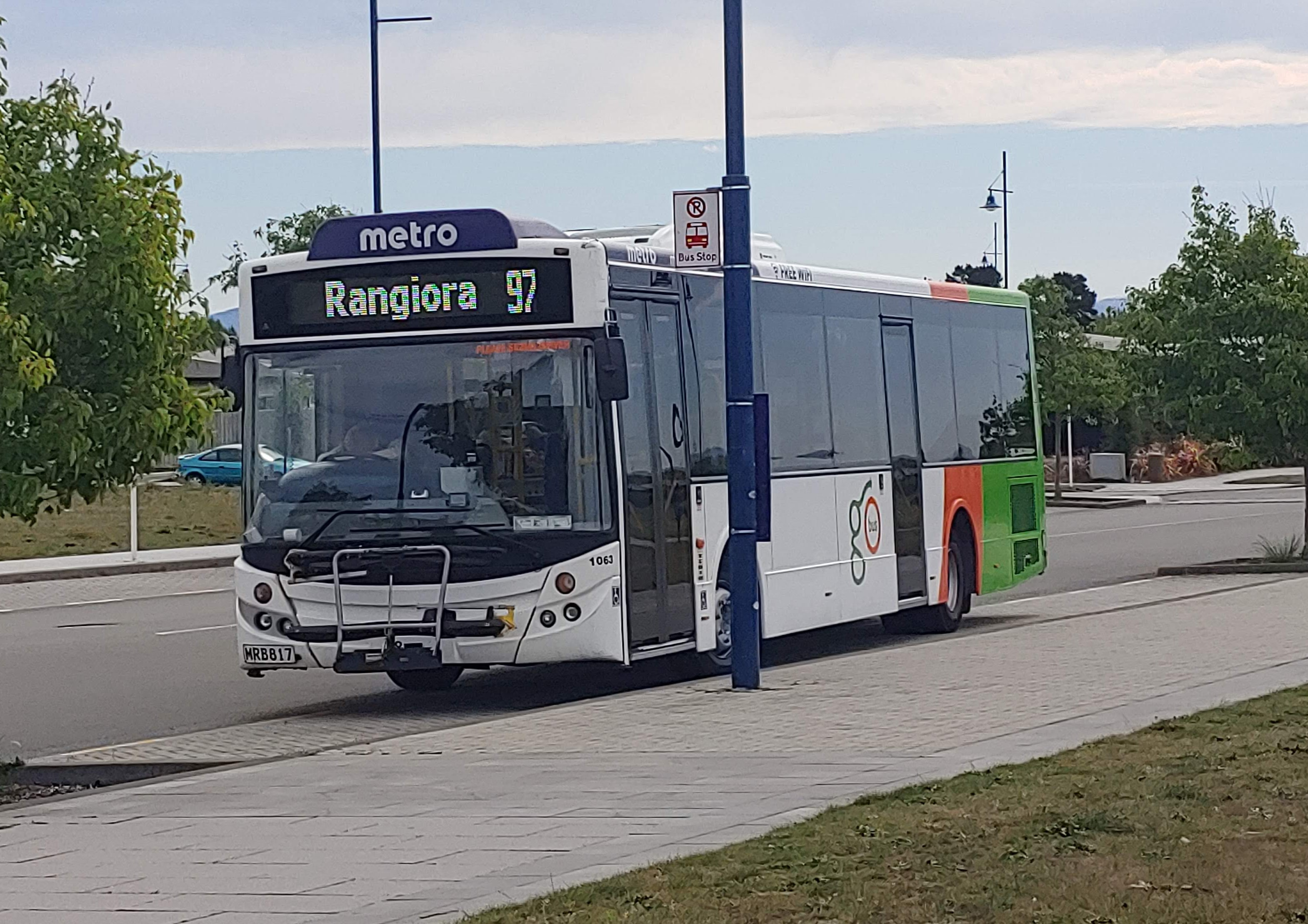
- Founded: 1 December 2010
- Headquarters: Middleton, Christchurch
- Locale: New Zealand
- Service area: Christchurch, New Zealand
- Service type: Bus service
- Routes: 1, 5, 7, 27, 44, 60, 80, 85, 95, 100, 107, 120, 125, 130, 135, 820 and The Orbiter
- Destinations: Belfast, Rangiora, Princess Margaret Hospital, Cashmere, Dallington, Hillmorton, Aidanfield, Southshore, Lincoln, Parklands, Waikuku, Pegasus, Redwood, Westlake, Christchurch Airport, Hei Hei, Hornby, Avonhead, The Palms, Kaiapoi, Burnham, Rolleston, New Brighton
- Hubs: Christchurch Bus Interchange
- Fleet: MAN (Designline), Volvo B7RLE (Designline), MAN (Kiwi Bus Builders), Yutong Electric, GBV Electric
- Fuel type: Diesel
- Operator: Kinetic Group
- Website: Go Bus Christchurch

Go Bus Christchurch Ltd. is a bus company owned by Go Bus Transport Ltd. The company started off as Christchurch Bus Services Ltd in 2004.

In November 2010, it was sold to Go Bus Ltd after it was found that Christchurch Bus Services had failed to maintain vehicles and put commuters in danger.

== Routes ==
Go Bus Christchurch operate all routes previously operated by Christchurch Bus Services under the Metro brand:

#	Route	Origin	Via	Destination
1	Rangiora and Cashmere	Princess Margaret Hospital & Cashmere	via City	Belfast & Rangiora
7	Halswell and Queenspark	Halswell	via City	Queenspark
5	Rolleston and New Brighton	New Brighton	via City	Hornby & Rolleston
44	Shirley & Dallington	City	Shirley	Dallington
60	Hillmorton/Southshore	Hillmorton	via Barrington	Southshore
80	Lincoln/Parklands	Lincoln	via City	Parklands
95	ARA	City	Pegasus	Waikuku
130	Hei Hei/Avonhead	Hei Hei	via Hornby & Westfield Riccarton	Avonhead

== History ==
=== Christchurch Bus Services ===
Christchurch Bus Services Ltd operated Metro routes for Environment Canterbury, and private charter services for groups and schools. It was purchased in December 2010 by Go Bus Transport, of Hamilton, New Zealand.

=== Timaru operations ===
Christchurch Bus Services previously operated in Timaru, South Canterbury through its subsidiary Timaru Bus Services, before terminating the contract with 18 months left, due to financial issues. Ritchies Transport gained the five Timaru routes.

=== Operation Otautahi Waka ===
Operation Otautahi Waka ('Christchurch transport') was a commercial vehicle check on buses conducted by the New Zealand Police on 18 November 2010. Christchurch Bus Services Ltd had four buses ordered off the road, which resulted in it being unable to operate a number of routes. These buses returned to duty the following day after repairs. Redbus and Leopard also had buses ordered off the road. Environment Canterbury gave Christchurch Bus Services until 5pm, 19 November 2010 to complete sale negotiations or lose their contracts for a number of routes. After CBS was sold, it was ruled an illegal action on the part of Environment Canterbury by the Courts and CBS owners received the money owed.

=== Purchase of Leopard urban bus ===
In July 2013 Gobus Transport took over the urban operations of Leopard Coachlines, gaining around 90 buses.
