= Ritchies Transport =

Public transport operator in New Zealand

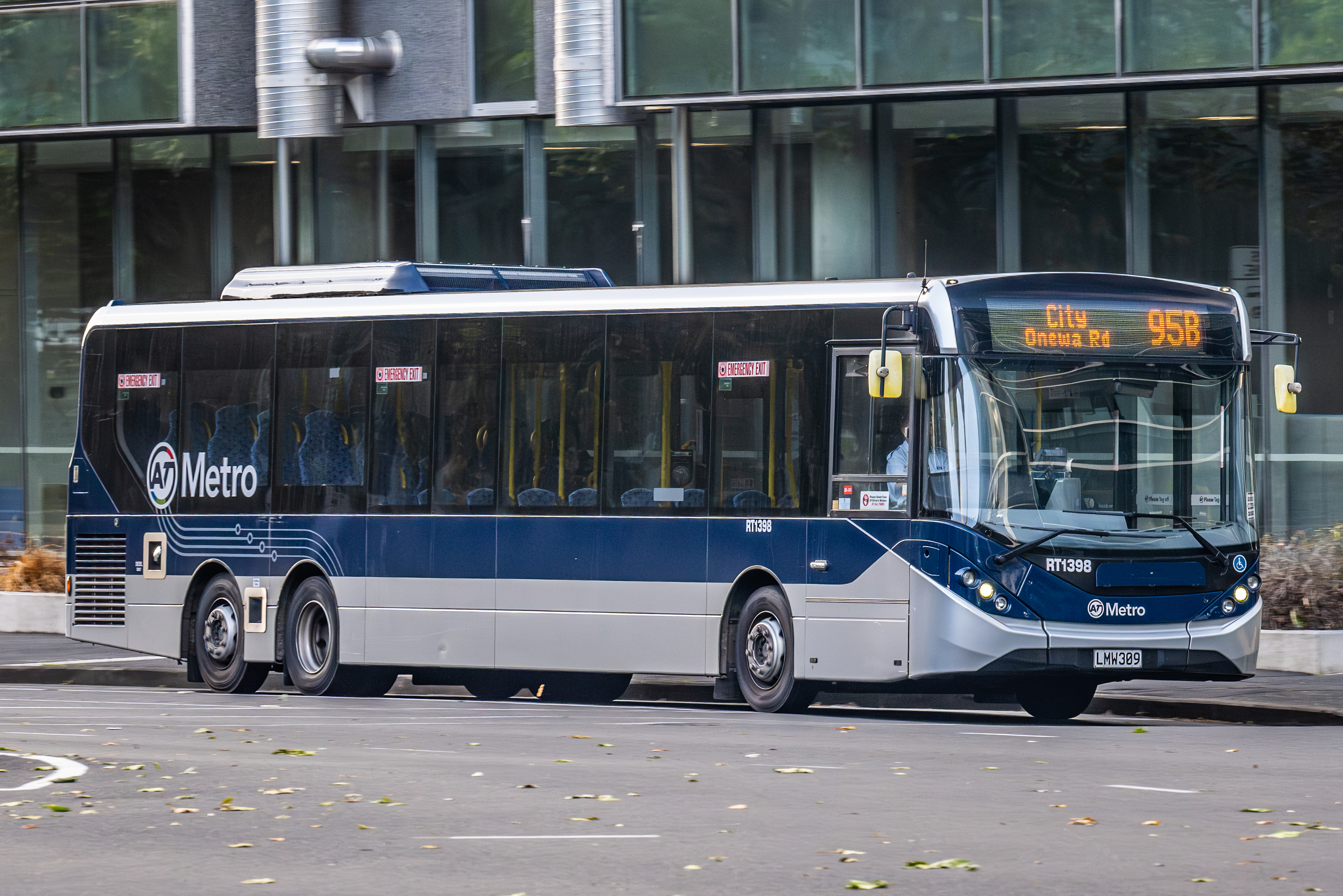
- Ritchies Transport Alexander Dennis Enviro200XLB in AT Metro livery
- Parent: Kohlberg Kravis Roberts
- Founded: 1972; 54 years ago
- Headquarters: Auckland, New Zealand
- Locale: New Zealand
- Service area: New Zealand
- Fleet: 1700+
- Website: www.ritchies.co.nz

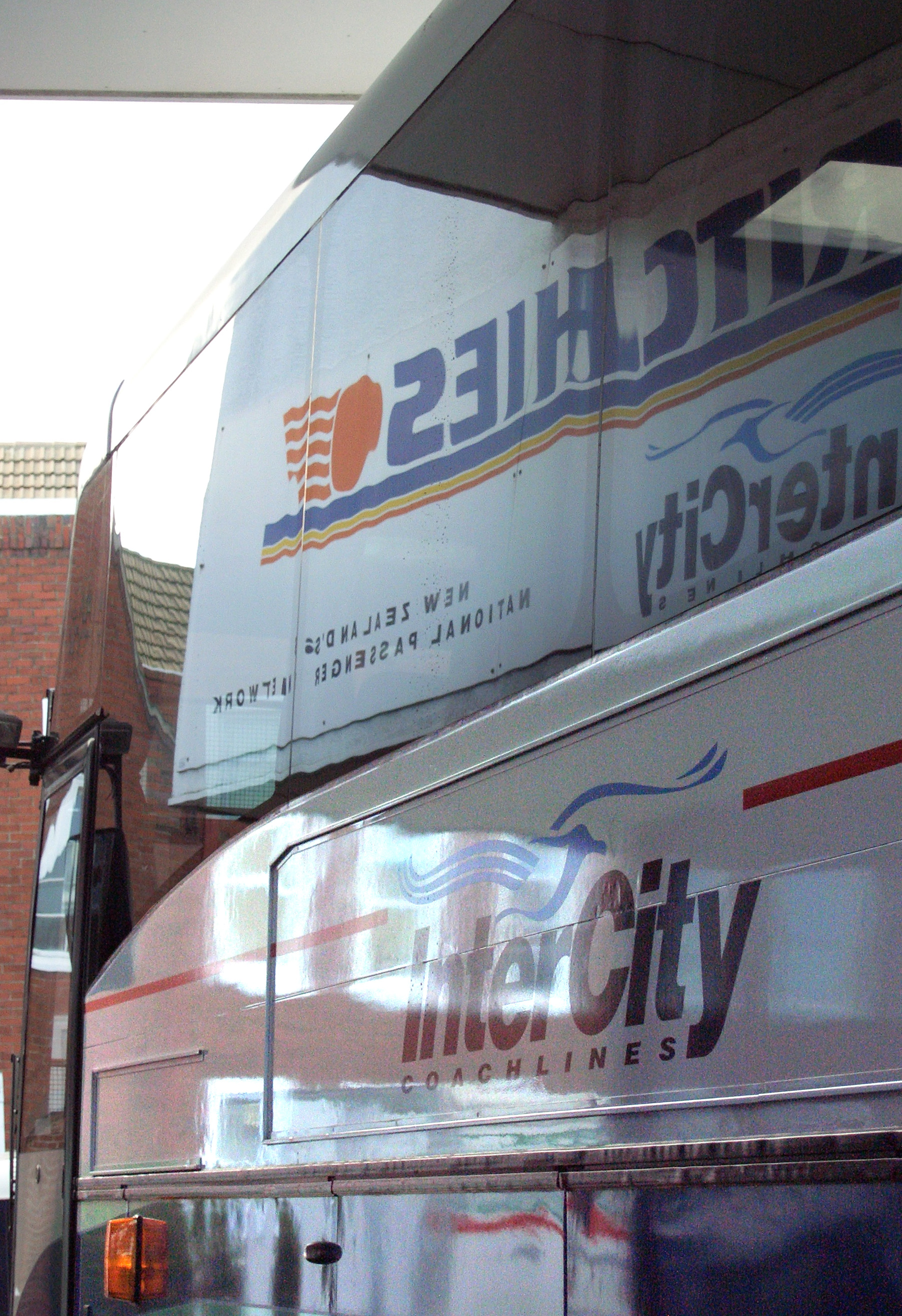
Ritchies is a significant shareholder in InterCity

Ritchies Transport is a New Zealand private bus operator, owned by KKR. It was established in 1972 and describes itself as "the largest privately owned bus and coach transport operator in New Zealand" with a fleet of over 1700 vehicles spread across depots nationwide. It also owns a 46% stake in InterCity.

== History ==
Richies Coachlines was founded in Temuka in 1937. John Ritchie ran the company from 1970. Still actively involved, he died in July 2010.

In 2014 they invested $18m in a new West Auckland bus depot with 132 buses.

On 8 May 2019, Ritchies Transport acquired Birkenhead Transport, taking over bus operations on 13 May.

On 24 April 2025, Ritchies Transport acquired Pavlovich Coachlines, taking over bus operations on the same day.

== Services ==
Ritchies operates coach services for several package tour operators, as well as urban services, usually under contract to local councils:

- Auckland: Ritchies' main urban bus operations are in Auckland, operating out of depots in Swanson and Albany servicing West Auckland including Helensville and the North Shore. Ritchies also operates high-speed Northern Express NX1 services on the Northern Busway on Auckland's North Shore, under contract to Auckland Transport. In 2025it was announced that Ritchies would be taking over the Mangere Otahuhu South Auckland bus contract (including Routes AIR, 31, 32, 36, 38, 309, 309X 313, 314, 324, 325 and 326) off of the previous operator, Kinetic group's GoBus brand. Part of the contract included a new 311 and 327 route, and the removal of the Night Bus service N10. These new contracts commenced on Sunday 2nd November 2025 (02/11/2025). Ritchies also operates their own Skydrive service as an Airport - City Center shuttle which is not associated with Auckland Transport.
- Blenheim: Ritchies operate the local bus service in Blenheim under contract to the Marlborough District Council. There are two loops that service the town.
- Christchurch: With deregulation of bus services Ritchies entered the Christchurch urban market with a number of routes using various buses purchased from other companies, including the Auckland Regional Authority, Invercargill City Transport, Timaru City Transport and New Plymouth City Buses. In January 1997, Ritchies sold its Christchurch urban contracts to Christchurch Transport Ltd but retained ownership of the buses. It was announced on 4 November that Ritchies has purchased the assets of Red Bus Ltd for an undisclosed sum. Red Bus operates a number of urban services from the airport area to the south east of the city.
- Dunedin: Ritchies amalgamated Dunedin bus lines Turnbull Motors, Peninsula Motor Services and Southern Services in 1975. Since then, Ritchies has operated urban services in Dunedin from time to time. From 1 July 2011, it has operated the Opoho–Shiel Hill, Pine Hill–Lookout Point, and University–Concord routes.
- Queenstown: In 2016, Ritchies took over Connectabus, Queenstown's privately owned public transport service and continues to run the services. In 2017, Ritchies bought out Alpine Connexions in Wānaka, integrating their Queenstown–Wānaka services into its own.
- Timaru and Temuka: Ritchies was founded in this small South Canterbury city. They have operated four Timaru urban bus routes contracted to Metro since 28 June 2010, previously operated by Christchurch Bus Services. They also run the Timaru–Temuka bus route.

== Incidents ==
On Christmas Eve 2016, a Ritchies coach crashed on a route from Auckland to Gisborne. Three passengers died and the driver and other passengers were injured. The resulting prosecution by Worksafe NZ resulted in Ritchies paying a $210,000 fine and $750,000 in reparation to the victims.

== See also ==
- Public transport in New Zealand
- Public transport in Auckland
- Public transport in Christchurch
- Public transport in the Otago Region
- Public transport in Invercargill
- Public transport in Wellington
