= Bee Card (New Zealand) =

Public transport smartcard ticketing system in New Zealand

- Bee Card
- Location: Bay of Plenty, Gisborne, Hawkes Bay, Invercargill, Nelson, Northland, Otago, Taranaki, Waikato, Manawatū–Whanganui
- Launched: November 2019; 7 years ago
- Technology: MiFare DESFire EV1
- Manager: Bee Card Regional Consortium
- Currency: NZD ($299 maximum load)
- Stored-value: Pay as you go
- Auto recharge: Auto Top Up (available for registered cards)
- Validity: Buses in 10 regions of New Zealand; Te Huia; Queenstown Ferries
- Retailed: Online; Retail outlets; Onboard Te Huia
- Website: beecard.co.nz

Regions of New Zealand that fully or partially support the use of the Bee Card on buses.

The Bee Card is an electronic fare payment smart card that is used on bus services in ten regions of New Zealand, along with Queenstown Ferries and the Te Huia train service between Hamilton (Waikato) and Auckland. It is used as a tag-on tag-off card on buses, with paper tickets remaining available for use for each of the individual region's public transport network systems.

First launched in late 2019 in Northland, it has since expanded to regions including Manawatū–Whanganui, Invercargill, Waikato, Bay of Plenty, Nelson, Hawke's Bay and Otago with Taranaki switching to the Bee Card in late 2020, ending the main rollout. Gisborne's GizzyBus was added to the system in 2022, along with Queenstown Ferries. It also replaced the separate pre-existing fare card systems that were used by individual regional councils such as the BUSIT card (Waikato) and the GoCard (Otago).

The Bee Card will be replaced by a national ticket system called Motu Move over a two-year period commencing 2025.

== Background ==
The National Ticketing Solution (NTS) is a proposed nationwide electronic public transport ticketing system, expected to be implemented by 2026. The Bee Card is an interim ticketing system to be used until the implementation of the nationwide system.

In 2013, nine regional councils formed a “Regional Consortium” to represent their interests in public transport matters, which led to the creation of the Bee Card.

In January 2025, the Otago Regional Council confirmed that Bee Cards would be phased out nationwide over a period of two years in favour of a national ticketing system called Motu Move. Motu Move is a partnership between the NZ Transport Agency Waka Kotahi and 13 public transport authorities.

== Regional history ==
The card was gradually rolled out across ten regions of New Zealand from 2019 to 2022.

=== Northland ===
Whangārei was the first city to use Bee Card, starting on 20 November 2019.

=== Manawatū–Whanganui ===
Whanganui was the second city to use Bee Card, starting on 9 December 2019.

Other places in the Manawatū–Whanganui region (i.e. Palmerston North, Ashhurst, Feilding, Levin, and Marton) switched to the system between December 2019 and July 2020, as it was delayed over teething problems.

=== Southland ===
Invercargill replaced its Bus Smart card with Bee Card on 22 June 2020.

=== Waikato ===
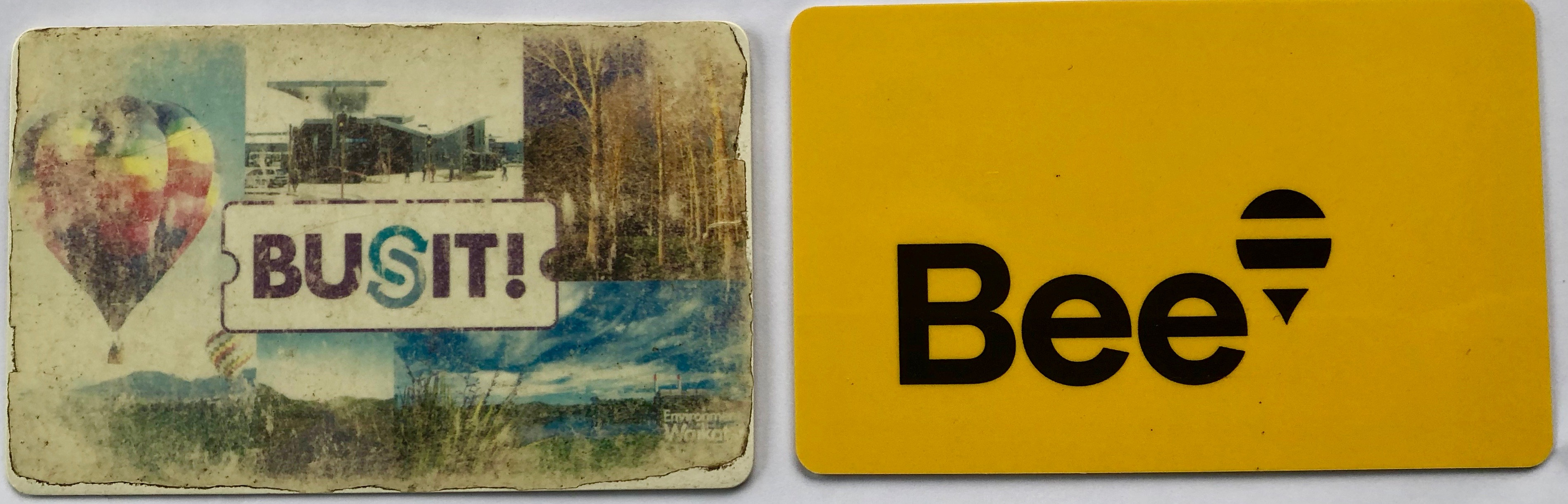
Bee Cards (right) replaced BUSIT cards (left) in Waikato on 1 July 2020

Waikato replaced its BUSIT card with Bee Card on 6 July 2020.

The Te Huia train accepted the Bee Card from its first service on 6 April 2021.

=== Bay of Plenty ===
Bee Card was introduced to Katikati, Kawerau, Omokoroa, Ōpōtiki, Rotorua and Whakatāne on 20 July and to Tauranga on 27 July 2020, replacing both the Tauranga and Rotorua Smartride cards.

=== Nelson ===
Nelson's replaced its NBus Card with Bee Card on 3 August 2020.

=== Hawke's Bay ===
Hawke's Bay replaced its goBay cards with Bee Card on 24 August 2020.

=== Otago ===
Dunedin transitioned from the GoCard to the Bee Card during 2020. During the transition period, all trips were free. Bee Card became available in Dunedin on 1 September 2020 and in Queenstown on 15 September 2020.

The Bee Card led to increased bus passenger numbers in Dunedin due to its cheaper fares and simplified fare structure that was not zone-based.

Bee Card was added to Otago's Queenstown Ferries on 26 October 2022.

=== Taranaki ===
Taranaki replaced its Citylink and Connector cards with the Bee Card on 19 October 2020. With cheaper fares and an easier payment method, the Bee Card led to increased bus trips on Taranaki's Waitara route.

=== Gisborne ===
The GizzyBus system in Gisborne was added to the Bee Card system in 2022, replacing the previous smartcard.

== Operation ==
The card is tapped at a card reader when getting on and off transport, and deducts the relevant fare. In some regions the fare is based on how many zones are travelled, other regions use a flat fare regardless of distance. The Te Huia train uses a portable onboard card reader that a passenger attendant uses to remotely scan each passenger's card to deduct the relevant fare based on distance travelled.

Cards and card balance can be purchased online or from the driver with cash when boarding.

== See also ==
- Public transport in New Zealand
- Public transport in the Otago Region
- Transport in Invercargill
- Public transport in New Plymouth
- Public transport in Waikato
