= Transport in Invercargill =

Transport in Invercargill, New Zealand is mostly by bus and private car.

== Roads ==
Invercargill is the southernmost city on New Zealand's state highway network and is linked to Fiordland and the Catlins by the Southern Scenic Route and Dunedin and Gore by SH 1. It is also the southern end of SH 6 coming from Queenstown and the West Coast. The main streets of Invercargill: Dee (SH 6) and Tay (SH 1) measure over 40 metres wide. Numerous roads in the city are dual-carriageway but there are no expressways/motorways proposed for the city.

== Railways ==
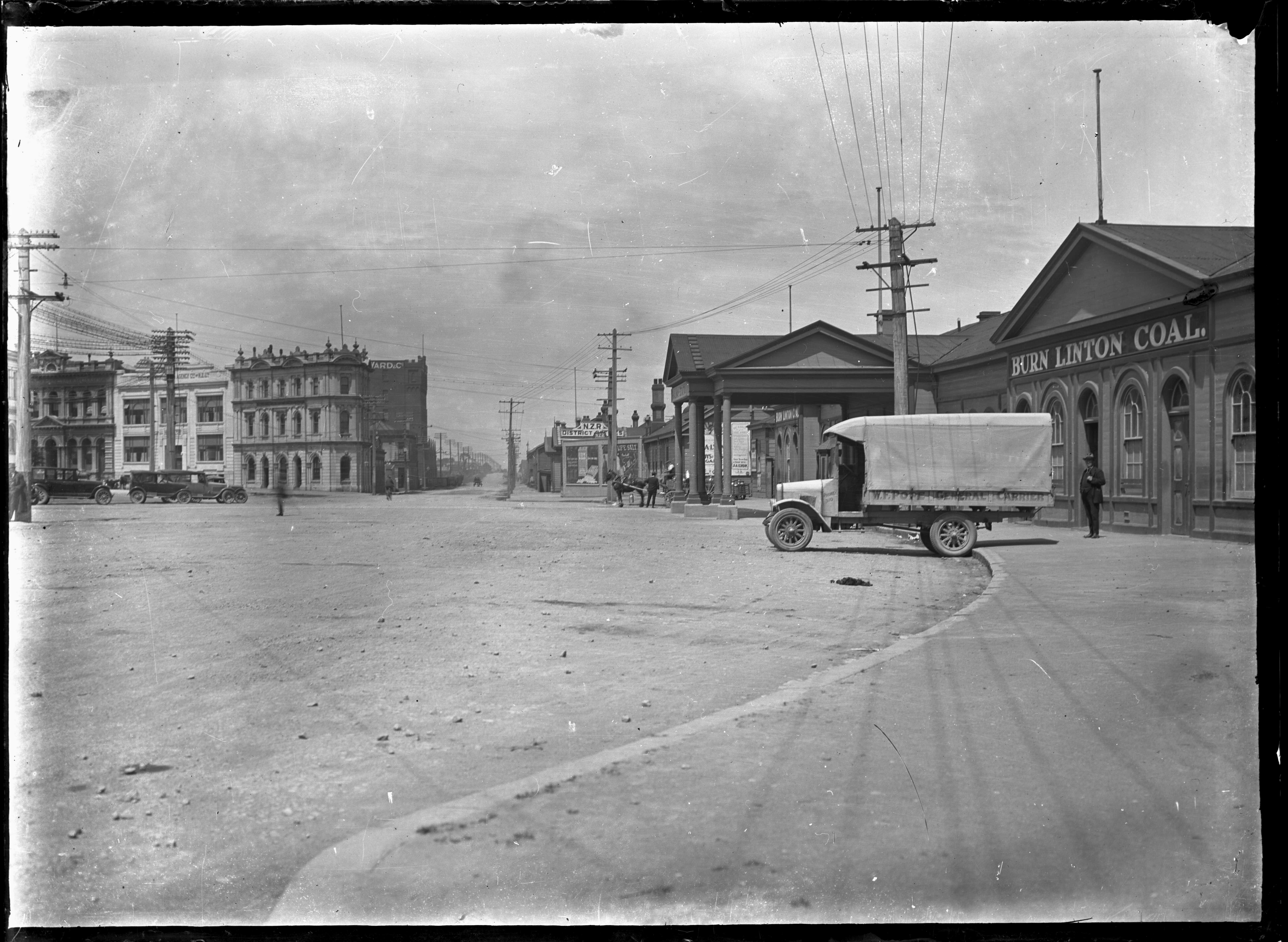
The square outside Invercargill Railway Station circa 1925

Invercargill was the first town in New Zealand to have a steam locomotive and was once the centre of a much larger rail network than at present. It is at the southern end of the Main South Line railway, which extends up the east coast to Christchurch and Lyttelton via Dunedin. Until the cancellation of The Southerner in 2002, Invercargill had the southernmost passenger railway station in the world. Passenger trains no longer call at Invercargill, except for occasional excursions. The Bluff Branch extends south from Invercargill and has been freight-only since 1967. The Wairio Branch extends northwest from Invercargill to the Solid Energy coalfields near Ohai and continues to carry freight even after the closing of the Ohai coal mine.

== Airport ==
During the mid-1950s, Invercargill Airport was used for fuel top-up and final take off by Operation Deep Freeze. Twin-engine propeller-driven aircraft destined for McMurdo Sound in the Antarctic used the airport, assisted in takeoff by JATO rockets. Larger aircraft flew from Christchurch when a permanent Deep Freeze base was established there.

Air New Zealand operates daily flights to Christchurch and to Wellington plus five weekly flights to Auckland. Stewart Island Flights make regular flights to and from Stewart Island / Rakiura. Mainland Air of Dunedin operates a Piper Navajo and is contracted to fly doctors to Southland Hospital several times per week from Dunedin Hospital.

Southern Wings is the only aeroclub based at the airport and runs charter flights as well as a flight school.

Invercargill Airport has the fourth longest runway in New Zealand at 2210 metres, after Auckland, Christchurch and Ohakea.

== Buses ==
Go Bus Transport provides services under contract to the Invercargill City Council. BusSmart cards were replaced with Bee Cards on 22 June 2020.

Prior to 1 April 2014, services were run by Invercargill Passenger Transport which was ultimately taken over by Go Bus. There are six bus routes and four BusSmart school bus routes

== Zero-fare services ==
Invercargill offered several zero-fare bus services in the first decade of the century.

The Freebie was a zero-fare loop service in the inner city, The Purple Circle was a free suburban bus circuit, and all other suburban bus services operated zero-fare between 9:00 am and 2:30 pm daily. The Mayor of Invercargill, Tim Shadbolt told a conference of New Zealand's Disabled Persons Assembly in October 2002 that Invercargill had an innovative approach to public transport, and that he hoped in future that all buses in Invercargill would be free and accessible.

However, central government requirements (NZ Transport Agency) for regional authorities to aim for a 50% fare recovery from public transport led to Invercargill's zero-fare services being discontinued, and new bus routes and timetables operated by BusSmart were introduced in December 2012. Senior citizens are still provided free off-peak travel via the government's SuperGold Travel Scheme. BusSmart's original routes were Waikiwi Link, Windsor Comet, Heidelberg Star and Kew Connection which got replaced in 2021 with 6 new bus routes which are Clifton 1, Kingswell 2, Newfield 3, Hargest 4, Waverley 5 and Waikiwi 6.

== Other transport services ==
=== Taxis ===
Invercargill has three taxi companies:

- Invercargill Taxis
- Blue Star Taxis
- Ezicab

=== Airport transport ===
Invercargill Airport is only 3 kilometres (1.9 mi) from the centre of the city and transport is mainly by taxi and shuttle van.

== Management of public transport ==
The Invercargill City Council specifies, tenders, subsidises and contracts with bus operators for provision of public transport in Invercargill. Passenger Transport Ltd currently holds this contract.

== Past service modes ==
=== Trains ===
From the opening of the Bluff Branch in 1867 until the cancellation of the final service in 1967, passenger trains operated between Invercargill and Bluff for commuters and school children. In 1950, seven trains ran each way on the average weekday, with eight on Fridays, five on Saturdays, and one on Sundays. By 1967, only one train ran each way on weekdays for the benefit of school children, and due to being unviable, it was cancelled.

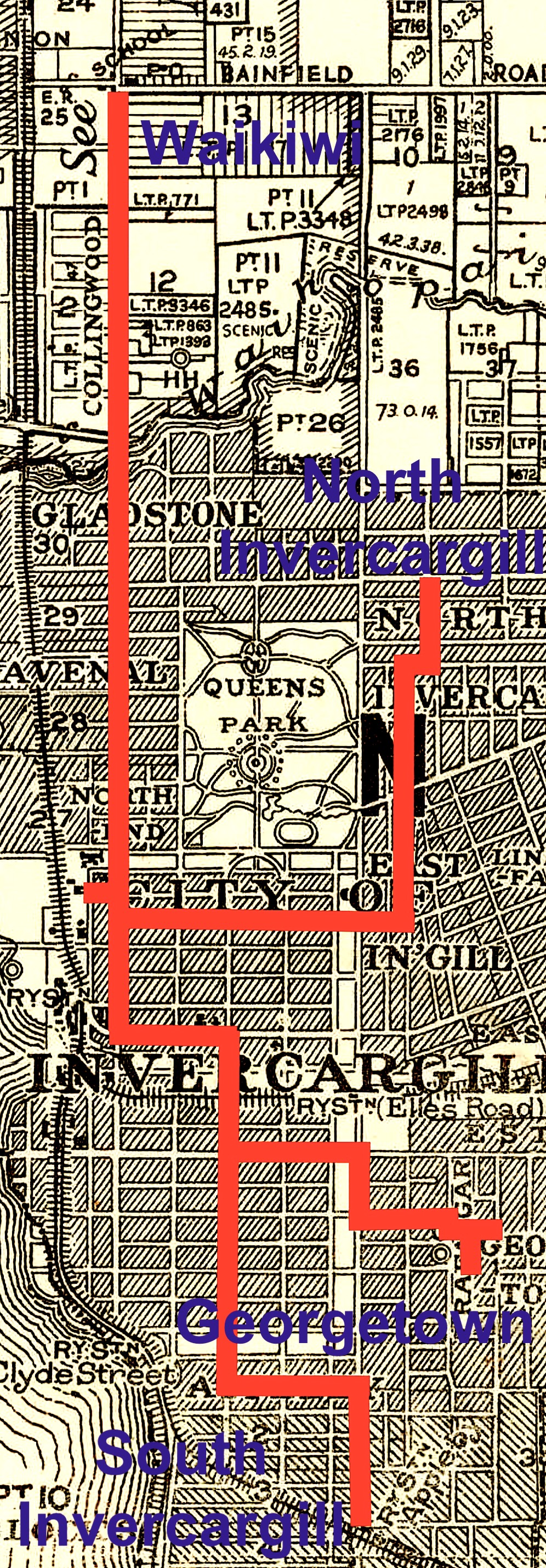
Tram routes as shown on a 1946 map

=== Trams ===
Invercargill's first tramway was a privately operated horse-drawn system, which ran from 1881 until 15 March 1908. A municipally owned electric tramway opened on 26 March 1912 and continued until 10 September 1952, when the last route was taken over by diesel buses. The electric system served Waikiwi, Georgetown, North Invercargill and South Invercargill, and the South Invercargill line, which ended at Tramway Road, was described as the southernmost electric street tramway in the world. Three tramcar bodies survive, and Birney No. 15 operates on the Christchurch heritage tramway.

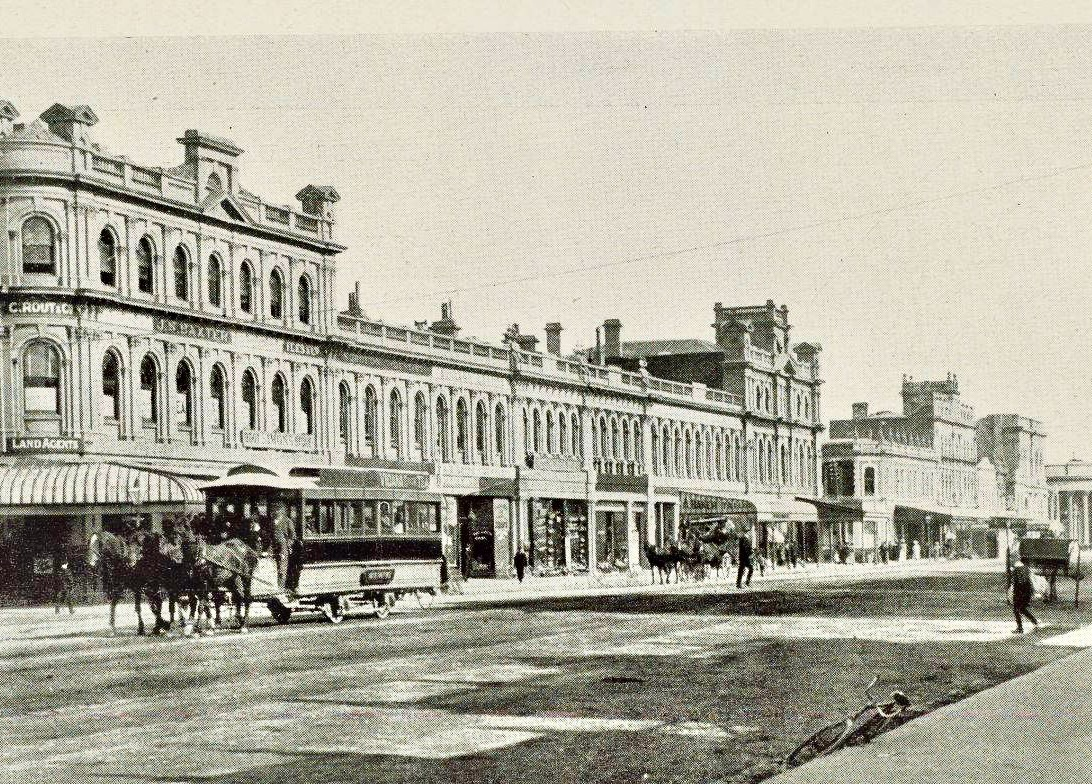
Horse tram in Dee St about 1908

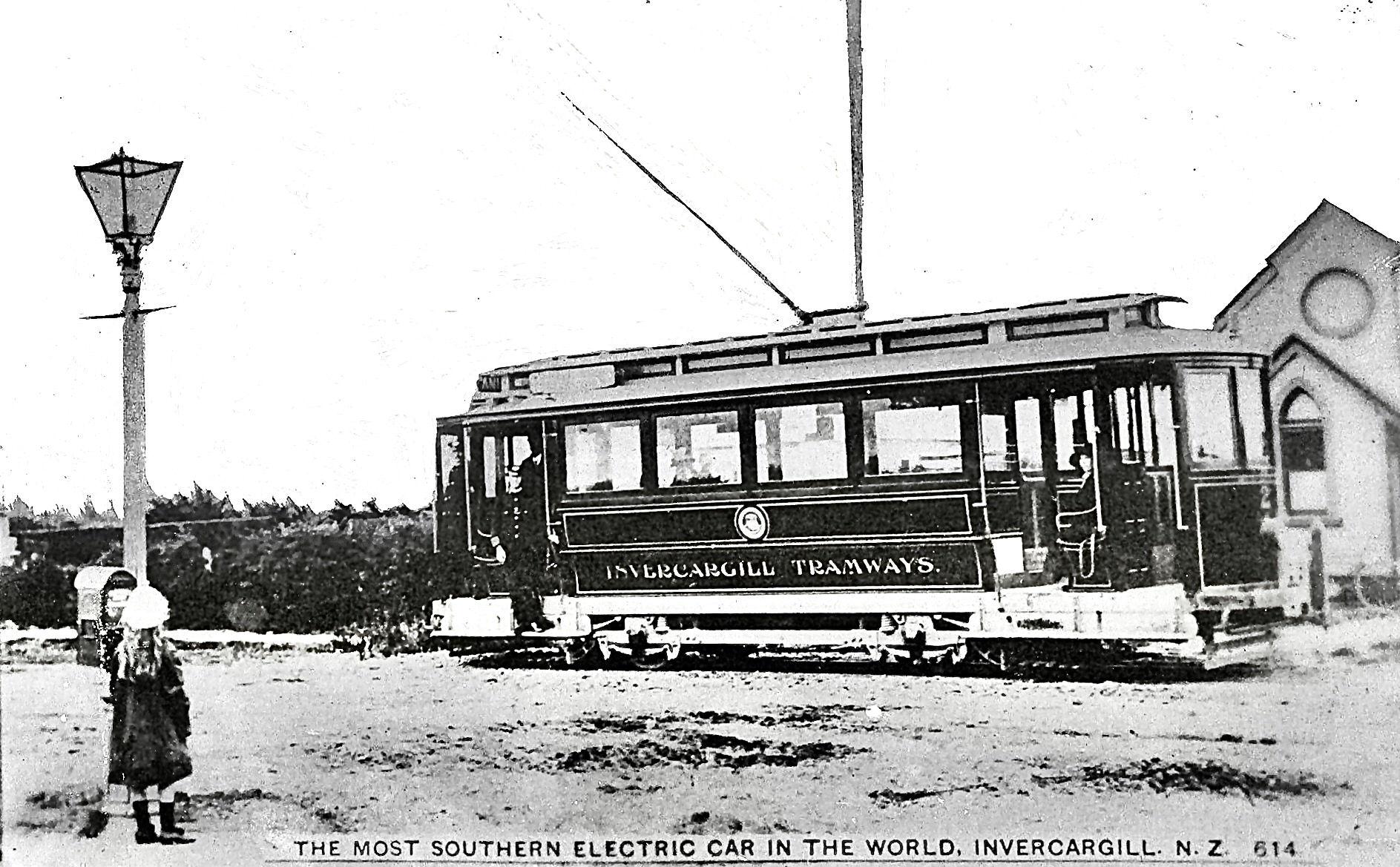
An Invercargill electric tram, about 1912

Restored Invercargill Birney car No. 15 operating in Christchurch in 2014
