= Duncan Laing =

New Zealand swimming coach (1933–2008)

Andrew James Duncan Laing CNZM OBE (20 June 1933 – 13 September 2008), generally known as Duncan Laing, was a New Zealand swimming coach based in Dunedin. He coached Olympian Danyon Loader, winner of two gold medals at the 1996 Atlanta Olympics and a silver medal at Barcelona in 1992, and Philip Rush, current world record holder for the fastest two and three way swim of the English Channel.

== Early life ==
Laing was born in New Plymouth and rose to sporting prominence in both swimming and rugby, playing 28 first class matches for Taranaki between 1952-1955. He also picked up numerous swimming titles during the 1940s and was a strong surf life saver, winning the Nelson Shield with the Fitzroy Surf Life Saving Club.

He was working at New Plymouth’s Kawaroa Pool as a volunteer swim coach and had built a home near New Plymouth's Rugby Park in the hope of picking up rugby coaching opportunities but plans changed when he saw an advertisement for a swim coach at Dunedin's Moana Pool.

== Dunedin coaching career ==
He began teaching at Moana Pool in 1966, and over 40 years training in Dunedin included 11 Olympic athletes. In 2003, Michael Phelps visited New Zealand to train under Laing.

His involvement in rugby continued as he coached senior club rugby teams and was a selector for Otago from 1982 -1985.

== Personal life ==
He married Betty Burgess in 1951, and they had six children, four sons and two daughters (one deceased). He also ran the Moana House rehabilitation centre with his wife.

He had since retired from professional coaching, and received treatment in 2006 for melanoma on his leg and a brain tumour.He died in Dunedin 13 September 2008 at the age of 75.

== Awards and honours ==
Laing was appointed an Officer of the Order of the British Empire in the 1993 Queen's Birthday Honours, and a Companion of the New Zealand Order of Merit, for services to sport, in the 2006 Queen's Birthday Honours.

One of the pools within the Moana Pool complex was renamed the Duncan Laing Pool in November 2010.

He was inducted into the New Zealand Sports Hall of Fame in 2005 and the Taranaki Sports Hall of Fame in 2017.

Awards
Preceded by Graham Lowe	Halberg Awards – Coach of the Year; 1992; 1996	Succeeded by Grant Clements
Not awarded in 1994 or 1995	Halberg Awards – Coach of the Year; 1992; 1996	Succeeded by Les Mills
