= Hanley's Farm =

Coordinates: 45.065°S 168.752°E

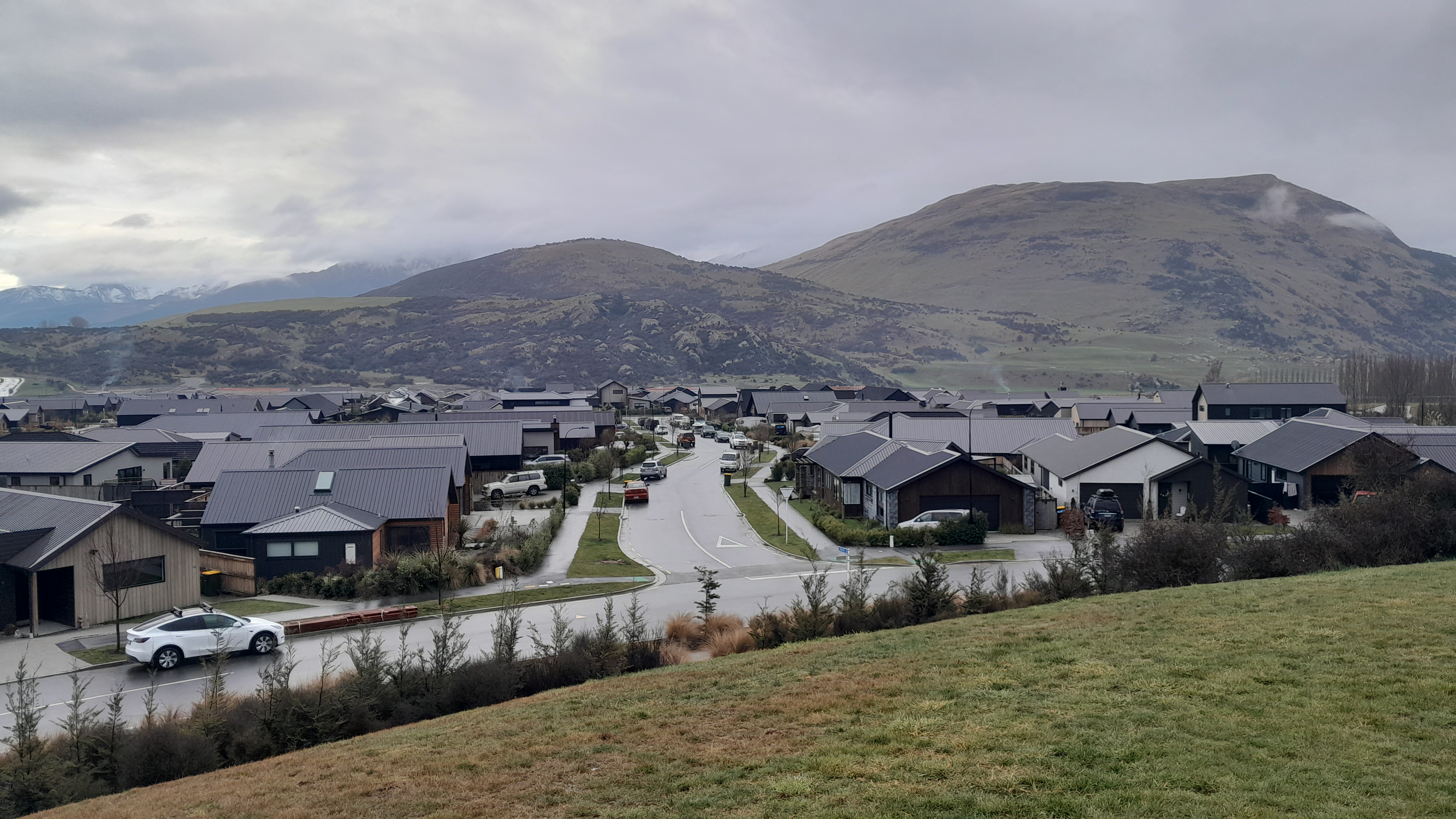
Hanley's Farm housing

Hanley's Farm is a suburb of Queenstown in the South Island of New Zealand. Development of the area began in 2018. Hanley's Farm has a land area of 561 hectares (1,390 acres).

To the south of Hanley's Farm is Jack's Point.

== History ==
Originally the name for the area was pitched as 'Henley Downs' but it was pointed out by the Queenstown Historical Society that it was in fact 'Hanley' as it was named after John (Jack) Hanley. Eventually the name of 'Hanley's Farm' was settled on.

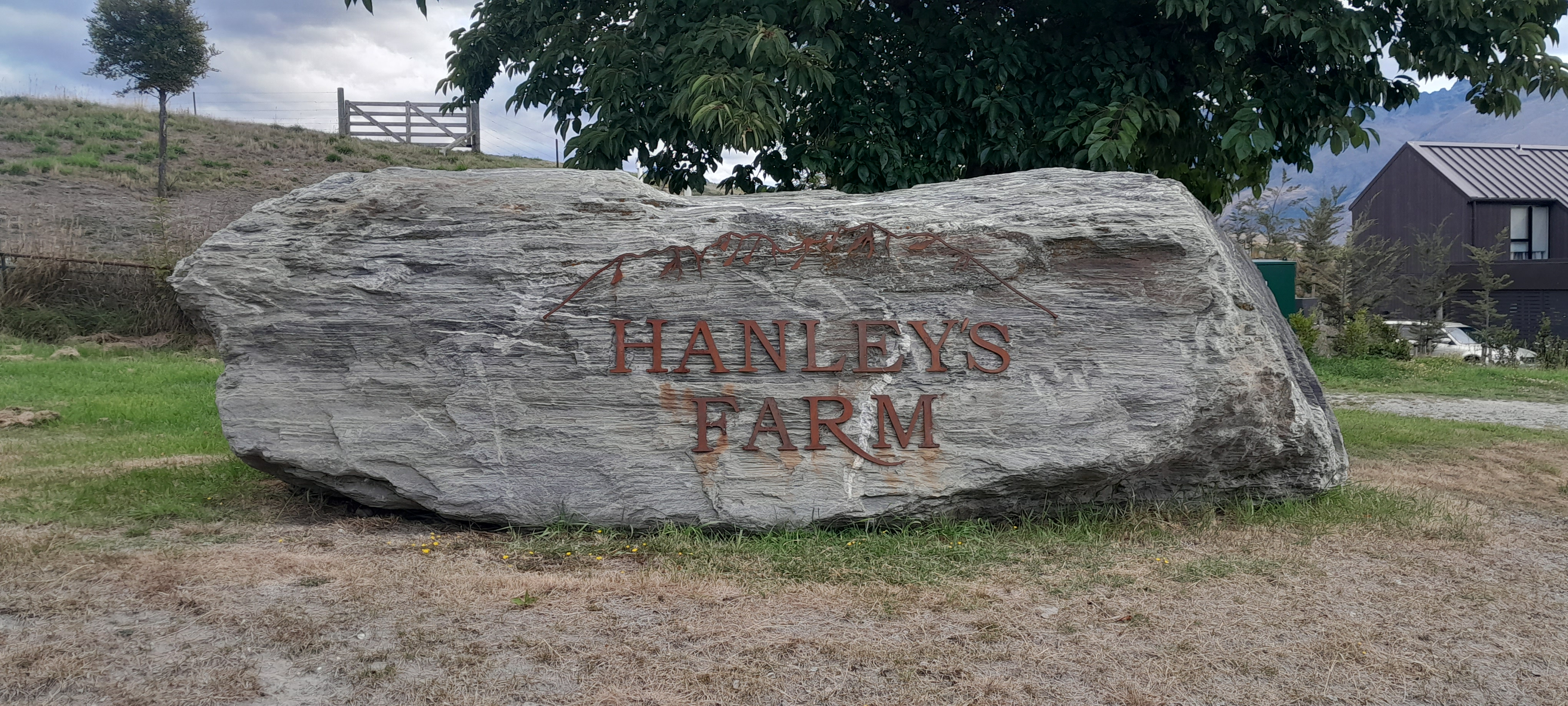
Hanley's Farm sign at the entrance

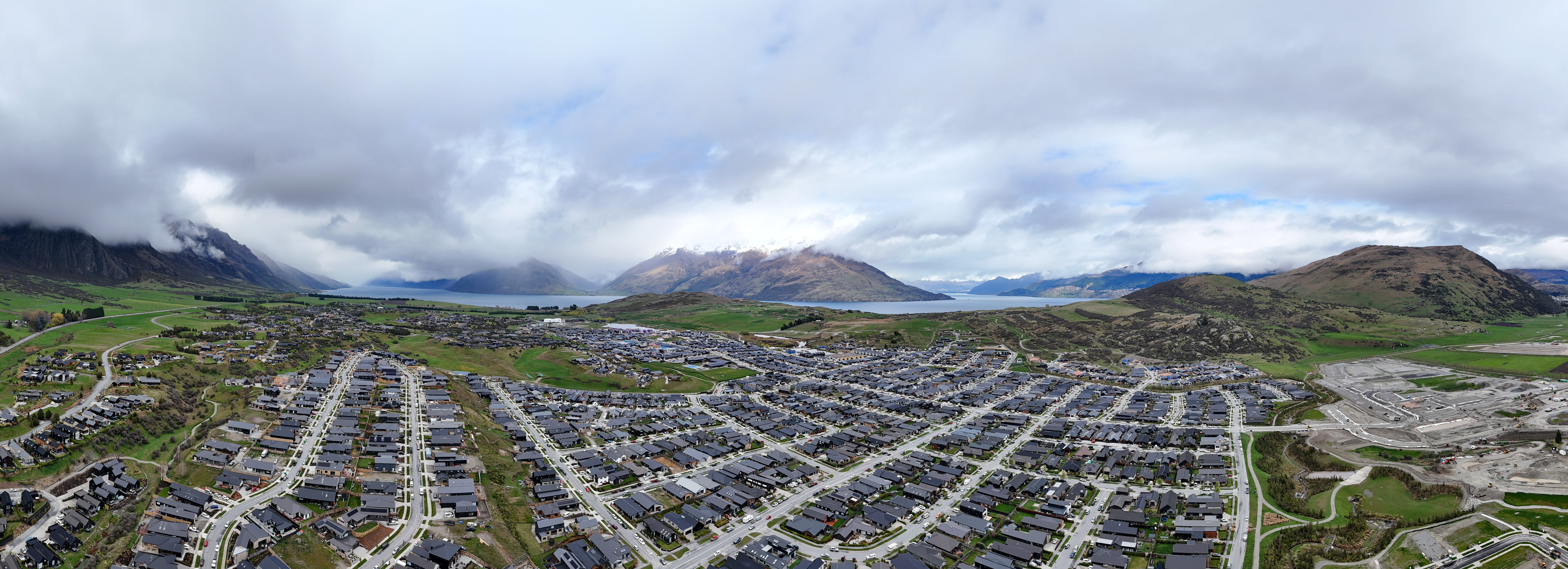
Hanleys Farm aerial panorama. October 2025

== Education ==
Hanley's Farm has a Primary School named Te Kura Whakatipu o Kawarau.
