= Birkenhead Transport (New Zealand) =

Bus Transport Corporation

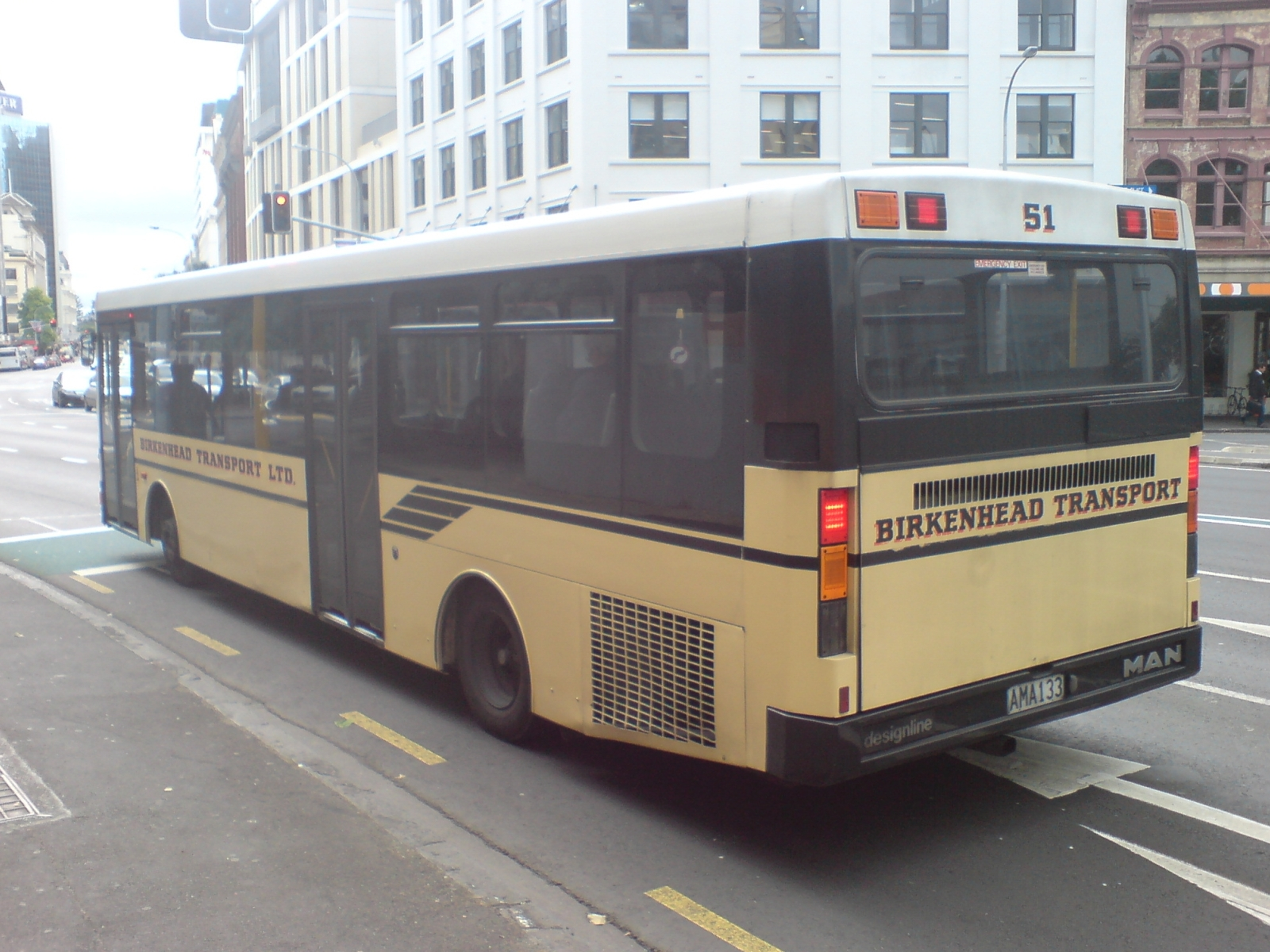
A Birkenhead Transport bus painted in the livery used from the company's inception in 1933

Birkenhead Transport Limited was a bus fleet operator based in the suburb of Birkdale, near Birkenhead on the North Shore of Auckland, New Zealand. In common with other Auckland bus fleet operators, it was contracted to Auckland Transport (AT), an Auckland Council entity to run timetabled suburban bus routes for AT Metro. Apart from this, the company ran no scheduled inter-city services and its buses were for hire.

In April 2018, Birkenhead Transport had 110 drivers. In May 2019, Birkenhead Transport was sold to Ritchies Transport Holdings.

== History ==
The company was founded in 1933 by Charles W. Inwards, who had arrived in New Zealand from England in 1919. It was being managed by the third and fourth generations of the Inwards family when it was sold to Ritchies in 2019.

== See also ==
- Public transport in Auckland
