= Queenstown Central =

- Suburb
- Interactive map of Queenstown Central
- Coordinates: 45.030°S 168.661°E
- Country: New Zealand
- City: Queenstown
- Local authority: Queenstown-Lakes District Council
- Electoral ward: Queenstown-Wakatipu Ward

Area
  - Land: 175 ha (430 acres)

Population (June 2025)
  - Total: 2,340
  - Density: 1,340/km^{2} (3,460/sq mi)

(Ben Lomond)	Arthurs Point	Queenstown Hill
	Queenstown Central	Queenstown East
Fernhill	(Lake Wakatipu)

Queenstown Central is the central business district of Queenstown in the South Island of New Zealand. It also contains residential areas. The area contains Queenstown Primary and St Joseph's schools, and contained Wakatipu High School until it moved to Frankton at the beginning of 2018.

Skyline Queenstown operates a gondola and luge to and from Ben Lomond, with the gondola operating since 1967 and the luge since 1998.

== Demographics ==
Queenstown Central covers 1.75 km^{2} (0.68 sq mi) and had an estimated population of 2,340 as of June 2025, with a population density of 1,337 people per km^{2}.

Historical population
Year	Pop.	±% p.a.
2006	2,205	—
2013	2,184	−0.14%
2018	2,502	+2.76%

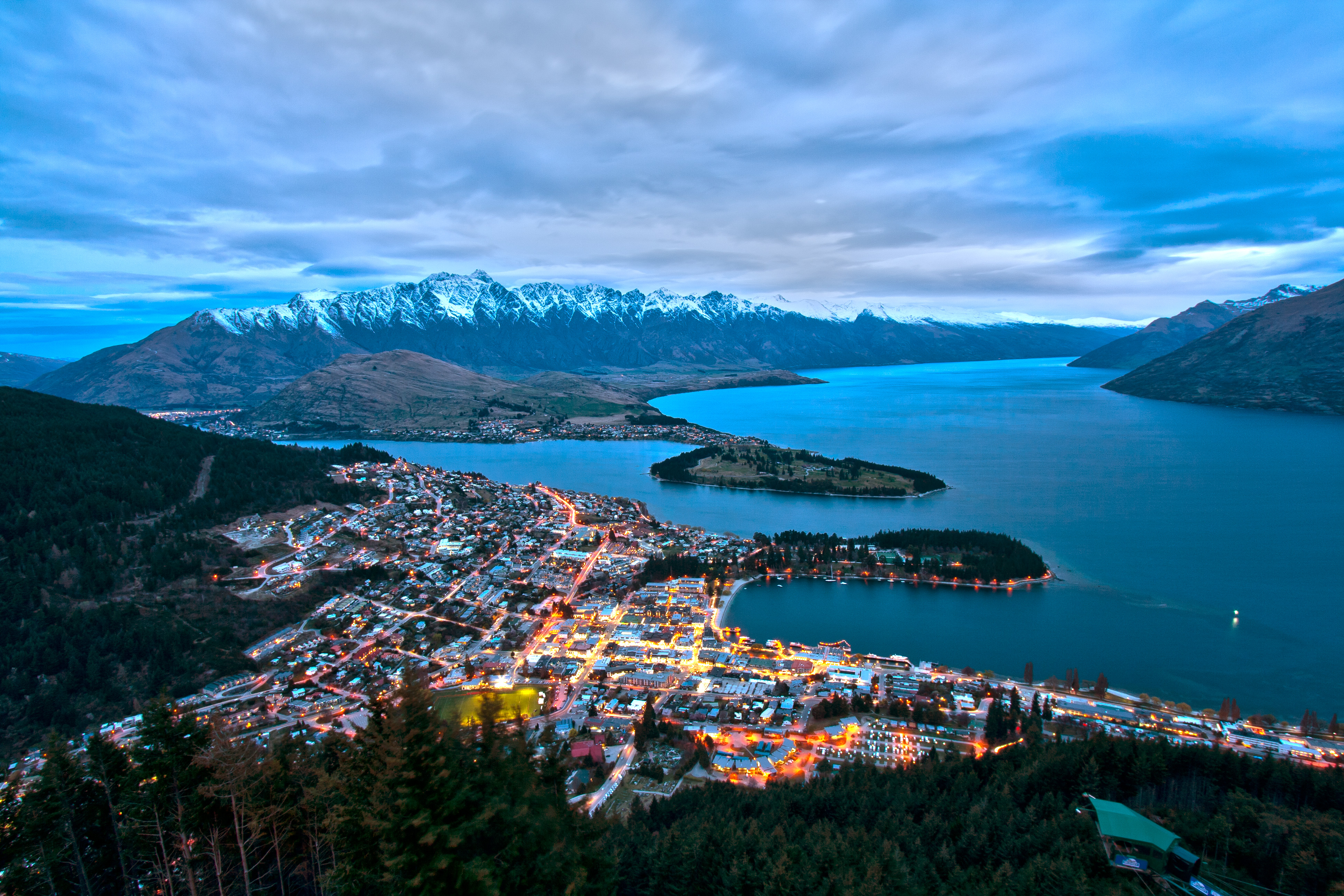
Queenstown from Bob's Peak

Queenstown Central had a population of 2,502 at the 2018 New Zealand census, an increase of 318 people (14.6%) since the 2013 census, and an increase of 297 people (13.5%) since the 2006 census. There were 651 households, comprising 1,281 males and 1,215 females, giving a sex ratio of 1.05 males per female, with 156 people (6.2%) aged under 15 years, 1,203 (48.1%) aged 15 to 29, 1,053 (42.1%) aged 30 to 64, and 90 (3.6%) aged 65 or older.

Ethnicities were 60.2% European/Pākehā, 3.0% Māori, 0.7% Pasifika, 23.1% Asian, and 15.9% other ethnicities. People may identify with more than one ethnicity.

The percentage of people born overseas was 76.9, compared with 27.1% nationally.

Although some people chose not to answer the census's question about religious affiliation, 59.8% had no religion, 28.7% were Christian, 0.1% had Māori religious beliefs, 2.2% were Hindu, 2.0% were Buddhist and 3.8% had other religions.

Of those at least 15 years old, 549 (23.4%) people had a bachelor's or higher degree, and 120 (5.1%) people had no formal qualifications. 162 people (6.9%) earned over $70,000 compared to 17.2% nationally. The employment status of those at least 15 was that 1,974 (84.1%) people were employed full-time, 159 (6.8%) were part-time, and 21 (0.9%) were unemployed.

Individual statistical areas
Name	Area (km^{2})	Population	Density (per km^{2})	Households	Median age	Median income
Queenstown Central	0.81	1,017	1,256	261	30.0 years	$34,300
Warren Park	0.94	1,485	1,580	390	28.7 years	$34,200
New Zealand					37.4 years	$31,800
