= Go Bus Transport =

Large bus company in New Zealand

Go Bus Regional
- Formerly: Go Bus Transport
- Founded: 31 December 2004
- Ceased operation: Urban operations as Go Bus stopped in 2023 (as part of merger into Kinetic Urban NZ), regional operations continue as Go Bus Regional.
- Service area: Auckland, Hamilton, Tauranga, Gisborne, Hawkes Bay, Dunedin, Invercargill, Queenstown
- Service type: Bus service, inter-city coach service, tour buses, coach charters, student transport
- Operator: Kinetic Group
- Website: https://www.wearekinetic.com

Go Bus Transport Ltd (Go Bus Regional) is a bus company operating in New Zealand owned by Australian-based transport operator Kinetic Group. The company runs regional bus services in Auckland, Hamilton, Hawke's Bay, Tauranga, Gisborne, Dunedin and Invercargill.

In March 2020, it was announced the company and its 1700 buses would be sold to Kinetic Group, subject to Overseas Investment Office approval. Approval was given in June and the acquisition was completed in August 2020.

When Kinetic Group purchased NZ Bus in 2022, Go Bus and NZ Bus' urban businesses were combined into Kinetic Urban NZ. The Go Bus brand continues to operate its regional routes as Go Bus Regional.

== History ==
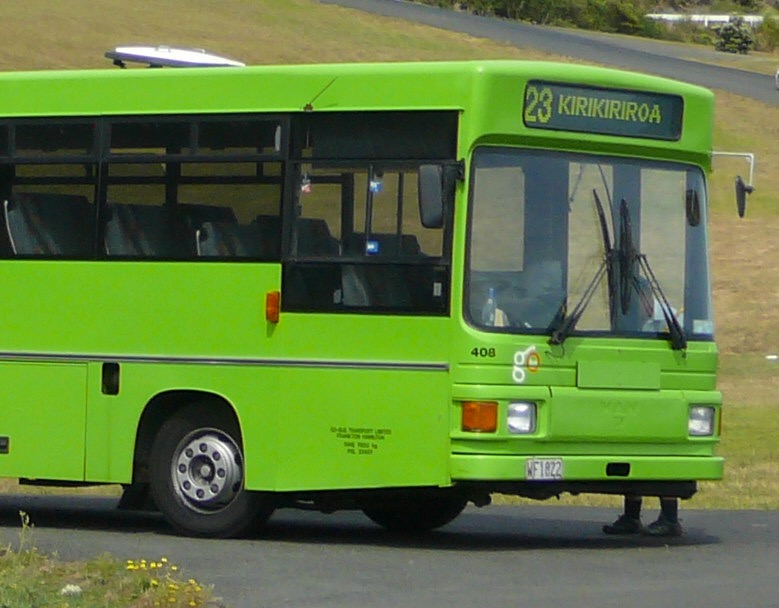
Go Bus MAN 11.190 in 2008

In 2004, Go Bus was formed by the merger of C.J. Worth Ltd., trading as Blue Worth Coachlines and Hamilton City Buses (privatised in the 1990s), Simpsons and Hodgsons. Craig Worth was still commercial director in 2019.

=== Original constituent companies ===
==== Buses Ltd ====
Buses Ltd was one of the companies forming Go Bus. It was formed in 1927 by the amalgamation of Blue Bus Co Ltd and Branton & Hodgson Public Motors. Rawlinson & Branton Bros. had run Hamilton-Frankton buses as Waikato Motor Co. from about 1914 and to Ngāruawāhia from 1924. By 1928 Buses Ltd was described as having a virtual monopoly of Hamilton buses. Buses Ltd was bought by Hamilton City Council in about 1980 and renamed Hamilton City Buses Ltd.

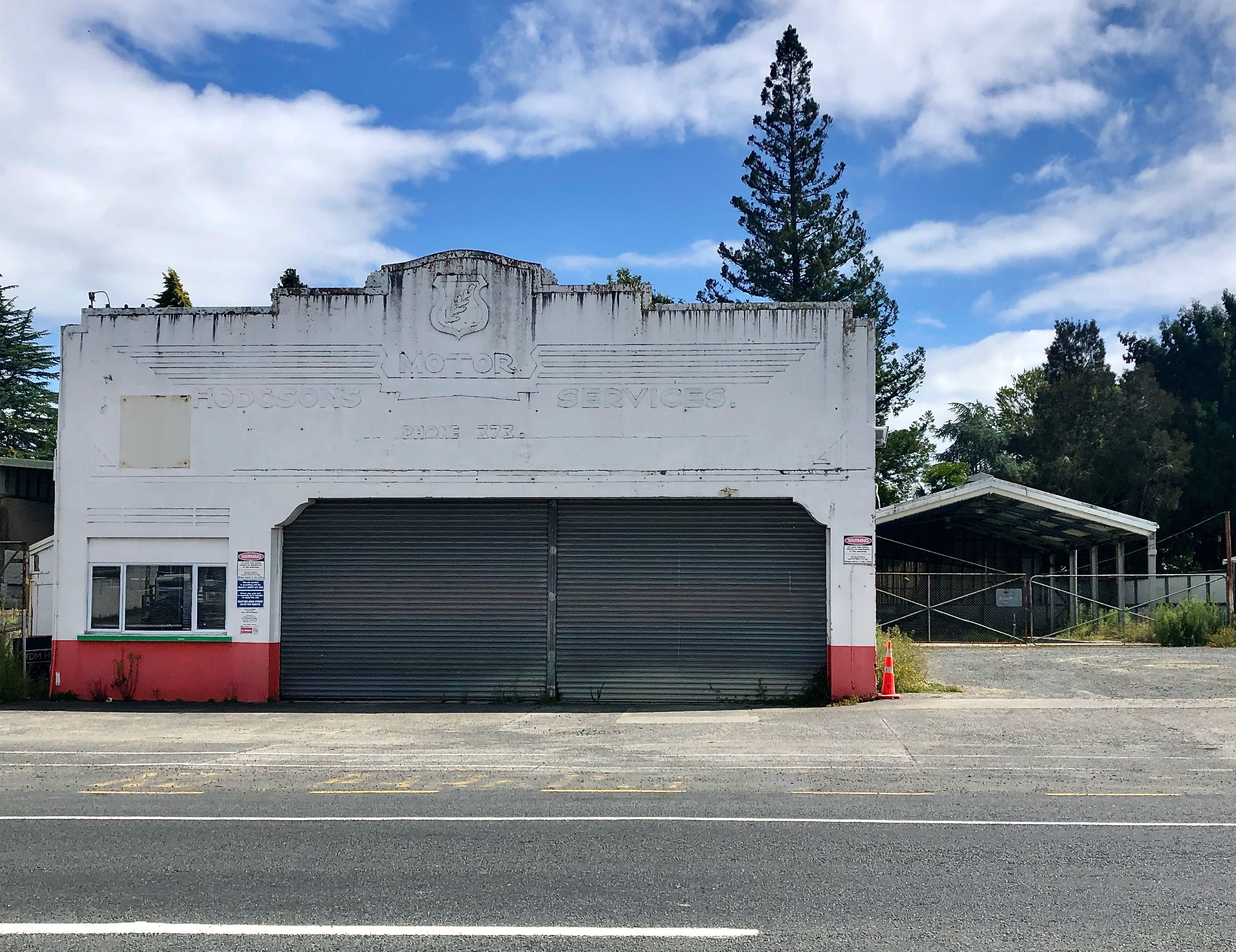
Hodgson's Motors garage, Te Awamutu in 2021

==== Lewis Hodgson Motor Services ====
Hodgson's of Te Awamutu, was another of the companies forming Go Bus. It was incorporated on 23 Feb 1937 and dissolved on 1 Jan 2005. Prior to that, in 1932 Lewis Hodgson had started a Kihikihi to Te Awamutu railway station service, took over the Pirongia, Whatawhata and Hamilton route, which had been running from 1926 and was still running in 1942 and ran buses to Tokanui from 1933. Lewis' son, Reece Hodgson, was killed while driving a Te Awamutu-Tauranga excursion in 1950. The 1937 brick and concrete, art deco garage in Te Awamutu was in use until 2020, when it was advertised for sale. It remained in 2021, but was to be replaced by 16 houses.

==== Simpsons ====
Simpsons ran Huntly buses from at least 1929. Simpsons Bus Services Limited operated from 1978 to 1998 and from then to 2008. The bus operations were sold in 2003, when the company had 34 buses.

=== Controlling shareholders ===
Wellington investment group Morrison and Co. had become a 41% shareholder by 2005.

In 2007, Direct Capital bought 87% of Go Bus. The other 13% remained with Go Bus managers and directors. Go Bus then had 410 vehicles, 4 workshops, 8 depots and 460 staff. By 2010, it had 650 buses and over 700 staff. From 2007 to 2012, Go Bus more than doubled its fleet and increased its staff to 950. Direct put Go Bus up for sale, saying it needed more capital to continue expanding.

In 2012, another private equity fund, Australia's Next Capital, bought Direct's 86.8% of Go Bus for $84.6m.

In 2014, Ngāi Tahu Holdings Corp (2/3) and Tainui Group Holdings (1/3) bought Go Bus for a reported $170m.

In 2020, Ngāi Tahu Holdings and Tainui Group Holdings agreed to sell passenger transport company Go Bus to Melbourne-based industry operator Kinetic. The sale was finalised in August 2020.

=== Expansion ===
Some growth has been by acquisition of bus companies (see below), some by winning new contracts. Among the latter have been –

- 2009 contract for Napier and Hastings, renewed in 2015 after a 60% growth in passengers.
- 2009 Tauranga $7.5m ($3m less than previous operator, Bayline Coaches) 5 1/2 year contract with Environment Bay of Plenty Bay. Bayline had run 25 buses daily, but the new service used 35 buses and 42 staff, with depots in Tauranga, Mt Maunganui and Te Puke.
- 2013 won Gisborne contract by cutting the $320,000 a year Waipawa Red Bus service to $217,776 (plus $5,000 for cycle racks in the first year), with two air-conditioned 27-seat 'GizzyBuses' and a reduced timetable. GoBus also tendered for large buses at $225,941 a year.
- 2015 won 8 bus Gisborne school contract from Waipawa.

== Acquired bus companies ==
=== Christchurch Bus Services ===
Christchurch Bus Services Ltd operated Metro routes for Environment Canterbury in Christchurch and Timaru, as well as private charter services for groups and schools. It was purchased in December 2010 by Go Bus.

During a surprise New Zealand police investigation where the police without notice ordered buses to be inspected physically and mechanically whilst driving as per normal found 62 buses out of the 114 buses inspected in the Christchurch surprise sting operation had defects requiring repair. Out of the 62 buses found defective, 28 were ordered off the road and pink-stickered meaning significant failure was imminent when operating the bus; the vehicle was not permitted for driving on public roads. The remaining 34 were ordered out of passenger service but were still considered road worthy.

The 28 pink-stickered buses windscreens had a pink sticker adhered to the windscreen by police inspectors and legally must be inspected by a vehicle inspector during a certificate of fitness before removal, after receiving a certificate of road worthiness. Some of the severe faults included bald tires, loose steering, and major fuel leaks. Most of these defective buses inspected were under operation from Christchurch Bus Services Ltd, with the minority being from Red Bus LTD and the Urban Cat services. The minority had no pink-stickered vehicles. The amount of buses taken off the road from Christchurch Bus Services violated the contract terms with Environment Canterbury for not being able to operate the services adequately and in a safe manner, with all contracted buses requiring a certificate of fitness at all times of operation. Christchurch Bus Services Ltd was given an ultimatum to sell the company to a different provider or risk losing their contracts. Christchurch Bus Services LTD in Late November 2010 was forced to sell their business to Go Bus.

==== Delays in bus delivery ====
However, Christchurch experienced an earthquake in September of 2010 and a plethora of aftershocks following. Depots, buses, and vital infrastructure required for adequate and safe bus operation were damaged and destroyed during the earthquake and aftershocks following. Older vehicles had to be sourced from Auckland, Taurunga and Wellington as well as various other towns and cities throughout New Zealand as many of the buses used in Christchurch were either destroyed, damaged, or delayed in because of the bus building factories in Canterbury having delays in manufacturing due to damage sustained in the Christchurch and delays in part delivery. A collapsed wall at the Designline's bus factory in Rollestone - interrupted production of 23 buses for Lepoard and delayed arrival for Redbus. Flooding in China interrupted production of Zhong Tong buses for supply to Christchurch Bus Services in 2010 also.

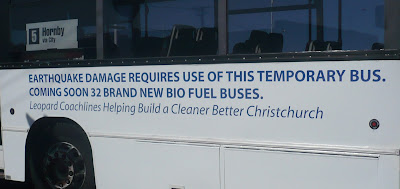
MAN SL202 acquired by Leopard Coachlines from NZBus Auckland

Some of the faults could have also been attributed to an aging fleet due to the September 2010 Christchurch Earthquake and subsequent aftershocks from 2010. Kiwi Coaches Charters Ltd in Māngere, Auckland and New Zealand Coach Services in Upper Hut have also been scrutinised by the New Zealand Transport Agency for defects similarly on the exact same bus models used by Christchurch Bus Companies in lieu of bus manufacturing delays and damages caused by the Christchurch Earthquakes. Calvin West of Kiwi Coaches called the NZTA ordeal baseless and a "witch hunt". However, the Christchurch inspection was sudden and on the road meaning various factors from bus operation on the road could of occurred. The inspection at Kiwi Coaches took the oldest vehicle in their yard and inspected it, various re-registrations through the process of re-bodying where an existing chassis receives a new body to extend the usable life of the bus made the oldest buses age sit around 30 years old at the time of inspection. Christchurch Buses Limited followed a similar practice of re-bodying from the same bodybuilder Designline, making Frakenstein like buses out of various parts from many truck, camper van and bus manufacturers. A lack of uniformity in parts, bodywork and various ages of said parts on the re-bodied buses may of caused issues with diagnostic, repairs and part availability causing the faults on Christchurch Buses Limited fleet to be amplified in comparison to other operators.

=== Urban Cat ===
In July 2013, Go Bus Transport took over the 'Urban Cat' Christchurch urban bus operations of Leopard Coachlines, gaining around 90 buses.

=== Hawarden Garage ===
Based in Kaiapoi, Hawarden Garage & Transport Co Ltd was bought at the end of 2013.

=== Invercargill Passenger Transport ===
In April 2014, Go Bus took over Invercargill Passenger Transport, which at that time was trading as Passenger Transport Citibus throughout the southern South Island.

=== Johnston's Coachlines ===
In August 2016, Go Bus announced that they had acquired Johnston's Coachlines for an undisclosed sum from TR Group Limited. Johnston's is a tourism-based bus company with depots in Auckland, Christchurch and Queenstown. The main purpose of the acquisition was the company's experience in the high-end tour market. It was stated that the companies will operate in a parent-subsidiary manner, as Johnston's will retain its own brand and division. The purchase did not include Johnston's Gray Line tours.
