= Moana Pool =

Swimming pool in Dunedin, New Zealand

Coordinates: 45.869655°S 170.497116°E

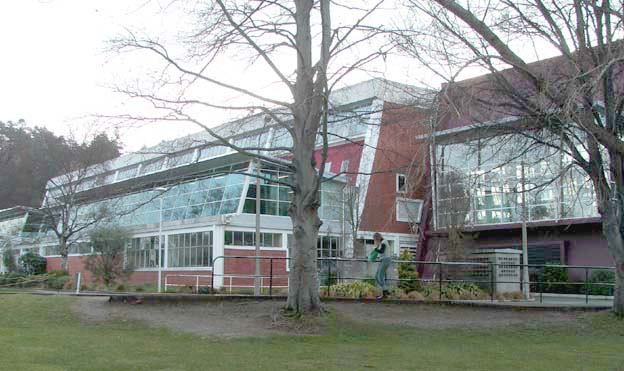
- Moana Pool main entrance
- Interactive map of Moana Pool
- Address: Dunedin, New Zealand

Construction
- Built: 1960s
- Opened: 14 November 1964
- Architects: Bill Hesson and Ian Ballantyne (Dunedin City Council); Robert Tongue (Dunedin City Council)

Moana Pool is a swimming pool in Dunedin, New Zealand. It is the largest swimming pool in the southern half of New Zealand's South Island. It is located at the corner of Littlebourne Road and Upper Stuart Street close to Otago Boys' High School, on the slopes of Roslyn, overlooking the centre of the city of Dunedin. The pool complex can be seen from much of the city, and commands extensive views over central and coastal Dunedin.

The largest of Dunedin's four public pools, Moana Pool was built in the early 1960s on the site of the old Moana Tennis Club, Its name (the Māori word for "sea") is thus coincidentally related to the pool's facilities. It was opened on 14 November 1964.

Costing £450,000, the pool was a replacement for the 1914 tepid pools in Lower Moray Place, which were seen as being inadequate for the city's modern needs. Several proposals for new pool facilities were put forward during the 1950s, mainly incorporating a suite of pools and a gymnasium surrounded by a sun terrace. A 1959 proposal, with an indoor main pool and learners' pool and an outdoor diving pool was put forward in 1959, and - with an amendment to place the diving pool under cover — was agreed by the Dunedin City Council. Initial design work by architect Bill Hesson and Ian Ballantyne of the Council's engineering department was completed by mid 1961, and work by Downer & Company began on construction shortly thereafter.

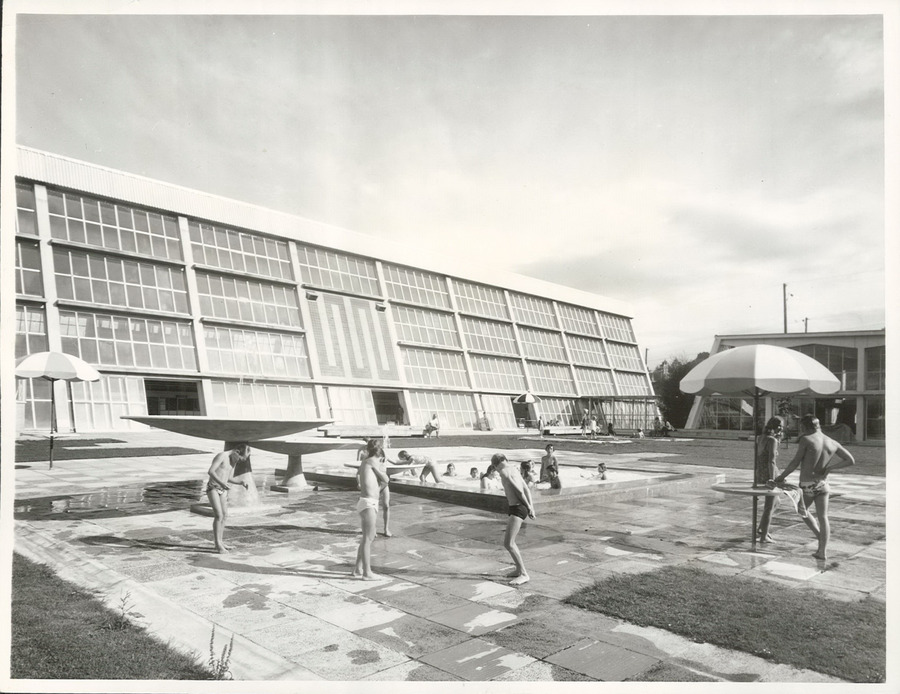
Children's Play area and paddling pool near the main pool, 1971. This area is now a partly paved, partly grassed barbeque area.

The pool complex has undergone several expansions since its opening in 1964, at which time only the main pool and diving pool were complete. The main pool is of Olympic dimensions (50m by 17.5m), and is kept heated to 28.5 degrees Celsius. It can be divided by a moveable bulkhead into two 25m pools; The original diving pool, which is still in use, is 13m by 7.2m with two 1m boards, a 3m board and a high 5m platform. The learners' pool was completed and opened in 1965, and a small restaurant was added to the facilities in the same year. Between 1984 and 1990, two hydroslides were added to the complex, and additions to the learners pool to encourage young families were also made. The restaurant was removed in 1991, replaced by gym facilities, and the sun terrace was revamped, removing two trampolines which had been located there. The gym's facilities were extensively enlarged in 2006.

A major expansion to the complex in 2000–01 was undertaken under the supervision of city council architect Robert Tongue. This removed much of the sun terrace, replacing it with a wave pool and leisure complex, revamped and upgraded much of the complex's reception area, and extended the main pool complex with the addition of new, Olympic-standard, diving facilities. The new 25m by 14m dive/lap pool includes three platforms (10, 7.5, and 5 metre) and four springboards (two at 3 metres, two at one metre). When not in use for diving, this pool converts into six-lane lap pool.

Moana Pool has been used for regional and national championships in swimming, diving, and water polo, and is a regular host of the New Zealand Masters' Games, which are held in Dunedin every two years.

Two of the pools within the Moana Pool complex were renamed in November 2010 to honour double-Olympic gold medallist Danyon Loader and noted coach Duncan Laing, who spent much of their careers training and working at Moana Pool.
