= TR Group =

New Zealand transportation company

TR Group Limited
- Type: Private
- Industry: Rentals
- Founded: 1992; 34 years ago in Auckland, New Zealand.
- Founder: Andrew Carpenter, Ron Carpenter
- Number of locations: 17 (New Zealand and Australia) (2024)
- Services: Fleet management Truck and trailer rental Driver training Used Vehicle Sales
- Number of employees: 275 (2023)
- Website: trgroup.co.nz

TR Group Limited is a New Zealand vehicle rental and lease company specialising in heavy trucks and trailers. Headquartered in Auckland, it has branches across New Zealand and Australia. It provides rental vehicles, leasing and driver training. The company is privately held, but has significant investment from Fisher Funds, Direct Capital, NZ Super Fund and Te Pūia Tāpapa.

== History ==
TR Group Ltd was formed as Trailer Rentals Ltd in 1992 with the purchase of the CHEP trailer fleet in New Zealand. Since then, the company has grown both organically and by acquisition, initially purchasing Truck Rental from Esanda Fleetpartners in 1998 (110 trucks) and combining operations to form TR Group Ltd. Orix Truck Rentals was acquired in 2007 using related shell company Elite Truck Rentals Ltd.

=== Driver training ===
To provide training services, Master Drive Services was acquired in 2015 (eventually rebranded to TR Driver Training) and DT Driver Training in 2018.

TR Driver Training focuses on heavy vehicle class licensing, endorsements and other heavy vehicle training.

=== Sponsorship and community ===
NZ Truck Driving Championships 2022 Variety the Children's Charity NSW ACT Variety B to B Bash 2024 TMC Trailers Trucking Industry Show 2025

=== Australia ===
Expansion into Australia was initiated with the purchase of Semi Skel Hire Pty in 2019 (1100 trailers) and, in 2023, both Perth-based Axle Hire (250 vehicles) and Adelaide-based Southern Cross Rentals (130 trailers)

== Alternative fuels ==
TR Group has invested heavily in alternative fuel trucks, being the first in the Southern Hemisphere to offer rental electric heavy trucks and hydrogen-fuelled trucks via its leasing options.
