= Invercargill Passenger Transport =

Passenger Transport

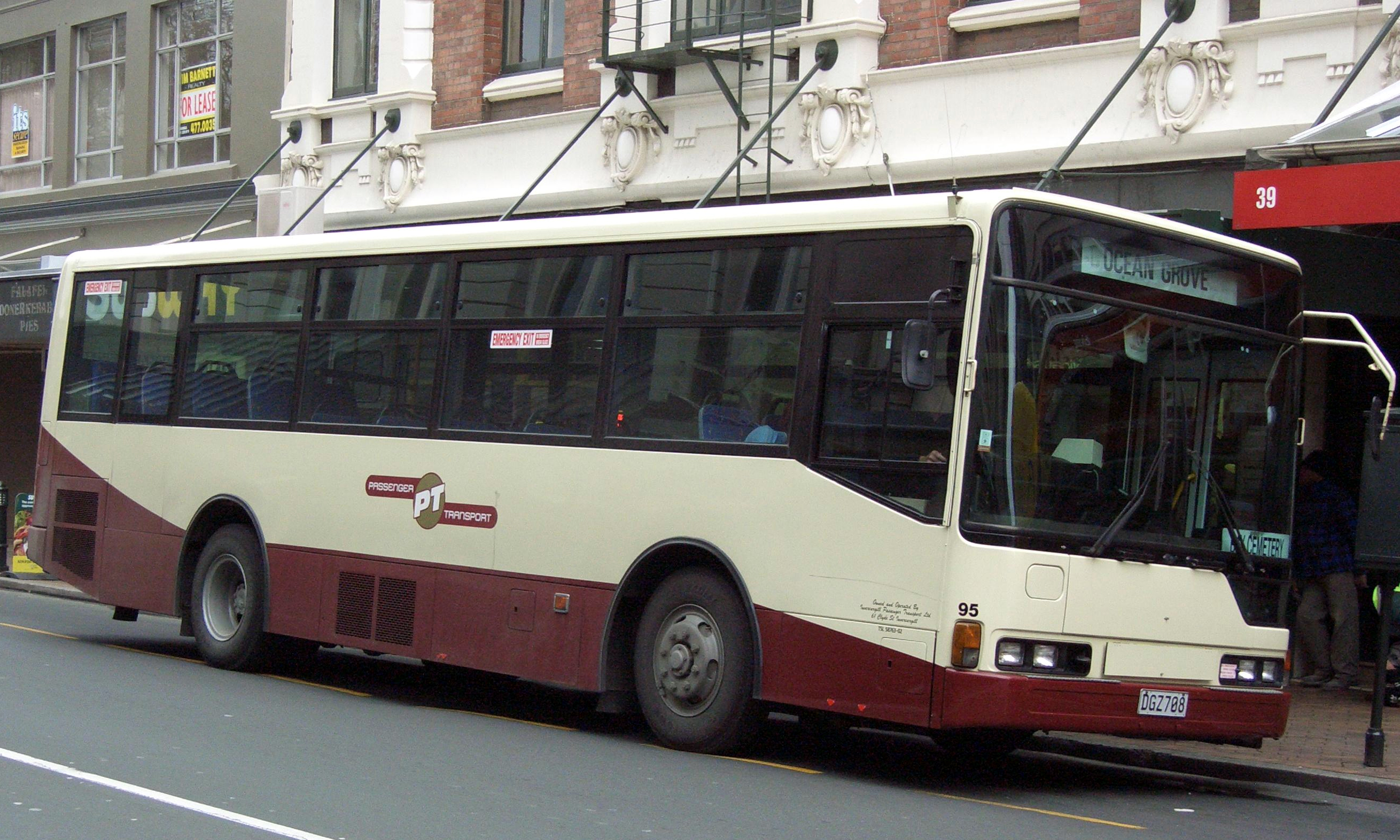
- Founded: 1991
- Defunct: 2014
- Headquarters: Invercargill
- Service area: Invercargill, Dunedin, Queenstown, Christchurch
- Service type: bus service, inter-city coach service, coach charter
- Fuel type: Diesel

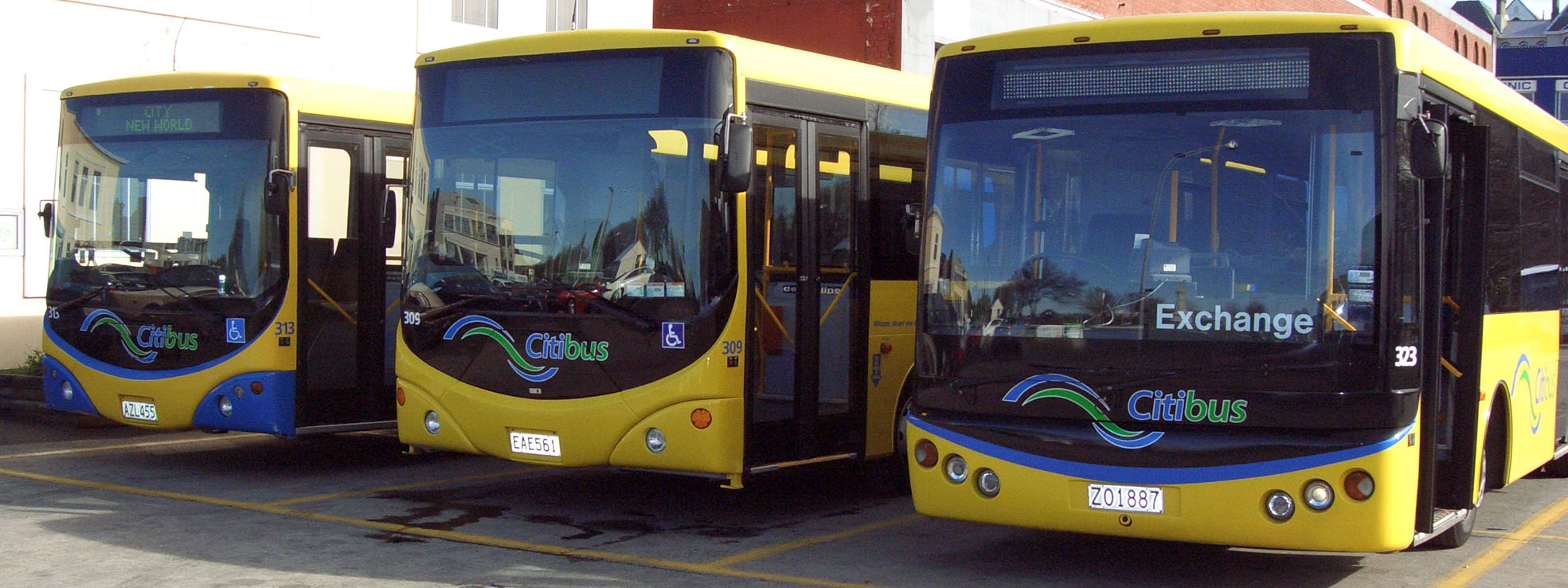
Passenger Transport Citibus buses at the Dunedin depot.

Invercargill Passenger Transport Ltd was a bus company which operated public transport routes in Dunedin and Invercargill as well as school transport services in those cities as well as Queenstown and leisure and tourism transport services throughout the South Island of New Zealand

== Company history ==
Invercargill Passenger Transport was formed in 1991 through the privatisation of the Invercargill City Council bus fleet. In 1995 the company established a branch in Dunedin and has operated part of Dunedin's bus network since. It eventually expanded to have branches in Christchurch and Queenstown and for a period operated a fleet of coaches based in Auckland.

== Sold to Go Bus Transport Ltd ==
In early February 2014, Go Bus Transport agreed to purchase the urban, school, charter and special needs operations of Invercargill Passenger Transport, gaining around 200+ buses and depots in Christchurch, Queenstown, Dunedin, Invercargill and Gore. Go Bus took over Invercargill Passenger Transport on 1 April 2014.

== Invercargill depot ==
Invercargill depot was the head office of the company. From this depot since 1991 Passenger Transport has operated public transport in Invercargill under contract to the Southland Regional Council initially and latterly the Invercargill City Council, much of this with the previous council-owned bus fleet.

As well as urban bus services, Passenger Transport also operate school services in Invercargill and outlying areas of Southland, New Zealand, inter-city coach services under the nakedbus.com franchise and a charter operation including worker transport to the Tiwai Point Aluminium Smelter in Bluff, New Zealand.

== Dunedin Depot ==
Passenger Transport was able to expand its operations to Dunedin in the 1995 annual tender rounds of urban bus services and held a large number of services in the city.

In 2011, Passenger Transport bought competitor Citibus from the Dunedin City Council.

Citibus, previously called Citibus-Newton, began as the municipal transport service in Dunedin known at various times as Dunedin City Transport, Dunedin Corporation Transport, Dunedin Corporation Tramways or DCT. DCT operated Dunedin's cable car system and trams (some of which were built by private developers) as a municipal transport department of the Dunedin City Council. In the mid-1980s Rogernomics reforms, the department was incorporated as a Local Authority Trading Enterprise and named Citibus Ltd.

Newton's Coachways was a charter coach, sightseeing and school bus company and was formed from an earlier business Marshall Motors in 1962 which was bought by Stewart Newton and Norma Newton (née Marshall) from Norma's uncle. In 1991 Newton's took over the Dunedin area services and fleet of the New Zealand Railways Road Services, then known as Cityline and re-branded it Newton's City Line. Newton's was taken over by Citibus in 1993, and the combined firm traded for many years as Citibus-Newton Ltd or CNL. It reverted to Citibus in 2005, but the Newton's brand for tour and charter coaches remained in use by Invercargill Passenger Transport.

In 2006 CNL took over inter-city coach operator Wanaka Connexions.

By 2011, Citibus was described by city mayor Dave Cull as "haemorrhaging money", and the Dunedin City Council decided the business should be privatised. The new owners elected to retain the 'Citibus' naming, branding the Dunedin operation Passenger Transport Citibus, but decided to sell the Connexions business.

== Christchurch depot ==
The Christchurch depot was primarily a charter operation with a fleet of coaches for such purposes. It also operated tour and long-distance bus services to other cities of the South Island. Previously the company operated limited urban bus services in the city.

== Queenstown depot ==
Passenger Transport was the major operator of Ministry of Education school bus services in the Queenstown Lakes area for some years. It also operated charter services in the area as well as long-distance services to Christchurch under the nakedbus.com franchise.

== Tourism services ==
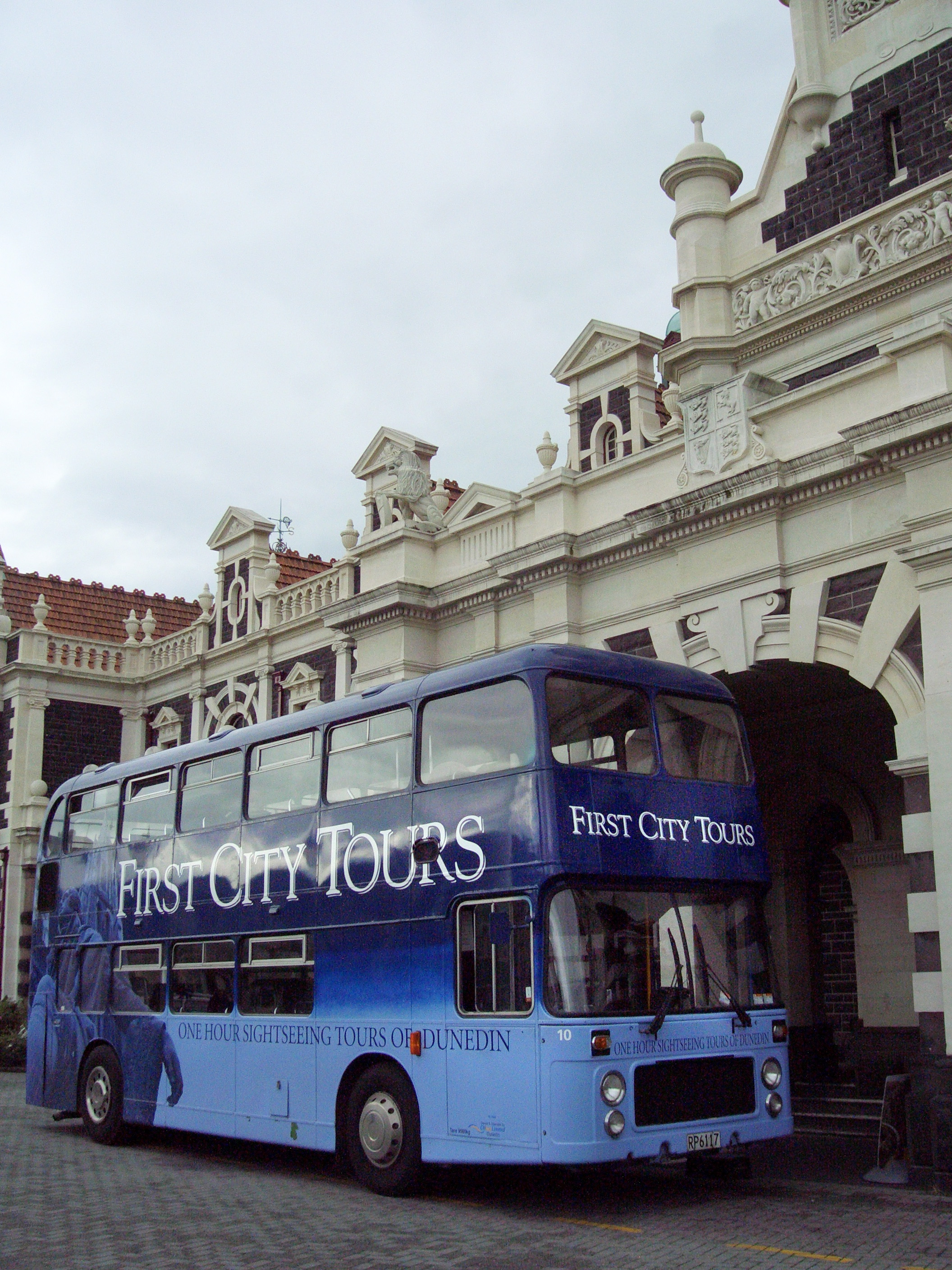
A Bristol double decker bus operated by PT Citibus's First City Tours providing sightseeing tours of Dunedin, at Dunedin Railway Station

Passenger Transport operated Tour coach services to package tour operators were provided under the Newtons brand and a double decker bus sightseeing tour around Dunedin under the brand First City Tours.

== Long distance services ==
Passenger Transport operated inter-city coach services as part of other franchise networks:

- Atomic
- Southern Link
- nakedbus.com

== Fleet history ==
Citibus and its predecessors operated Leyland vehicles for nearly 90 years before their last Leyland Leopard bus left service in 2011
