= Jack's Point =

Residential subdivision in Central Otago, New Zealand

- Town
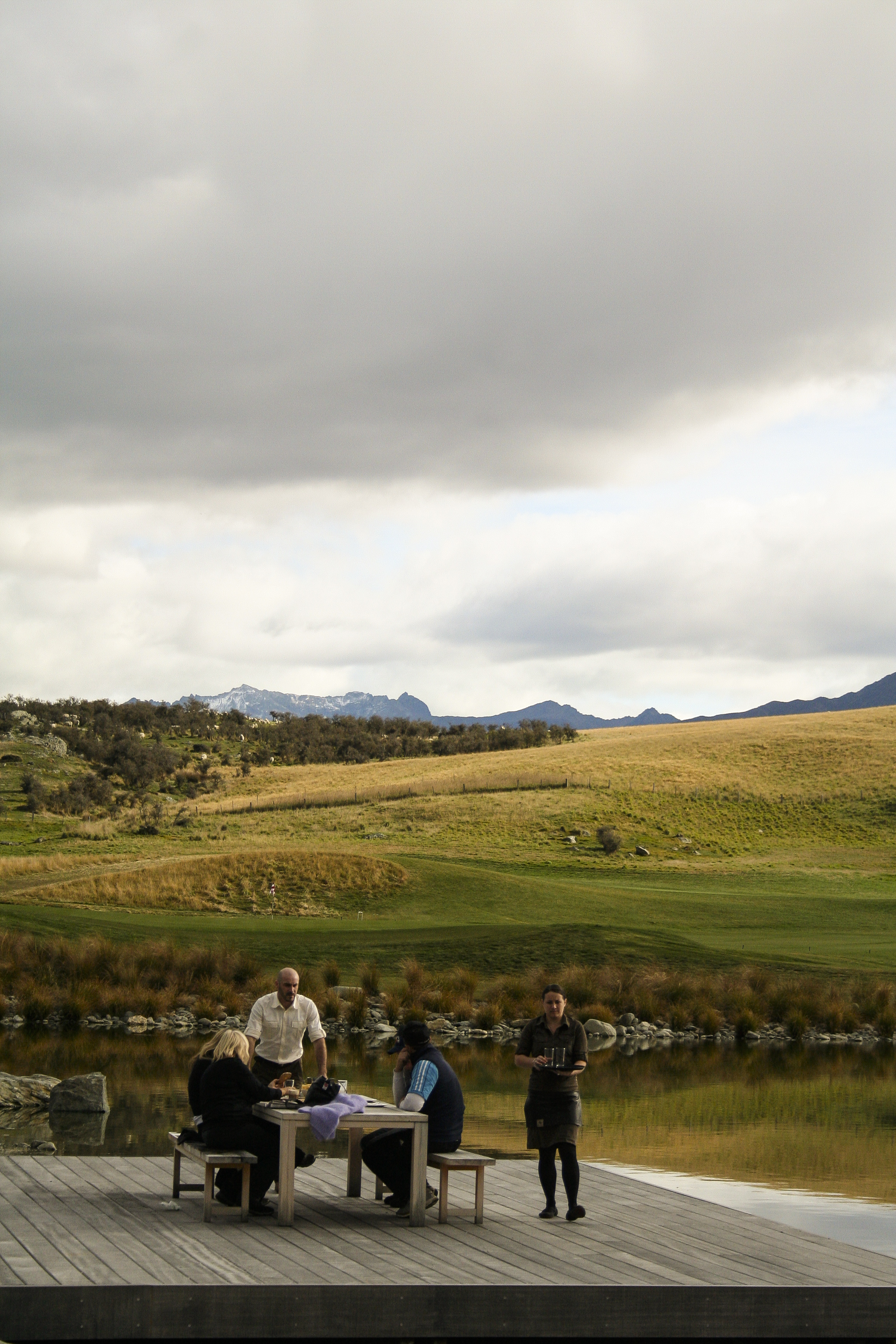
- Jack's Point and the manmade Lake Tewa
- Interactive map of Jack's Point
- Coordinates: 45.074471°S 168.740974°E
- Country: New Zealand
- Region: Otago
- Territorial authority: Queenstown-Lakes District
- Ward: Queenstown-Whakatipu Ward

Government
  - Local authority: Queenstown-Lakes District Council
  - Regional council: Otago Regional Council

Area
  - Total: 21.01 km^{2} (8.11 sq mi)

Population (June 2025)
  - Total: 5,500
  - Density: 260/km^{2} (680/sq mi)
- Time zone: UTC+12 (NZST)
  - Summer (DST): UTC+13 (NZDT)
- Area code: 03
- Local iwi: Ngāi Tahu

Jack's Point is a luxury estate in Central Otago, New Zealand, covering 1,200 hectares of land. It is located 6 km south of Queenstown, at the foot of The Remarkables and close to the edge of Lake Wakatipu. Developed by SEA Group (251.HK) with a master plan by Darby Partners, it is known for its golf course rated among the top 10 lifestyle estates in the world.

The settlement is a new development, planned to eventually consist of some 1300 houses and looking to serve a population of 7,000. It takes its name from "Maori Jack" Tewa, a local 19th century personality.

== Demographics ==
Jack's Point covers 21.01 km^{2} (8.11 sq mi) and had an estimated population of 5,500 as of June 2025, with a population density of 262 people per km^{2}.

Historical population
Year	Pop.	±% p.a.
2006	63	—
2013	237	+20.84%
2018	969	+32.53%

Before the 2023 census, Jack's Point had a smaller boundary, covering 14.48 km^{2} (5.59 sq mi). Using that boundary, Jacks Point had a population of 969 at the 2018 New Zealand census, an increase of 732 people (308.9%) since the 2013 census, and an increase of 906 people (1438.1%) since the 2006 census. There were 321 households, comprising 501 males and 468 females, giving a sex ratio of 1.07 males per female. The median age was 35.7 years (compared with 37.4 years nationally), with 270 people (27.9%) aged under 15 years, 126 (13.0%) aged 15 to 29, 510 (52.6%) aged 30 to 64, and 63 (6.5%) aged 65 or older.

Ethnicities were 91.0% European/Pākehā, 3.4% Māori, 1.2% Pasifika, 5.9% Asian, and 2.8% other ethnicities. People may identify with more than one ethnicity.

The percentage of people born overseas was 33.7, compared with 27.1% nationally.

Although some people chose not to answer the census's question about religious affiliation, 62.5% had no religion, 30.0% were Christian, 0.6% were Hindu, 0.3% were Muslim, 0.3% were Buddhist and 2.2% had other religions.

Of those at least 15 years old, 261 (37.3%) people had a bachelor's or higher degree, and 39 (5.6%) people had no formal qualifications. The median income was $59,100, compared with $31,800 nationally. 267 people (38.2%) earned over $70,000 compared to 17.2% nationally. The employment status of those at least 15 was that 438 (62.7%) people were employed full-time, 126 (18.0%) were part-time, and 6 (0.9%) were unemployed.

== Golf ==
The community's 18-hole, 6,388 metre golf course is situated along the Jack's Point ridge.

== Trails ==
Various trails, including a Grade 4 trail, are also available in the community.

== Wastewater Collection, Treatment and Reuse ==
Jacks Point has an Orenco Prelos (pressurised liquid only sewer) & Advantex wastewater treatment Plant. This system includes Prelos interceptor tanks on each property, pressure sewer network, Orenco AdvanTex rtPBR (recirculating textile packed bed reactor) wastewater treatment plant with advanced nutrient reduction, followed by UV disinfection and subsurface drip irrigation in the surrounding pastures. The system has been installed in stages - as the development phases are rolled out.
