= Leopard Coachlines =

New Zealand tour coach operator

- Locale: New Zealand
- Service area: Christchurch, Auckland
- Service type: Coach operator
- Fuel type: Diesel, Biodiesel
- Website: www.leopard.co.nz

Leopard Coachlines is a tour bus service operator based in Christchurch, New Zealand, with a depot in Auckland. It operates tourist coach trips, charter services to Mount Hutt ski field, and tours for schools and groups.

== Urban buses ==
From 1993 until mid 2013 it also ran many urban bus routes in Christchurch for Canterbury Regional Council. It received praise from the Energy Efficiency and Conservation Authority for being the first bus company in New Zealand to run its entire fleet on a five percent biodiesel blend; some buses run on a higher proportion of biodiesel, but also had two buses ordered off the road during a widely publicised vehicle check on buses, conducted by the New Zealand Police on 18 November 2010

In late July 2013 the urban bus operation was sold to Go Bus Transport.

== Fleet ==
As at May 2018, Leopard Coachlines operated 41 vehicles.
