= Dunedin North =

Suburb of Dunedin, New Zealand

- Suburb
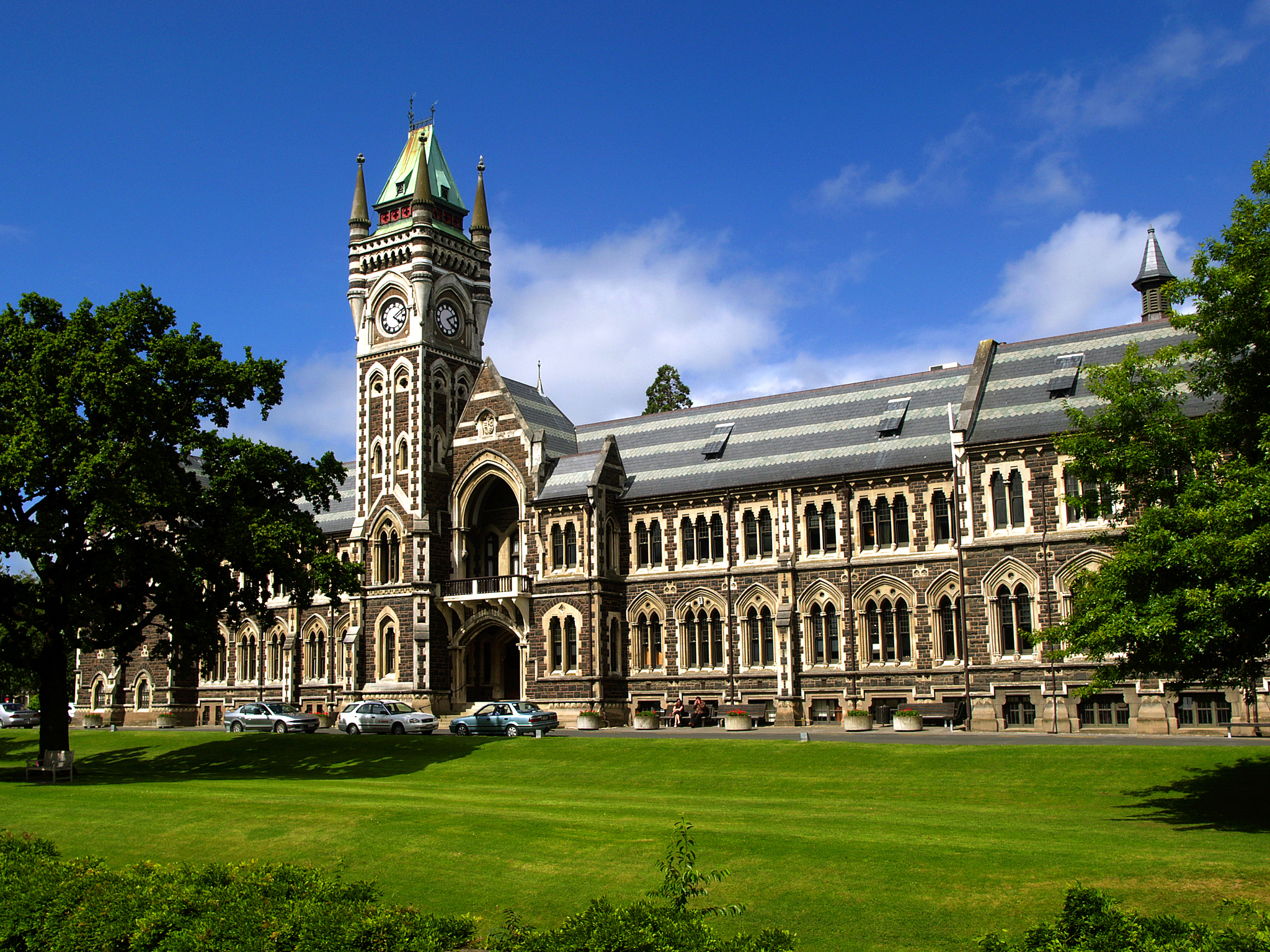
- University of Otago clocktower building
- Interactive map of Dunedin North
- Coordinates: 45.8636°S 170.5146°E
- Country: New Zealand
- City: Dunedin
- Local authority: Dunedin City Council

Area
  - Land: 140 ha (350 acres)

Population (June 2025)
  - Total: 6,590
  - Density: 4,700/km^{2} (12,000/sq mi)
- Hospitals: Dunedin Hospital

Maori Hill	Dalmore	Opoho
Roslyn	Dunedin North	Ravensbourne
City Rise	Central Dunedin	Dunedin Harbourside

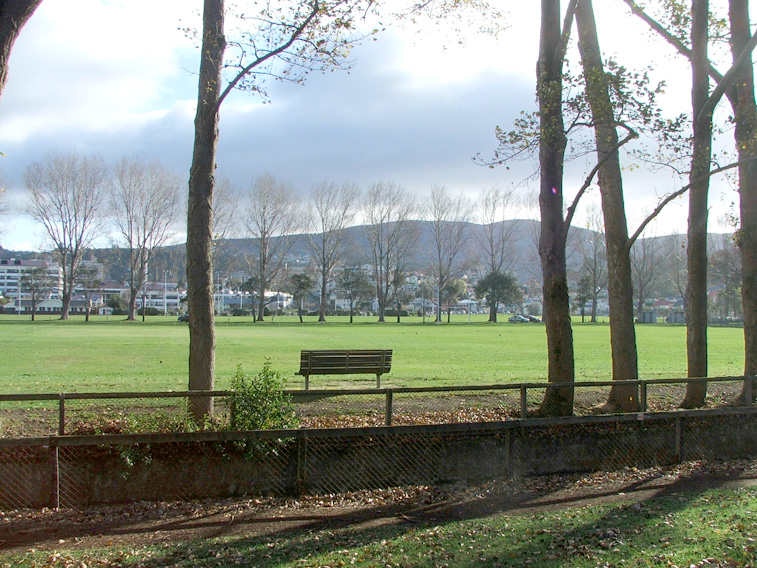
Logan Park

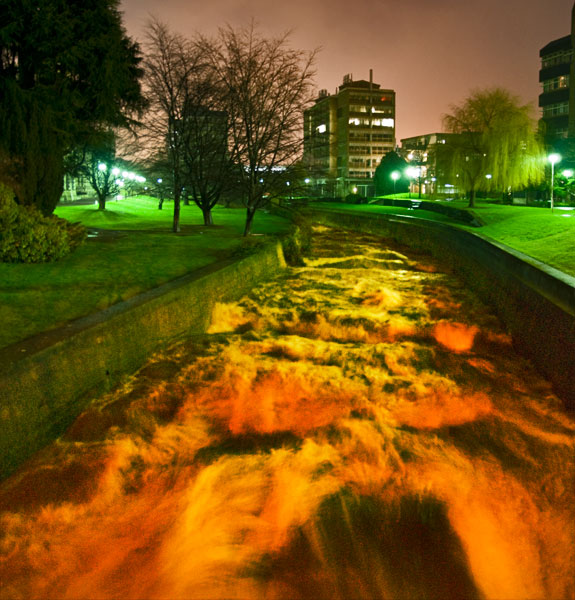
The Water of Leith flowing through the University of Otago after heavy rain

Dunedin North, also known as North Dunedin, is a major inner suburb of the New Zealand city of Dunedin, located 1.5 kilometres (0.93 mi) northeast of the city centre. It contains many of the city's major institutions, including the city's university, polytechnic, main hospital, and largest museum. Dunedin North's 2001 population was 7,047, including the university area.

== Geography ==
Dunedin North is located immediately to the north and northeast of the city's CBD. The suburb of Woodhaugh lies immediately to the northwest, and Dalmore and the Gardens Corner lie to the north. It is centred on a widening of the inner city plain around the lower reaches of the Water of Leith, and on land reclaimed from the Otago Harbour, including the former Pelichet Bay. The suburb is not entirely flat, however, as a spur of Signal Hill extends across the plain to the south of the Dunedin Botanic Gardens, rising into the small peak of Tani Hill immediately to the northeast of the University of Otago. The hill's name, not officially recognised and nowadays rarely used, is a corruption of "Botanic Hill", and dates from the time when the Dunedin Botanic Gardens were located on the site now occupied by the university. Two university halls of residence, Arana College and Studholme College, sit close to the peak of Tani Hill.

=== Main roads ===
Dunedin North's main streets include George Street, Castle Street, Cumberland Street, Great King Street, and Anzac Avenue. These latter four roads form part of New Zealand's State Highway network, with Castle, Cumberland, and Great King Streets all being part of State Highway 1 (as well as being part of the city's one-way street system), and Anzac Avenue being part of State Highway 88 between Dunedin and Port Chalmers. The first four of these streets run parallel to each other, and all five are connected by numerous cross streets such as Albany Street, Dundas Street, and Frederick Street in a grid pattern interrupted by the campus of the University of Otago.

=== University of Otago and environs ===
The University of Otago is the most notable feature of Dunedin North, covering 25 hectares (62 acres) of the suburb. Its central campus is roughly bounded by Cumberland Street, Albany Street, St. David's Street, and Clyde Street. Immediately to its east lies the Otago Polytechnic, and beyond this the University of Otago College of Education. Between this and the mouth of the Leith is the new Forsyth Barr Stadium at University Plaza, completed in 2011 on former industrial and warehousing land close to the edge of Otago Harbour.

Immediately to the north of the College of Education is a wide expanse of open parkland, Logan Park. This contains some of the city's other main sports grounds, notably the Caledonian Ground and the University Oval, the latter being a Test cricket venue. These grounds and the Forsyth Barr Stadium between them make this part of Dunedin one of the country's major sporting hubs. Logan Park High School, one of the city's larger high schools, is located close to the Caledonian Ground in the northeast corner of the park. The small Opoho Creek flows along the edge of Logan Park before its confluence with the Leith close to the latter's mouth. The mouth of the Leith is also the location of the Otago Yacht Club. At the eastern edge of Logan Park is the Logan Point quarry, which State Highway 88 skirts the edge of between Dunedin North and the neighbouring suburb of Ravensbourne.

=== Housing and other attractions ===
Beyond the institutional heart of the suburb, Dunedin North is primarily residential, with much of the area occupied by student flats. As such, Dunedin North and the neighbouring suburbs of The Gardens and North East Valley are often considered New Zealand's principal student ghetto. There is a tradition, since the late 1930s, of student flats being named by their residents. There is little in the way of industrial property within the suburb, although there is some light industry in the southeast close to Anzac Avenue, and Gregg's coffee factory is located close to Otago Polytechnic.

Other notable features of Dunedin North include Otago Museum, immediately to the east of the University, and Dunedin Hospital, which lies at the southern edge of Dunedin North surrounded by university buildings which are part of the Otago Medical School. The oldest church in Dunedin still used as a church is All Saints' Church, Dunedin built in 1865, it sits on Cumberland St opposite North Ground. One of the city's most architecturally important churches, Knox Church, sits to the west of the hospital at the point where North Dunedin joins the central business district. In the north of the suburb lies the Dunedin Botanic Gardens. Above them is one of the city's most historic cemeteries, the Dunedin Northern Cemetery.

== Demographics ==
Dunedin North covers 1.40 km^{2} (0.54 sq mi) and had an estimated population of 6,590 as of June 2025, with a population density of 4,707 people per km^{2}.

Historical population
Year	Pop.	±% p.a.
2006	6,312	—
2013	6,348	+0.08%
2018	6,294	−0.17%

Dunedin North had a population of 6,294 at the 2018 New Zealand census, a decrease of 54 people (−0.9%) since the 2013 census, and a decrease of 18 people (−0.3%) since the 2006 census. There were 1,191 households, comprising 2,493 males and 3,801 females, giving a sex ratio of 0.66 males per female, with 57 people (0.9%) aged under 15 years, 5,907 (93.9%) aged 15 to 29, 282 (4.5%) aged 30 to 64, and 51 (0.8%) aged 65 or older.

Ethnicities were 72.3% European/Pākehā, 10.0% Māori, 4.5% Pasifika, 22.0% Asian, and 2.8% other ethnicities. People may identify with more than one ethnicity.

The percentage of people born overseas was 31.6, compared with 27.1% nationally.

Although some people chose not to answer the census's question about religious affiliation, 59.0% had no religion, 26.9% were Christian, 0.2% had Māori religious beliefs, 1.9% were Hindu, 2.5% were Muslim, 2.0% were Buddhist and 3.5% had other religions.

Of those at least 15 years old, 795 (12.7%) people had a bachelor's or higher degree, and 51 (0.8%) people had no formal qualifications. 81 people (1.3%) earned over $70,000 compared to 17.2% nationally. The employment status of those at least 15 was that 594 (9.5%) people were employed full-time, 1,350 (21.6%) were part-time, and 549 (8.8%) were unemployed.

Individual statistical areas
Name	Area (km^{2})	Population	Density (per km^{2})	Households	Median age	Median income
Campus West	0.32	1,728	5,400	426	20.6 years	$7,400
Campus North	0.61	2,535	6,810	345	19.5 years	$4,600
Campus South	0.47	2,031	4,321	420	20.7 years	$6,900
New Zealand					37.4 years	$31,800

== Education ==
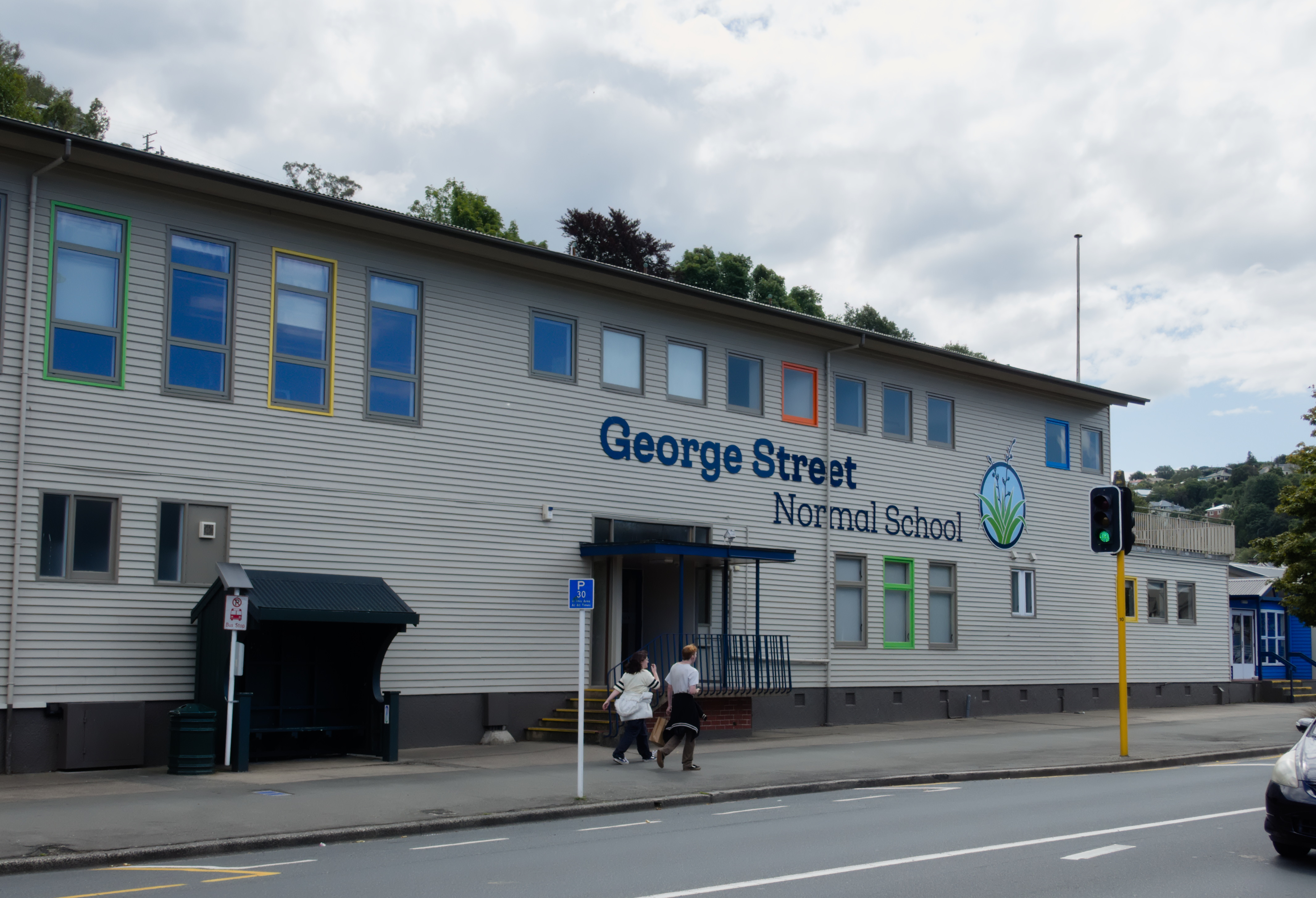
George Street Normal School

George Street Normal School is a state contributing primary school serving years 1 to 6 with a roll of 371 students. The school started in 1880.

Dunedin North Intermediate is a state intermediate school serving years 7 to 8 with a roll of 279 students. It opened in 1934.

Logan Park High School is a state secondary school serving years 9 to 13 with a roll of 1,059 students. It was founded in 1974 when King Edward Technical College split to form Logan Park and Otago Polytechnic.

All these schools are coeducational. Rolls are as of March 2026.
