= Pine Hill, New Zealand =

Suburb of Dunedin, New Zealand

Pine Hill
- Suburb
- Interactive map of Pine Hill
- Coordinates: 45.8414°S 170.5196°E
- Country: New Zealand
- City: Dunedin
- Local authority: Dunedin City Council

Area
  - Land: 118 ha (290 acres)

Population (June 2025)
  - Total: 2,340
  - Density: 1,980/km^{2} (5,140/sq mi)

Glenleith	Pine Hill
Maori Hill		North East Valley

Pine Hill is a suburb, hill, and general area of the New Zealand city of Dunedin. It is sited on the hill of the same name, a spur of Mount Cargill overlooking North East Valley and Glenleith 4 kilometres (2.5 mi) to the north of the city centre. This spur lies in the fork of the confluence of the Water of Leith and its largest tributary, the Lindsay Creek. The term Pine Hill is used generally to refer to a group of suburbs which lie on the hill's slopes: Pine Hill suburb itself, which sits on the upper slopes of the spur, and also two other suburbs which lie on the lower slopes, Dalmore and Liberton.

== Dalmore ==
Of the suburbs on Pine Hill, Dalmore is the oldest and also the southernmost, lying close to The Gardens, a suburb and shopping precinct at the mouth of North East Valley close to the Dunedin Botanic Gardens for which it is named. Dalmore lies on the steep slopes immediately to the northwest of The Gardens and north of the northern end of George Street, arguably the city's main street. The suburb is connected with Dunedin's CBD by way of two streets – the narrow and winding Gladstone Road, and the Pine Hill Extension. This latter route forms the lower part of Pine Hill Road and also part of State Highway 1. This winds up the steep flanks of Dalmore above the valley of the Water of Leith before a tricky junction which connects the extension with the upper part of Pine Hill Road and the Dunedin Northern Motorway.

== Liberton ==
Liberton is largely made up of post-World War II state housing. As with many other Dunedin suburbs, it is named for a suburb of Edinburgh, Scotland.

Liberton lies immediately above Dalmore, on a series of avenues and crescents which branch from Pine Hill Road. A tiny arcade of shops lies at the end of Dalmore and beginning of Liberton, but other than this the suburb is entirely residential. Pine Hill School, the area's main primary school, lies in Liberton, as does Liberton Christian School, Dunedin's first special-character Protestant primary school. Other than road connections with Dalmore and Pine Hill, the only road connecting Liberton with Dunedin's other suburbs is a steep and winding connection with Buccleugh Street, North East Valley. At one time there were plans to create a subdivision linking Liberton with Selwyn Street, North East Valley, but these never came to fruition.

== The upper slopes ==
Beyond Pine Hill School lies the suburb of Pine Hill itself. In its lower reaches, it is suburban residential in nature, but in the upper reaches it becomes semi-rural, with farmlets and farms as some of the properties closer to the top of Pine Hill Road and Campbells Road, the only other road of any great length in the suburb. From Campbells Road, there are views across North East Valley and Normanby to the suburb of Opoho and the summit of Signal Hill, 2.5 kilometres (1.6 mi) to the east. The upper section of Pine Hill around Campbells Road is occasionally referred to as Pine Heights, but not recognised by the Dunedin City Council, or maps, and has no separate postcode. The term is commonly used by people living in houses on the hill, in what used to be farmland, to separate themselves from the state house-dominated lower suburbs.

Pine Hill Road continues to climb into rural land above the top of the suburb, connecting with Maxwellton Street, a narrow rural road which crosses a bridge over the Dunedin Northern Motorway before connecting with Patmos Avenue in the suburb of Glenleith. Pine Hill Road terminates in a junction with Cowan Road, a steep rural road which climbs to the summit of Mount Cargill, and which is the service road for the television transmitter station on its summit. As such, Cowan Road is the highest road close to Dunedin's main urban area.

Other than Pine Hill School, the major landmarks within the area are the early 1950s Aquinas College, a University of Otago hall of residence on the slopes of Dalmore, and the impressive Santa Sabina Convent building, which lies close to the top of Buccleugh Street between Liberton and North East Valley. This building is surrounded by a recent controversial housing complex.

== Demographics ==
Pine Hill-Dalmore statistical area covers 1.18 km^{2} (0.46 sq mi) and had an estimated population of 2,340 as of June 2025, with a population density of 1,983 people per km^{2}.

Historical population
Year	Pop.	±% p.a.
2006	2,340	—
2013	2,226	−0.71%
2018	2,289	+0.56%

Pine Hill-Dalmore had a population of 2,289 at the 2018 New Zealand census, an increase of 63 people (2.8%) since the 2013 census, and a decrease of 51 people (−2.2%) since the 2006 census. There were 882 households, comprising 1,134 males and 1,155 females, giving a sex ratio of 0.98 males per female. The median age was 33.2 years (compared with 37.4 years nationally), with 420 people (18.3%) aged under 15 years, 600 (26.2%) aged 15 to 29, 987 (43.1%) aged 30 to 64, and 285 (12.5%) aged 65 or older.

Ethnicities were 85.6% European/Pākehā, 10.2% Māori, 4.8% Pasifika, 8.7% Asian, and 4.1% other ethnicities. People may identify with more than one ethnicity.

The percentage of people born overseas was 22.7, compared with 27.1% nationally.

Although some people chose not to answer the census's question about religious affiliation, 57.0% had no religion, 28.8% were Christian, 0.3% had Māori religious beliefs, 0.7% were Hindu, 1.7% were Muslim, 0.7% were Buddhist and 2.9% had other religions.

Of those at least 15 years old, 543 (29.1%) people had a bachelor's or higher degree, and 264 (14.1%) people had no formal qualifications. The median income was $24,100, compared with $31,800 nationally. 195 people (10.4%) earned over $70,000 compared to 17.2% nationally. The employment status of those at least 15 was that 795 (42.5%) people were employed full-time, 315 (16.9%) were part-time, and 99 (5.3%) were unemployed.

== Education ==
Pine Hill School is a state contributing primary school for Year 1 to 6 students, with a roll of 48 students. The school started in 1872.

Liberton Christian School is a state-integrated full primary school for Year 1 to 8 students, with a roll of 129 students. It first opened in 1982 and became state-integrated in 1999.

Both these schools are co-educational. Rolls are as of March 2026.
