= Opoho =

Suburb of Dunedin, New Zealand

Ōpoho
- Suburb
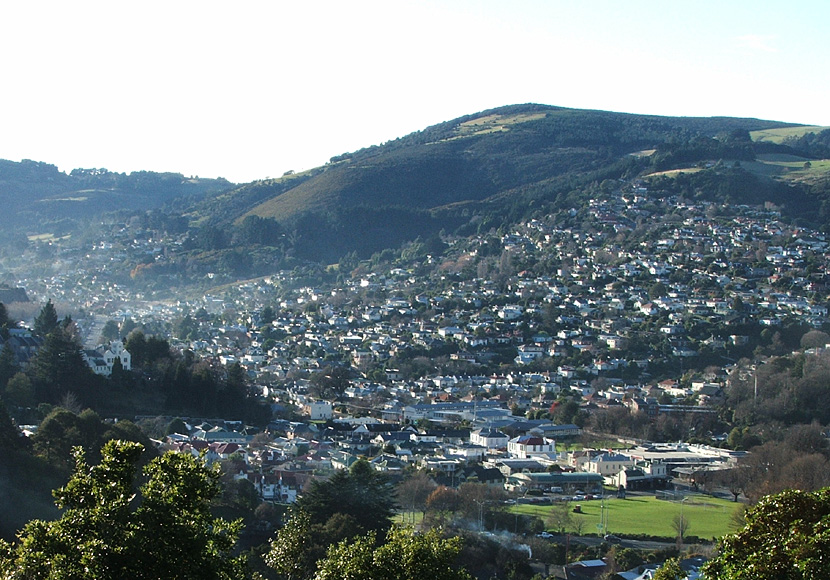
- Looking across the Gardens Corner at the mouth of North East Valley towards Ōpoho from Prospect Park
- Interactive map of Ōpoho
- Country: New Zealand
- City: Dunedin
- Local authority: Dunedin City Council

Area
  - Land: 236 ha (580 acres)

Population (June 2025)
  - Total: 1,230
  - Density: 521/km^{2} (1,350/sq mi)

| North East Valley | Normanby |
| The Gardens | Ōpoho | St Leonards |
| Dunedin North | Dunedin Harbourside | Ravensbourne |

Ōpoho is a suburb of the New Zealand city of Dunedin. It sits on the western flank of Signal Hill, 3 kilometres (1.9 mi) to the northeast of the city centre, overlooking North East Valley and the Dunedin Botanic Gardens.

== Etymology ==
Ōpoho takes its name from the small stream, Ōpoho Creek (also known as Stony Creek). This stream runs south along the western flank of Signal Hill, past Logan Park High School in Dunedin North, before being diverted through culverts and flowing into the Water of Leith close to it outflow into the Otago Harbour. Ōpoho is a Māori word, simply meaning "The place of Poho", Poho being an 18th-century Ngāti Wairua chief who lived close to the stream's outflow, which at that time was into Pelichet Bay (the bay has since been reclaimed and is now part of Logan Park).

== History ==
The first European settlers in the area were farmers, and the suburb remained semi-rural until the 1940s. There are still some farms close to the top of Signal Hill Road, though much of the top of Signal Hill is now a scenic reserve, Burns Park. Early farmers in the area included John Switzer, John Broome, and John Black. The area was at first administered by the Signal Hill Roads Board, which became part of the new North East Valley municipality in 1877. This amalgamated with the city of Dunedin in 1910.

As with many parts of Dunedin, Ōpoho was initially composed of many smaller named townships, the names of some of which are still used by local residents. In 1873, the first residential subdivision of Ōpoho began with Ōpoho Township (the area south of Blacks Road), followed soon after by Maybank Township immediately to the north and, later, by Grandview Township, to the north of Maybank (the names of Maybank and Grandview survive in two of Ōpoho's streets). By the 1890s, most of the subdivisions of Ōpoho Township were occupied and Maybank was growing. Grandview was developed during the 1920s. Other township names occasionally encountered include St James' Park, a small area including Grey Street and James Streets on the lower slopes between Ōpoho and North East Valley.

== Geography ==
Ōpoho's is largely concentrated around two long streets, Evans Street and Signal Hill Road, which run across the flanks of Signal Hill. Signal Hill Road continues to wind up to the Centennial memorial close to the hill's summit. The memorial was built to mark the centenary of New Zealand in 1940. Impressive views over the city can be gained from here.

Several steep streets connect Evans Street and Signal Hill Road or descend to North Road in North East Valley. Chief among these last are Blacks Road and Ōpoho Road, the latter of which is the main route to and from the suburb. This road runs along the northern edge of Dunedin Botanic Gardens and connects with Dunedin's main arterial streets at the Gardens Corner. A further street, Lovelock Avenue (named for Dunedin Olympic gold medallist Jack Lovelock), winds through the upper reaches of the Botanic Gardens, emerging close to the University of Otago in Dunedin North.

The suburb of Ōpoho has numerous prominent landmarks, most prominently the Botanic Garden and Centennial Monument. Other landmarks of note include the Northern Cemetery, which occupies a low spur of Signal Hill on Lovelock Avenue, next to the Botanic Gardens and above Logan Park. One of Dunedin's earliest cemeteries (begun in 1872), many of Dunedin's notable early citizens are buried here, among them William Larnach and Thomas Bracken. Larnach's Gothic mausoleum is the most prominent structure in the cemetery, which commands impressive views across central Dunedin.

Also of note are two university halls of residence that lie close to the southern end of Ōpoho. Knox College is a prominent towered red brick building on the lower slopes. Established as a theological hall in 1907, Knox is still a centre of the University of Otago's religious studies courses. Below this hall, close to the Gardens Corner, lies the smaller Salmond College, built in 1971. The suburb also contains the Dunedin branch of the Society for the Prevention of Cruelty to Animals, and Tannock Glen, a public gardens which is notable for its rhododendrons. Sports clubs based in the suburb include the Alhambra Union Rugby Club, based at Ōpoho Park at the junction of Ōpoho Road and Lovelock Avenue.

Numerous walking tracks cross the Botanic Gardens, Signal Hill, and the slopes between. These include a track across the summit of Signal Hill to link up with Cleghorn Street above the northern end of North East Valley, and tracks connecting the Centennial Memorial with Logan Park and the harbourside suburb of Ravensbourne.

== Notable residents ==
Noted Ōpoho residents have included artist Arthur Merric Boyd, athlete Jack Lovelock, Dorothea Horsman, Lloyd Geering, celebrity chef Alison Holst, opera singer Patricia Payne and former All Black Kees Meeuws.

== Demographics ==
Ōpoho is one of Dunedin's more prestigious residential suburbs however still has somewhat mixed demographics, containing student flats, significant numbers of elderly citizens, and the houses of many in the academic community. There were several shops and once a hotel in the southern part of Signal Hill Road, but these are long gone.

Ōpoho covers 2.36 km^{2} (0.91 sq mi) and had an estimated population of 1,230 as of June 2025, with a population density of 521 people per km^{2}.

Historical population
| Year | Pop. | ±% p.a. |
|---|---|---|
| 2006 | 1,236 | — |
| 2013 | 1,200 | −0.42% |
| 2018 | 1,218 | +0.30% |

Ōpoho had a population of 1,218 at the 2018 New Zealand census, an increase of 18 people (1.5%) since the 2013 census, and a decrease of 18 people (−1.5%) since the 2006 census. There were 480 households, comprising 588 males and 633 females, giving a sex ratio of 0.93 males per female. The median age was 38.5 years (compared with 37.4 years nationally), with 216 people (17.7%) aged under 15 years, 270 (22.2%) aged 15 to 29, 561 (46.1%) aged 30 to 64, and 174 (14.3%) aged 65 or older.

Ethnicities were 89.7% European/Pākehā, 7.9% Māori, 1.7% Pasifika, 6.9% Asian, and 2.7% other ethnicities. People may identify with more than one ethnicity.

The percentage of people born overseas was 24.1, compared with 27.1% nationally.

Although some people chose not to answer the census's question about religious affiliation, 57.1% had no religion, 31.8% were Christian, 0.2% had Māori religious beliefs, 0.5% were Hindu, 0.7% were Muslim, 1.2% were Buddhist and 3.2% had other religions.

Of those at least 15 years old, 561 (56.0%) people had a bachelor's or higher degree, and 66 (6.6%) people had no formal qualifications. The median income was $34,400, compared with $31,800 nationally. 240 people (24.0%) earned over $70,000 compared to 17.2% nationally. The employment status of those at least 15 was that 480 (47.9%) people were employed full-time, 177 (17.7%) were part-time, and 48 (4.8%) were unemployed.

== Education ==
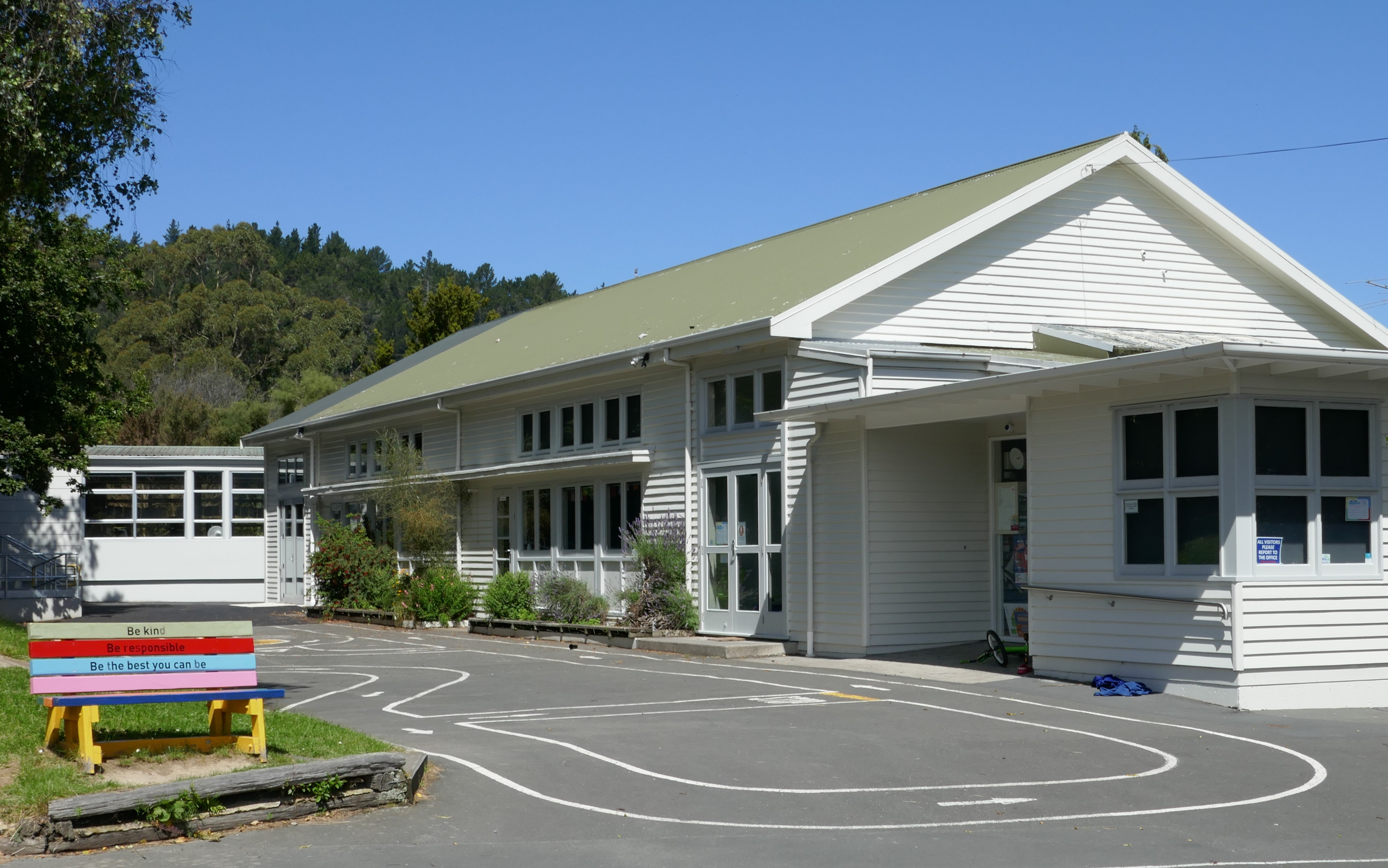
Ōpoho School main building

Ōpoho School (Te Kura o Ōpoho) is a state contributing primary school serving years 1 to 6 with a roll of 121 students as of July 2026. The school was founded in 1938.
