= Bethune's Gully =

Coordinates: 45.832948°S 170.551646°E

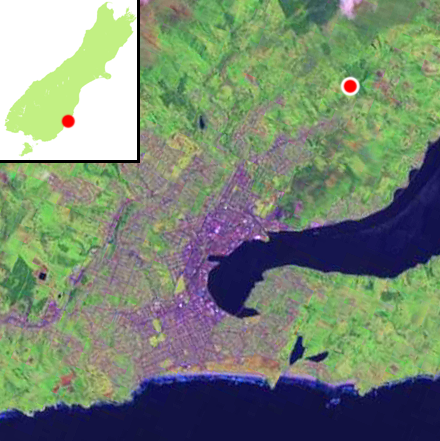
The location of Bethune's Gully within Dunedin's urban area

Bethune's Gully is a notable geological feature of northern Dunedin, in the South Island of New Zealand. It is located close to the suburb of Normanby towards the northern end of North East Valley. It preserves a number of acres of very old-growth forest and a large stand of exotic Douglas fir, and is an ecosystem directly below the cloud forest on the upper slopes of Mount Cargill. The gully was formed by the upper reaches of Lindsay Creek, a tributary of the Water of Leith which flows along North East Valley.

The gully is surrounded by an 86-hectare (210-acre) reserve and recreational area at the start of walking and trail-biking tracks which lead up the slopes of Mount Cargill, 2.5 kilometres (1.6 mi) to the north. The most notable of these is a 2-hour round trip walk which leads to the Cargill's summit, a rise of 580 metres (1,900 ft), which was opened in 1981.

In 1996 Bethune's Gully was the venue for the New Zealand national mountain-biking championships. Biking tracks were extended after the championships and were opened to the public in 2003. Nearby Forrester Park, on Norwood Street, is home to the city's main BMX circuit.

The reserve was named for David Bethune, who took over the property in 1878, setting up a sawmill and brick kiln. The property fell into disuse after it was sold by Bethune, only to be redeveloped by J. B. Thompson immediately after World War I and leased to the Dunedin City Council. It became city property after Thompson's death in 1955.

The Gully is reached by Cluny Street, a short paved road off Normanby's Norwood Street, beyond which Norwood Street passes through a narrow cutting before emerging in open countryside.
