= Chingford Stables =

Coordinates: 45.84298°S 170.53645°E

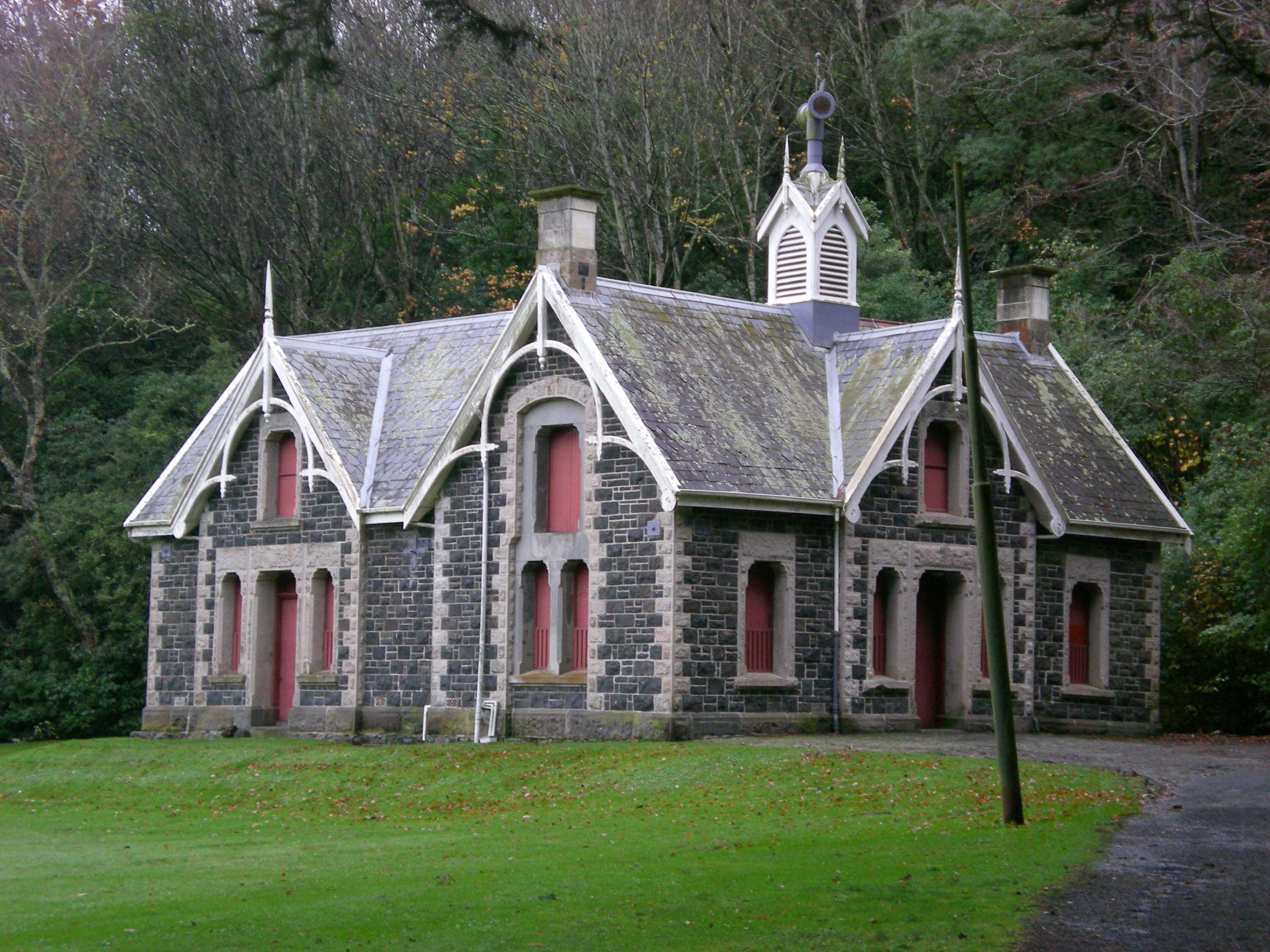
Chingford Stables, May 2008.

The Chingford Stables are located in North East Valley, Dunedin, New Zealand. The stables are now used for both private and public functions, and listed as a Category I Historic Place.

== History ==
The stables were built for P.C. Neill in the early 1870s. P.C Neill was a prominent Dunedin merchant, and was the French consul during the 1890s. Neill bought the stable along with the estate, which included a homestead located near the stables, from a Doctor Andrew Buchanan, in the 1860s. The stables housed Dunedin's business men's horses. The building is constructed of basalt. The stables no longer houses horses but is used as a venue for public and prestigious private events.

== Location ==
The stables are located in Chingford Park which is named after a U.K. based property owned by the parks first owner, Doctor Andrew Buchanan, who bought the land and formed an estate in the 1860s. Chingford Park hosts the Leith Valley Harrier Club, the Dunedin Archery Club, a children's playground, and a permanent orienteering course. This area was once Neill's property. Lindsay Creek, a small stream which runs the length of North East Valley, runs through the park.
