= Salmond College =

College in Dunedin, New Zealand

Coordinates: 45.854357°S 170.522372°E

- University of Otago
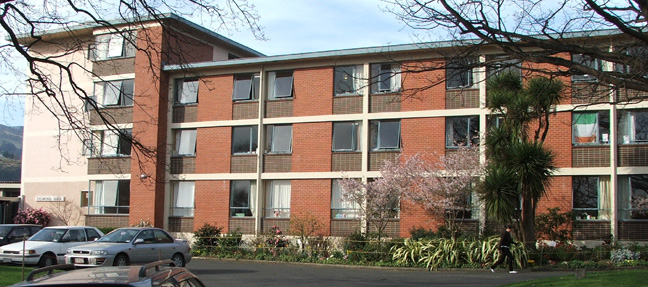

- Salmond College Coat of Arms
- Location: Knox St
- Motto: Gratia et Veritas (Latin)
- Motto in English: Grace and Truth
- Founders: The Council of Knox College and Salmond College
- Established: 1971
- Status: Affiliated
- Head: Nick Bates
- Undergraduates: up to 238
- Website: salmondcollege.ac.nz

Salmond College is a residential college affiliated with the University of Otago in Dunedin, New Zealand. As an affiliated college, it is privately owned and is run independently from the university, being governed by The Council of Knox College and Salmond College, a body with links to the Presbyterian Church of Aotearoa New Zealand. The college opened in 1971 as Salmond Hall, originally to accommodate women students, to parallel the male-only facility Knox College. It became a coeducational facility during the 1970s. The name changed to Salmond College in 2006.

Salmond and Knox share different parts of the same 4.57 hectare landscaped site (11 acres), located on the north side of the Dunedin Botanic Gardens, close to the area known simply as The Gardens Corner at the foot of North East Valley, approximately 15 minutes walk north of the campus. The site, originally the location for stables for Ross and Glendining Limited, was donated by the Ross family.

The college predominantly provides for first-year students, with 20 to 30 returning for a second year.

The college's name commemorates James Salmond (for many years a lecturer at Knox Theological Hall) and his sister Mary Salmond (Principal of the Presbyterian Church's Deaconess Training School in the 1950s).

The majority of students are housed in single rooms on one of the four levels in the main building. Kaiāwhina Whare are the College Residential Leaders—they are senior students who live on site and mentor and support the first-year residents. The Head and both Deputy Heads of college reside on the premises.

Facilities include a gym, computing facilities, tutorial rooms, a library, television/recreation areas, a dining hall, a chapel, car parking, and secure cycle storage.

Salmond's motto, as it appears in the college crest, is 'Gratia et Veritas', or 'Grace and Truth'. At the end of 2020 a whakatauākī was confirmed as a part of the mission-statement for the college: Ko te toa i a tini, i a mano o te takata - It is the bravery of a multitude, of thousands of people. This Ngāi Tahu whakatauākī, attributed to Tū Whakauika and Te Oreorehua, refers to the strength of collectivity. Salmond entered its 50th year in 2021.
