= North East Valley =

Suburb of Dunedin, New Zealand

- Suburb
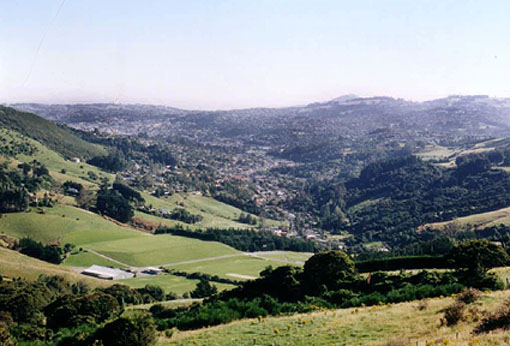
- Interactive map of North East Valley
- Coordinates: 45.853°S 170.522°E
- Country: New Zealand
- City: Dunedin
- Local authority: Dunedin City Council

Area
  - Land: 468 ha (1,160 acres)

Population (June 2025)
  - Total: 9,660
  - Density: 2,060/km^{2} (5,350/sq mi)

Pine Hill
Maori Hill	North East Valley
	Dunedin North	Opoho

North East Valley (sometimes spelled Northeast Valley, and often abbreviated to NEV) is a suburb of the New Zealand city of Dunedin.

== Geography ==
North East Valley sits in the valley of the Lindsay Creek, a tributary of the Water of Leith and on the flanking slopes of Pine Hill and Signal Hill, 3 kilometres (1.9 mi) to the northeast of the city centre.

North East Valley is a residential suburb, and is home to a mix of older residents and students from the city's tertiary institutions (the University of Otago and Otago Polytechnic, which lie 1 kilometre (0.62 mi) to the south, beyond the Dunedin Botanic Gardens. The suburb mainly consists of one long street, North Road, and numerous perpendicular side roads which branch off of it, many of which – especially on the eastern (Signal Hill) side – are notoriously steep. One of these, Baldwin Street, is reputedly the world's steepest street. Other than North Road, the suburb's main roads include Blacks Road (which links with the hillside suburb of Opoho) and Norwood Street.

North East Valley was a separate borough until 1910, when it was amalgamated with the city of Dunedin.

== The Gardens, Normanby, and Mount Mera ==
The term North East Valley is often used to encompass four smaller suburbs within the valley, but more specifically refers to only one, which stretches from approximately Chambers Street north to Chingford Park. Beyond this are two smaller residential areas, Normanby and Mount Mera, and the area below Chambers Street is often simply referred to as The Gardens or The Gardens Corner (after the nearby Dunedin Botanic Gardens).

Normanby is the name of the northern end of North East Valley, at which point Dunedin's urban area gives way to open countryside. The land here is steeply sloping, as it is the foothills of Mount Cargill. The slopes of Mount Cargill itself are densely wooded, and are crisscrossed with walking tracks, some of which start at the Bethune's Gully reserve, at the northern end of Normanby. Mount Mera is an area of state housing sitting on the north facing side of the valley, just above Normanby.

== North Road ==
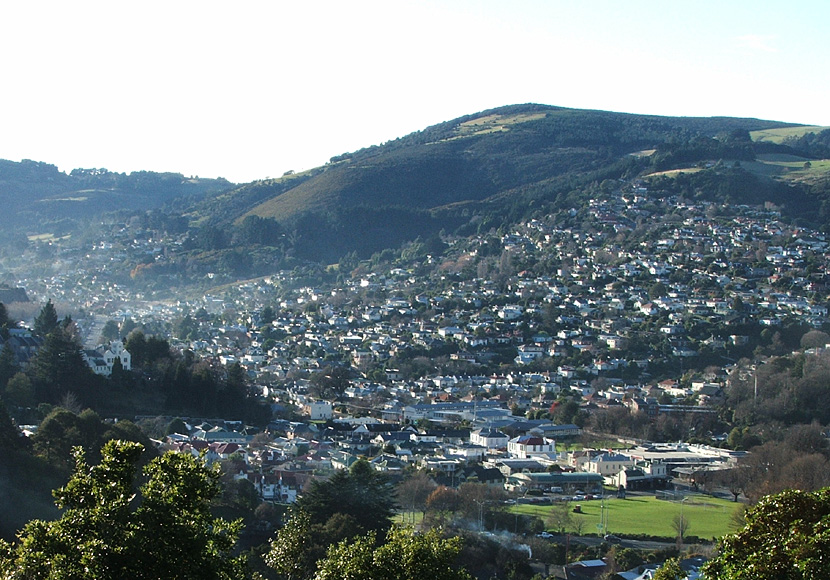
Looking across the Gardens Corner at the mouth of the valley towards Opoho from Prospect Park. The Gardens Ground is clearly visible at the lower right.

North Road, originally the main road north out of Dunedin, starts at the Gardens Corner, where it links with Opoho Road and Bank Street (which links with the northern end of Dunedin's main street, George Street). A sports ground at this corner (the Gardens Ground) is the site of cricket and football pitches, and beyond this ground is the southern end of the Dunedin Northern Motorway, part of State Highway 1. The Gardens Ground is the home ground of Northern Football Club and North East Valley Cricket Club.

From the Gardens Corner, North Road runs relatively straight for 2 kilometres (1.2 mi), crossing the Lindsay Creek and continuing to the northeast. Blacks Road, a steep connection to the suburb of Opoho, branches off North Road close to the valley's widest point. Past Chingford Park, the suburban part of the road ends at the junction with Norwood Street, and North Road starts to climb and wind around the end of the valley. From here, it runs through rural farmland, connecting with roads to Port Chalmers and Waitati. Until the construction of the Dunedin Northern Motorway this was a major route out of Dunedin to the north, but is now only lightly used.

== Landmarks ==
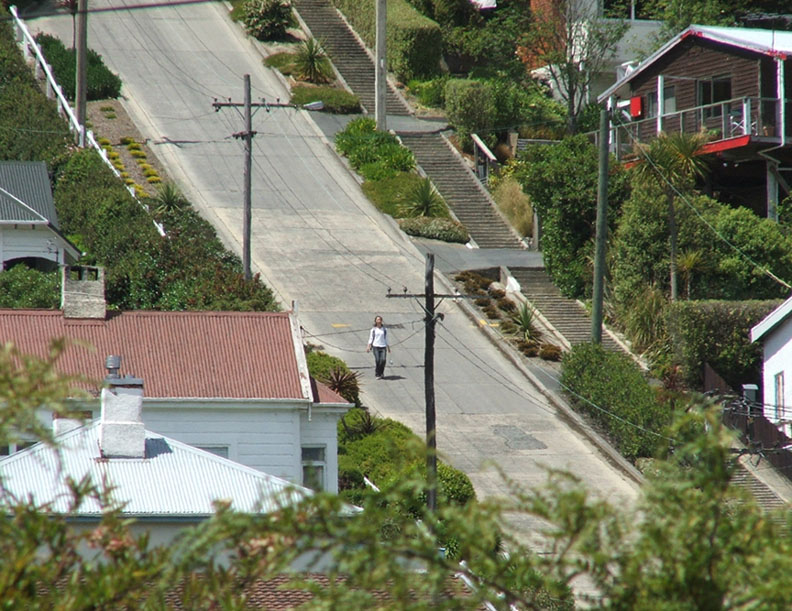
Baldwin Street, North East Valley – reputedly the world's steepest street.

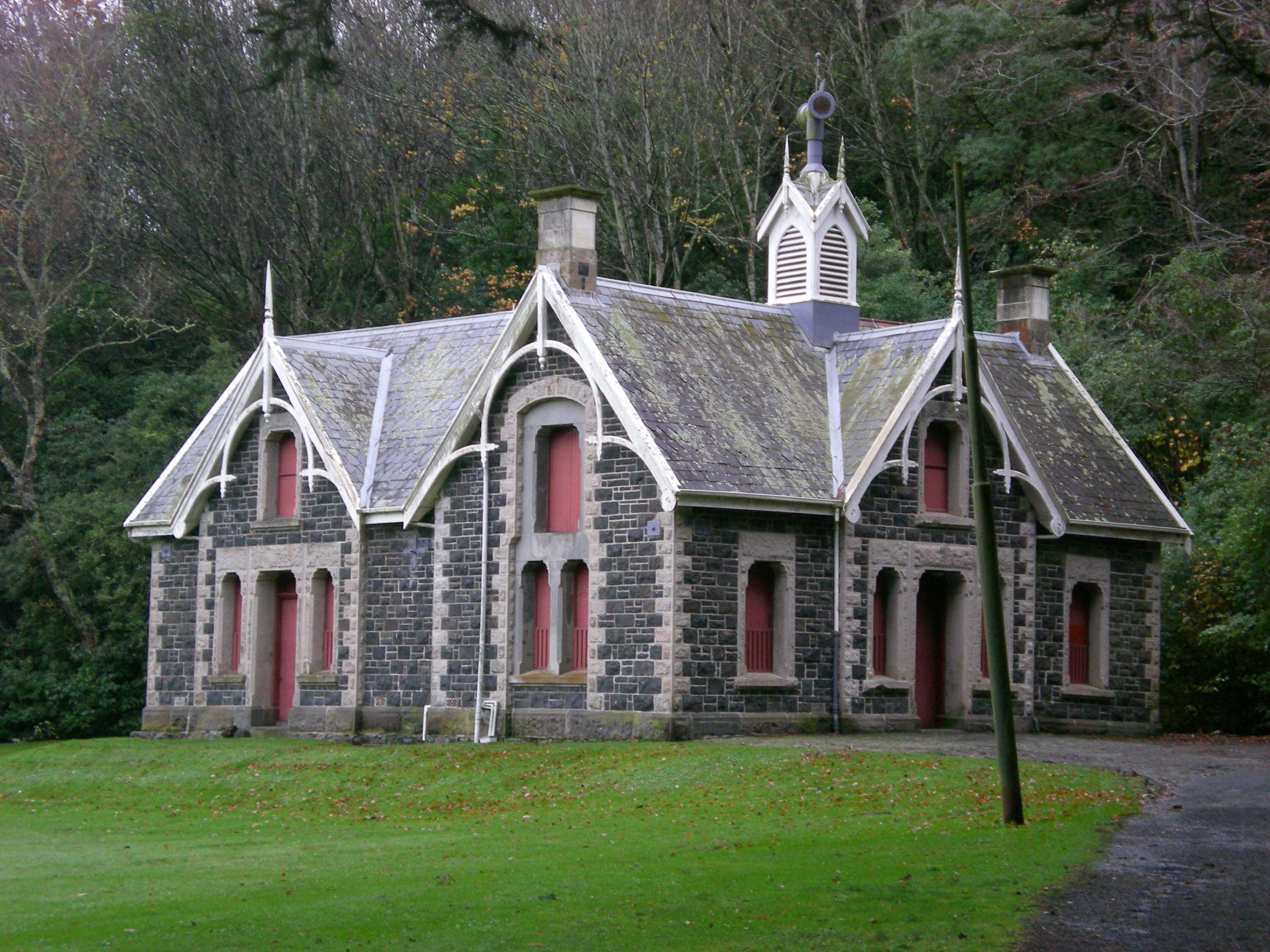
Chingford Stables.

Apart from Baldwin Street, North East Valley has several noted landmarks. Two university halls of residence, Knox College and Salmond College lie on the lower slopes to the east of the Gardens Corner, and another, Aquinas College lies on the lower slopes of Pine Hill immediately to the west. Close to this stands another prominent building, the former Santa Sabina Convent, which is visible from much of the northern central city. Another prominent building in the valley is Ross Home, one of the city's major retirement homes, which is located in North Road.

The suburb has several notable parks and gardens, among them Chingford Park, the Quarry Gardens, Forrester Park, and Bethune's Gully.

Chingford Park is a recreational reserve containing historic stone stables, located towards the northern end of North Road. It surrounded the no-longer extant Chingford House, which had been built in 1862. The property was built and landscaped in the 1870s and 1880s by businessman P.C. Neill (one of whose descendants is actor Sam Neill). Among improvements made by Neill to the property include the historic bluestone stables, built in 1880, which still stand as a centre for the park. Chingford Park is popular with walkers, and also contains soccer and cricket grounds, and the city's main archery club. Other notable features of the Park include several giant Macrocarpa trees which stand close to the banks of Lindsay Creek.

The Quarry Gardens are a park created from the former Palmer's Quarry, and are located on North Road directly opposite the bottom of Baldwin Street. The quarry was closed in 1980, and was thoroughly landscaped from 1989 into a terraced garden area. The amphitheatre of the old quarry pit has in the past been used as an outdoor music venue, especially during the late 1990s. Several walking tracks climb to the terraces of the former quarry, which have been extensively planted with many species, notably rhododendrons, and other walking paths follow the banks of the Lindsay Creek, connecting with Selwyn Street to the south and Watts road to the north. The gardens are privately owned, but are open to the public year-round.

Forrester Park is a sports ground at the end of Norwood Street. It contains football and rugby pitches and the city's BMX circuit, as well as a dog park and kennel club. Bethune's Gully is also accessed from Norwood Street. It is a secluded 86 hectares (210 acres) reserve which lies at the southernmost foothills of Mount Cargill, and is a popular scenic area. From here, walking tracks ascend the slopes of Cargill. The reserve was originally the site of sawmills and brick kilns operated by David Bethune in the 1880s, and became city council property in 1955.

== Demographics ==
North East Valley covers 4.68 km^{2} (1.81 sq mi) and had an estimated population of 9,660 as of June 2025, with a population density of 2,064 people per km^{2}.

Historical population
Year	Pop.	±% p.a.
2006	8,433	—
2013	8,658	+0.38%
2018	9,342	+1.53%

North East Valley had a population of 9,342 at the 2018 New Zealand census, an increase of 684 people (7.9%) since the 2013 census, and an increase of 909 people (10.8%) since the 2006 census. There were 2,757 households, comprising 4,398 males and 4,953 females, giving a sex ratio of 0.89 males per female, with 684 people (7.3%) aged under 15 years, 5,787 (61.9%) aged 15 to 29, 2,124 (22.7%) aged 30 to 64, and 744 (8.0%) aged 65 or older.

Ethnicities were 81.5% European/Pākehā, 10.2% Māori, 3.5% Pasifika, 12.4% Asian, and 3.4% other ethnicities. People may identify with more than one ethnicity.

The percentage of people born overseas was 26.4, compared with 27.1% nationally.

Although some people chose not to answer the census's question about religious affiliation, 58.3% had no religion, 27.1% were Christian, 0.2% had Māori religious beliefs, 1.4% were Hindu, 2.0% were Muslim, 1.3% were Buddhist and 4.3% had other religions.

Of those at least 15 years old, 2,013 (23.3%) people had a bachelor's or higher degree, and 576 (6.7%) people had no formal qualifications. 405 people (4.7%) earned over $70,000 compared to 17.2% nationally. The employment status of those at least 15 was that 2,118 (24.5%) people were employed full-time, 1,893 (21.9%) were part-time, and 717 (8.3%) were unemployed.

North East Valley Knox and Gardens (Dunedin City) are part of the student quarter for students attending Dunedin's main tertiary institutions, the University of Otago and Otago Polytechnic, which lie around 2000 metres to the south. As such, the median age and median income of these areas are significantly lower than those of the city as a whole.

Individual statistical areas
Name	Area (km^{2})	Population	Density (per km^{2})	Households	Median age	Median income
Normanby	1.42	1,425	1,004	528	43.7 years	$25,200
North East Valley Chingford	1.08	1,653	1,531	633	31.8 years	$23,100
North East Valley Knox	0.67	2,523	3,766	729	22.2 years	$13,000
Gardens (Dunedin City)	1.51	3,741	2,477	867	20.3 years	$7,100
New Zealand					37.4 years	$31,800

== Education ==
North East Valley Normal School is a state contributing primary school serving Years 1 to 6, with a roll of 185 students as of March 2026. Established in 1851, it is one of Dunedin’s oldest schools and has a long history of teacher training links through its “Normal School” designation. The school provides a broad curriculum with a focus on literacy, numeracy, the arts, sport, and student leadership, and serves the North East Valley community and surrounding suburbs.

Sacred Heart School is a state-integrated Catholic contributing primary school serving Years 1 to 6, with a roll of 60 students as of March 2026. Founded in 1895 at Sacred Heart Church, the school moved to its current site in the early 1900s. Sacred Heart School is part of the Catholic Diocese of Dunedin and emphasises faith-based education alongside the New Zealand Curriculum, with a strong focus on community, pastoral care, and small-class learning environments.

Dunedin North Intermediate (commonly known as DNI) is a state intermediate school serving Years 7 and 8 students from across northern and central Dunedin. The school has a reputation for strong academic, cultural, sporting, and leadership opportunities, and acts as a transition point between primary and secondary education for many local students. DNI offers a wide range of specialist programmes and extracurricular activities, including performing arts, technology, sport, and student leadership initiatives.
