= Water of Leith (New Zealand) =

River in Dunedin, New Zealand

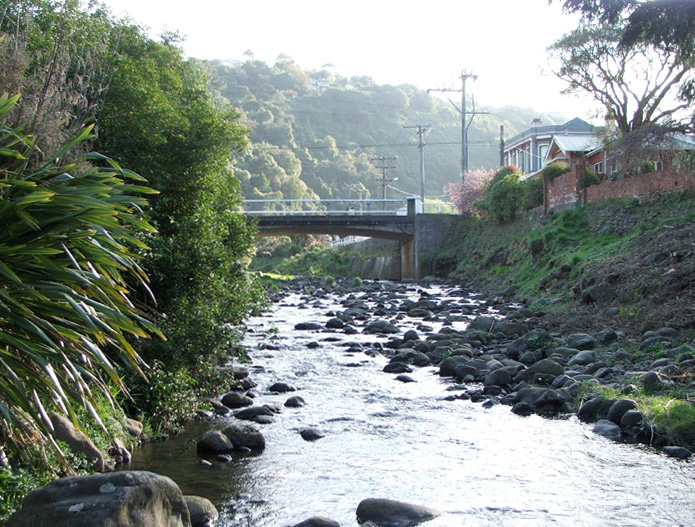
- Upper reaches of the Water of Leith, Woodhaugh, Dunedin
- Route of the Water of Leith

Location
- Country: New Zealand

Physical characteristics
- Source: Leith Saddle
  - location: Sullivans Dam
  - coordinates: 45°48′31″S 170°31′20″E
  - elevation: 380 m (1,250 ft)
- Mouth
  - location: Otago Harbour
  - coordinates: 45°52′19″S 170°31′33″E
  - elevation: 0 m (0 ft)
- Length: 14 km (8.7 mi)

Basin features
- Progression: Water of Leith → Otago Harbour → Pacific Ocean
- Tributaries
  - left: Lindsay Creek, Ōpoho Creek
  - right: Morrisons Burn, Nicols Creek, Ross Creek
- Bridges: George Street Bridge, St David Street Footbridge, University of Otago Stone Bridge, Leith Walk Bridge, Water of Leith Footbridge

The Water of Leith (also known as Ōwheo, the River Leith, Leith Stream or Leith Canal), is a small river in the South Island of New Zealand.

It rises to the north of the city of Dunedin, flowing for 14 kilometres (9 mi) southeast through the northern part of the city and the campuses of the University of Otago and Otago Polytechnic before reaching the Otago Harbour.

== Name ==
The original Māori name for the stream was Ōwheo ("The place of Wheo"). Wheo was a local chief whose village stood close to the river's original mouth, now within North Dunedin.

Dunedin is the anglicised form of Dùn Èideann which is the Scottish Gaelic form of the name Edinburgh, and thus the river is also named for the Water of Leith which runs through the Scottish capital.

In the early 20th Century, the watercourse was referred to as the "Leith Canal" in legislation (such as the Otago Harbour Board Empowering Act 1939) and in newspapers; this name is now rarely used.

== Course ==
The Leith's source is close to the Dunedin Northern Motorway, part of State Highway 1, 100 metres (330 ft) south of Leith Saddle, at an elevation of some 380 metres (1,250 ft) above sea level. The motorway passes over the Leith Saddle, which lies between the sources of the Leith and the Waitati River, approximately halfway between the northern suburb of Pine Hill and the outlying settlement of Waitati.

From here, the Leith flows south, skirting a water supply reservoir formed behind Sullivan's Dam, which was constructed in 1916. This reservoir, along with the Ross Creek Reservoir on the Ross Creek, one of the Leith's tributaries, provides much of Dunedin's drinking water.

From the southern end of the Sullivan's Dam reservoir, the Leith flows southwest, passing under the motorway and through the wooded Leith Valley. A gravel road parallels the course of this stretch of the river, becoming asphalted close to the point where the Leith meets the urban parts of the city at Glenleith. Several small tributaries join the Leith on this stretch, notably Morrison's Burn.

As it reaches urban Dunedin, the river is often only a modest stream, partly because of the quantity of water abstracted upstream. Much of the northern part of Dunedin's inner city area is situated on the river's floodplain.

The first of the Leith's two main tributaries, Ross Creek, joins the Leith between the suburbs of Glenleith and Woodhaugh. The Ross Creek Reservoir, a historic engineering project, is surrounded by numerous popular bush walks. Much of the upper Leith Valley is also crossed by less well-known bush tracks, though part of the upper reaches are closed to the public due to their importance for water catchment purposes. Close to this confluence, the remains can be seen of watermills which were used at Woodhaugh, which—though now a sleepy suburb—was once the industrial heart of the city. From here, the Leith turns to the southeast, passing through a public park, Woodhaugh Gardens, as its floodplain begins to widen. At this point, the floodplain is less than a kilometre in width, and is bordered by steep cliffs to the southwest.

The lower reaches of the Leith are contained within engineered, canal-like concrete channels. These, and the various weirs located in the Leith's stream—notably just to the north of Woodhaugh Gardens, were built to prevent a repeat of the serious damage to Dunedin North by the highest recorded flood in March 1929. An earlier devastating flood occurred on the river in 1868. The original course of the Leith was, in fact, a meandering track through what is now the central city, emptying into the upper harbour where Cumberland and Stuart Streets now meet.

The Leith enters the wider plain which is the location of Dunedin's most intensely urbanised area at the southeastern end of Woodhaugh Gardens, close to the northernmost point of the city's main street, George Street. From here, it winds around the northern edge of the floodplain, skirting the Dunedin Botanic Gardens, where it is joined by its other main tributary, Lindsay Creek. This small stream flows from the southern slopes of Mount Cargill, through Bethune's Gully and along North East Valley before crossing the Botanic Gardens and connecting with the Leith. A bronze statue of a trout in the Botanic Gardens commemorates the first liberation into a New Zealand river of brown trout, imported from Tasmania in 1869.

The Leith then turns south, flowing through the heart of the University of Otago campus at which point it veers east, passing the campus of Otago Polytechnic and the Dunedin College of Education and then Forsyth Barr Stadium before reaching the Otago Harbour south of Logan Park.

In 2018 a new cable stay footbridge was erected over the mouth of the Water of Leith (between the state highway bridge and the harbour). The Water of Leith Footbridge was commissioned by Dunedin City Council with funding from NZ Transport Agency. The project was a "Design and Construct" project costing NZ$1.4M. Design commenced in January 2018 and construction was completed in December 2018. The bridge spans 45m over the Leith and was constructed by Edifice Structures and designed by DC Structures Studio.

== Gallery ==
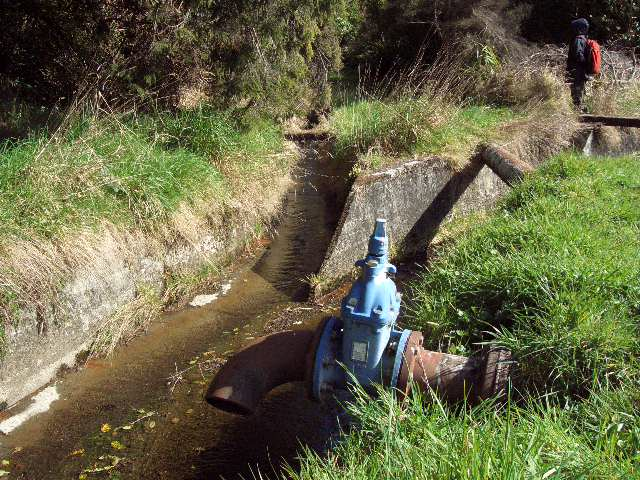
The headwaters of the Water of Leith diverted around Sullivan's Dam (2013).

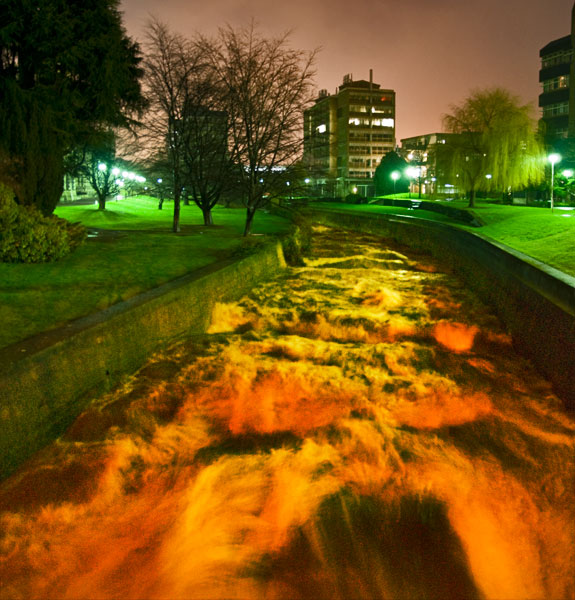
The Water of Leith by the University of Otago after heavy rain (2009).

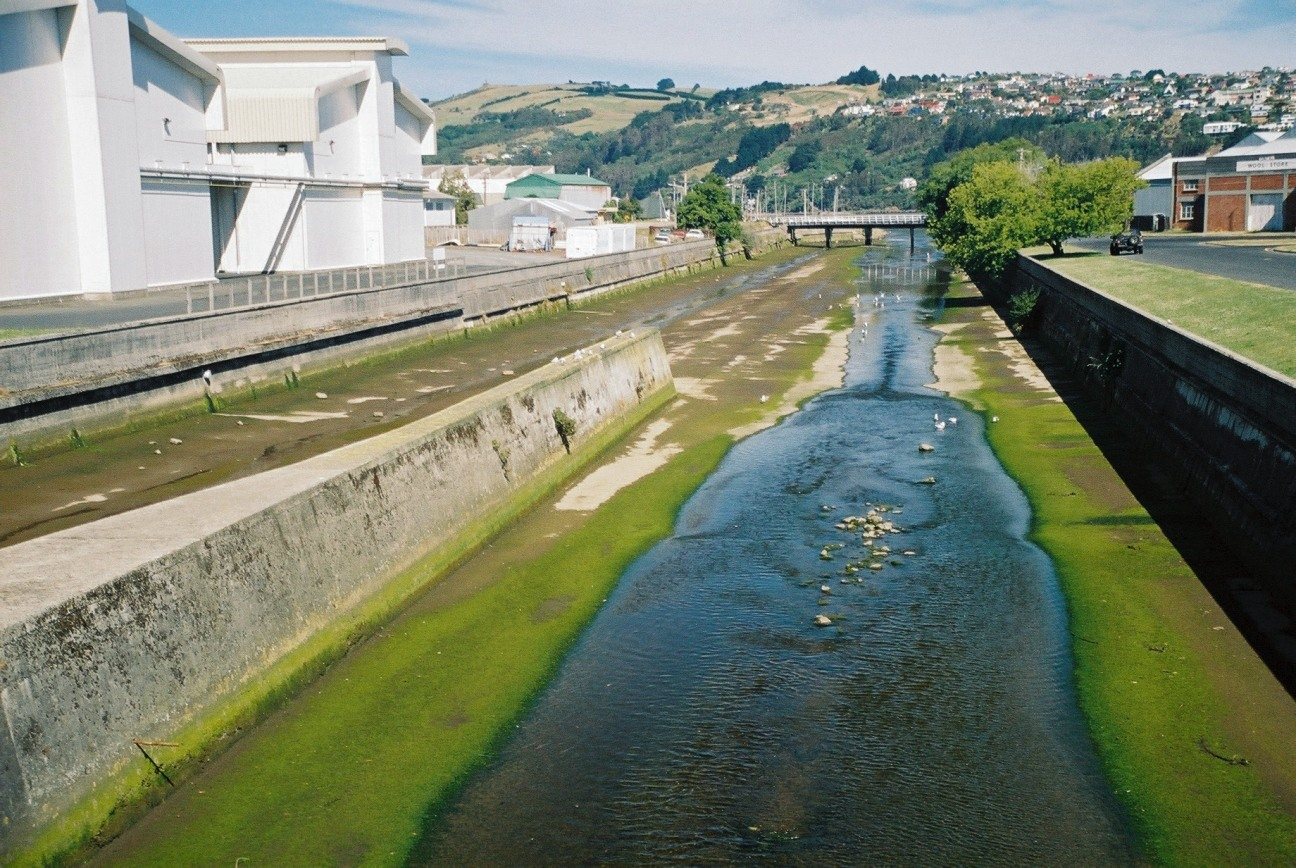
Water of Leith near its mouth in Dunedin (2005).

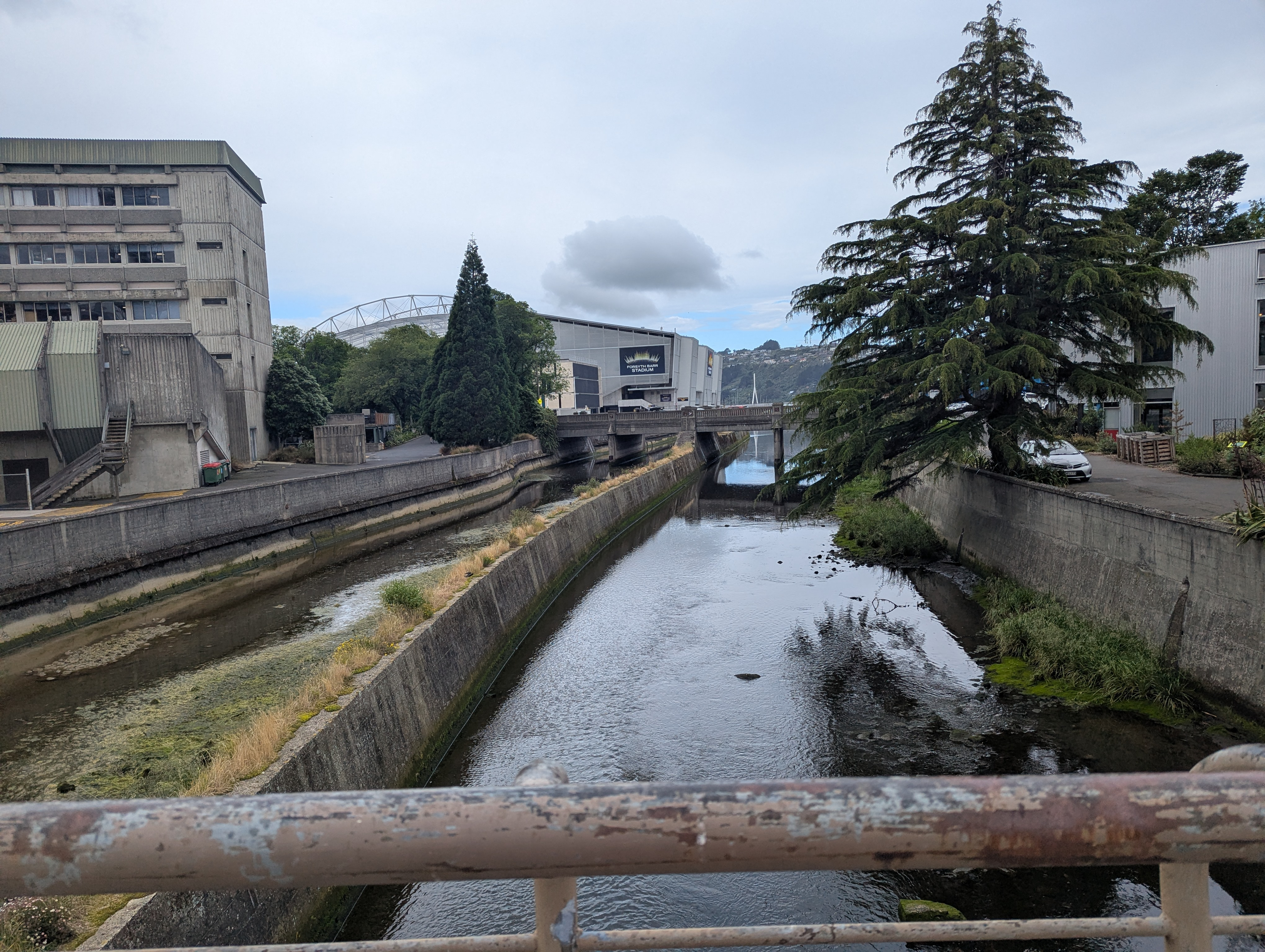
Water of Leith near its mouth in Dunedin with Forsyth Barr Stadium visible (2025).

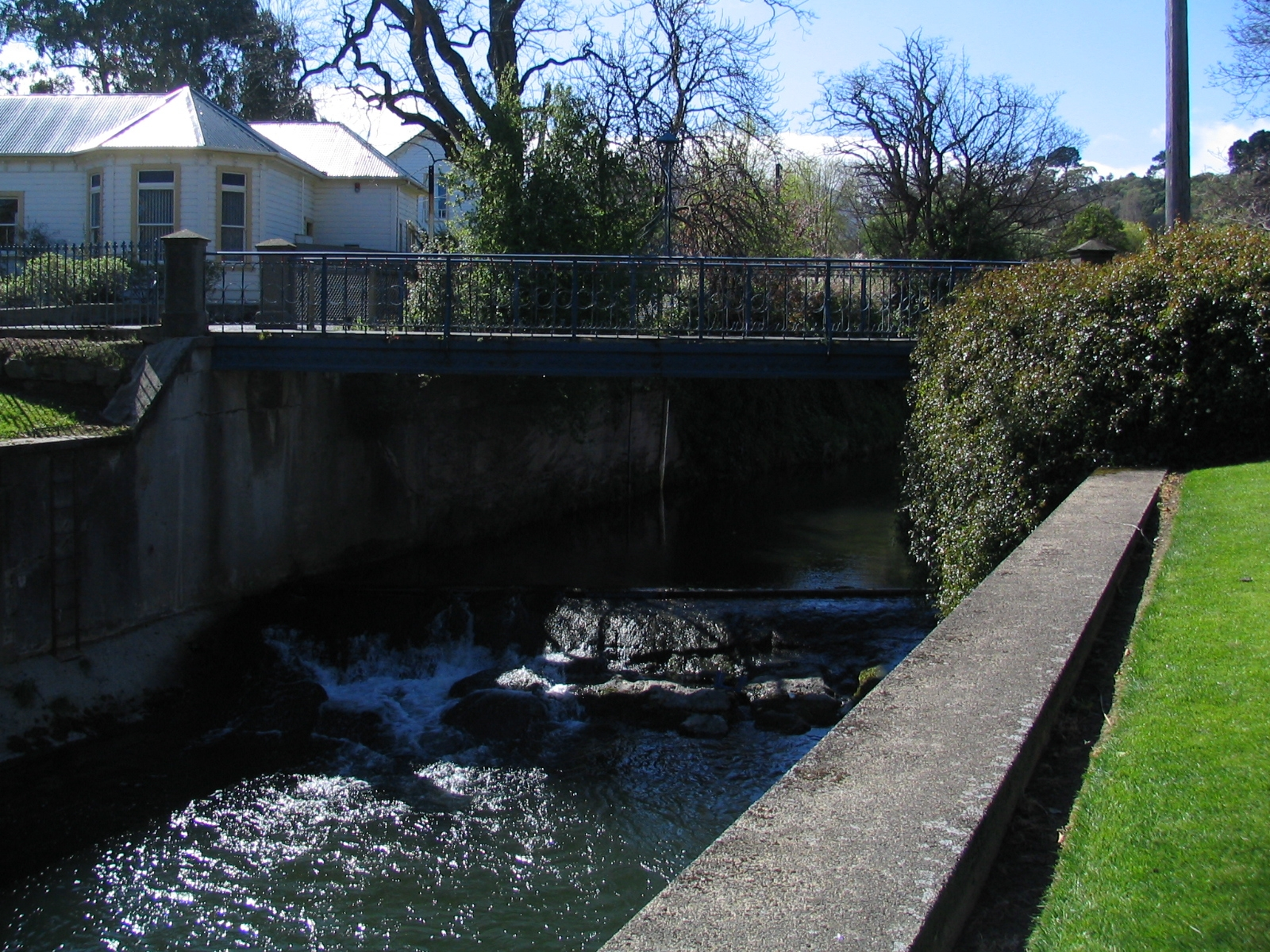
St David Street Footbridge at the University of Otago (2009).

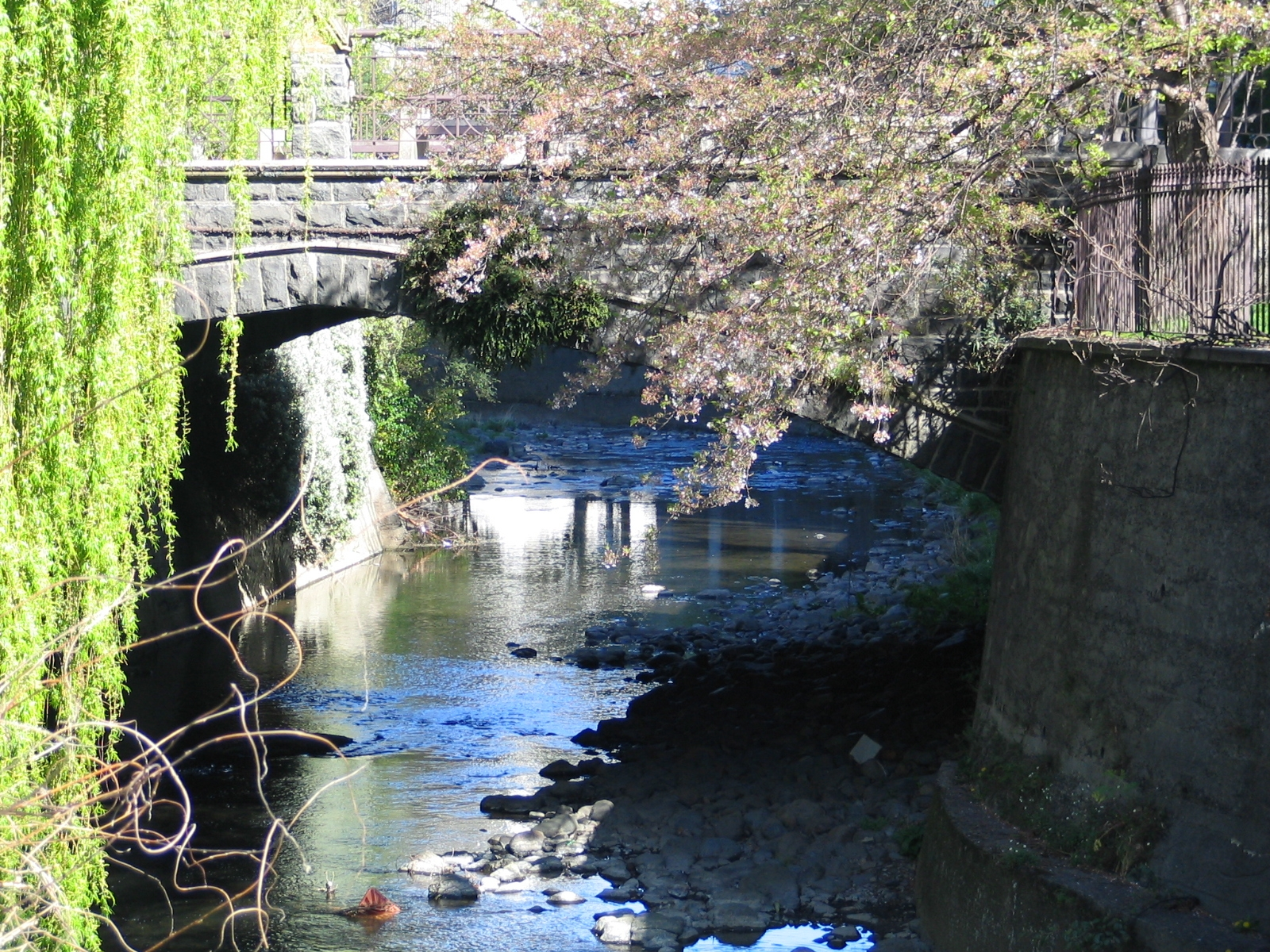
The University of Otago Stone Bridge, also known as the Union Street Bridge (2009).

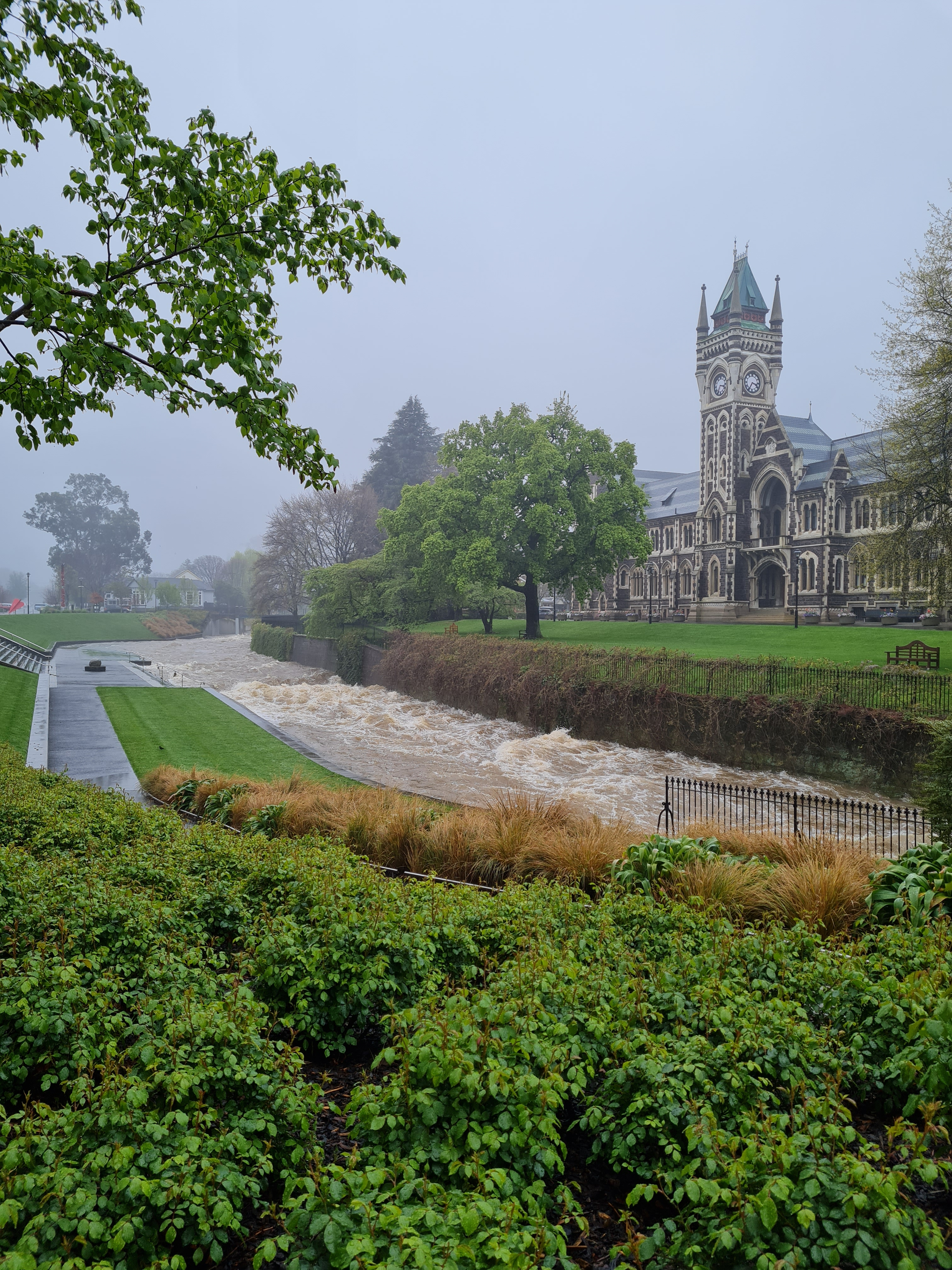
The Water of Leith during a high-flow event. Recorded discharge here of 33.86 m^{3}/s (2024).
