= Signal Hill (New Zealand) =

Hill in Dunedin, New Zealand

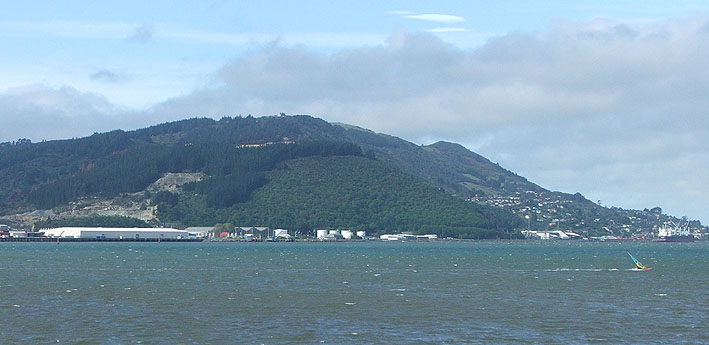
- Signal Hill, viewed from the south, across Otago Harbour. Logan Point quarry is visible to the left, and the suburb of Ravensbourne to the right

Highest point
- Elevation: 393 m (1,289 ft)
- Coordinates: 45°50′59″S 170°33′34″E

Naming
- Native name: Te Pahuri o te Rangipohika (Māori)

Geography
- Country: New Zealand
- Region: Otago
- District: Dunedin

Geology
- Volcanic zone: Dunedin Volcano complex

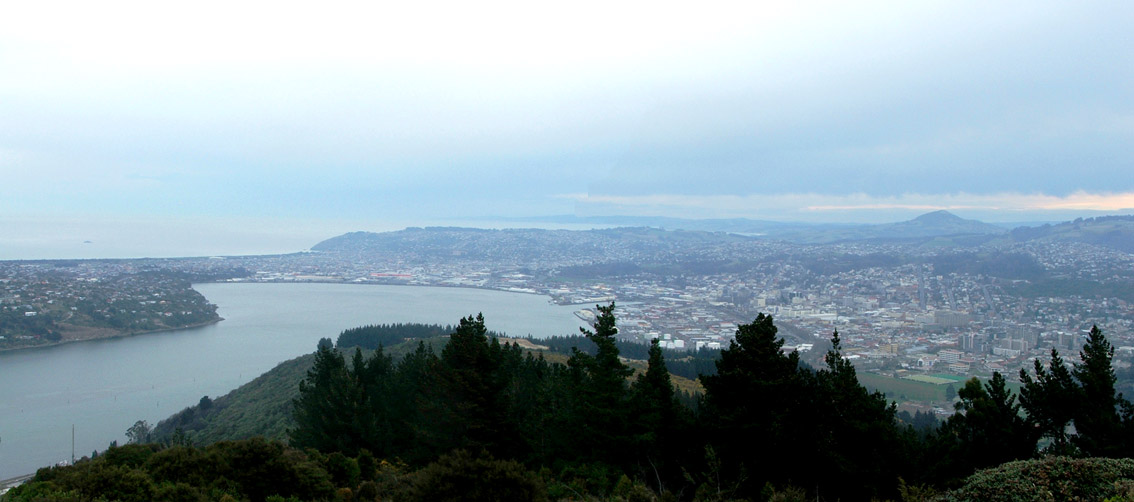
The view looking south across central Dunedin and the head of the Otago Harbour, from the New Zealand Centennial monument on Signal Hill

Signal Hill (Māori: Te Pahuri o te Rangipohika) is a prominent landform in the city of Dunedin, New Zealand. It is located close to, and due north of, the head of the Otago Harbour and reaches an elevation of 393 m (1289 ft). The suburbs Ravensbourne, St. Leonards, and Opoho lie on its southern, eastern, and northwestern flanks, respectively. To the northwest is North East Valley, the thalweg of Lindsay Creek, a tributary of the Water of Leith. The southernmost spur of Signal Hill, Logan Point, has been extensively quarried for road gravel. State Highway 88 skirts the foot of the hill close to the edge of the Otago Harbour.

An observatory for geodetic and astrophysical study was installed at the summit in the 1970s, which has since been removed.

A secondary summit of the hill (height 329 m) is capped by a monument to the New Zealand Centennial of 1940, a large structure including two large bronze figures representing "History" and "The Thread of Life" designed by F. A. Shurrock and F. W. Staub. (colloquially known as 'the buddhas' in local slang for their similarities to the sitting posture of the buddha figure).

Although commissioned for the centenary of the signing of the Treaty of Waitangi, the monument was not constructed until the 1950s, owing to the enforced strictures of World War II. A large stone from Edinburgh in Scotland is also incorporated in the monument, symbolising the ties between Dunedin and its sister city.

The monument is surrounded by a scenic reserve 180 hectares in extent. This park was inaugurated as a much smaller park in 1926, and has gradually been extended to its current size. The reserve, located only five kilometres from central Dunedin, is a popular site for both locals and visitors, and affords an excellent panoramic view over the city.

In October 2006, a series of bush fires caused extensive damage to the plantations of forest which cover the western slopes of the hill.
