= Lindsay Creek =

Tributary to the Water of Leith in Dunedin, New Zealand

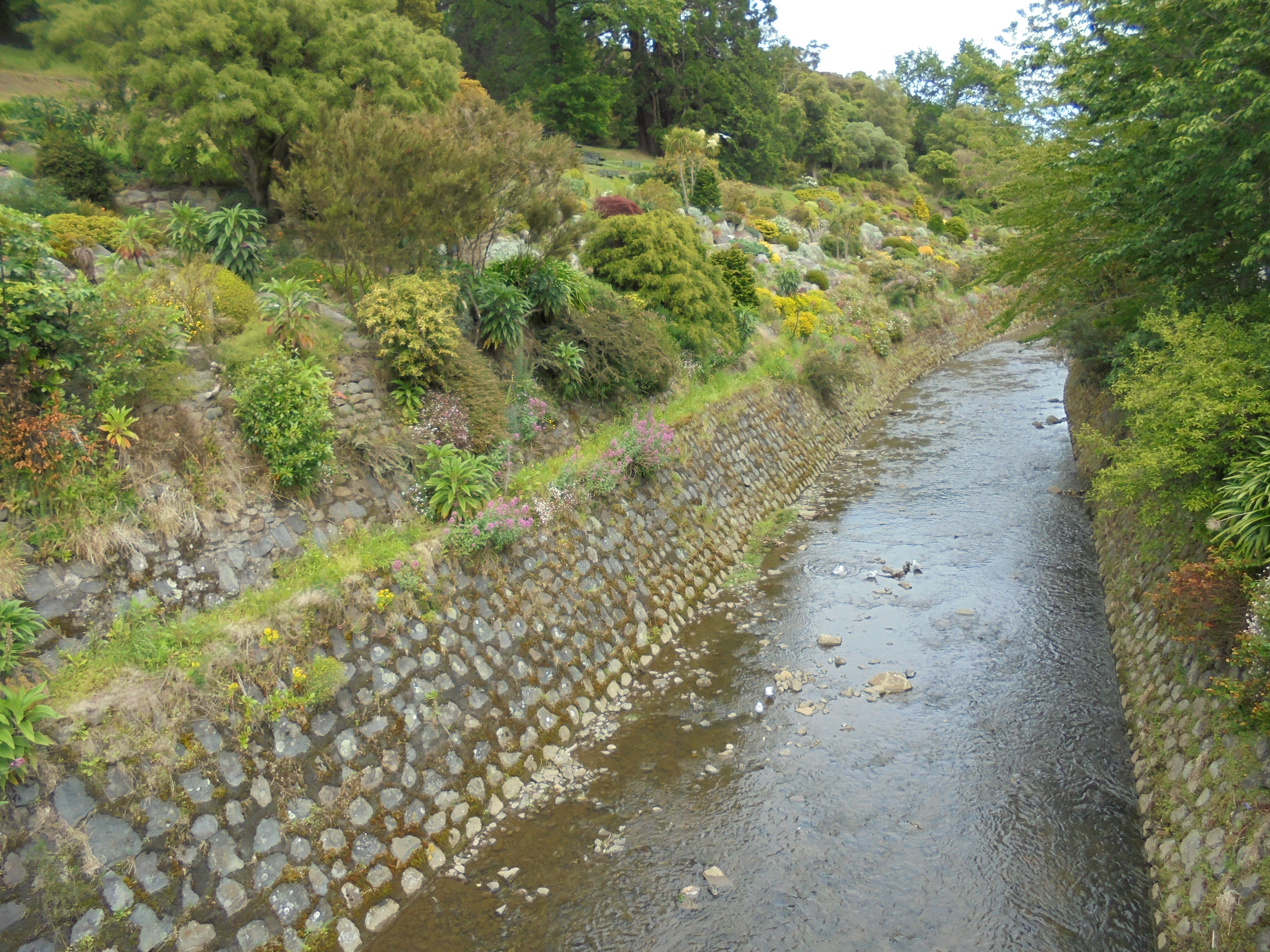
- The Botanic Garden section of Lindsay Creek
- Route of Lindsay Creek
- Mouth of Lindsay Creek Lindsay Creek (South Island)

Location
- Country: New Zealand

Physical characteristics
- Source: Mount Cargill
  - coordinates: 45°49′08″S 170°32′46″E
- Mouth
  - location: Water of Leith
  - coordinates: 45°51′29″S 170°31′08″E

Basin features
- Progression: Water of Leith → Otago Harbour → Pacific Ocean

The Lindsay Creek is a tributary of the Water of Leith which runs through the northern suburbs of Dunedin, New Zealand. The Māori name Puke-haukea has been attributed to the creek, possibly meaning "to flow away from the hill" (from puke, hill, and haukea, apart or away from).

The creek has its origins on the southern slopes of Mount Cargill (Kapukataumahaka) about one kilometre southeast of the summit, and flows south, passing through the popular recreation reserve of Bethunes Gully before reaching Dunedin's suburban area at Normanby. It continues south-southwest, its thalweg running through North East Valley, passing through Chingford Park and along the foot of the Valley's Quarry Gardens before reaching the coastal plain of the Leith at The Gardens Corner. From here, it flows into Dunedin Botanic Gardens where it joins the Water of Leith (Ōwheo).

Several measures are underway to widen the channel of the creek at various points, in an attempt to provide more protection against floods. The creek has flooded on numerous occasions, most significantly in the Leith Flood of 1929 and in 1955, when it led to the inundation of many properties in North East Valley. Protection works have been built over the years, most notably realignment and walling of the channel in the lower part of North East Valley after the 1929 flood and further work on the same area in 1965. Further walling of the channel in the central part of North East Valley was undertaken during the 1970s.
