= Mount Cargill =

Mountain in New Zealand

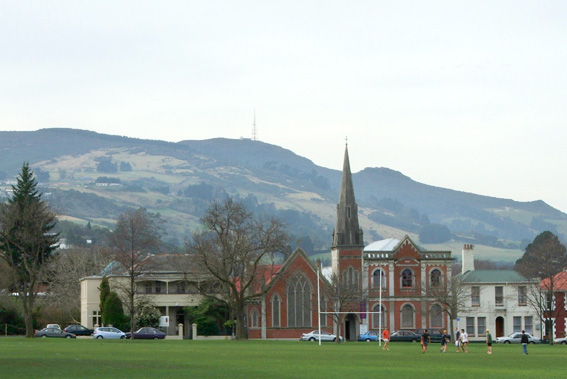
- Mount Cargill (centre) and Buttar's Peak (to the right of the church steeple) dominate the skyline of Dunedin, New Zealand

Highest point
- Elevation: 676 m (2,218 ft)
- Parent peak: Silver Peak
- Isolation: to Swampy Summit
- Coordinates: 45.8131°S 170.5548°E

Naming
- Native name: Kapukataumahaka (Māori)

Geography
- Mount Cargill (red marker) on map of selected nearby surface volcanic features. Legend: Key for the volcanics that are shown with panning is: basalt (shades of brown/orange); monogenetic basalts; undifferentiated basalts; arc basalts; arc ring basalts; olivine (basalts shades of olive); phonolite (pale salmon); dacite; andesite (shades of red); basaltic andesite; rhyolite, (ignimbrite is lighter shades of violet); plutonic or intusive (gray) - so dolerite/diabase/microgabbro will have shadings towards gray compared to erupted basalt.; Clicking on the rectangle icon enables full window and mouse-over with volcano name/wikilink and ages before present.
- Country: New Zealand
- Region: Otago
- District: Dunedin

Geology
- Volcanic zone: Dunedin Volcano complex

Climbing
- Easiest route: Cowan Road
- Normal route: Mount Cargill Walk

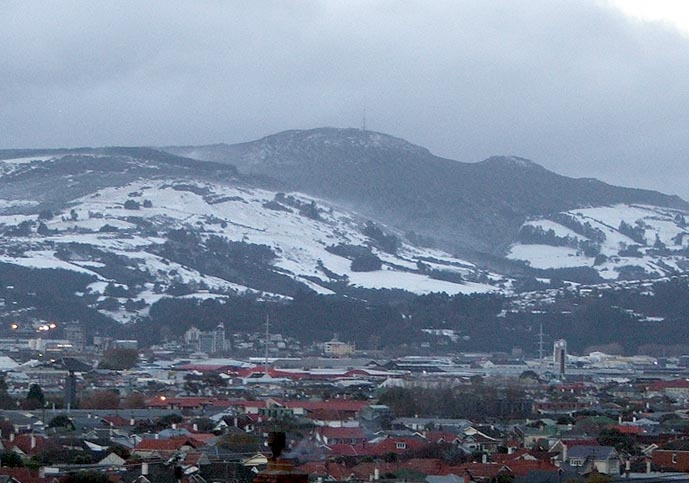
Dunedin sits beneath the snowy mid-winter slopes of Mt. Cargill in this photo from July 2007.

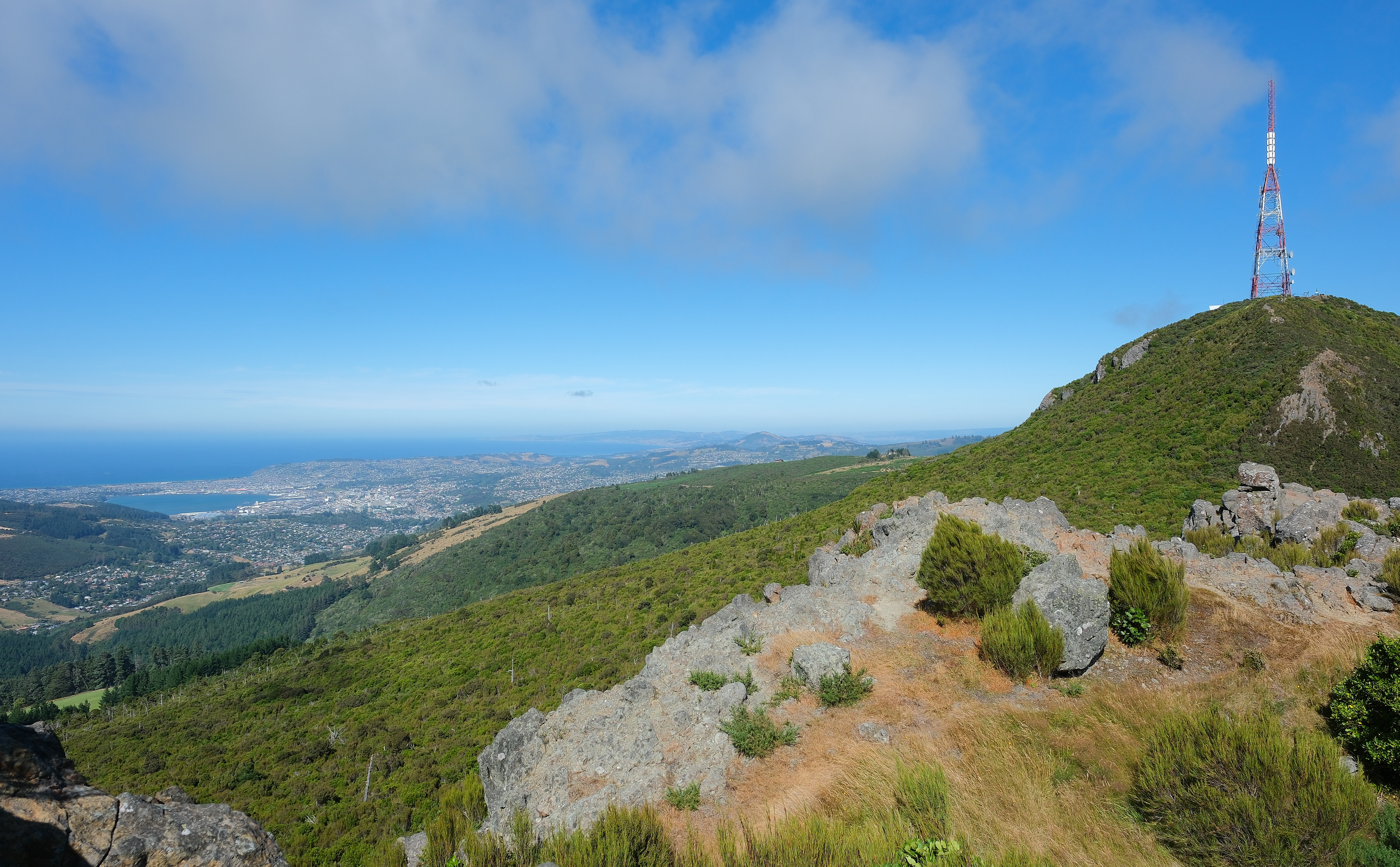
Mount Cargill and Dunedin from Buttar's Peak

Mount Cargill, known in Māori as Kapukataumahaka, is a volcanic outcrop which dominates the skyline of northern Dunedin, New Zealand.

The peak is named for Captain William Cargill, an early leader of the Province of Otago. Māori legend tells of the mountain showing the profile of a prominent warrior, and indeed from Dunedin Buttar's Peak and Mount Cargill between them do form the outline of a reclining figure, with the nearby Buttar's Peak being the head and Mount Cargill the body.

Panoramic views of Dunedin and its surrounding area are visible from the summit, making it a popular, if difficult to access, site. A single rough road ascends to the peak, and several popular walking tracks also ascend the slopes.

Mount Cargill is topped by a telecommunications station and mast, the Mount Cargill Transmitting Station. The mast is Dunedin's tallest man-made structure.

== Geography ==
Mt. Cargill is situated some 15 kilometres (9 miles) north of the city centre, and dominates the city's northern skyline. It rises to a height of 676 metres (2,218 ft). To the north and east of Mount Cargill's peak are several smaller peaks including Mount Zion, Mount Holmes and (most notably) Buttar's Peak.

A rough road from the end of Pine Hill Road provides vehicular access to the summit, and several walking tracks also lead to the top, notably a 4-kilometre (2.5 mi) walk from Bethune's Gully in North East Valley at the northern end of Dunedin's urban area and a 6-kilometre (3.7 mi) walk through Graham's Bush, which starts in Sawyers Bay close to Port Chalmers. These tracks pass through regenerating native bush and volcanic outcrops before a sharp climb along the northern flank immediately below the summit.

The tracks pass two significant points of interest. One of these is a prominent formation of columnar jointed basalt known as the Organ Pipes. Similar outcrops are found elsewhere in the Dunedin area, at Blackhead near Waldronville and at Second Beach, Saint Clair. The second point of interest is the small temperate cloud forest which dominates the vegetation of the upper slopes. Though not a true cloud forest, in that it is not tropical, it bears many of the hallmarks of true cloud forest, with abundant moss and fern cover under thick low canopy. The cloud forest is protected within a 1.8-square-kilometre (0.69 sq mi) reserve, which includes the peak of the mountain as well as several secondary peaks. Although the tracks are easy (but steep), care should be taken by walkers, as the weather conditions on Mount Cargill are notoriously unpredictable and can change very rapidly.

The peak is, along with the similarly high Flagstaff one of the highest points surrounding Dunedin, and as such, it is a popular lookout. From the summit, views can be obtained of the entire Dunedin urban area, as well as a considerable stretch of open countryside and much of Otago's coastline, from Shag Point near Palmerston to Nugget Point in The Catlins. Particularly notable is the view of the Otago Peninsula and Otago Harbour, the entire length of which can be seen from the summit.

== Geology ==
Mount Cargill, and the nearby smaller peaks are among the youngest parts of the massive extinct Dunedin Volcano and was formed between 16 and 10 million years ago. Its peak comprises a nepheline phonolite dome, an intrusion through earlier pyroclastics and phonolite flows, suggesting that the volcanic origins of the peak were as a pyroclastic cone, followed by a plugging with the nepheline dome.

Buttar's Peak and Mt. Zion are similar, smaller domes. Mt. Holmes is a more distinct plug, featuring the columnar jointed basalt of the Organ Pipes.

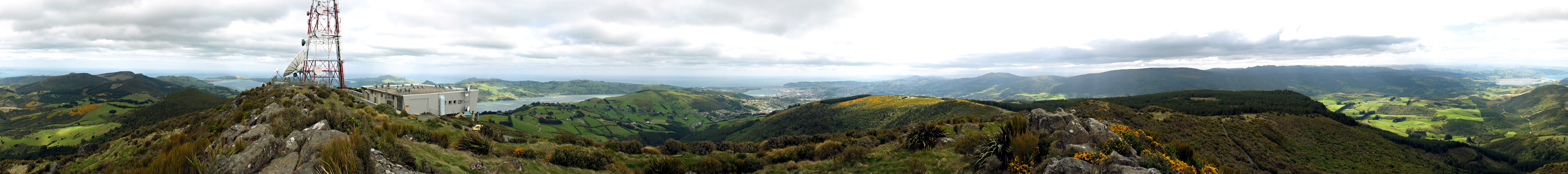
This is a panorama of the view from the summit of Mount Cargill. The base of a television mast can be seen on the left, with the Otago Harbour and the Otago Peninsula beyond. Dunedin city centre can be seen in the middle.

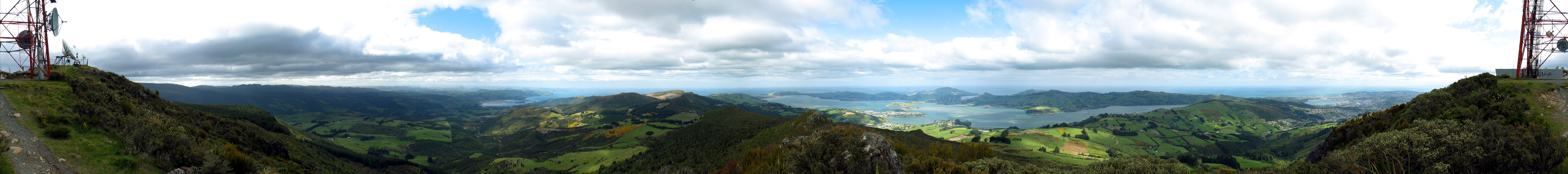
This is a panorama of the view from just east of the summit of Mount Cargill. Otago Harbour runs from its entrance near the centre to the city centre on the right, the peninsula can be seen beyond. The central foreground shows the nearby Buttar's Peak. The base of a television mast can be seen at the extreme left and right edges.

== Demographics ==
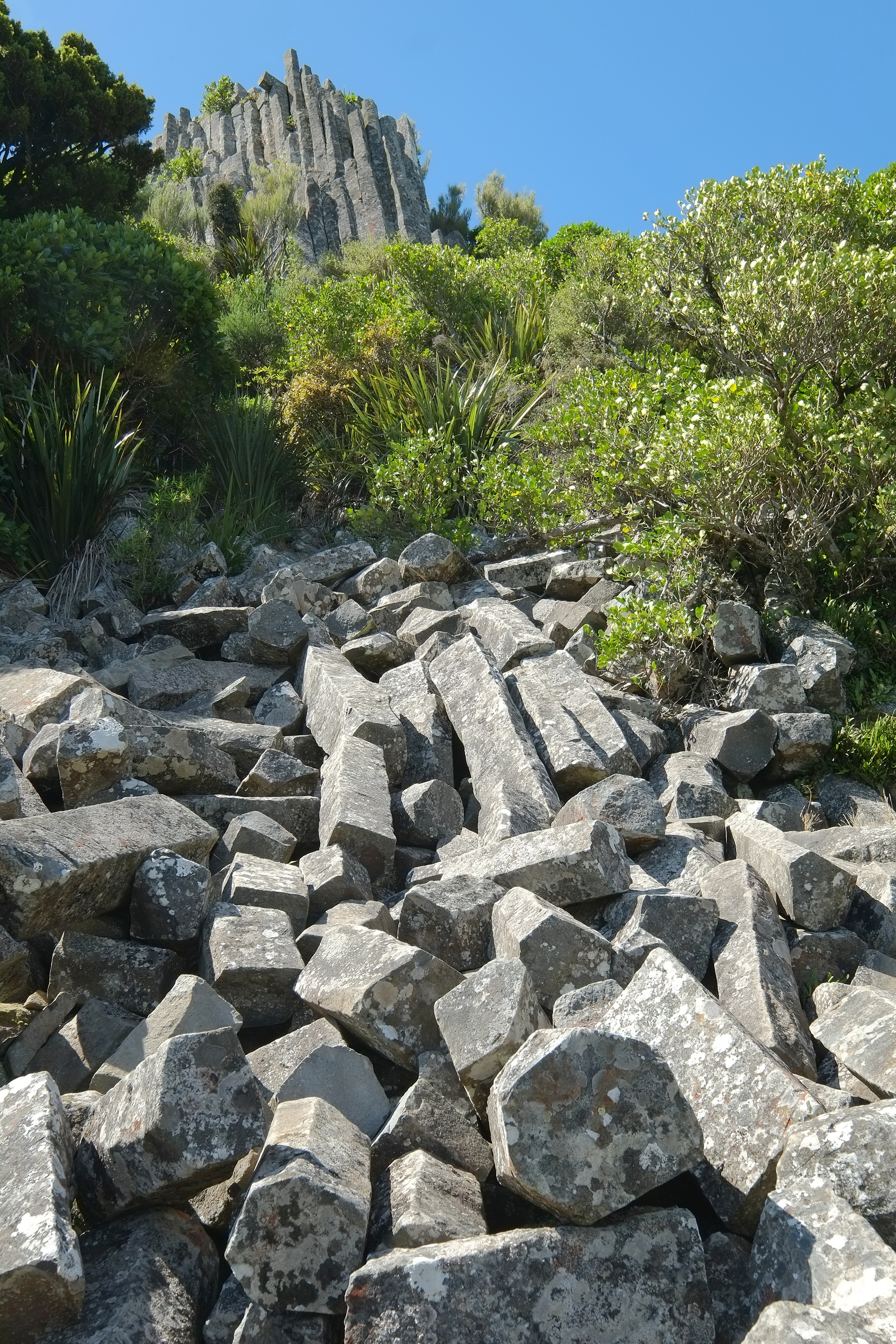
Organ Pipes on Mount Cargill

The Mount Cargill statistical area includes Waitati, Pūrākaunui and Aramoana. It covers 129.78 km^{2} (50.11 sq mi) and had an estimated population of 2,170 as of June 2025, with a population density of 17 people per km^{2}.

Historical population
Year	Pop.	±% p.a.
2006	1,755	—
2013	1,776	+0.17%
2018	2,016	+2.57%

Mount Cargill had a population of 2,016 at the 2018 New Zealand census, an increase of 240 people (13.5%) since the 2013 census, and an increase of 261 people (14.9%) since the 2006 census. There were 798 households, comprising 1,038 males and 975 females, giving a sex ratio of 1.06 males per female. The median age was 47.0 years (compared with 37.4 years nationally), with 390 people (19.3%) aged under 15 years, 192 (9.5%) aged 15 to 29, 1,119 (55.5%) aged 30 to 64, and 312 (15.5%) aged 65 or older.

Ethnicities were 92.9% European/Pākehā, 7.9% Māori, 0.9% Pasifika, 2.4% Asian, and 3.6% other ethnicities. People may identify with more than one ethnicity.

The percentage of people born overseas was 23.7, compared with 27.1% nationally.

Although some people chose not to answer the census's question about religious affiliation, 62.9% had no religion, 25.1% were Christian, 0.4% had Māori religious beliefs, 0.1% were Hindu, 0.7% were Buddhist and 3.4% had other religions.

Of those at least 15 years old, 639 (39.3%) people had a bachelor's or higher degree, and 189 (11.6%) people had no formal qualifications. The median income was $34,000, compared with $31,800 nationally. 363 people (22.3%) earned over $70,000 compared to 17.2% nationally. The employment status of those at least 15 was that 822 (50.6%) people were employed full-time, 291 (17.9%) were part-time, and 54 (3.3%) were unemployed.

== Transmitting station ==
The Mount Cargill transmitting station sits atop the mountain, broadcasting television and FM radio to Dunedin and the eastern Otago area. The station was completed in 1970, transmitting television channel DNTV2 (now part of TVNZ 1) and replacing the original station at Highcliff. The station features a 104.6-metre (343 ft) mast, the tallest structure in Dunedin.

The following television stations and radio stations broadcast from Mount Cargill:

Television Station	Transmit Channel	Transmit Frequency	Band	Power (kW)
World TV digital	28	530.0 MHz	UHF	25
Sky digital	30	546.0 MHz	UHF	25
MediaWorks digital	32	562.0 MHz	UHF	25
TVNZ digital	34	578.0 MHz	UHF	25
Kordia digital	36	594.0 MHz	UHF	25
Māori Television digital	38	610.0 MHz	UHF	25
Radio stations	Transmit Channel	Transmit Frequency	Band	Power (kW)
ZM		88.6 MHz	VHF	8
The Hits		89.4 MHz	VHF	16
The Sound		90.2 MHz	VHF	8
Radio One		91.0 MHz	VHF	2.5
The Edge		91.8 MHz	VHF	100
RNZ Concert		92.6 MHz	VHF	32
The Rock		93.4 MHz	VHF	8
Life FM		94.2 MHz	VHF	1
Radio Hauraki		95.8 MHz	VHF	16
George FM		96.6 MHz	VHF	40
More FM		97.4 MHz	VHF	40
The Breeze		98.2 MHz	VHF	40
Magic		99.8 MHz	VHF	2.5
More FM		100.6 MHz	VHF	8
Coast		104.6 MHz	VHF	8
Otago Access Radio		105.4 MHz	VHF	8
Flava		106.2 MHz	VHF	8

=== Former analogue television frequencies ===
The following frequencies were used until 29 April 2013, when Mount Cargill switched off analogue broadcasts (see Digital changeover dates in New Zealand).

TV Channel	Transmit Channel	Transmit Frequency	Band	Power (kW)
TV One	2	55.25 MHz	VHF	160
TV2	4	175.25 MHz	VHF	1000
TV3	9	210.25 MHz	VHF	100
Four	11	224.25 MHz	VHF	100
Māori Television	44	655.25 MHz	UHF	100
Prime	60	783.25 MHz	UHF	100
Channel 39	62	799.25 MHz	UHF	1.6
