= Dunedin Botanic Garden =

Botanical garden

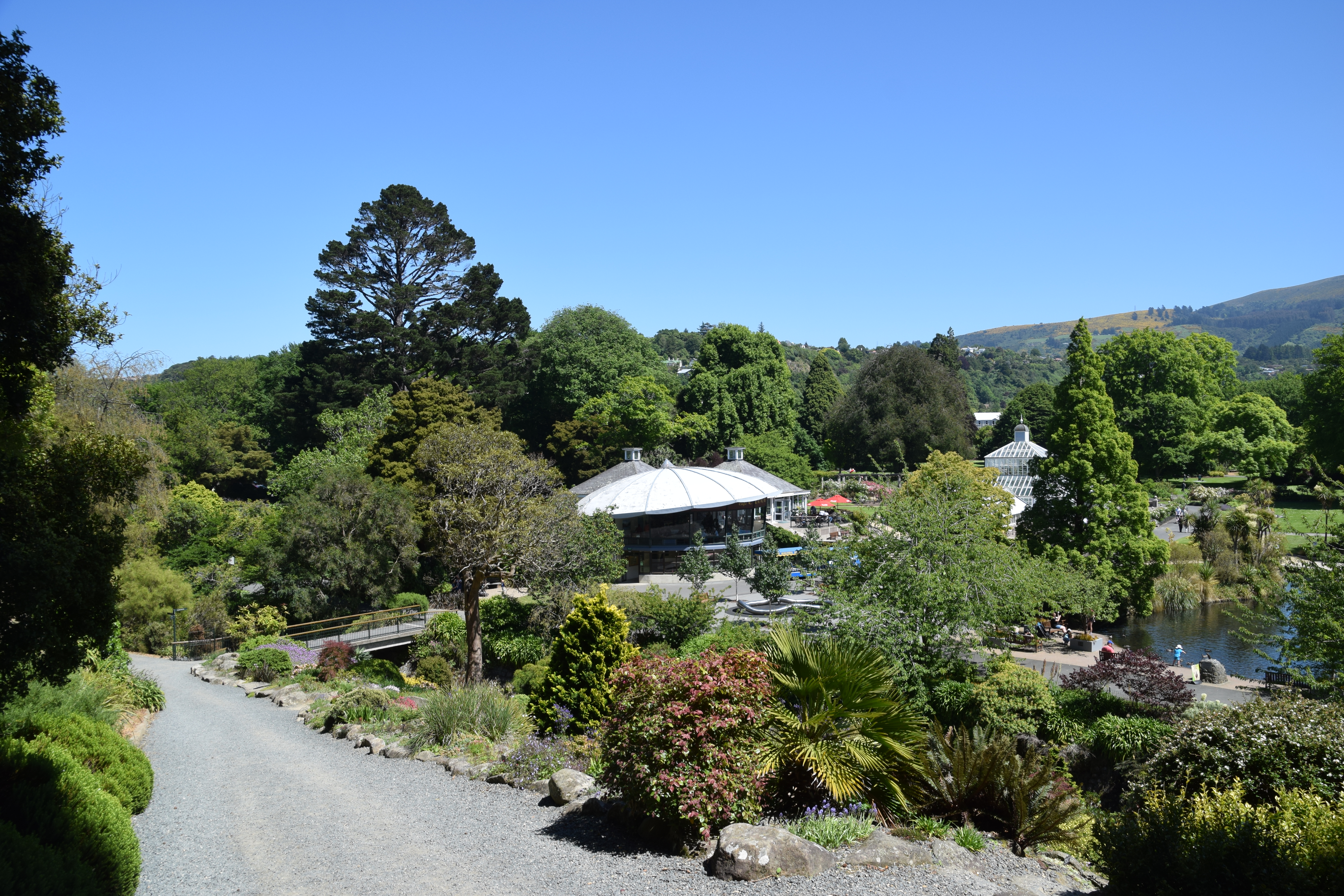
- The lower gardens in 2017
- Interactive map of Dunedin Botanic Garden
- Type: Botanical garden
- Location: Dunedin, New Zealand
- Coordinates: 45°51′27″S 170°31′21″E
- Created: 1863
- Operator: Dunedin City Council
- Status: Open all year

The Dunedin Botanic Garden (often incorrectly referred to as the Botanic or Botanical Gardens) is located at the northern end of central Dunedin, in the South Island of New Zealand. The garden is close to the University of Otago and one of the city's most historic cemeteries, the Northern Cemetery, on a spur of Signal Hill and on the river plain immediately below it.

The location of the gardens makes them popular with university students, as they lie between the university and the mouth of North East Valley, which houses a substantial proportion of the city's tertiary students. The gardens are also easily accessible by road from the city centre, being located close to the northern end of the city's main business street, George Street, and at the northern end of the city's one-way street system, part of State Highway 1. A small suburban shopping centre lies close to the garden's northern entrance at an intersection known as The Gardens Corner.

== The garden ==
The two parts of the Dunedin Botanic Garden are known simply as the upper garden and the lower gardens. The lower gardens are at an altitude of some 25 metres; the upper gardens rise up the hill-spur to a height of 85 metres.

=== Lower Gardens ===
The lower gardens' features include the Winter Garden, a heated Edwardian glass house, rose and herb gardens, a duck pond, children's playground, sound shell, and Japanese garden, the latter commemorating links with Dunedin's Japanese sister city, Otaru. A small tributary of the Leith, the Lindsay Creek, flows through the lower gardens. A cafe and visitors' centre are located to the west of this creek, next to the large duck pond and tropical glass house.

The lower gardens are also noted for their sculptures and statues, among them an ornate fountain, a gift of Wolf Harris, and a pair of statues by Cecil Thomas depicting Peter Pan and the Darling children from the novel Peter Pan. A near replica of the Peter Pan sculpture can be found close to Rotokawau Virginia Lake in Whanganui. A more modern sculpture, in the form of pillars representing fern shoots in stylised Māori koru, decorates the northern entrance to the gardens.

Two places within the lower gardens are listed as Category II Historic Places by Heritage New Zealand: the Wolf Harris fountain (listed in 1982), and the sound shell (listed in 1986).

=== Upper Gardens ===
The upper gardens are split by a winding public road, Lovelock Avenue (named for former Dunedin resident, Olympic gold medallist Jack Lovelock). Along each side of this road are bush walks. The upper garden features a geographic plant collection, a small aviary, native plant collection and an extensive rhododendron dell. Also a geological walking trail shows the Dunedin Volcano's different eruptive phases in the upper gardens and along the Water of Leith.

== History ==
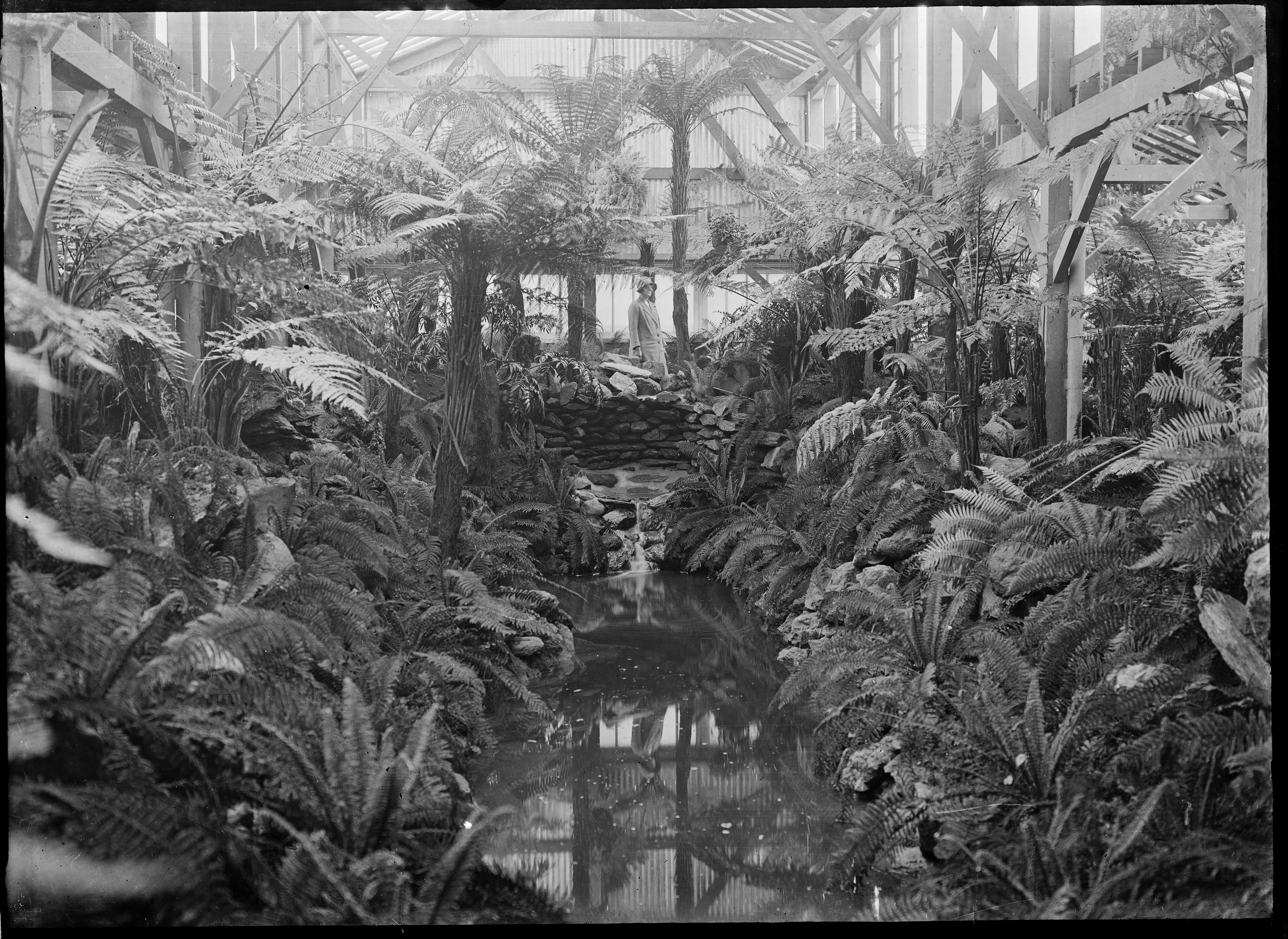
Inside the glasshouse, 1926

The Dunedin Botanic Garden is the oldest botanical garden in New Zealand, and was established in 1863 on a site surrounding the Water of Leith now occupied by the University of Otago. After extensive flooding in 1868, the gardens were moved to their current site in 1869. The name of the former site is still recorded in corrupted form in the now little-used name of Tanna or Tani (i.e., Botanic) Hill for the small but steep rise located close to the university's registry building). In 1878 the city council had a gang of prison labourers working on the gardens.

The garden was extensively enlarged during the early years of the 20th century under the stewardship of David Tannock. The garden forms part of Dunedin's Town Belt, a green belt surrounding the inner city, and covers a total of 28 ha (69 acres).

In July 2010, the Dunedin Botanic Garden was awarded a rank of "Garden of International Significance" by the New Zealand Gardens Trust, becoming one of only six gardens nationwide to be awarded this honour. The only other garden in the South Island with this ranking is also in Dunedin, at Larnach Castle.

== Gallery ==
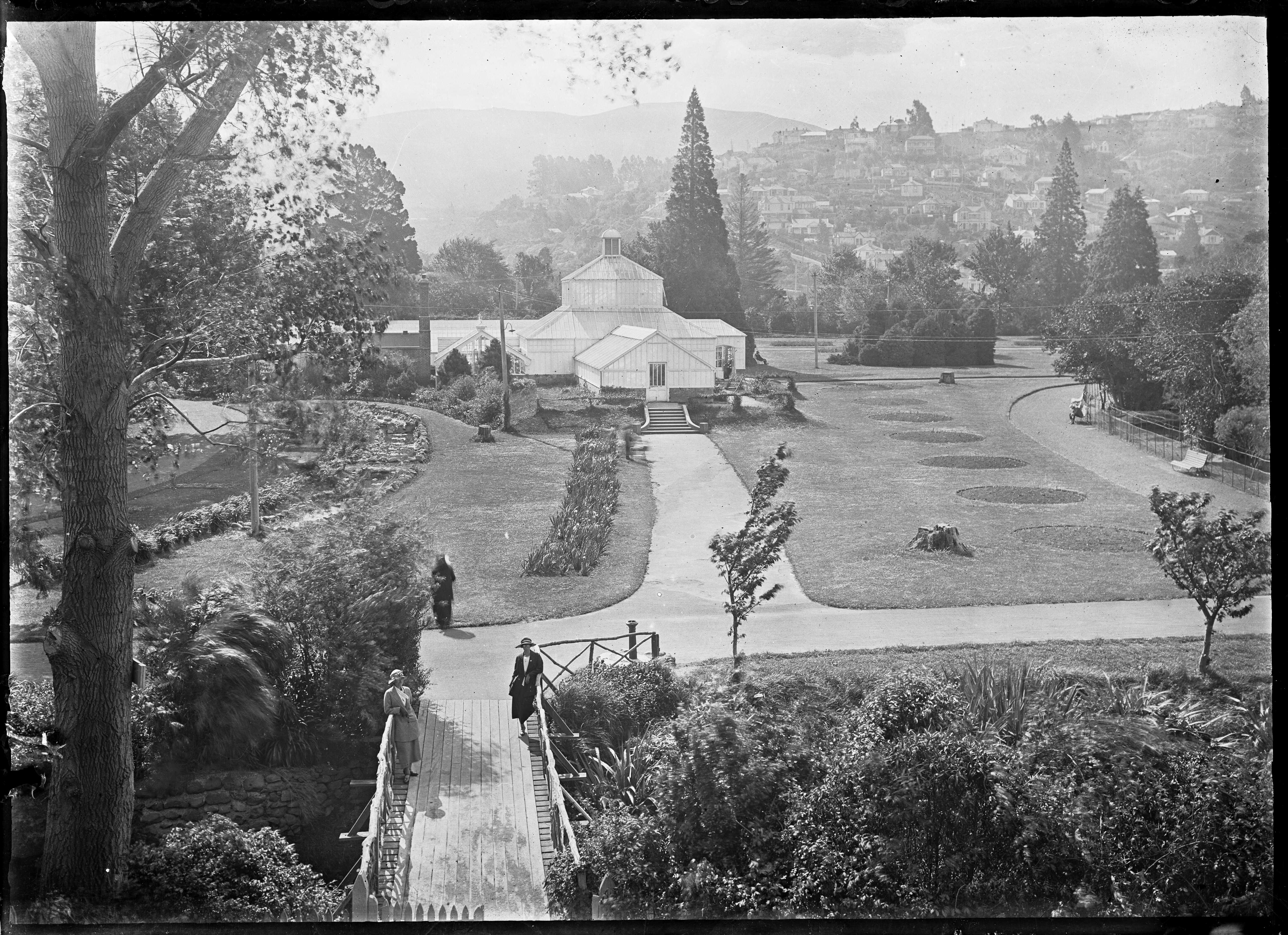
The gardens in the 1920s

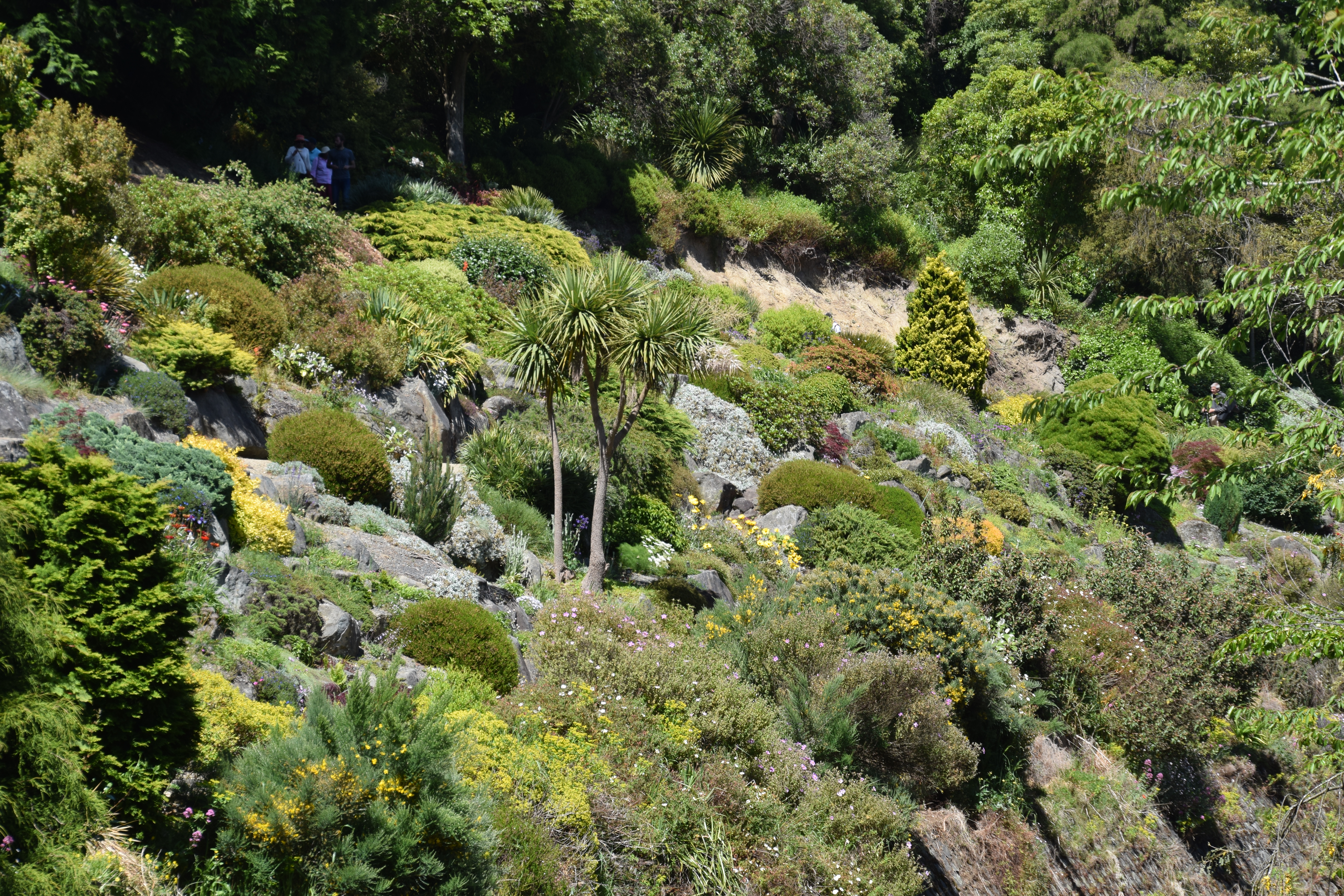
The upper gardens in 2005

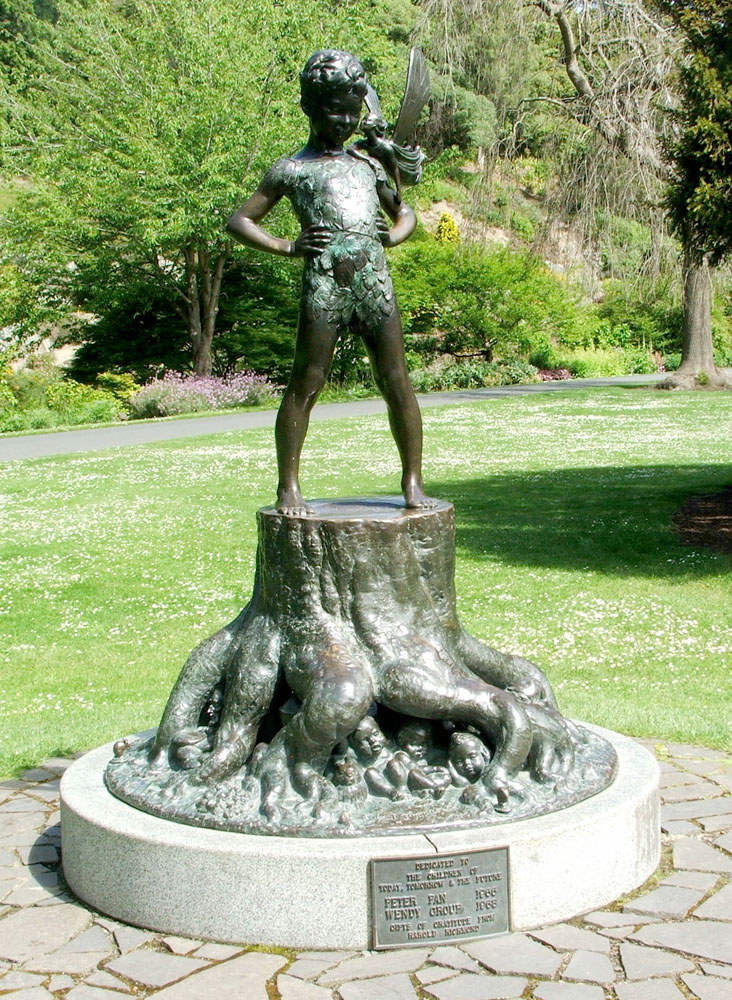
Cecil Thomas's Peter Pan statue, one of a pair of statues based on J.M. Barrie's novel, added to the garden in 1965

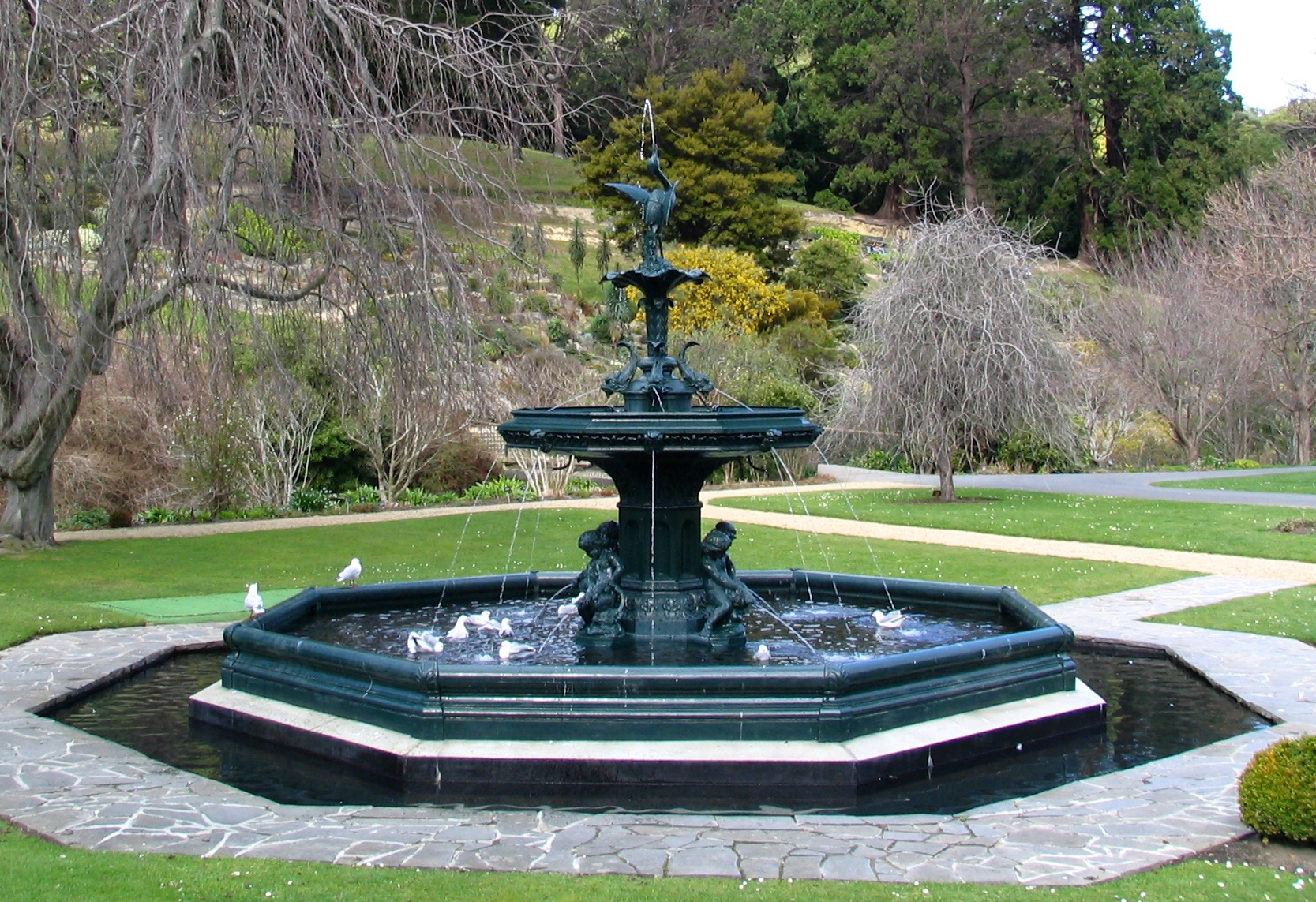
The Wolf Harris Fountain was erected in 1890, and is listed as a Category II Historic Place

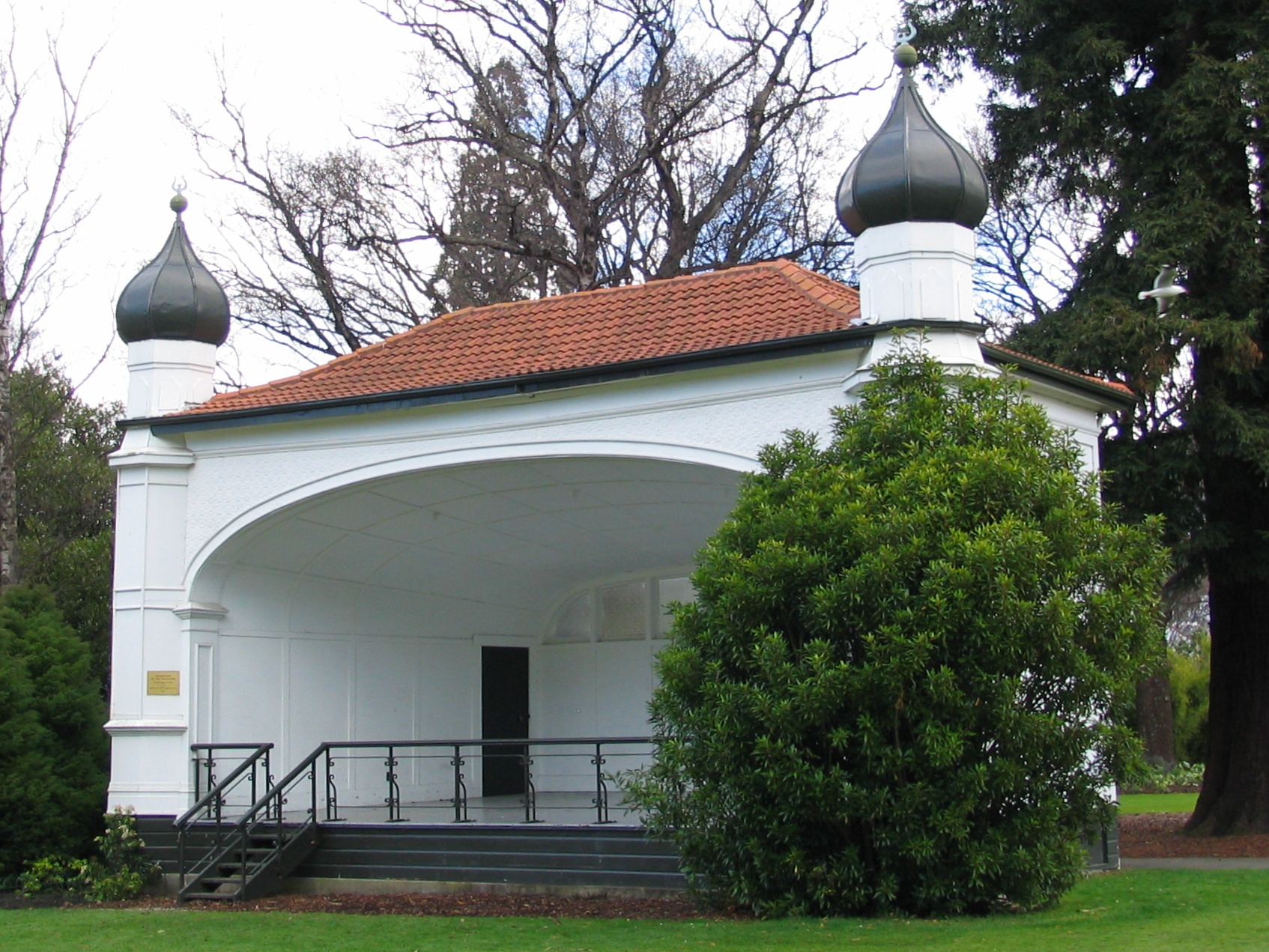
The sound shell, built in 1914, is also a Category II Historic Place

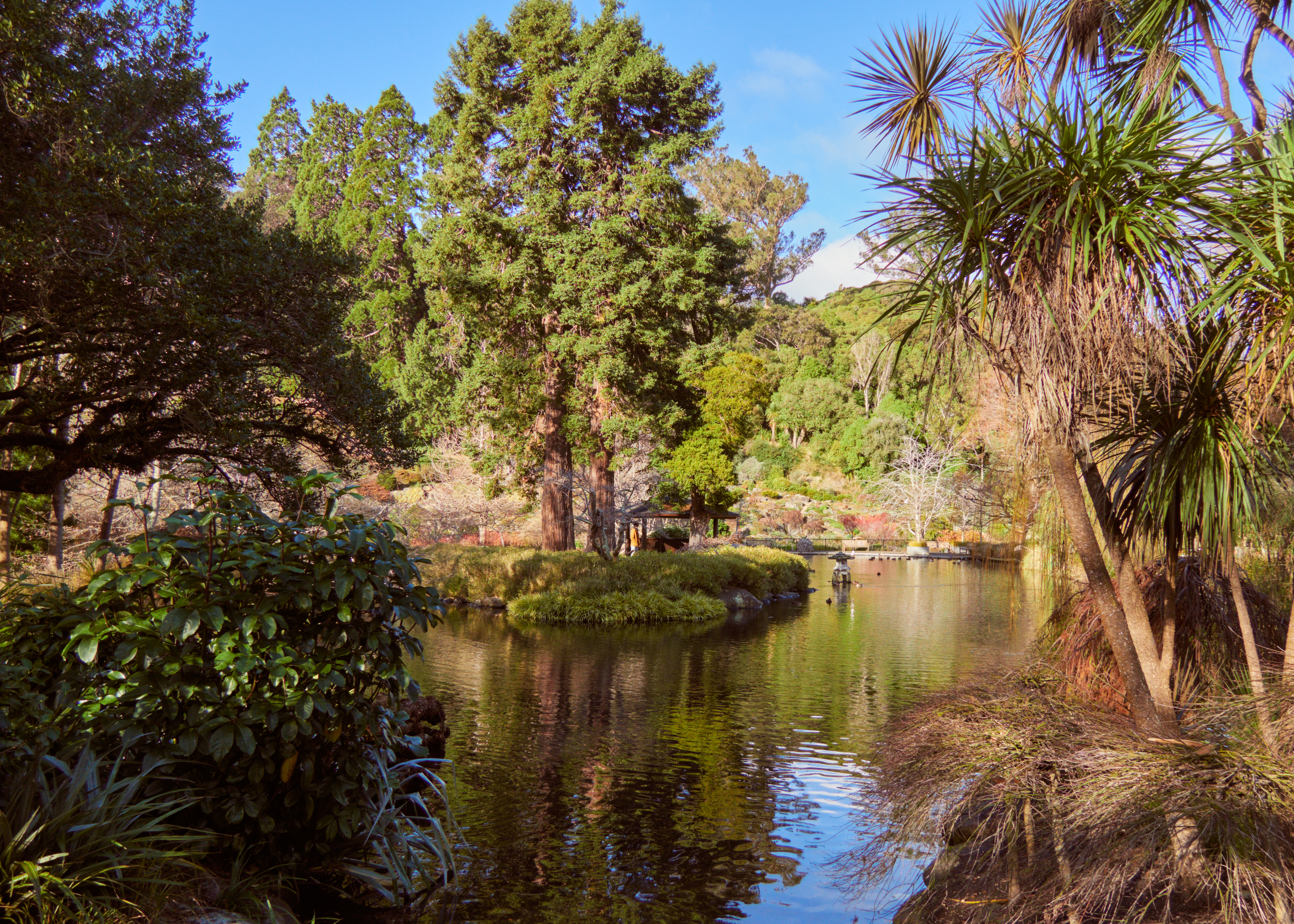
Japanese garden in winter

== See also ==
- Christchurch Botanic Gardens
- Glenfalloch Gardens (Dunedin)
- Larnach Castle and gardens (Dunedin)
- Queenstown Gardens
