= Kensington, Dunedin =

Suburb of Dunedin, New Zealand

Coordinates: 45.8904°S 170.4958°E

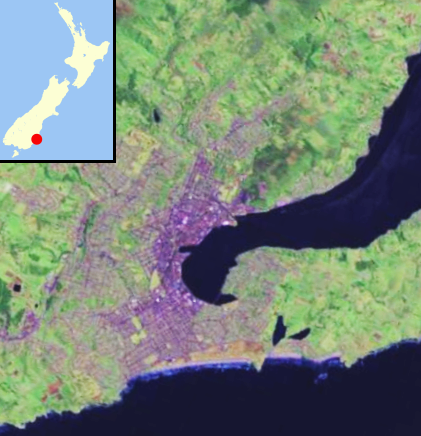
Location of Kensington within Dunedin

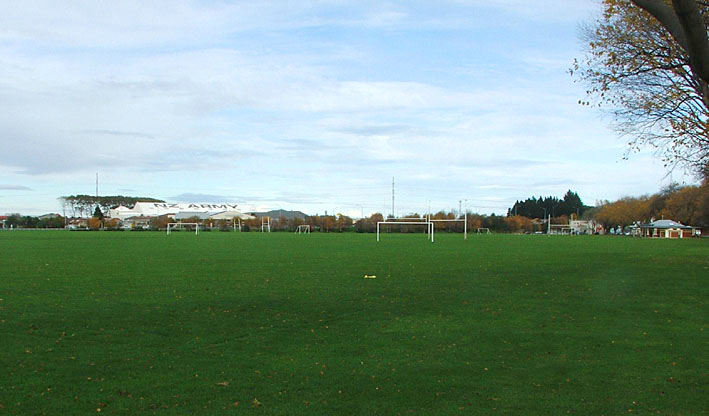
Kensington Oval marks the boundary between Kensington and the central city. In this view, looking towards Kensington, the roof of the Bridgman Street army drill hall is visible in the background.

Kensington is a small suburb of the New Zealand city of Dunedin, nestled to the south of a hilly spur between the central city and the major suburb of South Dunedin, 2.4 kilometres (1.5 mi) to the south of the city centre. The suburb was named for the leafy London suburb, possibly by John Hyde Harris, who subdivided the area in the 1860s.

Kensington is located on and around King Edward Street, close to the point at which it becomes Princes Street. This is one of Dunedin's main arterial routes, with King Edward Street stretching south to become the main road through South Dunedin, and Princes Street heading north to Dunedin's city centre. The suburb lies at the foot of a spur off Maryhill officially referred to as Montecillo Ridge, and close to the inner city sports ground, the Oval. This 9.3-hectare (23-acre) ground, originally called the Southern Recreation Ground, is now referred to as the Kensington Oval, so as to distinguish it from the University Oval in the north of the city. This ground is actually triangular, but at one time contained a separate oval cricket ground, which gave it its name. Dunedin Southern Cemetery sits on the slope of Montecillo Ridge immediately above Kensington, separated from it by South Road, a main route to Caversham, which joins with Princes Street close to the Oval. These two green areas mark the southernmost extreme of Dunedin's Town Belt, which sweeps around the central city in a broad crescent through the suburbs of Mornington, Belleknowes, Roslyn, Maori Hill, Woodhaugh, and Dunedin North.

The lower slopes of Montecillo Ridge were at one time the site of "Hillside", the home of Dunedin city's founding father Captain William Cargill. Though the house is long gone, its name lives on in that of South Dunedin's Hillside Road.

Kensington is largely separated from South Dunedin by an overbridge and railway embankment carrying the South Island Main Trunk railway. The long-closed Kensington railway halt was located immediately to the east of the bridge, and accessed by a flight of stairs in one of the bridge's supports, long since sealed up. A newer flyover 200 metres to the north carries State Highway 1 through Kensington, though there are no slip roads connecting the suburb with the highway. This flyover separates Kensington into two distinct parts, a light industrial zone to the south of the flyover, and a residential zone to the north, at the foot of the ridge.

A notable feature of Kensington is the city's army drill hall, located in Bridgman Street immediately to the south of State Highway 1.
