= George Street =

George Street may refer to:

== People ==
- George Dixon Street (1812–1882), lawyer, judge and political figure in New Brunswick
- George Edmund Street (1824–1881), English architect
- G. S. Street (George Slythe Street) (1867–1936), English critic, journalist and novelist
- George Street (cricketer) (1889–1924), English wicket-keeper
- George L. Street III (1913–2000), submariner in the United States Navy
- George Street (West Virginia politician), member of the West Virginia House of Delegates

== Streets ==
=== Australia ===
- George Street, Brisbane, Queensland
- George Street, Sydney, New South Wales

=== Canada ===
- George Street (St. John's), Newfoundland and Labrador
- George Street, Toronto, Ontario

=== New Zealand ===
- George Street, Dunedin

=== United Kingdom ===
==== England ====
- George Street, Croydon, England, location of George Street tram stop
- George Street, Marylebone, London
- George Street, Oxford
- George Street, Richmond, London

==== Scotland ====
- George Street, Aberdeen
- George Street, Edinburgh

== Bridges ==
- George Street Bridge (disambiguation)

== Other uses ==
- George Street (gang), a street gang in Belize

== See also ==
- George Bridge (disambiguation)
- George (disambiguation)
- King George Street (disambiguation)
