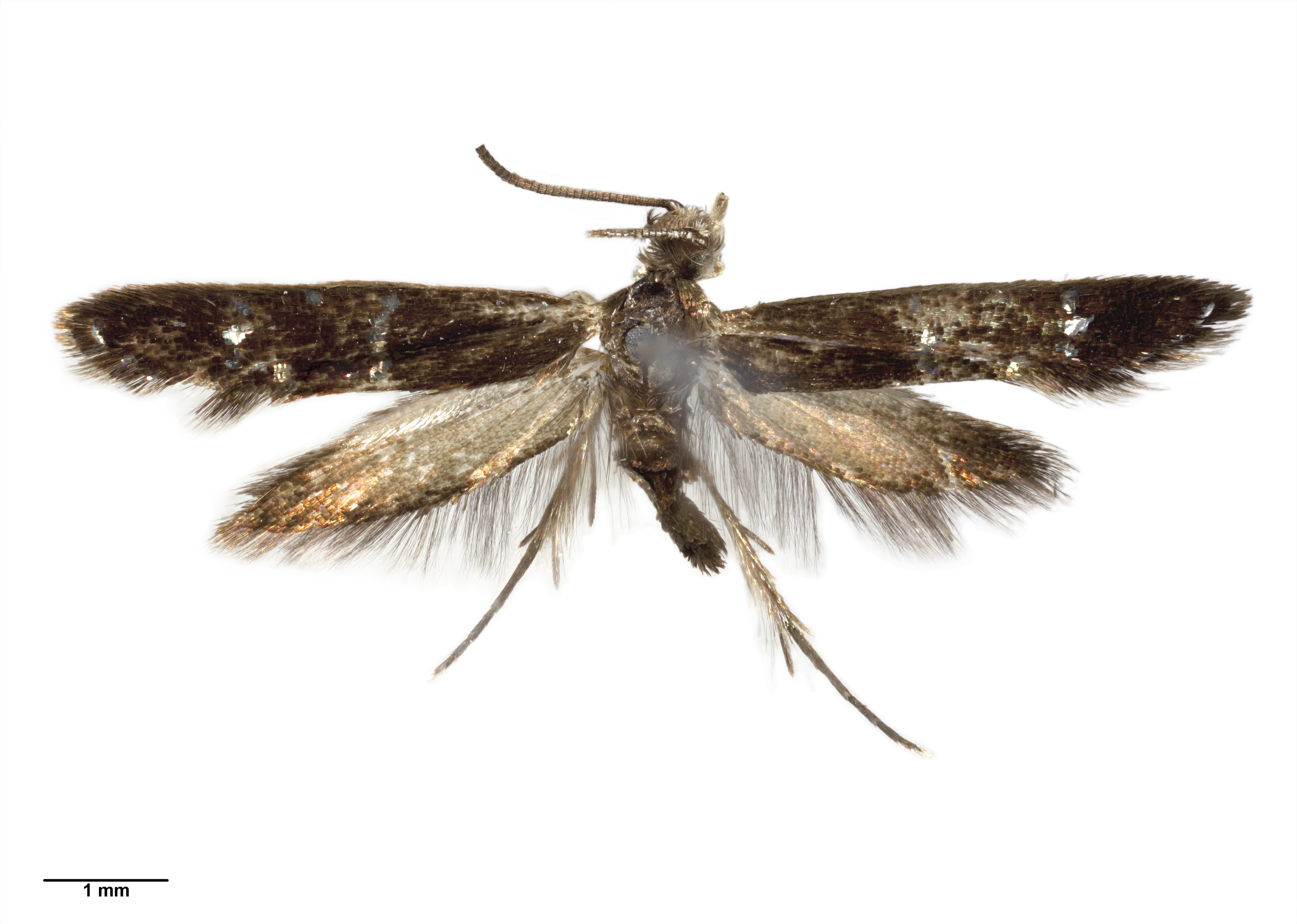
- Male holotype specimen

Scientific classification
- Kingdom: Animalia
- Phylum: Arthropoda
- Clade: Pancrustacea
- Class: Insecta
- Order: Lepidoptera
- Family: Tineidae
- Genus: Astrogenes
- Species: A. insignita

Binomial name
- Astrogenes insignita Philpott, 1930

= Astrogenes insignita =

Species of moth endemic to New Zealand

Astrogenes insignita is a species of moth in the family Tineidae. It was first described by Alfred Philpott in 1930. This species is endemic to New Zealand and has been observed in the North and South Islands.

== Taxonomy ==
This species was first described by Alfred Philpott in 1930 using specimens collected by Charles E. Clarke at Woodhaugh in Dunedin. George Hudson in his 1939 book A supplement to the butterflies and moths of New Zealand treated this species as a synonym of A. chrysograpta. John S. Dugdale in 1988 treated this moth as a separate species. The male holotype and the paratypes are held at the Auckland War Memorial Museum.

== Description ==
Living moth.

Philpott described this species as follows:

♂. 9-10 mm. Head dark greyish fuscous. Palpi whitish. Antennae fuscous grey. Thorax and abdomen bronzy fuscous. Legs greyish fuscous. Forewings moderate, costa hardly arched, apex round-pointed, termen rounded, oblique; bronzy fuscous; a prominent purplish metallic almost straight transverse fascia at before 1/2; a similar but interrupted one at 3/4; a purplish metallic dot at apex: fringes bronzy fuscous. Hindwings purplish fuscous: fringes dark fuscous.

Philpott stated that this species is much smaller than A. chrysograpta and has a different arrangement of the silver markings of the forewing. However Dugdale pointed out that the North Island specimens of A. chrysograpta lack the silver dots on the forewings and therefore look very similar to the holotype specimen of A. insignita.

== Distribution ==
This species is endemic to New Zealand. This species has been observed in both the North and South Islands.
