= 1929 New Zealand cyclone =

New Zealand cyclone

The cyclone of 1929 (also known as the Great Leith flood of 1929) was an unnamed tropical cyclone that struck New Zealand in mid-March 1929 causing widespread flooding and destruction.

== Impact ==
The cyclone brought high winds to the northeast of the country, causing extensive damage in the Bay of Plenty on 18 March, before bringing heavy rain to coastal Canterbury and Otago, causing Dunedin's worst-ever flood.

=== Bay of Plenty ===
Ōpōtiki township suffered one of its most severe gales, with roofs blown off marae buildings and local businesses. Maize crops were flattened, fruit trees were stripped, and many trees were blown over.

=== Hawke's Bay ===
A foal was killed by a flying sheet of iron at Tirohanga.

=== Canterbury ===
Heavy rain was recorded from Christchurch south, with 89 millimetres (3.5 in) falling in Waimate in 24 hours on 19–20 March. There was extensive flooding near the mouth of the Waihao River and around Duntroon. Crops were inundated in several parts of the region, and the South Island Main Trunk Railway was washed out south of Glenavy.

=== Otago ===
There were floods throughout coastal Otago from Dunedin to Oamaru, and inland as far as Clyde. Heavy rainfall was recorded as far south as Balclutha. Burns Creek, inland from Waitati, recorded 224 millimetres (8.8 in) of rain in 24 hours on 19–20 March. Minor flooding occurred around the Kawarau Gorge and Cromwell, and several small creeks in the area became torrents, washing out roads, and severe damage was also caused to roads around Milton. Flooding occurred throughout both the residential and business precincts of Oamaru, and several retaining walls collapsed during the storm. Several houses were evacuated, and there was major damage to the Oamaru Public Gardens.

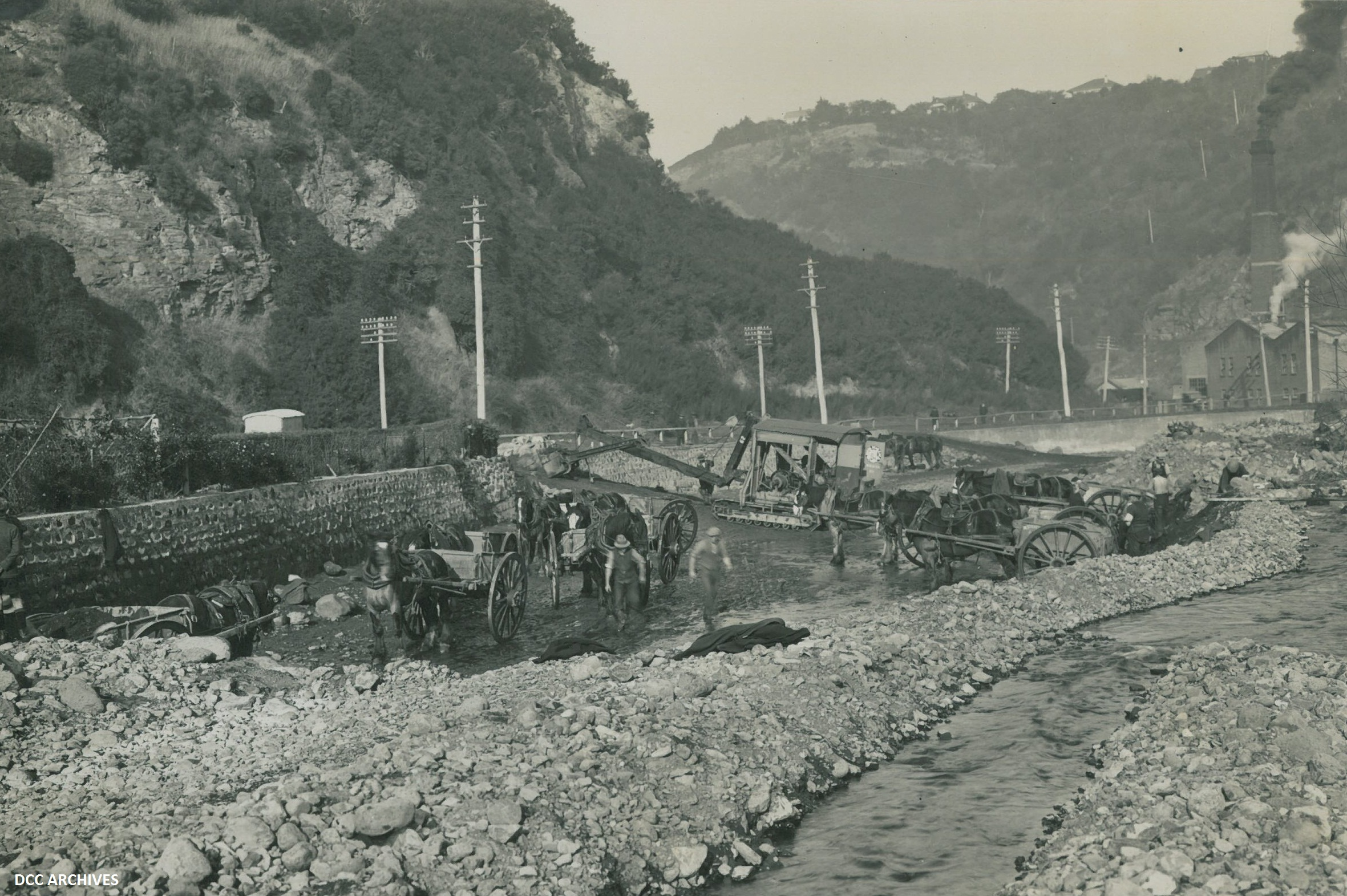
Repairs being undertaken to Malvern Road at Glenleith in the Leith Valley after the 1929 flood.

Rail and other communication links were badly affected, with a railway worker killed as a result of the weather at Salisbury in the Taieri Gorge.

==== Dunedin ====
Heavy rain was recorded around Dunedin, with 139 millimetres (5.5 in) falling at Dunedin Botanical Gardens in 24 hours on 19–20 March. The northern part of Dunedin was inundated by the heaviest flood in the city's history. Many houses were flooded from the city's Exchange area to North East Valley, and many bridges were washed away. Significant damage was done by the undermining of walls, and roadways were washed away entirely in some places. Many business premises in the central city were inundated with water. The Water of Leith changed course, scouring out a new channel (part of which had been an earlier course of the river).

In the southern part of the urban area, 100 houses were flooded from Cargill's Corner to Caversham, with the most badly affected area being around Kensington. The Kaikorai Stream became a torrent, flooding parts of Burnside and Green Island. Throughout the city a total of 506 houses were affected by floodwater. Parts of Otago Peninsula were also isolated as slips blocked many of its roads.

== Deaths ==
At least one person lost his life as a result of the storm. The engine of a goods train from Ranfurly did not stop in time to avoid a washout in the Taieri Gorge. The train's fireman was drowned when the engine fell into the river.

== Aftermath ==
As a result of the storm, the lower reaches of the Water of Leith in Dunedin have now been contained within concrete channels, and the flow is controlled by several small weirs, notably just to the north of Woodhaugh Gardens and at the George Street bridge. The river's concrete channels close to its mouth were also doubled, creating a flood spillway channel. Further work to reduce the Leith's flooding risk was undertaken in the 1950s and 1960s and since the mid-1990s. There has been extensive flood protection work in progress since 2013, which is still ongoing, most recently resulting in the extensive closure of the Dundas St bridge.
