= Woodhaugh Gardens =

Public park and playground in Dunedin, New Zealand

- Interactive map of Woodhaugh Gardens
- Type: Public park and playground
- Location: Woodhaugh, Dunedin, New Zealand
- Coordinates: 45°51′16″S 170°30′44″E
- Established: 1873
- Owned by: Dunedin City Council
- Operated by: Dunedin City Council
- Status: Open
- Facilities: Playground, paddling pool, BBQ facilities, walking tracks

Woodhaugh Gardens is a 12-hectare public park and playground in the suburb of Woodhaugh, Dunedin, New Zealand. Managed by the Dunedin City Council, it forms part of the Dunedin Town Belt and features a significant remnant of ancient kahikatea swamp forest. The gardens provide recreational facilities including a seasonal paddling pool, playgrounds, and walking tracks that link to the wider city green belt.

== Location ==
The frontage of Woodhaugh Gardens is situated at 1081 George Street and along Duke Street in Dunedin North and extends up the Leith Valley. The park begins at the foot of the valley where it meets the city's central plain, and is bordered by the Water of Leith, although recent flood control works have altered the river channel within the gardens. Its position within the Dunedin Town Belt provides scenic connections to the Dunedin Botanic Garden and regional walking routes such as the Ross Creek Reservoir walk.

== History ==
The name "Woodhaugh" is derived from the wooded nature of the area and the Scots word haugh, referring to a meadow by a river. The gardens lie within the Dunedin Town Belt, which was planned in 1848 to preserve a ring of public space around the city.

During the 1850s, the area was utilised for industry, including sawmills and flour mills along the Water of Leith. Formal development as a garden reserve began in 1873, although major landscaping was delayed until 1895, when the council employed local labour to construct pathways and ornamental beds along the river.

Close to the gardens' southeastern edge is the George St Bridge, a historic structure completed in 1903 connecting the central city and the northern suburbs. It was one of the very few bridges crossing the Leith which survived the Great Leith flood of 1929, which also did significant damage to the gardens.

In the mid-20th century, the park was developed into a family-oriented recreation space with the addition of a paddling pool and playground. Landscape modifications were also undertaken as part of flood protection works along the river channel. The Leith passes over two weirs, one just northwest of the gardens and a second at the gardens' southeastern edge.

== Facilities ==
The gardens include several amenities for recreation and nature conservation:

- Playgrounds: Swings, slides, and a flying fox.
- Paddling pool: Seasonal water feature operational during summer months.
- Picnic area: Public electric barbecues and sheltered tables.
- Nature trails: Paths through native forest featuring ancient kahikatea, totara, and rimu.
- Biodiversity: Habitat for native birds including kererū, tūī, and fantail.

== Future development ==
The Dunedin City Council has designated Woodhaugh Gardens as one of three "destination playgrounds" for major modernisation. Under the 2025–2034 Nine-Year Plan, approximately NZ$3.53 million has been provisionally allocated for the redevelopment of the play area, scheduled for design in 2028 and construction in 2029.

Proposed designs focus on a "water, adventure, and woodland" theme, including inclusive play towers, insect hotels, and a modernised water play area.
