= George Street Bridge, Dunedin =

George Street Bridge
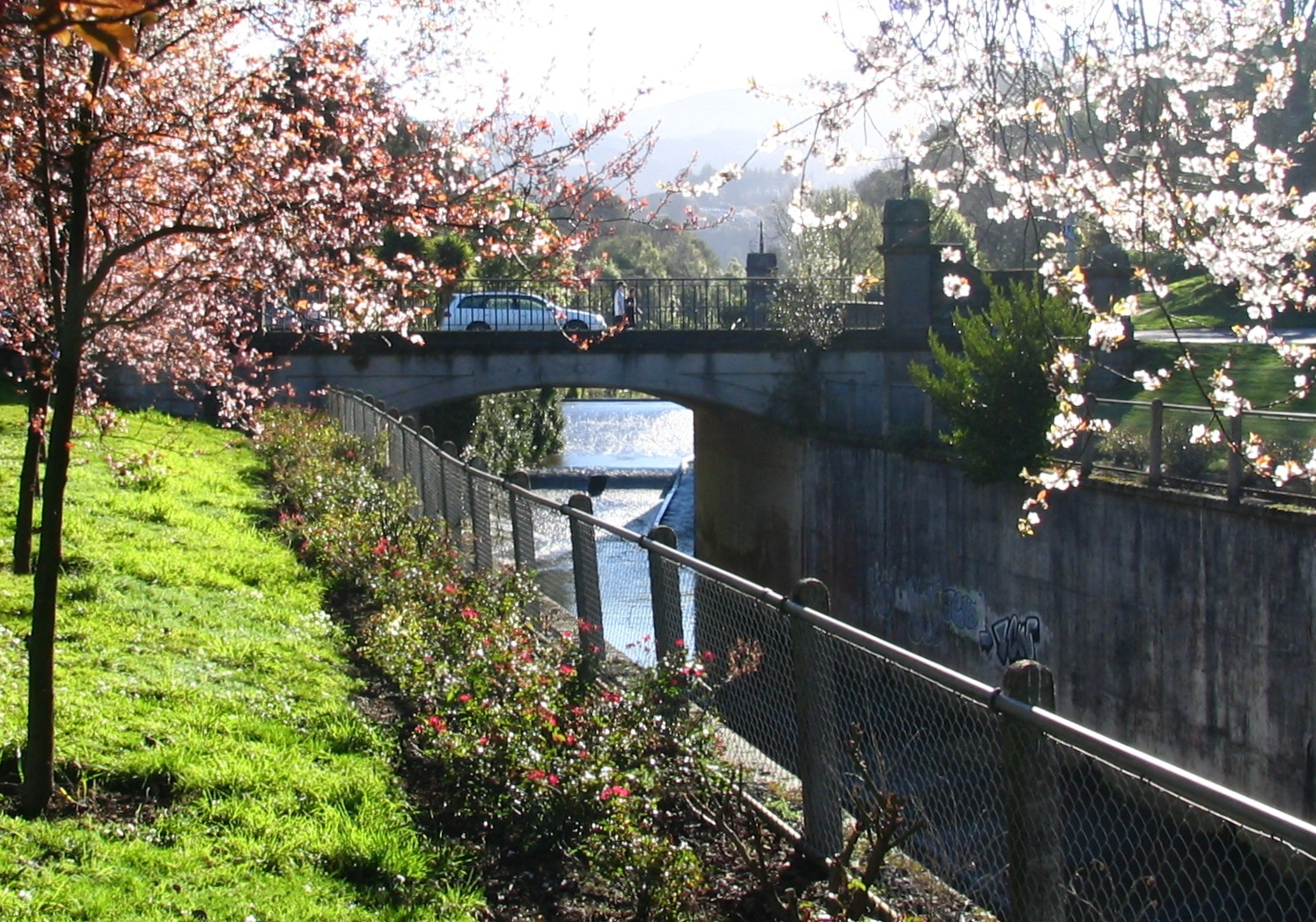
- The historic George Street Bridge crosses the Leith at Woodhaugh Gardens.
- Coordinates: 45°51′17.5″S 170°30′52.0″E
- Locale: Woodhaugh, Dunedin, New Zealand
- Owner: Dunedin City Council

History
- Construction end: 1903
- Inaugurated: 16 December 1903

Location
- Interactive map of George Street Bridge

George Street Bridge is a historic bridge at the north end of George Street, Dunedin, the main street of Dunedin, New Zealand.

The bridge crosses the Water of Leith close to the point where it emerges from Leith Valley and enters the plain upon which most of the city's CBD is situated. The bridge, built in 1903, was one of few in the city to survive disastrous floods in March 1929, after which significant changes were made to the Leith's course, including the addition of a weir immediately upstream of the bridge.

Until the early years of the 20th century, George Street stopped at the banks of the Leith at its northern end. The new bridge allowed for road access between the centre city and northern suburbs, and also initially included a tram line connecting the two areas.

The bridge was the first reinforced concrete arch bridge to be constructed in New Zealand. It is a landmark structure of Dunedin North, located within a historic precinct (Woodhaugh Historic Precinct) at the edge of Woodhaugh Gardens. The bridge was designed by City Engineer John Rogers and built by A. Ferry. The facing of the bridge is of Port Chalmers bluestone (breccia) with South Canterbury granite used for pillar bases. It was decorated with wrought iron railing and lamps (although the latter have since been removed), and the banks of the Leith close to the bridge were planted with ornamental willows.

Simply known as George Street Bridge, it is registered as a Category II historic structure by Heritage New Zealand. It is still a major thoroughfare, linking the northern end of George Street with suburbs such as The Gardens, North East Valley, and Pine Hill.
