= George Street Bridge =

George Street Bridge may refer to:

- George Street Bridge, Newport
- George Street Bridge (Aurora, Indiana)
- George Street Bridge, Dunedin, New Zealand

== See also ==
- George Street (disambiguation)
- George Bridge (disambiguation)
- George (disambiguation)
