= George Bridge (disambiguation) =

George Bridge may refer to:

== People ==
- G.W. Bridge (George Washington Bridge) comics books character
- George Bridge (born 1995) New Zealand rugby union player

== Facilities and Structures ==
- George Washington Bridge, bridge in New York City
  - George Washington Bridge Bus Station
- George IV Bridge, Edinburgh, Scotland, UK; an elevated street
- George V Bridge (disambiguation) or King George V Bridge
- King George VI Bridge, Aberdeen, Scotland, UK; a bridge over the river Dee

== See also ==
- George Bridges (disambiguation)
- George Brydges (disambiguation)
- George Street Bridge (disambiguation)
- George Street (disambiguation)
- George (disambiguation)
- Bridge (disambiguation)
