= King George Street =

King George Street may refer to:

- King George Street (Jerusalem)
- King George Street (Tel Aviv)
- "King George Street" (song)

== See also ==
- George Street (disambiguation)
