= Sullivans Dam =

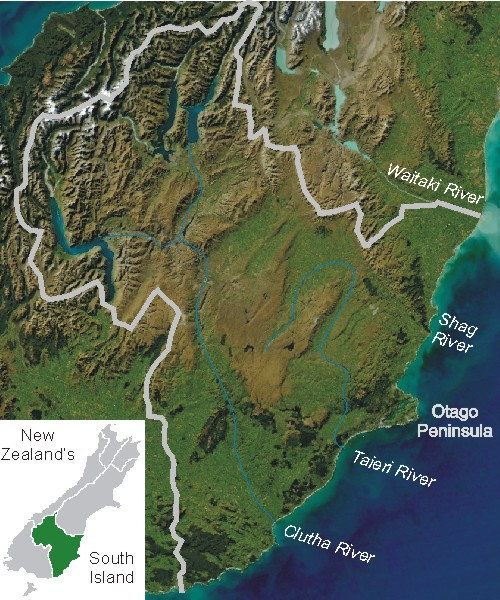
- Location within Otago peninsula
- Location: Dunedin, Otago Region, South Island
- Coordinates: 45°48′25″S 170°31′25″E
- Type: Artificial lake
- Primary outflows: Water of Leith
- Basin countries: New Zealand
- Max. length: 400 metres (1,300 ft)
- Max. width: 180 metres (590 ft)
- Surface area: 6.6 hectares (16 acres)
- Surface elevation: 290 metres (950 ft)

Sullivans Dam (often incorrectly but grammatically referred to as Sullivan's Dam) is a reservoir in a forested area 10 kilometres (6.2 mi) to the north of the centre of Dunedin, New Zealand.

The dam is located to the east of Mount Cargill, close to the Dunedin Northern Motorway in the upper Leith Valley, some 500 metres southeast of the Leith Saddle. It was proposed in 1909 by City Councillor Archibald J. Sullivan (1869–1932), after whom it is named, in order to expand Dunedin's water supply. Work began in May 1913 and the reservoir was officially opened on 15 July 1916.

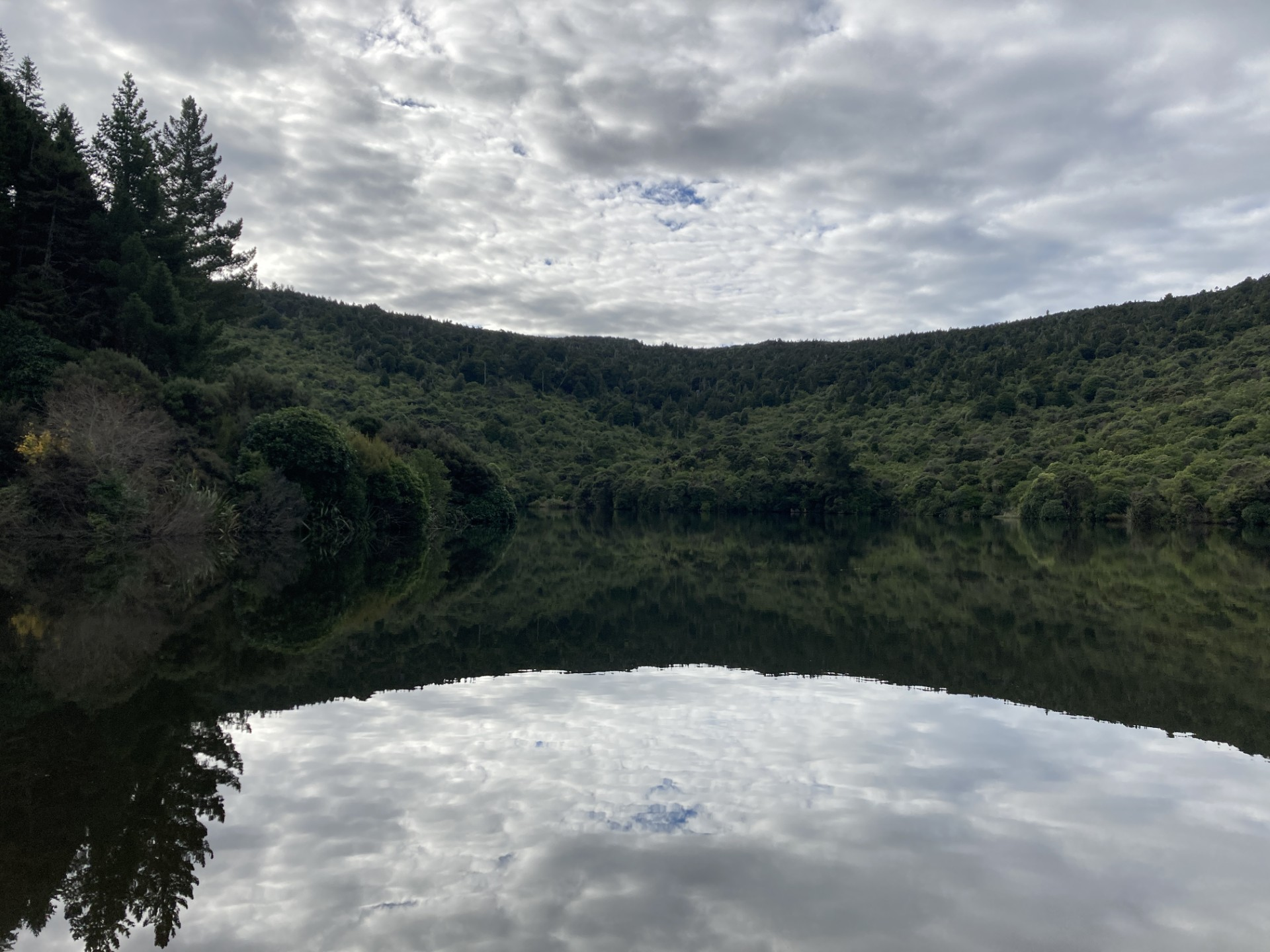
View of Sullivans Dam

The surrounding catchment area is today a popular site for walkers, with numerous bush walks around the reservoir. The reservoir was also stocked with trout shortly after its completion, and stocks of the fish are periodically replenished. As such, the reservoir provides popular sport for anglers.
