= Brydges =

Brydges is a surname. Notable people with the surname include:

- David Brydges (born 1949), English-American-Canadian mathematical physicist
- Elizabeth Brydges (c. 1575–1617), English courtier
- George Brydges (disambiguation)
- Grey Brydges, 5th Baron Chandos (ca. 1580–1621), English nobleman
- Henry Brydges (disambiguation)
- James Brydges (disambiguation)
- John Brydges, 1st Baron Chandos (1492–1557), English Member of Parliament
- Samuel Egerton Brydges (1762–1837), English bibliographer and genealogist

== See also ==
- Harford Jones-Brydges (1764–1847), British diplomat and author
- Bridges (surname)
