= Elizabeth Dreaver =

Milliner and draper in Dunedin, New Zealand

Elizabeth Creilman Dreaver (née McHoul c. 1848 – 30 November 1934) was a pioneering milliner and draper in Dunedin, New Zealand.

Dreaver was born in Glasgow circa 1848, the daughter of Elizabeth McHoul, née Creelman [sic], and boat builder Hugh McHoul.

She worked as a domestic servant, and emigrated to Otago in 1870 aboard the Robert Henderson.

Dreaver married James Dreaver, a tailor, originally from Orkney, in 1873 at St Andrew's Presbyterian Church in Dunedin. James's short-lived tailoring business had been destroyed by fire in 1865, and he subsequently opened a toy and fancy goods store. In 1878 Elizabeth opened the Red Flag Drapery on George Street, although the name was soon dropped and it became known as Mrs Dreaver's. A fire in 1878 destroyed eight buildings on George Street, including the Dreavers' building. In February the following year, the Dreavers opened a new brick building, with three shops and apartments above, built by Finck & Grasby, and designed by William Grasby.

The shop carried dresses, jackets, skirts, and children's wear, had its own dressmaking department offering service within a matter of hours, and offered a parcel post service to rural customers. The new buildings included a dressmaking workshop behind the premises.

In 1885 Dreaver spent five months in Scotland for her "bad health", and on her return brought with her stock from London and Paris. She also brought a new pattern-cutting system. Dreaver was Otago's sole agent for the American Scientific System of Dresscutting, and taught the system at Otago Girls' High School. Dreaver was one of the first drapers in New Zealand to sell the Butterick pattern books. Dreaver expanded the drapery to include all three shops in the Dreaver buildings in 1904, and eventually included a hairdresser and beauty salon.

James Dreaver died 1 January 1905, but Dreaver continued to run the business until becoming ill in September 1934. Dreaver died at her home in Clyde Street, Dunedin, on 30 November 1934, aged 86. She was survived by two daughters and two sons. The business continued to be run by the family, but ceased trading in 1953.

== Dreavers buildings ==
Dreavers buildings on George Street have had multiple tenants, including a ladies' seminary, McQueen's hairdressing (1883–1903), Bon Marche children's clothing shop (opened 1898), after which in 1904 the drapery expanded to fill all three shops. Other tenants included Hans Pauli, who purchased James Dreaver's fancy goods business and ran it until 1892.

New shop fronts were built by the Fletcher Construction Company in 1925, incorporating recessed arched entrances, and decorative tiles forming "Dreavers Ltd" at the entrance, and decorative glass.

After the closure of Dreavers drapery, the buildings were occupied by the Bruce Shop (an outlet for Bruce Woollens), the Otago Sports Depot, a Queen Anne Chocolate (Ernest Adams) shop, Ace Alterations, Martins Art Furnishers, Don Kindley Real Estate, Brent Weatherall Jewellers and the $ n' Sense dollar store.
