= James Brydges =

James Brydges may refer to:

- James Brydges, 8th Baron Chandos (1642–1714), English Ambassador to the Ottoman Empire
- James Brydges, 1st Duke of Chandos (1673–1744), English landowner and politician
- James Brydges, 3rd Duke of Chandos (1731–1789), English peer and politician

== See also ==
- James Bridges (disambiguation)
- Brydges (surname)
