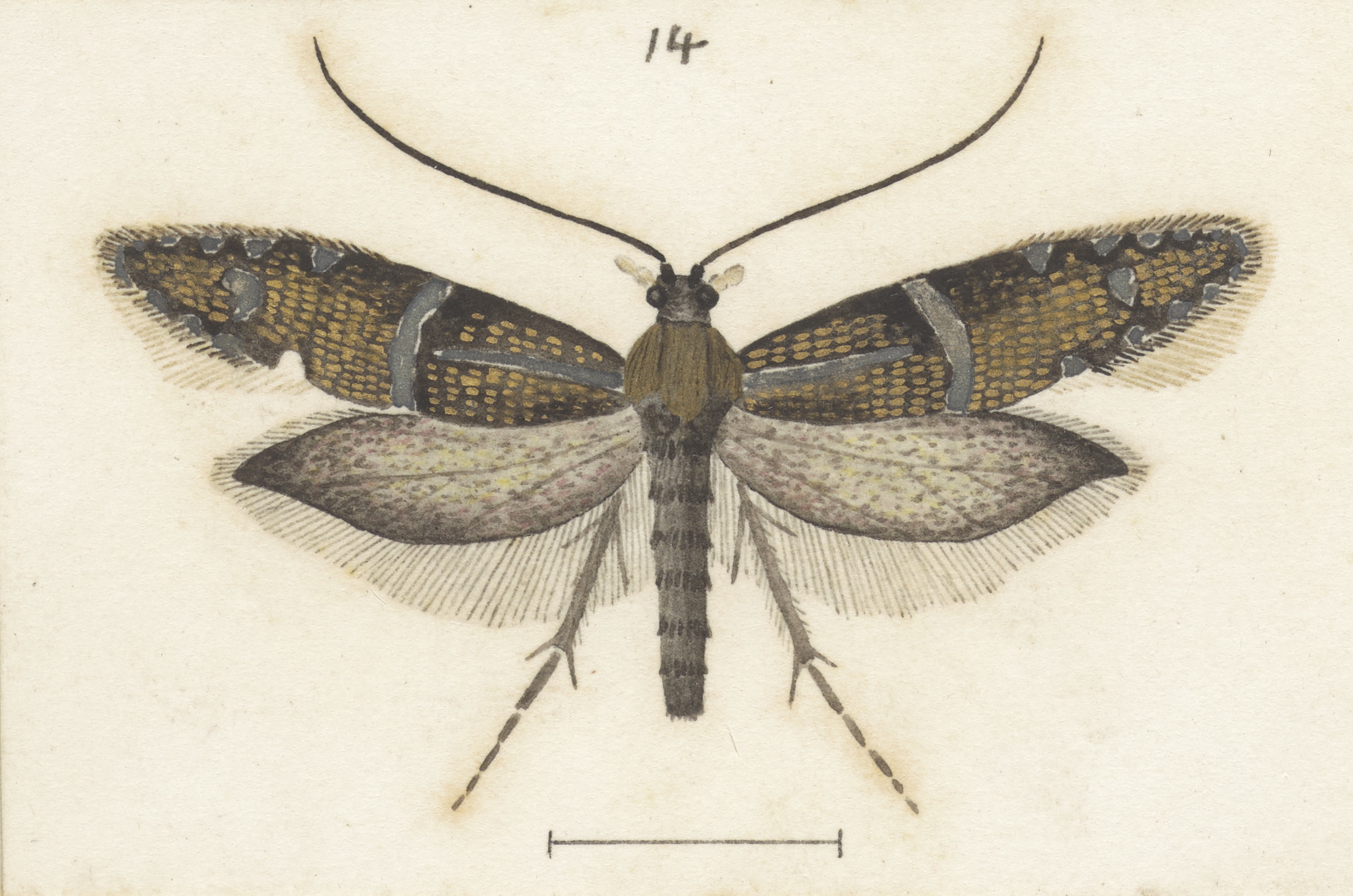
- Illustration of male

Scientific classification
- Kingdom: Animalia
- Phylum: Arthropoda
- Clade: Pancrustacea
- Class: Insecta
- Order: Lepidoptera
- Family: Tineidae
- Genus: Astrogenes
- Species: A. chrysograpta

Binomial name
- Astrogenes chrysograpta Meyrick, 1921

= Astrogenes chrysograpta =

Species of moth endemic to New Zealand

Astrogenes chrysograpta is a species of moth in the family Tineidae. It was first described by Edward Meyrick in 1921. This species is endemic to New Zealand and has been observed in the North and South Islands.

== Taxonomy ==
This species was first described by Edward Meyrick in 1921 using a specimen collected by Stella Hudson on Mount Arthur at 4,200 feet (1,300 m) in January. George Hudson discussed and illustrated this species in his 1928 book The butterflies and moths of New Zealand. In 1939 Hudson argued that the validity of A. insignita as a distinct species was in doubt. However John S. Dugdale recognised both species in 1988 in his publication Lepidoptera - annotated catalogue, and keys to family-group taxa. The male holotype is held at the Natural History Museum, London.

== Description ==
Meyrick described this species as follows:

♂. 13mm. Head, thorax, and abdomen dark fuscous. Palpi whitish, anterior surface forming a strong black streak with whitish edges. Fore-wings elongate, rather narrow, costa gently arched, apex obtuse, termen extremely obliquely rounded; dark bronzy-fuscous, with some bronzy suffusion in disc posteriorly ; markings pale golden-metallic; a slender streak along basal half of fold; a slightly excurved transverse line before middle ; five transverse dots on posterior half of costa, second confluent with a transverse mark in disc; a transverse mark from dorsum before tornus ; a small transverse apical spot: cilia light greyish, with dark-fuscous subbasal shade, and within this some golden-metallic basal marks. Hind-wings dark purple-grey ; cilia grey.

Dugdale pointed out that North Island specimens of this species lack the silver dots on the forewings and therefore look very similar to the holotype specimen of A. insignita.

== Distribution ==
This species is endemic to New Zealand. It has been observed in the North and South Islands.

== Habitat ==
A. chrysograpta inhabits native forest and also open grass habitat above the treeline in mountainous areas.

== Behaviour ==
Adults are most commonly observed on the wing in January.
