= James Bridges (disambiguation) =

James Bridges (1936–1993) was an American screenwriter and film director.

James Bridges may also refer to:

- James Bridges (architect) (c.1725–1763), English architect and civil engineer
- James Whiteside Bridges (1863–1930), head of the Canadian military medical service
- Jimmy Bridges (cricketer) (1887–1966), English cricketer
- Jimmy Bridges (actor) (born 1960), American actor
- Jim Bridges (born 1951), American bobsledder

== See also ==
- James Brydges (disambiguation)
