= George Bridges =

George Bridges may refer to:

- George Bridges (politician) (c. 1762–1840), Lord Mayor of London and MP for London
- Tom Bridges (1871–1939, actual first name was George), British military officer and Governor of South Australia
- George Rodney Bridges (died 1714), MP for Haslemere and Winchester
- George William Bridges (1678–1751), MP for Whitchurch and Winchester
- George Washington Bridges (1825–1873), American politician
- George Wilson Bridges (1788–1863), writer, photographer and Anglican cleric
- Sir George Talbot Bridges, 8th Baronet (1818–1899) of the Bridges baronets
- George Bridges, Baron Bridges of Headley (born 1970), British politician
- George Sumner Bridges (born 1950), American sociologist and president of Evergreen State College

== See also ==
- George Bridge (disambiguation)
- George Brydges (disambiguation)
- Bridges (disambiguation)
