= Astrogenes =

Scientific classification
- Kingdom: Animalia
- Phylum: Arthropoda
- Clade: Pancrustacea
- Class: Insecta
- Order: Lepidoptera
- Family: Tineidae
- Genus: Astrogenes; Meyrick, 1921

Genus of moths

Astrogenes is a genus of moths belonging to the family Tineidae.

== Species ==
- Astrogenes chrysograpta Meyrick, 1921
- Astrogenes insignata Philpott, 1930
