= Ross Creek Reservoir =

Reservoir in Dunedin, New Zealand

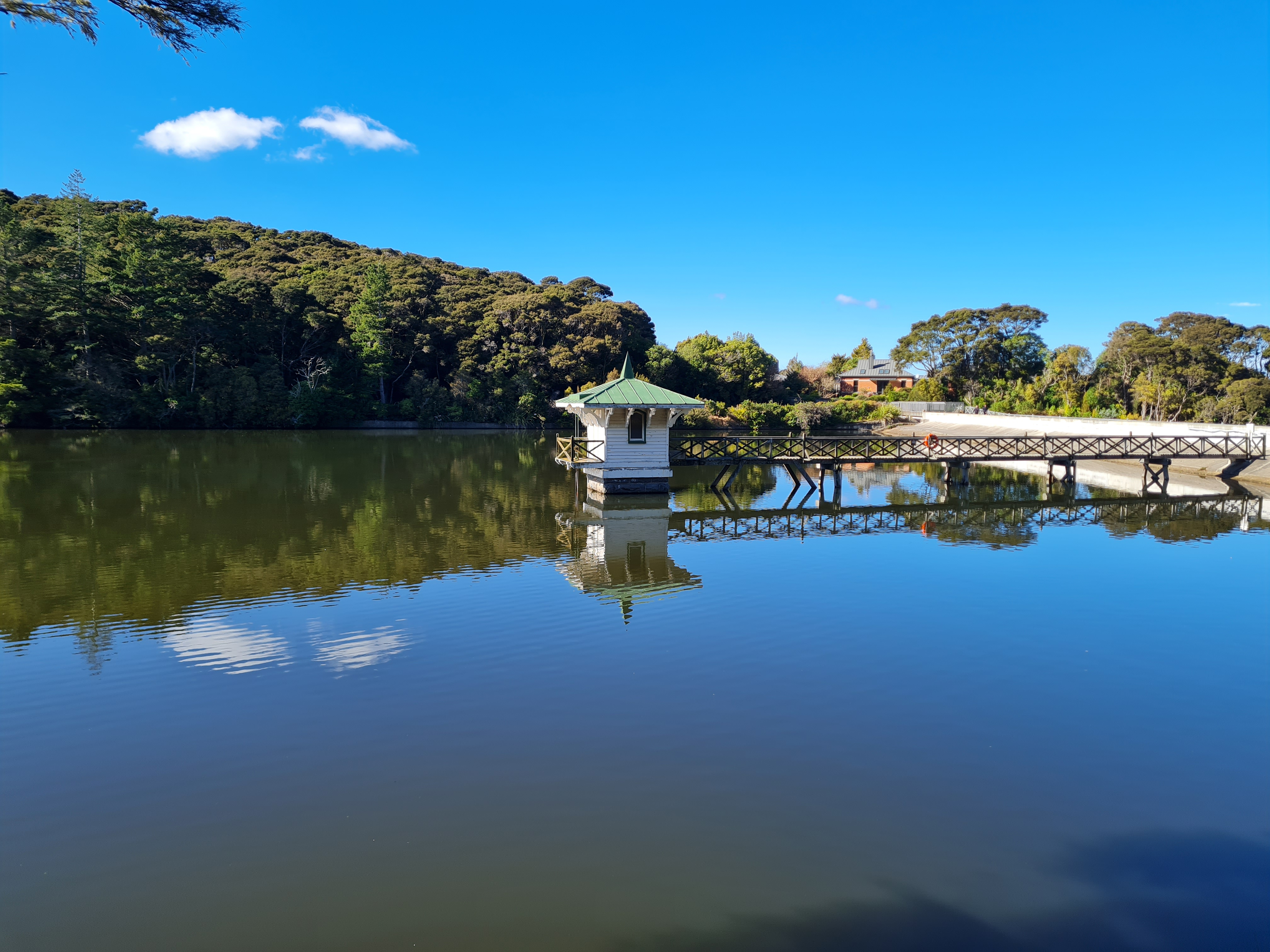
- Ross Creek Reservoir dam and valve tower in 2025
- Interactive map of Ross Creek Reservoir
- Location: Dunedin, South Island
- Coordinates: 45.8471°S 170.4986°E
- Type: reservoir
- Primary inflows: Ross Creek, Wakari Creek
- Primary outflows: Ross Creek
- Basin countries: New Zealand
- Max. length: approx. 350 m (1,150 ft)
- Max. width: approx. 80 m (260 ft)
- Average depth: 30 m (98 ft)
- Water volume: 162,000 m^{3} (131 acre⋅ft)
- Surface elevation: 115 metres (377 ft) ASL
- Settlements: Dunedin

The Ross Creek Reservoir is an artificial lake in the Ross Creek Reserve, Dunedin, New Zealand. One of the oldest artificial lakes in the country, and the oldest water supply reservoir still in use in the country, it was created in the 1860s to provide water for the city of Dunedin, at that time in the middle of rapid expansion due to the Otago gold rush. Designed by engineer Ralph Donkin and supervising builder David Proudfoot, the reservoir was opened in 1867 as the Royal Albert Reservoir, but the name was unpopular and it has been known as the Ross Creek Reservoir for over a century.

The reservoir, dams, and picturesque valve tower have a New Zealand Historic Places Trust Level I classification.

The reservoir is located in a heavily wooded valley in the suburb of Glenleith, four kilometres north of the city centre. Fed by a small stream, the Ross Creek — a tributary of the Water of Leith — it is held behind two small dams, 23 metres and 10 metres in height. The base of the larger dam is 95 metres above sea level, with the water surface at approximately 115 metres ASL.

== Ross Creek Reserve ==
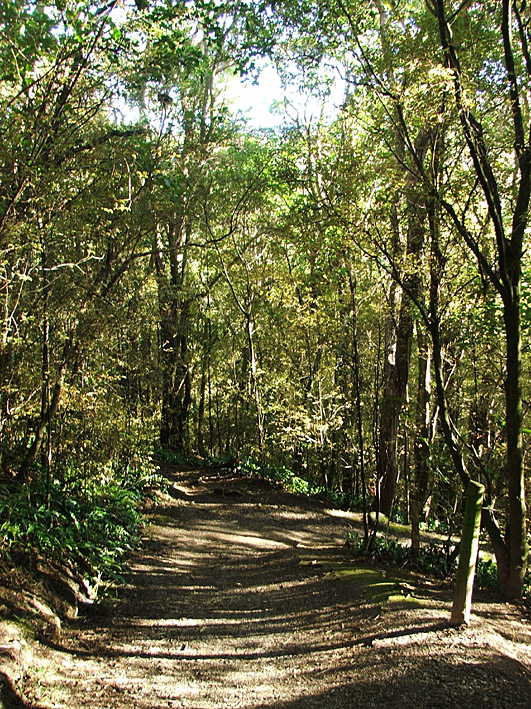
Bush tracks surround the reservoir.

The reservoir is surrounded by a public reserve which has been allowed to regenerate with native bush. Though not technically covered by the New Zealand Reserves Act, the area is referred to as a reserve and managed and maintained as such by the Dunedin City Council, by virtue of its high scenic and recreational value. This lies between Tanner and Rockside Roads in Glenleith and Cannington Road in Maori Hill. The winding Burma Road runs through the reserve to the north and west of the reservoir. One of Dunedin's most popular golf courses, Balmacewen Golf Course, abuts the reserve's southwest corner. The highest point in the reserve, in its northeastern corner close to Tanner Road, is some 190 metres (620 ft) above sea level.

Numerous popular walking tracks lead to and circle the reservoir, and follow the course of the Ross Creek and its tributary, School Creek. Track counters have recorded as many as 4,000 walkers on the tracks per month, making them some of Dunedin's most well-used bush walks. The tracks are marked with stone markers, and a permanent orienteering course is also marked numbered posts. The walks can be entered from various points along Burma and Tanner Roads, but the main entry is from lower down Ross Creek at Glenleith. A further track links the reserve with a walkway which follows the course of the Water of Leith past a former quarry to link with tracks which run through Woodhaugh Gardens at the mouth of the Leith Valley 0.9 kilometres (0.56 mi) to the southeast.

Notable features of the reserve — other than the reservoir — include a waterfall which cascades some 20 metres (66 ft) into School Creek. Though these falls appear completely natural, they were created by the diversion of Ross Creek to form the reservoir, and now carry waters from the creek's flood channel. The lower parts of the reserve's tracks close to Glenleith are also notable, as they pass through the narrowest part of the Ross Creek's valley, which rises as canyon walls on both sides of the track and creek. A highway linking the Dunedin Northern Motorway with Kaikorai Valley was planned in the 1970s to be built through this valley and across the adjacent golf course; an idea long since abandoned.

== Gallery ==
The School Creek Waterfall was created when the waters of Ross Creek were diverted during construction of the reservoir.

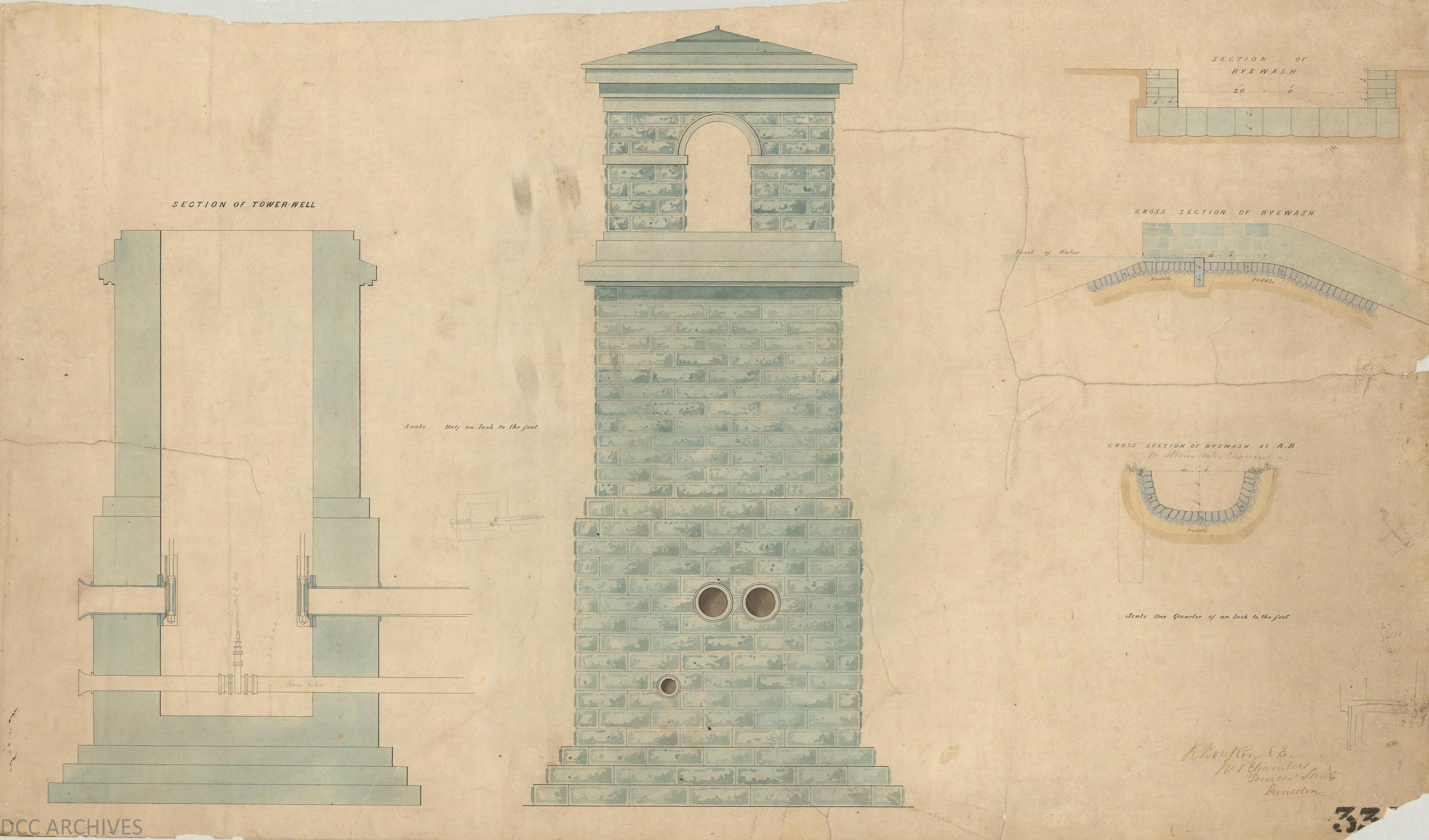
Reservoir valve tower

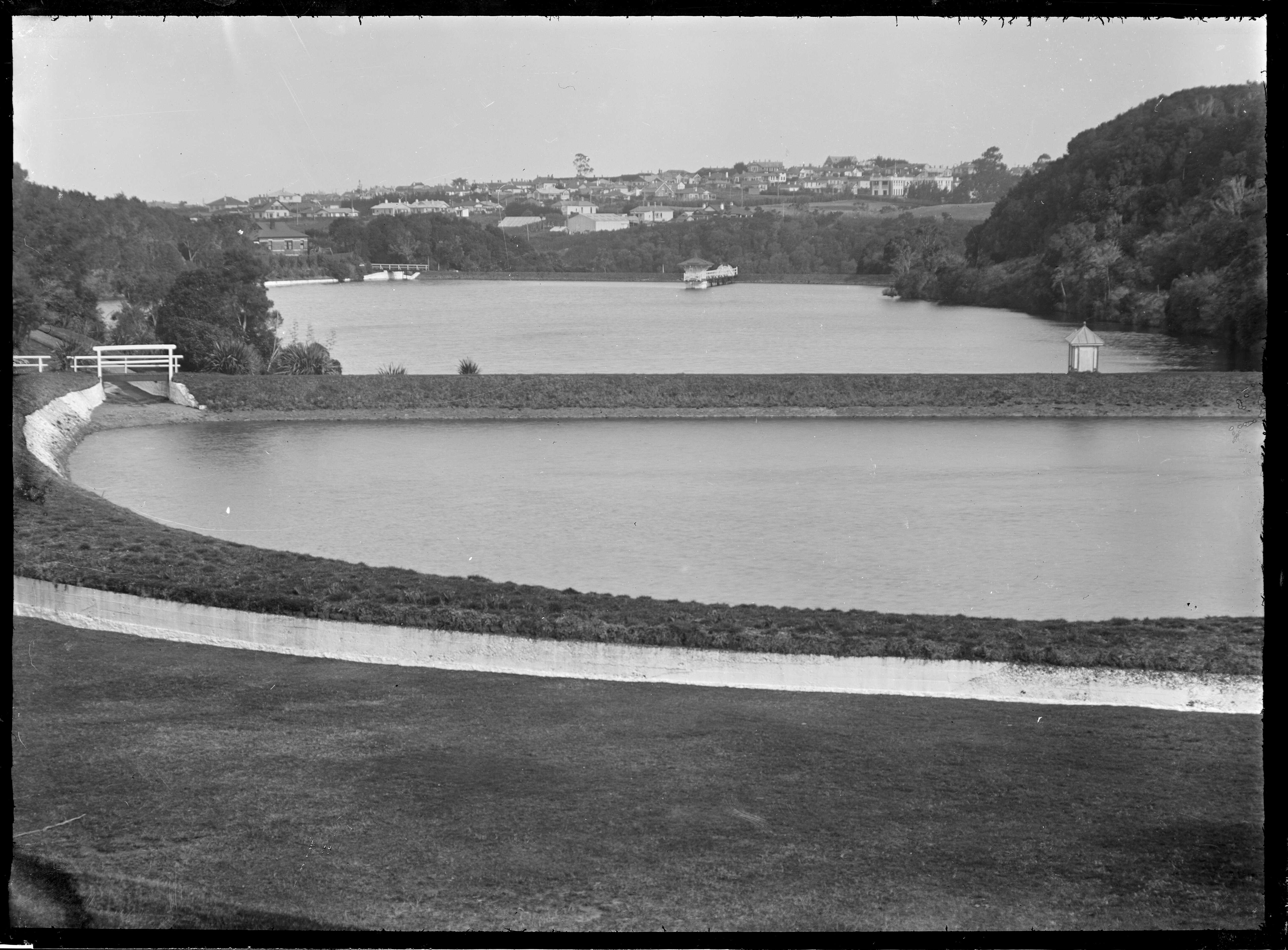
Ross Reservoir, Dunedin (1925)

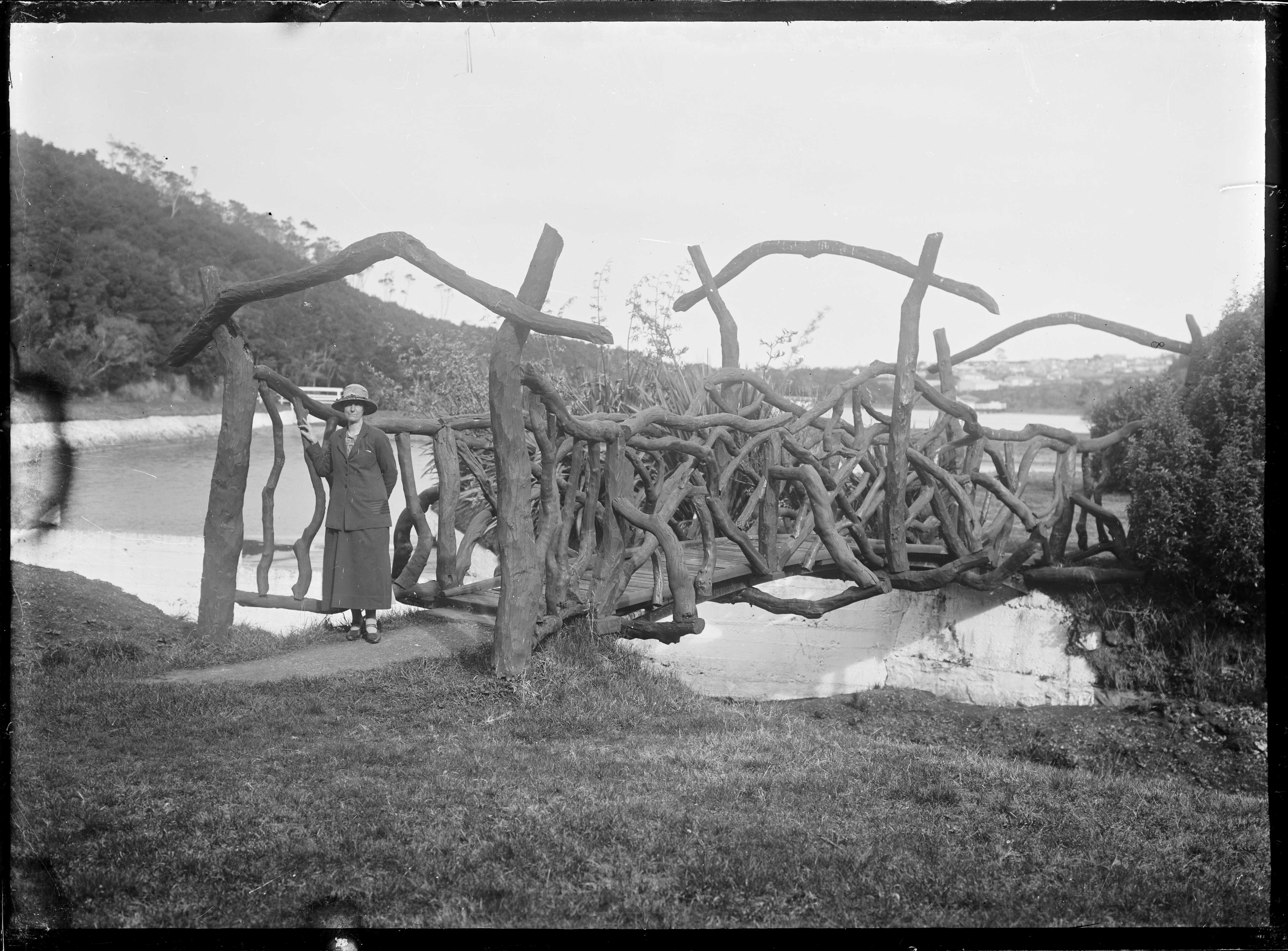
Rustic bridge at Ross Reservoir, Dunedin (1925)
