= George Brydges =

George Brydges may refer to:

- George Rodney Brydges (died 1714), MP for Winchester and Haslemere
- George William Brydges (1678–1751), MP for Winchester and Whitchurch
- George Brydges, 6th Baron Chandos (1620–1655), supporter of Charles I of England

== See also ==
- George Bridges (disambiguation)
- George Bridge (disambiguation)
- Brydges
