= Maori Hill =

Suburb of Dunedin, New Zealand

- Suburb
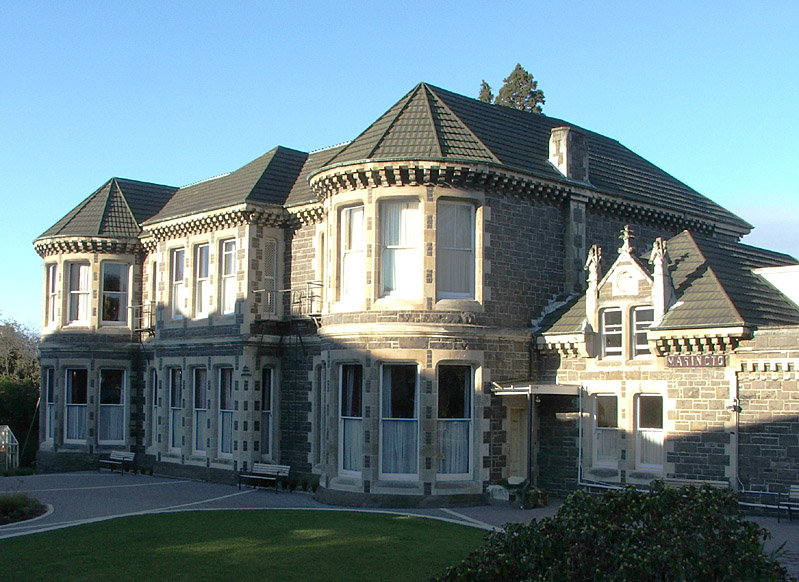
- Marinoto, part of the Mercy Hospital complex, is one of Maori Hill's major landmarks
- Interactive map of Maori Hill
- Coordinates: 45.8585°S 170.5003°E
- Country: New Zealand
- City: Dunedin
- Local authority: Dunedin City Council

Area
  - Land: 101 ha (250 acres)

Population (June 2025)
  - Total: 2,400
  - Density: 2,400/km^{2} (6,200/sq mi)

Helensburgh	Glenleith	Pine Hill
Wakari	Maori Hill	The Gardens
	Roslyn	Dunedin North

Maori Hill is a residential suburb of the New Zealand city of Dunedin. It is located at the northern end of the ridge which runs in a crescent around the central city's western edge, 2 kilometres (1.2 mi) to the northwest of the city centre, immediately above and within the Town Belt. It is connected to Dunedin North, which lies to the east, via Drivers Road, the suburbs of Roslyn and Kaikorai to the southwest via Highgate, and the suburb of Wakari to the northwest via Balmacewen Road.

In the northeast of the suburb lies the recreational ground of Prospect Park, and this part of Maori Hill is also often known by this name. From Prospect Park, views across the lower Leith Valley can be obtained, as the park sits close to the edge of cliffs which rise above the broad canyon at Woodhaugh. A steep walking track, the Bullock Track, links the two suburbs.

Maori Hill is regarded as one of the city's wealthier and more exclusive suburbs, and contains many fine houses, especially in the maze of winding streets which run through the bush-clad slopes of the Town Belt. These houses include the historic manor Olveston, which has been owned by the city and open to the public since the 1960s. Unlike neighbouring hill suburbs like Roslyn, Maori Hill was not served by a cable car, possibly underlying its greater degree of exclusivity.

Notable features of Maori Hill include the Balmacewen Golf Course, home of the Otago Golf Club, in the suburb's northwest. This is one of New Zealand's oldest and finest courses. A state integrated Presbyterian boys' secondary school, John McGlashan College, is located close to the golf course. To the southeast of the course lies a recreation ground, Bishopscourt, and nearby is Balmacewen Intermediate School. As with Prospect Park, this area is often referred to as a separate suburb, Balmacewen, named after the residence of early settler John McGlashan, whose wife's maiden name was McEwen. To the northwest of the golf course is an area of scenic reserve which surrounds the Ross Creek Reservoir in Glenleith. Several popular walking tracks lead down to the reservoir from Cannington Road, which marks the northern edge of Maori Hill.

Other schools in Maori Hill include Maori Hill School, a state primary school. On the Roslyn/Kaikorai/Maori Hill border is Columba College, a state integrated Presbyterian girls secondary school, with a coeducational Junior (primary) school.

Maori Hill contains the city's largest private hospitals. Formerly known as the Mater Misericordiae, it is now the Mercy Hospital, and contains as part of its complex the Marinoto Clinic. This is located on Newington Avenue, one of several streets which wind down into the Town Belt from Highgate. The hospital is built around Marinoto, the former home of the Sargood family and now one of the hospital's major buildings.

== Etymology ==
The name Maori Hill is conventionally believed to have been in reference to a traditional Māori path (Kā ara tūpuna) that ran through the area towards the Taieri Plain, but this is unconfirmed. There is a common misconception that the name is in reference to Taranaki Māori prisoners who were forced to labour on civic projects throughout the city. The nearby Maori Road, running through the Dunedin Town Belt, was constructed by and named for the Taranaki prisoners. However, the name Maori Hill has been in use since at least 1857, while the first Taranaki prisoners, from the Te Pakakohi iwi, were brought to Dunedin in 1869.

== Demographics ==
Maori Hill covers 1.01 km^{2} (0.39 sq mi) and had an estimated population of 2,400 as of June 2025, with a population density of 2,376 people per km^{2}.

Historical population
Year	Pop.	±% p.a.
2006	2,328	—
2013	2,367	+0.24%
2018	2,448	+0.68%

Maori Hill had a population of 2,448 at the 2018 New Zealand census, an increase of 81 people (3.4%) since the 2013 census, and an increase of 120 people (5.2%) since the 2006 census. There were 924 households, comprising 1,146 males and 1,305 females, giving a sex ratio of 0.88 males per female. The median age was 44.6 years (compared with 37.4 years nationally), with 444 people (18.1%) aged under 15 years, 510 (20.8%) aged 15 to 29, 1,029 (42.0%) aged 30 to 64, and 465 (19.0%) aged 65 or older.

Ethnicities were 87.4% European/Pākehā, 6.2% Māori, 1.3% Pasifika, 11.2% Asian, and 1.8% other ethnicities. People may identify with more than one ethnicity.

The percentage of people born overseas was 26.6, compared with 27.1% nationally.

Although some people chose not to answer the census's question about religious affiliation, 49.3% had no religion, 42.0% were Christian, 0.9% were Hindu, 0.6% were Muslim, 0.9% were Buddhist and 1.1% had other religions.

Of those at least 15 years old, 1,026 (51.2%) people had a bachelor's or higher degree, and 150 (7.5%) people had no formal qualifications. The median income was $37,700, compared with $31,800 nationally. 597 people (29.8%) earned over $70,000 compared to 17.2% nationally. The employment status of those at least 15 was that 870 (43.4%) people were employed full-time, 363 (18.1%) were part-time, and 66 (3.3%) were unemployed.

== Education ==
Maori Hill School is a state contributing primary school for Year 1 to 6 students, with a roll of 214 students. The school started in 1906, and moved to its current site in 1977.

John McGlashan College is a state-integrated boys secondary school for Year 7 to 13 students, with a roll of 525 students. It opened in 1918 as a private Presbyterian college. and integrated into the state system in 1989.

Rolls are as of March 2026.
