= Dunedin Town Belt =

Green belt in Dunedin, New Zealand

Coordinates: 45.87°S 170.5°E

Town Belt
- Dunedin Town Belt
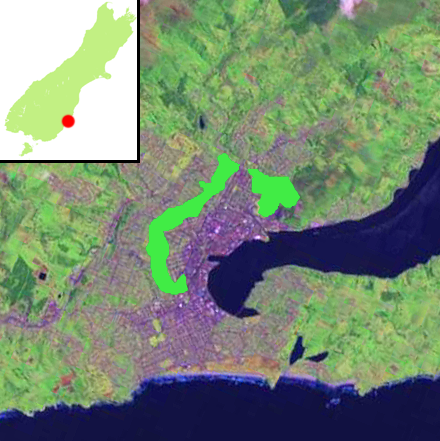
- Approximate extent of Dunedin's Town Belt, shown in green
- Interactive map of Town Belt
- Location: Dunedin, Otago, New Zealand
- Area: 200 hectares (490 acres)
- Operator: Dunedin City Council
- Open: Yes
- Status: Municipal reserve

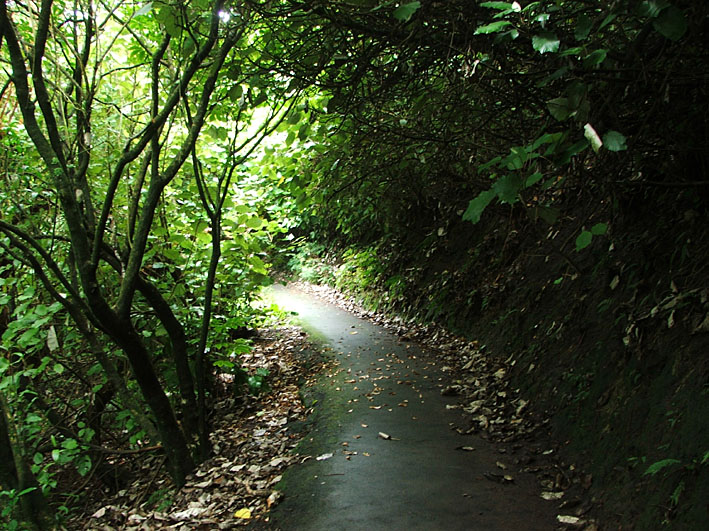
Dunedin Town Belt includes both densely forested areas...

The Town Belt is a green belt which surrounds the centre of the New Zealand city of Dunedin. Covering a total of over 200 hectares (490 acres), it extends around three sides of the city's centre at a distance from it of some 1–3 km (0.62–1.86 mi) in a broad 7 km (4.3 mi) crescent from the Oval at Kensington in the south through the suburbs of Mornington, City Rise, Belleknowes, Roslyn, Maori Hill, Prospect Park, Glenleith, Woodhaugh, The Gardens and Dunedin North and the slopes of Signal Hill. The fourth side of the central city is bounded by the Otago Harbour.

One of the world's oldest green belts, the Town Belt was planned in Scotland at the time of the advent of the Otago settlement in 1848. Residential areas outside the belt became separate boroughs, and were not amalgamated with Dunedin until much later. The town belt now forms a break between the city's inner and outer suburbs. The belt was originally a combination of native bush and scrubland, but is now largely replanted forest and open parkland. Many species of plant can be found in the belt, including tree fuchsia, lemonwood, lancewood, mānuka, and broadleaf, and the forested area is home to many species of birds, including some uncommon and endangered species such as the kererū, eastern rosella, bellbird, tomtit, tūī, rifleman, morepork, and shining cuckoo, and kōtare.

A long, narrow road, Queens Drive, winds along much of the length of the belt and provides easy access to it for Dunedinites. Queens Drive is linked to many of the city's main streets, including Stuart Street and High Street. Numerous walkways lead through the bush and parks, and the belt is a popular recreation area for Dunedinites.

The Town Belt includes many open areas and parks, including the Kensington Oval, Dunedin Southern Cemetery, Montecillo Ground, Unity Park, Mornington Ground, Jubilee Park, Belleknowes Golf Course, Robin Hood Park, Littlebourne Ground, Prospect Park, Woodhaugh Gardens, the North Ground, Dunedin Botanic Gardens, Dunedin Northern Cemetery, Logan Park, and the University Oval.

Notable buildings and structures in the belt include Moana Pool, Olveston, Otago Boys' High School, and the Beverly-Begg Observatory.

The green areas of the Town Belt flank the hills above central Dunedin.

== Management and use ==
=== Town Belt Reserve Management Plan (2025) ===
In August 2025, the Dunedin City Council adopted an updated Town Belt Reserve Management Plan, which guides the reserve’s long-term use and development. The plan recognises the Town Belt’s value for recreation, biodiversity, cultural heritage, and landscape amenity, and identifies actions to improve non-vehicular access and shared pathways through the reserve, including investigating adaptations to Queens Drive. At about 202 ha in size, the plan frames policies for protecting and enhancing both the native bush and the open spaces for community benefit.

=== Town Belt Active Travel Trial ===
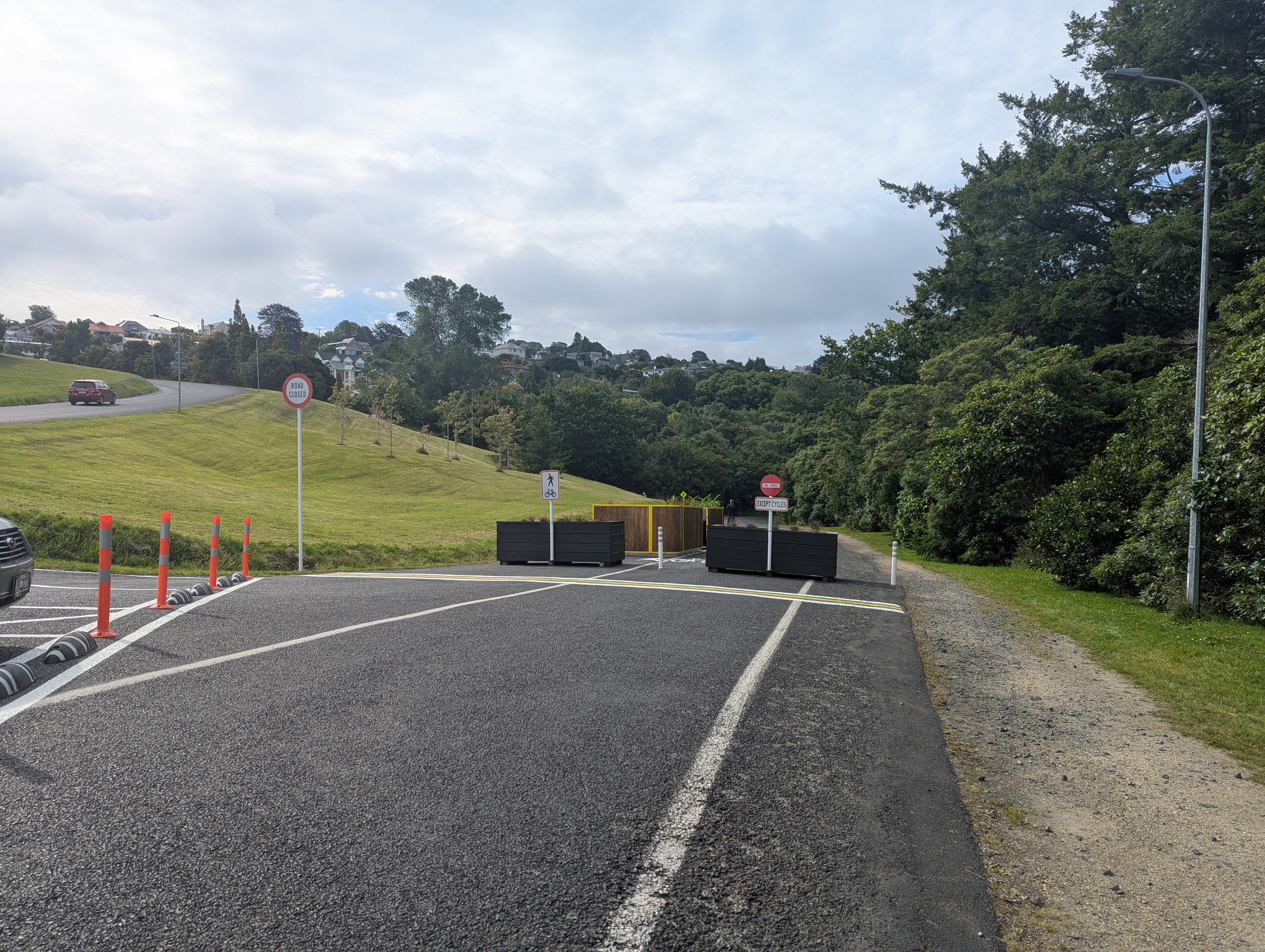
Road closure at the Preston Crescent.

On 11 December 2025, the Dunedin City Council voted 10–4 to proceed with the Town Belt Active Travel Trial, a temporary road-closure initiative intended to assess alternative recreational and transport uses of parts of the Town Belt.

The trial runs from 26 January to 19 April 2026 and involves the closure of Queens Drive between Braid Road and Preston Crescent, as well as a section of Braid Road between Queens Drive and Ross Street. Vehicle access for residents, emergency services, and essential purposes is maintained, with bollards and signage used to prevent through traffic.

The trial aims to encourage walking and cycling, improve transport safety, reduce illegal parking and dumping, and test the area’s suitability as a shared recreational space. It follows the direction set out in the Dunedin Town Belt Reserve Management Plan adopted in 2025, which identified Queens Drive as a suitable location for testing alternative uses within the reserve.

Before the council decision, reporting noted that proposals for a pedestrian and cycle route through the Town Belt were the most frequently discussed issue during public consultation, with a majority of submitters expressing support, while others raised concerns regarding access, design, and the loss of vehicle routes.

The trial attracted public debate following its implementation. Critics described elements of the project as unnecessary or poorly prioritised, arguing that vehicle access along Queens Drive is an important amenity and that council resources should focus on basic infrastructure maintenance. Supporters and councillors emphasised that the trial was temporary and intended to gather data and public feedback.

Concerns about potential restrictions on vehicle access in the Town Belt had also been raised during consultation on the updated Town Belt Management Plan, with some submitters arguing that the reserve should remain accessible to motorists as well as pedestrians and cyclists.

Following the conclusion of the trial, the council is expected to review usage data and community feedback before deciding whether to make the road closures permanent, modify the road’s function, or reinstate vehicle access.
