= Roslyn, Dunedin =

Suburb of Dunedin, New Zealand

Roslyn
- Suburb
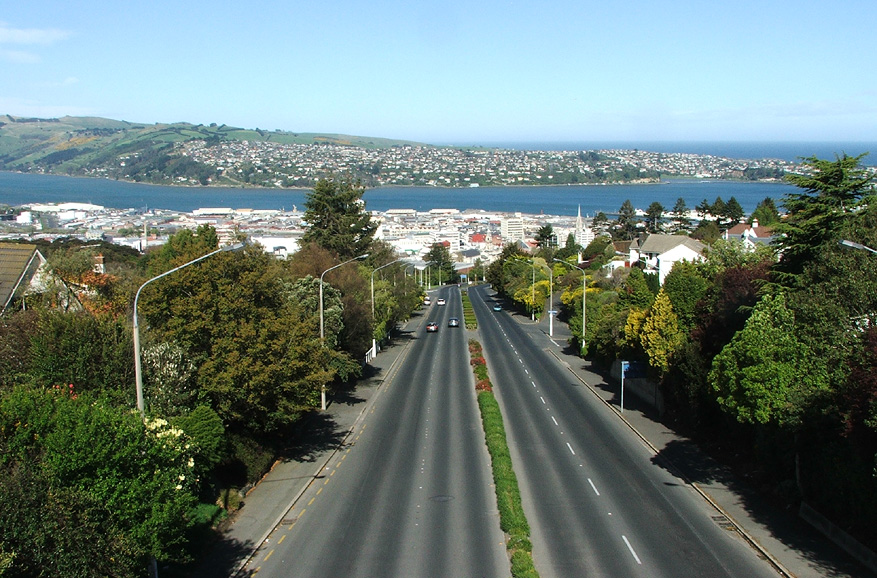
- Looking from the Roslyn Overbridge, toward Dunedin city centre
- Interactive map of Roslyn
- Coordinates: 45.8673°S 170.4899°E
- Country: New Zealand
- City: Dunedin
- Local authority: Dunedin City Council

Area
  - Land: 129 ha (320 acres)

Population (June 2025)
  - Total: 3,010
  - Density: 2,330/km^{2} (6,040/sq mi)

Wakari	Maori Hill	Dunedin North
Glenross	Roslyn
Bradford	Belleknowes	City Rise

Roslyn is a major residential and retail suburb of the New Zealand city of Dunedin. It is located 150 metres (490 ft) above the city centre on the ridge which runs in a crescent around the central city's western edge. It is 2.5 kilometres (1.6 mi) to the northwest of the city centre, immediately above the Town Belt.

Roslyn is connected to the city's CBD via Stuart Street and City Road. The former of these runs below Roslyn under the Roslyn Overbridge, and is linked to the suburb via a complex interchange To the west of Roslyn, Stuart Street passes the suburbs of Kaikorai and Wakari before becoming Taieri Road, which eventually traverses Three Mile Hill to reach the Taieri Plains. City Road travels through Belleknowes before linking with Rattray Street and descending the City Rise, reaching the central city at The Exchange. Roslyn is also connected to the suburbs of Mornington to the southwest and Maori Hill to the northeast by way of Highgate, Roslyn's main road.

Roslyn is predominantly residential, though it does contain one of the city's peripheral retail areas at and around Roslyn Village on Highgate just to the southwest of the overbridge. One of the city's most notable single-sex girls' schools, Columba College, is located close to the suburb's border with Maori Hill.

The suburb and its neighbour, Wakari, between them lend their names to one of Dunedin's most prominent football teams, Roslyn-Wakari. This team's home ground is actually at Ellis Park in Kaikorai, immediately to the northwest of Roslyn. Also in Kaikorai is the building of the former Roslyn Woollen Mills, a company through whose products the name of Roslyn was widely known nationwide.

== History ==
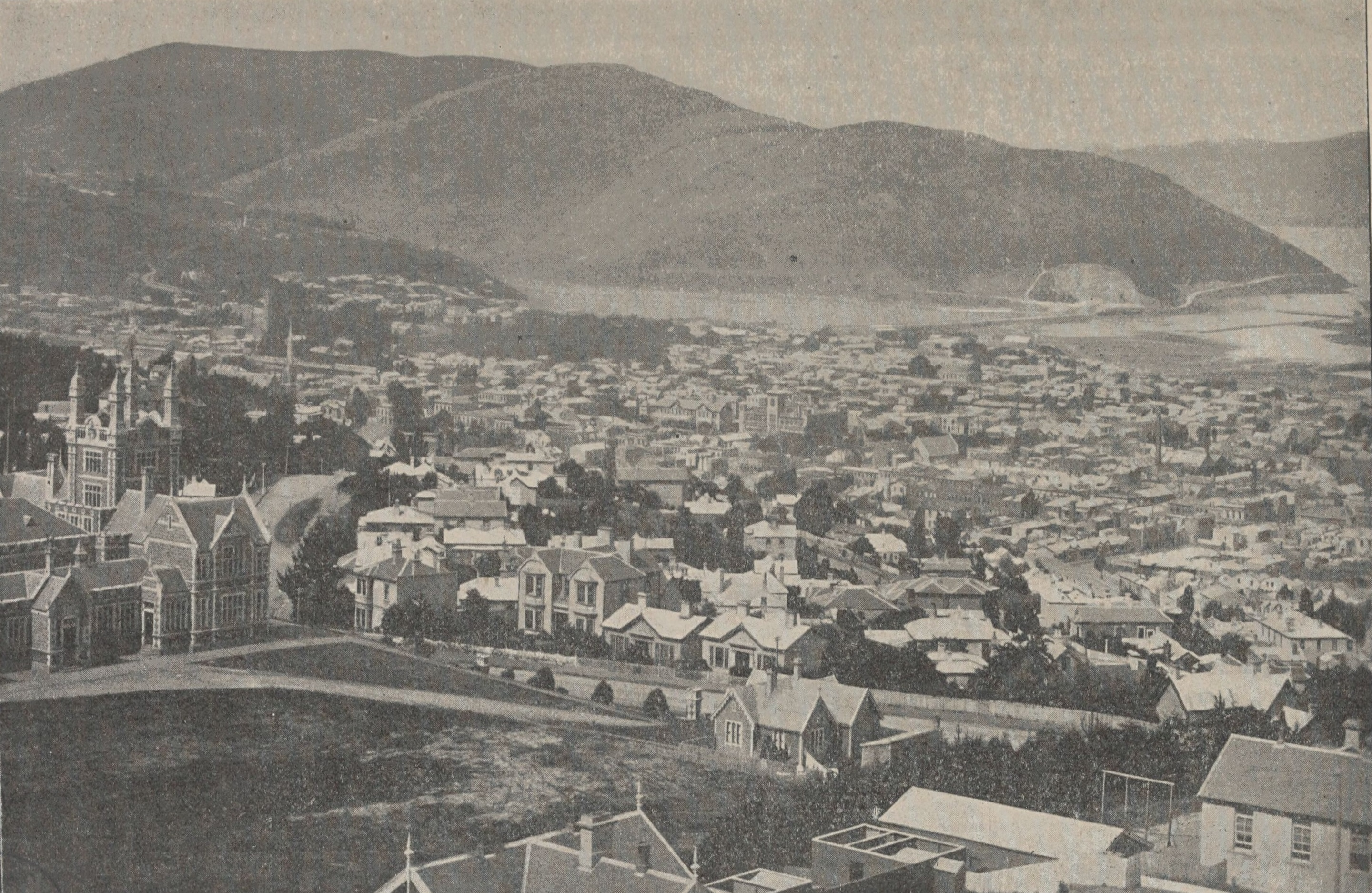
View over Roslyn (1903)

Roslyn was named after Roslin in Scotland. Many street names and some district names in Dunedin derive from like features in Edinburgh and its surrounds. Roslyn was reportedly named by a James Kilgour who subdivided his property there and gave it the name.

Roslyn's first house was what is now number eight Lundie Street. The house was prefabricated in Australia before being erected in Rosslyn Hill in 1858 for Mr Brown, for whom the street was originally named Brown Street.

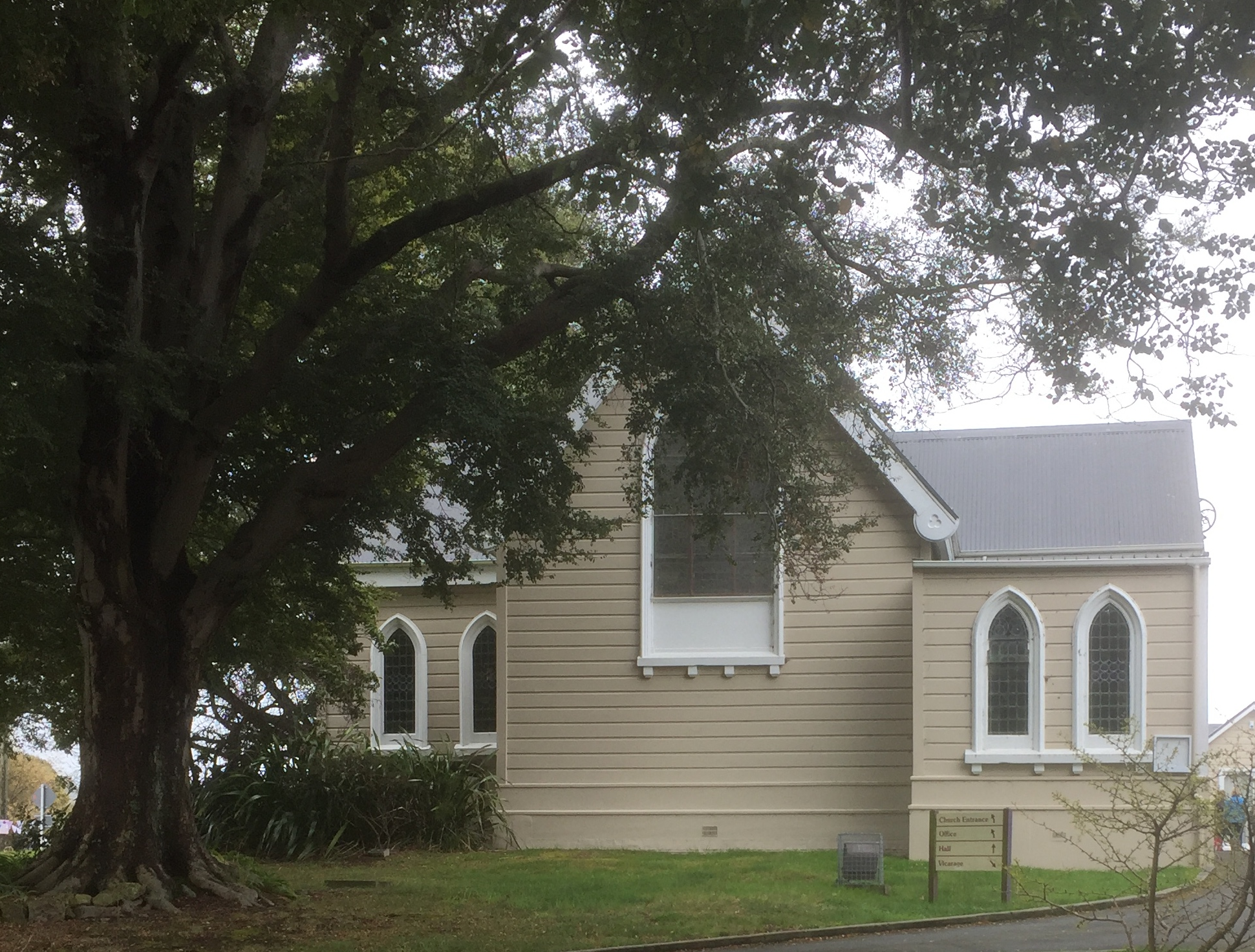
St John's Anglican Church, Roslyn, viewed from Highgate

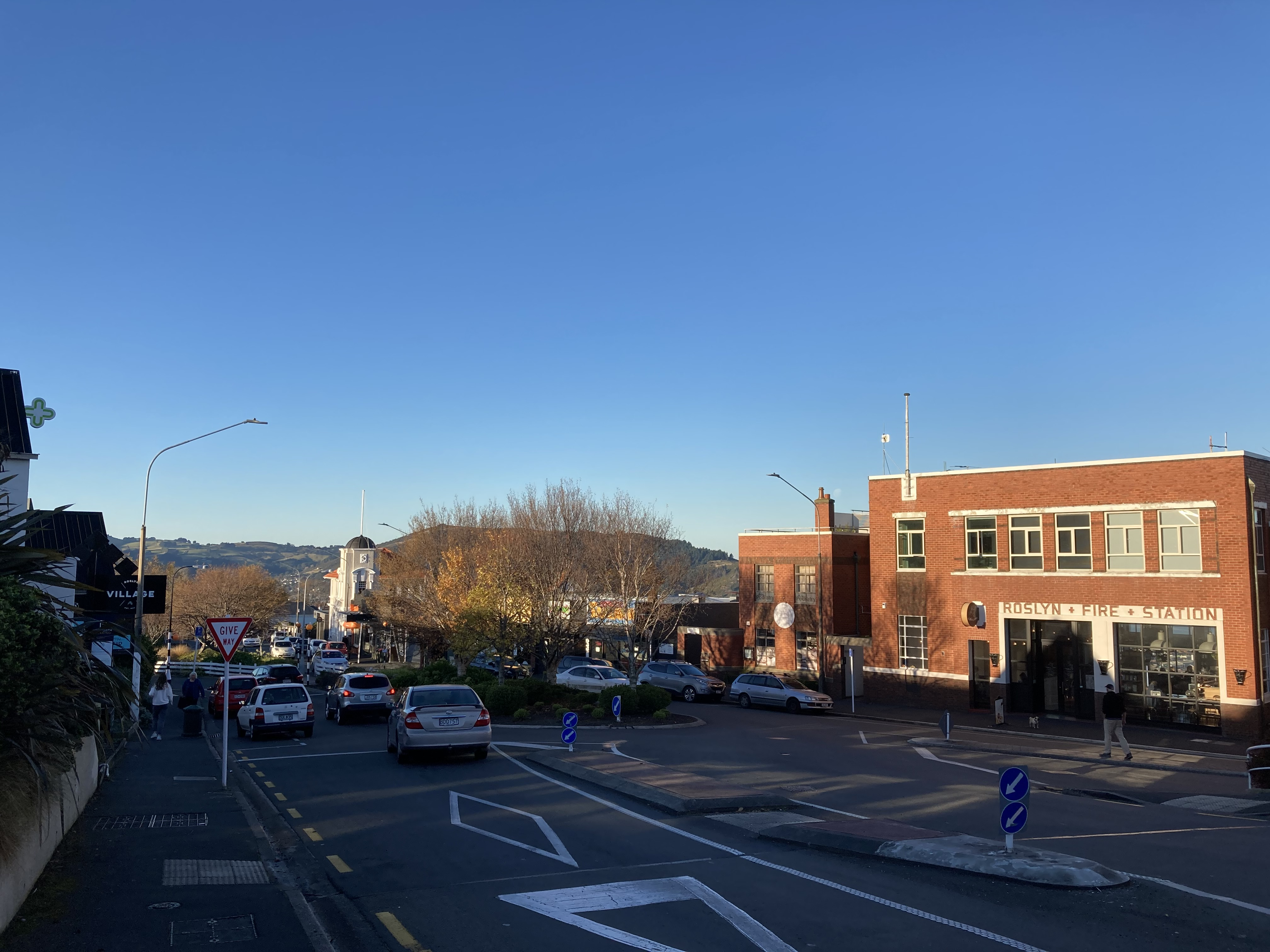
Roslyn village shopping area, with the old post office in the background. The Roslyn Fire Station is home to a cafe, spa and apartments.

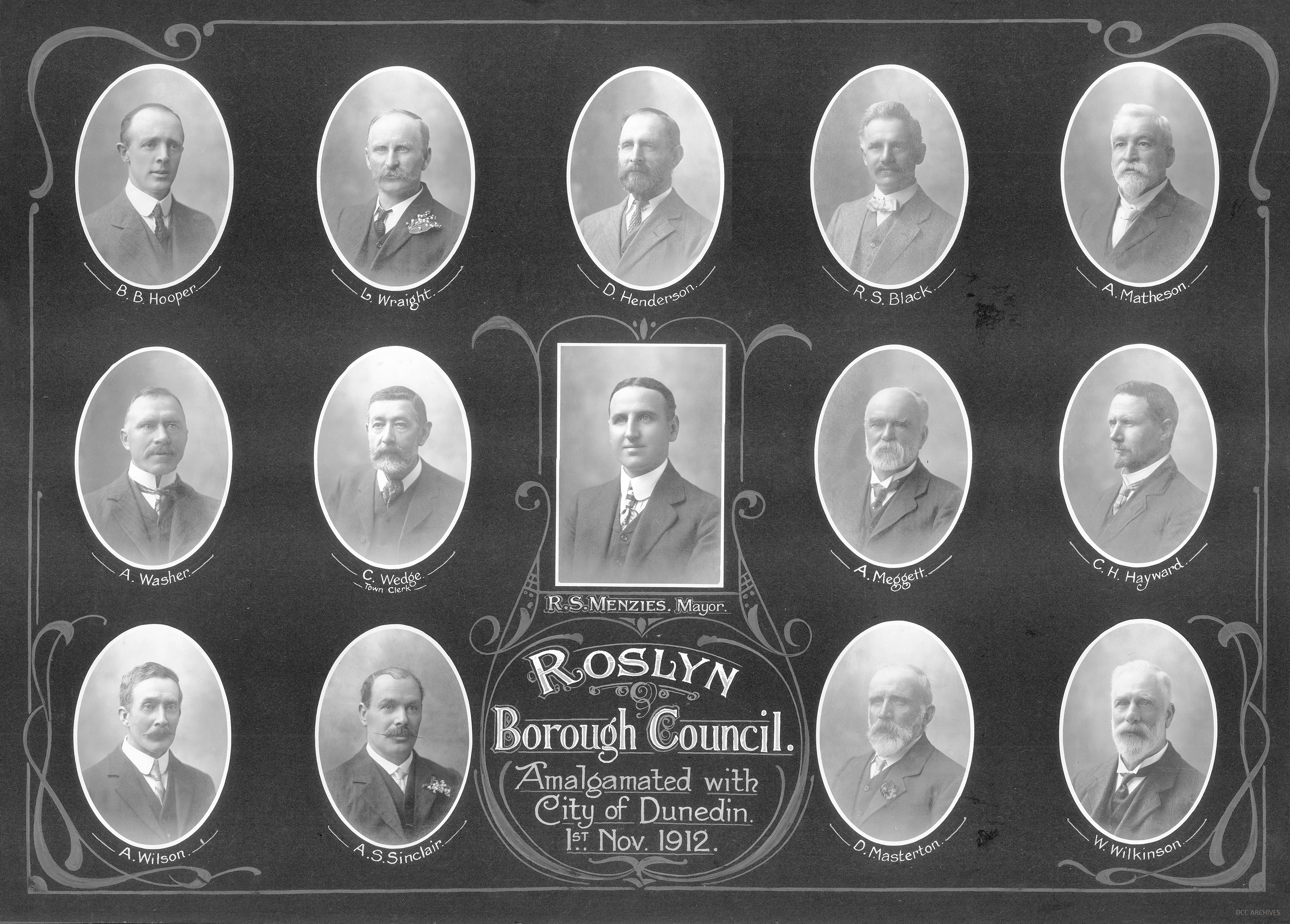
Roslyn Borough Council 1912

The suburb of Roslyn contains Kaikorai Primary School, currently accessed off Wright Street. The school was previously a bluestone building accessed through a pair of memorial arches on Tyne Street. The arches were removed in 1981 for safety reasons, although the gateway still remains. Wright Street was originally Linden Street, named for the large linden tree which still stands outside number 360 Highgate. Opposite the school is St John's Anglican Church, built in 1880.

Roslyn existed as a borough, separate from Dunedin, between 1877 and 1912, when it merged into Dunedin City. There were 14 mayors during the period of Roslyn Borough Council; the following is a complete list:

	Name	Term	Notes
1	James Kilgour	1877–1878	
2	Nathaniel Young Armstrong Wales	1878–1879	
3	Archibald Hilson Ross	1879–1880	
4	Alexander Campbell Begg	1880–1881	
5	Robert Chisholm	1881–1884	
6	Louis Kemnitz	1884–1885	
(4)	Alexander Campbell Begg	1885–1893	
7	Alexander Matheson	1893–1894	
(6)	Louis Kemnitz	1894–1895	
8	John Liddell	1895–1896	
(6)	Louis Kemnitz	1896–1897	
9	David Scott	1897–1898	
10	Robert Watson	1898–1899	
(7)	Alexander Matheson	1899–1901	
11	Thomas Mackenzie	1901–1905	
12	Alfred Washer	1905–1906	
(4)	Alexander Campbell Begg	1906–1907	
(7)	Alexander Matheson	1907–1909	
13	John Henry Francis Hamel	1909–1912	
14	Robert Sproull Hutton Menzies	1912	

The Roslyn scout hall, on School St, burned down on 14 January 2026, occasioning an emergency smoke alert to local residents. The hall, which was 100 years old and had previously been the Roslyn Baptist Church, was demolished the next day. The scout group had been planning to remove the hall from the site prior to the fire.

== Littlebourne ==
The locality of Littlebourne, considered by some a separate suburb, lies in the Town Belt on the slopes immediately below and to the southeast of Roslyn. Notable features of Littlebourne include Otago Boys' High School and its sportsground, the Littlebourne Ground, and the city's main swimming pool, Moana Pool.

On Melrose Street, the distinctive Claremont House, formerly called Melrose, was built by the prominent local Glendining family.

Roberts Park, a sports ground above Moana Pool, was originally the site of Littlebourne House. The house was built by mayor John Roberts, and had 30 rooms, stables and a porter's lodge, set in more than 4 acres of grounds. After Roberts death in 1934, the house and grounds were gifted to the city for the use of the Governor-General. However the Government refused to furnish the property, and although it was used by the military during the Second World War, and later as a student hostel, it was pulled down in 1947.

== Cable cars ==
Roslyn was in earlier times served by two separate cable car lines (see Dunedin cable tramway system).

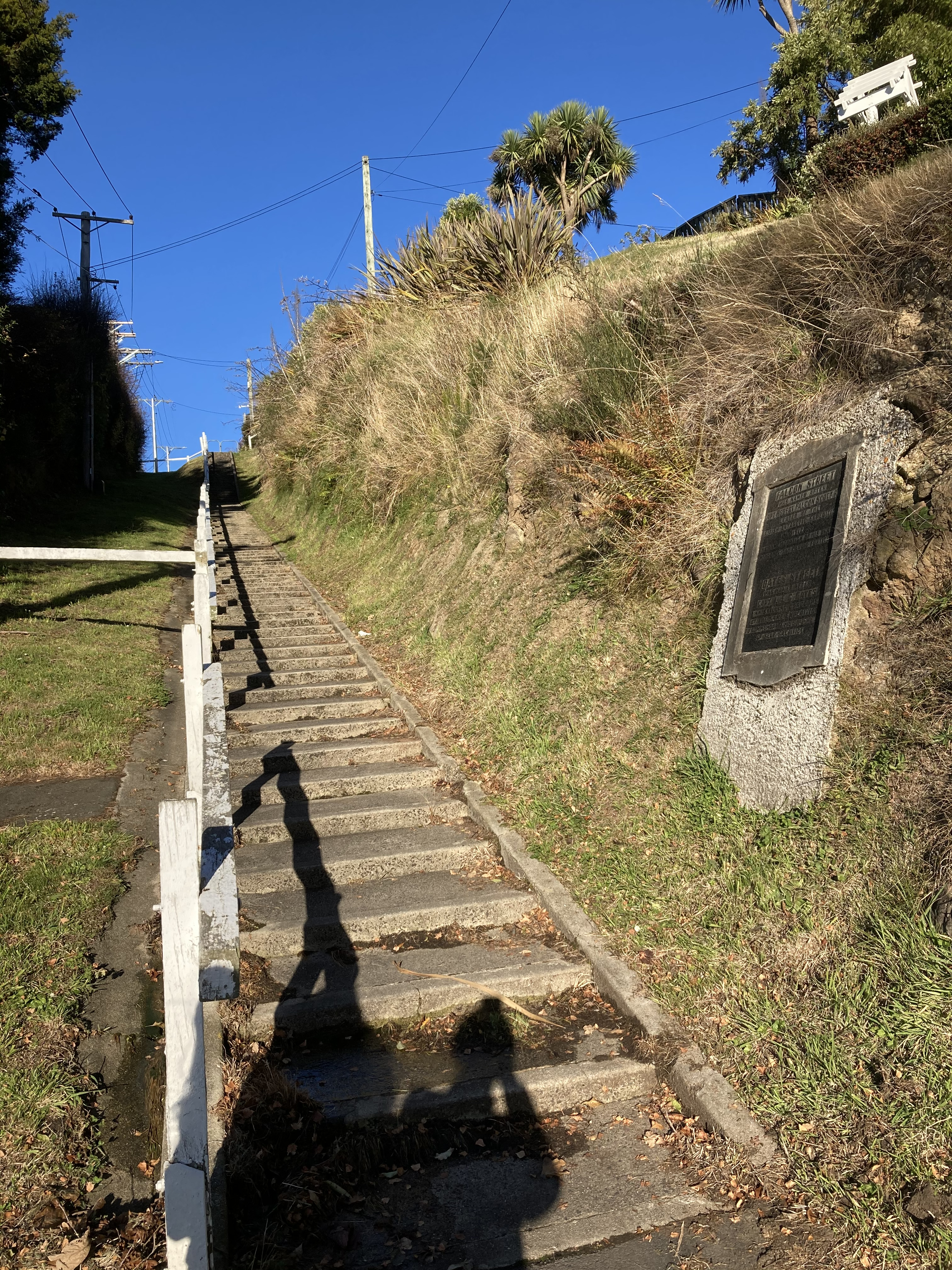
The Falcon Street steps where the cable car ran. The plaque commemorates the renaming of James Street into Falcon Street after Robert Falcon Scott, and the naming of Oates Street after Lawrence Oates.

One came up Stuart Street from The Octagon, turned half right at York Place into what was then called Albert Street, continued on past the end of that street through a short section of the Town Belt, past Otago Boys' High School, across the bottom of Littlebourne Crescent, and up to Highgate at School Street, then dropped down to Kaikorai just before Nairn Street, where a turntable in the road turned cars through ninety degrees and sent them south-west into their shed if it was time to go there. The route was eventually turned into a four-lane highway, cutting Littlebourne Crescent off from Littlebourne Road, going under the new bridge and undergoing considerable widening on the Kaikorai side, restricting access to Ann Street and Oates Street.

The other line went up Rattray Street then cut through the Town Belt (where the cutting is still generally visible) past the Beverly-Begg Observatory to climb the full length of Ross Street and part of Belgrave Crescent, then descend through a cutting to the valley near Frasers Road. Until 1900 the Roslyn cable car stopped at the bottom of Ross Street, after which it was extended to Kaikorai through a route using Falcon Street (then called James Street, until 1912). On 1 June 1942 a 13-year-old girl, June Cameron, was injured falling from a runaway tram at the top of James Street. Cameron later died of her injuries, and this section of line was condemned as unsafe by the Public Works Department, and a second route through to Kaikorai was then developed. The Roslyn cable car operated from 1906 to 1951.

The western section beyond the cutting was too steep for a road link, so, when the cable cars ceased, the portion near Belgrave Crescent was redeveloped as a short street serving several houses while retaining the pedestrian walkway through to Delta Street. Trolleybuses replaced the service as far as Belgrave Crescent, using the existing City Road instead of the straight steep cutting through the Town Belt.

== Demographics ==
Roslyn covers 1.29 km^{2} (0.50 sq mi) and had an estimated population of 3,010 as of June 2025, with a population density of 2,333 people per km^{2}.

Historical population
Year	Pop.	±% p.a.
2006	2,940	—
2013	3,060	+0.57%
2018	3,048	−0.08%

Roslyn had a population of 3,048 at the 2018 New Zealand census, a decrease of 12 people (−0.4%) since the 2013 census, and an increase of 108 people (3.7%) since the 2006 census. There were 1,158 households, comprising 1,407 males and 1,641 females, giving a sex ratio of 0.86 males per female. The median age was 43.1 years (compared with 37.4 years nationally), with 456 people (15.0%) aged under 15 years, 633 (20.8%) aged 15 to 29, 1,308 (42.9%) aged 30 to 64, and 651 (21.4%) aged 65 or older.

Ethnicities were 87.5% European/Pākehā, 4.2% Māori, 1.7% Pasifika, 10.4% Asian, and 1.7% other ethnicities. People may identify with more than one ethnicity.

The percentage of people born overseas was 27.5, compared with 27.1% nationally.

Although some people chose not to answer the census's question about religious affiliation, 50.8% had no religion, 38.3% were Christian, 1.3% were Hindu, 0.8% were Muslim, 0.9% were Buddhist and 2.2% had other religions.

Of those at least 15 years old, 1,191 (45.9%) people had a bachelor's or higher degree, and 273 (10.5%) people had no formal qualifications. The median income was $32,900, compared with $31,800 nationally. 597 people (23.0%) earned over $70,000 compared to 17.2% nationally. The employment status of those at least 15 was that 1,161 (44.8%) people were employed full-time, 420 (16.2%) were part-time, and 81 (3.1%) were unemployed.

== Education ==
Kaikorai Primary School is a state contributing primary school for Year 1 to 6 students, with a roll of 292 students. The school opened in 1884, replacing Old Linden School which had opened on the same site in 1869.

Columba College is a state-integrated coed/girls composite school for Year 1 to 13 students, with a roll of 605 students. It opened in 1915 as a private Presbyterian school with a co-educational primary school and girls' secondary college. and integrated into the state system in 1994.

Rolls are as of March 2026.
