= George V Bridge =

George V Bridge or King George V Bridge may refer to a number of different bridges named after the British king:

- Keadby Bridge across the River Trent in Lincolnshire, England
- George V Bridge, Glasgow, across the River Cylde in the centre of Glasgow, Scotland
- George V Bridge, Orléans, across the Loire in Orléans
