= George Street, Dunedin =

Street in New Zealand

Coordinates: 45.86403°S 170.50928°E

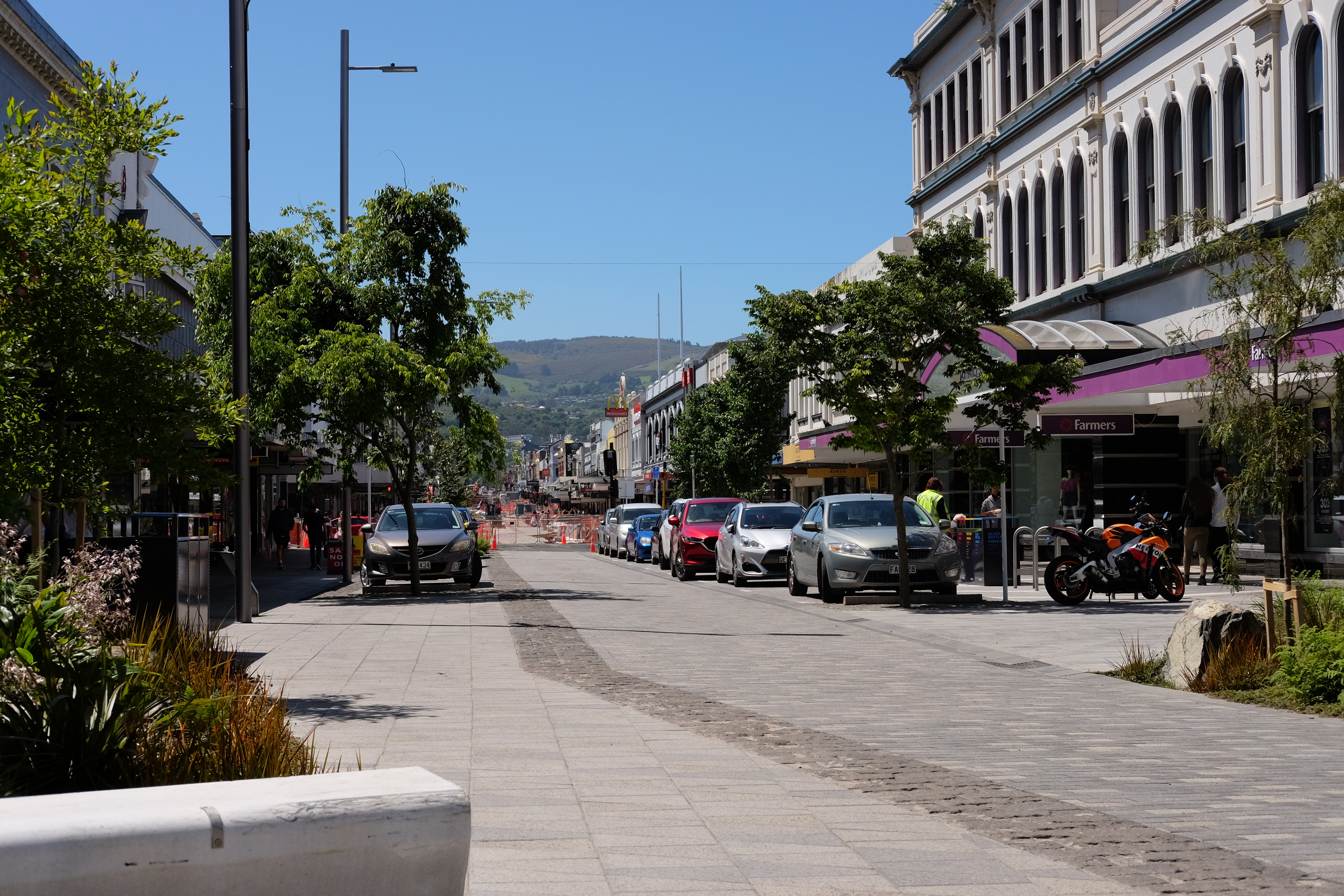
Dunedin's pedestrianised George Street, November 2023

Central Dunedin. George Street (1) and Princes Street (4) are marked in red

George Street is the main street of Dunedin, the second largest city in the South Island of New Zealand. It runs for two and a half kilometres north-northeast from The Octagon in the city centre to the foot of Pine Hill. It is straight and undulates gently as it skirts the edge of the hills to its northwest. South of The Octagon, Princes Street continues the line of George Street south-southwest for two kilometres.

== Early history ==
In the early years of Dunedin's settlement, much of the city's growth was on two areas of reasonably flat land close to the harbour, separated by the large Bell Hill and an area of low swampy land. The northern of these two flat areas surrounded the floodplain of the Water of Leith, a small river that runs through Dunedin. As the city grew the swamp was drained to become the new city centre, and the hill was lowered by excavation to allow access between the two areas of settlement. A street grid was set up with the main road split in two by the city centre (now The Octagon) - Princes Street to the south and George Street to the north. Both these names, along with many of the city's other street names, reflect those in Edinburgh, Scotland.

In the settlement's early days, Bell Hill proved a major obstacle to travel south of the city centre, and major excavation work was carried out to provide access to the south. A cutting was made in the hill in 1858, and during the 1860s the hill was lowered by some 14 metres (46 ft), much of the rubble forming the start of the Southern Endowment, a large area of land reclaimed from the Otago Harbour to the southeast of the city centre. Once the cut was completed, Princes Street quickly became the city's central business district, especially the area between the original docks (now the Exchange area) and around the cutting. Increased development to the north of the Octagon saw a slow but inexorable drift of the city's business heart to George Street, a trend possibly accelerated by the growth of the city's tertiary education sector, especially the University of Otago. Much of the city's economic and retail heart now lies between the University and the Octagon in the first few blocks of George Street and in the streets which cross it (notably Hanover Street and St. Andrew Street), and the two roads which run parallel to either side of George Street (Filleul Street to the west, and Great King Street to the east).

=== Historic buildings ===
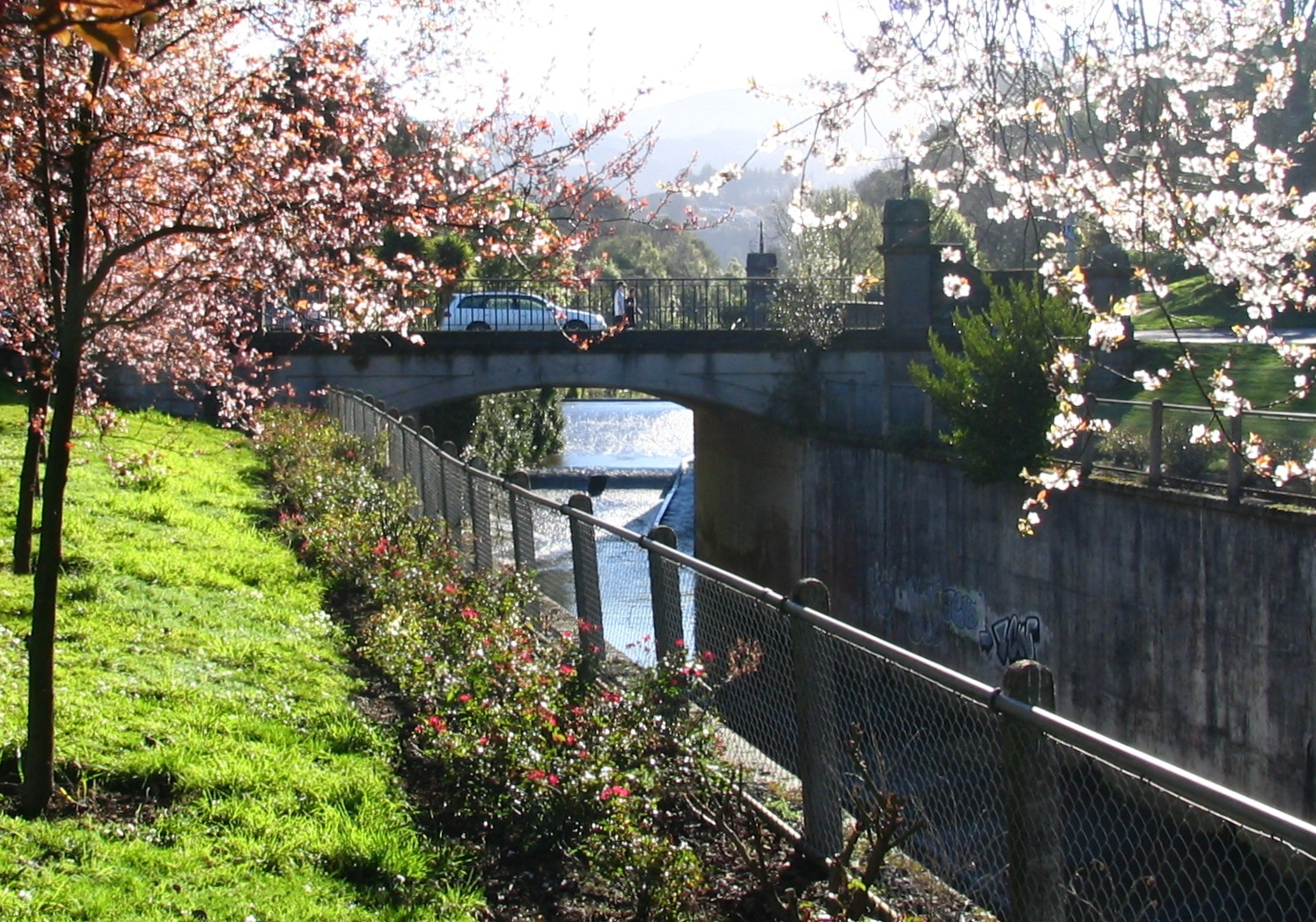
The historic George Street Bridge crosses the Leith at Woodhaugh Gardens.

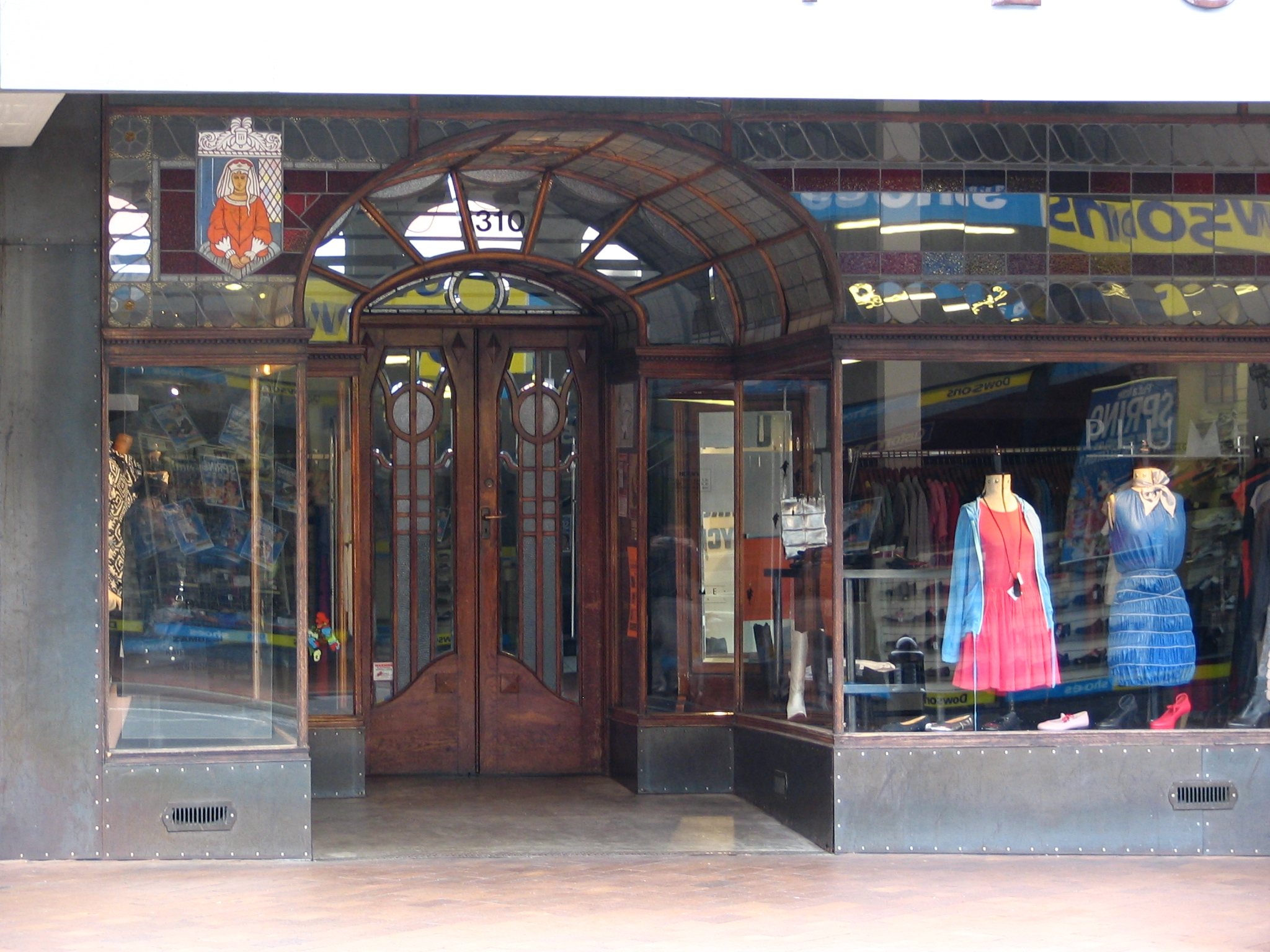
The ornate doorway of 310 George Street is a major feature of this historic building.

Until the early years of the 20th century, George Street stopped at the banks of the Leith at its northern end. A bridge, built in 1903, was one of few in the city to survive disastrous floods in March 1929. This bridge, simply known as George Street Bridge, is registered as a Category II historic structure by Heritage New Zealand.

Numerous other buildings on George Street also have Historic Places Trust protection, notably Knox Church (Category I). Other buildings with Category I or II protection include commercial buildings at 207, 310, 398, and 412a George Street; a hotel at 619 George Street; and residential properties at 504 (now used commercially), 521, 603 607, 613, 657, 1008, and 1014 George Street, as well as semi-detached houses at 637 and 641 George Street and a terraced block, 1046–1056 George Street. The former Bank of New Zealand building (now a real estate agent's premises), adjoining George Street close to Knox Church on the corner of London and Pitt Street, is also a Category II building.

== Modern George Street ==
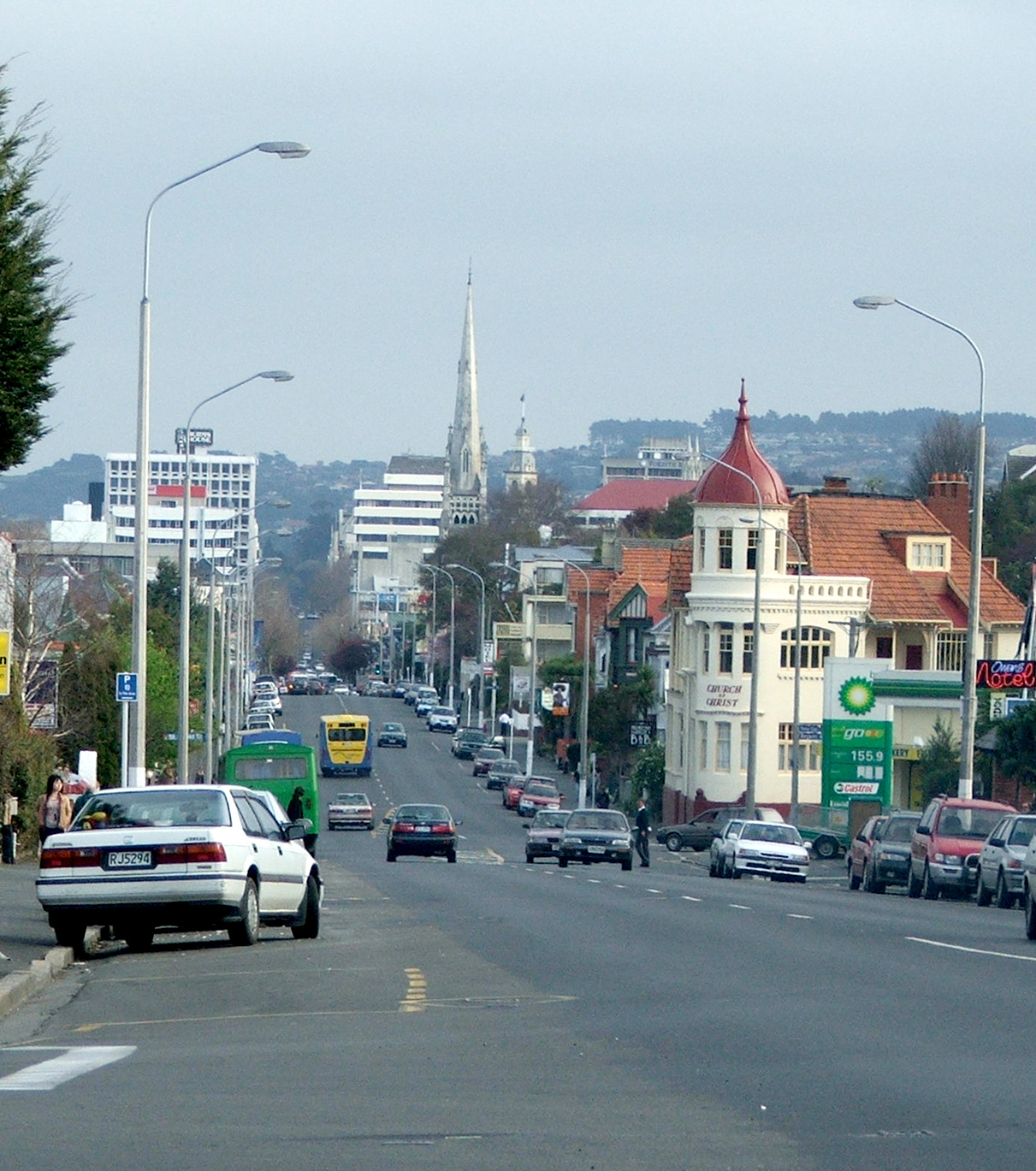
Looking south toward the city centre

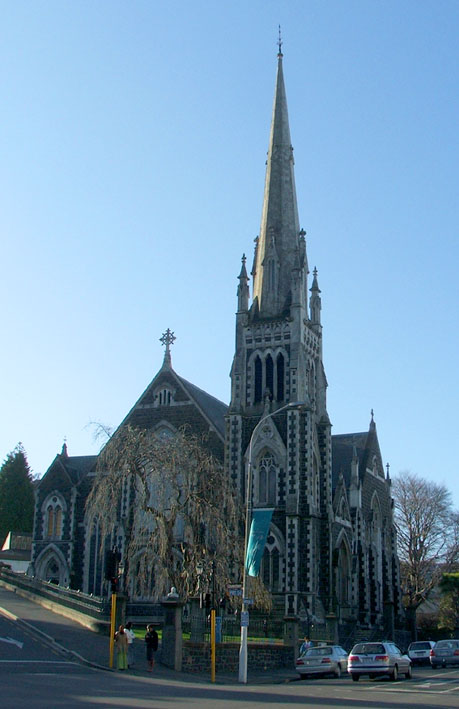
Knox Church

George Street is an interesting mix of different types of property. The southern kilometre is taken up by Dunedin's CBD, with the city's civic centre and library occupying much of the first block (the majority of blocks are 200 metres long). In early 2018, Barnes Dance crossings were introduced at either end of this block, at George Street's intersections with The Octagon and Moray Place.

Beyond this is a major shopping precinct, including Dunedin's largest shopping mall, the Meridian Mall. As the street approaches the northern end of its shopping area, many of the shops have a Southeast Asian flavour, in part due to the large proportion of Malaysian and Chinese students at the University of Otago, some 500 metres to the east.

At the northern end of the main shopping area the skyline is dominated by the spire of Knox Church, designed by R. A. Lawson. A block further north is the junction with Albany Street, a major route to the univerity's main campus. At the junction sits the National Memorial for Conscientious Objectors, the Archibald Baxter Peace Garden. This memorial, unveiled in 2021, is set around a flight of steps which rises to the northwest of the junction, and is topped by a sculpture by Shane Woolridge.

Beyond this point, the street is a mix of older residential houses and hotels. Many of Dunedin's more attractive inner city properties are at the north end of the street, quite a number of which have been divided up as student flats. Close to the street's northern end is the entrance to Woodhaugh Gardens, a major park, which lies to the west of George Street along the south-western bank of the Leith. Shortly after crossing the Leith at the historic George St Bridge, George Street ends, after passing under the Pine Hill Extension (part of State Highway 1). Beyond this bridge the street becomes Bank Street, a suburban arterial road, turning to the east before reaching a major junction at The Gardens.

=== Pedestrianisation ===
In 2019, the Dunedin City Council (DCC) approved a preliminary plan to turn a three-block section of George Street between Moray Place and Frederick Street into a southbound one-way street as part of planned NZ$60million upgrade of the Dunedin city centre. In response, George Street jeweller Brent Weatherall organised a petition opposing the proposed upgrade, which attracted several thousand signatures by December 2019. Weatherall argued that the proposed one-way traffic zone would be catastrophic for local businesses. Mayor Aaron Hawkins confirmed that a public consultation on the proposed upgrade would be held in early 2020.

In early May 2020, Weatherall and fellow retailer John Bezett submitted a 6,000-strong petition requesting that George Street remain two-way with ample parking. In addition, Weatherall submitted a submission on behalf of 40 businesses opposing the proposed one-way zone. Bezett also expressed concerns about the Council's lack of consultation with businesses. Opposition to the Council's proposed changes to George Street also came from Councillor Lee Vandervis and Property Council New Zealand Otago chapter executive member and Oakwood Properties director David Marsh, with the former claiming that Council staff were promoting an anti-car agenda.

In late September 2021, the DCC voted by a margin of nine to five to establish a one-way traffic zone in George Street between Frederick Street and Moray Place in order to increase space for pedestrians and cyclists. While councillors Carmen Houlahan and Lee Vandervis, local businesses and the Automobile Association Otago criticised the proposal on the grounds that it would lead to increased traffic congestion, this was supported by the Otago University Students' Association, CCS Disability Action Otago, and Generation Zero. In response to Mayor Hawkins' support for the traffic zone, Dunedin retailer Brent Weatherall barred Hawkins from his George St premises.

By early October 2022, paving was under way in the Farmers block of George Street. The Council also began planting nine tree species including field maple, Japanese elm, sourgum, tōtara, kōwhai, maidenhair, tulip tree, European beech, and mountain beech trees. In addition, quotes by Merekihereke Hape and Hone Tuwhare were inscribed into concrete pavers on the corner of George and St Andrew streets. Further inscriptions were added elsewhere in the project later during the work, with words by Dunedin writers ranging from poets Ruth Dallas and Peter Olds to local rock band The Clean.

By 11 November, the Farmers block of the development was completed with a small ceremony held celebrate the milestone. Former critic Weatherall, who had been elected the previous month as a Dunedin City councillor, praised the redevelopment as a "vast improvement on what was there before" but questioned the 10km speed limit. The Council also announced that redevelopment would begin in the Knox block of George Street between Frederick and Albany Streets, with completion due in January 2023. In response to a planned review of the George Street redevelopment by newly-elected Mayor Jules Radich, Disabled Persons Assembly coordinator Chris Ford urged the Council not to go ahead with a review, stating that redevelopment changes made it easier for wheelchair users to cross the street.

In early December 2022, Radich proposed a review at the next Council meeting to maintain two-way traffic along George Street. On 10 February, DCC staff warned that redesigning George Street to incorporate "two-way design" could delay further construction by four to eight months, potentially costing $1 million. The proposal was rejected.

According to the Otago Daily Times, the George Street redevelopment (including replacing pipes) was estimated to cost about NZ$40 million. Work to complete the project concluded in early 2024.

== See also ==
- George Street, Edinburgh
- Elizabeth Dreaver
