= Leith Valley =

Suburb of Dunedin, New Zealand

- Suburb
- Woodhaugh and the mouth of the Leith Valley, seen from Prospect Park immediately to the south. The Gardens Corner, at the mouth of North East Valley, is visible in the background, top right.
- Interactive map of Leith Valley
- Coordinates: 45.8451°S 170.5065°E
- Country: New Zealand
- City: Dunedin
- Local authority: Dunedin City Council

Area
  - Land: 212 ha (520 acres)

Population (June 2025)
  - Total: 1,390
  - Density: 656/km^{2} (1,700/sq mi)

		Waitati
	Leith Valley	Pine Hill
Helensburgh	Maori Hill	The Gardens

Leith Valley is a suburb, valley, and general area of the New Zealand city of Dunedin, located to the northwest of the city centre. To differentiate the name of the valley from that of the suburb, the former is usually referred to as the Leith Valley, the latter simply as Leith Valley.

== The valley itself ==
As its name suggests, it is the valley of the Water of Leith, a 14-kilometre (8.7 mi) long stream which flows from the slopes of Mount Cargill south through the northern suburbs of Dunedin. The valley starts close to a saddle, Pigeon Flat, between it and the valley of the Waitati River, which is crossed by the Dunedin Northern Motorway. The motorway follows the flank of Mount Cargill's spur Pine Hill, which forms the northern boundary of the valley. The southern boundary is formed by Maori Hill, the northernmost part of a long ridge which forms a crescent around central Dunedin, culminating at Lookout Point in the city's southwest.

The valley starts steeply in bush-clad countryside, before widening into a narrow flood plain occupied by the start of Dunedin's suburban area. The valley widens, and is hemmed in by steep slopes and occasional cliff faces before joining the northern end of the wide plain which is the location of Dunedin's CBD some 2 kilometres (1.2 mi) from the coast. The lower reaches of the valley are within a popular recreation area, Woodhaugh Gardens, which borders the northern end of the city's main street, George Street. At its mouth, the valley is some 400 metres (440 yd) in width.

Much of Dunedin's water supply comes from reservoirs in the upper reaches of the Leith Valley. These include Ross Creek Reservoir, the oldest reservoir still in active use in New Zealand, and Sullivans Dam. Numerous popular walking tracks traverse the bush-clad reserve land surrounding this reservoir.

== The suburbs ==
The term "Leith Valley" can be used to refer to the semi-rural settlement which lies in the upper reaches of the valley, or - more generally - for both this community and the two suburbs which lie in the lower valley, Glenleith and Woodhaugh.

=== Leith Valley ===
Leith Valley is as much a rural settlement as a suburb, though it does lie within the Dunedin city boundaries very close to the edge of the city's main urban area. It is connected by Leith Valley Road, which follows the course of the river, crossing the Dunedin Northern Motorway by bridge towards its northern end. From here it runs roughly parallel with both the river and motorway before connecting with the latter at the Leith Saddle. At its southern end, Leith Valley Road becomes Malvern Street, the main route through Glenleith.

=== Glenleith ===
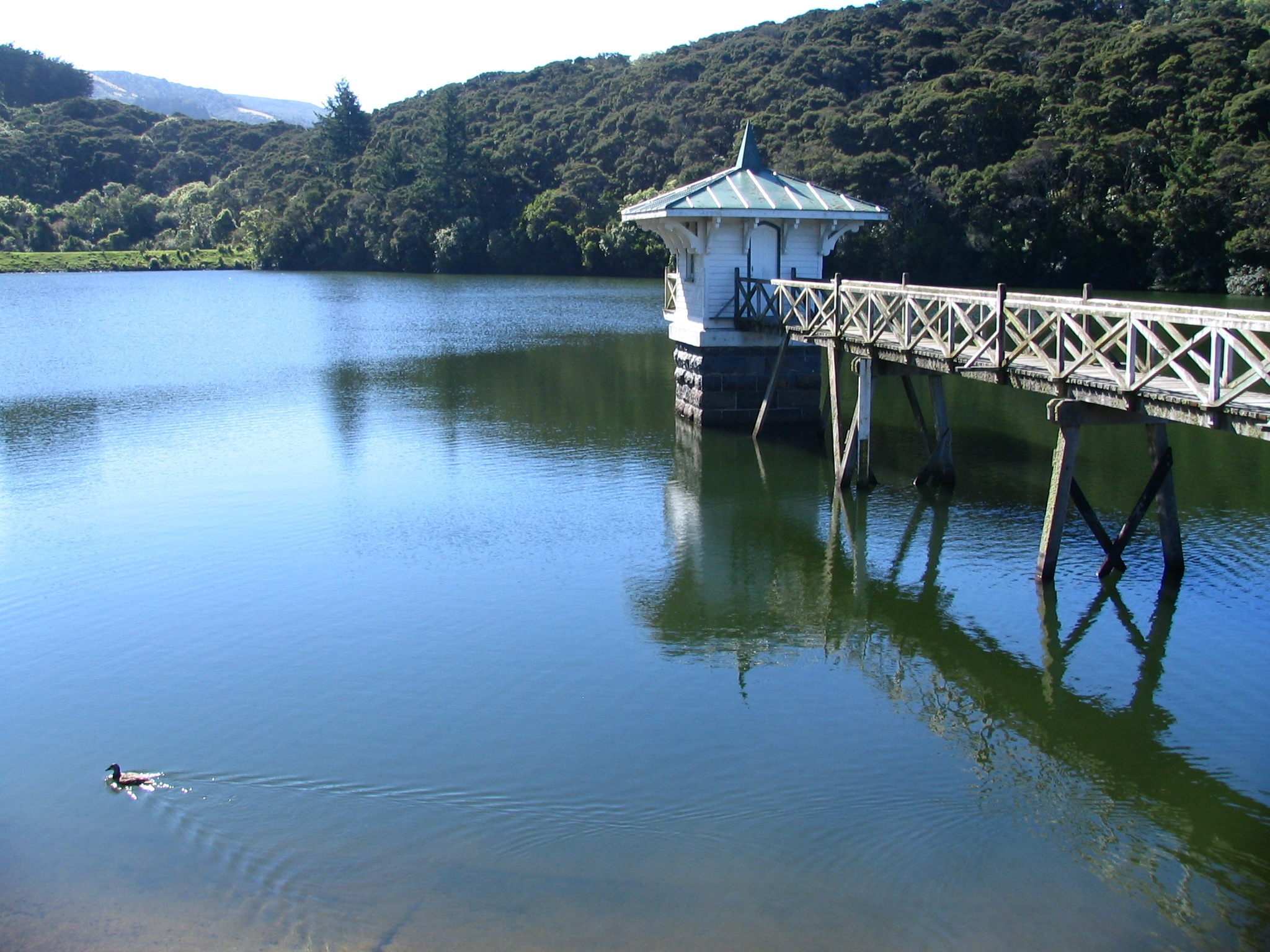
Ross Creek Reservoir.

The main suburban area within the Leith Valley is roughly split into two suburbs - Glenleith in the upper valley and Woodhaugh close to the valley's mouth. The two suburbs, and particularly Glenleith, were both heavily industrialised during the early years of Dunedin, with the power of the Leith being harnessed for sawmills from 1850 and for flour mills shortly thereafter. The first commercial paper mill in New Zealand was located in the valley, the last overgrown remains of which can still be seen close to a walking track.

The main road through Glenleith is Malvern Street, which runs from the Leith Valley Road in the upper valley to meet with Duke Street in Woodhaugh. Most of Glenleith's residences are located either on this street or around Fulton Road, a steep street which rises from Malvern Street, passing through forestry plantations before joining the end of Wakari Road near Helensburgh. A third main road, Rockside Road, runs from Malvern Street close to the boundary between Glenleith and Woodhaugh, winding uphill through the same plantations before becoming Tanner Road and joining with Wakari Road.

These plantations contain numerous walking tracks, and also contain the historically listed Ross Creek Reservoir, constructed in the late 1860s. The walking tracks circumnavigate the dam, as well as following the banks of the Ross Creek and School Creek, two small tributaries of the Leith.

Another major walking track, the Pineapple Track, has its northeastern end close to Fulton Road. This track traverses Flagstaff, a 650-metre (2,130 ft) hill which dominates the city's western skyline.

=== Woodhaugh ===
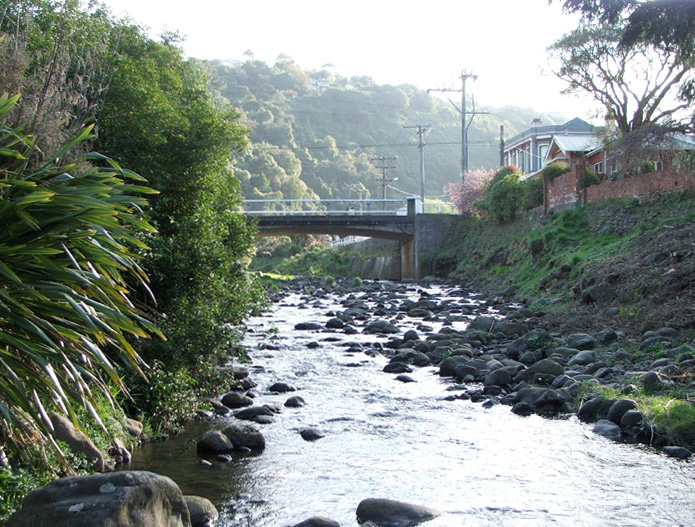
The Water of Leith at the northern end of Woodhaugh Gardens.

Woodhaugh is the suburban part of the Leith Valley which lies below the Rockside Road intersection. At its top, it houses numerous older stone buildings, many of them of some historical significance. Lower down, the suburb is dominated by Woodhaugh Gardens, a large area of parkland and trees that forms part of Dunedin's Town Belt. Once a quarry, this is one of the city's oldest parks, dating from 1895.

The area around the park is known as Woodhaugh and is a popular area for student accommodation, as it is only 15 minute walk to the university and the centre of the city. Most of Woodhaugh's residential area lies on Malvern Street, on Woodhaugh Street, a crescent in the upper part of the suburb, or on the small number of short streets close to the valley's mouth. At this point, Malvern Street becomes Duke Street, which intersects with the city's main commercial street, George Street at the valley's mouth. The suburb's only retail outlet, a dairy and grocery store, is located at the junction of Duke Street and George Street.

A series of walkways runs through Woodhaugh Gardens and along the banks of the Leith. One of these follows the course of the stream from the northern end of Woodhaugh Gardens to connect with the Ross Creek tracks, passing as it does a major weir (the Boulder Trap) which was put in to prevent a repeat of the major flooding of the Leith in the early 20th century. The walkway also passes the remains of the former Woodhaugh Quarry, which operated until 1949.

The sides of the Leith Valley are notably steep, especially in the area around the start of Rockside Road (also the location of the confluence of the Ross Creek and Leith). At this point, steep cliffs flank the valley, and nearby the Ross Creek passes through a narrow canyon. In the lower reaches of the valley, the valley's walls are still steep, though not vertical. The Dunedin Northern Motorway skirts the northern edge as it passes by the suburb of Dalmore, and along the southern edge of the valley, a walking track rises sharply, connecting Woodhaugh with Prospect Park, New Zealand. This track, the Bullock track, was originally part of a trail used by farmers taking cattle from the farms of North East Valley to abattoirs in Burnside, Otago.

== Demographics ==
The statistical area of Glenleith covers 2.12 km^{2} (0.82 sq mi) and had an estimated population of 1,390 as of June 2025, with a population density of 656 people per km^{2}.

Historical population
Year	Pop.	±% p.a.
2006	1,152	—
2013	1,113	−0.49%
2018	1,239	+2.17%

Glenleith had a population of 1,239 at the 2018 New Zealand census, an increase of 126 people (11.3%) since the 2013 census, and an increase of 87 people (7.6%) since the 2006 census. There were 450 households, comprising 630 males and 609 females, giving a sex ratio of 1.03 males per female. The median age was 36.6 years (compared with 37.4 years nationally), with 219 people (17.7%) aged under 15 years, 312 (25.2%) aged 15 to 29, 522 (42.1%) aged 30 to 64, and 186 (15.0%) aged 65 or older.

Ethnicities were 85.5% European/Pākehā, 9.2% Māori, 4.1% Pasifika, 8.7% Asian, and 3.6% other ethnicities. People may identify with more than one ethnicity.

The percentage of people born overseas was 24.5, compared with 27.1% nationally.

Although some people chose not to answer the census's question about religious affiliation, 52.8% had no religion, 34.6% were Christian, 0.7% had Māori religious beliefs, 0.5% were Hindu, 1.0% were Muslim, 1.0% were Buddhist and 3.4% had other religions.

Of those at least 15 years old, 360 (35.3%) people had a bachelor's or higher degree, and 99 (9.7%) people had no formal qualifications. The median income was $28,800, compared with $31,800 nationally. 180 people (17.6%) earned over $70,000 compared to 17.2% nationally. The employment status of those at least 15 was that 450 (44.1%) people were employed full-time, 177 (17.4%) were part-time, and 57 (5.6%) were unemployed.

== Notable features ==
Notable buildings in the Leith Valley include the Ross Creek Reservoir pumphouse, the historically significant 'Bishop's See House' at number 1 Malvern, also known as Hawthornden, and a former public house on the corner of Malvern Street and Woodhaugh Street, close to the bridge carrying Malvern Street over the Leith. This building operated as a public house between 1888 and 1892.

Woodhaugh Gardens is home to the Leith Valley Bowling Club, one of the city's main lawn bowls clubs.

A notable natural feature of the valley is the glow worm area off Leith Valley Road, accessible by the Nichols Falls walking track, a 40-minute walk.
