= New Zealand and South Seas Exhibition (disambiguation) =

New Zealand and South Seas Exhibitions may refer to:

- New Zealand and South Seas Exhibition (1889–1890), Dunedin
- New Zealand and South Seas International Exhibition (1925–1926), Dunedin

== See also ==
- New Zealand Exhibition (1865), Dunedin
- New Zealand Industrial Exhibition (1885), Wellington
- International Exhibition (1906), Christchurch
- New Zealand Centennial Exhibition (1939–1940), Wellington
