= History of the Dunedin urban area =

Dunedin
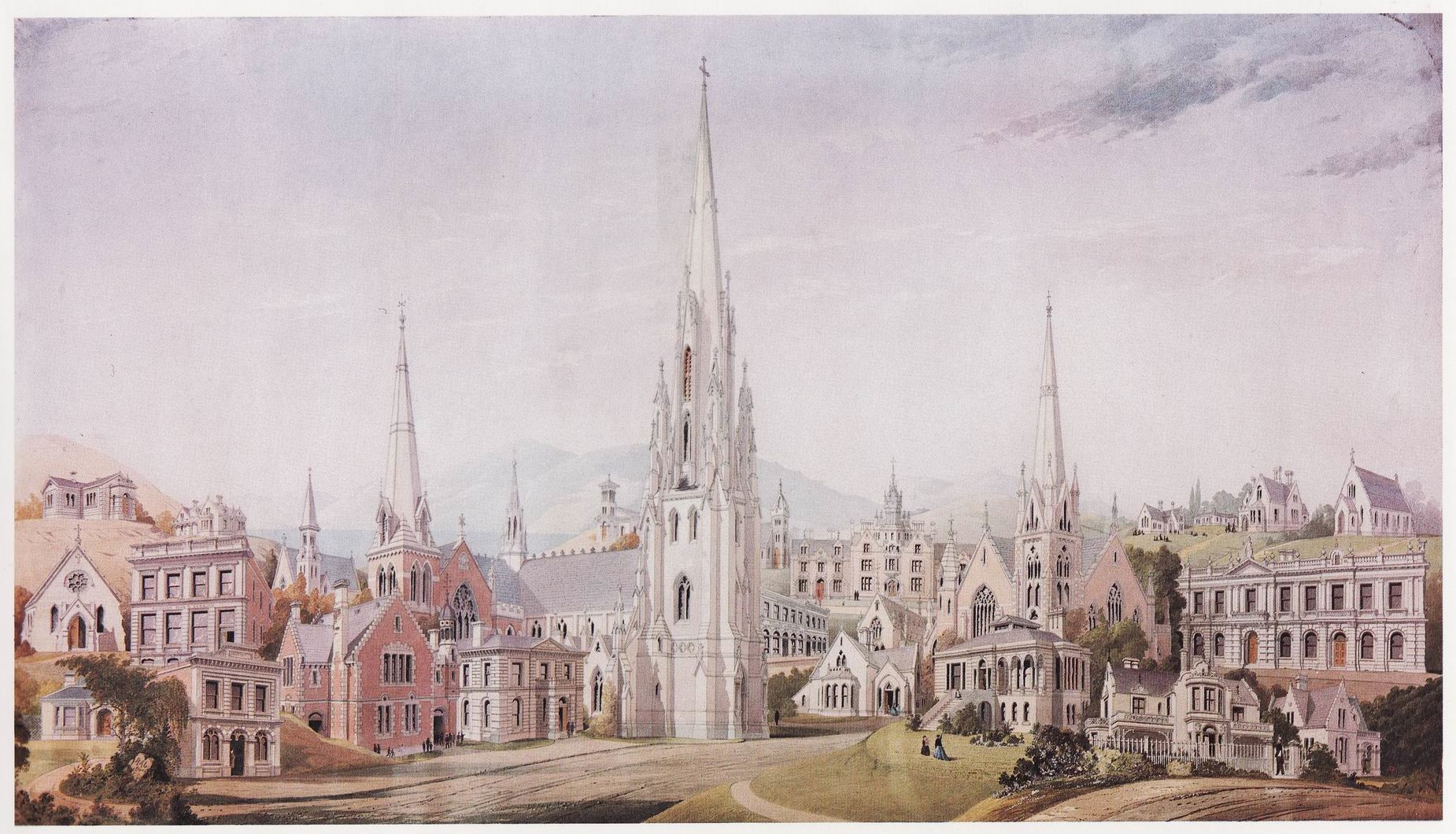
- George O'Brien aspirational drawing of Dunedin from the 1860s. First Church had not yet been built and many other depicted buildings never were.

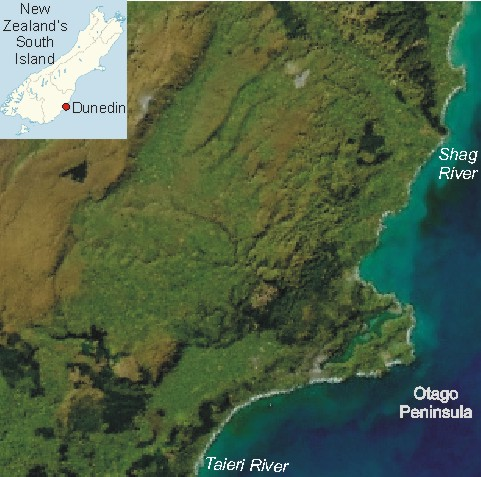

History
- Founder: William Cargill
- Built: 1848

The villages and then city of Dunedin that lay at the head of Otago Harbour never existed in isolation, but have always been a staging ground between inland Otago and the wider world. While Dunedin's current official city limits extend north to Waikouaiti, inland to Middlemarch and south to the Taieri River mouth, this articles focus is the history of the Dunedin urban area, only mentioning Mosgiel, the Otago Peninsula, Port Chalmers and inland Otago for context.

Archaeological evidence shows the first Māori occupation of the wider Dunedin area occurred within decades of their arrival in New Zealand (1280–1320). The population at this time was concentrated along the southern coast and they relied on seals and to a lesser extent moa for the bulk of their food. With reduced moa and seal numbers the population slumped. Elsewhere in New Zealand it grew again with the evolution of the horticulture based Classic culture, necessitating fortified villages (pā). However, this culture did not fully spread to the colder southern South Island. In this period there were two Māori settlements in what is now central Dunedin—Ōtepoti and Puketai.

Initially European contact was made by sealers in the 1790s and then whalers, both being focused in the lower harbour around Ōtākou. Both Ōtepoti and Puketai were abandoned by 1826 reflecting the massive loss of life from measles, population displacements from the Musket Wars and the new economic opportunities provided by Europeans.

In 1848 the Free Church of Scotland organised two ships to sail to the head of the Otago Harbour and found the colony of Dunedin. Soon after the discovery of gold inland from Dunedin in 1861 led to the new city becoming the New Zealand's main industrial and commercial centre. The University of Otago, the oldest university in New Zealand, was founded in Dunedin in 1869 also as a result of the Gold Rush. The successful export of frozen meat in the 1880s provided an extra impetus to Dunedin's importance and growth. During the 20th century, influence and activity moved away from Dunedin to the North Island. Dunedin then re-branded itself based on its culture, history and proximity to the wildlife of the Otago Peninsula.

== The upper harbour (1300–1848) ==
Inevitably the upper harbour was used by Māori for nearly 500 years before Europeans arrived but very little direct evidence remains. The current location of Dunedin's central city sits on either side of a ridge of land (Nga-Moana-e-rua) between the Toitu Stream and Water of Leith. The estuaries of both these rivers would have been used as landing sites for waka (boats) during seasonal migrations between the Otago Peninsula and inland Otago. There would have been periods of time when the movements of the dunes of St Kilda Beach allowed the harbour to almost break through to the sea, however, there is no record of it doing so during this time. It has been speculated that the silting up of this harbour entrance lead to the abandonment (late 1700s) of the village of Ōtepoti (central Dunedin) and its associated Pā site above Andersons Bay.

For the first 150 years after settlement the population of all New Zealand remained extremely low (~2000 people) and the southern South Island with its high seal population was a major hub of activity. However, from 1500 onward, as kumara could not be grown at Dunedin's latitude the area became depopulated in comparison with the North Island. At this time the local Māori moved with the seasons more than those further north. A complex web was developed of what tribe or family group had rights and responsibilities for what resources across Otago at different times. Villages were made up of wharerau (semi permanent houses) which could be left out of season and easy repaired when the group returned.

Māori tradition speaks of Rākaihautū excavating Kaikorai Valley in ancient time, of Kahui Tipua and Te Rapuwai, ancient peoples of shadowy memory, and then Waitaha, followed by Kāti Mamoe, the latter arriving late in the 16th century, and then Kāi Tahu from about the middle of the 17th century. These migrations, incidentally attended by bloodshed, did not represent a replacement of earlier groups. The dominant group of people changed, but their ancestral lineage (whakapapa ) was still connected to previous groups. Personalities from this time and later, such as Taoka and Te Wera, Tarewai and Te Rakiihia are identified with events at Huriawa, Mapoutahi, Pukekura and Otepoti and have descendants known in the historical period. Te Rakiihia died and was buried somewhere in what is now central Dunedin about 1785.

=== First contacts between Māori and Europeans (early 1800s) ===
Captain James Cook sailed off the Otago Peninsula between February 25 and March 5, 1770 and named Cape Saunders on the Otago Peninsula and Saddle Hill. He charted the area and reported penguins and seals in the vicinity which led sealers to visit, their first recorded landings being late in the first decade of the 19th century. A feud between sealers and Māori, sparked by an incident on a ship in Otago Harbour in 1810, continued until 1823. With peace re-established Otago Harbour went from being a secret sealers' haven to an international whaling port. The sealer John Boultbee recorded in the 1820s that the 'Kaika Otargo' (settlements around and near Otago Harbour) were the oldest and largest in the south.

In a relatively short period of time the economy shifted from a communal economy where the main unit was the tribe or extended family to a capitalist economy where the main unit was the individual (almost always male) or corporation. In the early 1800s the subsistence and barter economy of the Māori was altered with the quick adoption of the pound as a means of exchange. The Europeans were reliant on the Māori for food right up until the late 1840s which also allowed for a specialised economy. This along with the introduction of the potato and pigs (possibly from Captain Cooks release in the 1770s) allowed Māori from the Otago Peninsula to no longer need seasonal migrations to follow food sources. Therefore, directly or indirectly sealing and whaling was the primary employer in the Otago Harbour form the earliest nineteenth century until the founding of Dunedin. In the mid 1830s the Māori population was struck by introduced illnesses, partially measles. In the early 1840s early sheep farmers from the Otago Peninsula grazed their herds in the area that was to become central Dunedin.

== The village of Dunedin (1848) ==
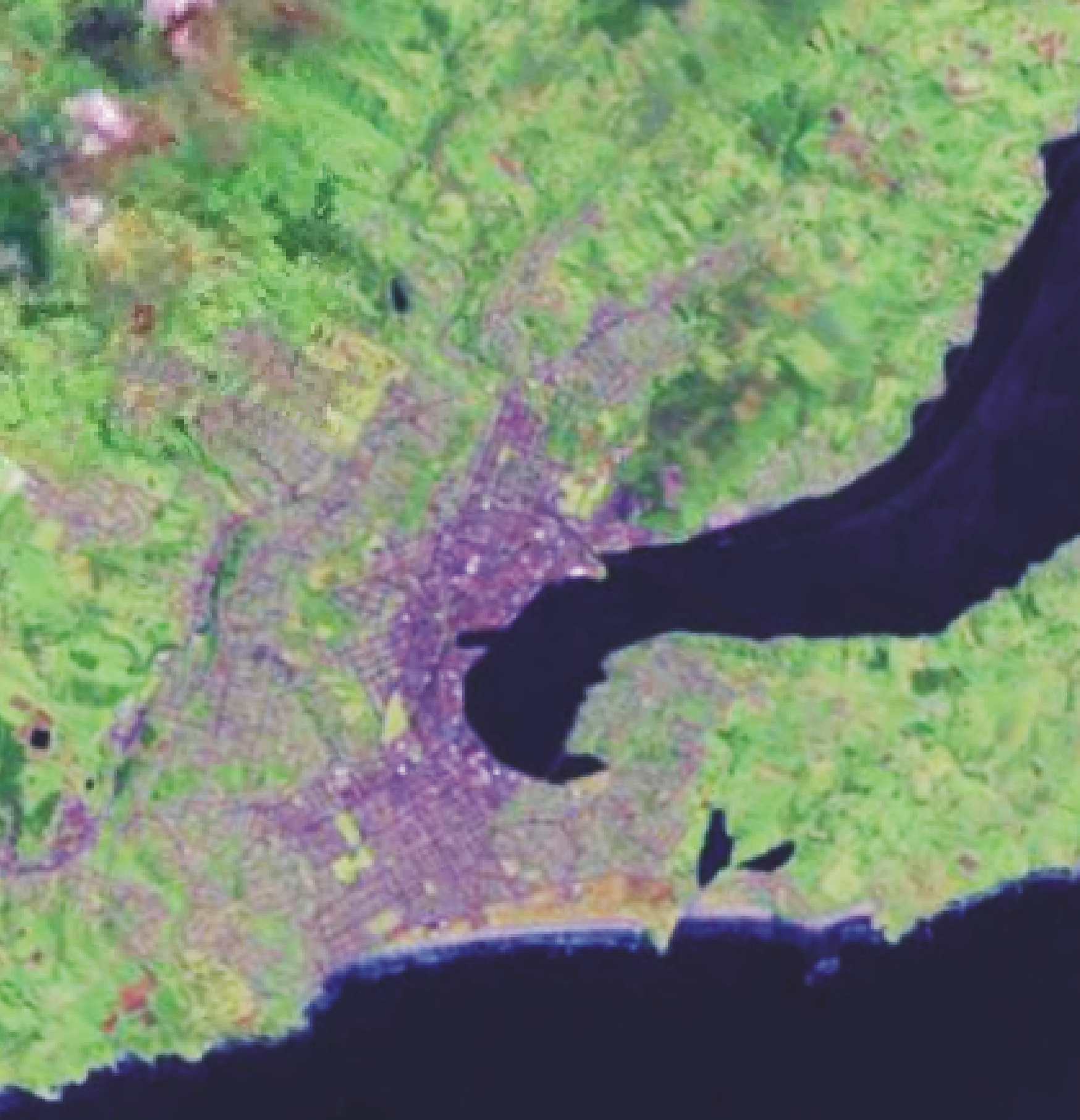
Remaining buildings and locations in Dunedin from before the gold rush of 1861.

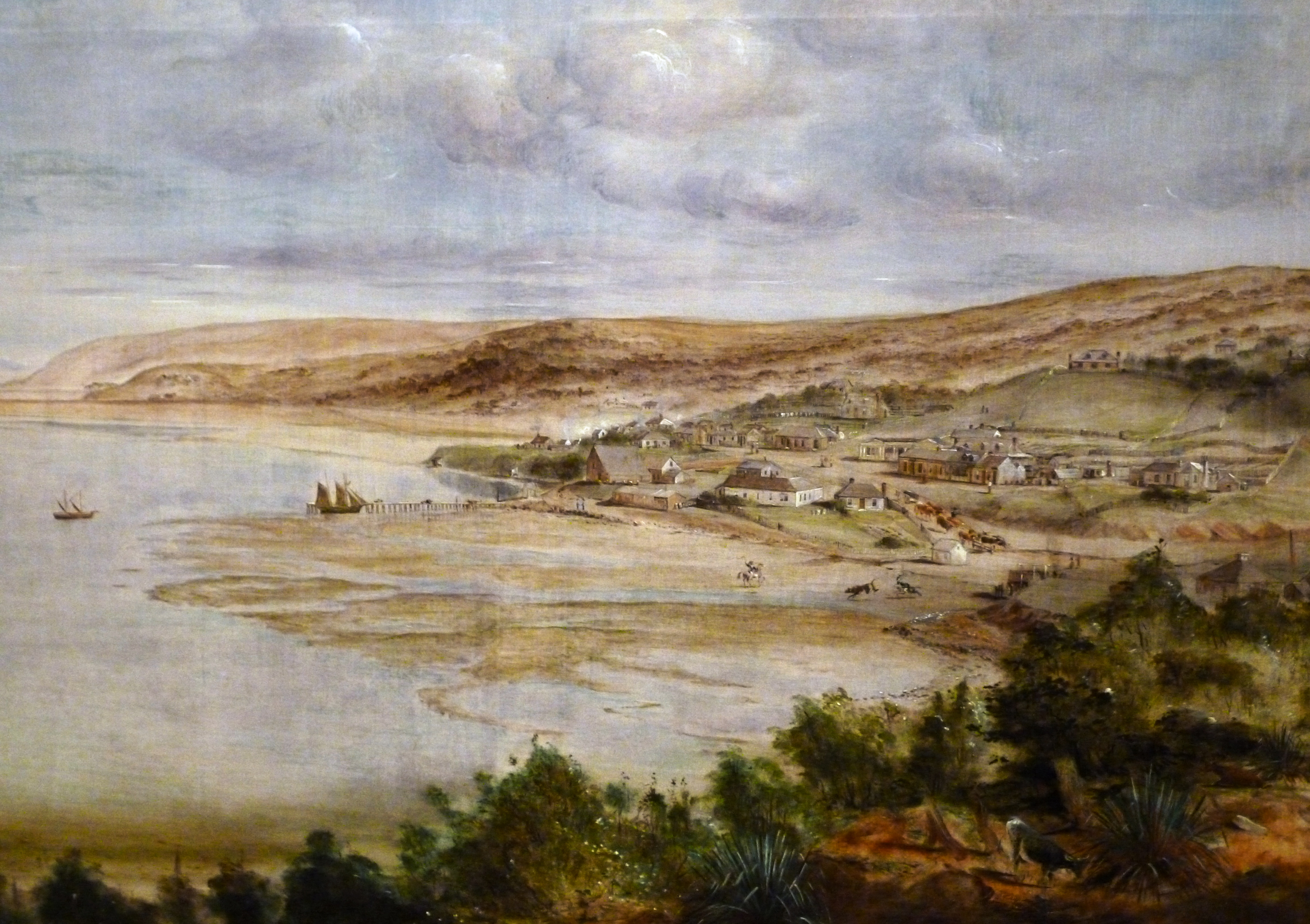
c. 1856 Dunedin by John Turnbull Thomson

As the upper harbour had no deep water port the two locations of Port Chalmers and Otakou, both in the lower harbour, were initially suggested as the colony's location. However, the lack of flat land on the Otago Peninsula and its proximity to Māori settlements lead to the upper harbour being settled as the site. The Lay Association of the Free Church of Scotland, through a company called the Otago Association, founded Dunedin at the head of Otago Harbour in 1848 as the principal town of its Scottish settlement. Initially the best 120,000 acres from the Otago block sale were divided into urban (quarter acre), suburban (10 acre) and rural (50 acre) blocks, 2400 properties altogether.

The name comes from Dùn Èideann, the Scottish Gaelic name for Edinburgh, the Scottish capital. Charles Kettle the city's surveyor, instructed to emulate the characteristics of Edinburgh, produced a striking, 'Romantic' design. The result was both grand and quirky streets as the builders struggled and sometimes failed to construct his bold vision across the challenging landscape. Captain William Cargill, a veteran of the war against Napoleon, was the secular leader. The Reverend Thomas Burns, a nephew of the poet Robbie Burns, was the spiritual guide.

With the founding of Dunedin the new colony, still reliant on Māori for food, began to clear land for farming. Initially harvests were erratic but generally superior to those in Britain. Once food production was stabilised grain was exported to Australia and some settlers started practicing the trades they had specialised in before immigration.

Dunedin prior to European settlement, much of the area of The Flat was poorly drained and marshy. Early settlement of the area took place along the hill fringes at Caversham and St. Clair. The arrival at St Clair of William Henry Valpy (1793–1852) in 1849 led to the first development of permanent roading in the area; Valpy, reputedly the wealthiest man in New Zealand, had a branch dray road built from Dunedin's central settlement to his St. Clair farm which ran along the edge of what is now South Dunedin.

In 1852 when the provinces were created Dunedin became the capital of the Otago Province, the whole of New Zealand from the Waitaki south. It was the only one of New Zealand's original six provinces to have a Māori name - a reflection of the area's European settlement in pre-colonial times. There were squabbles between 'the Old Identity' - the Scottish, Presbyterian majority, and 'the Little Enemy' - the English, Anglican minority. Specifically, there were frequent clashes between the Dunedin City Council and the Caversham Borough Council; Caversham, now a mainly residential suburb of Dunedin, was originally a thriving industrial town which had been founded by predominantly English settlers. The town quickly gained a reputation for mud and a line of branches were put down on the main street from 1848 to 1850 to make transport bearable. In 1846, an ordinance for the establishment and maintenance of a constabulary force was passed.

== The gold rush (1861) ==
Prior to 1861, Dunedin's population was small, numbering only two or three thousand people, but in 1861 the discovery of gold at Gabriel's Gully led to a rapid influx of people, giving Dunedin by 1865 the highest rate of population increase in the country. The new arrivals included many Irish, but also Italians, French, Germans, Jews and Chinese, all lumped together by the earlier settlers as 'the New Iniquity'. This reduced the dominance of the earlier Scottish immigrants and Presbyterianism in Dunedin. In 1865 the Catholic church established a strong presence and also the Jewish population established a synagogue.

In the gold rush some people made fortunes and built grand houses, however, slums also developed in the inner city. Many of Dunedin's first subdivisions had no proper sanitary arrangements. This included the housing developments of the mayor John Hyde Harris in 1867, who was warned and fined for their poor standard. At this time diseases such as typhoid and cholera were common due to poor drainage and sanitation. Assisted immigrants had to have their accommodation guaranteed for 48 hours after arrival and many spent this time in the Caversham immigration barracks built in 1872. The gold rushes of the 1860s in Otago meant police often had a difficult time keeping the peace.

=== What money can buy ===
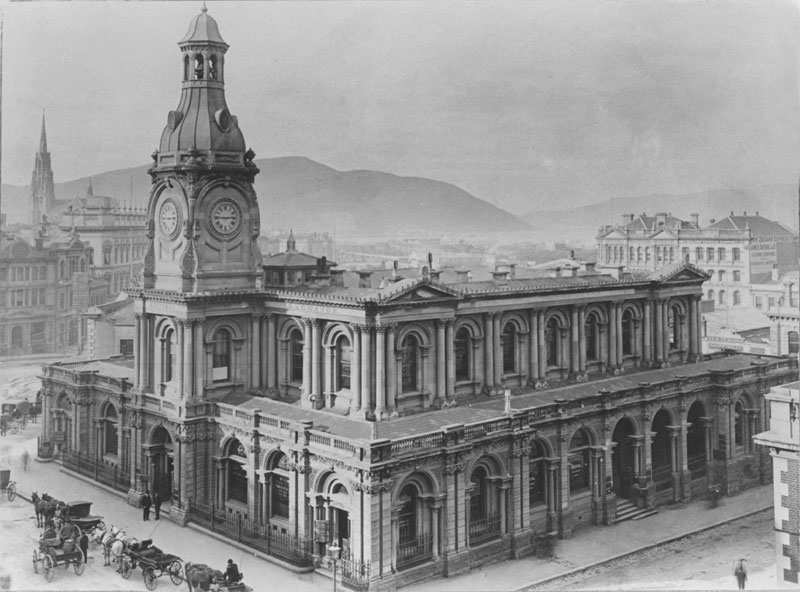
The Exchange (1868 till its demolition in the 1960s). The stock exchange and the first building to house the University of Otago (1871 to 1878).

During and directly after the Gold Rush in the 1860s and 1870s was a time of prosperity many institutions and businesses were established in Dunedin. The Otago Daily Times, Dunedin's daily newspaper, which is still in print, opened in 1861. The paper was founded by William Henry Cutten and Julius Vogel. and was a leading advocate for an independent Otago. The University of Otago was opened in 1871 with three professors teaching Classics and English, Mathematics and Natural Philosophy, and Moral Philosophy respectively. The university quickly expanded to teach mining (1872), Law (1873) and medicine (1875). A combination of money, good building stones and the then Scottish international pre-eminence in architecture saw a remarkable flowering of substantial and ornamental buildings, unusual for such a young and distant colony. R.A. Lawson's First Church of Otago and Knox Church are notable examples. Maxwell Bury's clock tower complex for the University and F.W. Petre's St Joseph's Roman Catholic Cathedral are others started in this time. In the central city the branches that held back the mud on the street were replaced with limestone blocks and a sewerage system started construction in 1863 finishing in 1908. The sewage was taken to Dunedin Harbour which was unpopular. Representing the local Scottish heritage Mornington was home to New Zealand's first golf course in 1872. Gas lighting was introduced to Dunedin Streets in 1863.

In 1865 the New Zealand exhibition was held in the city as showcase of Dunedin and Otago. The exhibition had displays from western Europe and the South Pacific and was seen as a way to prolong Dunedin's importance beyond the gold rush which had started to slow. The main pavilion was later to become Dunedin's hospital and was demolished in 1930 to make way for expansion.

With the rapid expansion of the city at the time of the Otago gold rush of the 1860s, settlement expanded, notably around what is now South Dunedin. Chinese settlers were notable among early residents in the St Clair area, and largely through their effort the swampy land inland from the beach was drained and converted into market gardens. Much of the young city's vegetable production was centred on Chinese allotments in an area close to what is now Macandrew Road, Forbury, and there were further allotments in both Andersons Bay and Tainui. Anderson's Bay In the late 19th century both a railway and ferry service connected this area with central Dunedin, but neither has survived. The ferry operated only during the 1890s, and the railway operated from 1877 until the early years of the twentieth century. The original intention was for a rail line to run along the shore of the peninsula to Portobello, but Andersons Bay was the furthest the line ever reached.

=== Changing the landscape ===
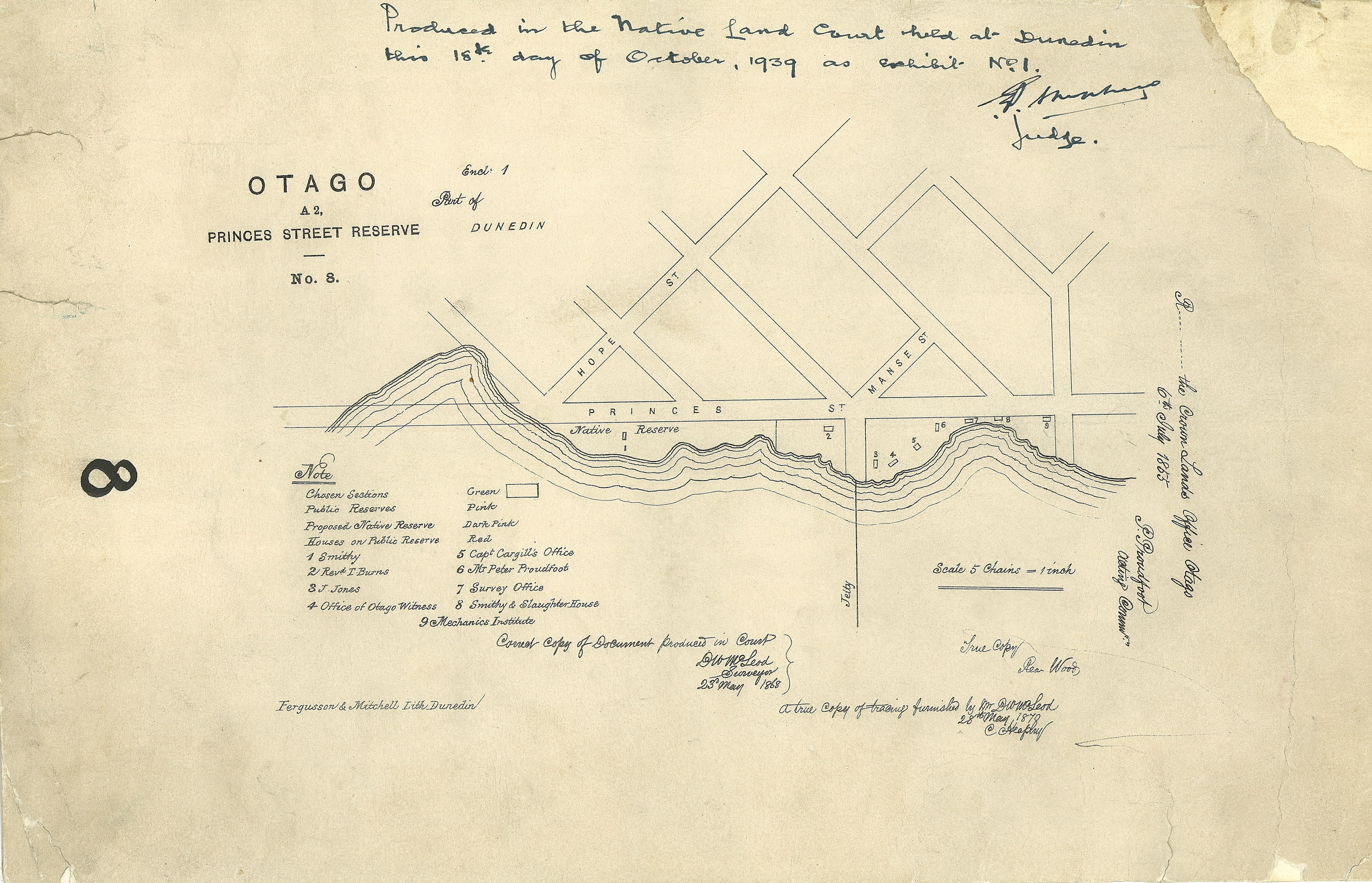
Dunedin in 1855 before the land reclamation, note the Māori reserve.

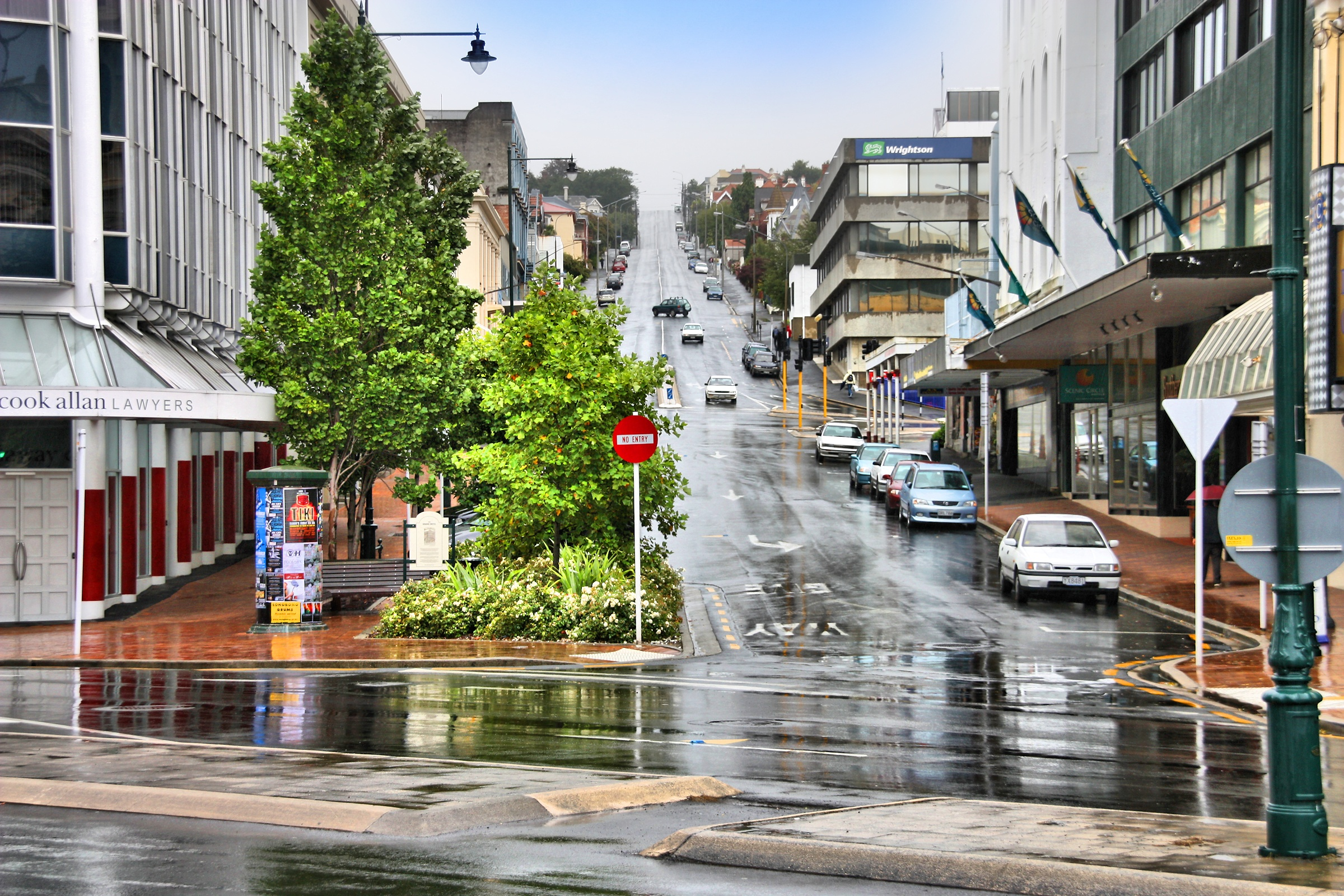
Steep streets like High Street remain evidence of grid plan created in Britain with little regard for local terrain.

The money and people flowing into Dunedin at this time required and funded changes to the natural environment of the upper harbour. By the early 1870s, Dunedin stood as a reconcilable equivocate of the modern city. The general street plan of a central city octagon with major north-south roads stretching the length of the city was created by the demolition of Bell Hill in the 1860s. Before 1858 the town was divided in two until a path was blasted between Princes St and the Octagon across the Nga-Moana-e-rua ridge. The material from this was used to reclaim the mudflats, starting with the Queens Gardens. The 1860s also saw the opening of the Forbury quarry to supply the city with building material. Harbour reclamation continued and isolated the Māori trading station on the waterfront which had been shown neglect from the city.

Dunedin's first railway, the Port Chalmers Branch, was opened on 1 January 1873 and was the first railway built to the newly adopted (3 ft 6 in (1,067 mm)) narrow gauge to open in New Zealand. The Main South Line, linking Dunedin with Christchurch and Invercargill, was opened on 22 January 1879. All these required massive earthworks along half the length of the harbour.

One of the world's oldest green belts, the Town Belt was planned in Scotland at the time of the advent of the Otago settlement in 1848. Residential areas outside the belt became separate boroughs, and were not amalgamated with Dunedin until much later. The Garden - New Zealand's oldest - was established in 1863 on a site surrounding the Water of Leith now occupied by the University of Otago. After extensive flooding in 1868, the gardens were moved to their current site in 1869. The name of the former site is still recorded in corrupted form in the now little-used name of Tanna or Tani (i.e., Botanic) Hill for the small but steep rise located close to the university's registry building).

Ross Creek dam was built between 1865 and 1867 to provide drinking water for the city. The lower reaches of the Leith are contained within concrete channels. These, and the various weirs located in the Leith's stream—notably just to the north of Woodhaugh Gardens, were built to prevent a repeat of the serious damage to Dunedin North by the highest recorded flood in March 1929. An earlier devastating flood occurred on the river in 1868. The original course of the Leith was, in fact, a meandering track through what is now the central city, emptying into the upper harbour where Cumberland and Stuart Streets now meet. The Toitu Stream (now largely built over) used to run from Mornington down Serpentine Avenue and Maclaggan Street, turning to run south to the harbour at the top of Water Street. The memory of this stream is preserved in the angle High Street crosses Princes Street and the name of the Toitū Otago Settlers Museum.

== The long depression and the first city (1873) ==
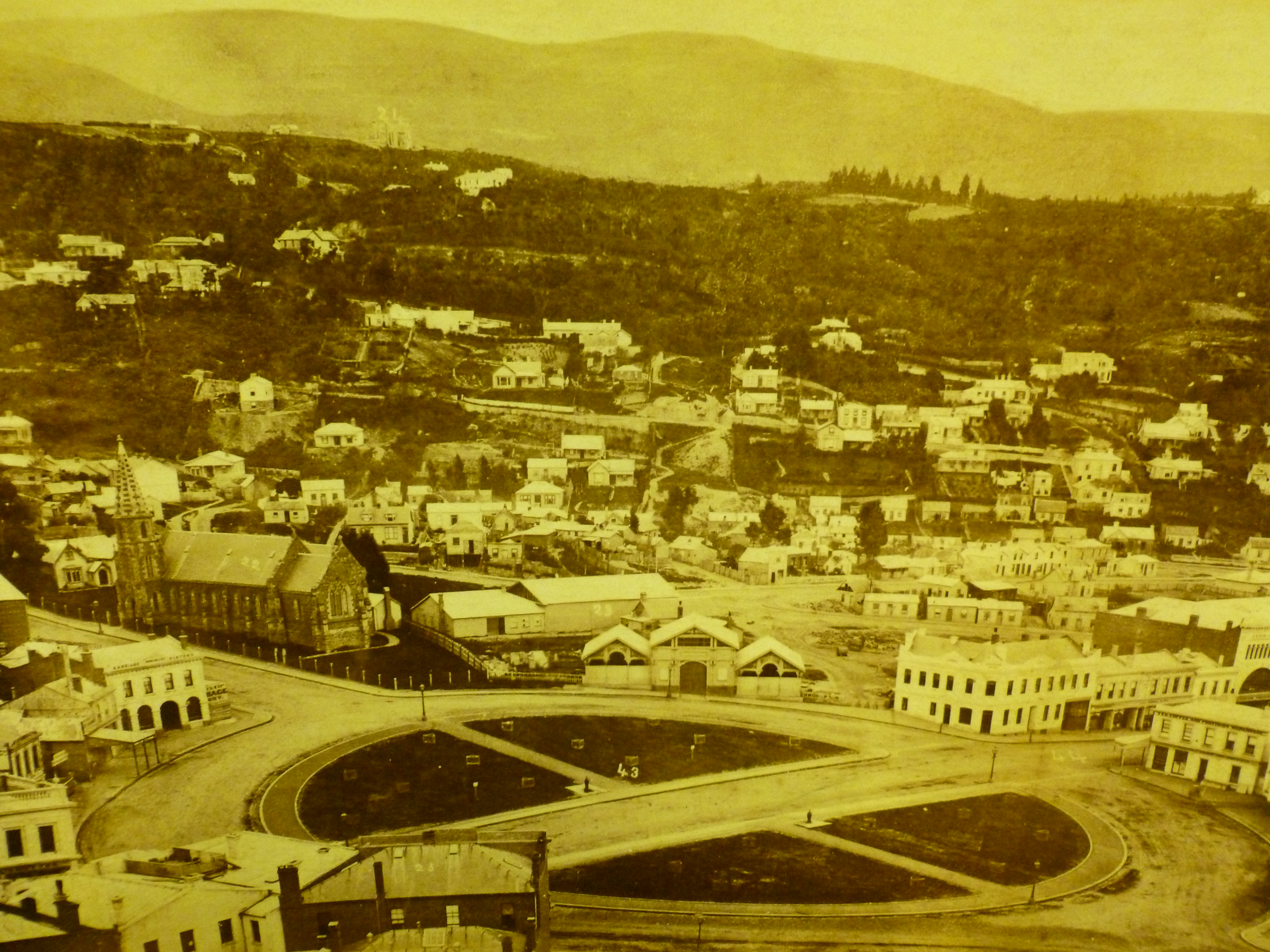
1874. Dunedin's Octagon from the First Church's spire

After ten years of gold rushes the economy slowed, this coincided with the long depression, however, Julius Vogel's immigration and development scheme brought thousands more especially to Dunedin and Otago before recession set in during the 1880s. The long depression led to drug ascendancy and depression and an increase in residence at the Seacliff Lunatic Asylum (built in 1884). Early in the 1880s the inauguration of the frozen meat industry, with the first shipment leaving from Port Chalmers, saw the beginning of a later great national industry. In the mid-1890s the gold dredging boom began and by around the start of the 20th century, Dunedin was experiencing another time of prosperity. Otago Girls' High School (1871) is said to be the oldest state secondary school for girls in the Southern Hemisphere. The first Catholic school was established in 1863. In 1893 Bell Tea started production in Dunedin.

The New Zealand South Seas exhibition (1889) was a chance for Dunedin, New Zealand's new first city, to show off its success.

Between 1881 and 1957, Dunedin was home to the Dunedin cable trams, being both one of the first and last such systems operated anywhere in the world. Carisbrook became a sports ground in the 1870s and had its first international cricket game in 1883.

Soon after the first electric telegraph line linking Christchurch and Lyttelton in 1862 a second network was built between Dunedin and Port Chalmers. The first phone call in New Zealand was made by Charles A. Henry between Dunedin and Milton on a home made device. The first telephone office was opened at Port Chalmers in 1879 to link shipping information to Dunedin. During the 20th century, influence and activity moved north to the other centres ("the drift north").

=== Panorama of city centre in 1874 ===
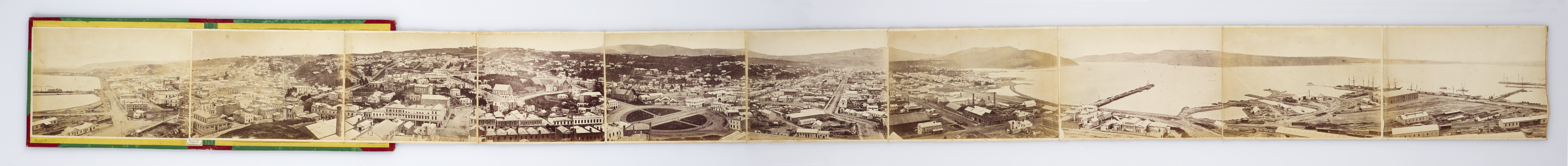

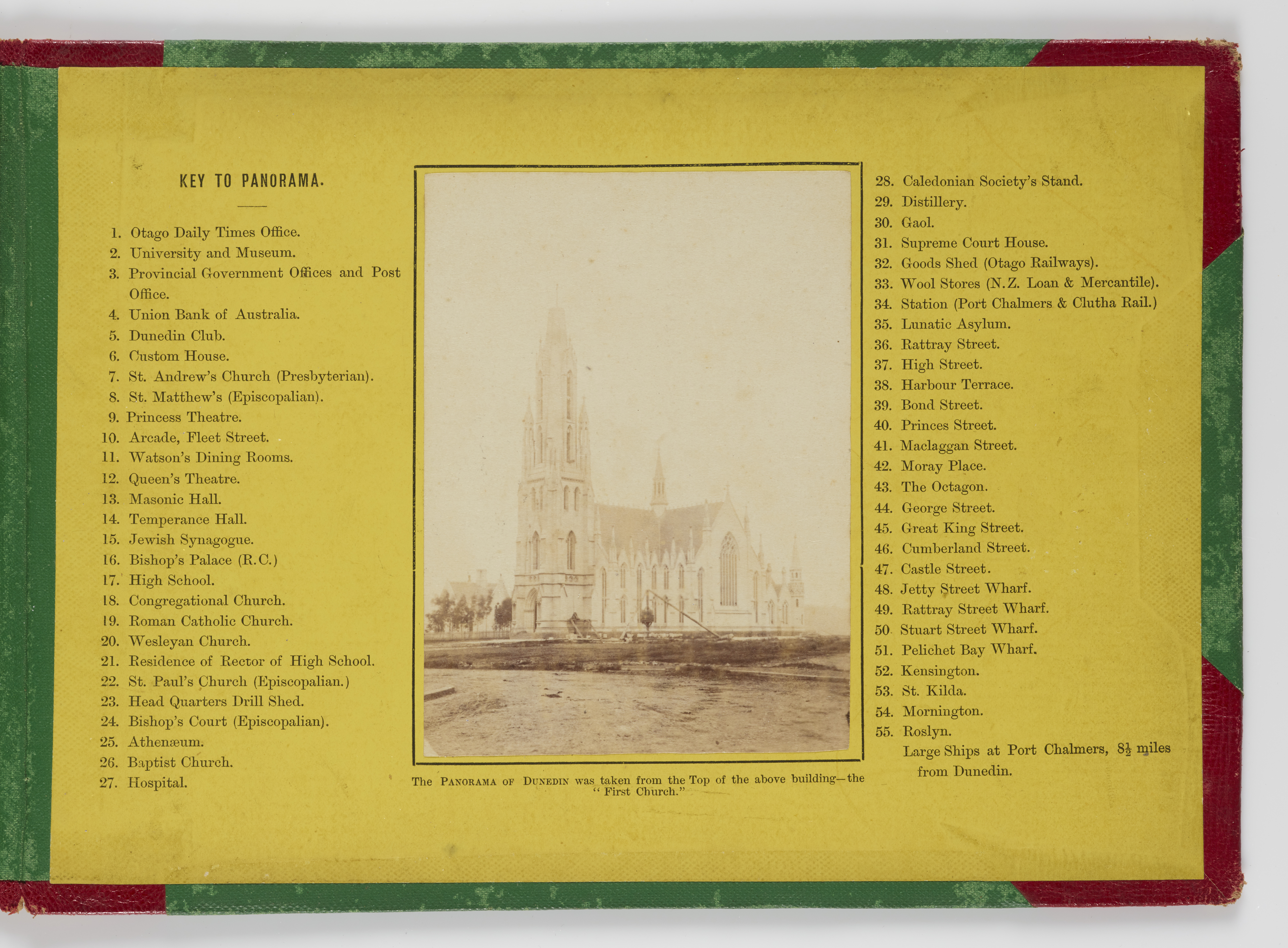

=== Political prisoners from Taranaki ===
When "a vibrant and productive Māori community was destroyed and total State control of all matters Māori, with full power over the Māori social order, was sought" at Parihaka in Taranaki a series of political prisoners often held without trial were kept in Dunedin. This occurred over two main time periods 1869-1872 and from 1879-1881. During this time the prisoners were used for labour in the construction of many building projects around Dunedin and to a lesser extent on the Otago Peninsula, This has been traditionally linked with a series of tunnels in the Anderson's Bay region. Most of the prisoners were formally released on 12 March 1872, departing by government steamship Luna on 20 March 1872, exchanging cheers with spectators farewelling them from the shore.

=== Women suffrage and social reform ===
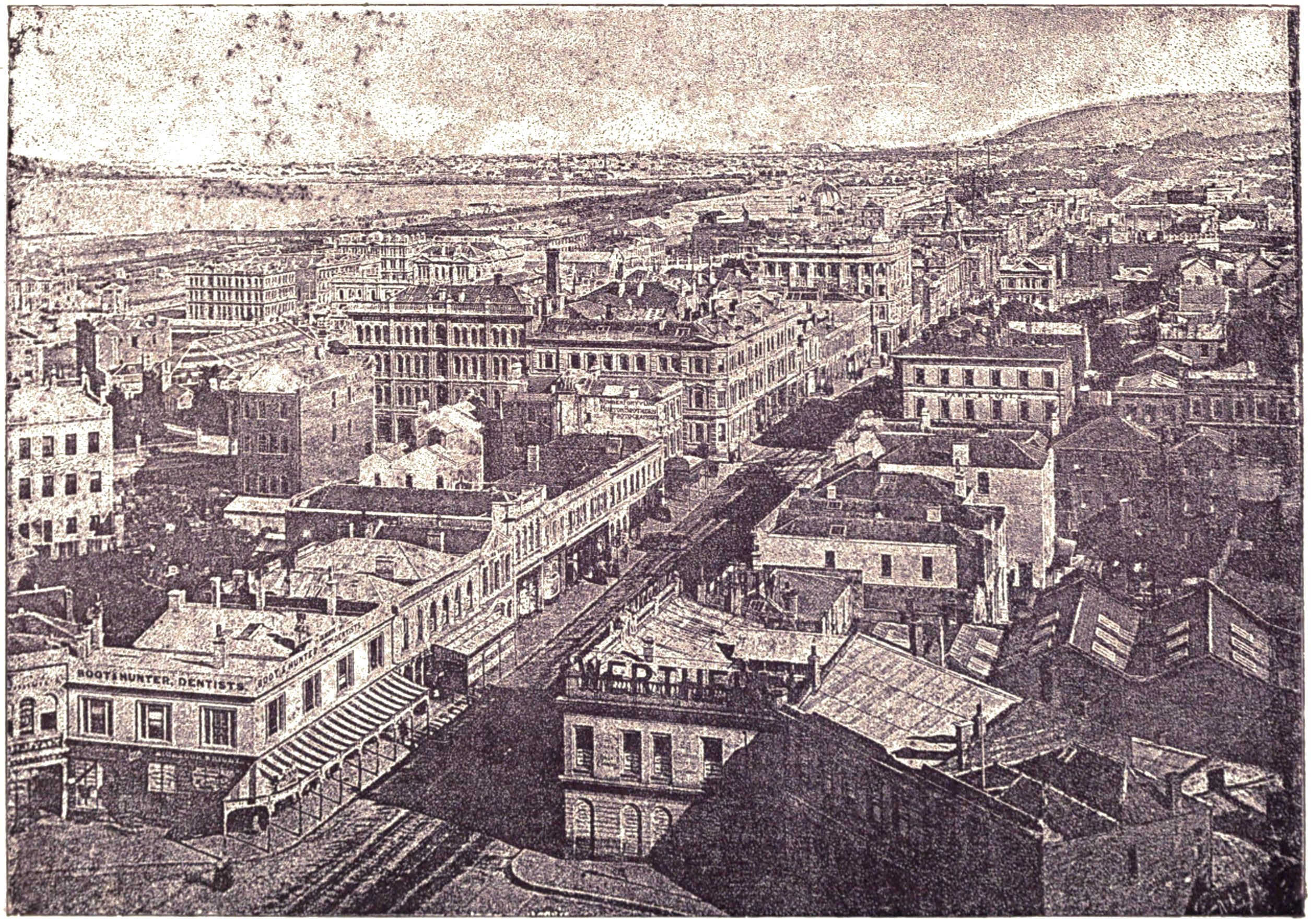
Princes Street in the 1890s. Over the 20th century Dunedin's retail centre gradually moved from here to George Street, on the northern side of the Octagon.

From the 1890s the Assyrians, religious refugees from what is now Lebanon, started to arrive, packing into the inner city slums largely occupied by Chinese. It was in this milieu John A. Lee grew up, the later Labour firebrand whose novels exposing these conditions would shock the country. in 1880 half the female workforce worked as domestic servants, the pay was poor. As new jobs became available as wages rose and less domestic servants were hired. The push for moral reform and women's equality led to the suffrage movement.

The 1893 Women's Suffrage Petition was the second of two mass petitions to the New Zealand Government in support of women's suffrage. About one-third of Dunedin women signed the petition, a higher percentage than any other city. New Zealand's first women's trade union (the Tailoresses) was created in Dunedin in 1889. From the late 1880s onwards middle-class reformers and worker activists investigated poor working conditions in Dunedin. Labour manifestos in the 1880s demanded the exclusion of Chinese as they were seen as working for low wages. In August 1890 the Maritime Council went on strike in sympathy with Australian maritime unionists. “ Difficult economic conditions led to the 'anti-sweating' movement led by a Presbyterian Minister, Rutherford Waddell, and the Otago Daily Times (under the editorship of Sir George Fenwick). From it came the establishment of the New Zealand Labour Party. Henry Fish, the MP for South Dunedin, represented liquor interests in Parliament, and was an opponent of Women's suffrage in 1890–1893 on their behalf. He paid his anti-suffragist campaigners a bounty for signatures collected, but lost credibility when some signatures were found to be fraudulent.

== Fighting the relative decline (early 1900s) ==
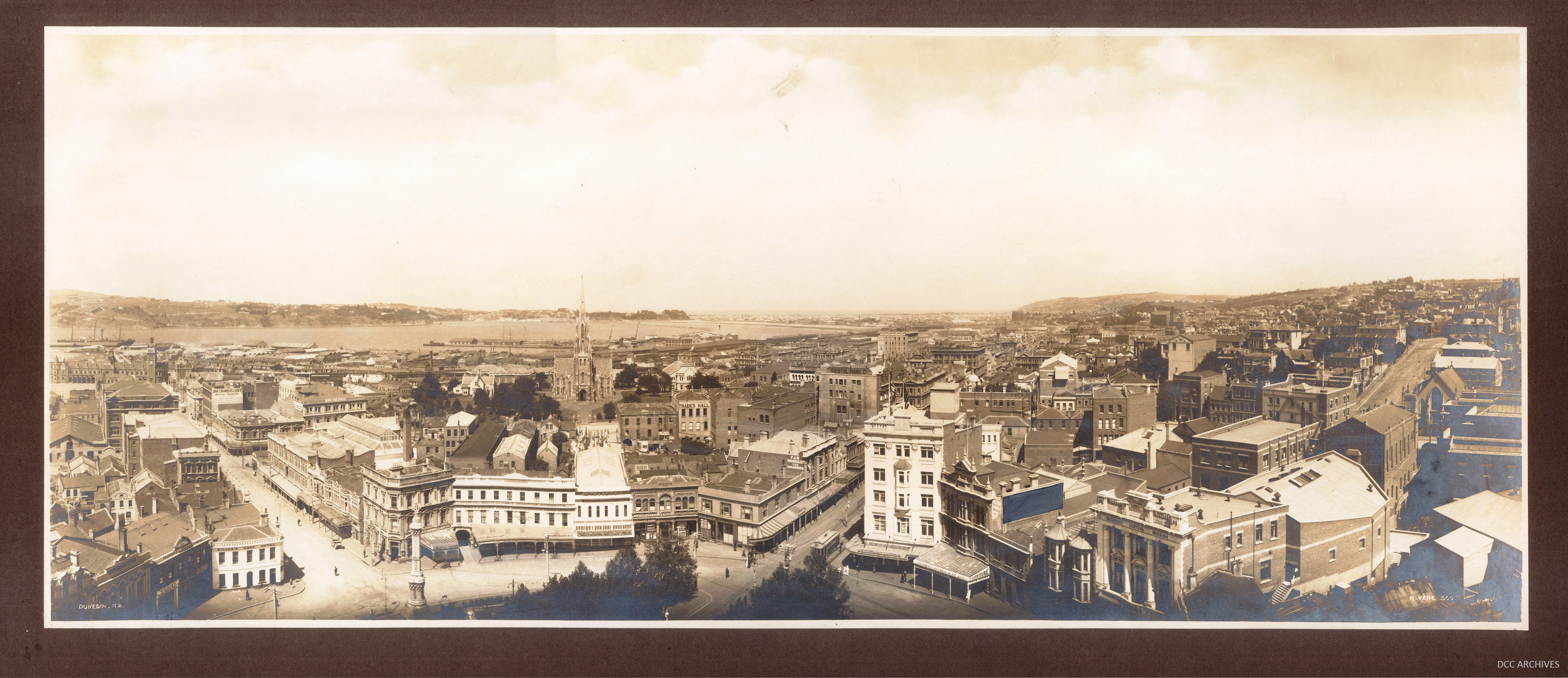
View of Dunedin looking south over the Octagon c. 1914

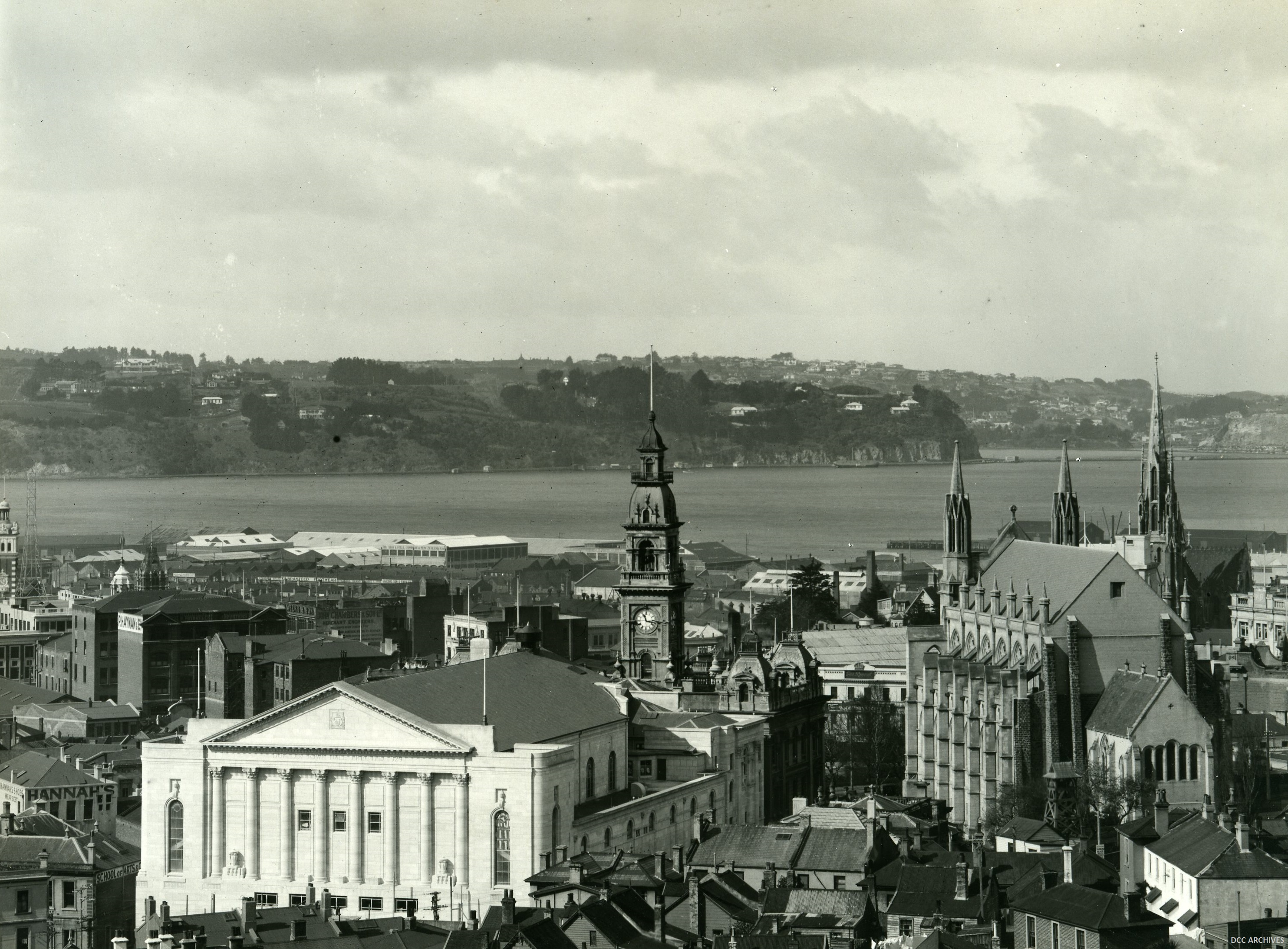
Newly Completed Dunedin Town Hall 1929

Relative to the rest of the country Dunedin was in decline, however, merchants like Edward Theomin built his grand town house Olveston and the Dunedin Railway Station was an opulent building, both completed in 1906. Reed publishing was founded in Dunedin in 1907. New Zealand's first radio was built in 1902 by J.L. Passmore a Dunedin teenager, who later managed a 10 km broadcast. Dunedin's Waipori hydroelectric plant started producing electricity in 1907 and in 1948 became the first remote-controlled power station in the Southern Hemisphere. The first municipal restrooms in Dunedin were only built in 1927. More companies and institutions were founded in these years, the Dunedin Public Art Gallery in 1884, the Otago Settlers Museum in 1898 and the Hocken Collections in 1910, all first of their types in New Zealand. But Dunedin was no longer the biggest city.

Determined to defeat the demographic gravity of the North Island and demonstrate their importance to the country, Otago and Dunedin sent proportionately more personnel to the First World War than the other New Zealand districts and the losses were proportionately greater (with 1831 men killed). The Anglican Cathedral, St. Paul's started in 1915 and consecrated in 1919 was the last great Gothic Revival building, and remains uncompleted. In another act of demographic defiance the 1925 New Zealand and South Seas Exhibition was staged at Logan Park to coincide with the five yearly census. 3.3 million people visited, more than attended any New Zealand exhibition before or since. The tramways' profits paid for a new town hall, still New Zealand's largest. But population growth continued to slow.

The first car owned by someone living in Dunedin was steam powered 1901 and delivery van 1904 (horses are largely phased out by the 1930s). In 1913, after public polling the road to Portobello was opened to motor ventricles, originally being closed to them due to safety concerns.

In January 1907 the sewerage pipe outfall into the harbour was improved to discharge at different tide levels. The Musselburgh pumping station was set up in 1908 and a pump installed in 1911 for more suction. The sewage was then moved to Lawyers Head and then extended off the coast at St Kilda beach.

This was a fertile period in the visual arts. William Mathew Hodgkins, the 'father of art in New Zealand' - according to his daughter Frances Hodgkins - certainly presided over a vital scene. From the interlocking circles of Turneresque Romantic landscape painters and younger impressionistic practitioners, G.P. Nerli helped to launch Frances Hodgkins on her career as New Zealand's most distinguished expatriate artist.

In this time too people started to notice Dunedin's mellowing, the aging of its grand old buildings, with writers like E.H. McCormick pointing out its atmospheric charm. R.N. Field at the art school inspired young students to break from tradition with M.T. (Toss) Woollaston, Doris Lusk, Anne Hamblett, Colin McCahon and Patrick Hayman forming the first cell of indigenous Modernism. The Second World War saw the dispersal of these painters, but not before McCahon had met a very youthful poet, James K. Baxter, in a central city studio.

=== The Great War ===
Otago and Southland volunteers for the First World War gathered and trained at Tahuna Park in 1914. They were then deployed as the Otago Infantry Regiment and Otago Mounted Rifles Regiment to Gallipoli and the Western front. Otago University helped train medical personnel as part of the Otago University Medical Corps. They supplied or trained most of the New Zealand Armies doctors and dentists. After the war the returning servicemen were given support but found women doing many jobs that had previously been reserved for them. The Spanish flu struck Otago at a similar time September to November in 1918.

=== Images of the city of Dunedin in 1925 ===
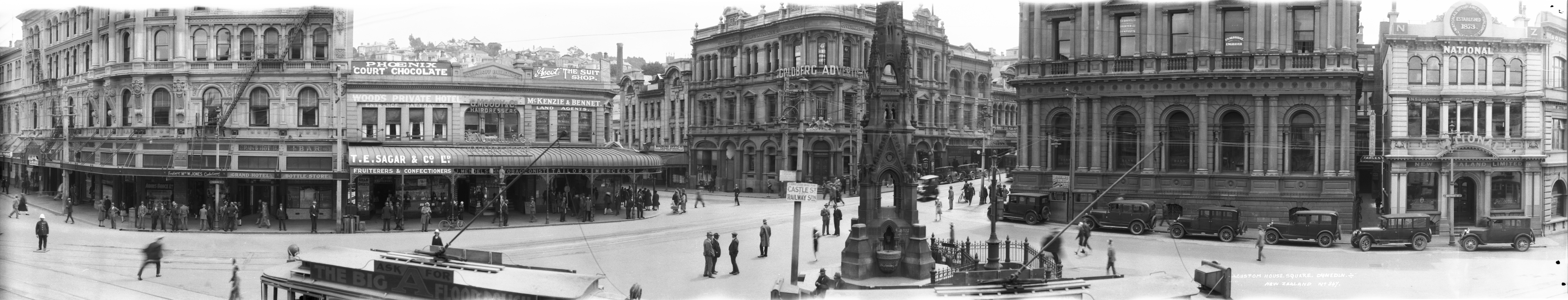
Custom House Square

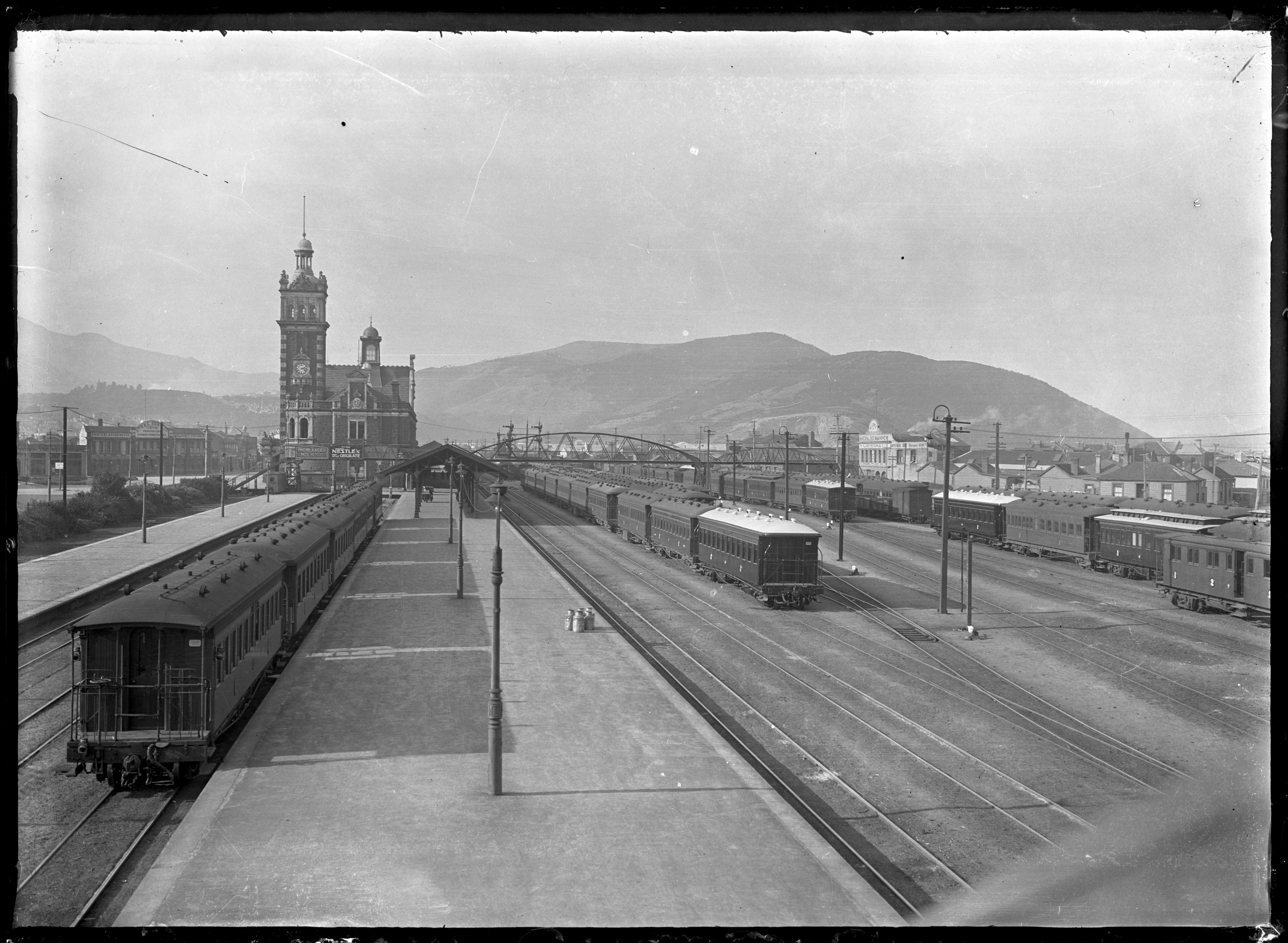
Dunedin Railway Station

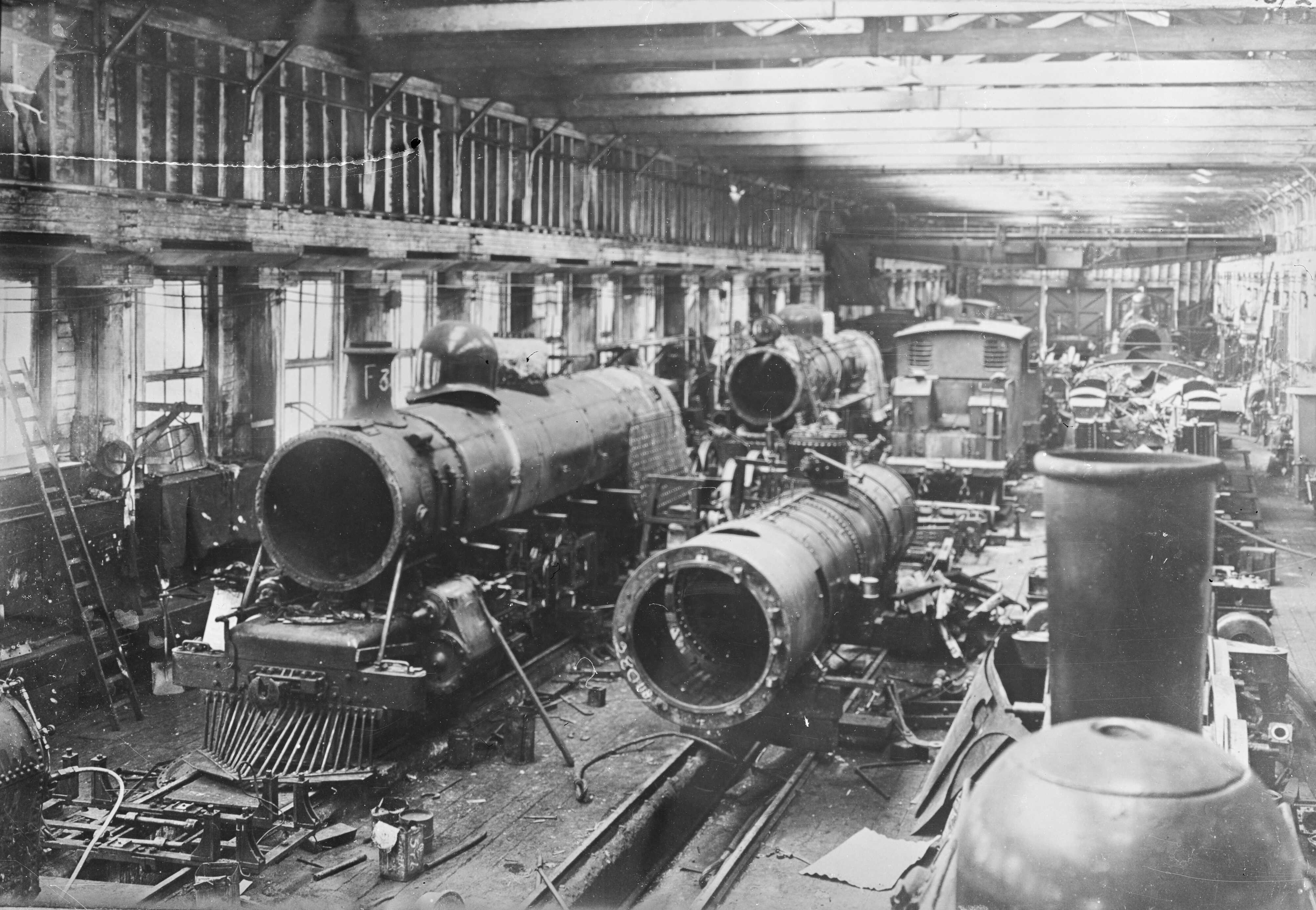
Hillside Railway Workshops

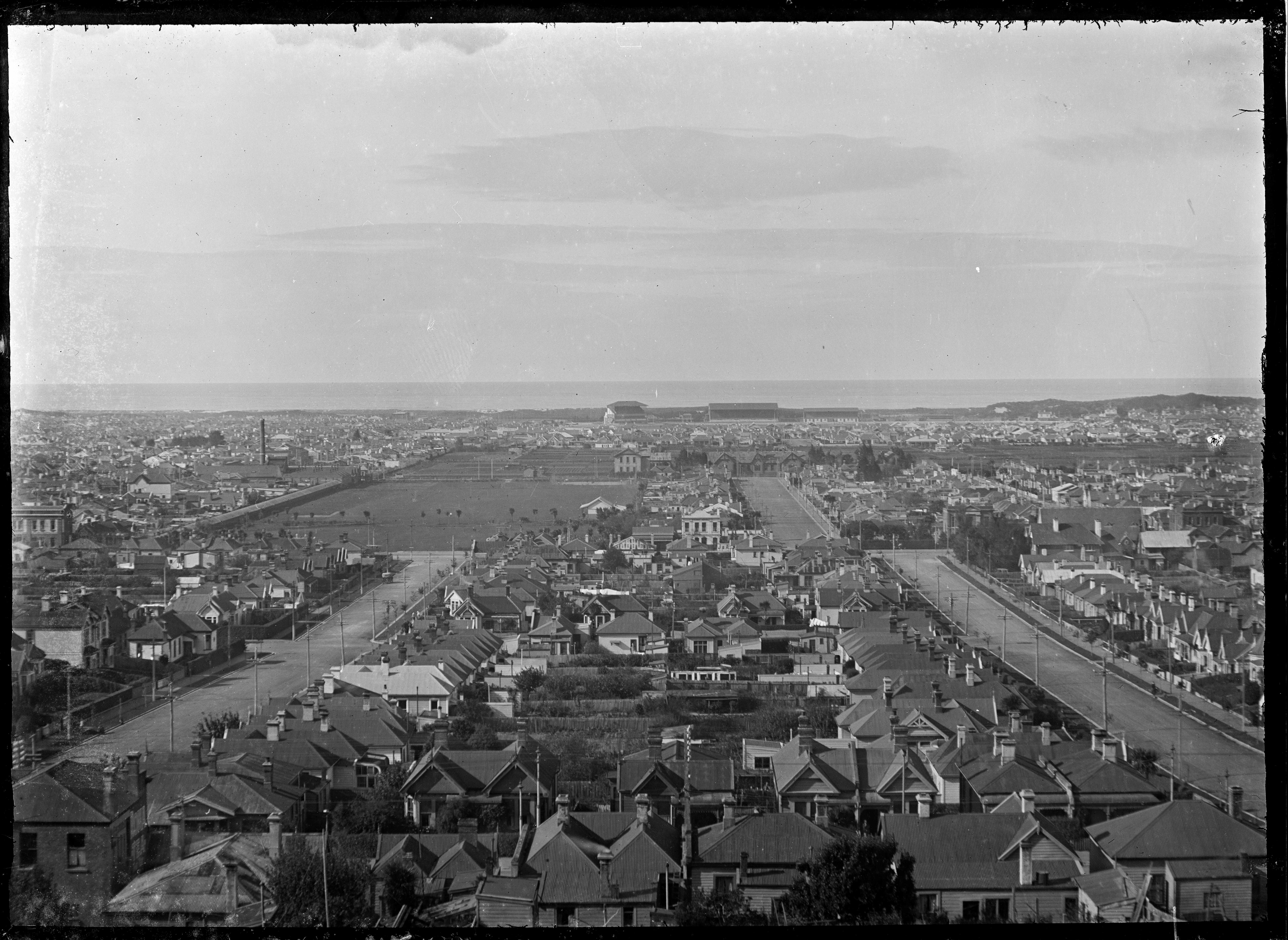
South Dunedin

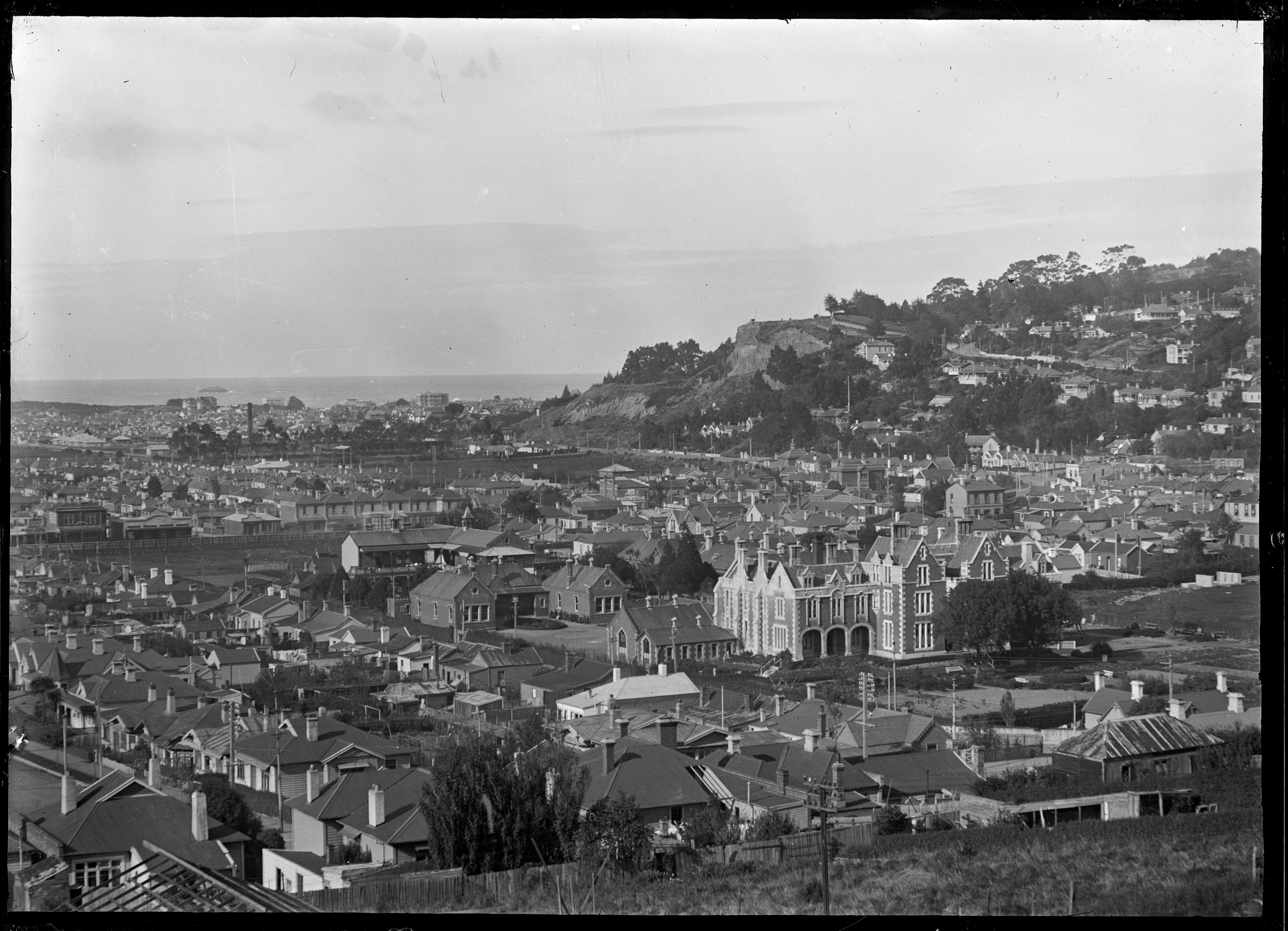
South Dunedin

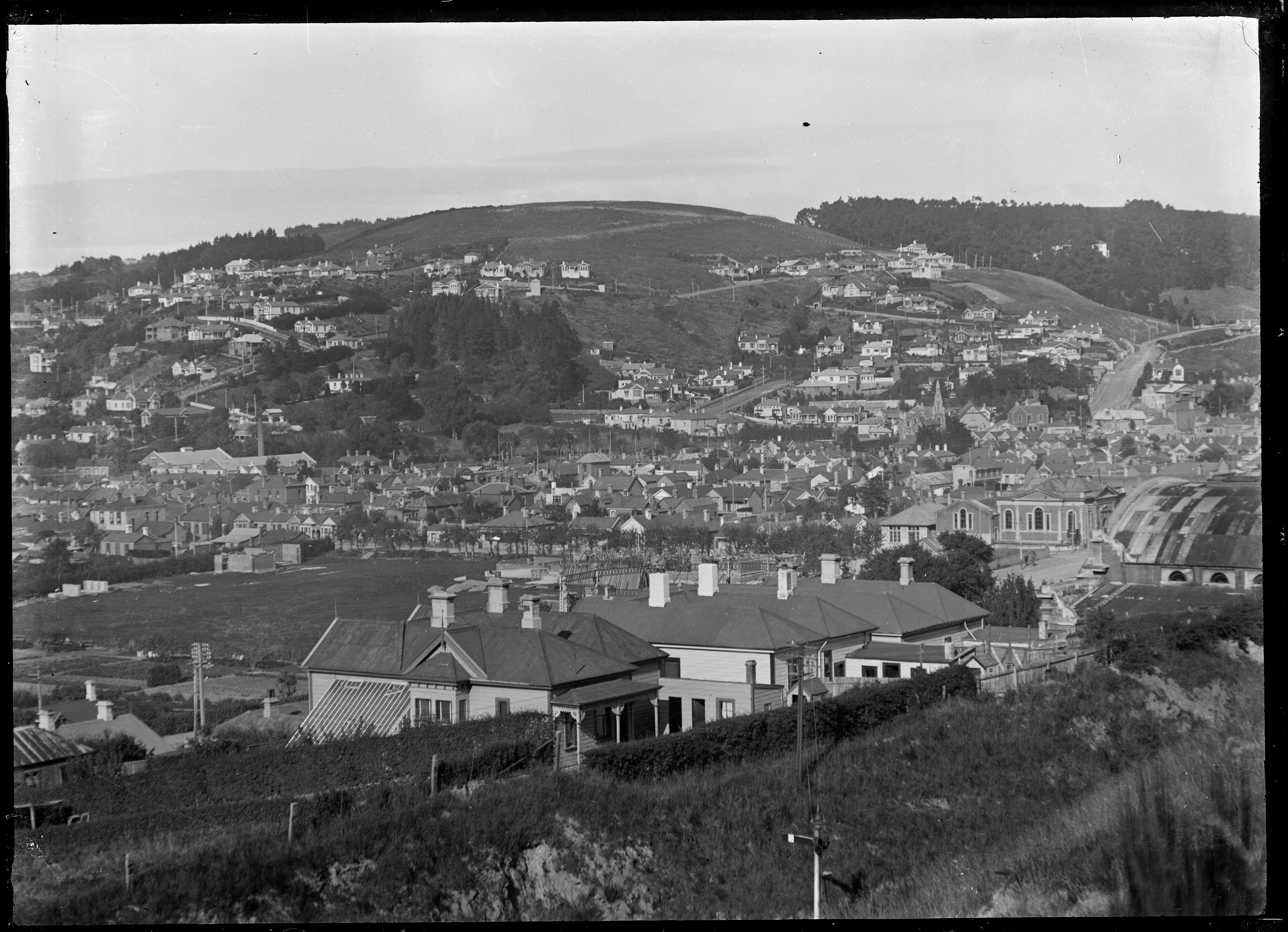
South Dunedin

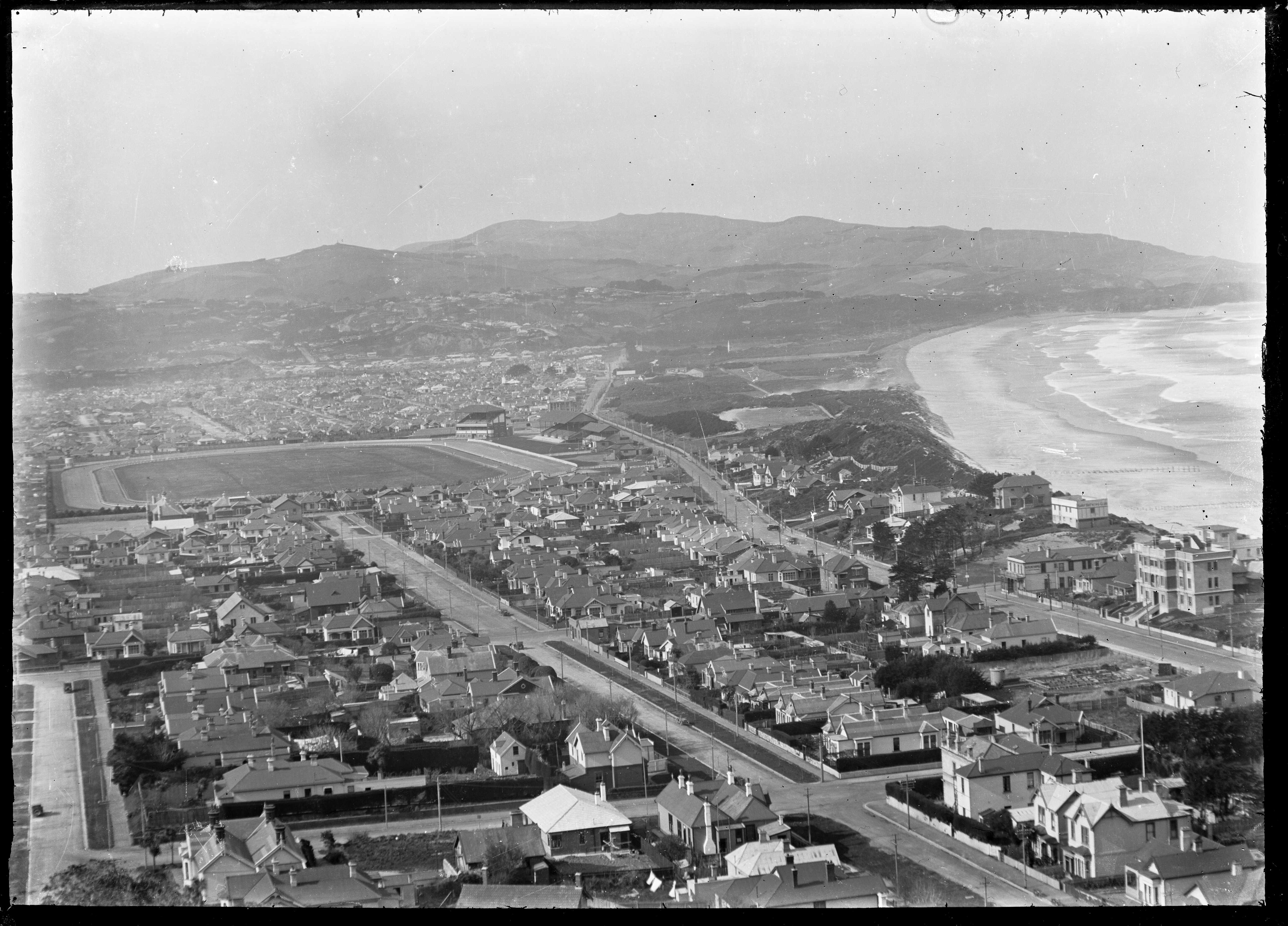
St Clair

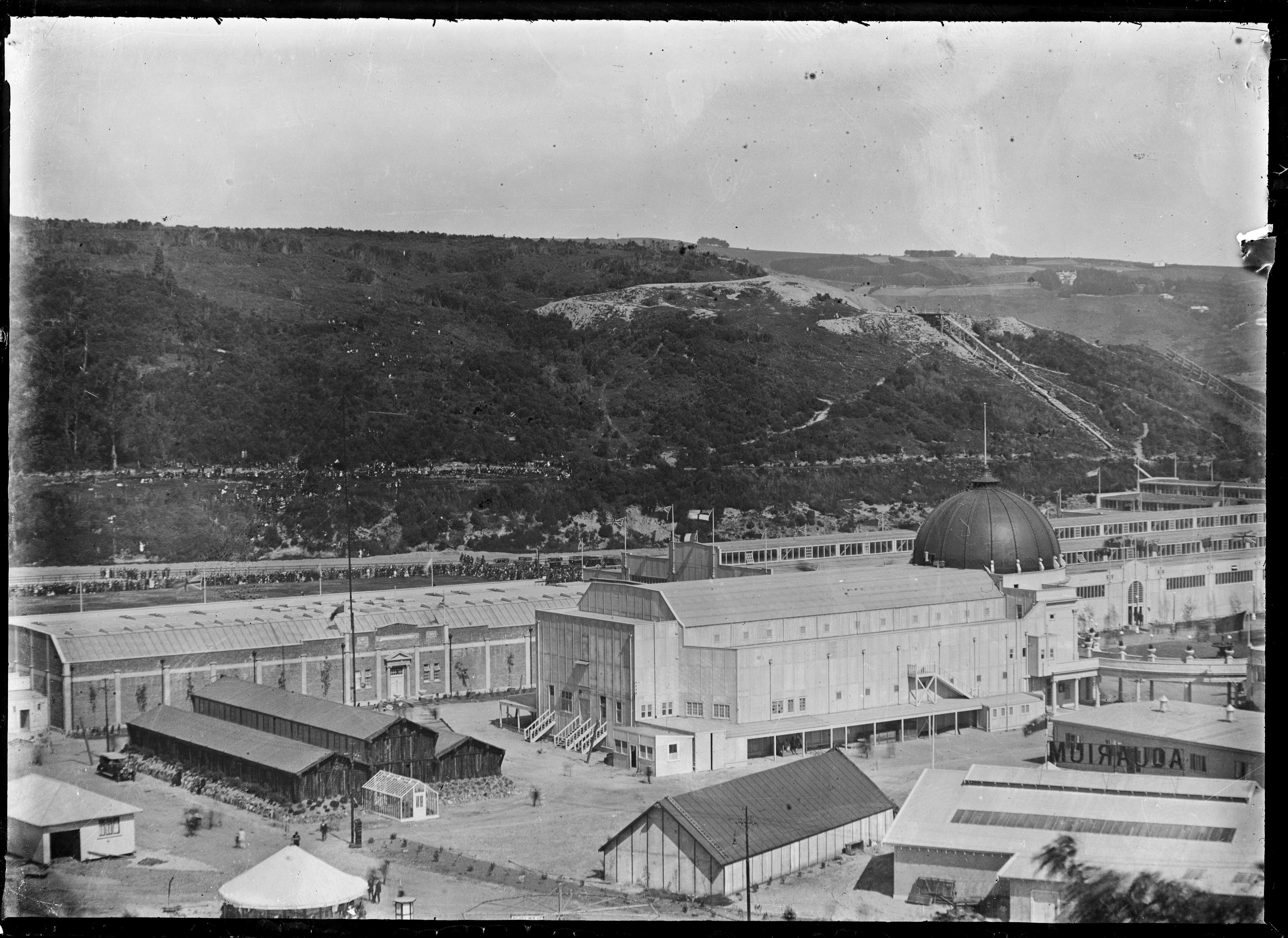
3rd Dunedin exhibition

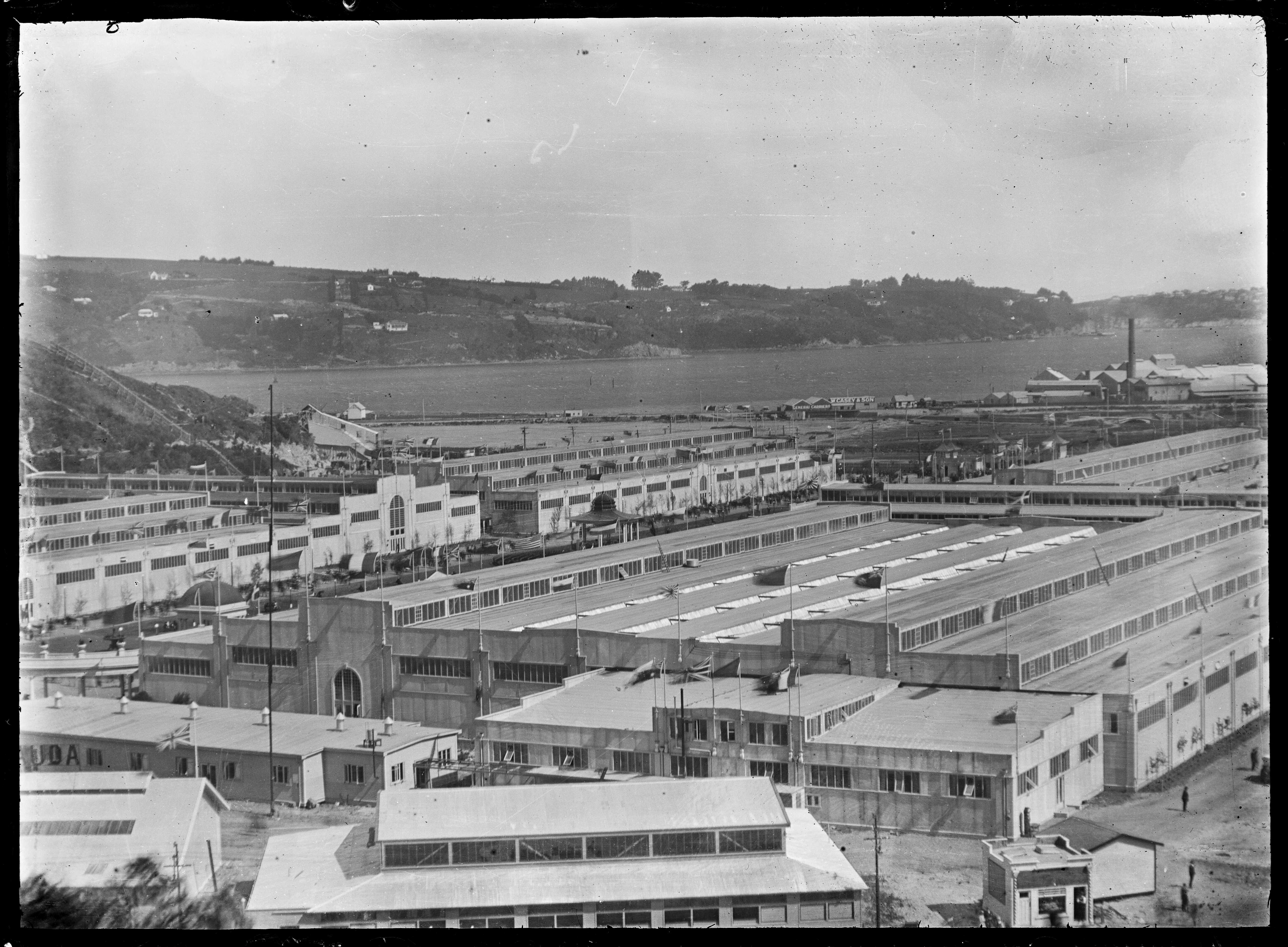
3rd Dunedin exhibition

=== The flood of 1929 ===
Central Dunedin was heavily inundated with water twice during the 1920s, in 1923 and then in March 1929. The 1929 flood remains Dunedin's worst-ever flood. It was caused by the 1929 New Zealand cyclone, an ex-tropical cyclone which had earlier caused damage to parts of the Bay of Plenty. Heavy rainfall occurred from Christchurch to Balclutha, with Dunedin bearing much of the brunt of the storm. Several bridges were washed out along the Water of Leith, and much of the city was flooded, with over 500 houses damaged from North East Valley to Caversham. In the aftermath of the storm, flood prevention work was installed along much of the lower reach of the Leith, including weirs and concrete channels.

=== The Great Depression and world war ===
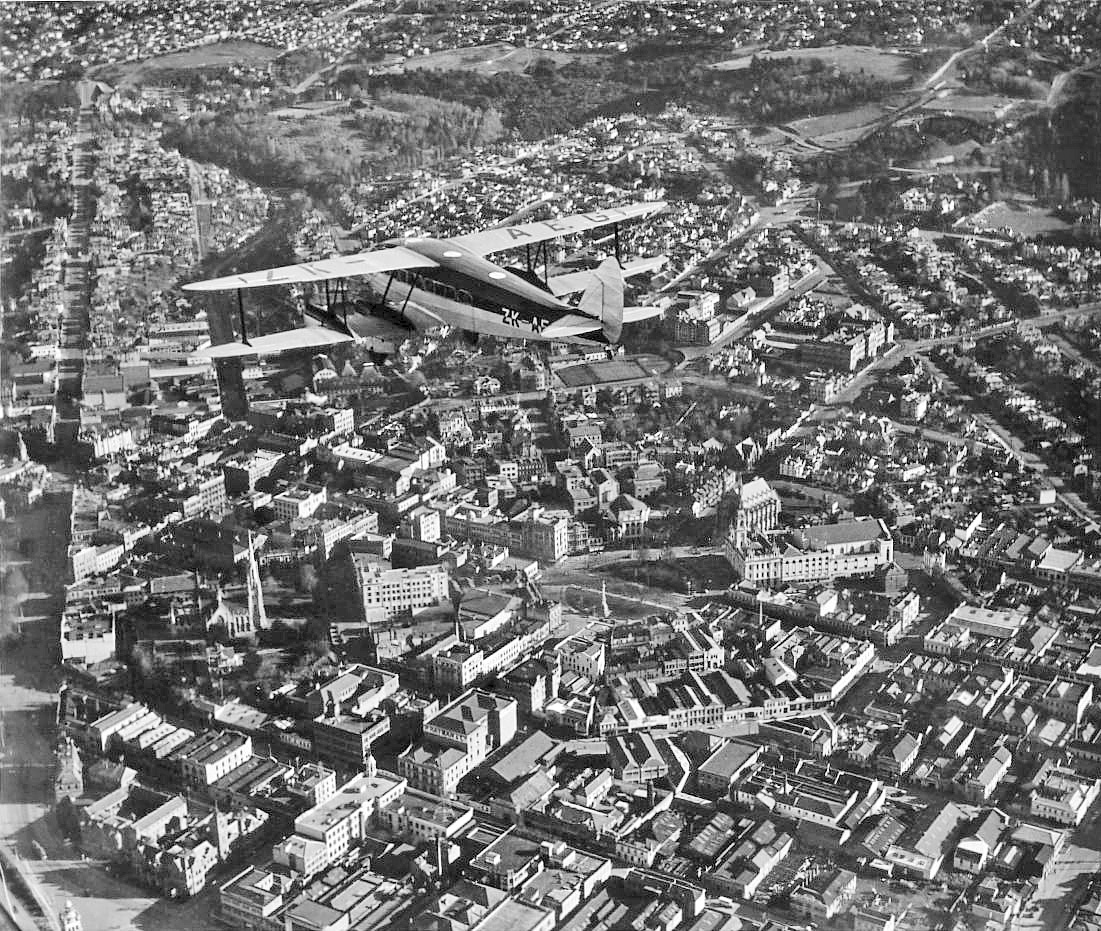
A Union Airways of New Zealand de Havilland DH.86 flies over the Octagon in the 1930s.

Dunedin's population had a slight decline during the depression, when it fell by 3,000 to 82,000. With the 1930s an international depression set in. In early 1932 there were urban riots later repeated in the northern centres. Despite the city's slow growth, the university continued to expand boosted by its monopoly in health sciences. The developing Colleges and Halls saw the establishment of a student quarter.

== Post war (1945–present) ==
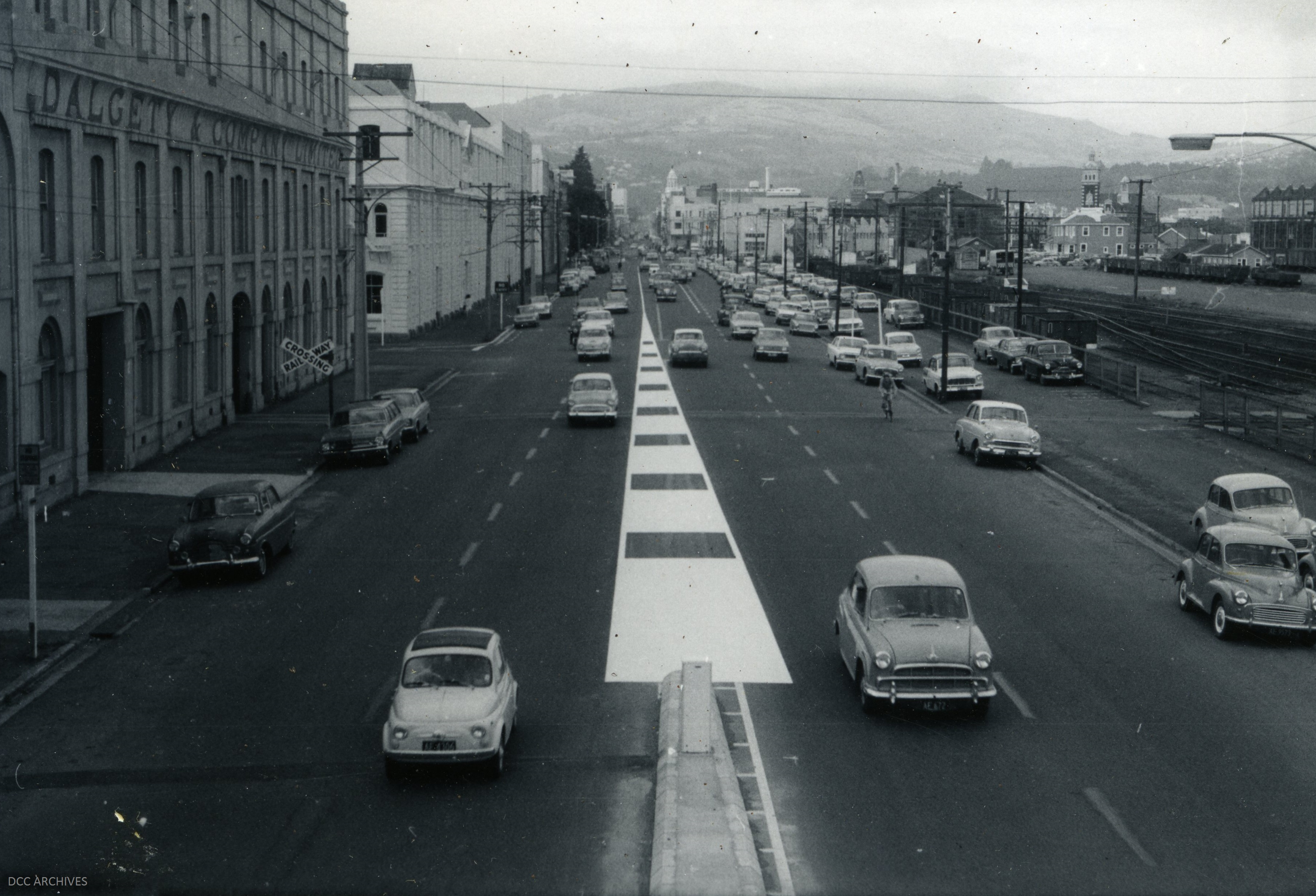
Cumberland Street new one way system opens (1968)

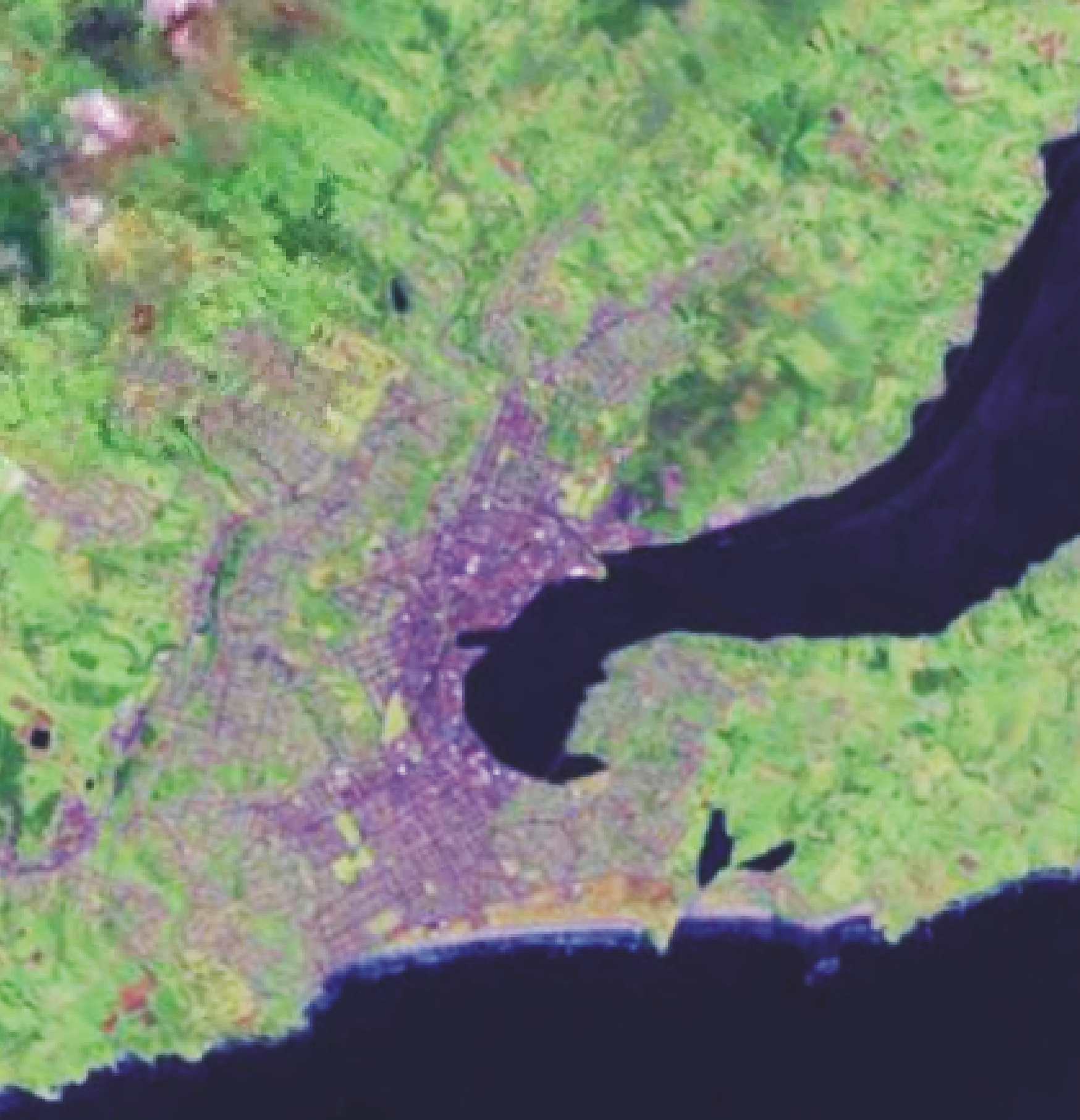
Suburban growth around Dunedin City after 1861

After the war prosperity and population growth revived, although Dunedin trailed as the fourth 'main centre'. The university expanded, the rest of the city did not.

This was a culturally active time with the university's new privately endowed fellowships for writers, composers and visual artists, bringing James K Baxter, Ralph Hotere, Janet Frame, Hone Tuwhare and others, back to the city, or to Dunedin for the first time, where some stayed and many lingered. Modernist buildings appeared, such as the Dental School and Ted McCoy's Otago Boys' High School and Richardson building, evidence that this born-in-Dunedin designer could find a way of marrying Modernism to the revivalist inheritance.

From 1953 till 1975 Dunedin had its first female member of parliament, Ethel Emma McMillan, who was also the first women to be elected to the Dunedin City Council in 1950.

An urban marae had been suggested in Dunedin since the 1960s but it was not until 1980 that the Arai Te Uru Marae opened. This still made it one of the first urban marae in the country. A political motivated arson destroyed the buildings in 1997 and they were reopened after a rebuild in 2003. The marae also provided accommodation and support for Bhutanese refugees, displaced by the 2011 Christchurch earthquakes.

Started with four regional stations in 1969 they were networked, Dunedin and Wellington one channel and Auckland & Christchurch the other in 1980 became one system

Between 1976 and 1981 the city went into absolute decline. This lent support to the proposal to establish an aluminium smelter at Aramoana as one of Sir Robert Muldoon's 'think big' projects. Its economics were doubtful and once exposed by Otago Professor, Paul Van Moeseke, the government backed off. But the city became bitterly divided.

In 1974 Dunedin was hit by a magnitude 4.9 earthquake, causing substantial damage to rare buildings and many chimneys throughout the city. In 1979 Abbotsford landslip occurred destroying half the suburb, but with no loss of life.

In the 1980s, these trends were paralleled by a burgeoning popular music scene which made Dunedin and its "Dunedin sound" well known to rock music fans. Local bands such as The Chills, Straitjacket Fits, The Clean, and The Verlaines became popular both nationwide and internationally.

In 1972, 1037 new born babies were selected for involvement in the Dunedin Multidisciplinary Health and Development Study (or Dunedin Longitudinal Study). this study has continued to the current day, following these babies to adulthood and giving insight into the city of Dunedin and New Zealand culture and health in general.

=== Building a modern city ===
The main roads through the city changed to a one-way system in 1968. The first trolley bus went into operation in 1950 going to Opōho. By 1960s Dunedin had 76 trolly buses which replaced trams, the oil shock of the late 70s saw them become common again. By 1983 all-electric buses had been removed in favour of diesel. Communications changed slowly, with cell phones being brought in 1987 and allowed texting in 1998. The first computer arrived in Dunedin in 1963 for the Casbury Fry Hudson ltd manufacturing company.

The Green Island landfill opened in 1981 Fluoride started to be added to Dunedin's drinking water in 1966, and is currently used in 85% of homes. Storm water was separated from sewage in the 1980s.

=== Reinvention ===
Population decline steadied and by 1990 Dunedin had re-invented itself as the 'heritage city' with its main streets refurbished in Victorian style and R.A Lawson's Municipal Chambers in the Octagon restored. The university's growth accelerated. North Dunedin became New Zealand's largest and most exuberant residential campus. In 1989 local body reform saw the creation of the present huge territorial Dunedin—the country's largest city by area until the creation of Auckland Council in 2010. The city continued to refurbish itself, rehousing the Dunedin Public Art Gallery in the Octagon in 1996 and buying and restoring the Railway Station, a new stadium and recently completed a large development of the Otago Settlers Museum. New cycle lanes are being built throughout the city and along the western side of the harbour. The Ngai Tahu treaty claim of 1849 was resolved in 1998 creating a new economic power in the South island. The Dunedin Police Station building was constructed in the 1990s and is occupied by New Zealand Police on a long-term basis.

In 1995 David Bain was convicted of murdering five members of his family in Dunedin; he was later acquitted at a retrial in 2009. Speculation about the case continued long after Bain was acquitted, including whether or not he should receive compensation for the years he spent in prison.

In 2014 Dunedin won the "Gigatown" competition, giving residents a 1Gbit/s connection at the normal internet price. The fiber cable rollout reached 11,615 homes and companies, saving Dunedin an estimated 15 million dollars.

In June 2015, South Dunedin experienced heavy flooding after a low weather system brought heavy rain to the coastal Otago region. Flood damage was exacerbated by the suburb's high water table and the breakdown of the Portobello pumping station. 1,200 homes and businesses were damaged by flood damage, with total flood damage reaching $138,000,000.

== Vanished Dunedin ==
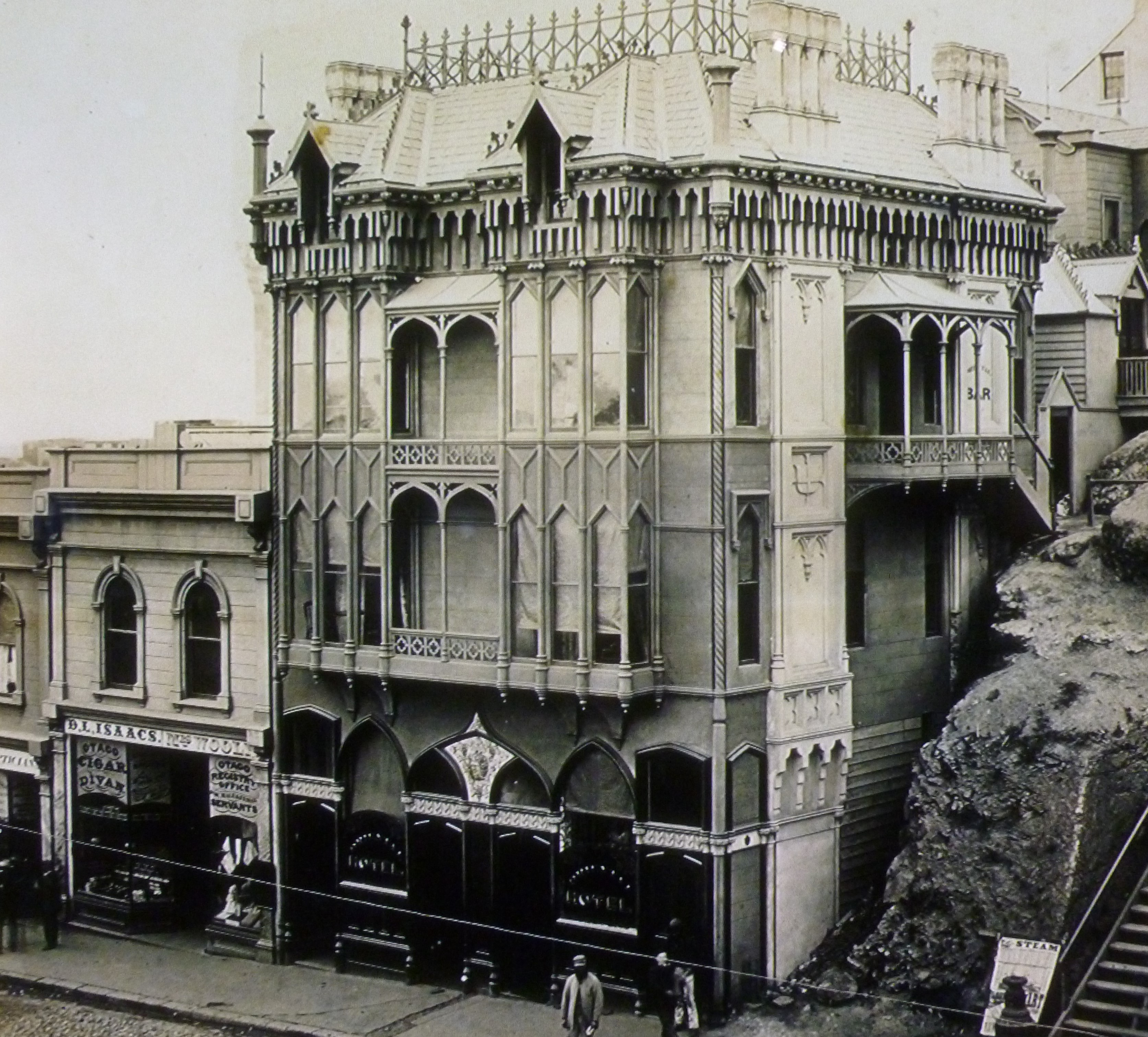
Oriental Hotel 1863

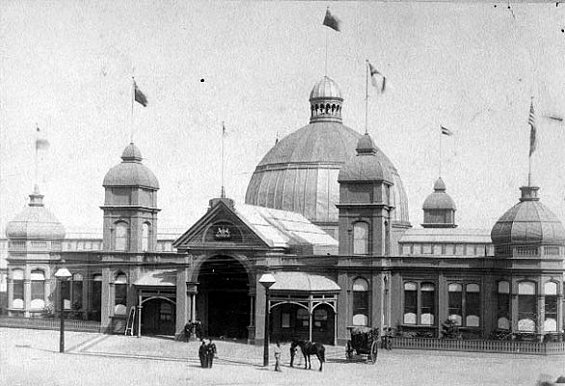
1st South Seas Exhibition

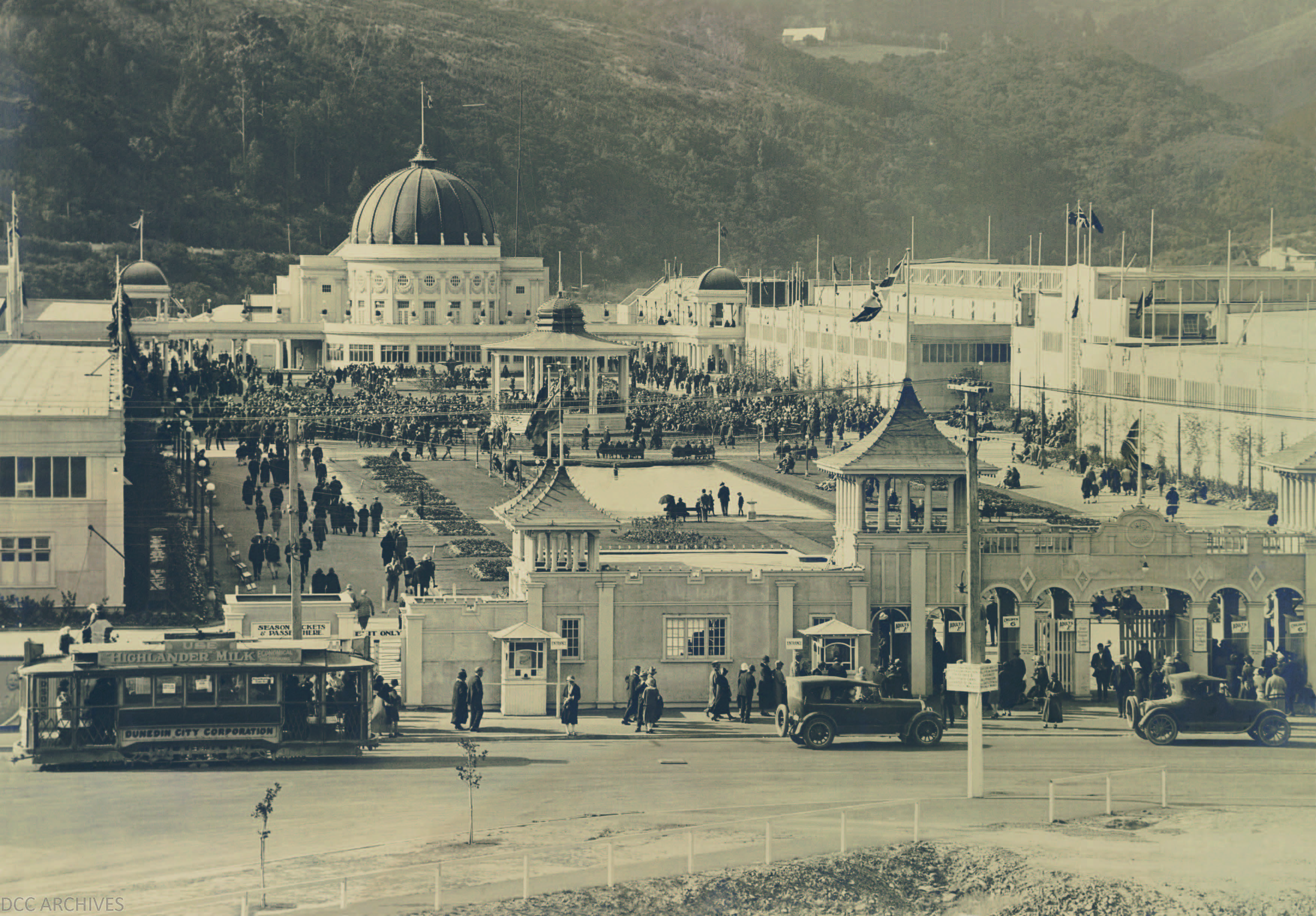
2nd South Seas Exhibition

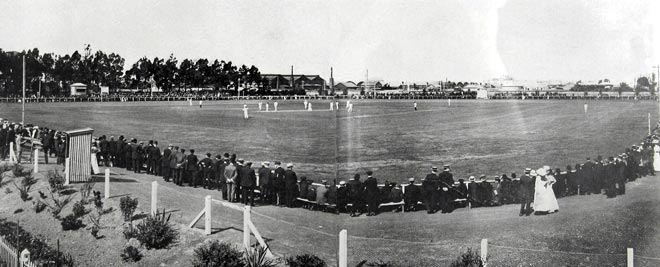
Carisbrook 1910

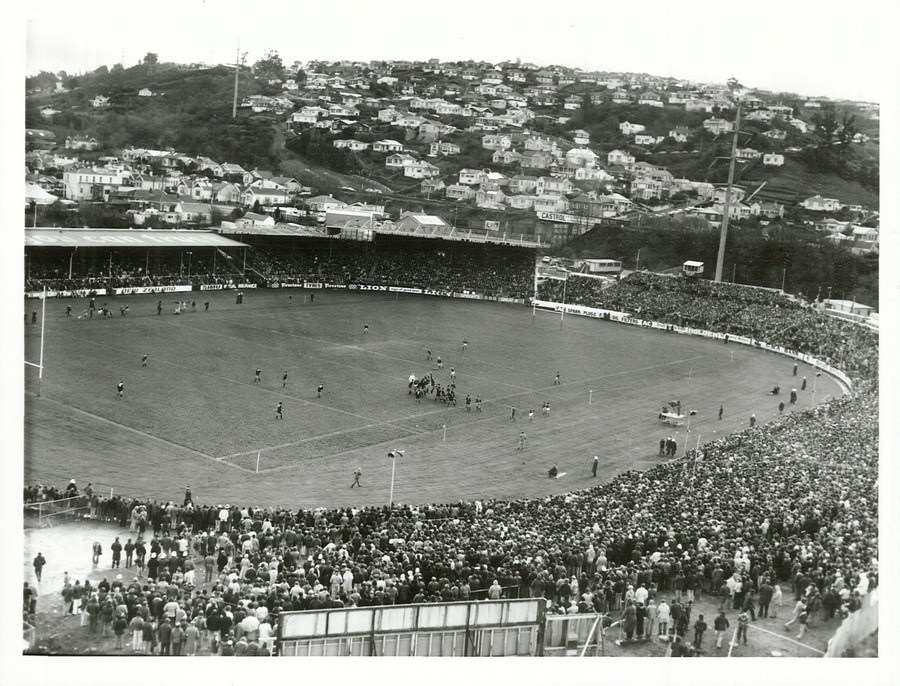
Carisbrook Park 1977

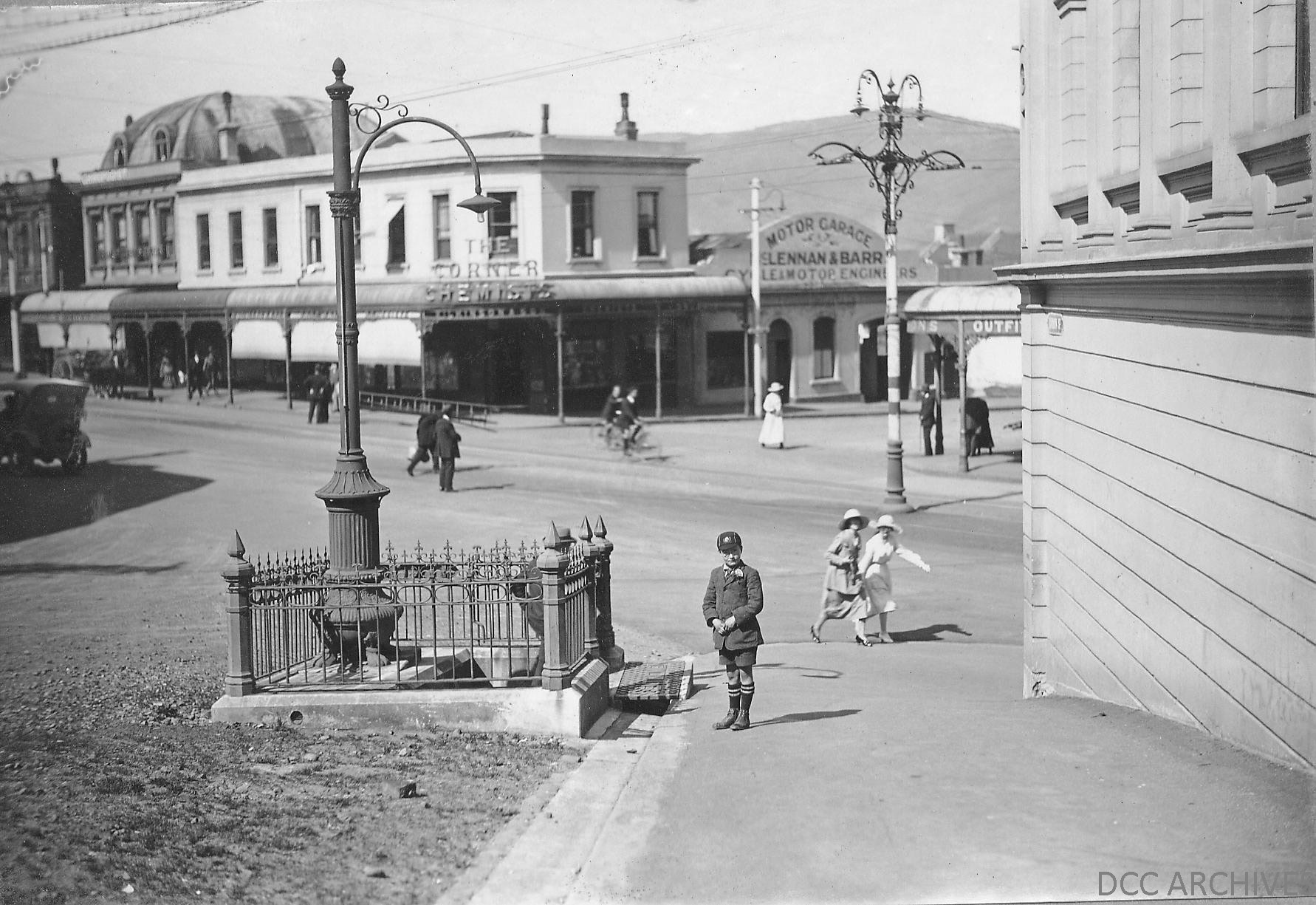
London Street Comfort Station 1919

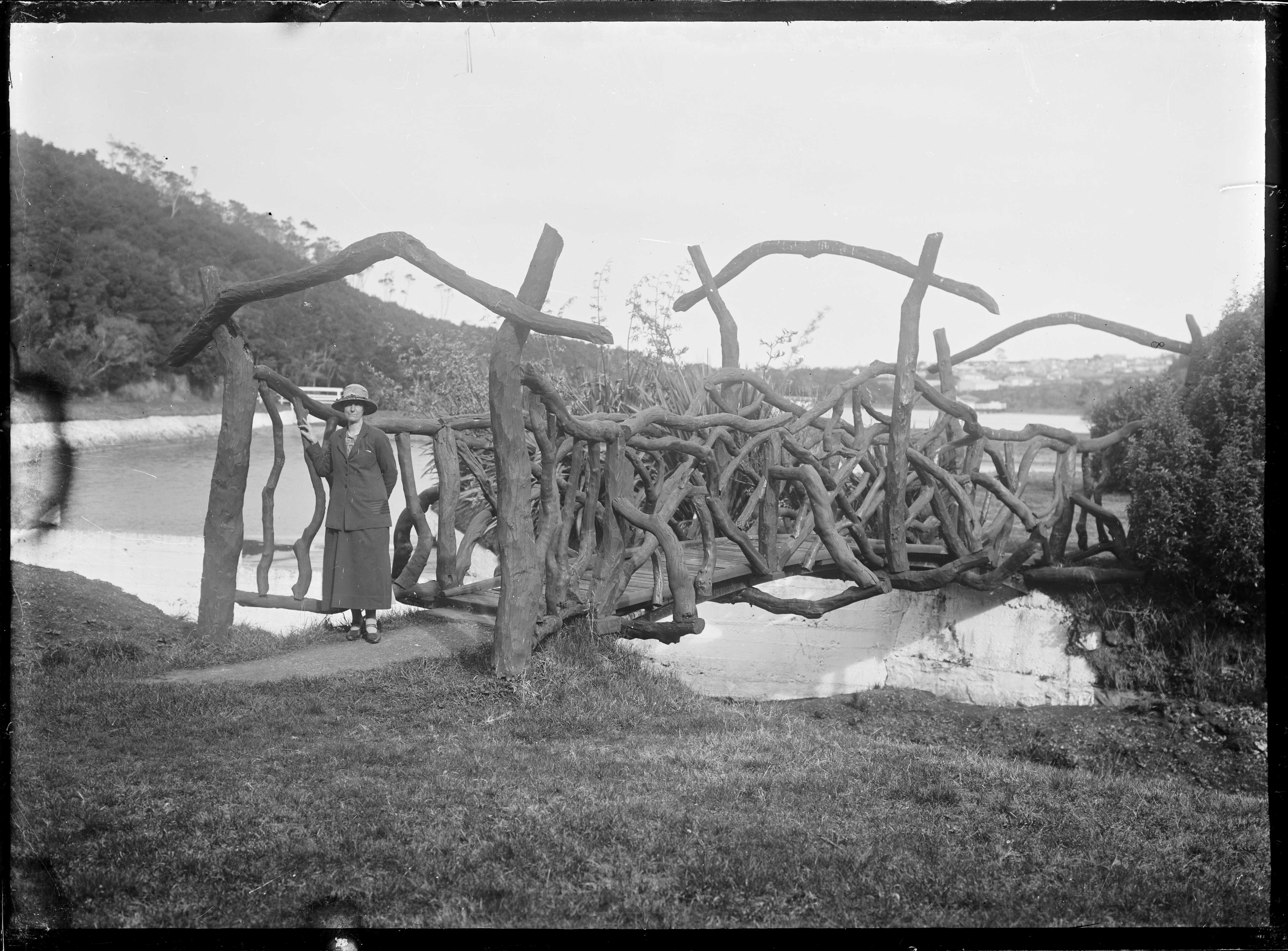
Rustic bridge at Ross Reservoir 1925

== See also ==
- History of New Zealand
- History of Otago
- List of historic hotels in Otago
- List of historic places in Dunedin
