= Thomas Forrester (architect) =

New Zealand plasterer, draughtsman, architect and engineer

Thomas Forrester (16 May 1838 – 25 March 1907) was a New Zealand plasterer, draughtsman, architect and engineer. He was born in Glasgow, Lanarkshire, Scotland on 16 May 1838. In 1865, he was the building superintendent at the New Zealand Exhibition in Dunedin.
