= New Zealand Industrial Exhibition (1885) =

Coordinates: 41.281°S 174.776°E

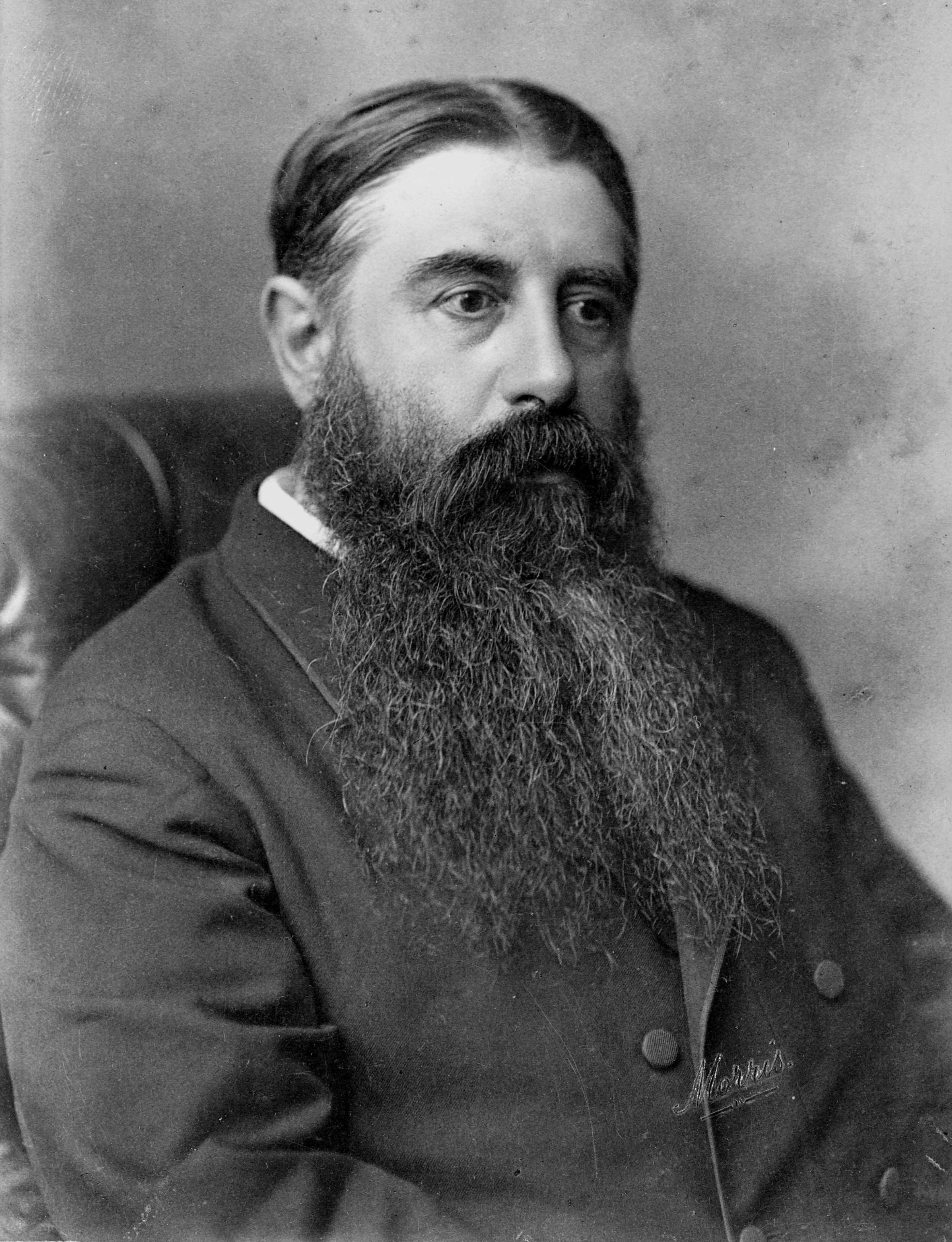
- Julius Vogel, organiser

Overview
- BIE-class: Unrecognized exposition
- Name: New Zealand Industrial Exhibition
- Area: 83,425 sq. feet
- Visitors: 132,787

Location
- Country: Colony of New Zealand
- City: Wellington
- Venue: Lambton Quay

Timeline
- Opening: 1 August 1885
- Closure: 31 October 1885

The New Zealand Industrial Exhibition was an industrial exhibition held in a large Industrial Exhibition Building in Wellington, between Lambton Quay and Stout Street in 1885. Organised by Julius Vogel it was intended to display New Zealand's industries to both encourage foreign investment and to boost New Zealand's self-confidence.

== Opening ==
The exhibition was opened by William Jervois, (Governor-General of New Zealand) on 1 August 1885, with the Mayors of Auckland (William Waddel), Christchurch (Charles Hulbert) and Wellington (George Fisher) in attendance.

== Buildings, exhibits and entertainment ==
As well as the main purpose built exhibition building exiting an existing drill hall was used as a concert hall with a borrowed organ from Jenkins of Christchurch.

And in St George's Hall refreshments were served on the ground floor, with its upper storey of St George's Hall being used for painting, drawing and photograph display. There was a water colour competition, which was won by John Gully with his Western Coast of Tasman Bay.

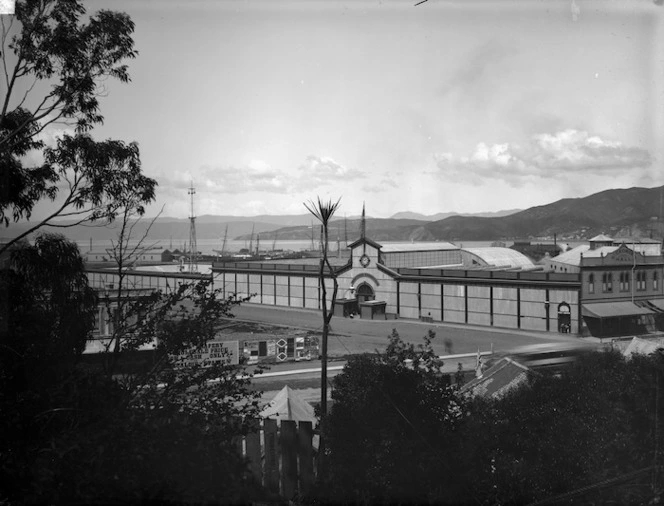
The building used for the 1885 industrial exhibition
