= New Zealand and South Seas Exhibition =

World fair held in Dunedin, New Zealand 1889–1890

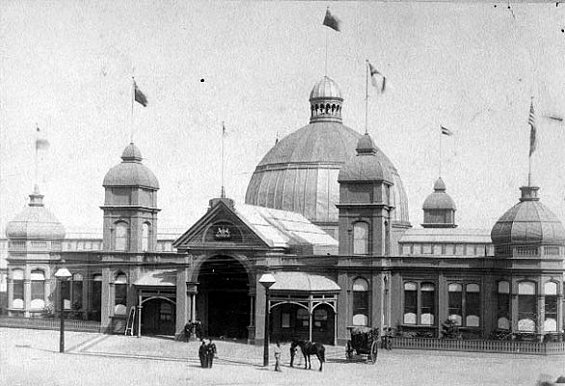
The main fair building of the exhibition, Dunedin

The New Zealand and South Seas Exhibition was an international exhibition held in Dunedin, New Zealand from 26 November 1889 to 19 April 1890. A previous exhibition had been held in 1865, the first world's fair in New Zealand, and a later exhibition opened in 1925.

== Organization ==
D. H. Hasting proposed the hosting of an international exhibition in Dunedin, New Zealand, to celebrate the golden jubilee in 1890 of the proclamation of British sovereignty over New Zealand in 1840. A meeting was held on 25 October 1888 to form an organizing committee. John Roberts was elected president and Richard Twopeny, executive commissioner. Alfred Lee Smith was one of the directors of the exhibition. The national government officially recognized the New Zealand and South Seas Exhibition, and granted £10,000 for its organization.

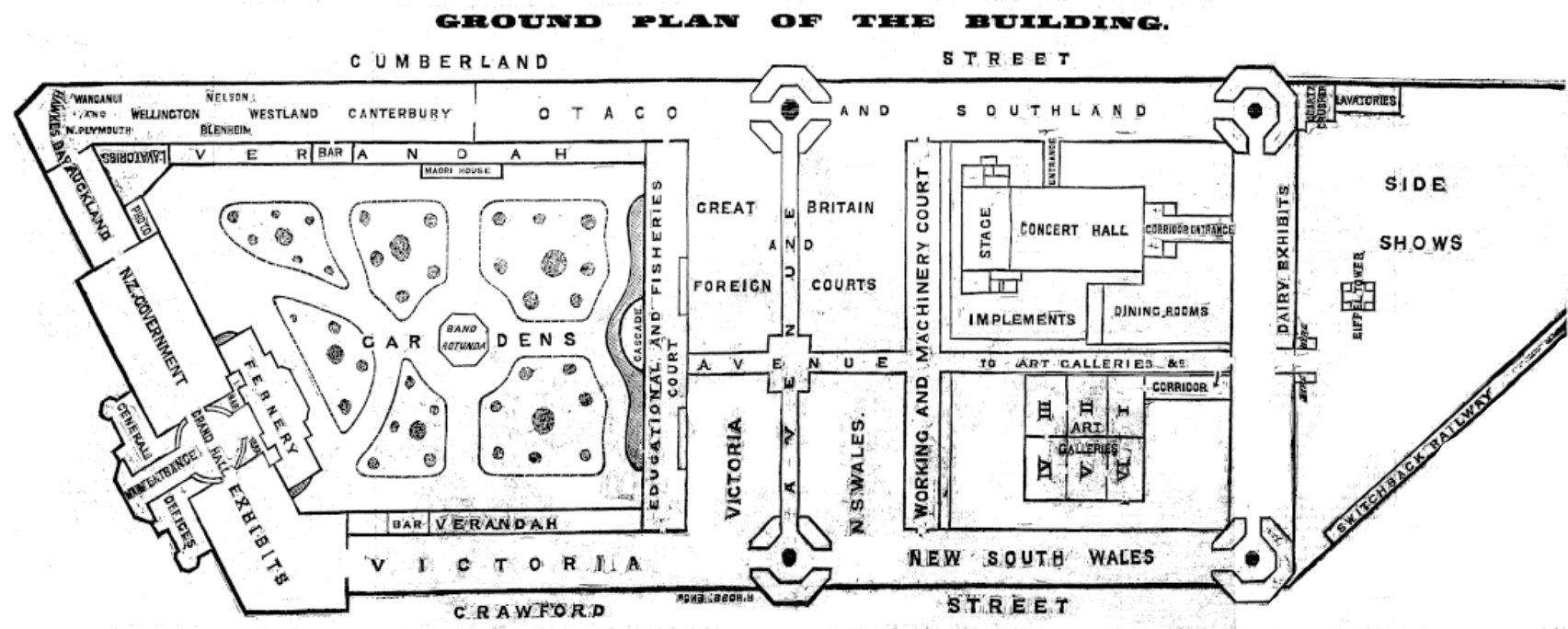
Plan of the various exhibition areas

== Architecture ==
A site of about 121 acres was donated by the Otago Harbour Board, bounded by Crawford, Anderson's Bay, Cumberland, and Jervois Streets. The main building was designed by James Hislop and built by contractors McMath and Walker of Invercargill. The building consisted of several annexes and halls forming an irregular quadrilateral with its longest side measuring 1,162 feet and a total width of 465 feet. A huge dome 50 feet in diameter rose 80 feet above the main entrance and was covered in eight tons of lead.

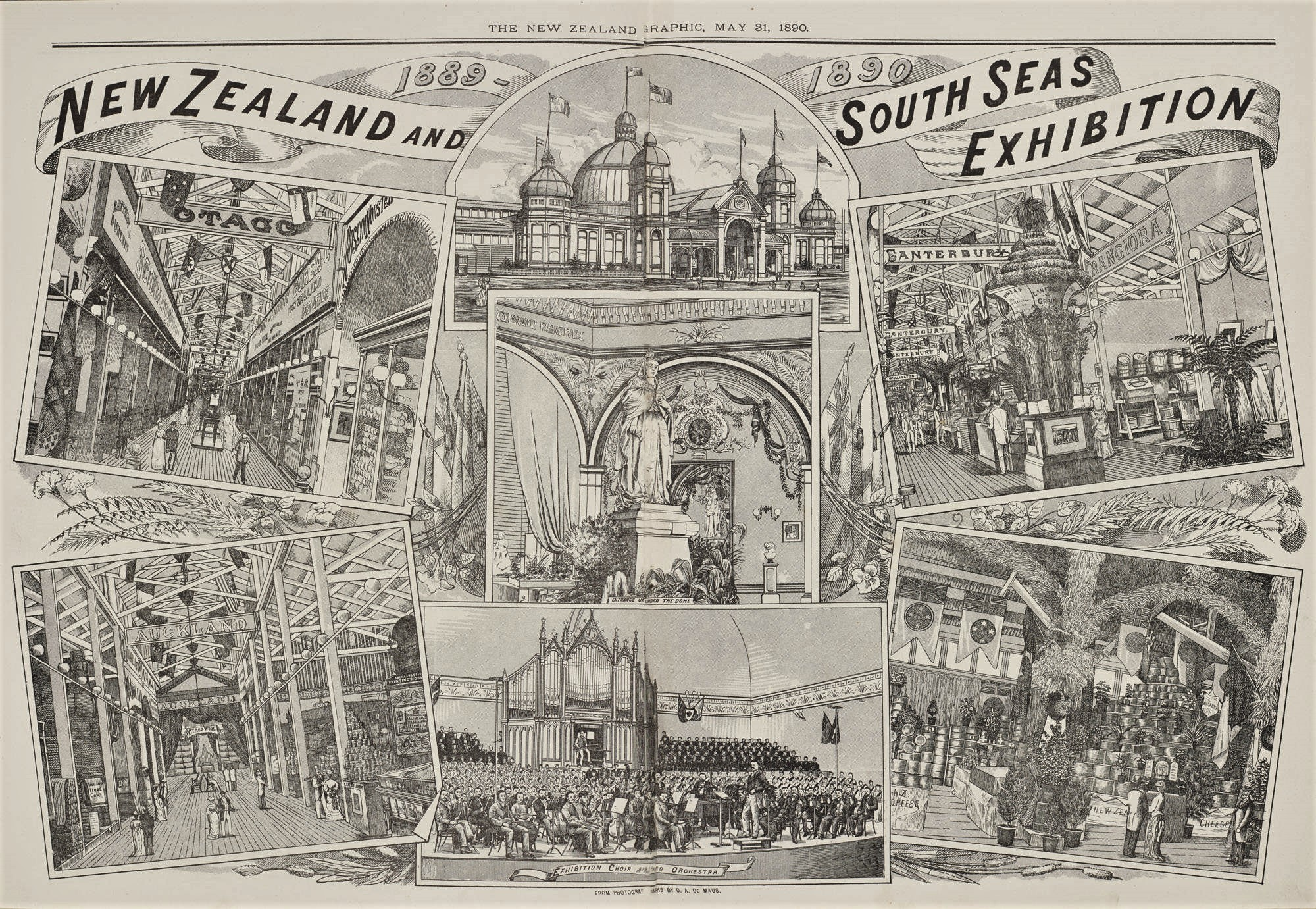
Interior views of the exhibition halls

The main building was described as being of Moorish design. Inside, there were large arches draped with velvet curtains and bordered by wooden spandrels decorated with New Zealand ferns and flowers, mirrors and baskets of flowers, and a multi-coloured decorated ceiling. Friezes above the arches were decorated with inspiring mottoes on gold backgrounds: Fax mentis incendium gloriæ (Glory is the torch of the mind); Forti omne solum patria (The man of courage makes every land his home); Virtutem sequitur gloria (Merit wins credit); and Labor omnia vincit improbus (Incessant toil conquers all). A statue of Queen Victoria stood on a pedestal directly under the dome.

== The exhibition ==
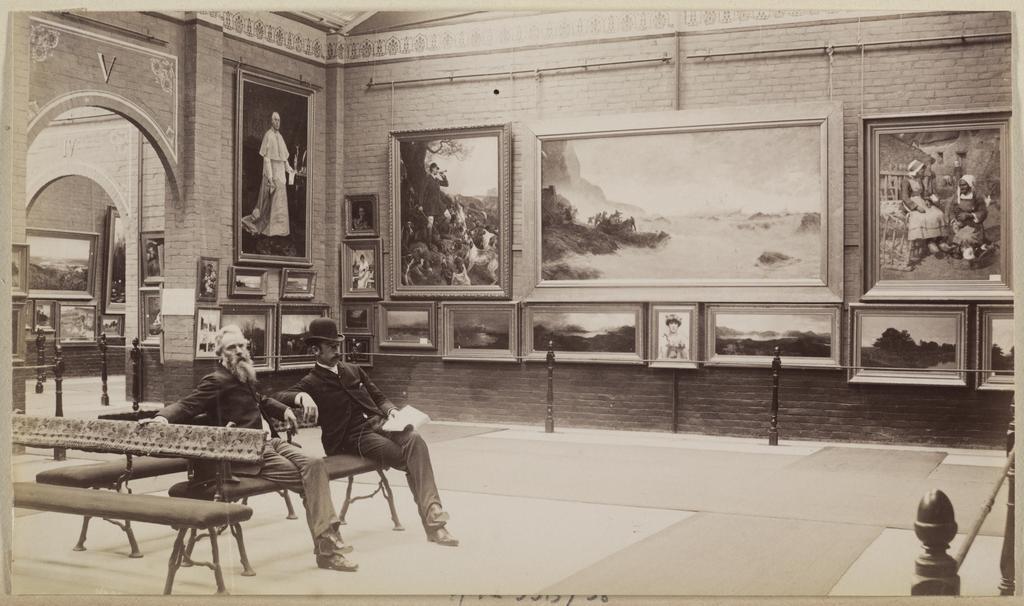
David Con Hutton and an unnamed visitor in one of the art exhibition halls

The exhibition was opened on 26 November 1889 by Governor Lord Onslow. The fair celebrated industry and products from New Zealand and overseas. Places represented included Mauritius, Canada, Costa Rica, United States, Ceylon, Japan, Syria, Austria, Belgium, France, Germany, Great Britain, Italy, Cook Islands, Fiji, Hawaii, New Guinea, New Hebrides, New South Wales, New Zealand, Queensland, Samoa, Solomon Islands, South Australia, Tonga, Victoria, and Western Australia.

Exhibitions included New Zealand's Eiffel Tower, a 40-metre-high (130 ft) wooden structure built by the Austral Otis Elevator Company, based on the newly-erected Eiffel Tower in Paris. The tower was estimated to cost £1200. An elevator ascended about 30 m up the tower, and there were four landings where people could alight. The elevator could carry 16 people at a time, for a fee of sixpence per adult. A smaller Eiffel Tower about 12 m (40 ft) high, without an elevator, was situated in an adjacent garden area near the internal courtyard of the exhibition. It was used for displaying whisky. Another very popular attraction was the switchback railway, similar to a roller coaster, which swooped up and down inclines on a 122-metre long (400 ft ) track. At the 'Anthropometrical Laboratory', visitors could have tests such as lung capacity, eyesight, and strength and have their body measurements analysed.

There was an attendance of 625,248 during the 125 days the exhibition was open, before it closed on 19 April 1890. The exhibition made a profit of almost £900, which was distributed amongst the shareholders of the organising body, the New Zealand Exhibition Company.

After the exhibition closed, the various buildings and fittings were sold off or demolished and the site was cleared. One of the last existing sections of the exhibition was an octagonal tower, made of timber and corrugated iron, which was sold and removed to a farm at Kuri Bush near Dunedin. It was used for many years as housing for cows and chickens and as a hay barn, gradually becoming more decayed. The structure collapsed in strong winds in November 2015.

John Roberts was awarded the Companionship of the Most Distinguished Order of St. Michael and St. George in 1891 for his services as president of the exhibition.

A book was published on the occasion of the exhibition, titled Picturesque Dunedin. It was edited by Alexander Bathgate, and gave a description of Dunedin and its neighbourhood, with a short historical account of the city and its principal institutions.
