= New Zealand Exhibition =

World fair in Dunedin, New Zealand, 1865

1865 Dunedin
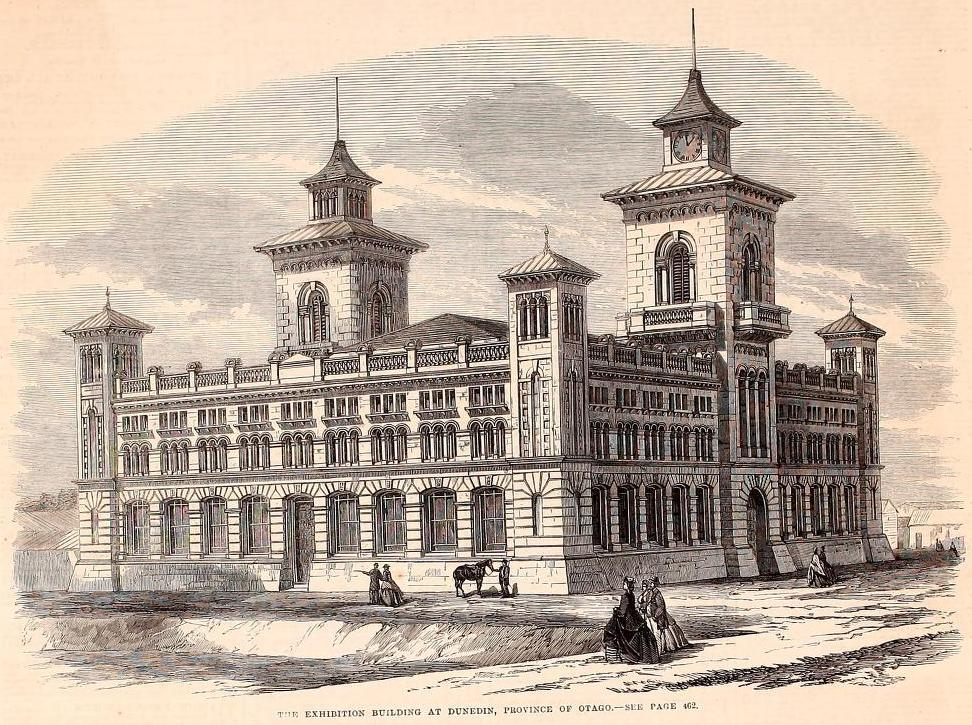
- New Zealand Exhibition Building, Dunedin, 1865

Overview
- BIE-class: Unrecognized exposition
- Name: New Zealand Exhibition
- Visitors: 31250
- Organized by: John Hyde Harris, James Hector, Alfred Eccles and Thomas Forrester

Participant(s)
- Countries: 12

Location
- Country: Colony of New Zealand
- City: Dunedin
- Coordinates: 45°52′9.84″S 170°30′30.96″E

Timeline
- Opening: 12 January 1865
- Closure: 6 May 1865

The New Zealand Exhibition, which took place in Dunedin, New Zealand, in 1865, was a world's fair visited by approximately 31250 people. It was the first world's fair held in New Zealand. It opened on 12 January and ran until 6 May 1865. Later world's fairs opened in Dunedin in 1889 and 1925.

== Organisation ==
Following the Bazaar and Industrial Exhibition held in Dunedin in 1862, a group of men formed a committee for the promotion of a similar exhibition to be held on a larger scale in Dunedin in 1865. An application was made in February 1863 to the Governor requesting the formation of a Royal Commission, which was granted in May. The Provincial Government provided the sum of £4,000 for general purposes and another £4,000 to build a suitable building. John Hyde Harris was president of the executive, James Hector was commissioner and juror, Alfred Eccles was the secretary and Thomas Forrester was the building superintendent.

== Architecture ==
A low-level site on King Street was secured and a contract to erect the main building was let to George Cornwell and Edward Horsman on 11 November 1863, for £10,250. There was a large two-storey stone Italianate building with clock tower and a series of annexes all designed by Mason and Clayton, with a central courtyard derived from Fowler's design of Covent Garden market. It was not completely finished when the fair opened.

== International participation ==
From the Americas came exhibits from Canada and the United States. European exhibits came from Austria, Belgium, France, Germany, Great Britain, and the Netherlands. The sole Asian exhibiting nation was India. From Oceania, the colony of New Zealand was well represented, as were New South Wales, Queensland, South Australia, Tasmania, and Victoria. Altogether there were 1,598 exhibits from about 700 exhibitors.

== Legacy ==
Exhibits from the exhibition provided the opening collection of the Colonial Museum in Wellington, and added to the collection at the Otago Museum. The main building was converted into a new hospital for Dunedin. The old annex at the rear of the building was torn down in the mid-1890s, and a fire in the tower in 1897 almost destroyed the entire building. The main building-turned-hospital was demolished in 1933.

After the exhibition, the collections were put into storage and the art works were included in the formation of the Otago Society of Arts in 1876.
