= Central Dunedin =

- Suburb
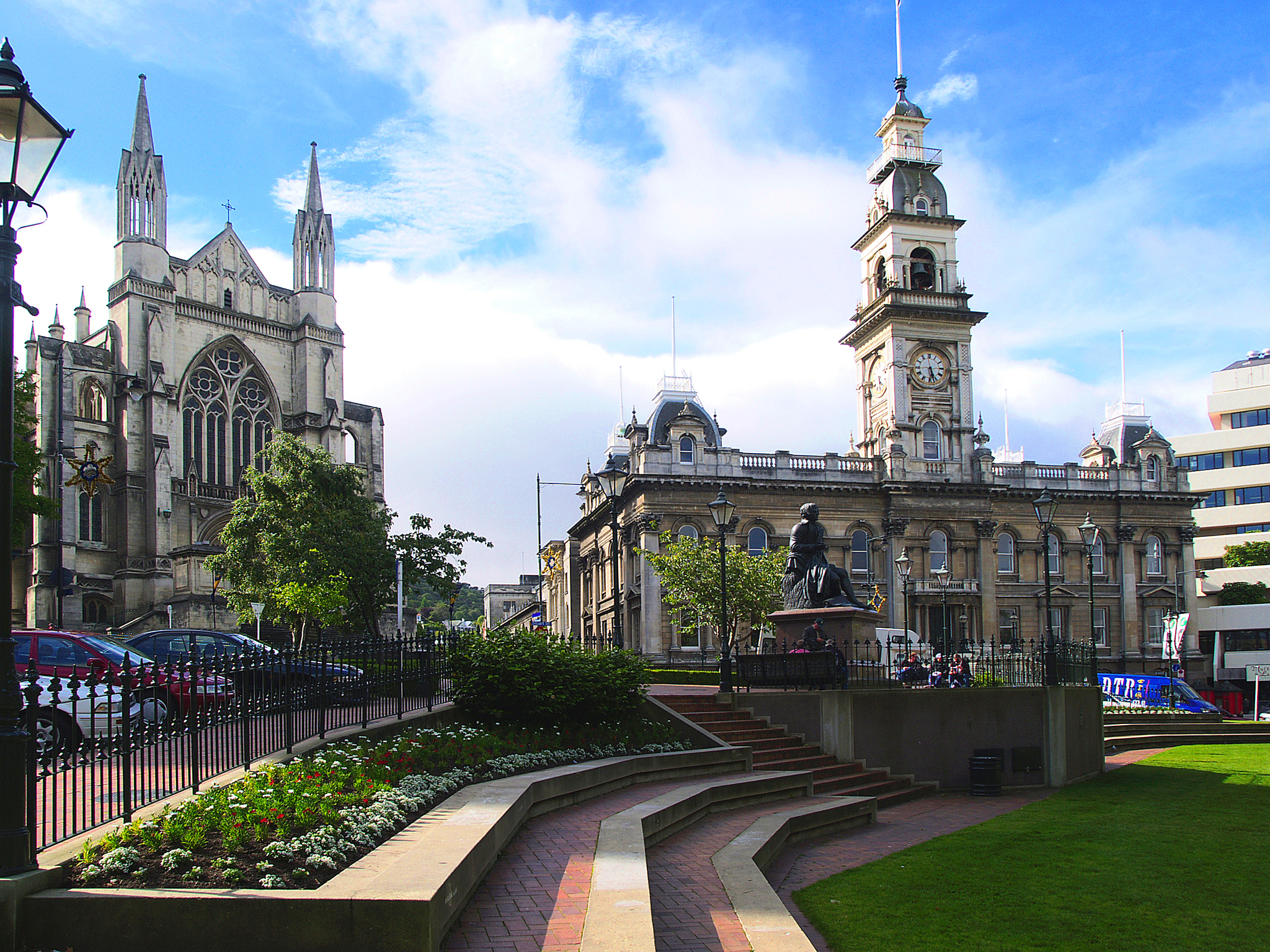
- St. Paul's Anglican Cathedral, Dunedin Municipal Chambers, and the Civic Centre in the Octagon
- Interactive map of Central Dunedin
- Coordinates: 45°52′27″S 170°30′13″E
- Country: New Zealand
- City: Dunedin
- Local authority: Dunedin City Council

Area
  - Land: 131 ha (320 acres)

Population (June 2025)
  - Total: 2,400
  - Density: 1,800/km^{2} (4,700/sq mi)

	Dunedin North
City Rise	Central Dunedin	Dunedin Harbourside
Kensington	South Dunedin

Map of Central Dunedin. 1 = George Street; 2 = The Octagon; 3 = Moray Place; 4 = Princes Street; 5 = Upper Stuart Street; 6 = Lower Stuart Street.

Central Dunedin is the central suburb and business district of the New Zealand city of Dunedin.

== Geography ==
Dunedin was founded by Scottish pioneers in 1848; as a result, many of the city's streets are named for equivalent streets in Edinburgh.

Central Dunedin is centred around The Octagon, a central reserve ringed by a street of the same name on which lie several of the city's main buildings, among them the Dunedin Municipal Chambers, Dunedin Public Art Gallery, St. Paul's Anglican Cathedral, and the city's main live theatre, the "Regent Theatre". Around this hub is a larger octagonal road, Moray Place, Dunedin. The city's main commercial streets, George Street and Princes Street stretch to the north and west respectively from the Octagon.

Another main arterial road, Stuart Street runs at right angles to these roads, with Upper Stuart Street stretching up to the city's hill suburbs in the west, and Lower Stuart Street running east to the city's historic railway station. Beyond this lie the city's inner docks and the waters of Otago Harbour.

Other major roads within the central city include Great King Street and Filleul Street which run parallel to George Street, and Crawford Street, which runs parallel to Princes Street. Other major roads running parallel to these streets include Castle Street and Cumberland Street. Parts of Castle, Cumberland, and Crawford Streets are part of State Highway 1 (New Zealand). Other streets crossing these include St Andrews Street and Frederick Street. The eastern end of St Andrews Street forms the beginning of SH 88. Between this and Moray Place, on Great King Street, is the city's bus hub, from which buses travel to the city's suburbs.

In March 2018, Barnes Dance crossings were introduced at the Octagon's southern and northern junctions (with Princes Street and George Street). They became the city's first Barnes Dance crossing for over 20 years (the last previously being at Cargill's Corner in South Dunedin), and the pilot for a scheme which saw several more such crossings put in place by the end of the year, including others at the junctions of Moray Place with George Street, Princes Street, and Lower Stuart Street.

A park, Queen's Gardens, marks an approximate southern end of the central city. This triangular area includes the city's main war memorial and is bordered by one of the city's main museums, Toitū Otago Settlers Museum, and Dunedin Chinese Garden. Beyond this lie the inner city precincts of The Exchange and the Warehouse Precinct.

== History ==
Early Dunedin was centred on two distinct sites, one to the north of the Octagon, and another in The Exchange, around lower Princes Street. Between these two areas lay a large rock outcrop, Bell Hill and a low-lying swampy area which was later to be the site of the Octagon. The removal of the top of Bell Hill to allow for a thoroughfare between the two settlements was one of the young colony's biggest engineering feats (much of the rubble from Bell Hill would be used to reclaim areas of the upper harbour which became known as the Southern Endowment.

The discovery of gold inland from Dunedin in 1861 led to the Otago gold rush, and made Dunedin the colony's richest city. As a result of the influx of money, the city grew rapidly, and the wealth allowed commercial enterprises and private citizens to build big. As a result, Dunedin has many of New Zealand's finest Victorian-era buildings, especially down Princes Street, which was the city's first central business district. By the mid-20th century, business had drifted further north, and today the area around George Street is the city's commercial hub.

== Demographics ==
The Dunedin Central statistical area covers 1.31 km^{2} (0.51 sq mi) and had an estimated population of 2,400 as of June 2025, with a population density of 1,832 people per km^{2}.

Historical population
Year	Pop.	±% p.a.
2006	1,902	—
2013	1,914	+0.09%
2018	1,962	+0.50%

Dunedin Central had a population of 1,962 at the 2018 New Zealand census, an increase of 48 people (2.5%) since the 2013 census, and an increase of 60 people (3.2%) since the 2006 census. There were 678 households, comprising 1,068 males and 897 females, giving a sex ratio of 1.19 males per female. The median age was 24.7 years (compared with 37.4 years nationally), with 60 people (3.1%) aged under 15 years, 1,251 (63.8%) aged 15 to 29, 594 (30.3%) aged 30 to 64, and 60 (3.1%) aged 65 or older.

Ethnicities were 70.2% European/Pākehā, 8.7% Māori, 3.2% Pasifika, 24.5% Asian, and 4.1% other ethnicities. People may identify with more than one ethnicity.

The percentage of people born overseas was 37.2, compared with 27.1% nationally.

Although some people chose not to answer the census's question about religious affiliation, 56.4% had no religion, 25.8% were Christian, 0.2% had Māori religious beliefs, 2.9% were Hindu, 3.2% were Muslim, 1.8% were Buddhist and 4.9% had other religions.

Of those at least 15 years old, 648 (34.1%) people had a bachelor's or higher degree, and 102 (5.4%) people had no formal qualifications. The median income was $17,400, compared with $31,800 nationally. 144 people (7.6%) earned over $70,000 compared to 17.2% nationally. The employment status of those at least 15 was that 765 (40.2%) people were employed full-time, 408 (21.5%) were part-time, and 141 (7.4%) were unemployed.
