= Bank of New Zealand Building =

Bank of New Zealand Building may refer to the following buildings in New Zealand:

- Bank of New Zealand Building, Akaroa
- Bank of New Zealand Building, Queen Street, Auckland
- Bank of New Zealand Building, Princes Street, Dunedin
- Former Bank of New Zealand Building, Hamilton
- Bank of New Zealand Te Aro branch building, Cuba and Manners Streets, Wellington
- Former National Bank of New Zealand Building, Cuba and Vivian Streets, Wellington
- Old Bank Arcade, Lambton Quay, Wellington

Bank of New Zealand Building may also refer to the company's former British headquarters at 1 Queen Victoria Street, London
