= Warehouse Precinct =

Dunedin suburb

Coordinates: 45°52′45″S 170°30′10″E

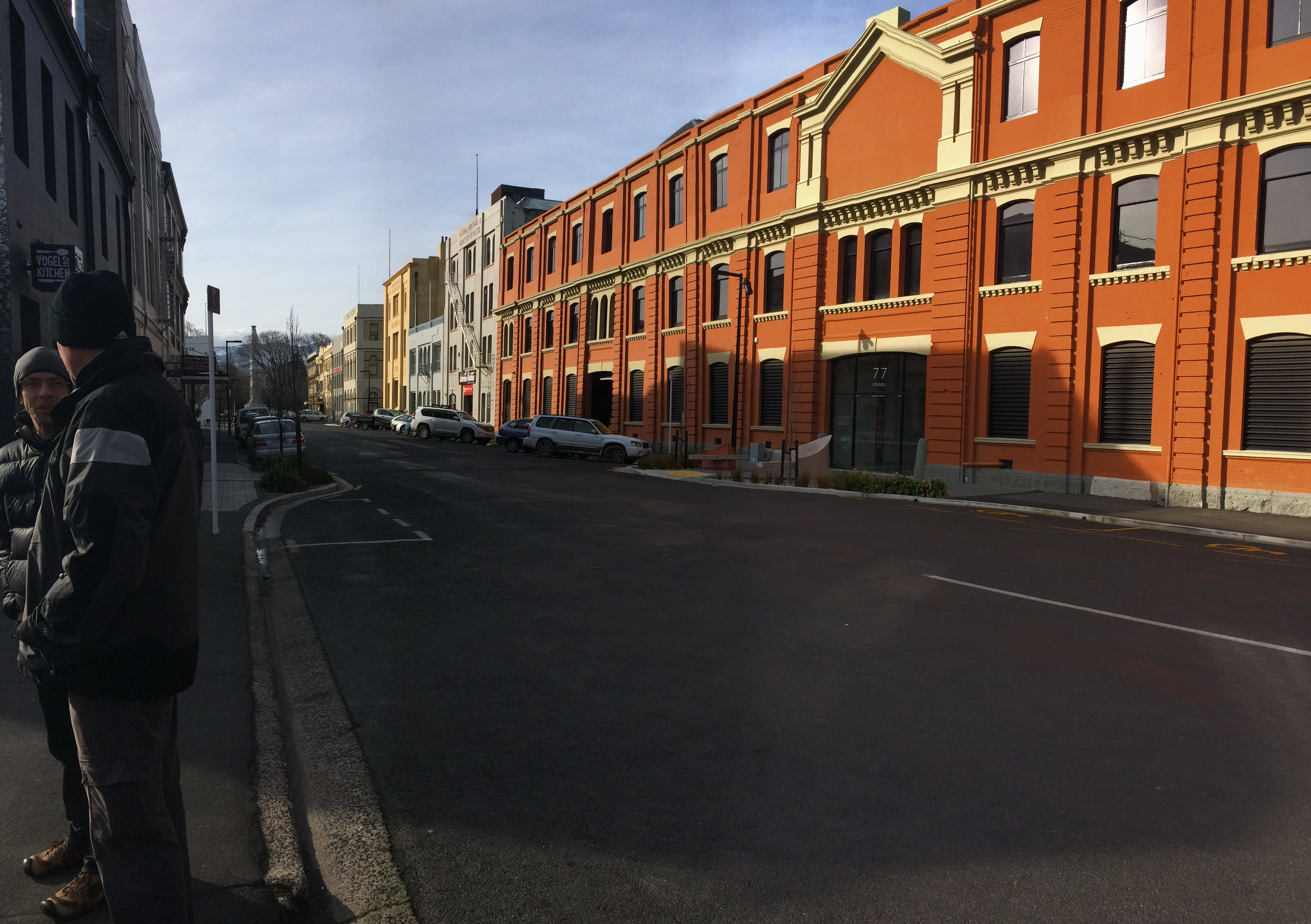
Vogel Street

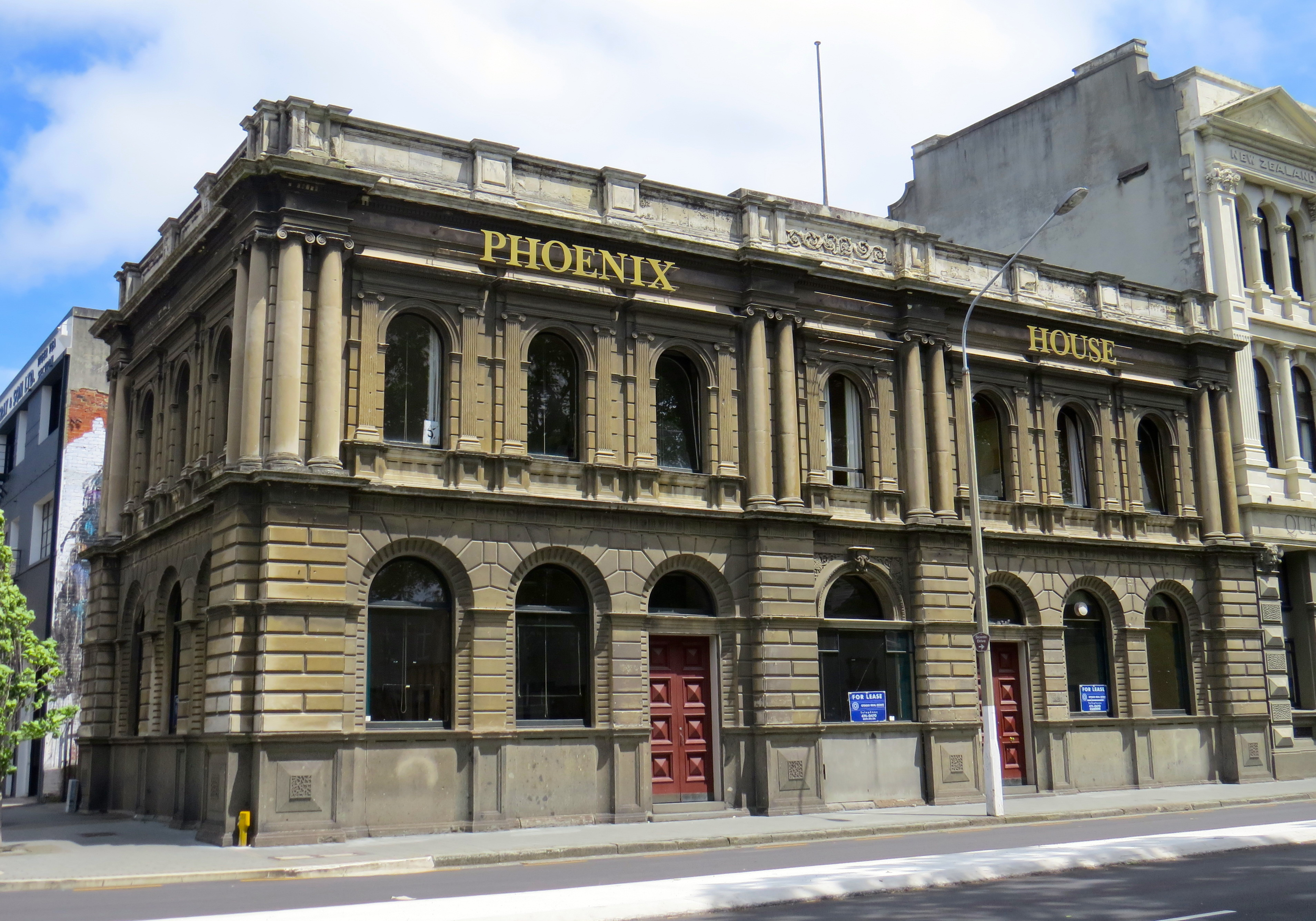
Phoenix House, in Queens Gardens, marks the northern end of the Warehouse Precinct.

The Warehouse Precinct is an urban area of the New Zealand city of Dunedin. Sited on reclaimed land at the northernmost tip of the Southern Endowment, it lies between 1 and 2 kilometres south of The Octagon, the city's centre.

== Location ==
The Warehouse Precinct stretches along and between the northbound and southbound streets which make up State Highway 1 in the south part of the city's CBD, Crawford Street and Cumberland Street, and west to Princes Street at The Exchange. The northern limit of the area is marked by the central city park, Queens Gardens, which is the site of the city's main cenotaph. No defined southern boundary exists for the precinct, though most of the current beautification schemes stretch as far as Police Street, 600 metres south of Queens Gardens. Streets within the precinct include (parallel with Princes Street, westernmost to easternmost) Bond, Crawford, Vogel, and Cumberland Streets, and (crossing at right angles, northernmost to southernmost) Rattray, Liverpool, Jetty, and Police Streets.

Buildings within the Warehouse Precinct are of a variety of ages and styles, but many of them date from the late Victorian and Edwardian periods, with several of them showing the influence of Classical revival and Chicago school architecture. A few of the more historic buildings were designed by notable local architect R. A. Lawson.

== History ==
As its name implies, the precinct was the historic heart of the city's wholesale trade, and was located close to the city's docks. With land reclamation, it is now some distance inland from the Dunedin wharves. Many of the city's older and more imposing buildings are located in the area, a large number of them built during and immediately after the Otago gold rush of the 1860s. Of newer structures, the most prominent is the Jetty Street overbridge, which crosses Vogel and Cumberland Streets and the South Island Main Trunk Railway, linking the state highway with Dunedin's wharves and major routes along the edge of Otago Harbour. The area of Vogel and Jetty Streets immediately around the overbridge was pedestrianised in 2017, with street sculpture, art, and furniture.

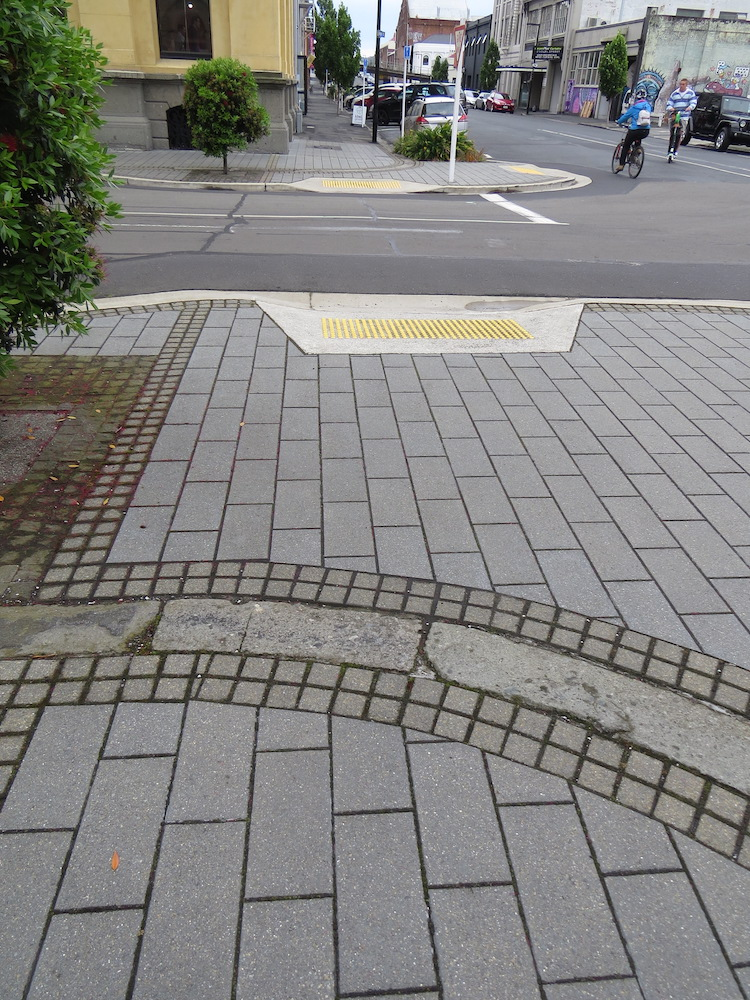
Historic bluestone kerbstones preserved within new street paving, Vogel Street

Central Dunedin. Queens Gardens is the triangular green area to the right of the 4. The smaller green area to the right of that is Dunedin Chinese Garden. Vogel Street, in the heart of the precinct, is the grey line leading south from Queens Gardens, between the two blue lines of State Highway 1. The Jetty Street overbridge can be seen at the centre bottom of the map.

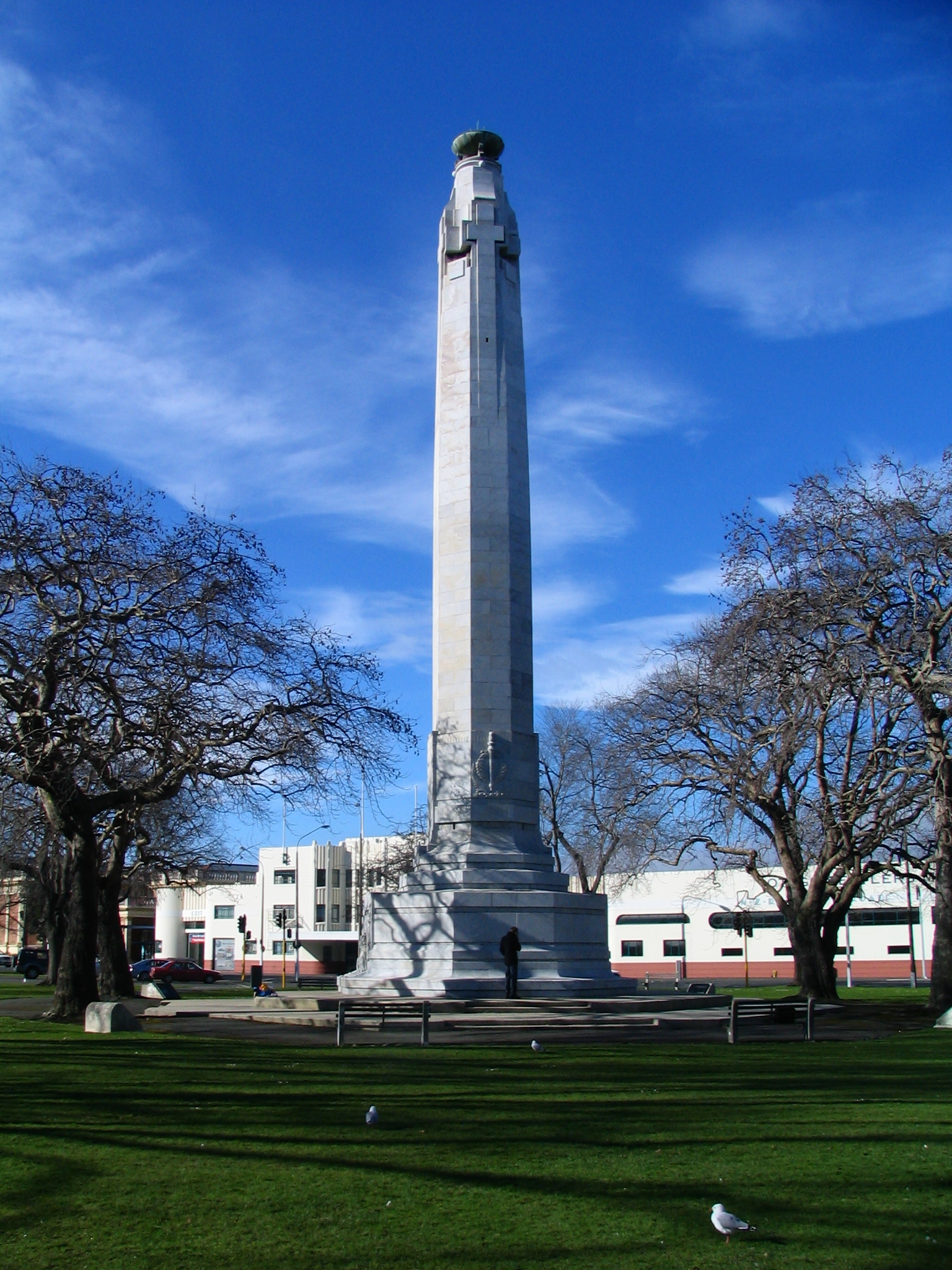
Dunedin Cenotaph in Queens Gardens, with Toitū Otago Settlers Museum in the background.

== Today ==
Several streets in the precinct have been beautified in the 21st century. The most thoroughly renovated of these streets is Vogel Street, which until the 1990s contained largely unused warehouses and commercial buildings. The street has been refurbished alongside an area between Water and Jetty streets and the blocks on either side. Tree planting and new street paving have been added, with the precinct's historic bluestone kerbstones being preserved.

Public sculpture has become a feature of the area, and both Vogel Street and Bond Street are also now home to a large number of urban murals by both local and overseas artists (among them Phlegm, Pixel Pancho, and Natalia Rak). Other murals can be found in nearby parts of The Exchange, particularly around Manse Street, Rattray Street, High Street, Jetty Street, and Stafford Street. Cafe culture and arts have thrived in the street as a result. The Dunedin City Council plans to renovate Bond Street, which runs parallel with Vogel Street, in a similar fashion.

The renovations and increase in social amenities in the precinct have seen increased interest from property developers and commercial businesses.

=== Vogel Street Party ===
An annual street festival, the Vogel Street Party, takes place on the street in October. The festival was inaugurated in 2014, and has taken place every year with the exception of 2018 and during the Covid-19 pandemic. The festival includes live music and performances, art displays, interactive programmes, and street vendors, and many of the street's renovated buildings have been open to the public to show off the changes that have been made to them. The festivals have also included other events, such as fashion shows and light displays.

Several of the years' Vogel Street Parties have featured specific themes. The 2015 party was subtitled "Literature and Light" to celebrate celebrating Dunedin’s new status as a UNESCO City of Literature and UNESCO’s International Year of Light. In 2016, the theme was "Connections", celebrating the links between Dunedin communities and the rest of the world. In 2017, the theme was "Ideas and incubation", with the focus on Dunedin's role as an 'incubator city', a city with a major emphasis on education and innovation. The theme for 2019 was "Dunedin Icons".

The festival now draws over 15,000 attendees annually from Dunedin and elsewhere around the country.

== Queens Gardens ==
Queens Gardens is a roughly triangular area of trees and lawn at the northern end of the Warehouse Precinct. It is bounded by several major roads, among them the two one-way streets which form part of SH 1, one of which cuts through the westernmost tip of the Gardens.

Several notable structures stand within the gardens: a Celtic Cross, symbolising the city's first European settlers and built in 2000 to mark the end of the second Christian millennium, stands at the northern end of the gardens. Statues to Queen Victoria and Donald M. Stuart, one of Dunedin's founding fathers, also stand in the gardens, as does the city's main war memorial, Dunedin Cenotaph, built between 1924 and 1927. The gardens are the scene of commemorations on ANZAC Day every April.

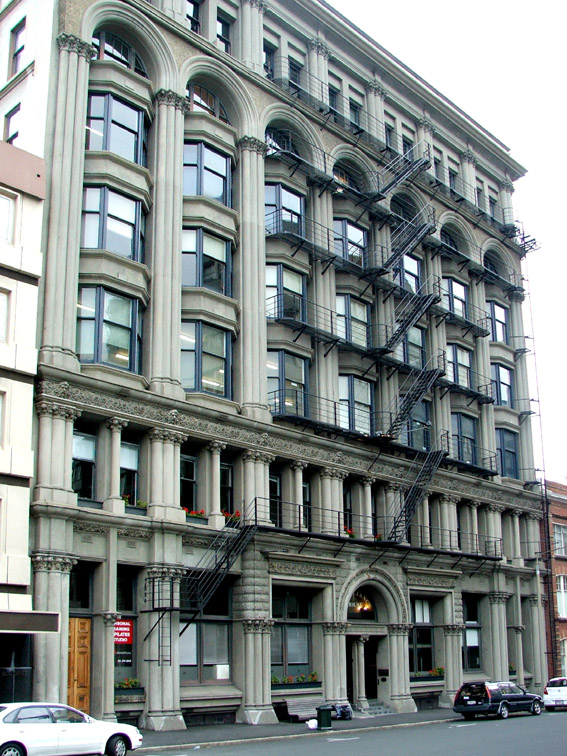
Consultancy House in The Exchange overlooks Queens Gardens and the northern end of the Warehouse Precinct.

== Notable buildings ==
Buildings within and adjacent to the Warehouse Precinct listed on the Heritage New Zealand register of historic places include the following:

- Consultancy House, Bond Street
- The former Union Steam Ship Company Offices, Vogel Street
- The Wood Adams Building, Bond Street
- The Moritzon Building, Bond Street
- The Guardian Royal Exchange Building, Liverpool Street
- Equitable Insurance Association Building (Phoenix House), Queens Gardens
- New Zealand Insurance Company Building, Queens Gardens

Other notable buildings include the Robert Lawson-designed Vogel House and Reid Wool Exchange, both in Vogel Street; former education board offices later used by A.H. and A.W. Reed, and the former Agricultural Hall (most recently Sammy's concert venue), both in Crawford Street; and the former Evening Star printing offices in Bond Street, designed by William Mason and built in 1881.

=== Overbridge ===
The Jetty Street Overbridge (also known as the Wharf Street Overbridge) crosses Vogel Street and the city's rail yards, linking Crawford Street with Wharf Street at the edge of Otago Harbour. From here it links with the city's inner wharves and with Portsmouth Drive, a major arterial route leading to Otago Harbour. At the time the bridge was built, in the late 1970s, the rail yards were far more extensive, but in the final years of the 20th century some of the tracks were removed and part of the land was subdivided for wholesale and retail premises.

The overbridge replaced an earlier bridge built by Kincaid McQueen & Co in the 1880s which was notable for being the first bridge to use New Zealand-produced steel, which had been produced at Smellie Brothers ironworks in Green Island. The bridge proved to be too narrow to comfortably take motorised traffic, and by the 1970s a replacement was a necessity. The old bridge was demolished in 1977. All that remains of it are the abutments, built from Port Chalmers bluestone in Vogel Street and Roberts Street. The Vogel Street abutment has been preserved as part of the Warehouse Precinct, along with the historic steps leading down to Crawford Street.
