= Queens Gardens, Dunedin =

Public park in Dunedin, New Zealand

Coordinates: 45°52′40″S 170°30′15″E

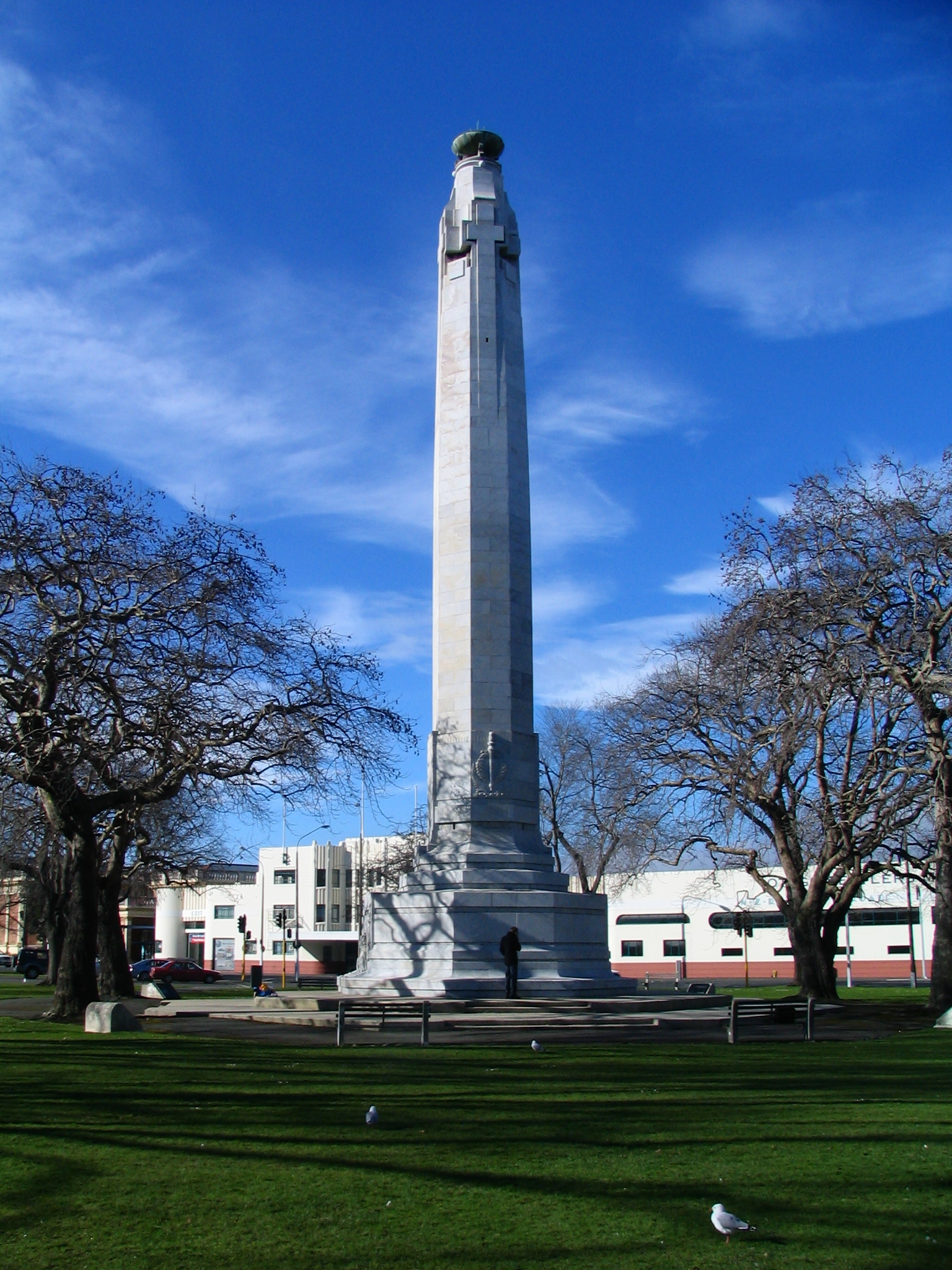
Dunedin Cenotaph in Queens Gardens, with Toitū Otago Settlers Museum in the background.

Central Dunedin. Queens Gardens is the triangular green area to the right of the 4.

Queens Gardens (also written as Queen's Gardens) is a roughly triangular area of trees and lawn in central Dunedin, New Zealand.

== Geography ==
The Gardens sit at the northern end of the Warehouse Precinct, and lie some 200 metres to the east of The Exchange, the city's former commercial hub on Princes Street. They are bounded by several major roads, among them the two one-way streets which form part of SH 1, one of which cuts through the westernmost tip of the Gardens. As such, the area around Queens Gardens includes some of the inner city's busiest traffic junctions.

Several notable structures stand within the gardens: a Celtic Cross, symbolising the city's first European settlers and built in 2000 to mark the end of the second Christian millennium, stands at the northern end of the gardens. Statues to Queen Victoria and Donald M. Stuart, one of Dunedin's founding fathers, also stand in the gardens. The gardens are dominated, however, by the city's main war memorial, the 28-metre (92 ft) tall eight-sided column of Dunedin Cenotaph, built between 1924 and 1927. A smaller memorial, listing New Zealand Victoria Cross recipients, stands next to the cenotaph. Several of the trees surrounding the perimeter of Queens Gardens were planted to remember various war anniversaries, and are accompanied by plaques commemorating these events, The gardens are the scene of commemorations on ANZAC Day every April.

== History and notable nearby buildings ==
Queens Gardens sit on reclaimed land very close to the original landing site for Māori waka. The area of harbour where Queens Gardens now sit was reclaimed in the final years of the 19th century. Originally called The Triangle, it was officially named Victoria Gardens in 1904 but soon became known as "The Queen's Gardens", from which its current name developed.

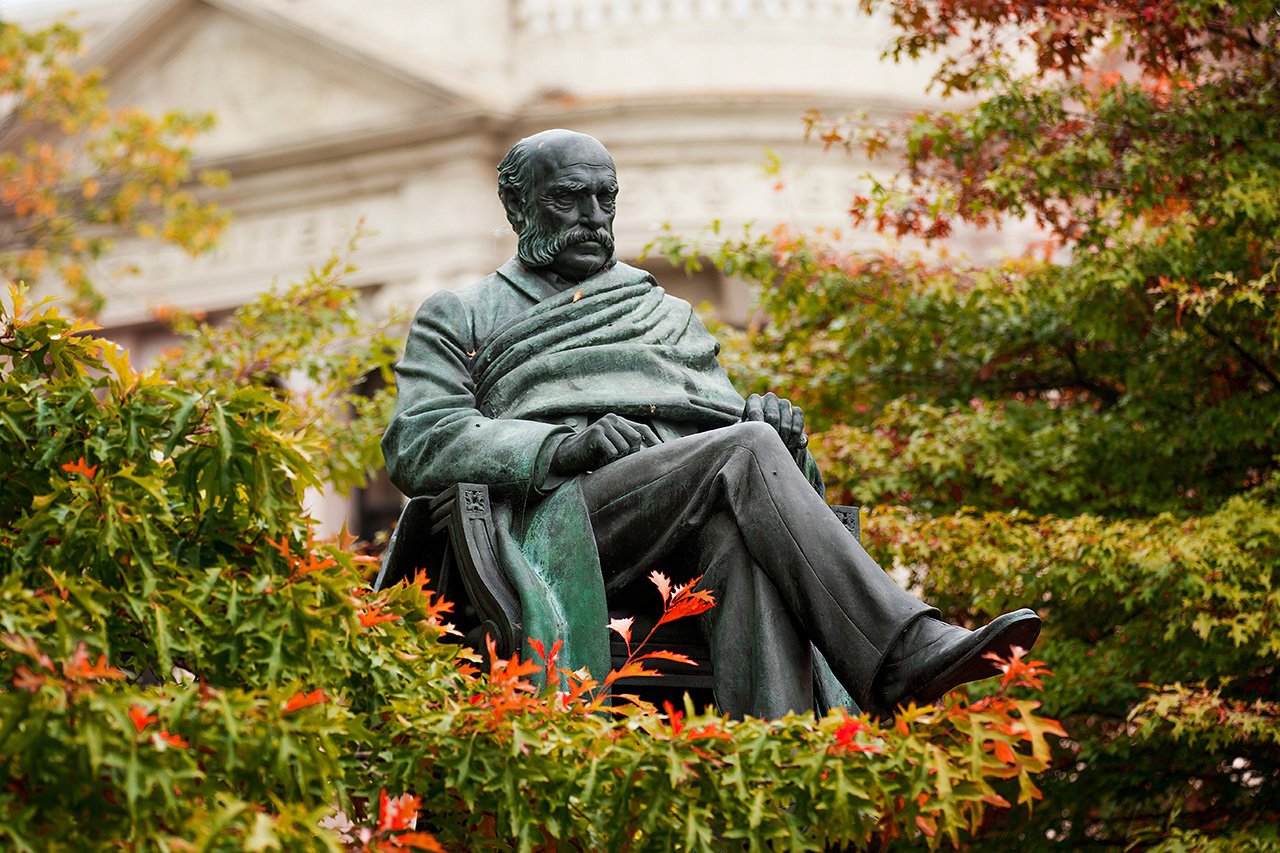
The Stuart Memorial is adjacent to the gardens.

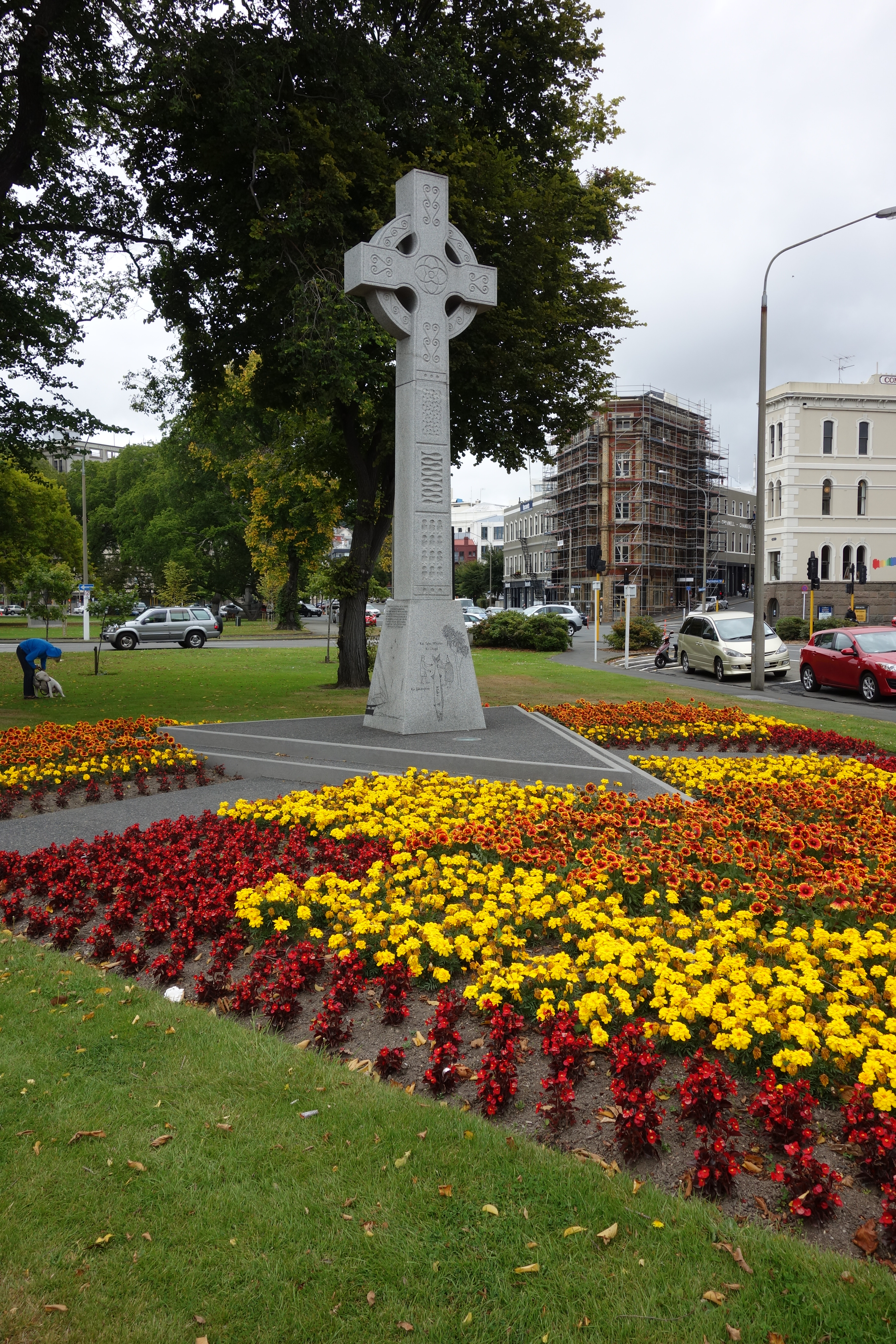
Dunedin's Millennium Cross stands at the northern end of the gardens. The scaffolded Imperial Building and cream-coloured Commercial Building are visible in the background at the foot of Dowling Street.

The shape of the park was altered in 1968 to accommodate changes to Dunedin's road network. This resulted in a through road separating the northernmost tip of the gardens from the rest. This much smaller triangular tip is now the site of a memorial Celtic cross to the city's first Scottish settlers, erected in 2000.

The gardens' location close to The Exchange means that it is surrounded by many notable buildings, many of them the legacy of the city's prosperity during the Central Otago gold rush of the 1860s. Several of the Exchange's historic buildings in that area (such as Consultancy House) overlook the gardens. The historic district of the Warehouse Precinct runs south from Queens Gardens, with its main street, Vogel Street, ending at the gardens' southern edge, and the historic precinct of Burlington Street runs north from Queens Gardens to Moray Place.

Several prominent landmarks surround Queens Gardens, most notably the former NZR Bus depot, at the gardens' eastern edge, which now forms the transport and technology wing of Toitū Otago Settlers Museum. Immediately to the south of this is the Dunedin Chinese Garden.

The First Church of Otago sits atop a rocky outcrop (the remains of Bell Hill) overlooking the northern end of the gardens. Further notable and historically listed buildings, such as the flatiron-like Imperial Building and nearby Commercial Building, are located nearby at the foot of Dowling Street, which forms part of the city's main arts district and contains numerous galleries and artists' studios.

Other historically recognised buildings within Queens Gardens include Phoenix House (the former Equitable Insurance Association Building) and the New Zealand Insurance Company Building, both of which are listed as historic buildings by Heritage New Zealand.

Dunedin's historic railway station, internationally regarded as a major architectural landmark stands within sight of the gardens some 350 metres to the northeast.
