= Dunedin Cenotaph =

War memorial in Dunedin

Coordinates: 45.8776°S 170.5044°E

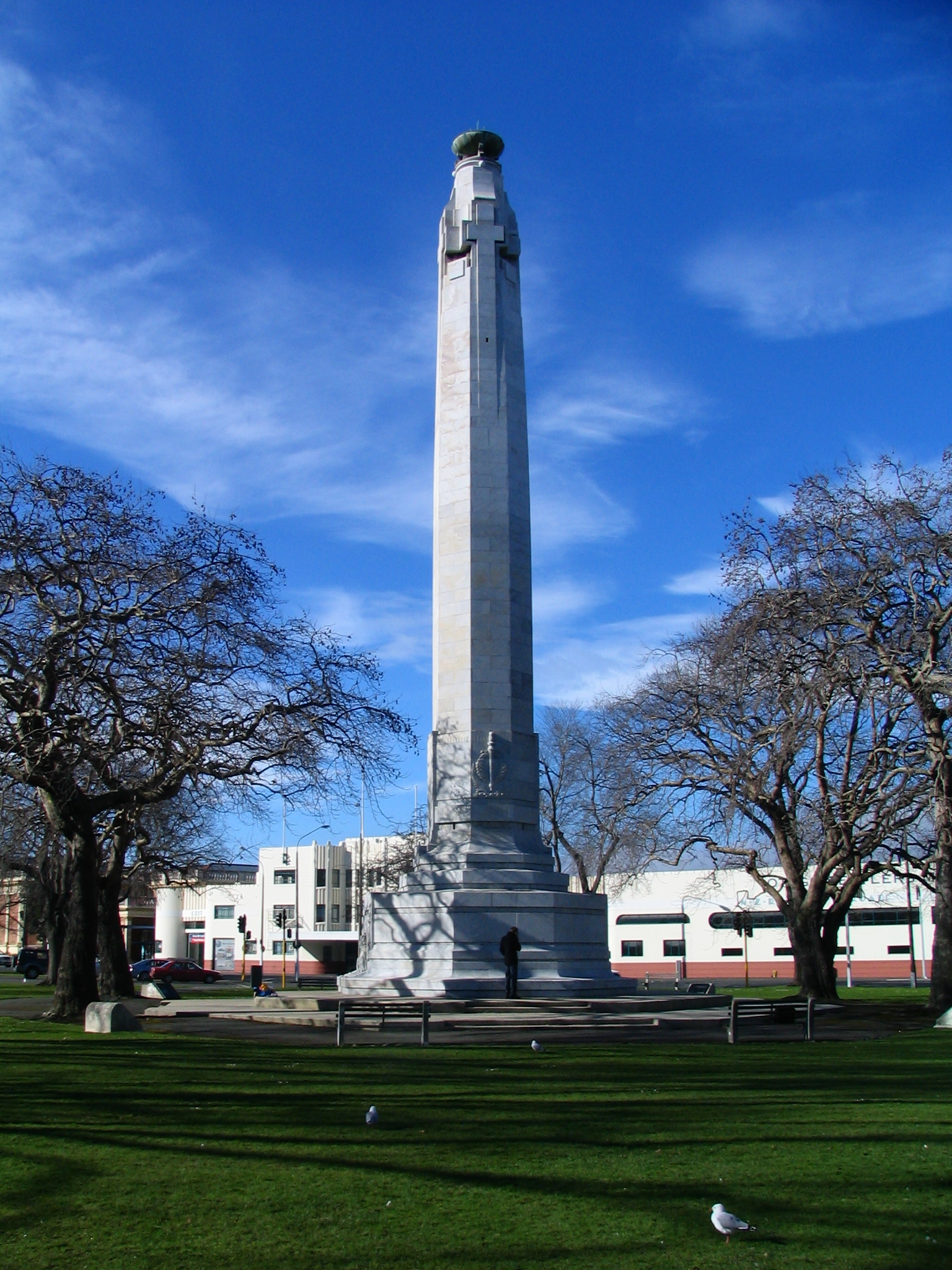
Dunedin Cenotaph, with Toitū Otago Settlers Museum in the background.

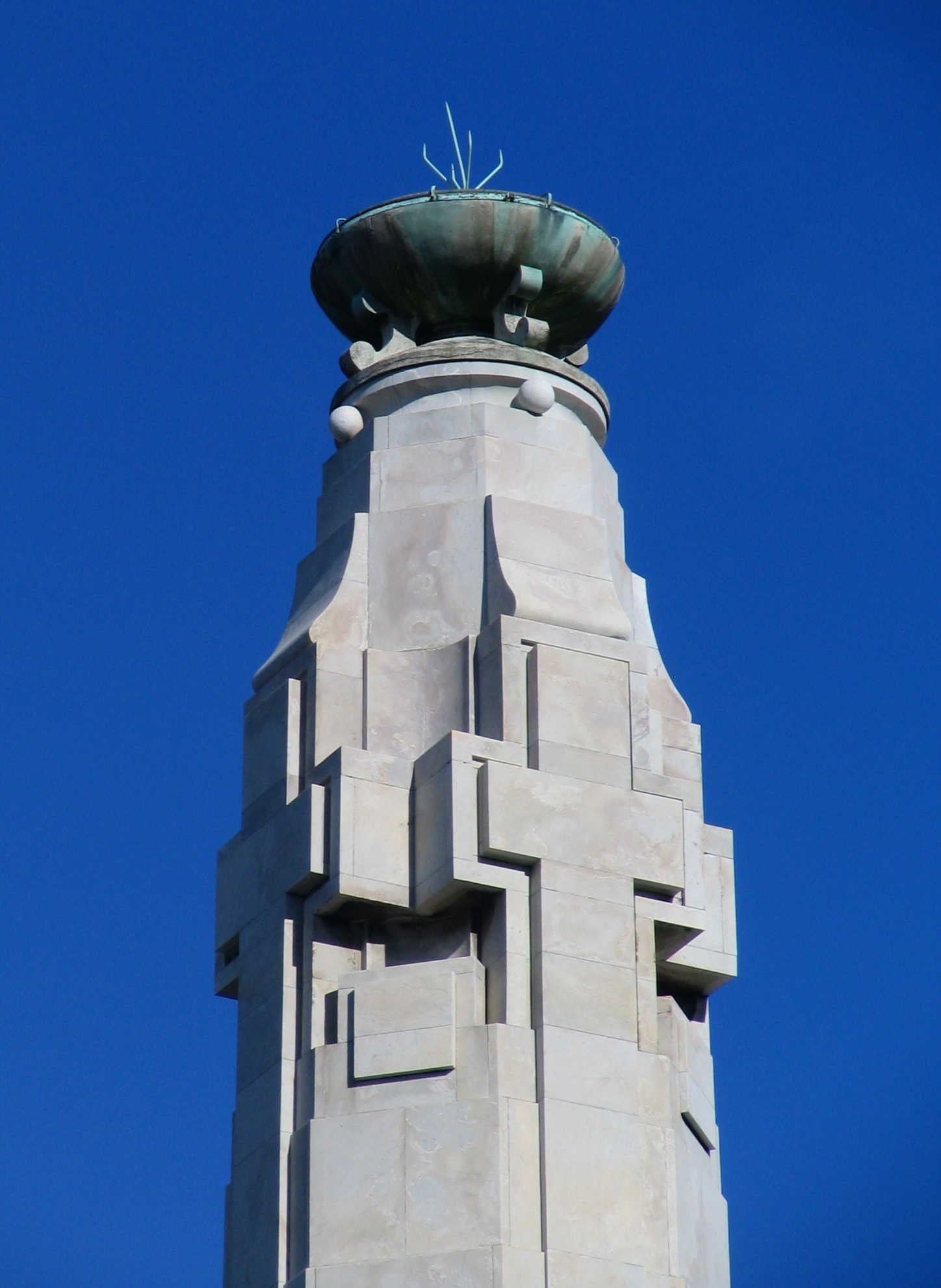
Detail of the top of the Cenotaph

The Cenotaph in the southern New Zealand city of Dunedin stands in the centre of Queens Gardens, close to the city centre. It is the city's main war memorial.

== Location and dedication ==
The cenotaph stands in Queens Gardens, an open park lying between The Exchange and the Toitū Otago Settlers Museum. This location is close to the heart of the city, some 400 metres (440 yd) south of the city centre, The Octagon. Dunedin's renovated Warehouse Precinct lies immediately to the south. One-way streets which form part of SH 1 flank the gardens on its east and west boundaries.

The monument commemorates Dunedin members of New Zealand's armed forces who perished in the First and Second World Wars. A separate standing plaque (formerly situated close to Dunedin Railway Station in Anzac Square) stands close to the cenotaph and lists the names of all of New Zealand's Victoria Cross recipients. Several of the trees surrounding the perimeter of Queens Gardens were planted to remember various war anniversaries, and are accompanied by plaques commemorating these events, and a section of the Toitū Otago Settlers Museum dedicated to New Zealand's participation in the two world wars is also located nearby.

== Construction ==
The monument's design was chosen from 63 entries in a public competition. The winning entry was designed by Aucklander William Gummer (of the firm Gummer and Ford), who also designed several other memorials, including the Bridge of Remembrance in Christchurch.

The monument is built from concrete with a facing of Carrara marble and is topped by a symbolic beacon. It was conceived by Gummer as a 28-metre-tall (92 ft), eight-sided column, a design that reflects Dunedin's octagonal city centre and is well suited for an irregularly shaped site. From the central column, a sacrificial urn and four crosses emerge, symbolising sacrifice. These, along with a relief frieze on the base featuring a lion, torches, laurel wreaths, and fasces, were designed by sculptor Richard Oliver Gross. The original intention was for a bronze frieze to surround the base, but a funding shortfall forced this to be abandoned.

The foundation stone was laid by Dunedin mayor Harold Livingstone Tapley in 1924. Several historic documents were placed in a capsule under the stone, including histories of the military in Otago and copies of current newspapers. The finished memorial was unveiled on 17 March 1927 by Prince Albert, Duke of York (later King George VI), in a ceremony attended by 1,000 relatives of the fallen and 800 returned servicemen, along with many members of the general public. Initially known as the "Citizens' Memorial", it rapidly became known as the Cenotaph (echoing the name of Sir Edwin Lutyens's monument in Whitehall, London) despite not being of the classic "empty tomb" design normally used for structures of this name. A plaque commemorating the fallen of the Second World War was added to the memorial at the conclusion of that conflict.

== Use and recent history ==
The cenotaph is the regular venue of Dunedin's Anzac Day commemorations, which often attract several thousand members of the public. On 25 April 2015, the centennial commemoration of Anzac Day, a record crowd estimated at close to 20,000 people attended the dawn commemoration service at the cenotaph.

The cenotaph has a Heritage New Zealand Category II classification. In the wake of the February 2011 Christchurch earthquake, seismic assessments have been made of many New Zealand buildings and monuments. Assessment of the cenotaph has recommended several measures to strengthen the memorial's structure, and the Dunedin City Council plans to accompany these measures with an assessment of other possible improvements to the Queens Gardens area.
