= Consultancy House =

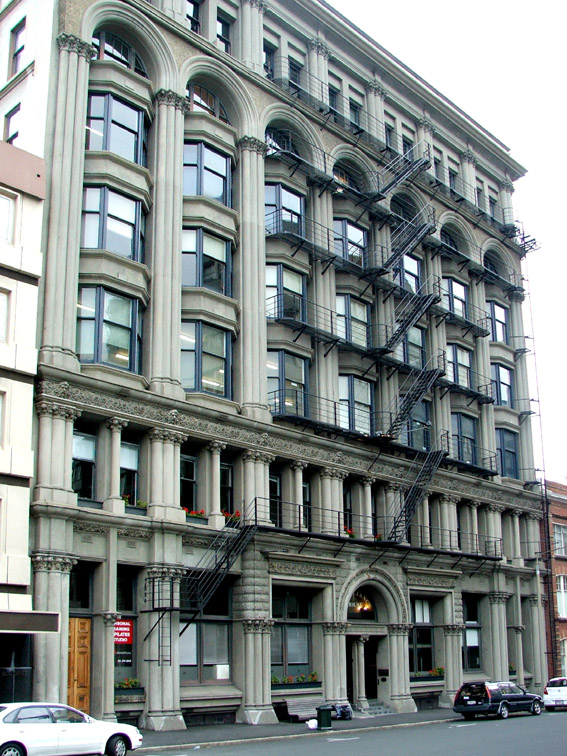
- Consultancy House
- Interactive map of the Consultancy House area
- Former names: MFC Mutual Funds Building
- Alternative names: New Zealand Express Company Building

General information
- Type: Commercial high-rise
- Architectural style: Chicago skyscraper
- Location: The Exchange, Dunedin, 7 Bond Street, Dunedin
- Coordinates: 45.87818°S 170.50268°E
- Construction started: 1908
- Completed: 1910
- Client: New Zealand Express Company

Technical details
- Floor count: 7
- Lifts/elevators: 2

Design and construction
- Architect: Sidney and Alfred Luttrell
- Architecture firm: S. & A. Luttrell
- Civil engineer: C. G. Dunning
- Main contractor: Charles Fleming McDonald

Heritage New Zealand – Category 1
- Official name: MFL Mutual Fund Building
- Designated: 24 November 1983
- Reference no.: 374

Consultancy House is a historic building in The Exchange, in downtown Dunedin, New Zealand. It has a New Zealand Historic Places Trust grade I classification.

Originally known as The New Zealand Express Company Building and also previously known as The MFL Mutual Fund Building, the building is located at the approximate boundary between of the city's Warehouse Precinct and The Exchange in Bond Street, on reclaimed land close to the original city docks. It lies close to Queen's Gardens and to John Wickliffe Plaza, the former site of the Dunedin Exchange Building and now home to Dunedin's largest office block, John Wickliffe House.

The building was constructed in 1908–10 by American-influenced New Zealand architects Sidney and Alfred Luttrell and is an amalgam of Chicago skyscraper design and Edwardian architecture. The façade shows strong Romanesque influence, with prominent columns topped with semicircular arches forming a major architectural feature. The original plans for the building were for five floors topped by a Mansard roof, but during construction a further two storeys were added to the plans. It is widely regarded as New Zealand's first skyscraper, and is certainly the first to follow Chicago school design practices.

It is a larger brother to the Luttrell's 1905 Manchester Courts building in Christchurch, which was extensively damaged in the 2010 Canterbury earthquake. Confusingly, the Manchester Courts building is also often referred to as the New Zealand Express Company Building, as both buildings were constructed as regional headquarters for the same company.

Whereas the Christchurch building made use of a ferroconcrete base and steel-framed upper construction, Consultancy House used ferroconcrete throughout. It was the first building in New Zealand to make use of pre-cast concrete slabs constructed off-site. The ferroconcrete base was used to form a floating raft foundation on the reclaimed site. It appears to have been modelled at least in part on Louis Sullivan's 1887 Chicago Auditorium Building, albeit with far more Victorian and Edwardian colonial architectural embellishments. These embellishments leave the building more in keeping with its neighbours.

The seven-storey building was at the time, excluding church spires, Dunedin's tallest building - and according to some sources was the tallest building in the Southern Hemisphere up to that time. It is considered by many (Manchester Courts notwithstanding) to be the country's first true skyscraper. In its time, it has housed numerous notable tenants, including the Dunedin branch of the New Zealand Stock Exchange and publisher and writer A.H. Reed.

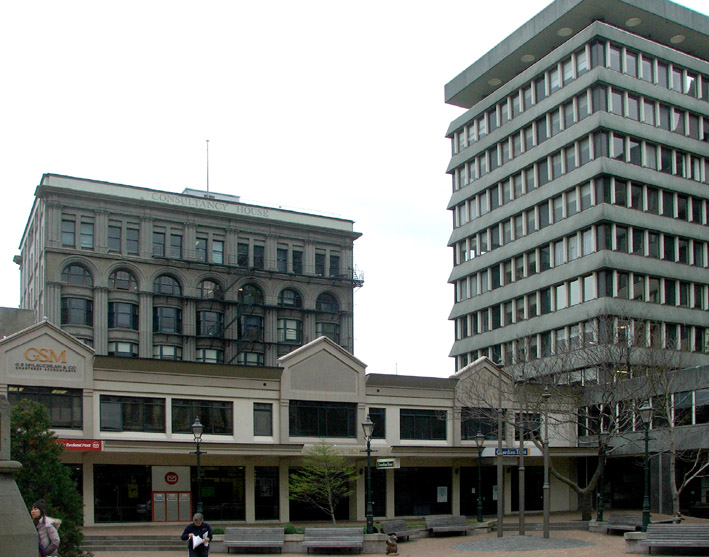
The building is now dwarfed by its more modern neighbour, John Wickliffe House.

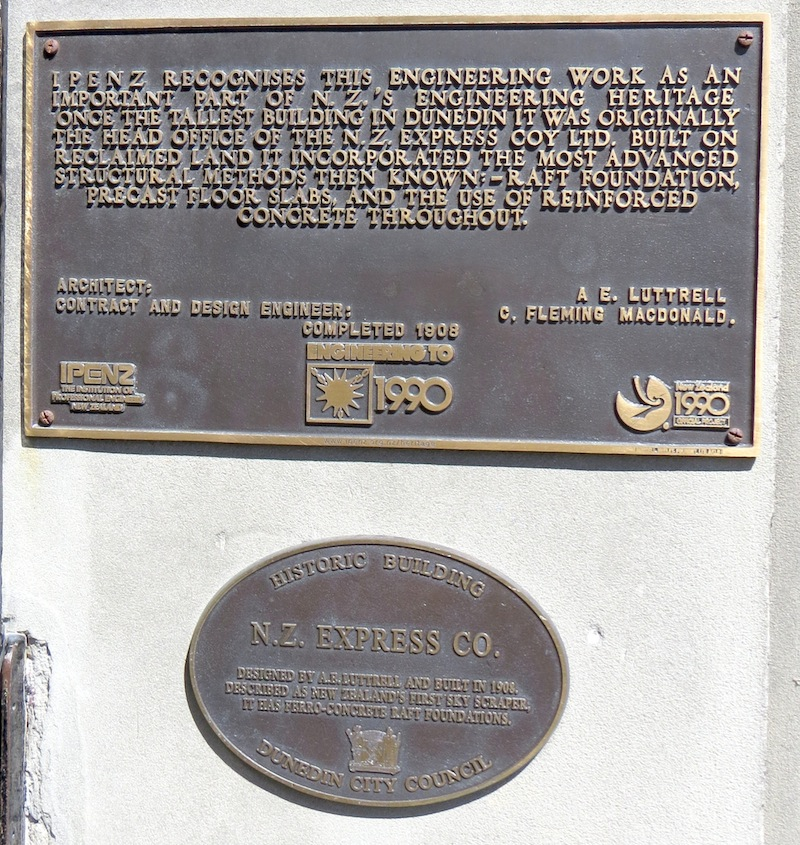
Plaques indicating the historic significance of Consultancy House.

The interior of the building has been extensively remodelled since its construction and is largely lacking in architectural interest, the only notable remaining original feature being the central staircase. Current occupants of the building include a fitness centre on the ground floor and various professional service companies such as accountants on the upper floors.

The main (Bond Street) entrance to the building displays two plaques - one placed by the Dunedin City Council and the other by IPENZ (The Institute of Professional Engineers of New Zealand) recognising the significance of the building's construction.
