= Dunedin Harbourside =

Harbourside
- Suburb
- Interactive map of Harbourside
- Coordinates: 45.874°S 170.518°E
- Country: New Zealand
- City: Dunedin
- Local authority: Dunedin City Council

Area
  - Land: 271 ha (670 acres)

Population (June 2025)
  - Total: 60
  - Density: 22/km^{2} (57/sq mi)

Dunedin North	Opoho	Ravensbourne
Central Dunedin	Dunedin Harbourside
	South Dunedin	(Otago Harbour)

Harbourside is a reclaimed area of land at the head of Otago Harbour in Dunedin, New Zealand. It is separated from the Dunedin central business district by the Main South Line. Most of the land was reclaimed in the 19th century. It is a port and industrial/warehousing area.

A plan to redevelop the area over a 30-year period was backed in 2017 by the Dunedin City Council, Port Otago, the Otago Regional Council and others. The plan was allocated $19.9 million in October 2019 from the Provincial Growth Fund for the first stage of building, but was put on hold in 2020 due to the COVID-19 pandemic.

== Demographics ==
Harbourside covers 2.71 km^{2} (1.05 sq mi) and had an estimated population of 60 as of June 2025, with a population density of 22 people per km^{2}.

Historical population
Year	Pop.	±% p.a.
2006	60	—
2013	48	−3.14%
2018	45	−1.28%

Land reclamation since 1848

Harbourside had a population of 45 at the 2018 New Zealand census, a decrease of 3 people (−6.2%) since the 2013 census, and a decrease of 15 people (−25.0%) since the 2006 census. There were 24 households, comprising 27 males and 18 females, giving a sex ratio of 1.5 males per female. The median age was 23.6 years (compared with 37.4 years nationally), with 3 people (6.7%) aged under 15 years, 21 (46.7%) aged 15 to 29, 18 (40.0%) aged 30 to 64, and 3 (6.7%) aged 65 or older.

Ethnicities were 86.7% European/Pākehā, 13.3% Māori, and 13.3% Asian. People may identify with more than one ethnicity.

The percentage of people born overseas was 26.7, compared with 27.1% nationally.

Although some people chose not to answer the census's question about religious affiliation, 33.3% had no religion, 33.3% were Christian, 6.7% were Muslim and 6.7% had other religions.

Of those at least 15 years old, 12 (28.6%) people had a bachelor's or higher degree, and 3 (7.1%) people had no formal qualifications. The median income was $15,500, compared with $31,800 nationally. 3 people (7.1%) earned over $70,000 compared to 17.2% nationally. The employment status of those at least 15 was that 15 (35.7%) people were employed full-time, 6 (14.3%) were part-time, and 6 (14.3%) were unemployed.

== See also ==
- Pelichet Bay
- Southern Endowment
