= Bank of New Zealand Building, Dunedin =

Building in Dunedin, New Zealand

Bank of New Zealand Building
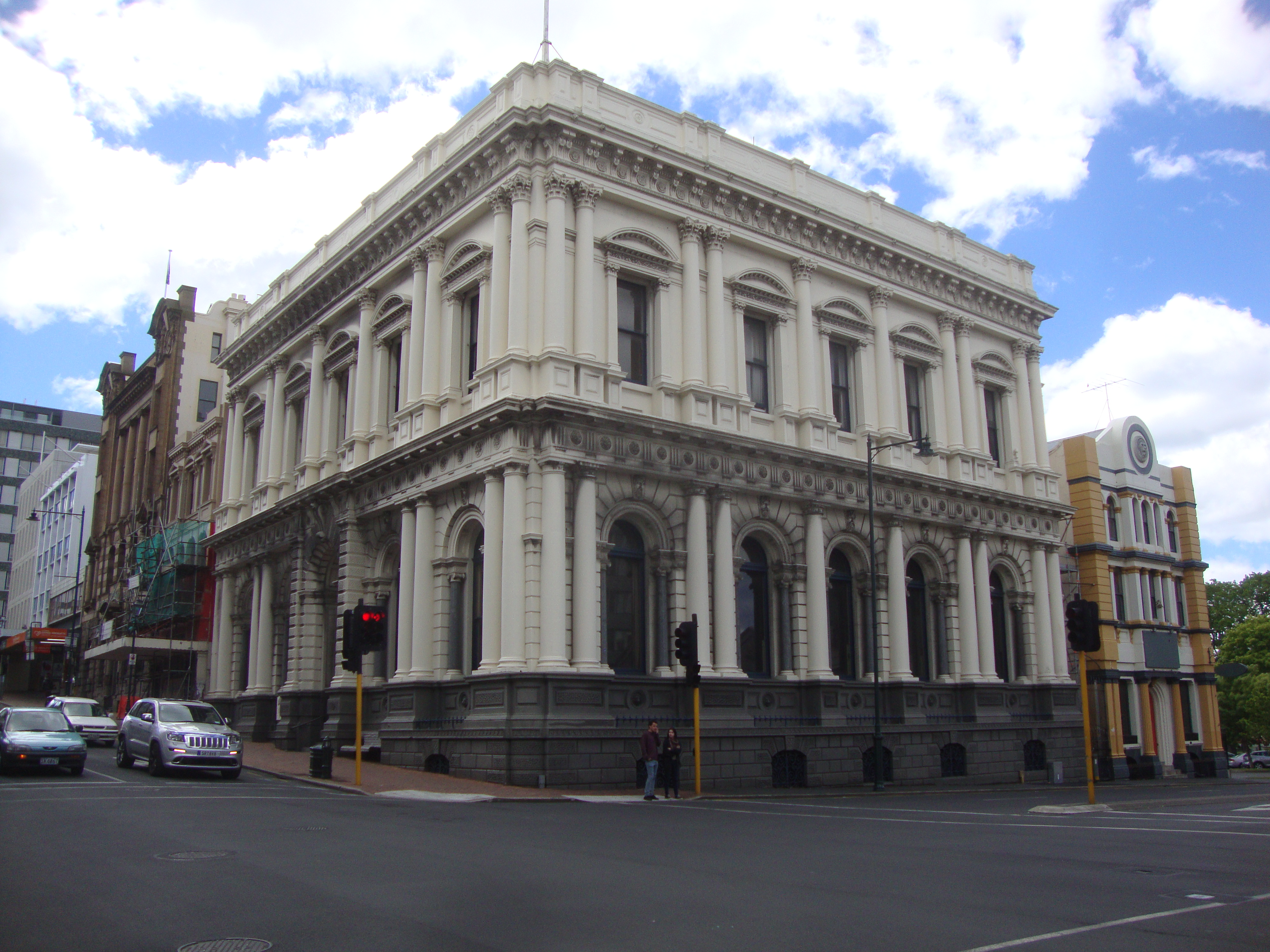
- The Bank of New Zealand Building, Dunedin, in 2012
- Interactive map of the Bank of New Zealand Building area

General information
- Location: Dunedin, New Zealand, 205 Princes Street
- Coordinates: 45.877380°S 170.502080°E
- Opening: 1883

Design and construction
- Main contractor: James Gore

Heritage New Zealand – Category 2
- Designated: 14 December 1995
- Reference no.: 7299

The Bank of New Zealand Building is a historic building in Dunedin, New Zealand.

== History ==
The building, designed by the architect William Barnett Armson, one of the first professional architects to work in New Zealand, was constructed between 1879 and 1883 and is considered his masterpiece. The construction was overseen by contractor James Gore who also the city's mayor at the time.

The building has been listed as a Category 1 historic place by Heritage New Zealand since 1995.

== Description ==
The building is located at 205 Princes Street, in the Exchange precinct of central Dunedin, at the corner with Rattray Street.

The two-story building follows the format of a Venetian Renaissance palazzo, with symmetrical façades in Oamaru stone enriched by sculptures and classical details. A rusticated base in Port Chalmers basalt supports the two main orders: on the ground floor, giant Tuscan columns and round arches supported by Ionic granite columns prevail, while the upper floor features Corinthian columns and windows set in classical aedicules with segmental arches. A cornice with friezes, surmounted by a balustrade with pilasters aligned with the columns below, completes the composition. The decoration, though rich, is always controlled, with reliefs of human faces, vegetal motifs, and naturalistic scenes above the doorway.

Inside, there is a large banking hall with a coffered ceiling embellished with English roses and Scottish thistles.
