= Bank of New Zealand Building, Akaroa =

Building in Akaroa, New Zealand

Bank of New Zealand Building
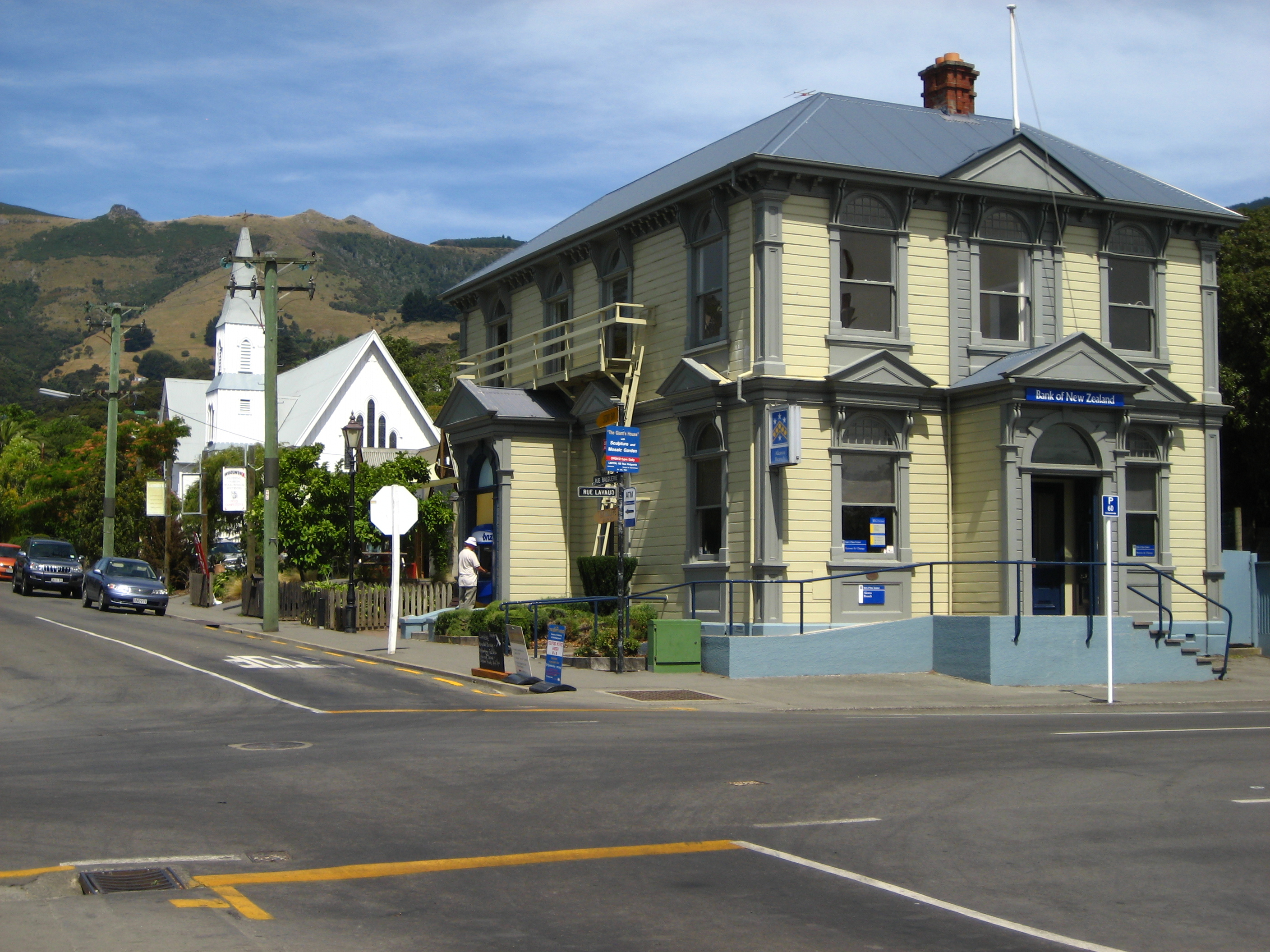
- The Bank of New Zealand Building, Akaroa, in 2009
- Interactive map of the Bank of New Zealand Building area

General information
- Location: Akaroa, New Zealand
- Coordinates: 43.805403°S 172.967253°E

Heritage New Zealand – Category 2
- Designated: 23 June 1983
- Reference no.: 1710

The Bank of New Zealand Building is a historic building in Akaroa, New Zealand.

== History ==
The presence of the Bank of New Zealand in Akaroa dates back to 1863, when it operated an agency on the corner of Rue Lavaud and Rue Benoit until 1865. In 1864, the bank purchased the site at 73 Rue Lavaud, although it did not build on it immediately. After an eight-year absence, the bank returned to the town in 1873, operating from the private residence of the de Malmanche family on Rue Lavaud.

Between 1874 and 1875, it then erected a one-storey timber building in the Italianate style on the Rue Lavaud site. However, due to problems with water ingress, the structure had to be demolished in 1904, being replaced by the present building, designed by architecture firm England Brothers of Christchurch, opening in 1905.

The building underwent restoration work following the 2010 Canterbury earthquake and 2011 Christchurch earthquake.

== Description ==
The building is located at 73 Rue Lavaud in central Akaroa, on the corner with Rue Balguerie.

The two-storey structure was designed to house the offices of the Bank of New Zealand on the ground floor and the manager's residence upstairs, in the Italianate style that shaped the bank's corporate image in the late 19th and early 20th centuries. Built of timber on a rectangular plan and topped with a hipped corrugated-steel roof, it features entrances with pediments and arches, arched windows with ornamental keystones, corner pilasters, and decorative scrolls beneath the eaves.
