= Dunedin Chinese Garden =

Chinese garden in Dunedin, New Zealand

Coordinates: 45.8782°S 170.5054°E

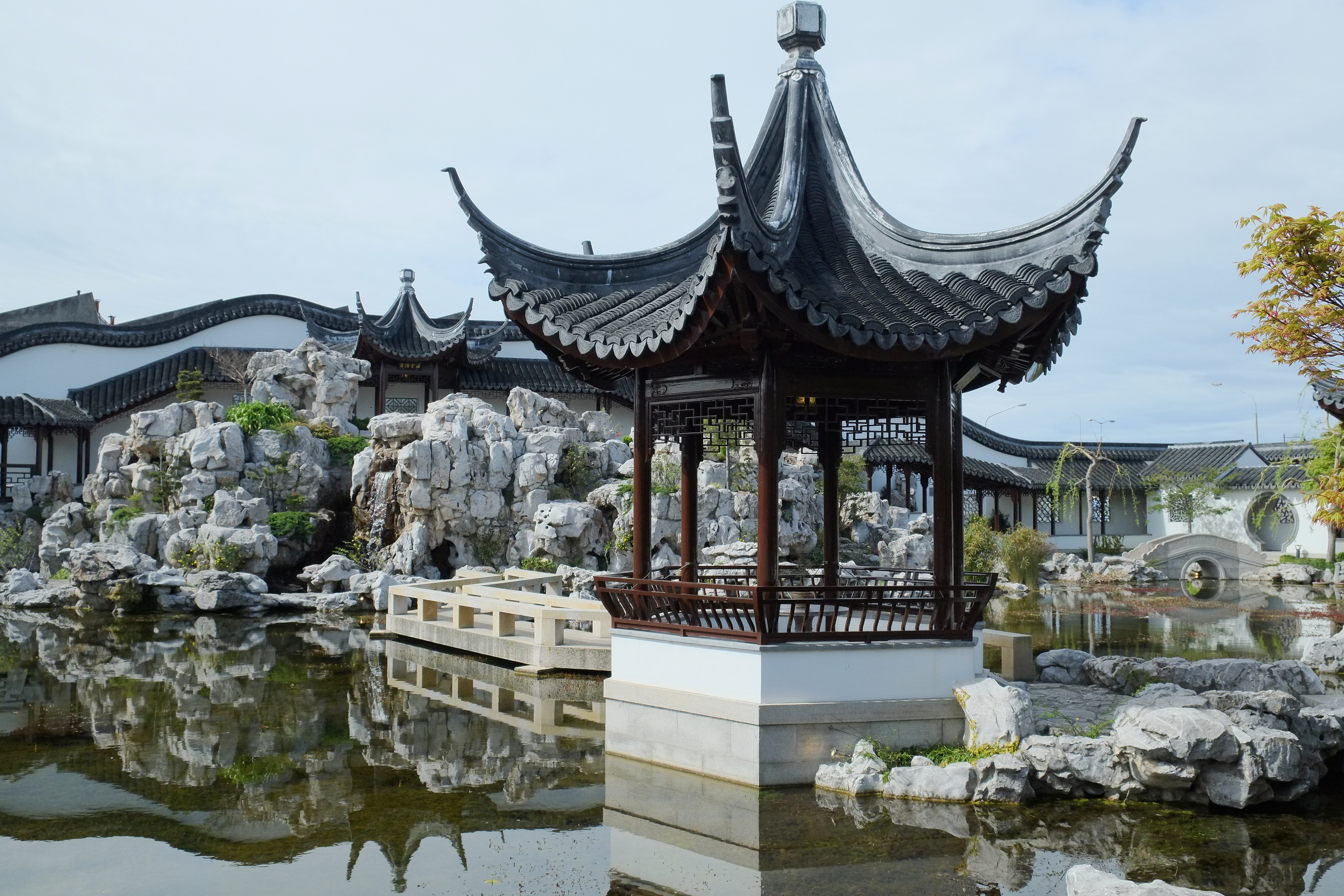
Lan Yuan, Dunedin Chinese Garden showing the climbing mountain half-pavilion and central Chongyuan pavilion.

The Dunedin Chinese Garden (Chinese: 蘭園; pinyin: Lán Yuán) is a Chinese garden located in Dunedin, New Zealand.

The garden is located next to the Toitū Otago Settlers Museum close to the centre of the city and numerous other of the city's tourist attractions, including the Dunedin Railway Station and Queens Gardens.

== Name and commemoration ==
The garden is named Lan Yuan (蘭園). This was specifically chosen as it was considered to be significant on a number of levels. The character lan (蘭, 'orchid') is the third character in the Chinese name for New Zealand (niu xi lan, 紐西蘭), as well as being part of the name of the Yulan magnolia, popularly thought of as the flower of Dunedin's sister city Shanghai. In the booklet about the garden, it is called "The Garden of Enlightenment".

The garden commemorates the contribution of Chinese people to the history and culture of Dunedin. The city has long had a Chinese population, with many Cantonese people settling in and around Dunedin at the time of the Otago gold rush in the 1860s, only some 15 years after the city was founded. Over two percent of Dunedin's population is of Chinese descent, among them the city's mayor at the time of the garden's inauguration, Peter Chin.

== History and construction ==
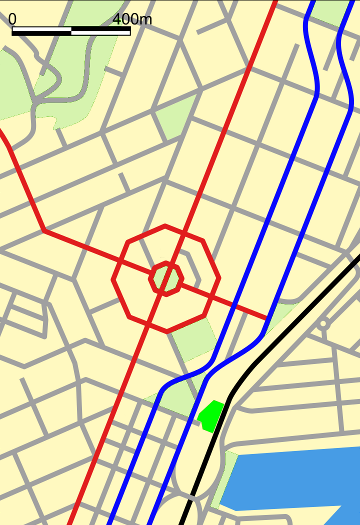
Dunedin Chinese Garden is the bright green area abutting the western side of the railway line (black) in this map of central Dunedin.

The idea of creating a Chinese garden in Dunedin was first raised in 1997 during preparations for the city's 150th anniversary commemorations, which were to take place the following year. As there are strong Chinese elements in the city's history, it was deemed appropriate to create such a garden. A Chinese garden committee was formed, headed by Dr. James Ng, and a site was chosen close to the city's historic railway station and the Otago Settlers' Museum.

Initially there was some concern that the site would prove too windy, and a small but vocal part of the Dunedin population was opposed to the garden's construction. Despite these concerns, foundation stones were laid by delegates from the gardens committee and Dunedin City Council, as well as the deputy mayor of Dunedin's Chinese sister-city, Shanghai, in March 1998. Much of the cost of the project was raised by public donations, though the New Zealand Government announced in 2006 that it would support the project to the tune of NZ$3.75 million.

The garden was created with the support of the Dunedin City Council and the Shanghai Municipal Government. It cost $7 million to construct. The garden is New Zealand's only authentic Chinese garden and one of only three outside China – the first of its kind to be built in the southern hemisphere. The only other two authentic Chinese gardens outside of China are in Portland, USA, and Vancouver, Canada.

The design of the garden evolved over the course of eight years of planning to ensure functionality, accuracy, and authenticity. The garden is in the traditional yuanlin (園林) style, and was designed by Cao Yongkang of Shanghai Jiao Tong University, Chen Ling of Tongji University, and Tan Yufeng of Shanghai Museum. They used as their basis the traditional gardens of the Jiangnan area, specifically because these gardens represent the apogee of Chinese garden style while at the same time being suitable for small sites in urban settings. Construction and design was closely supervised by Shanghai Museum and architects from that city. Much of the garden was pre-fabricated in Shanghai on a site identical to that in Dunedin, then dismantled and re-assembled in New Zealand with the help of Shanghai artisans. The only four items not imported from China are water, the fish in the lake, plants, and concrete.

About 40 workers, artisans and support staff from Shanghai, including two cooks, came to New Zealand under special work visas for the initial construction phase of the garden. They were paid at least the minimum New Zealand wage and were accommodated in a backpackers hotel across the road from the construction site. Another 13 artisans joined them later on to build the Pai Lou gateway and finish the garden's features, lay courtyards and mosaics. The working hours were typically 7:30am to 5pm with one hour lunch break, seven days per week, with one day off each month. The construction work included the pouring of 560 cubic metres (20,000 cu ft) of concrete, the use of over 280 tonnes of sand, 130 tonnes of hand-finished granite paving stones, as well as 380,000 hand-made roof tiles, and hand-constructed bricks and lattice-work.

Almost 1000 tonnes of rock from Lake Tai – an important feature of Chinese architecture for over 1000 years – was imported for the construction to New Zealand in over 40 shipping containers. Taihu faces environmental damage from excessive quarrying from the lake floor. Most of these prized rocks form the climbing mountain, with about a third used for lining the edges of the pond and various rock features in the garden.

The garden was blessed in June 2008, in the presence of Prime Minister Helen Clark and Chinese ambassador Zhang Yuanyuan and opened to the public the following month. Clark returned to officially open the garden in September 2008.

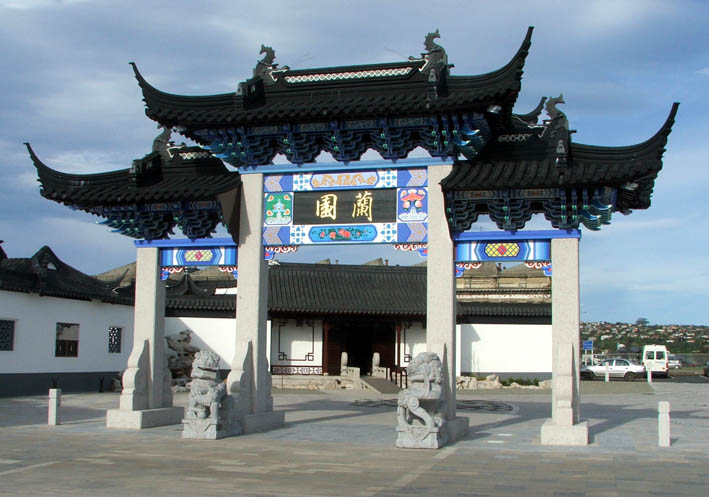
Pai Lou gateway at the entrance to the garden.

== Garden features ==
Lan Yuan is designed as a late Ming/early Qing scholar’s garden, and is separated from the rest of the city by a 4 metres (13 ft) perimeter wall. It is centered on a large lake, around which are numerous structures: an entrance hall, a square pavilion, a study, a climbing mountain with a half-pavilion and corridor, a tea house, and a two-storey tower block housing a conference room. A zig-zag bridge crosses the lake and connects with Chongyuan, the central "Heart of the Lake" pavilion.

In front of the entrance to the garden stands an elaborate Pai Lou archway as "the face" of the garden. The entrance to the garden is flanked by two lion statues which were hand-sculptured from solid granite and gifted to the Dunedin Chinese Garden Trust by the Municipal Government of Shanghai. Just in front of the main door, a "river" forms a boundary between the outside and inside worlds.

Traditional Chinese construction methods were applied throughout the garden to avoid the use of any nails or other corrodible materials. All wooden structures, made from Chinese fir, are held together using mortise and tenon joints. The timber has been coated in seven layers of protective lacquer to preserve its look and against decay. All of the wooden columns rest on hand-carved granite plinths sitting on the floor's granite slabs. This separates the timber from the ground to further prevent rotting. Hand-carved hexagonal lanterns with shades depicting typical Chinese landscape paintings provide evening lighting for the corridors of the path running inside along the perimeter walls.

All of the hand-made terracotta roof tiles are from Suzhou, and include drip tiles to control the direction of the water running off the roofs and falling directly on the ground, as is practice in traditional Chinese garden design. The faces of the tiles are decorated with flower symbols, a sign that the garden is a public garden.

The corridors of the garden are paved with hand-made tiles in a herringbone pattern, while the different courtyards contain pebble mosaics hand-laid on site by the Chinese artisans in intricate patterns. Over two tonnes of pebbles, also brought out from China, were used in the garden.

Other traditional features of the garden include a curved bridge, a moon gate, and a double corridor. Potted plants and sculptures along the paths and in the courtyard between the tower block and the tea house complete the tranquil ambience. The buildings in the garden include a tea house, which would traditionally be a dining room for the scholar and guests, a study serving as a sanctuary, the tower block, and three pavilions, the hexagonal Heart of the Lake pavilion, a half pavilion at the highest point of the climbing mountain rockery, and one square pavilion.

Particular care was taken in the balance of movement and static elements, with the latter predominating. The most important vistas were to be those overlooking the central lake, with elements of movement and stasis linked by winding paths.

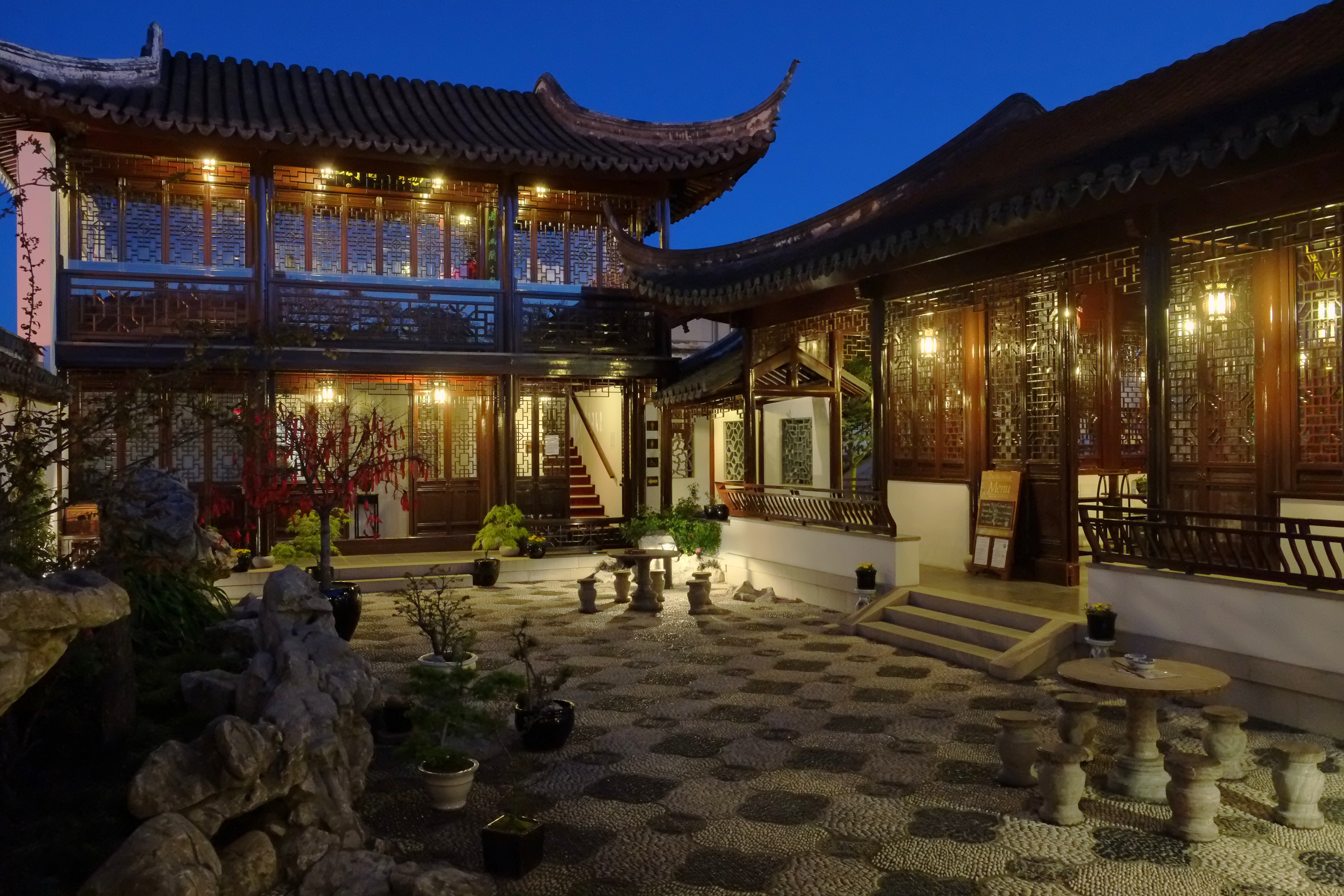
Courtyard in Lan Yuan, Dunedin Chinese Garden at night.

== Tourism ==
The garden's site covers an area of some 2,500 square metres (27,000 sq ft). Trees planted around the outside of the garden walls will eventually shield the garden from many of the views and noises of the city which surrounds it, completing it as a peaceful oasis close to the inner city. As of 2013 over 30,000 people per year visit Lan Yuan, Dunedin Chinese Garden.

The garden is open seven days per week and includes a gift shop selling unique gifts not seen in typical souvenir shops. Visitors can also purchase and enjoy Chinese teas, steamed buns and dumplings at the Tea House shop. The Dunedin Chinese Garden is also a popular venue for weddings, small business meetings and functions.
