= Sammys (Dunedin) =

Historic theatre and live-performance venue in New Zealand

Sammy's Entertainment Venue
- Interactive map of Sammy's Entertainment Venue
- Former names: His Majesty’s Theatre, Agricultural Hall
- Address: 65 Crawford Street; Dunedin; New Zealand
- Coordinates: 45°52′49″S 170°30′08″E
- Owner: Dunedin City Council
- Capacity: ~400

Construction
- Opened: 19th century
- Closed: 2010s (venue operations)

Sammy's Entertainment Venue, more commonly known as Sammy’s, is a historic entertainment venue in the Warehouse Precinct of Dunedin, New Zealand. From the late nineteenth century until the 2010s, it operated in various forms, including as a theatre, cinema, nightclub, and live music venue. The building is now owned by the Dunedin City Council and is closed to the public due to structural and hazardous material concerns.

== History ==
The site was originally used as the Agricultural Hall, operated by the Otago Agricultural and Pastoral Society in the late nineteenth century.

In 1902–1903, the building was redeveloped and reopened as His Majesty’s Theatre, hosting occasional film screenings and live performances. Under successive managements, including Fuller-Hayward and later Kerridge-Odeon, the building continued as a theatre until the early 1940s. The original ornate Renaissance-style facade was demolished in 1975 after the building was condemned.

== Sammy’s nightclub and music venue ==
In 1983, the building was converted into a restaurant, bar and nightclub by owner Sam Chin and began operating under the name Sammy’s. Alterations included changes to the balcony and stage layout and the addition of a porch and signage. Over subsequent decades, the venue hosted performances by local, national and international acts and became part of Dunedin's live music scene.

== Closure and council ownership ==
The venue ceased regular operations in the mid-2010s following difficulties, including a declined liquor licence. The building was put on the market and subsequently purchased by the Dunedin City Council in January 2017 for NZ$128,000 to protect it from demolition, though the council did not acquire the land beneath the building.

At the time of purchase, the council considered Sammy's as one of several potential sites for a new performing arts centre. A feasibility study noted the building could seat up to approximately 400 people but had the highest estimated upgrade costs among options studied.

== Condition and redevelopment ==
Council-commissioned reports identified significant issues with the building’s structural integrity and hazardous materials, including asbestos and seismic deficiencies. Because of these concerns, public access to the building has been restricted.

The building has been made weather-tight in parts, but as of 2026, no definitive plans for redevelopment or reuse have been confirmed. The council's long-term planning includes funding for new performance spaces, but Sammy’s was ruled out as the primary site due to cost and other constraints.

== Later events ==
In April 2022, an unauthorised concert was held inside the vacant building by local musicians, attracting an audience of about 100 people. The event received media coverage and renewed public discussion about the venue’s future and the availability of mid-sized performance spaces in Dunedin.
