= The Exchange, Dunedin =

Area of Dunedin, New Zealand

Coordinates: 45°52′42″S 170°30′05″E

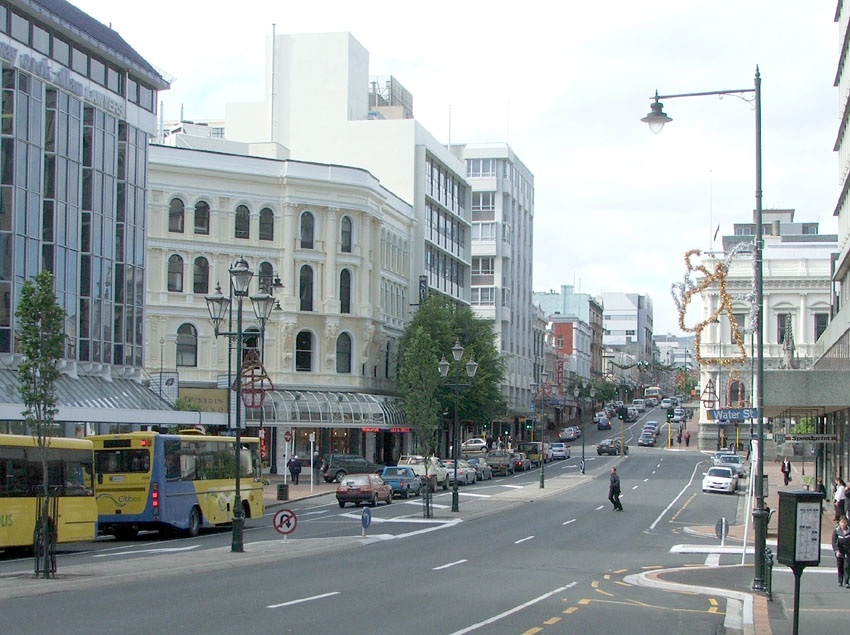
From the Exchange, looking north up Princes Street. The historic Southern Cross Hotel building is prominent, centre-left; the former BNZ bank building is centre-right.

The Exchange is an area of central Dunedin, in the South Island of New Zealand.

The area was the original heart of Dunedin's CBD, although that has now moved north to an area around the city's central plaza (The Octagon) and George Street, which leads north from it. The Exchange takes its name from the former Dunedin Stock Exchange building, which stood at the heart of the area until it was demolished in the 1960s.

== Geography ==
Central Dunedin. The 4 is placed at the location of John Wickliffe Plaza.

The Exchange is located around 400 metres (440 yd) south of The Octagon, on and around Princes Street, and in centred around John Wickliffe Plaza and the adjacent John Wickliffe House. Here, Princes Street reaches its lowest point, having descended from the stump of Bell Hill to what was once on Dunedin's Otago Harbour shoreline. Below the Exchange, Princes Street rises slightly as it heads south towards South Dunedin.

To the east of the Exchange lies an open grass reserve, Queens Gardens and the northern end of the Warehouse Precinct. This latter precinct was the site of Dunedin's early docks and warehousing, but has been gentrified since the late 1990s and is now the site of numerous cafes and small businesses. The docks have moved further east after significant reclamation in the late 19th century. State Highway 1 bisects and borders the Warehouse Precinct, divided into two one-way streets (the northbound Crawford Street and southbound Cumberland Street).

To the west of the Exchange are the lower slopes of City Rise, accessed via High Street and Rattray Street. These streets lead to the hill suburbs of Mornington and Roslyn.

Several small streams have historically run through the Exchange, although they now pass through subterranean courses. The most notable is the Toitū Stream, which can still be seen in its upper course close to Serpentine Avenue and MacLaggan Street in City Rise.

== History ==
Now several hundred metres inland from the edge of the Otago Harbour, the site was originally coastal, and was one of several landing places used by Kāti Māmoe and Kāi Tahu Māori. It had a gently sloping beach and access to fresh water and hunting, making it an ideal spot for settlement, and was still in use at the time of the first European colonisers. Known as Toitū tauraka waka, it became a major point of interaction between Māori and pākeha in Dunedin's early history. The site is recognised by a plaque at John Wickliffe Plaza, and by a Heritage New Zealand Wāhi Tāpuna designation as a place important for its significance to Māori for historical, cultural, and traditional reasons. Reclamation of the foreshore led to the loss of the tauraka waka and the associated Princes Street Reserve, leading to a Māori grievance which would not be settled for over a century. The matter was finally settled as part of Waitangi Treaty claims in 1998.

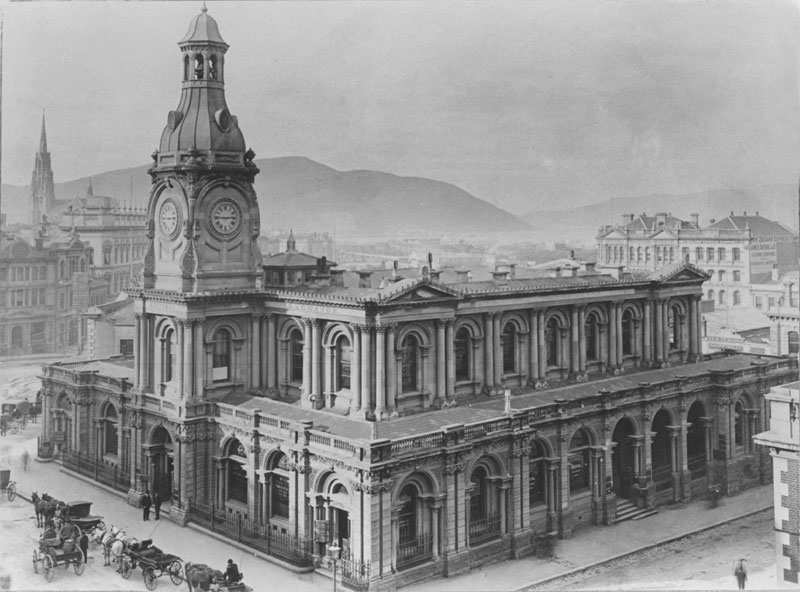
The Exchange Building, designed by William Mason and demolished in the 1960s to make way for John Wickliffe House, gave the area its name

The Exchange was the site of the original landing place of settlers from the two ships which brought the Otago Association's settlers to Dunedin, and was the site of the homes and offices of the city's founder, Captain William Cargill and chief surveyor Charles Kettle. The two ships, the John Wickliffe and the Philip Laing, arrived in early 1848. As they could not negotiate the harbour, they set anchor at the Otago Heads. Settlers from the ships travelled by smaller rowing boat from there to Dunedin.

Massive reclamation of the area led to the creation of a wide strip of land, since occupied by commercial premises, warehousing, and the main rail line. The original nature of the site is reflected in the names of Jetty Street and Water Street, both of which cross Princes Street close to the Exchange. This part of Princes Street was at one point the location of a bridge across the Toitu Stream, now diverted underground. A spring which fed the stream is still used as the source of water for Speight's Brewery, located 200 metres to the northwest on Rattray Street.

The Exchange was at one time a complex intersection with two busy streets, Rattray Street and High Street. These lead from the twin streets which make up State Highway 1 at Queen's Gardens to the older hill suburbs to the west. As such, it also became a major transport hub, with both buses and Dunedin's trams utilising the area as a major nexus. Though these streets originally both crossed Princes Street, civic planning has reduced High Street at the intersection to a minor road, and John Wickliffe Plaza now covers part of the original intersection.

Today, though it is no longer the city's business centre, the Exchange is a vibrant area containing both office buildings and small eateries. Dowling Street, at the northern extreme of the Exchange, is the heart of Dunedin's art scene, with several galleries, notably including Milford Galleries and Blue Oyster Art Project Space.

== Buildings and features ==
The former Exchange Building, from which the Exchange takes its name, was an impressive structure, designed by William Mason as a Post Office and later occupied by the University of Otago and the Otago Museum. Next to this was the 1863 Customhouse building, and outside the two was an open space known as Customhouse Square. The Exchange building was pulled down in 1969, and it was largely the destruction of this building that led to changes in attitudes by Dunedinites regarding the change of their cityscape. Since this time, changes to the city's old buildings have been met with vociferous protests. The Customhouse building is also long since gone.

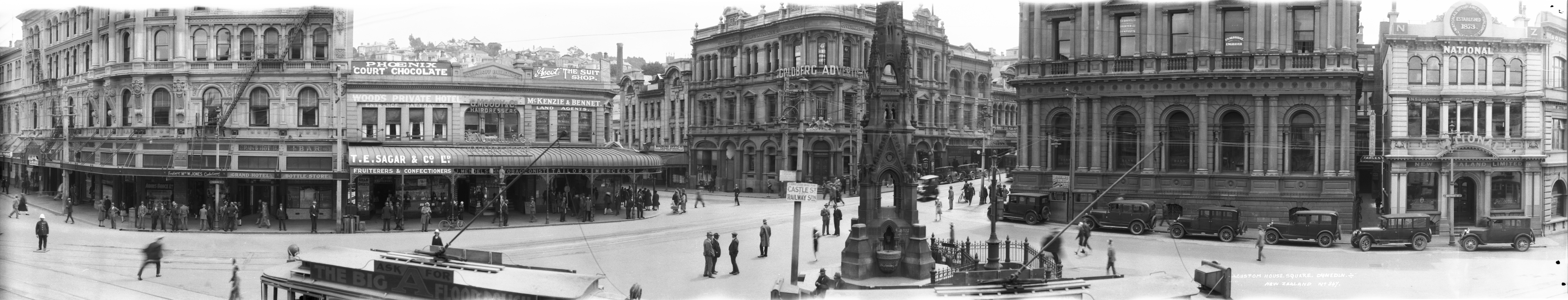
Customhouse Square during the 1920s

Today, the site of the buildings is the location of one of Dunedin's biggest office blocks, John Wickliffe House, and the adjacent John Wickliffe Plaza. Both are named for the John Wickliffe, the first of the two ships which brought the Otago Association's settlers to Dunedin (a nearby building, Philip Laing House, is named for the other of these two ships). Despite this, the area is the site of several prominent Victorian buildings, notably former bank buildings at the northern end of the area.

John Wickliffe Plaza is the site of one of Dunedin's more notable public monuments, the Cargill Monument, dedicated to city founder Captain William Cargill. This monument, designed by Charles Robert Swyer and built in 1863-4, was originally sited in the Octagon, but was moved to the Exchange in 1872. The monument is listed (Category I) by Heritage New Zealand. The Plaza contains several other items of public sculpture, notably a series of three small brass penguins called "We are not alone", sculpted by Parry Jones and unveiled in 1999. A Historic Places Trust blue plaque at the foot of the Cargill Monument marks the location of the first Salvation Army meeting in New Zealand, held at the site in April 1883.

=== Heritage New Zealand listed buildings ===
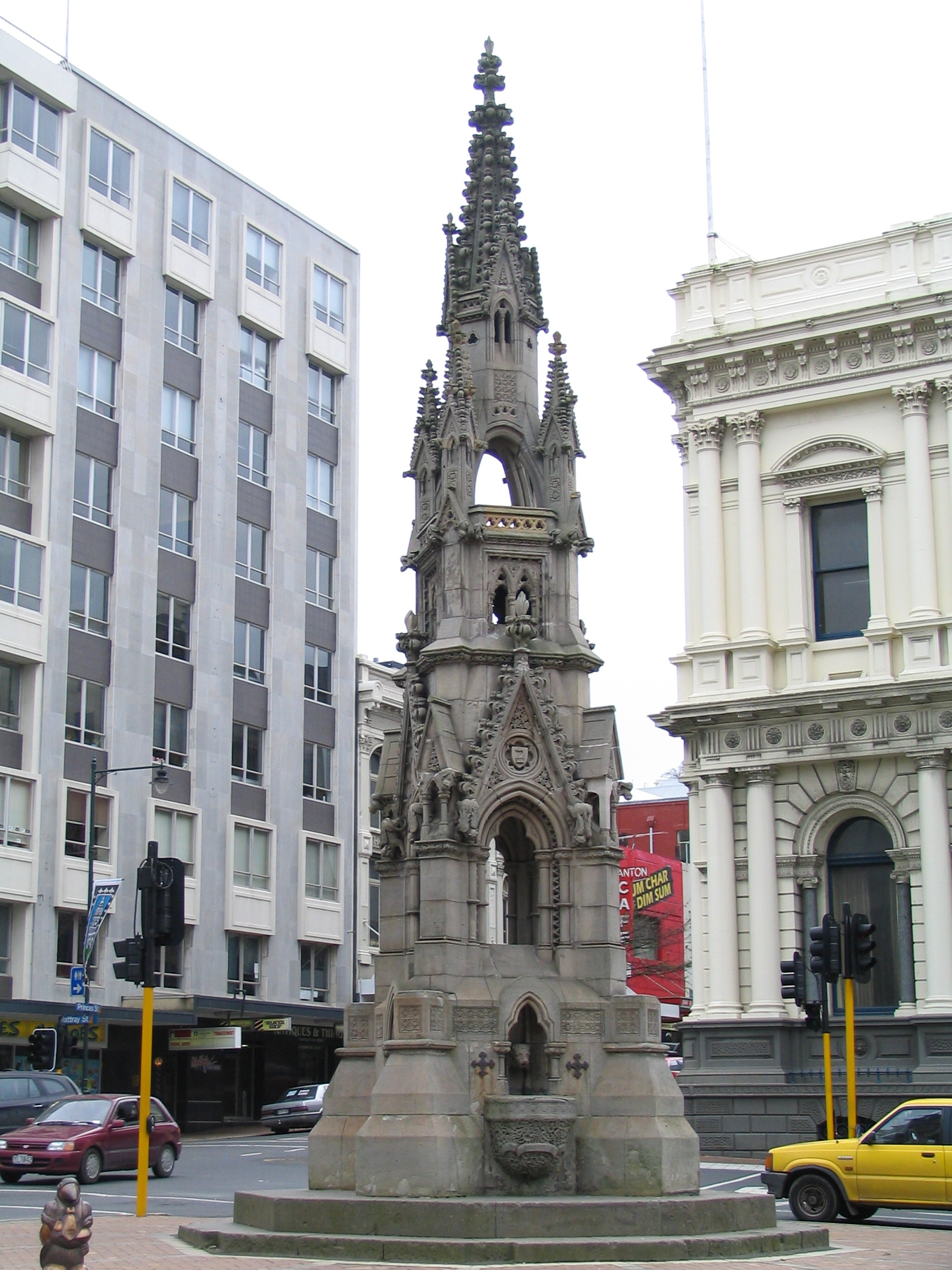
The Cargill Monument is a prominent feature of John Wickliffe Plaza. Behind it (to the right) is the historic former Bank of New Zealand Building.

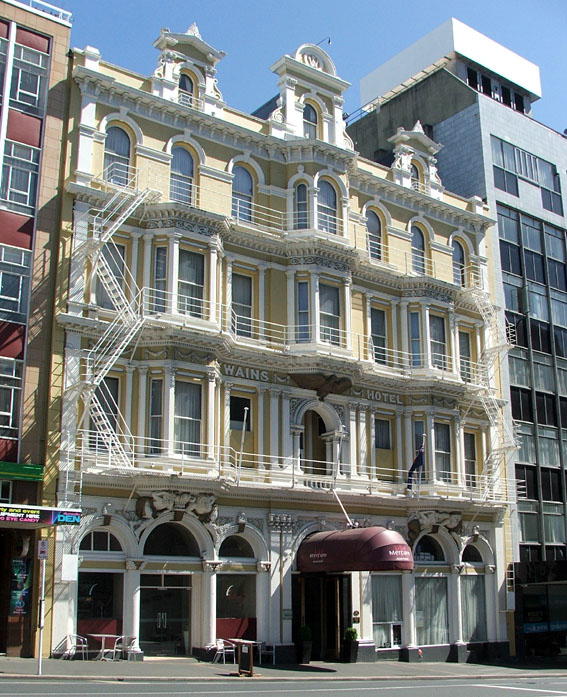
Wain's Hotel building, in the Exchange

The lower Exchange contains one of Dunedin's more notable public houses. Wain's Hotel, immediately opposite the former Post Office building, is an imposing Italianate structure built in 1878 from designs by Mason and Wales. Few place in New Zealand contain as many Heritage New Zealand Category I or Category II protected buildings within such a small area. These buildings include the following:

- Dowling Street Steps, cnr of Dowling and Princes Sts (Category II). The steps were designed and built in 1926 to link Princes Street with Tennyson Street, at the top of the stump of Bell Hill.
- The former Excelsior Hotel Building, 152–158 Princes St (cnr of Dowling and Princes Sts) (Category II). This imposing structure was built by Robert Forrest in 1888 and is in the Victorian Renaissance Revival style.
- The former Salvation Army fortress, 37 Dowling St (Category II).
- The former Garrison Hall, 8 Dowling St (Category I).
- Milford Galleries building, 20 Dowling St (Category I).
- The Commerce Building, cnr Dowling St and Burlington St (Category II).
- The Imperial Building, 1 Dowling St (cnr Dowling St and Queens Gardens) (Category II).
- The National Bank Building, 193 Princes St (Category I). Designed by William Dunning, an Australian architect, and Charles Fleming MacDonald, this building is reminiscent of many of the grander buildings in Melbourne and Sydney. Constructed in a neo-Baroque style, it uses Tasmanian sandstone and trachyte as a major feature in its façade, and was completed in 1913. Continuing the history of the building be tenanted by financial institutions, the building was for many years home to MTF, a vehicle finance company.
- The façades of the Former Exchange Court Building and the Thomson, Bridger and Company building, 194 Princes St (Category II) feature ornate Victorian and Edwardian plasterwork. The Exchange Court building was originally built by jeweller John Hislop in 1881 as shops and offices, but in 1915 was converted to Everybody's Theatre. It operated as an 850-seat theatre and then a cinema (The Roxy) until 1931, when it was converted to a shop. In 2026 it was announced that the neighbouring building, Philip Laing House, would be turned into a hotel, with a reception area and conference rooms in the Exchange Court and Thomson, Bridger and Company buildings.
- The Bank of New Zealand Building, 205 Princes St (cnr. Princes and High Sts) (Category I). Designed in Venetian Renaissance styling, the 1882 BNZ building stands just two doors along from the National Bank building. The William Armson-designed building is notable for the richly carved exterior work by Louis Godfrey and moulded ceilings in its interior. The façade combines Doric, Ionic and Corinthian styles, and makes good use of Port Chalmers bluestone and Oamaru stone, a compact, cream-coloured limestone.
- The Southern Cross Hotel, 118 High St (cnr. High and Princes Sts) (Category I). One of Dunedin's principal hotels, the Southern Cross is housed in an impressive 1883 building designed by Louis Boldini. It occupies a prominent corner site in the heart of the Exchange. Formerly the Grand Hotel, the building has been extended considerably on several occasions in its history, and was considerably renovated in the 1980s, though most of its original features remain. The Southern Cross Hotel Building is home to Dunedin Casino.
- The former Taimex Building, 126 Rattray St (Category II).
- The Clarion Building, 282–292 Princes St (Category II). This 1878 William Mason building was originally a major drapery store in the heart of what was then Dunedin's retail district. The exterior is of Venetian Gothic style, though the interior has been largely redeveloped in recent years.
- Consultancy House, 7 Bond St (Category I). A seven-storey 1908 building regarded (by dint of its construction methods) as New Zealand's first skyscraper.
- The Chief Post Office Building, 283 Princes St (Category II). Designed by John Mair and the Governments Architects Office, construction was severely delayed by the Great Depression. Originally intended to be built in the early 1930s, it was not completed until 1937. A sturdy and impressive structure, possibly modelled on some of the government architecture in vogue in the United Kingdom during this era, the building held Dunedin's main post office branch until the late 1980s and continued in use as postal offices until 1997. The building remained empty for some time after this. Many plans were put forward for its use, including a hotel, a new site for the city's public library, and offices for either the Dunedin City Council or Otago Regional Council. In 2013, an extensive renovation of the lower few floors began, with Silver Fern Farms moving in on the ground and first floors as anchor tenant in February 2014. Later in the decade the interior of the building was further transformed, turning ito a 4-star hotel, the Distinction Dunedin Hotel.
- Wain's Hotel, 310 Princes St (Category I). Built in 1879 to a design by Mason & Wales, Wain's Hotel remains Dunedin's grandest hotel building, and reflects the opulence which followed the Otago gold rush of the 1860s. The interior has been substantially remodelled, but the exterior's Italianate Renaissance façade remains largely intact. This latter features much intricate work by mason George Munro, notably the figures found carved within the panelled spandrels and supporting the façade's oriel windows.
- The ANZ Bank Building, Dunedin, 319 Princes St (Category II). Robert Lawson's 1874 Union Bank of Australasia building is the only classical temple form structure in Dunedin. It is a partner to the architect's work on bank buildings in Oamaru, and features carved Corinthian columns by Godfrey. The building continued to be used as a bank until 1992, and now houses a night club.

== Bibliography ==
- Herd, J.; Griffiths, G. J. (1980). Discovering Dunedin. Dunedin: John McIndoe. ISBN 0-86868-030-3.
- Johnson, D. (1993). Dunedin: A pictorial history. Christchurch: Canterbury University Press. ISBN 0-908812-33-7.
- Knight, H.; Wales, N (1988). Buildings of Dunedin. Dunedin: John McIndoe. ISBN 0-86868-106-7.
- Otago sculpture trails: Dunedin city and beyond. Dunedin: Otago Sculpture Trust. 2005. OCLC 225963992.
- Architecture Dunedin. Dunedin: Parker Warburton Team Architects. 2010.
- Reed, A. H. (1956). The story of early Dunedin. Wellington: A.H. & A.W. Reed.
