= Toitū Otago Settlers Museum =

Museum in Dunedin, New Zealand

Coordinates: 45.877521°S 170.505795°E

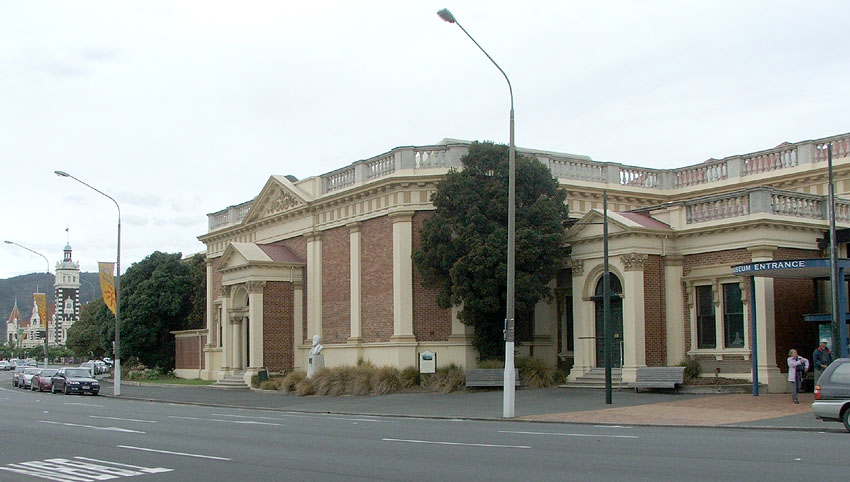
- Toitū Otago Settlers Museum main wing (Dunedin Railway Station is visible in the background)
- Established: 1898
- Location: 31 Queens Gardens, Dunedin, New Zealand
- Website: www.toituosm.com

The Toitū Otago Settlers Museum is a regional history museum in Dunedin, New Zealand. Its brief covers the territory of the old Otago Province, that is, New Zealand from the Waitaki River south, though its main focus is the city of Dunedin. It is New Zealand's oldest history museum.

== History ==
Founded in 1898, the 50th anniversary of the Scottish settlement of Otago, by the Otago Early Settlers' Association, by 1908 the museum was located in a building in Queen's Gardens Dunedin, designed by John Burnside. Originally concerned only with the pioneer European settlers, initially just those who arrived between 1848 and the first of the Otago gold rushes in 1861, the institution gradually enlarged its scope to include later arrivals. At that point the word 'early' was dropped from the name of the Museum and the Association. Its collections evolved reflecting these changes but remain focused on the historical period, i.e. since James Cook's first visit to southern New Zealand in 1770.

In 1927 the museum took over the adjoining building, also designed by Burnside, vacated by the Dunedin Public Art Gallery. The institution sometimes struggled financially finding little support from the city council. Comparable museums in two other New Zealand cities, Auckland and Wellington, were closed after the second world war and their collections dispersed. The country's interest in its own history was at a low ebb. The period 1949 to 1977 has been called 'Decline and Fall?' and the museum might have died. The buildings were extensive, the collections considerable and varied, comprehending furniture, apparel, technology - including household appliances and vehicles - as well as archives and works of art. Maintenance and even heating presented formidable challenges.

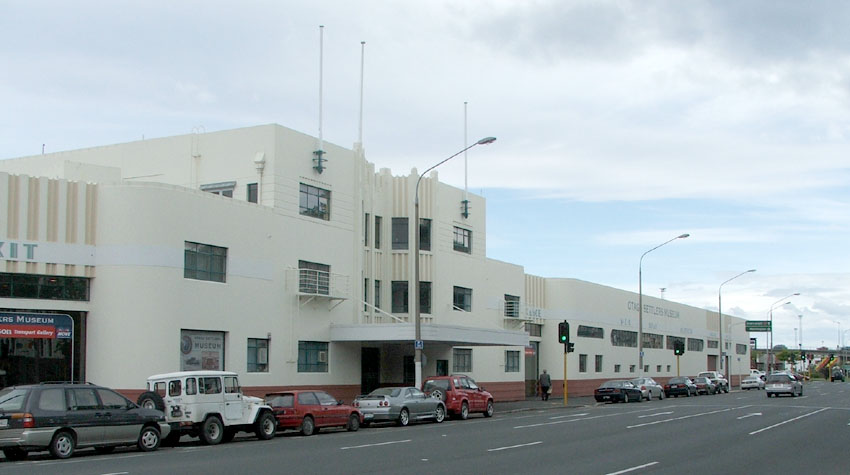
The transport wing, formerly Dunedin's NZR Road Services Bus Station.

In 1978 a new director, Seddon Bennington, embarked on a programme of renewal. A later Director, Elizabeth Hinds, continued the museum's resurgence. The Dunedin City Council provided grants increasingly covering costs and in 1991 took over the museum's ownership and operation. The neighbouring former bus station of New Zealand Railways Road Services, designed in 1939 by James Hodge White (1896-1970), was acquired. This structure, one of Dunedin's more notable examples of art deco architecture, is now used to house vintage transport and related machinery. It lies directly to the south of the old museum, to which it was linked in 1994 by a concourse designed by Francis Whittaker. In 1995 the directorship of the museum was combined with that of the Dunedin Public Art Gallery, an innovation which was controversial. In 2008 this was reversed and the city council re-established the museum's separate directorship.

In 2006 the city council decided to proceed with extensive additions to the north and east of the Burnside complex to consolidate the collections on a single site and to provide better conditions for their storage and exhibition. Further extensions were planned, including a controversial observation tower at the museum's northern end but this was subsequently dropped from the redevelopment plan.

On 4 April 2008 a burst water main caused flooding and damage to the museum costing $45,000 to repair. No artefacts were found to be irreparable.

The museum's E class Fairlie steam locomotive Josephine is popular. It is the oldest preserved steam locomotive in New Zealand, dating from 1872, and when it was saved for preservation in the late 1920s, it became New Zealand's first preserved locomotive, decades before the heritage movement truly began in this country. The museum also possesses the youngest preserved steam locomotive in New Zealand, J^{A} 1274. It entered service in December 1956 and was both the last steam locomotive built by the New Zealand Railways Department (at Dunedin's Hillside Workshops) and the last new steam locomotive built for operation on the national network. It was officially withdrawn in November 1971 and was saved for preservation, moving to the museum a few years later.

Among the museum's collection of paintings are works by the surveyor of Dunedin Charles Kettle, the surveyor John Buchanan, artist Alfred Henry O'Keeffe and a notable group by George O'Brien. The museum also houses a research centre and is home to an extensive collection of photographs of European pioneers. A bust of a former Provincial Superintendent James Macandrew is located outside the Burnside building.

== Current display ==
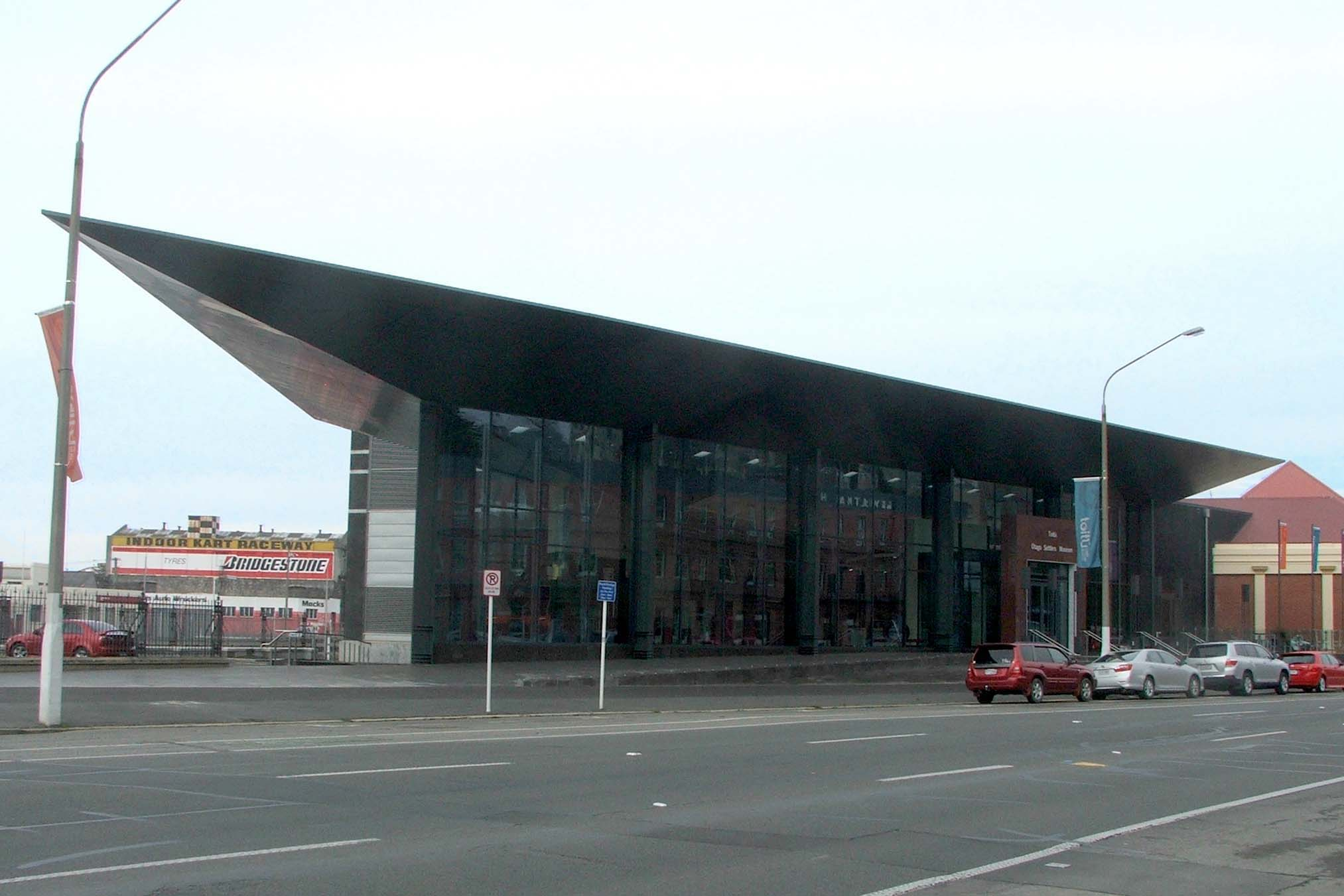
The new entrance wing to the gallery - the Josephine Foyer - abuts the northern end of the old complex.

The museum underwent extensive renovations during 2011 and 2012, reopening to the public with a new name, Toitū Otago Settlers Museum in December 2012. A competition had been put to the community to submit possible complementary names for the new building, with the name Toitu suggested and submitted by the Holmes family. This name, meaning "to remain unchanged", represents the area of water, land, and sky of this particular area, and was the name of a former stream which ran close to where the museum now stands.

The improvements include a new structure attached to the northern end of the former building and increased exhibition size. The north wing includes a new main entrance, gift shop, and cafe, as well as housing Josephine, and is officially called the Josephine Foyer. A separate new structure to the north of the museum houses J^{A} 1274 (locomotive).

The revamped display now tells the story of Dunedin and its surrounding districts chronologically from the first encounters between southern Māori and Europeans in the late 18th century up to the present day, with exhibits complemented by the addition of fully interactive computer displays. The two Burnside wings detail the history of the region from pre-European times, through the Otago gold rush to the end of the nineteenth century, and include costumes, dioramas, and multimedia displays. The popular Smith Gallery (often referred to as the Portrait Room) has been retained, its walls covered in painted and photographed portraits of the city and region's early settlers. A new computerised display in the centre of the room allows visitors to find out information about the individuals depicted.

The former entrance link between this area and the former bus depot has been turned into a research centre and military history display with a Roll of Honour remembering all those from Dunedin who have died at war. Fittingly, this places it close to the Dunedin Cenotaph, which sits at the centre of Queen's Gardens, immediately outside the museum. The former bus depot features twentieth century artefacts. This includes a transport hall containing historic vehicles ranging from drays to a trolley bus, and a section dedicated to digital technology which includes some of the city's first computer equipment, including an ICT 1301 mainframe (one of only four in existence worldwide). A further section highlights Dunedin's creative and broadcasting history, including permanent displays relating to the city's pioneering radio and television industry and the Dunedin sound music scene. The former bus depot's Art Deco entrance hall has been left intact within this wing.

The interior of the revamped Toitū Otago Settlers Museum
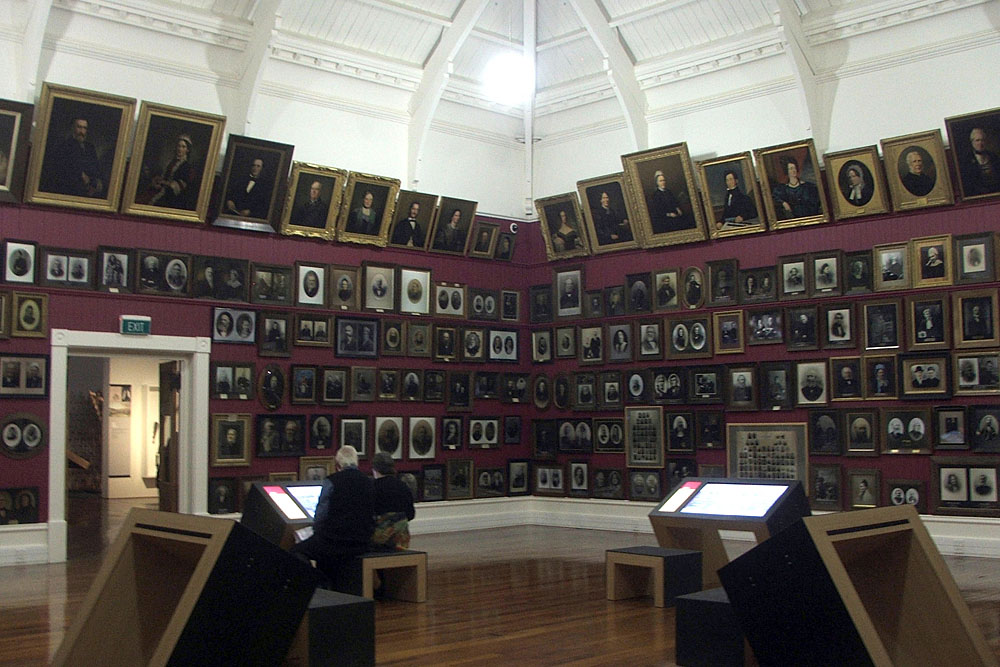
The Smith Portrait Gallery.

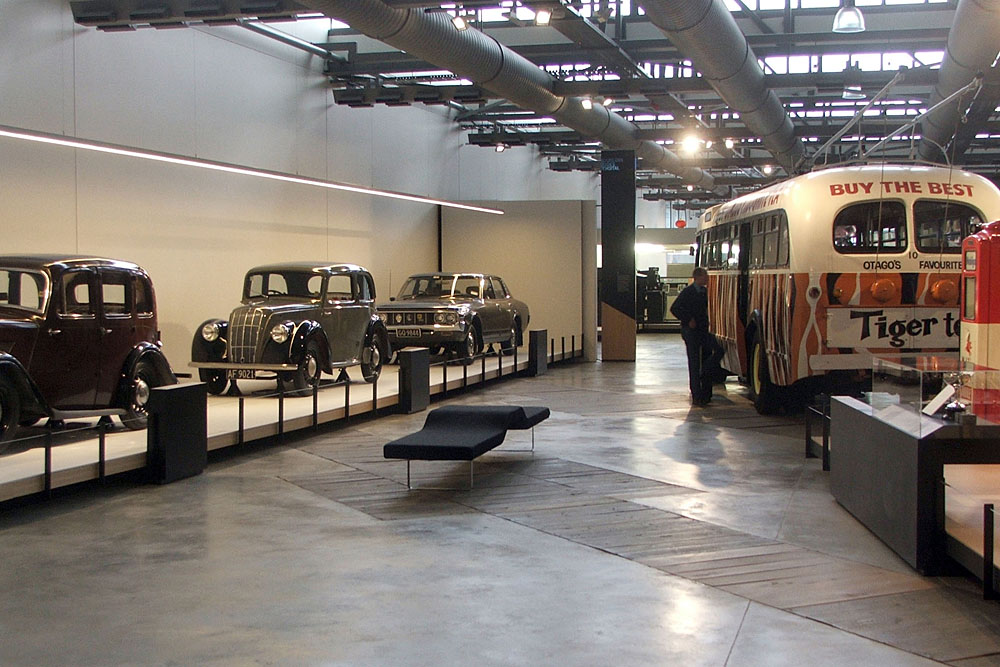
Part of the transport hall, featuring a city trolley bus and cars.

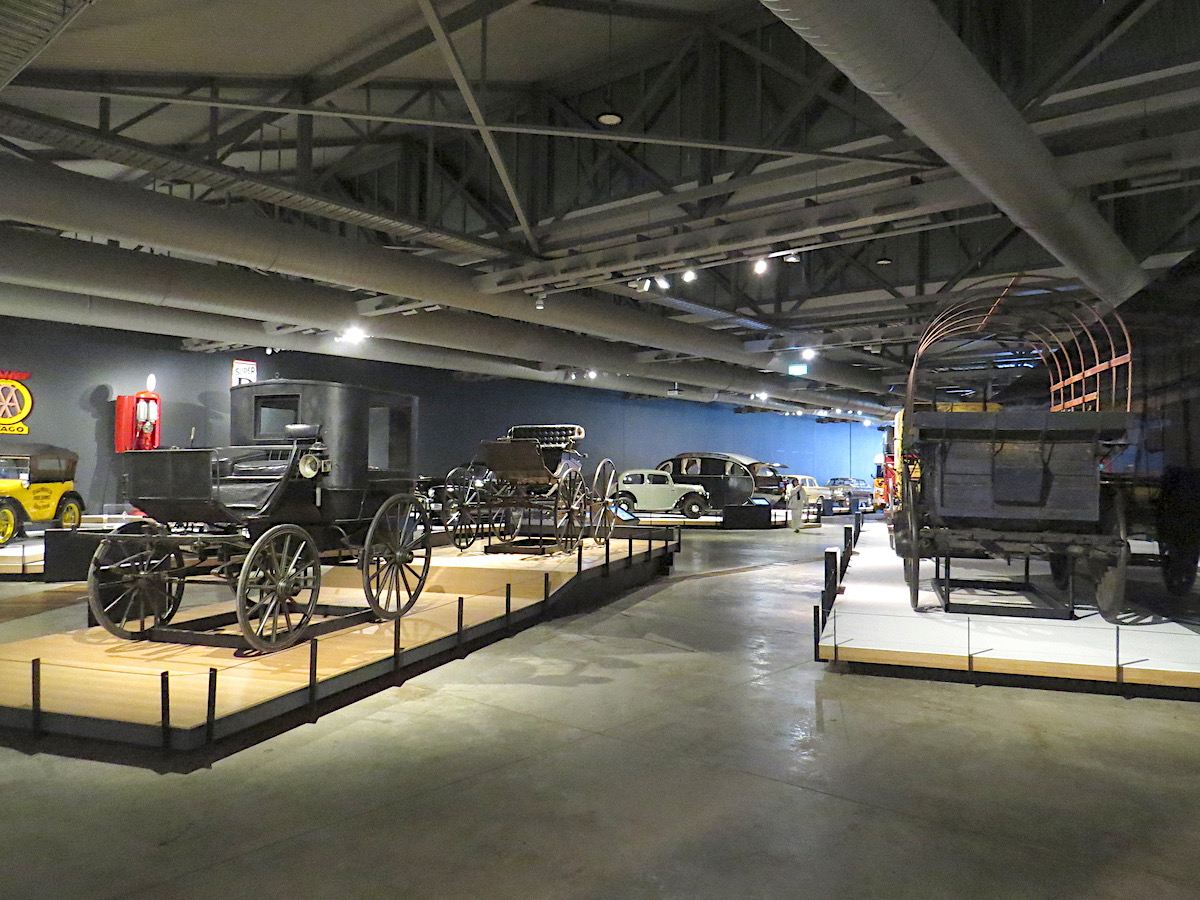
Transport hall

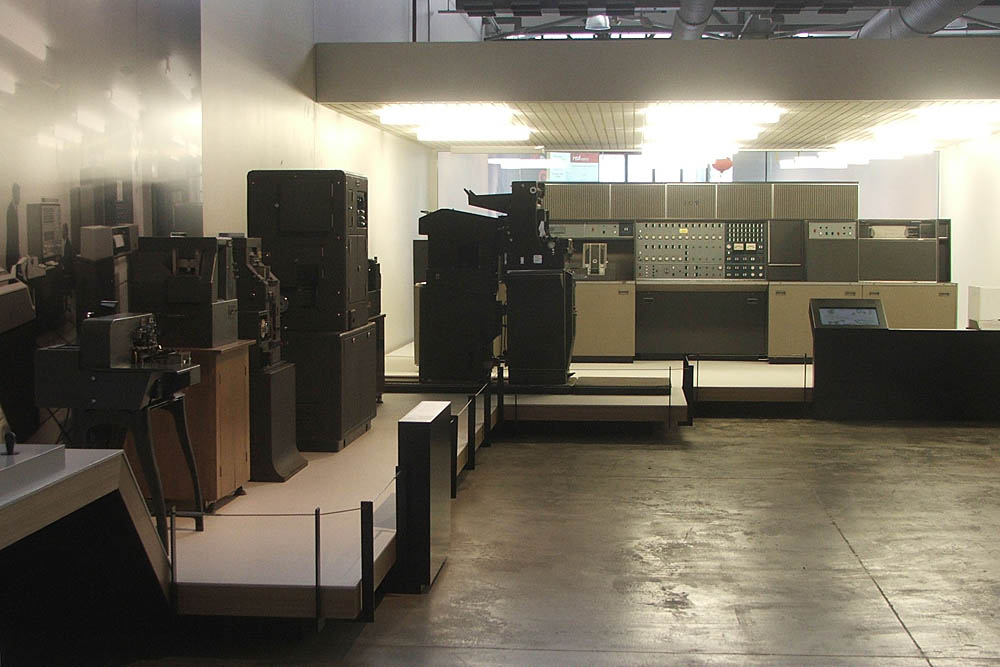
Early digital and computer technology is featured at the museum's southern end.

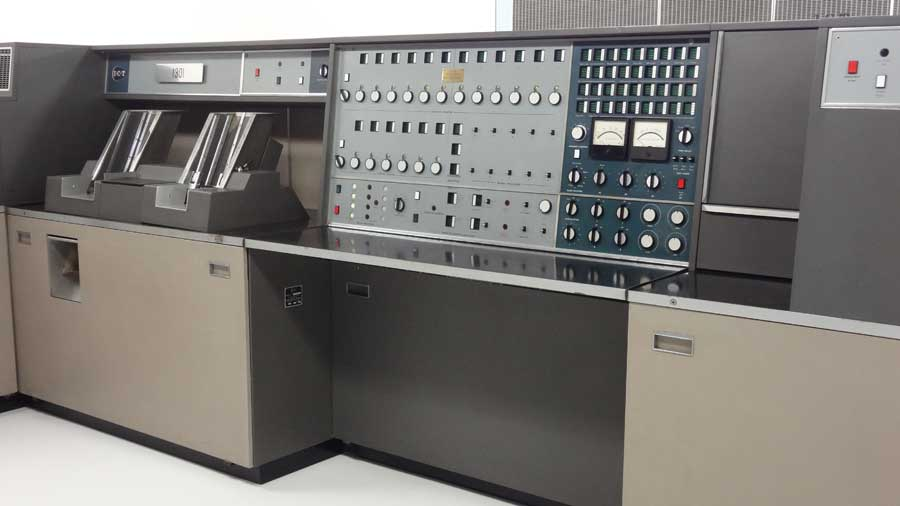
The museum's ICT 1301 computer display.

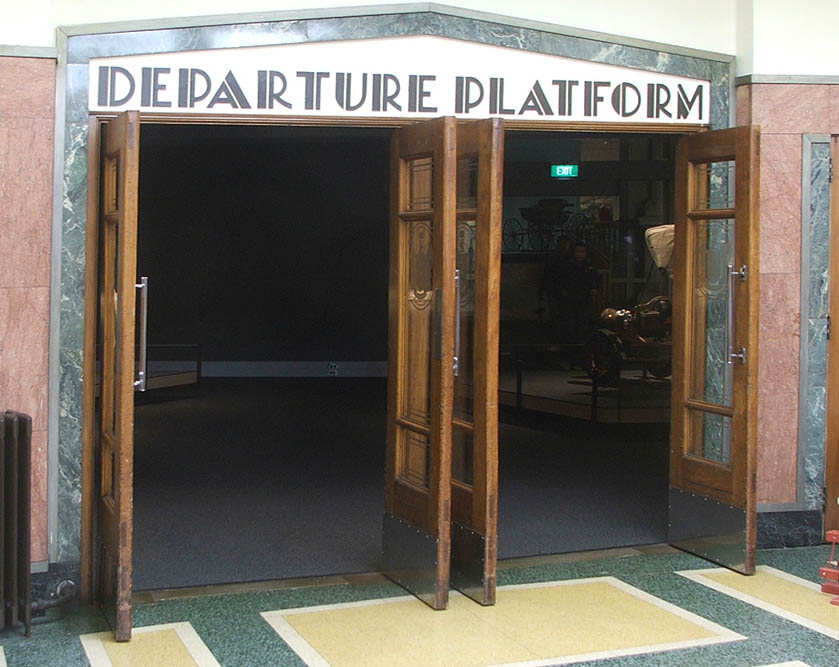
The former bus depot's Art Deco waiting room has been restored to its original condition.

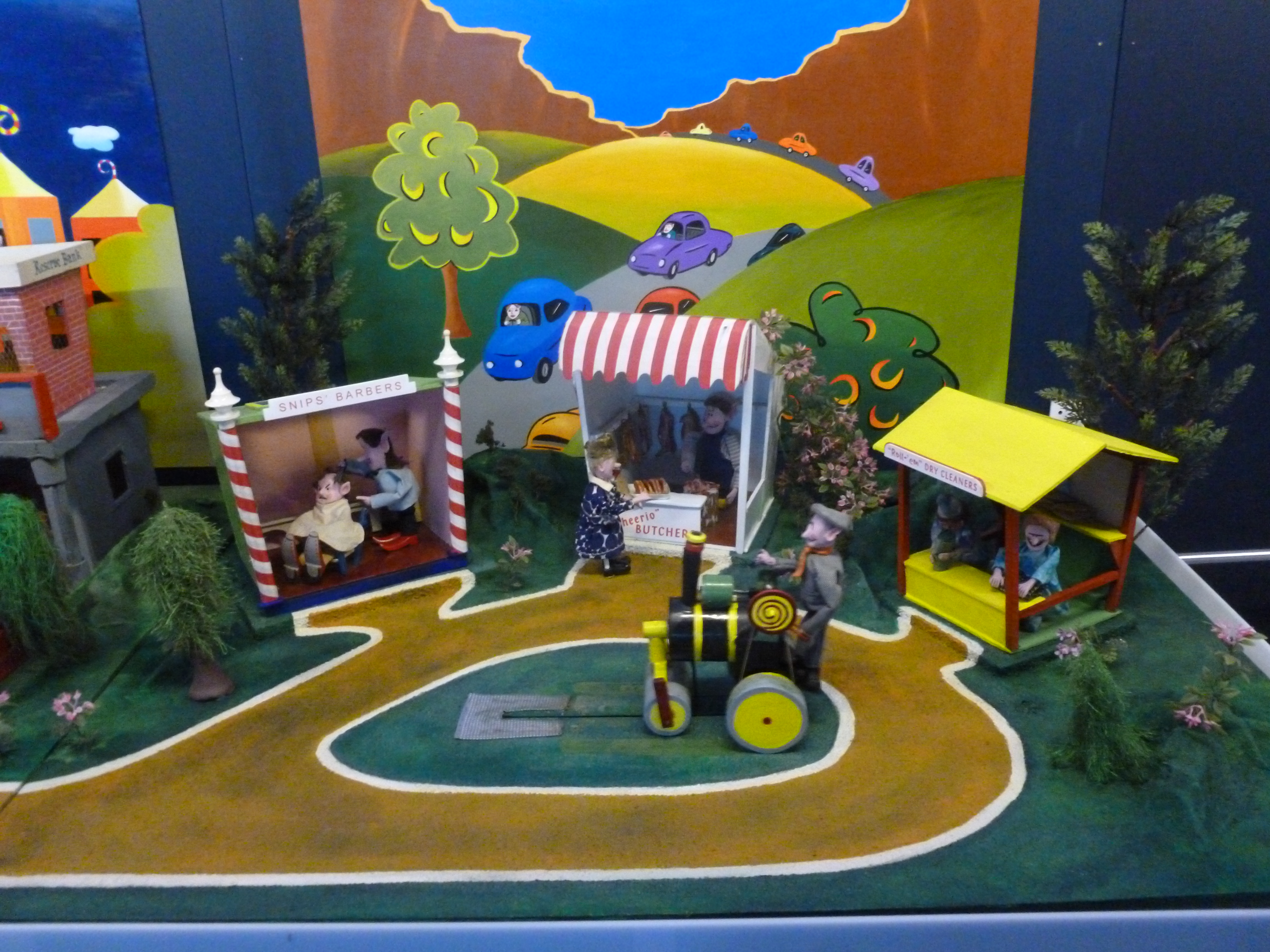
Pixie town animatronic models, made by Frederick Nelson Jones, from the D.I.C. (department store).

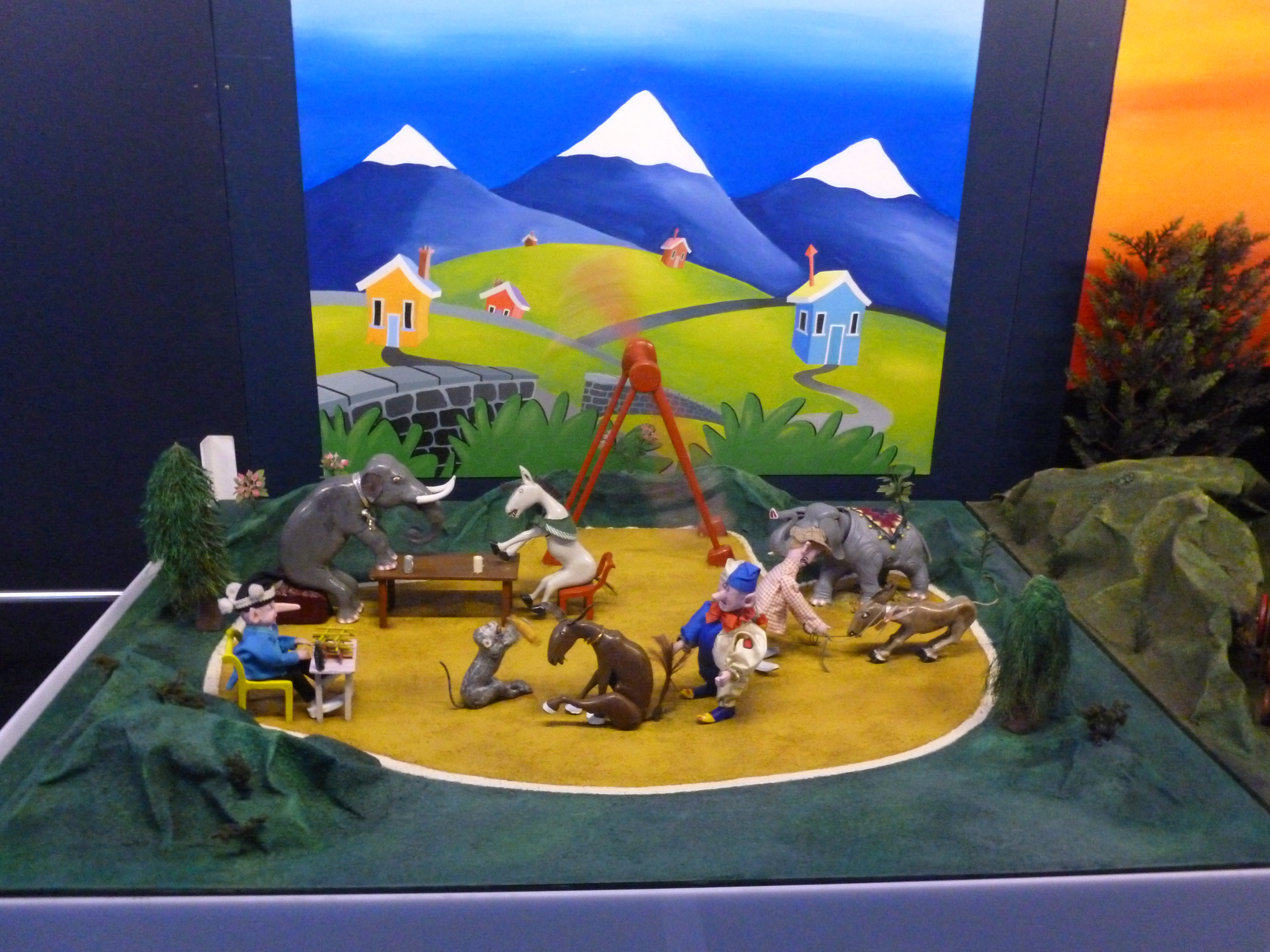
Pixie town animatronic models from the D.I.C. (department store).

== Chinese garden ==
A traditional Chinese garden has been constructed on land immediately behind the museum's southern wing, and opened to the public on 8 July 2008. It is one of very few such gardens outside China. This garden is partly a gift of Dunedin's sister city, Shanghai, and has been designed in consultation with landscape architects from that city.

== Sources ==
- Brosnahan, S.G. (1998) To Fame Undying The Otago Settlers Association and its Museum 1898-1998 Dunedin, NZ: Otago Settlers Association. ISBN 0-473-05211-3.
