= List of historic places in Dunedin =

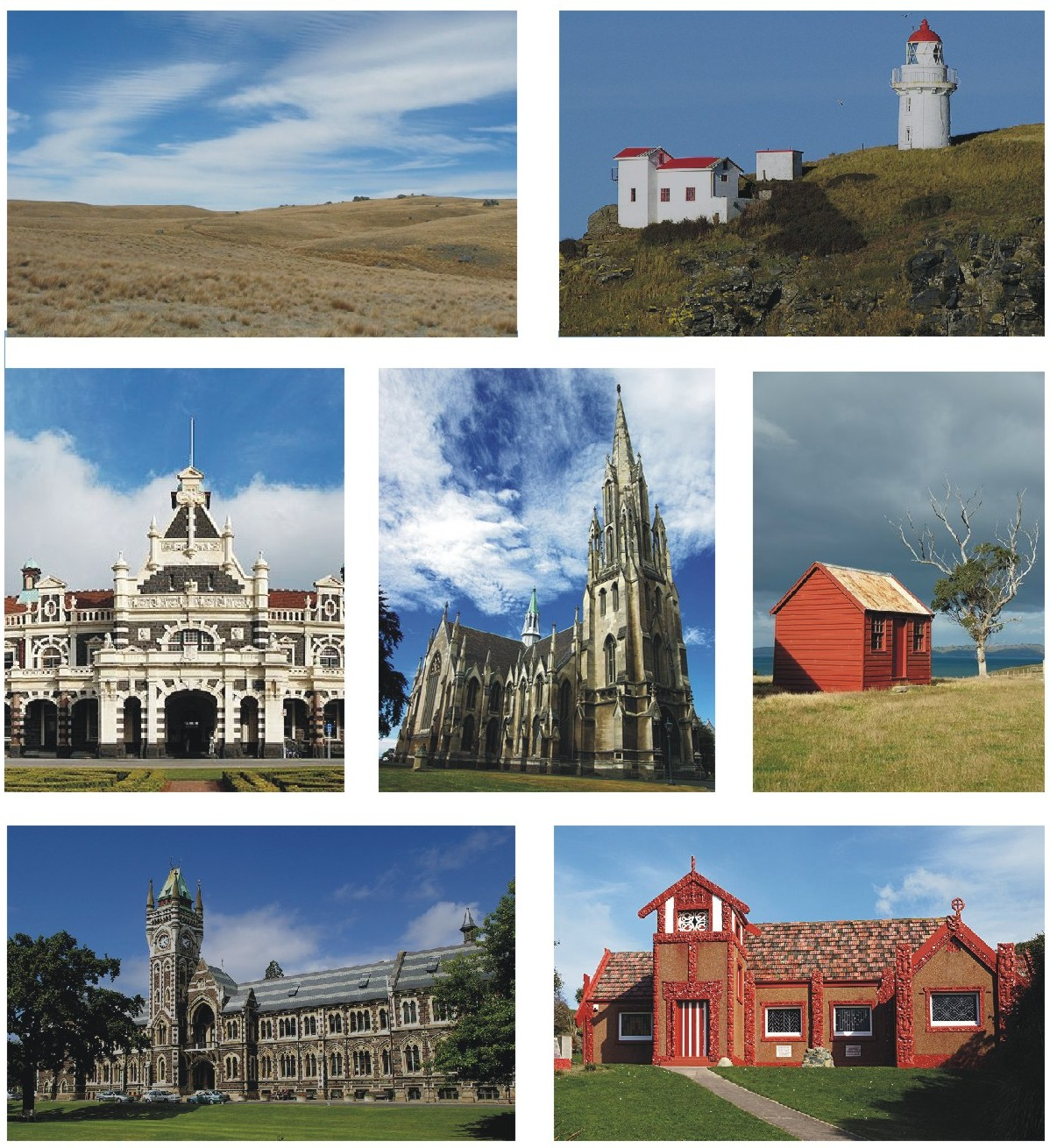
Montage of Dunedin heritage (from top left): The Old Dunston Road, Taiaroa Head Lighthouse, the Railway Station, First Church, Matanaka Farm, University of Otago and Otakou Maori Memorial Methodist Church.

This list of historic places in Dunedin covers all historical areas, places and buildings on the New Zealand Heritage List / Rārangi Kōrero that fall entirely or in part within Dunedin City. It also covers places of local importance or historical notability.

Māori settled in Otago relatively soon after reaching New Zealand, and the Dunedin area was a major whaling centre and site of early European colonisation. The building boom from the gold rush of the 1860s, coupled with the relative stagnation of the region's population in the 20th century, has led to the preservation of many old structures and sites. Dunedin City is 255 km² in area, covering Otago Harbour, the Taieri Plains and the tussock-covered mountains near Middlemarch. Some of the historical sites listed here are therefore, rural in nature.

Exceptional historical places are included in the national register (administered by Heritage New Zealand) in five groups: historic places (Category 1 and 2), historic areas, Wāhi Tūpuna (practical sites), Wāhi Tapu (spiritual sites) and Wāhi Tapu areas. As of November 2018, there are 827 listings in Otago, of which 207 are Category 1 historic places. This list covers all historical areas, places, and buildings on the New Zealand Heritage List that fall entirely or in part within Dunedin City. It also covers places of local importance or historical notability. The Huriawa Pā site (fortified village) and Toitu Tauraka Waka are designated as a Wāhi Tapu Area and Wāhi Tūpuna, respectively.

The Dunedin City Council also maintains a Heritage Register of buildings included in the national register and those which add to the character of the city. The additions to the national register are based on an assessment of the significance of values which are outlined in the Significance Assessment Guidelines (2019).

== Areas of exceptional cultural and historical importance ==
Photo	Name	Street	Suburb/Locality	Date of construction	Components	Type
	Burlington Street Historic Area	Burlington Street	Central city	1868–1920s	First Church, Burns Hall, Commerce Building, RSA Building, and Garrison Hall	Historic Area
	Dunedin Harbourside Historic Area	Wharf Street and environs	Central city	1863 (Start of land reclamation)	The port and associated businesses, park	Historic Area
	Goat Island / Rakiriri Historic Area		Otago Harbour (lower)	1870s (construction of single men's quarters)	Foundations of the quarantine station, reserve	Historic Area
	Huriawa Peninsula		Karitane	c. 1750	Te Pā a Te Wera, reserve, and archaeological sites	Wāhi Tapu
	Pilot Station Historic Area	Pilot Street	Aramoana	1912–13	Former Harbour Pilot's house and offices (currently holiday homes)	Historic Area
	Quarantine Island / Kamau Taurua Historic Area		Otago Harbour (lower)	1863–1924 (Quarantine Station)	Restored quarantine station, farm, and cemetery	Historic Area
	Toitu Tauraka	Rattray Street	The Exchange	From Māori settlement to the start of land reclamation in 1863	Landing site for travel between Otago Harbour and Central Otago, and trading site between Otakou and Dunedin	Wāhi Tūpuna
	Windle Settlement Workers' Dwellings Historic Area	Rosebery and Newport Streets	Belleknowes	1906–07	Residential area (20 houses)	Historic Area

== Historic places and buildings ==
=== Heritage New Zealand Register, Category I ===
Photo	Name	Street	Suburb/Locality	Date of construction	Original (current) use
	Abbotsford Farm Steading	404 Allanton Road	Outram	1871 (designed)	Farm
	All Saints' Church (Anglican)	786 Cumberland Street	Dunedin North	1865	Church (in use)
	Bank of New Zealand (Former)	200 Main Road and Kildare Street	Waikouaiti	1869	Bank (Residential)
	Bank of New Zealand Building	205 Princes Street	Central city	1879–83	Bank (Commercial businesses)
	Bishopgrove	16 Patmos Avenue	Glenleith	1872	Residential
	Bishopscourt (Columba College)	399 Highgate	Maori Hill	1872	Residential
	Cargill's Castle	111D Cliffs Road	Saint Clair	1876	Residential (ruins)
	Cargill's Monument	Princes Street	The Exchange	1864	Monument
	Carisbrook Turnstile Building and former site of Carisbrook	18 Neville Street	Caversham	1926 (Demolition of stands 2012–13)	Stadium entrance (vacant)
	Caversham Presbyterian Church	61 Thorn Street	Caversham	1883	Church (in use)
	Chingford Stables	411 Chingford Park	North East Valley	early 1870s	Stable buildings (Private venue)
	Corstorphine House	23A Milburn Street	Corstorphine	1863	Private residence
	Cottesbrook Station Complex	105 Moonlight Road	Middlemarch	1860s (early)	Farmstead and farm buildings
	Crown Milling Company Building	Manor Place	City Rise	1880 (approximate date)	Company offices and mill
	Daisy Bank	12 Royal Terrace	Maori Hill	1890s	Residential
	Dental School	280–310 Great King Street	Dunedin North	1961	Tertiary institution
	Dental School (former)	Great King Street	Dunedin North	1926	Tertiary institution
	Donaghy's Rope Walk	64 Bradshaw Street	South Dunedin	1920 (replaced 1878 building)	Rope making industry
	Duddingston	School Road	Mosgiel	1865	Residence
	Dunedin Athenaeum and Mechanics' Institute	2–24 The Octagon	Central city	1870	Library (Library plus commercial offices and art space)
	Dunedin Gasworks Exhauster and Boiler House	Braemar Street	South Dunedin	1907	Gasworks (Museum)
	Dunedin Law Courts	1 Stuart Street	Central city	1902	Courtrooms
	Dunedin Prison (Former)	2 Castle Street	Central city	1895–1897	Prison (Museum)
	Dunedin Railway Station, Platform & Gates	Anzac Square	Central city	1905	Railway Station (still in use, also gallery, New Zealand Sports Hall of Fame, and restaurant)
	Dunedin Synagogue (Former)	29 Moray Place	Central city	1864	Synagogue (Residential)
	Empire Hotel	396 Princes Street	Central city	1879	Hotel and public house
	Equitable Insurance Association Building (Phoenix House)	45-45B Queens Gardens	Queens Gardens	1885	Commercial offices
	Exhibition Art Gallery (Former)	40 Logan Park Drive, Logan Park	Dunedin North	1926	Art gallery (Sports institute)
	Ferntree Lodge	14 Ferntree Drive	Halfway Bush	1849	Residential
	First Church of Otago (Presbyterian)	410 Moray Place	Central city	1867–75	Church (in use)
	Fitting Shop (Smithy or Purifier House)	Braemar Street	South Dunedin		Gasworks (Museum)
	Fort Taiaroa	Harington Point Road	Taiaroa Head	1880–	Gun emplacement and magazine (vacant)
	Former Trinity Methodist Church	231 Stuart Street	Central city	1869	Church (Theatre from 1977 to 2018, now vacant)
	Garrison Hall and Orderly Building (Former)	8 Dowling Street	The Exchange	1877	Army garrison (Commercial offices)
	Gasholder of 1879	Braemar Street	South Dunedin	1879	Gasworks (Museum)
	Globe Theatre	104 London Street	City Rise	1961	Theatre
	Guardian Royal Exchange Building	7–9 Liverpool Street	Warehouse Precinct	1882	Commercial offices (Residential)
	Hanover Street Baptist Church	65 Hanover Street	Central city	1912	Church (vacant)
	Hocken Building (Former), now known as the Richardson Building	Leith Walk	Dunedin North	1977–79	University building
	Holy Trinity Church (Anglican)	1 Scotia Street and Grey Street	Port Chalmers	1874	Church (in use)
	Horse Sale Yard (Former)	35 Maclaggan Street	Central city	1889	Warehouse (in use)
	Hudson's House (Former)	32 Tweed Street	Roslyn	1870–79	Residential (in use)
	Invermay Agriculture Research Centre	Factory Road	Wingatui	1862	Laboratory (residential)
	Iona Church	24 Mount Street	Port Chalmers	1883	Church (in use)
	Janefield	222–224 Factory Road	Mosgiel	1851	Farmhouse
	Kempthorne Prosser Building	26,32–34 Stafford Street	City Rise	1901	Pharmacy laboratories and offices (Commercial offices and retail)
	King Edward Technical College (Former)	291 Stuart Street	City Rise	1913	Tertiary Institute
	Knox Church (Presbyterian)	453–463 George Street	Central city	1872–76	Church (in use)
	Larnach Castle	Camp Road	Otago Peninsula	1871–76	Residential
	Larnach Castle Cupola	Camp Road	Otago Peninsula	1930s	Garden feature
	Larnach Castle Stables	Camp Road	Otago Peninsula	1874	Stables (Museum)
	Leithendel	367 Malvern Street	Glenleith	1865	Residential (in use)
	'Linden' house (Dhargyey Buddhist Centre)	22 Royal Terrace	inner city	1865	Residence (Buddhist community facility)
	Lindo Ferguson Building	Great King Street	Dunedin North	1927	Medical school
	Lisburn House	15 Lisburn Avenue	Caversham	1865	Residential
	Long Beach Midden	Beach Road	Long Beach	1480 AD ± 175 (excavation in 1977)	Midden, archaic to classic Maori
	Manono	84 London Street	Central city	1908	Residential
	Matanaka Farm	51 Matanaka Road	Waikouaiti	1843	Farm (Museum and farm)
	Mathiesons Farm Steading	121 Centre Road	Otago Peninsula	1870–82	Farm (in use)
	Melrose	384 Highgate	Roslyn	1878	Residential (in use)
	Mosgiel Woollen Factory	Factory Road	Mosgiel	1860–62	Factory (in use)
	Municipal Chambers	38 The Octagon	Central city	1880	Town Hall
	National Bank of New Zealand	193 Princes Street	The Exchange	1912	Bank (Commercial offices)
	Consultancy House	7 Bond and 14 Crawford Streets	Warehouse Precinct	1908–10	Offices (in use)
	New Zealand Insurance Company Building (Former)	49–51 Queens Gardens	Central city	1886	Commercial offices (Commercial offices and public house)
	Northern Cemetery	40 Lovelock Avenue	Dunedin North	1872	Cemetery
	Former NZ Clothing Company Limited Building (Milford House)	20 Dowling Street	The Exchange	1883	Offices (Art gallery and studios, retail businesses)
	NZ Railways Road Services Building (Former)	35 Queens Gardens	Central city	1939	Bus depot (Part of Toitū Otago Settlers Museum)
	Olveston	42 Royal Terrace and Cobden Street	Maori Hill	1904–07	Residence (Museum)
	Otago Boys' High School Central Block	18 Arthur Street	City Rise	1882–85	School
	Otago Girls' High School Main Block	41 Tennyson Street	City Rise	1910	School
	Otago Harbour Seawalls	Portobello, Ravensbourne, and Aramoana Roads	Otago Harbour	1865–80	Retaining walls (in use)
	Otago Museum	419 Great King and Cumberland Streets	Dunedin North	1877	Museum (in use)
	Otakou Maori Memorial Methodist Church	Tamatea Rd	Otakou	1941	Church (in use)
	Pelichet Bay Infectious Diseases Hospital (Former)	3 Butts Road	Logan Park, Dunedin North	1908	Hospital (residential)
	Port Chalmers Municipal Building	George Street and 1 Grey Street	Port Chalmers	1889	Town Hall
	Port Chalmers Post Office (Former)	19 Beach Street	Port Chalmers	1877	Post Office (museum)
	Puketahi	Shore Street	Andersons Bay	circa 1900	Storage (Vacant)
	Regent Theatre	17 The Octagon	Central city	1928 (interior); exterior 1890s	Theatre and Cinema (Theatre only)
	Ritchie Residence (Former)	26 and 28A Heriot Row	Maori Hill	1914	Residential (in use)
	Robert Burns Statue	The Octagon	Central city	1887	Monument (in use)
	Robert Lord Writers' Cottage	3 Titan Street	Dunedin North	1909	Residential (in use)
	Robertson Stone Walls (Clifton)	Highcliff Road	Highcliff, Otago Peninsula	1896	Farm walls (in use)
	Ross Creek Earth Dam	Ross Creek Water Reserve	Glenleith	1865–67	Water Reserve (in use)
	Ross Creek Valve Tower	Ross Creek Water Reserve	Glenleith	1865–67	Water Reserve
	Saint Andrew's Presbyterian Church and Warden's Cottage (Former)	64–66 Melville Street	City Rise	1870	Church (in use)
	Saint Dominic's Priory (Former)	31 Smith Street	City Rise	1877	Ecclesiastical buildings
	Saint James Theatre	Moray Place	Central city	1928	Cinema (in use)
	Saint John Ambulance Building	17 York Place	Central city	1937–38	Ambulance base, medical centre
	Saint John the Evangelist Church (Anglican)	94 Beach Street	Waikouaiti	1858	Church (in use)
	Saint Joseph's Cathedral (Catholic)	288 Rattray and Smith Streets	City Rise	1878–86	Church (in use)
	Saint Matthew's Church (Anglican)	28 Hope and Stafford Streets	City Rise	1874	Church (in use)
	Saint Paul's Cathedral and Belfry (Anglican)	36 The Octagon	Centre city	1916–19	Church (in use)
	Sandymount Lime Kilns	Sandymount Road	Otago Peninsula	mid-1860s	Lime Kilns (ruins)
	Savoy Restaurant (Formerly Haynes Building)	50 Princes Street	Central city	1914	Restaurant and commercial businesses
	Seacliff Lunatic Asylum Site	22, 36 Russell Road and Coast Road	Seacliff	1879–84	Psychiatric Hospital (Private park and ruins)
	Southern Cemetery	18 South Road	Kensington	1857–58	Cemetery (limited use from 1980)
	Southern Cross Hotel (Former Grand Hotel portion)	118 High Street	The Exchange	1883	Hotel (Hotel and casino)
	Springfield	949 Highcliff Road	Highcliff, Otago Peninsula	1865	Restaurant (in use)
	Donald M. Stuart Memorial	Queens Gardens	Central city	1898	
	Stuart Street Terraced Houses	199–223 Stuart Street and 118–120 Moray Place	Central city	1901	Residential and doctors' offices (Retail premises and residential)
	Taiaroa Head Lighthouse	Taiaroa Head	Otago Peninsula	1864–65	Lighthouse
	The Hermitage (Former)	521 George Street	Centre city	1881	Residential (in use)
	Threave	367 High Street	City Rise	1903	Residential (in use)
	Truby King Harris Hospital (Former)	79 Every Street	Andersons Bay	1938	Hospital (Residential)
	Union Steam Ship Company Offices and Stores (Former)	49 Water, 135 Cumberland, and 57 Vogel Streets	Warehouse Precinct	1883	Commercial offices
	University of Otago Allen Hall Theatre and Archway	Union Street and Leith Walk	Dunedin North	1914	University (in use)
	University of Otago Clocktower Building	364 Leith Walk	Dunedin North	1879	University (in use)
	University of Otago Geology Block	Leith Walk	Dunedin North	1878	University (in use)
	University of Otago Home Science Block	Union Street	Dunedin North	1919	University (in use)
	University of Otago Marama Hall	Leith Walk	Dunedin North	1923	University (in use)
	University of Otago Professorial Houses	St David Street	Dunedin North	1878–79	University (in use)
	University of Otago School of Mines	Leith Walk	Dunedin North	1909	University (in use)
	University of Otago Staff Club	Leith Walk and Castle Street	Dunedin North	1907	University (in use)
	Wains Hotel	310 Princes Street	The Exchange	1879	Hotel and public house
	Woodside	4 Lovelock Avenue	Dunedin North	1876	Residence
	Old Dunstan Road	Old Dunstan Road	Clarks Junction to Galloway Flat (note: only partly within Dunedin city limits)	1861 (construction of road)	Road (in use)

=== Heritage New Zealand Register, Category II ===
Photo	Name	Street	Suburb/Locality	Date of construction	Original (current) use
	Allbell Chambers	127 Stuart Street	Central city	1909–10	Offices (in use)
	Allied Press Ltd Building (Formerly Evening Star Building)	52 Stuart Street	Central city	1928	Offices (in use)
	Alva House	9 Alva Street	Mornington	1886	Residential (in use)
	Alyth	34 Royal Terrace	City Rise	1874–75	Residential (in use)
	Andersons Bay Presbyterian Church (Former)	76 Silverton Street	Shiel Hill	1914	Church (vacant)
	Aorangi	1 Tui Street and St Leonards Drive	Saint Leonards	1907	Residential
	Australia and New Zealand Bank Building	159 Stuart Street	Central city	1882	Bank (hotel)
	Balmoral	94 Holyhead Street	Outram	1857	Residential (in use)
	Bank of New Zealand Building (Former)	1 George and Grey Streets	Port Chalmers	1880	Bank (retail premises)
	Bank of Otago	5 Mountford Street	Outram	1869	Bank (house)
	Baptist Sunday School Building	63 Hanover Street	Central city	1880	School ()
	Bellfield	Main South Road	East Taieri	1854	Residential (in use)
	Bluestone Retaining Wall	369–371 George Street	Central city	1863	Wall
	Cable House	829-829a Cumberland Street	Dunedin North	1859	Residential (in use)
	Cadbury Schweppes Hudson Limited Buildings	280 Cumberland Street	Central city		Factory (vacant)
	Camelot Restaurant	412A George Street	Central city		Retail
	Catholic Church of the Sacred Heart of Jesus	89 North Road	North East Valley	1891–92	Church (in use)
	Catholic Church of the Sacred Heart of Jesus	9137 Eton and Woburn Streets	Hyde	1893–94	Church (in use)
	Dunedin Cenotaph	Queens Gardens	Central city	1924–27	Memorial (in use)
	Central Police Station (Former), Dunbar House	21 Dunbar and High Streets	Central city	1891	Police Station (Offices)
	Chick's Hotel	2 Mount Street	Port Chalmers	1878	Hotel (Recording studio)
	Chief Post Office	283 Princes Street	Central city	1937	Post Office (Hotel)
	Clarion Building	282–292 Princes Street	Central city	1874	Offices (in use)
	Claverton	30 Royal Terrace	City Rise	1877	Residential (in use)
	Clifton Villa (Former)	17 Graham Street	City Rise	1858	Residential (in use)
	Commerce Building	Dowling and Burlington Streets	Central city	1879	Offices
	Conway Residence (Former)	59 Ann Street	Roslyn	1876	Residential (in use)
	Corstorphine House (Conservatory)	Milburn Avenue	Corstorphine		Conservatory
	Corstorphine House (Gates and Walls)	Milburn Avenue	Corstorphine		Gates and walls
	Corstorphine House (Gazebo)	Milburn Avenue	Corstorphine		Gazebo
	Corstorphine House (Stables)	Milburn Avenue	Corstorphine	1863	Stables
	Crown Clothing Company Building (Former)	398 George Street	Central city	1900	Clothing factory (Bank)
	Dandie Dinmont Hotel (Former) "The White House"	166 Portobello Road and Doon Street	Waverley	1880	Residential (vacant)
	Dowling Street Steps	Princes and Dowling Streets	Central city	1926–27	Steps (in use)
	Dr Colquhoun's Residence and Consulting Rooms (Former)	218 High Street	City Rise	1884	Residential and trade (in use)
	Dr Stephenson's Residence (Former)	201 High Street	City Rise	1898	Residential (in use)
	Dundas Street Methodist Church and Sunday School Hall (Former)	50 Dundas Street	Dunedin North	1979	Church (Theatre)
	Dundas Street Terrace Houses	62–86 Dundas Street	Dunedin North	prior to 1881	Residential (in use)
	Dunedin Club	Melville Street	Fernhill, City Rise	1867	Club rooms (in use)
	Dunedin Fire Station	St Andrews and Castle Streets	Central city	1931	Fire Station (in use)
	Dunedin North Post Office (Former)	361 Great King Street	Dunedin North	1878	Post office (annex of Otago Museum)
	Dunedin Public Library (Former)	110 Moray Place	Central city		Public Library (Commercial premises)
	Dunedin Town Hall and Concert Chamber	Moray Place	Central city	1929	Town Hall (in use)
	Dunrobin	Main South Road	East Taieri		Residential (in use)
	Dwelling	Aramoana Road (Pt Section 23, Blk I, Lower Harbour West SD)	Deborah Bay		Residential (Ruin)
	Dwelling	Aramoana Road (Pt Section 23, Blk I, Lower Harbour West SD)	Deborah Bay		Residential (Ruin)
	East Taieri Presbyterian Church	12A Cemetery Road	East Taieri	1869–70	Church (in use)
	Excelsior Hotel (Former – now Guest House)	31 Dowling Street	The Exchange		Hotel (Accommodation and retail)
	The Exchange Court Façade (Former) and Thomson, Bridger and Company Façade (Former)	194 Princes Street	The Exchange	1880–1906	Retail (in use)
	F. W. Petre's House (Former)	20 Cliffs Road	Saint Clair	1880s	Residential (in use)
	Faringdon Villa	29 Fitzroy Street	Caversham	1882	Residential (in use)
	Fisken & Associates Ltd Building (Former BNZ)	Pitt and London Streets	Central city	1927	Bank (Buddhist centre)
	Fitness Centre Building	77 Stuart Street	Central city	1910	Offices (in use)
	Flagstaff	Aurora Terrace	Port Chalmers	1910	Flagpole (in use)
	Fountain (Wolf Harris)	Dunedin Botanic Gardens	Gardens Corner	1890	Fountain (in use)
	George Street Bridge	George Street	Woodhaugh	1903	Bridge (in use)
	Gladstone Terrace of Houses	38–50 Melville Street	City Rise	1880	Residential (in use)
	Glenallen	Old Henley Road	Otokia	1858	Residential (in use)
	Glenavon Church (Methodist)	7 Chambers Street	North East Valley	1906	Church (in use)
	Glenfalloch	Portobello Road	Macandrew Bay, Otago Peninsula	1872	Residential (in use)
	Grants Braes Farmhouse	131 Belford Street	Vauxhall	1867	Residential (in use)
	H. E. Shacklock Buildings	595–625 Princes Street	Central city	1870	Trade (in use)
	High Street School (Former) War Memorial and Gates	High and Alva Streets	City Rise	1926	Memorial
	H.M. Custom Wharf Office (Former)	18 Wharf and Fryatt Streets	Central city	1938	Office (in use)
	Hollybrook Cow Barn	Maungatua	Outram	1878	Barn
	Hollybrook Granary	Maungatua Road	Momona	1878	Granary
	Hollybrook Implement Shed	Maungatua Road	Momona	1878	Shed
	House	2 Fifield Street	Roslyn		Residential (in use)
	House	29 Tweed Street	Roslyn		Residential (in use)
	House	15 Takahe Terrace	Saint Leonards		Residential (in use)
	House	22 Rosebery Street	Belleknowes	1907	Residential (in use)
	House	2 William Street	City Rise	1864	Residential (in use)
	House	400 High Street	City Rise		Residential (in use)
	House	26 Carr Street	North East Valley	1904	Residential (in use)
	House	402 High Street	City Rise		Residential (in use)
	House	17 Takahe Terrace	Saint Leonards	1915	Residential (in use)
	House	425 High Street	City Rise	1898	Residential (in use)
	House	4 Willowbank	Dunedin North	1900	Residential (in use)
	House	689 Castle Street	Dunedin North	1880	Residential (in use)
	House	693 Castle Street	Dunedin North	1880	Residential (in use)
	House	47 Wickliffe Terrace	Port Chalmers		Residential (in use)
	House	29 Currie Street	Port Chalmers	1880	Residential (in use)
	House	31 Currie Street	Port Chalmers	1880	Residential (in use)
	House	26 Stevenson Avenue	Sawyers Bay		Residential (in use)
	House	8 Lundie Street	Roslyn	1859	Residential (in use)
	House	32 Rosebery Street	Belleknowes	1906–07	Residential (in use)
	House	4 Wardlaw Street	Musselburgh		Residential (in use)
	House	89 Warrender Street	Dunedin North	1864	Residential (in use)
	House	238 High Street	City Rise	1909	Residential (in use)
	House	1008 George Street	Dunedin North		Residential (in use)
	House	1014 George Street	Dunedin North		Residential (in use)
	House	17 Elder Street	City Rise	1875	Residential (in use)
	House	48–50 Fitzroy Street	Caversham		Residential (in use)
	House	603 George Street	Dunedin North	1900	Residential (in use)
	House	607 George Street	Dunedin North		Residential (in use)
	House	613 George Street	Dunedin North	1900	Residential (in use)
	House	619 George Street	Dunedin North		Residential (in use)
	House	637 George Street	Dunedin North	1900	Residential (in use)
	House	641 George Street	Dunedin North		Residential (in use)
	House	657 George Street	Dunedin North	1900	Residential (in use)
	House	16 Pitt Street	Central city	1898	Residential (in use)
	House	107A and B Stafford Street	City Rise		Residential (in use)
	House	4 Pitt Street	Central city	1885	Trade (residential)
	House	18 Haywood Street	Mornington	1858	Residential (in use)
	House	2 Willowbank	Dunedin North	1875	Residential (in use)
	House (A.H. Reed)	153 Glenpark Avenue	Mornington	1930	Residential (in use)
	House (Peter MacIntyre)	21 Gilmore Street	Wakari	1907	Residential (in use)
	House (Sir J. Fletcher)	727 Portobello Road	Broad Bay, Otago Peninsula	1909	Residential (museum since 1992)
	Hulme Court	52 Tennyson Street	City Rise		Residential (in use)
	Huxtable Residence (Former)	233 Highgate	Roslyn	1907	Residential (in use)
	Hyde School	9125 Eton Street	Hyde	1879	School (vacant)
	Imperial Building	Dowling and Lower High Streets	Central city		Commercial
	James Fletcher's Residence (Former)	276 High Street	City Rise	1923	Residential (in use)
	James Macandrew Statue	Cumberland Street	Central city	1891	Memorial (part of Toitū Otago Settlers Museum)
	Janefield (Barn)	Factory Road	Mosgiel	1851 (Janefield house Cat. 1)	Barn
	Johnstone Farmhouse	Ashton Street	Mosgiel		Residential (in use)
	Jopp Residence (Former)	37 Ann Street	Roslyn	1905	Residential (in use)
	Kaikorai Bank	29 Glenross Street	Kaikorai		Residential (in use)
	Kaituna	19 Graham Street	City Rise	1893	Residential (in use)
	Kawarau	204 Highgate	Roslyn	1900–01	Residential (in use)
	King Edward Picture Theatre (Former)	100 King Edward Street	South Dunedin	1914	Theatre (in use)
	Knox College Main Building	20 Arden Street	Opoho	1909 (school established)	University college (in use)
	Law Courts Hotel	53–65 Stuart Street	Central city		Accommodation (in use)
	Lee Stream Hotel (Former)	2107 SH87	Lee Stream	1862	Accommodation
	Lodge Maori	Ravensbourne Road	Ravensbourne		Masonic Lodge
	Logan Park Grandstand	Logan Park Drive	Logan Park, Dunedin North	1930	Sport grandstand (in use)
	Manor Place Conveniences	Intersection of Manor Place, Hope Street, Princes Street, Dunedin	Dunedin City	1912	Public conveniences (men only)
	Marinoto	Newington Avenue	Maori Hill	1878	Residential (Hospital)
	McPherson Residence (Former)	408 High Street	City Rise	1902	Residential (in use)
	Mews	628–634 Great King Street	Dunedin North		Residential (in use)
	Midden	Purakanui Bay Rec.Reserve	Between Long Beach and Blueskin Bay	1500s	Midden
	Midden	Harington Point Road	Harwood, Otago Peninsula		Midden
	Midden	Aramoana Road	Hamilton Bay		Midden
	Midden	Papanui Maori Reserve	Papanui Inlet, Otago Peninsula	1500s	Midden
	Midden (5713–5717)		Wickliffe Bay, Otago Peninsula	1500s	Midden
	Midden	Aramoana Road	Aramoana		Midden
	Midden	Tarewai Road	Taiaroa Head, Otago Peninsula		Midden
	Midden		Mouth of Papanui Inlet, Otago Peninsula	1500s	Midden
	Midden (European)		Deborah Bay		Midden
	Midden In Cave	Otakou Native Reserve	Pipkaretu Beach, Otago Peninsula		Midden
	Midden In Cave	Otakou Native Reserve	Wickliffe Bay, Otago Peninsula		Midden
	Midden/Occupation		Wickliffe Bay, Otago Peninsula		Midden
	Midden/Oven		Deborah Bay		Midden
	Midden/Work Floor	Brighton Recreational Reserve	Brighton		Work space (reserve)
	Middleton Lodge	37 Middleton Road	Kew		Residential (in use)
	Moata	434 High St	City Rise	1900	Residential (in use)
	Moray Place Congregational Church (Former)	81 Moray Place	Central city	1864	Church (accommodation)
	Moray Terrace	61–63 Moray Place	Central city	1880	Offices
	Moritzson Building	Bond and Jetty Streets	Warehouse Precinct	1878	Offices (in use)
	Mornington Post Office	Mailer and Brunel Streets	Mornington	1905	Post office (Commercial offices)
	Mornington Presbyterian Church (Former)	33 Brunel Street	Mornington	1880–81	Church (accommodation)
	National Airways Hangar (Former)	Stedman Road, Taieri Airfield	Wingatui	1936	Aircraft hangar
	National Bank Building	26 George Street	Port Chalmers		Bank (Retail premises)
	New Zealand Loan and Mercantile Agency Company Limited (Former)	31–33 Thomas Burns Street	Central city	1872	Offices
	Normanston	5 Robin Lane	Saint Leonards		Residential (in use)
	North East Valley Post Office (Former)	282 North Road and Calder Avenue	North East Valley	1914	Post Office (Retail premises) (Retail)
	North East Valley War Memorial	248 North Road	North East Valley	1920–21	Memorial (in use)
	North Taieri Presbyterian Church	39 Wairongoa Road	North Taieri	1867	Church (in use)
	Occupation		Waikouaiti		(Archaeology site)
	Toitū Otago Settlers Museum	31 Queens Gardens	Central city	1908	Museum (in use)
	Otago Therapeutic Pool	140 Hanover Street	Central city	1945–46	Public swimming pool (in use)
	Oven	Papanui Farm Settlement	Mount Charles, Otago Peninsula		Cooking site (farm)
	Ovens	Papanui Maori Reserve	Cape Saunders, Otago Peninsula		Cooking site (reserve)
	Pa (Mapoutahi)	400 Osborne Rd	Osborne	1700s	Pā (reserve)
	Penrose's Department Store	207 George Street	Central city	1909	Retail (in use)
	Pinner House	15 Cliffs Road	Saint Clair		Residential (in use)
	Plume Clothes Shop	George Street	Central city	1900	Retail (in use)
	The Poplars	167 McDonald Road	Woodside	1860s (mid)	Residential
	Port Chalmers Hotel	Beach Street	Port Chalmers	1875	Accommodation
	Port Chalmers Marine Lodge (Former)	Wickliffe Terrace	Port Chalmers	1863	Freemasonry lodge (residence then live music venue)
	Portsea Terrace	127-131b Stafford Street	City Rise	1882	Accommodation (in use)
	Post Office, Waikouaiti (Former)	Main Road	Waikouaiti	1907	Post office (closed in 1989, now an art studio and gallery).
	Presbyterian Manse	12 Cemetery Road	East Taieri	1877–78	Accommodation (in use)
	Provincial Hotel	14 George Street	Port Chalmers	1917	Public house
	Pukehiki Church	Highcliff and Camp Roads	Pukehiki, Otago Peninsula	1867–68	Church (in use)
	Pukekura		Taiaroa Head, Otago Peninsula		Pā (reserve)
	Queen Victoria Memorial Statue	Queens Gardens	Central city	1901–05	Memorial (in use)
	Queens Building	109 Princes Street	Central city	1926	Offices (in use)
	Ramsay Lodge	60 Stafford Street	City Rise	1900	Accommodation (in use)
	Ravensbourne Post Office	Wanaka Street and Ravensbourne Road	Ravensbourne	1913	Post office (closed 1988)
	Renfrew House	111 Highgate	Roslyn	1863	Accommodation (in use)
	Resident Technician's Cottage	297 Hatchery Road	Portobello		Accommodation – part of Portobello Marine Laboratory (in use)
	Rockwell Hall	297 Wakari Road	Helensburgh		Accommodation (in use)
	Roslyn Post Office	309 Highgate	Roslyn	1907	Post office (closed 1988)
	Roslyn Presbyterian Church	19–21 Highgate	Roslyn	1904	Church (in use)
	Ross Home (P.S.S.A.)	360 North Road	North East Valley	1918	Hospice (in use)
	St Barnabas Anglican Church	266 Coast Road	Warrington	1872	Church (in use)
	St David Street Footbridge	St David Street	University of Otago, North Dunedin	1902	Bridge (in use)
	St David's Presbyterian Church	224 North Road and 4 James Street	North East Valley	1884–85	Church (residential)
	St Duthus House (Solicitors Offices)	504 George Street	Central city	1903	Residential (in use)
	St Joseph's Hall (Former)	255 Rattray Street and Bishops Place	City Rise		Church
	St Leonards School	29 St Leonards Drive	Saint Leonards	1885	School (in use)
	St Mary's Star of the Sea Church (Catholic)	34 Magnetic Street	Port Chalmers		Church (in use)
	St Mary's Star of the Sea Presbytery	Magnetic Street	Port Chalmers		Accommodation
	St Michael's Antiochian Orthodox Church	72 Fingall Street	South Dunedin	1911	Church (in use)
	St Patrick's Basilica	32 Macandrew Road	South Dunedin	1892–94	Church (in use)
	St Peter's Anglican Church Complex	500 Hillside Road	Caversham	1864	Church (in use)
	Salisbury	141 Wairongoa Road	North Taieri	1873	Accommodation (in use)
	Salvation Army Fortress	37 Dowling Street	The Exchange	1892	Hall and education
	Scott Building – Otago Medical School	Great King Street	Dunedin North	1916	University Building (in use)
	Scott Expedition Memorial	Blueskin Road	Port Chalmers	1913–14	Memorial (in use)
	Security Building	115 Stuart Street	Central city	1918	Offices (in use)
	Selwyn College Main Building	560 Castle Street	Dunedin North	1891	University college (in use)
	Shop facades next to Bank of New Zealand Building	3–9 George Street	Port Chalmers	19th Century	Retail (in use)
	Smaill's Homestead and Outbuildings	2 and 42 Southdale and Karetai/Tomahawk Roads	Smaills Beach, Otago Peninsula	1870s (late) or 1880s (early)	Residential and farm (farm and clubrooms)
	Sound Shell (bandstand)	Dunedin Botanic Gardens	The Gardens	1914	Music stage (in use)
	Springbank	Main Road	East Taieri	1860	Residential (in use)
	Springbank View	Main South Road	East Taieri	1860	Residential (in use)
	Stafford Gables (Youth Hostel)	71 Stafford Street	City Rise	1907	
	Stephens Inks Building	301 Moray Place	Central city	1908	
	Taiaroa Head Fog Station		Taiaroa Head, Otago Peninsula		
	Taieri River Bridge	Hyde-Macraes Road	Hyde	1879	Bridge (in use)
	Taimex Building (Formerly Hallenstein's)	126 Rattray Street	The Exchange	1875	Offices (Restaurant)
	Te Pa a Te Wera	Huriawa Peninsula	Karitane	c. 1750	Pā (Reserve)
	Terrace Houses	618–626 Great King Street	Dunedin North		Residential (in use)
	Terraces/Midden	Papanui Farm	Cape Saunders, Otago Peninsula		
	Thomson Residence (Former)	692 Cumberland Street	Dunedin North	1914	Residential
	Transit House	44 Park Street	Central city	1884	Residential (in use)
	Tumai	Tumai Station Road	Tumai, near Waikouaiti	1300s	Small settlement (midden)
	Union Bank of Australia	319 Princes Street	The Exchange	1874 (opened)	Bank (Night club)
	University Book Shop (formerly Romison's Confectionery Works)	378 Great King Street	Dunedin North	1910	Factory (retail from 1962)
	University Lodge	Stevenson Lane	Saint Leonards	1930	Residence
	University Lodge Glasshouse	Stevenson Lane	Saint Leonards		Greenhouse
	University of Otago Physical Education Department (Formerly Dunedin Teachers' Training College)	Cumberland Street	Dunedin North	1909	University Building (in use)
	University of Otago Stone Bridge	Union Street	Dunedin North	1924	Bridge (in use)
	Victoria Terrace	1046–1056 George Street	Dunedin North	1897	Residential (in use)
	Winchendon	Jeffcoates Road	Saddle Hill	1857	Residential
	Winchendon Barn	Jeffcoates Road	Saddle Hill		Farm building
	Winchendon Cowman's Cottage	Jeffcoates Road	Saddle Hill	1860	Residential (in use)
	Wingatui Railway Station	Gladstone Road	Wingatui railway station	1914	Railway building
	Wingatui Railway Station Signal Box	Gladstone Road	Wingatui	1914	Railway building
	Winter Gardens (original portion)	The Gardens	Dunedin Botanic Gardens	1908	Park
	Wood Adams Building	19 Bond Street	Warehouse Precinct	1932	Offices
	Woodhaugh Hotel	29 Malvern Street	Woodhaugh	1882	Hotel (residential)
	Wreck of the Victory	Victory Beach	Otago Peninsula	1861	Shipwreck
	York House and Kirkwood House (Former)	112–114 Moray Place	Central city	1876–1877	Residential

=== Other notable places of historical significance ===
Photo	Name	Street	Suburb/Locality	Date of construction	Original (current) use
	Abbotsford landslip	Christie, Mitchell, Edward, Gordon & Charles Street	Abbotsford	1979 (landslip)	Residential (reserve)
	Careys Bay Hotel	17 Macandrew Road	Careys Bay	1876	Hotel (in use)
	Caversham Immigration Barracks	Elbe Street	The Glen	1873	Immigrant temporary accommodation (residential)
	Dunedin Chinese Garden	Rattray Street	Queens Gardens	2006–08	Gardens
	Dunedin Civic Centre	The Octagon	Central city	c. 1980	Council offices
	Dunedin Public Library	Moray Place	Central city	1978–81	Library
	Fernhill Mine and area		Saddle Hill and Brighton	1849 (First New Zealand coal mine) 1969 (collapse)	Mine (vacant, farm and residential)
	Landing site of the John Wickliffe	Water Street	The Exchange	1848 (Landing date)	Boat landing (city street)
	New Zealand national anthem (first public performance)	109 Princes Street	Central city	1876 (performance)	Theatre (Commercial offices)
	Otago South African War memorial	Dunedin Oval	Kensington	1906	Memorial
	Saint Clair Breakwater	Saint Clair Beach	Saint Clair	1900s	Sand trap (ruin)
	Speight's Brewery	200 Rattray Street	The Exchange	1876 (rebuilt 1940)	Brewery (in use)
	Stafford House (Barton's Building)	Stafford and Manse Streets	The Exchange	1928	Commercial and retail premises
	Victoria Channel		Otago Harbour	1881 (official opening)	Shipping channel

== See also ==
- List of historic hotels in Otago
- History of the Dunedin urban area
- History of Otago
- List of historic places in Christchurch
- List of historic places in Palmerston North

== Bibliography ==
- Croot, Charles (1999). Dunedin churches past and present. Dunedin: Otago Settlers Association.
