= List of historic hotels in Otago =

The following is a list of historic hotels in the New Zealand South Island Region of Otago.

Otago was New Zealand's richest province in the late nineteenth century thanks to the Otago gold rush. It has a wealth of historic buildings, many of them originally dedicated to the accommodation and hospitality trade. The discovery of gold at Gabriel's Gully in 1861 led to a massive influx of fortune-seekers, and the resulting gold strikes created much prosperity in the young colony. The area around Queenstown, Cromwell, and Clyde grew rapidly, as did the provincial capital, Dunedin, and the port towns of Oamaru and Port Chalmers. Many of New Zealand's grandest Victorian buildings can be found in Otago as a result.

The following list is of buildings classified as Category I or II by the New Zealand Historic Places Trust located in Otago which served (or were intended to serve) much of their early history as accommodation or taverns. Note that in New Zealand English, the term "hotel" can refer to either a hostelry or to a public house, or — more commonly — to an establishment which serves both functions within the same building.

== Dunedin ==
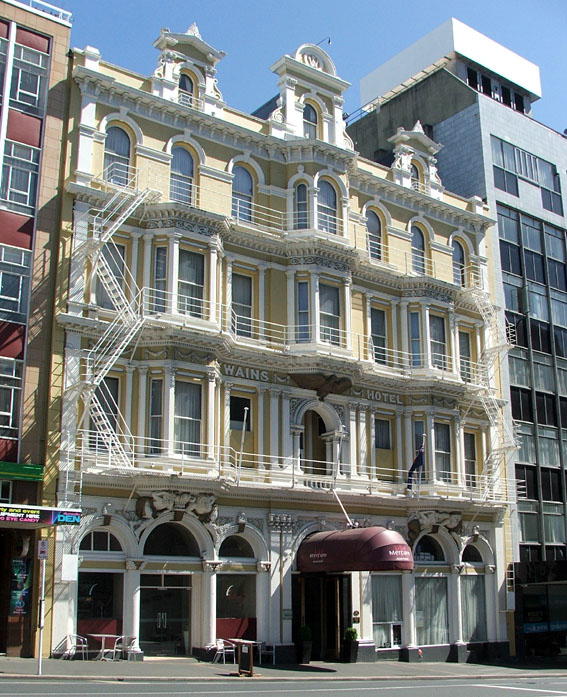
Wains Hotel

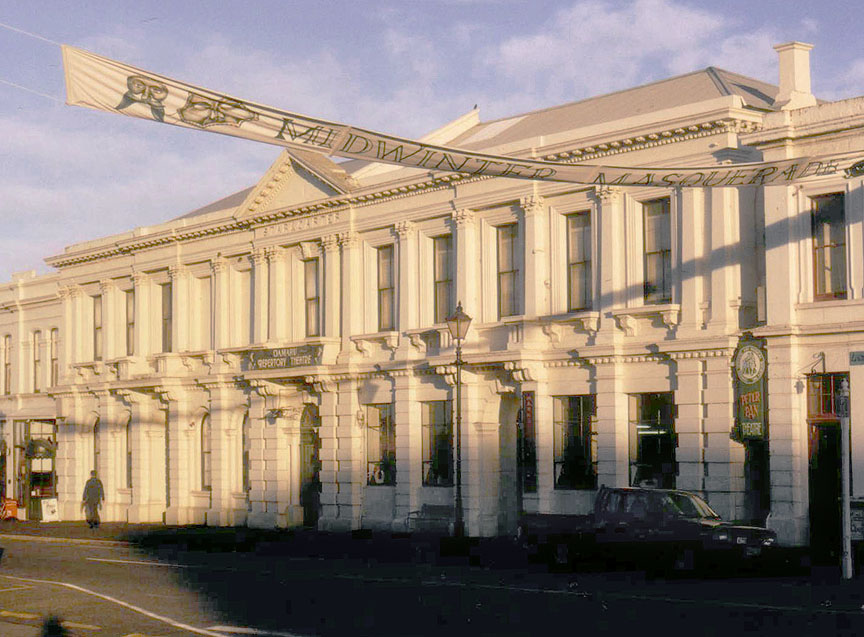
Oamaru's former Star and Garter Hotel

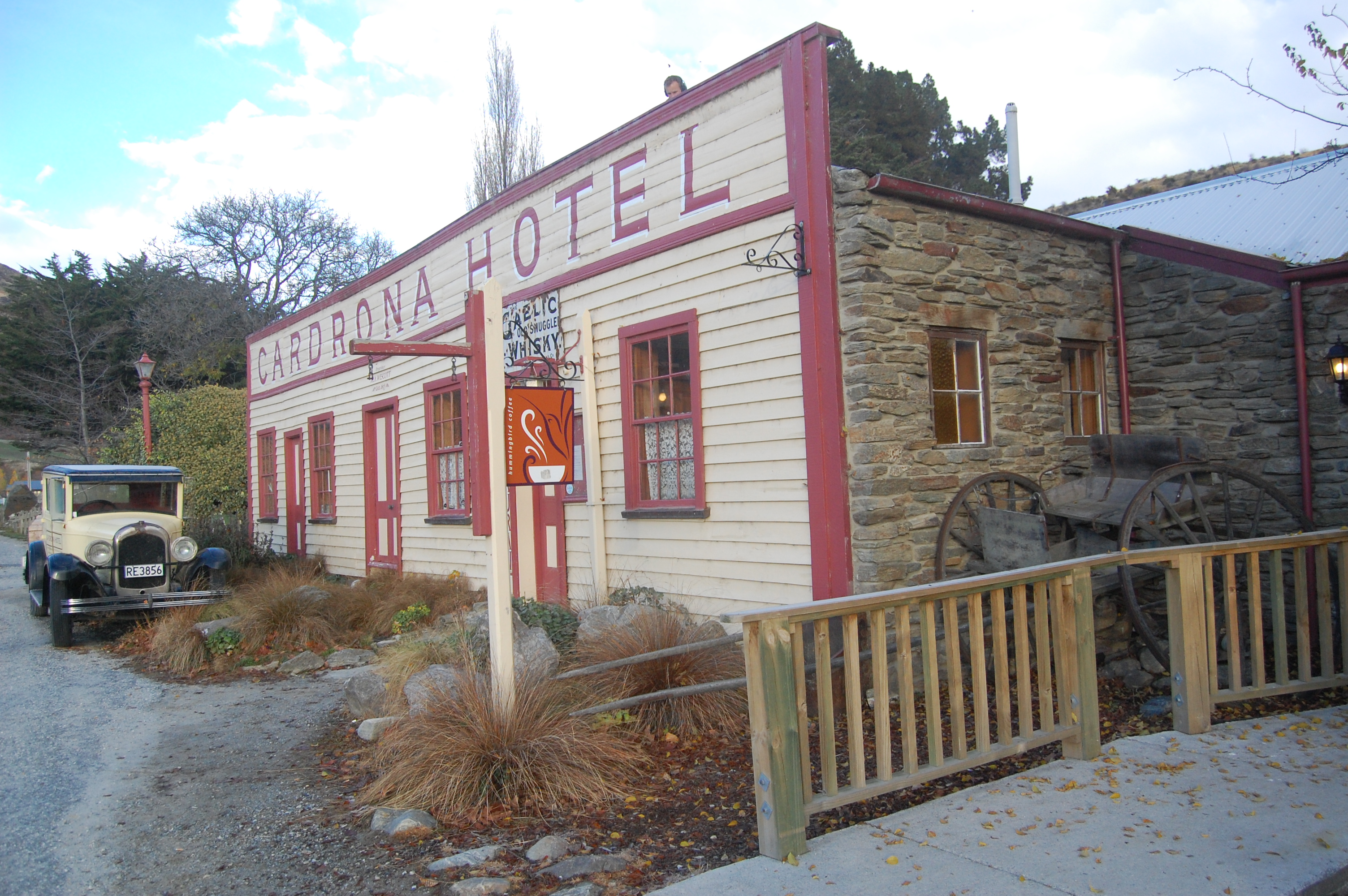
Cardrona Hotel, showing the false front

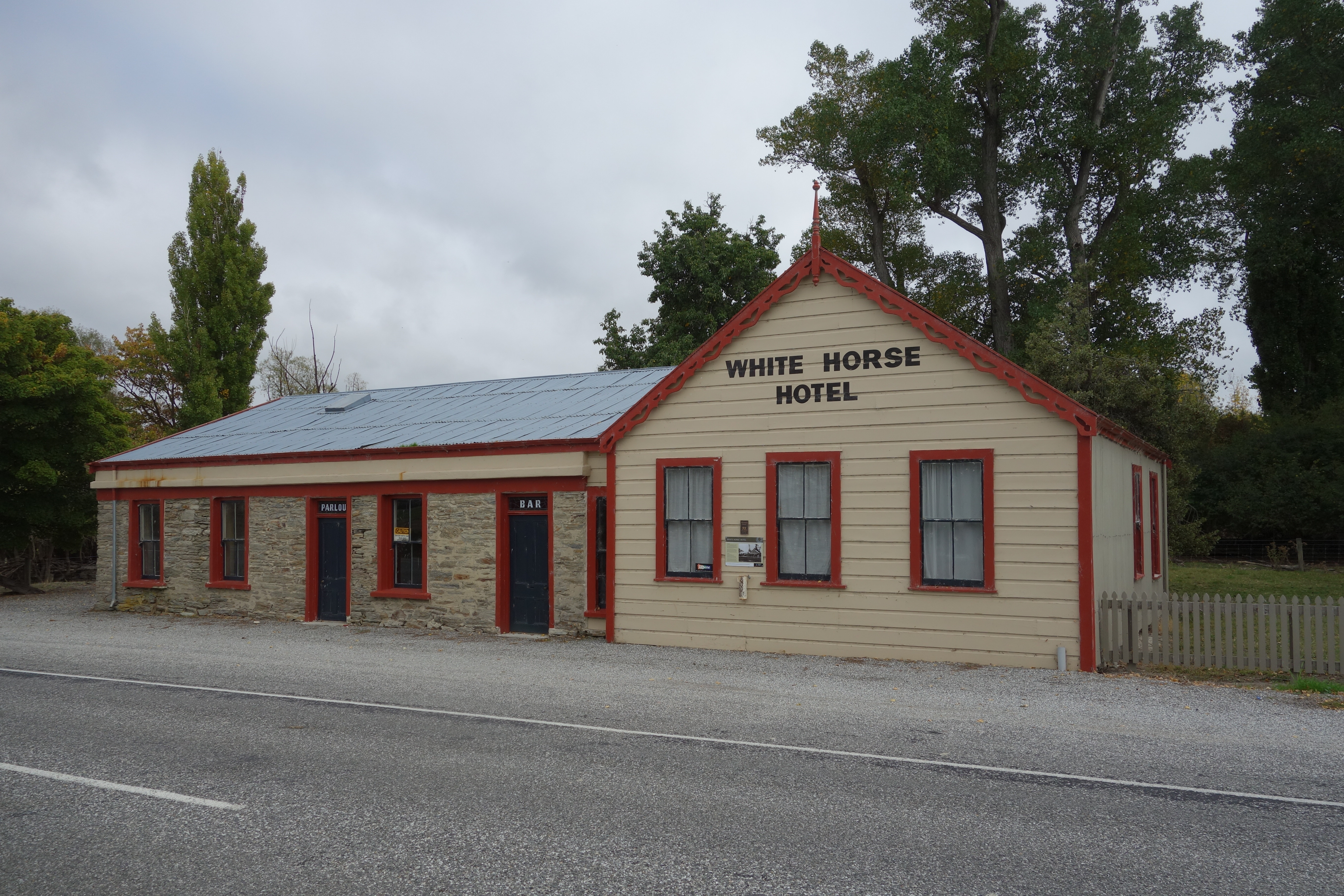
White Horse Hotel, Becks

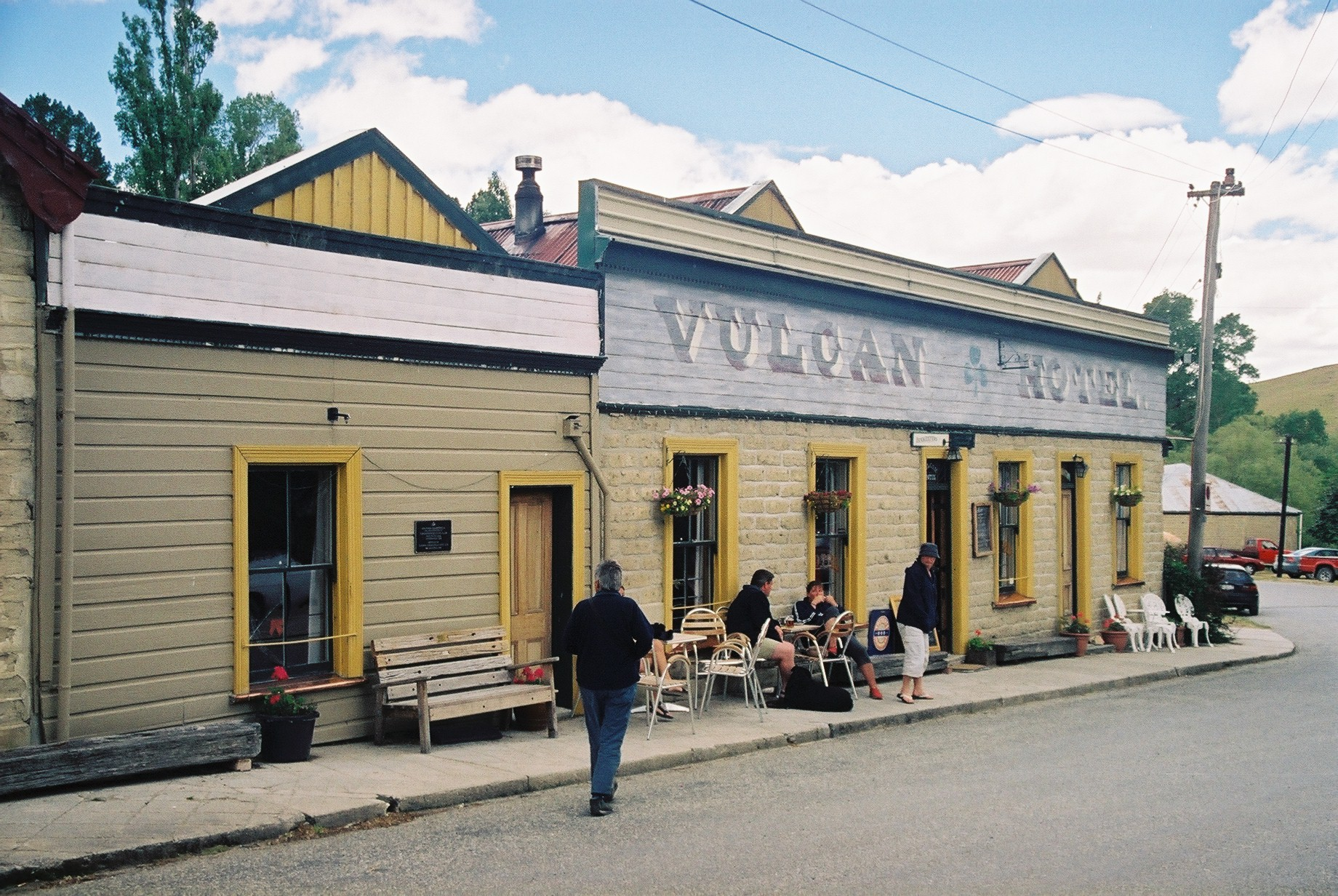
The Vulcan Hotel in St. Bathans is reputedly haunted by the ghost of a nineteenth century prostitute.

- Chick's Hotel, Mount Street, Port Chalmers (Category II)
- Former Dandie Dinmont Hotel, Doon Street, Waverley (Category II) – The "White House" of Waverley, close to the edge of the Otago Harbour was built in 1880 for William Larnach. Intended as a combined hotel and residence, it was never used for its intended purpose but remained a private residence.
- Empire Hotel, Princes Street (Category I) – Previously The Queen's Arms, the Empire's origins go back to 1858, not long after the foundation of Otago. The current building dates from 1879, and the Empire name dates to 1898. The more recent history of the Empire includes a close association with the local music culture which became known worldwide as the Dunedin sound.
- Former Excelsior Hotel, Dowling Street (Category II)
- Law Courts Hotel, Stuart Street (Category II) – major Art Deco structure in the heart of Dunedin city.
- Port Chalmers Hotel, Beach Street, Port Chalmers (Category II)
- Provincial Hotel, George Street, Port Chalmers (Category II)
- Southern Cross Hotel, High Street (Category I) – formerly the Grand Hotel, the elaborately façaded hotel was designed by Louis Boldini in the early 1880s.
- Wains Hotel, Princes Street (Category I) – one of Dunedin's best-known buildings, with an ornate façade and equally elaborate interior. Built at the height of the gold rush.
- Former Woodhaugh Hotel, Malvern Street, Woodhaugh (Category II)

== North Otago and East Otago ==
- Criterion Hotel, Clyde Street, Oamaru (Category I) – Built in 1881 from Oamaru Stone, this building is a major part of Oamaru's historic precinct.
- Junction Hotel, Wansbeck Street, Oamaru (Category II) – a major hilltop landmark close to the southern entrance to Oamaru.
- Former Northern Hotel, Wansbeck Street, Oamaru (Category II) – Oamaru's first hotel, built in 1860.
- Former Queen's Hotel, Thames Street, Oamaru (Category II) – A major Victorian structure, built at the height of Otago's prosperity in the 1880s
- Former Star and Garter Hotel, Itchen Street, Oamaru (Category I) - Built in the mid-1860s

== South Otago and West Otago ==
- Former Waiwera Hotel, Waiwera South (Category II)

== Central Otago ==
- Ancient Briton Hotel, Naseby (Category II) – Built in 1900 on the site of a historic goldfields tavern of the same name dating back to 1863.
- Cardrona Hotel False Front, Cardrona (Category II) – The gold-miner's watering hole in Cardrona was little more than a tin shed, but to hide this, the publican had an impressive false front attached to the structure, which still survives - although the structure it hid has long been replaced by a more sturdy structure.
- Former Commercial Hotel, Clyde (Category II) – Now the Dunstan Hotel, this stone structure dates to 1903.
- Former Dunstan Hotel, Clyde (Category II) – Not to be confused with the Former Commercial Hotel (currently operating as the Dunstan Hotel) this stone structure dates to 1900 and replaces the first Dunstan Hotel, which dated to the 1860s gold rush.
- Eichardt's Hotel, Queenstown (Category II) – One of Central Otago's best-known buildings, Eichardt's (originally The Queen's Arms) was built in the 1860s and originally owned by Queenstown's founder, William Rees.
- Former Lee Stream Hotel, Lee Stream (Category II) – The Lee Stream Hotel was a major staging post for prospectors on the way to the goldfields around the Maniototo, and lies on the main highway between Outram and Middlemarch.
- Royal Hotel, Naseby (Category II) – As with the Cardrona Hotel (above), Naseby's Royal Hotel features a false front. This hotel, the second of its name in the town, dates from 1865. Cobb and Co. services used the hotel as a depot from 1869.
- Former Simmond's Boarding House, Alexandra (Category II) – A prominent 1882 stone structure close to the southern end of Alexandra.
- Stanley's Hotel, Macraes Flat (Category I) – This stone hotel was built in 1882, and has operated for over 130 years. The hotel has been kept in its original condition, along with associated structures including a billiards room, a stone shed, and stables.
- Vulcan Hotel, Saint Bathans (Category I) – An iconic Central Otago structure, the adobe brick Vulcan Hotel epitomises New Zealand country gold-miners' taverns of the 1880s. The building is also one of the country's best known reputedly haunted houses.
- Former White Horse Hotel, Becks (Category II)
- Hulbert House, Queenstown (category II)
