= Shacklock =

Shacklock is a surname. Notable people with the surname include:

- Alan Shacklock (born 1950), English musician
- Constance Shacklock (1913–1999), English contralto
- Frank Shacklock (1861 – 1 May 1937), English cricketer
- Henry Ely Shacklock (1839–1902), Kiwi iron moulder and manufacturer
- Kerry Shacklock (born 1971), English swimmer
- Michael Shacklock (born 2008), Singaporean sprinter
