= Princes Street, Dunedin =

Street in Dunedin, New Zealand

Coordinates: 45.88181°S 170.49936°E

Princes Street
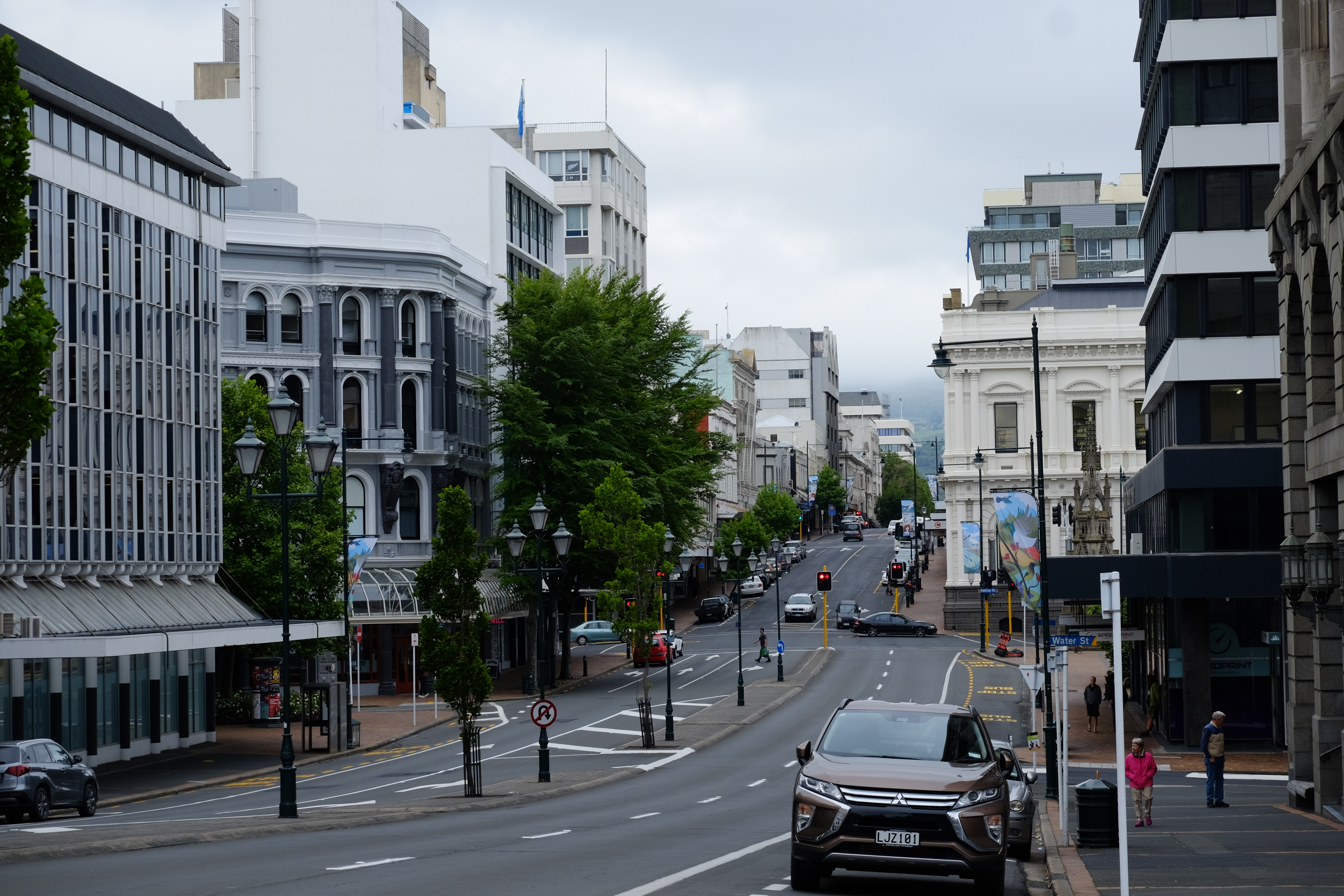
- From The Exchange, looking north up Princes Street towards The Octagon. The historic Southern Cross Hotel building is prominent, centre-left, the former BNZ bank building is centre-right.
- Interactive map of Princes Street
- Maintained by: Dunedin City Council
- Length: 2.0 km (1.2 mi)
- Location: Dunedin, New Zealand
- Postal code: 9016
- North end: Octagon, central Dunedin
- South end: King Edward Street/Ardmore Drive, Kensington

Princes Street (often misspelt as "Princess Street") is a major street in Dunedin, the second largest city in the South Island of New Zealand. It runs south-southwest for two kilometres from The Octagon in the city centre to the Oval sports ground, close to the city's Southern Cemetery. North of The Octagon, George Street continues the line of Princes Street north-northeast for two and a half kilometres. Princes Street is straight but undulating, skirting the edge of the City Rise to its northwest. The part of the street immediately below The Octagon is the steepest section, as the road traverses an old cutting through Bell Hill.

Princes Street was developed during Dunedin's 1860s boom from the Otago gold rush, and consequently is one of New Zealand's most historic streets, with about 70 buildings in close proximity listed on the New Zealand Historic Places Trust Register. Originally the site of the city's wharf, a substantial area of land to the east of the street was formerly part of Otago Harbour, much of it reclaimed via rock removed during the lowering of Bell Hill which separated Princes Street from northern Dunedin in the early years of settlement. In the years following the gold rush, Princes Street was the heart of Dunedin's central business district, but much of the city's main retail area has now shifted north to George Street.

== History ==
In the early years of Dunedin's settlement, much of the city's growth was on two areas of reasonably flat land close to the harbour, separated by the large Bell Hill and an area of low swampy land. The northern of these two flat areas surrounded the floodplain of the Water of Leith, a small river that runs through Dunedin. As the city grew the swamp was drained to become the new city's centre, and the hill was lowered by excavation to allow access between the two areas of settlement. A street grid was set up with the main road split in two by the city centre (now The Octagon) – Princes Street to the south and George Street to the north. As with many of the city's other place names, both these names and that of the Water of Leith reflect the names of places in Edinburgh, Scotland.

In the settlement's early days, Bell Hill proved a major obstacle to travel south of the city centre, and major excavation work was carried out to provide access to the south. A cutting was made in the hill in 1858, and during the 1860s the hill was lowered by some 14 metres (46 ft). The cutting allowed for the passage of transport between the two parts of the town. The southern flank of the hill was also completely removed (that area now being occupied by Queen's Gardens). The stone removed from the hill was used as construction material for many of the city's first permanent buildings, and also as fill to reclaim the northern end of the Southern Endowment along the edge of the harbour. This reclamation work added a considerable area to the central city; the original docks, close to the Exchange area of Princes Street, are now several hundred metres inland.

The area of Princes Street between the Exchange and Market Reserve was a frequent source of dispute in the early years of European settlement. This area, at that time on the foreshore of Otago Harbour was a traditional landing site for Māori waka. Captain Cargill, the founder of the new city, wished to follow the British practice of keeping the foreshore as public land. As the town spread, the area around the landing site became populated by settlers, and visiting Māori relied on the coastal strip as a place to set up their encampments. The southern Commissioner for Crown Lands, Walter Mantell noted the problem and proposed to his superiors in Wellington that a site be found at which the Māori could erect permanent structures, naming the Princes Street foreshore as the preferred site. Mantell and Cargill, who had been bitter political opponents for the control of the early settlement, quickly found themselves at loggerheads over the proposal, and disputes over the ownership and allocation of the land dragged on for over two decades, finally being settled in the courts in 1877.

In the years following the Otago gold rush of the 1860s Dunedin grew rapidly, with much of the growth being centred on Princes Street. In the city's early years this road was notorious for its unformed rough nature, a consequence of the work on Bell Hill, and led to Dunedin's early nickname of "Mud-edin". The prosperity brought by the gold rush led to a boom in construction, and within a handful of years, the area around lower Princes Street became the most prosperous in the country. Many of the prominent grand buildings of this part of Dunedin date from this period, and numerous structures in the area have New Zealand Historic Places Trust classification as a result.

There is a considerable photographic record of early Princes Street, largely thanks to the presence in the street of the studios of the Burton Brothers, pioneering New Zealand photographers. Many of their images, and those of other early Dunedin photographers, were collated and published in a series of books by photographic historian Hardwicke Knight, one of which — a collection of photographic works by Daniel Louis Mundy — was entitled Princes Street by gaslight (1977).

Several notable companies have either been founded or had their headquarters in Princes Street. Notable among these were The Drapery and General Importing Company of New Zealand, later simply known as The D.I.C., Hallenstein's, and H.E. Shacklock. The first New Zealand headquarters of Briscoes were also located on Princes Street.

In 2018, Whakamana Cannabis Museum, New Zealand's first and only cannabis museum, relocated to the Eldon Chambers Building on Princes Street, though it has since moved to Christchurch.

== Route ==
Central Dunedin. Princes Street (4) is the street shown in red leading south from the Octagon (2). The 4 is placed at the location of John Wickliffe Plaza.

=== The "Top 100" ===
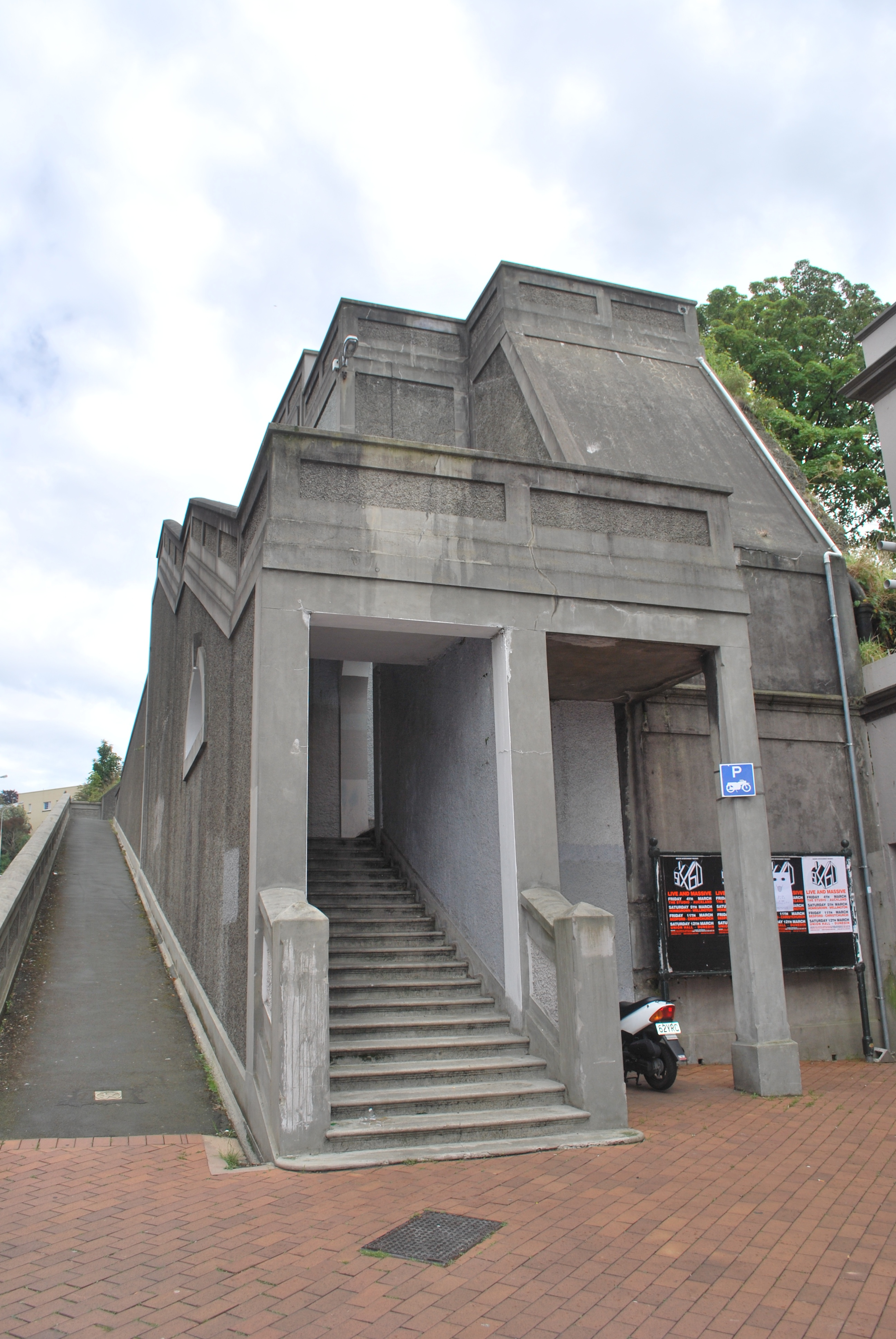
The Dowling Street steps

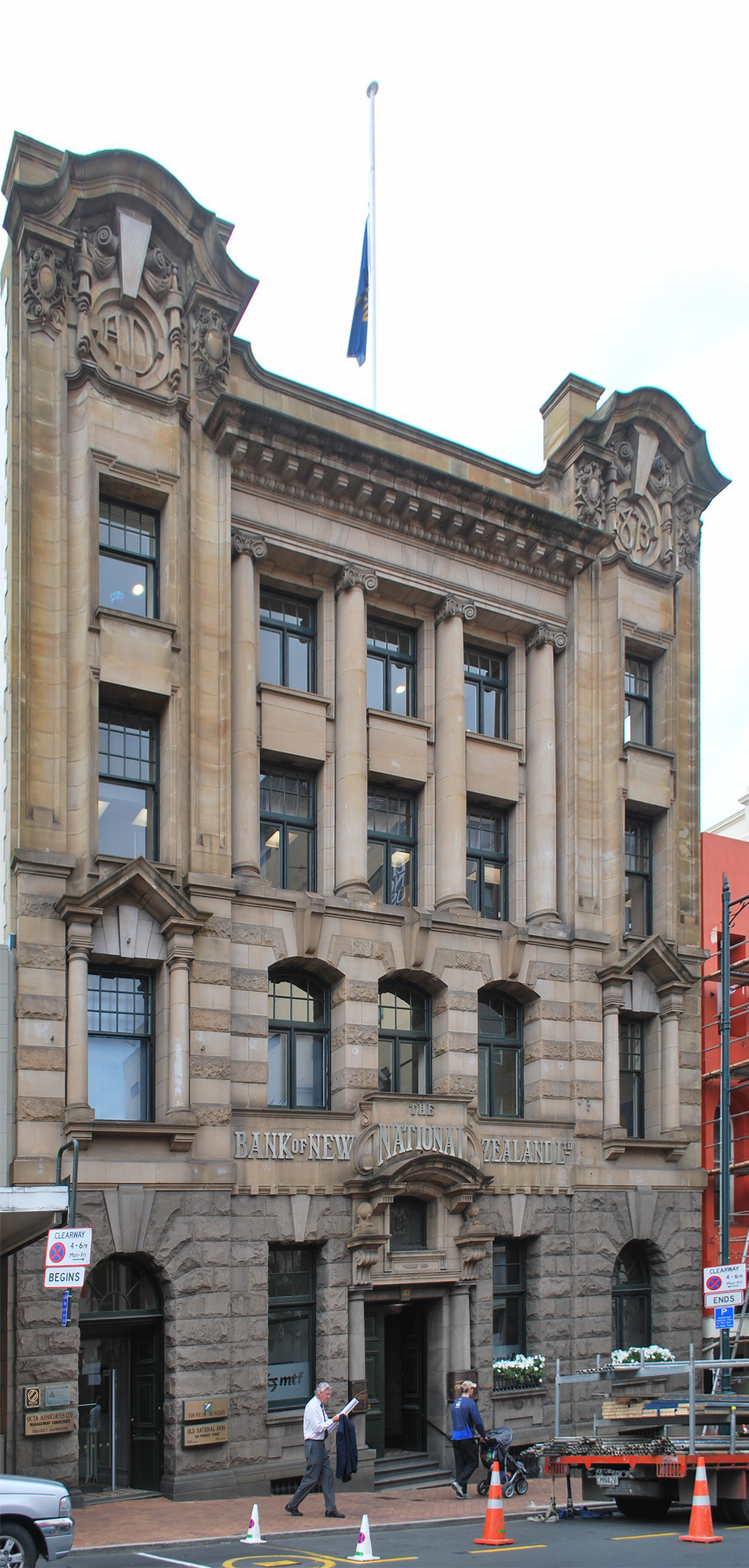
Former National Bank building, 193 Princes Street

From the Octagon, Princes Street initially rises as it passes through a commercial district formerly commonly known as the Top 100, crossing the outer Octagon of Moray Place before descending through the original cutting of Bell Hill towards the Exchange. The Top 100 theoretically took its name from the 100 retail businesses which line Princes Street from the Octagon to the Exchange, although the actual number of businesses is not one hundred. This part of the city is sometimes seen as the creative heart of Dunedin, with numerous art galleries, artist's studios, and video production companies being based in the area from Moray Place to Rattray Street and especially around the Dowling Street area.

Some parts of the Bell Hill cutting are still visible from Princes Street, though the most obvious escarpment of the hill is found between Moray Place and Queen's Gardens, close to First Church. From Princes Street, the most notable part of the cutting is at Dowling Street, 300 metres south of the Octagon. Dowling Street narrows significantly above this intersection. The Dowling Street Steps, a 1926 structure listed by the New Zealand Historic Places Trust, rise from close to the Princes Street-Dowling Street intersection, ascending a cliff that was formed as a result of the original work on Bell Hill.

=== The Exchange ===
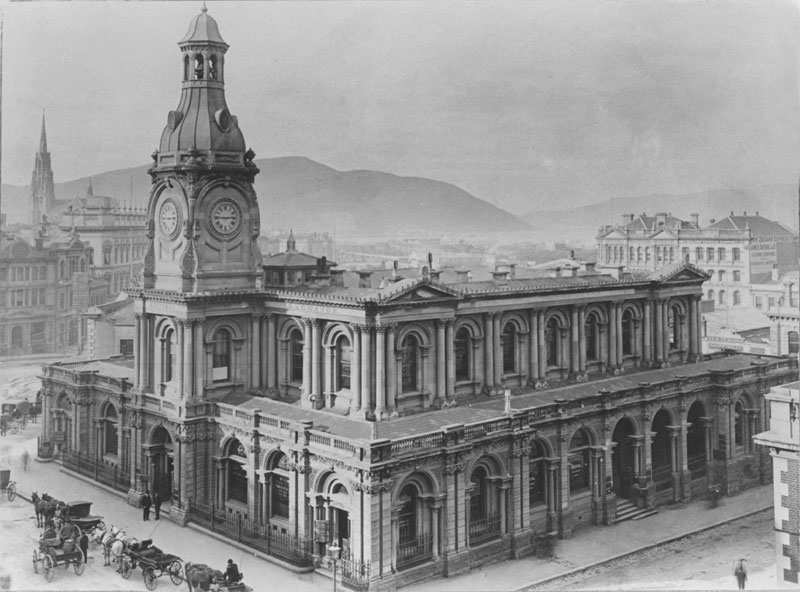
The Exchange Building, designed by William Mason and demolished in the 1960s to make way for John Wickliffe House, gave the area its name

The Exchange, 400 metres south of The Octagon and extending for one block on either side of Princes Street, was the original financial heart of the city, but the CBD has drifted north to its current location on George Street. This area is the lowest part of the street, as it descends from the remains of Bell Hill. Now several hundred metres inland from the edge of the Otago Harbour, this was the site of the original landing place of settlers from the two ships which brought the Otago Association's settlers to Dunedin. The two ships, the John Wickliffe and the Philip Laing, arrived in early 1848. As they could not negotiate the harbour, they set anchor at the Otago Heads. Settlers from the ships travelled by smaller rowing boat from there to Dunedin. Massive reclamation of the area led to the creation of a wide strip of land, since occupied by commercial premises, warehousing, and the main rail line. This part of Princes Street was at one point the location of a bridge across a small stream, the Toitu Stream, now diverted underground. A spring which fed the stream is still used as the source of water for Speight's Brewery, which is located 200 metres to the northwest on Rattray Street.

The former Exchange Building, from which The Exchange takes its name, was designed by William Mason as a Post Office and later occupied by the University of Otago and the Otago Museum. Next to this was the 1863 Customhouse building, and outside the two was an open space known as Customhouse Square. The Exchange building was pulled down in 1969, and it was largely the destruction of this building that led to changes in attitudes by Dunedinites regarding the change of their cityscape. The area is the site of several prominent Victorian buildings, notably former bank buildings at the northern end of the area. Other imposing buildings in the area include the former Chief Post Office building, now the Distinction Dunedin Hotel. John Wickliffe Plaza is also the site of one of Dunedin's more notable public monuments, the Cargill Monument, dedicated to city founder Captain William Cargill. This monument, designed by Charles Robert Swyer and built in 1863–4, was originally sited in the Octagon, but was moved to the Exchange in 1872. Other sculptures in John Wickliffe Plaza include "We are not alone", a group of three stylised penguins created in 1999 by Parry Jones.

=== Below the Exchange ===
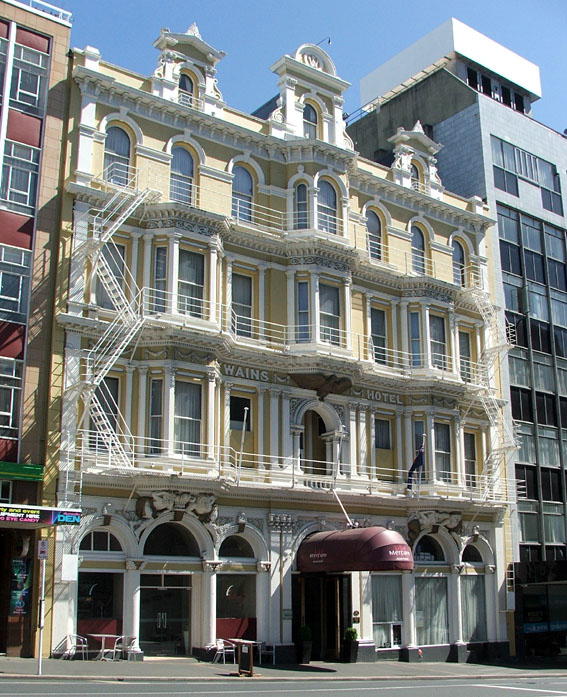
Wain's Hotel building, in the Exchange

The lower Exchange and area immediately to the south of it contains some other notable buildings, including several of Dunedin's more notable former and current public houses. Among these are Wain's Hotel, the Provincial Hotel (at the foot of Stafford Street), the Empire Tavern, and the former Prince of Wales Hotel. Wain's Hotel, immediately opposite the former Post Office building, is an imposing Italianate structure built in 1878 from designs by Mason and Wales. The Empire Tavern also has a long history, and claims to be Dunedin's oldest pub, having been continuously licensed since 1858. Its recent past is closely tied with the Dunedin sound music scene of the 1980s, of which it was a principal venue. Prior to its gutting by fire in the 1980s, the Prince of Wales Hotel, a block further down Princes Street, was noted for an unusual gimmick, in that the upstairs restaurant facilities were extensively themed on old railway carriages, and included in their decor several original vintage pieces of rolling stock. The Prince of Wales was later (1992–2010) the location of one of the city's top restaurants, Bell Pepper Blues.

Lower Princes Street rises slightly from the Exchange before dropping down, becoming flat for the final kilometre of its length. Here, there is a mix of commercial, wholesale, and light industrial properties, with only occasional retail shops. The street itself widens from thee crest below the Exchange, becoming a dual carriageway from this point south to the major junction at the southern end of the Oval. Several notable buildings are still found in the lower Princes Street area, among them the former H.E. Shacklock building and the Crown Roller Mills Building; the latter in particular is a notable landmark.

The Crown Roller Mills building is not in Princes Street itself, but rather lies at the foot of Manor Place, close to its intersection with Princes Street. It stands at the edge of a small area of parkland called the Market Reserve, at the opposite edge of which is the city's main bus depot. This area was swampland when the first European settlers arrived in Dunedin, but was reclaimed and did host a regular market for a few years from the 1870s. The market was not well-supported, however, and eventually folded. The bus depot is located on the site of the city's 1902 Tram workshops. The Market Reserve also contains a children's playground and, at the edge closes to the Crown Roller Mills Building, a small monument dedicated to Otago workers who have lost their lives while at work. This simple bluestone memorial was erected in 2003 by the New Zealand Council of Trade Unions on a site donated by the Dunedin City Council.

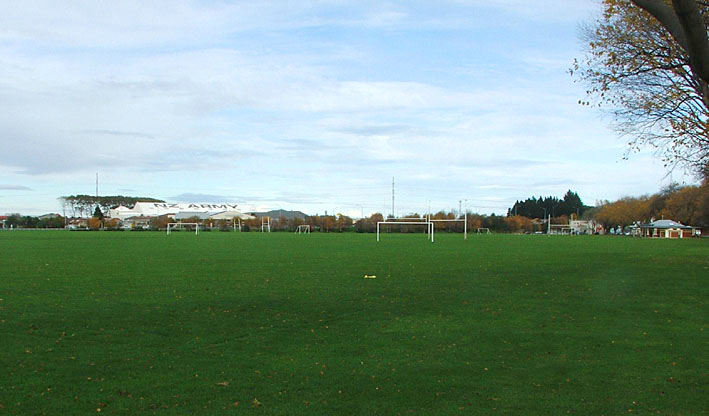
Kensington Oval lies at the southern end of Princes Street, effectively separating the central city from South Dunedin.

At the bottom end of Princes Street is the former Dunedin Metropolitan Club building, now home to Natural History New Zealand, one of the country's leading television production companies. Opposite this lies a large recreation reserve, which — despite its roughly triangular shape — is called the Oval, or more correctly, Kensington Oval. Kensington Oval contains mainly cricket and association football pitches, and also caters for rugby, hockey, and softball. The Oval also contains one of the city's main war memorials, dedicated to the fallen of the Boer War campaign. This lies close to the Oval's northernmost point. Close to the Oval are two major road junctions. At the north end, a link road connects Princes Street with the city's one-way street system (part of State Highway 1) and with Anderson's Bay Road, a major arterial route to South Dunedin and Otago Peninsula. The part of Princes Street close to the Oval, as well as several other nearby streets, was for many years used annually as part of the Dunedin Street Circuit, a temporary inner city motor-racing circuit used during the week-long Southern Festival of Speed, which ran from the 1980s until the early 2010s.

At the southern end of the Oval is a further junction, with Princes Street terminating in a link road to South Dunedin's main street, King Edward Street, and a further road skirting the edge of a hilly spur to join South Road at the northern end of the suburb of Caversham. This latter road passes Dunedin's Southern Cemetery, the oldest and arguably most historic of the city's main cemeteries. The Southern Cemetery's earliest graves are from 1858, and it contains the remains of many of the city's founding fathers, including Captain William Cargill, Thomas Burns, and Johnny Jones. The cemetery is notable for its large Chinese and Jewish sections.

== Transport links ==
The top section of Princes Street, from the Octagon to the Exchange, has for many years been a nexus for Dunedin's public transport system. Until the 2010s, buses from the north of the city largely passed along George Street and into the Octagon; since that time they have largely avoided George Street, being routed through a new bus hub in Great King Street. Buses from the south pass into the southern end of Princes Street, and those from the hill suburbs arrive at the Octagon via Stuart Street or at the Exchange via High and Rattray Streets. Almost all of these use upper Princes Street between the Exchange and the Octagon as part of their route.

In the city's early years trams followed many of these same routes. Until the demise of the system in the 1950s, this area was also at the heart of the Dunedin cable tramway system, with the longer lines running up the slopes of City Rise via High, Rattray, or Stuart Streets.

== Heritage New Zealand listed buildings ==
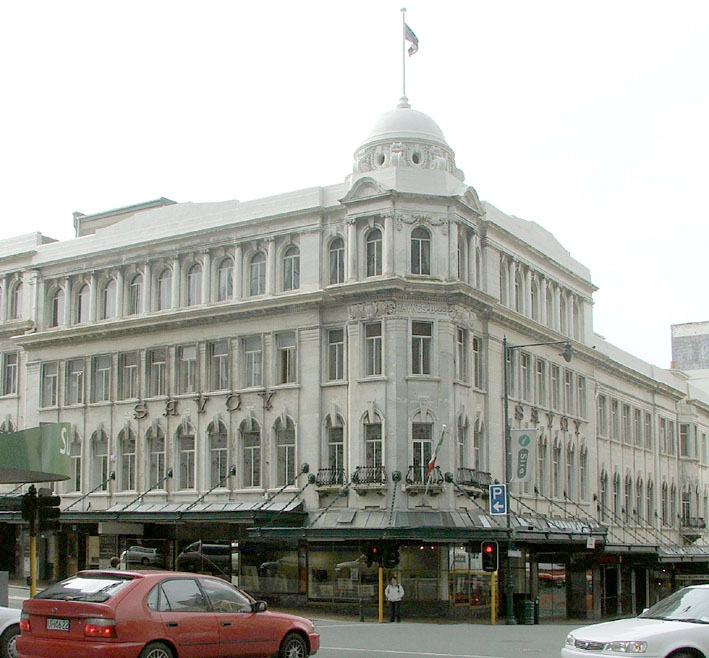
The Haynes' (Savoy) Building at the corner of Princes Street and Moray Place

Few, if any, streets in New Zealand contain as many Heritage New Zealand Category I or Category II protected buildings as Princes Street. These buildings include the following:

- The Haynes' Building, 42–72 Princes St (cnr. Princes St and Moray Place) (Category I). Often now known as the Savoy Building after the restaurant which is its main tenant, this four-storey building was designed by Edmund Anscombe and completed in 1914. The building, with its distinctive cupola, is a major landmark of upper Princes Street, lying one block south of the Octagon.
- The Queen's Building, 109 Princes St (Category II). An early, if small, skyscraper, the five-storey Queen's Building was completed in 1929 on the site of the former Queen's Theatre, to a design of J. Louis Salmond.
- Excelsior Apartments, 33 Dowling Street (cnr. of Dowling and Princes Sts) (Category II). Standing at the heart of Dunedin's 19th century Central Business District, the Excelsior Apartments are an 1888 structure originally built as a tavern and hotel. The building was designed by Robert Forrest.
- The National Bank Building, 193 Princes St (Category I). Designed by William Dunning, an Australian architect, and Charles Fleming MacDonald, this building is reminiscent of many of the grander buildings in Melbourne and Sydney. Constructed in a neo-Baroque style, it uses Tasmanian sandstone and trachyte as a major feature in its façade, and was completed in 1913. Continuing the history of the building be tenanted by financial institutions, the building was for many years home to MTF, a vehicle finance company.
- The Façade of the old Woolworth's Building, 194 Princes St (Category II).

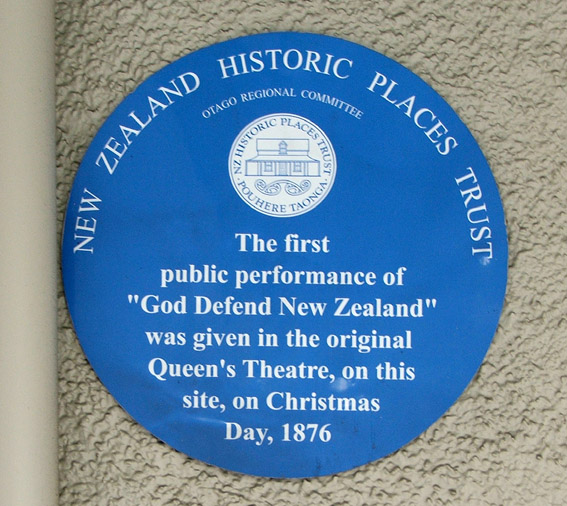
NZHPT Blue Plaque at the Queen's Building, site of the first public performance of the New Zealand national anthem.

- The Bank of New Zealand Building, 205 Princes St (cnr. Princes and High Sts) (Category I). Designed in Venetian Renaissance styling, the 1882 BNZ building stands just two doors along from the National Bank building. The William Armson-designed building is notable for the richly carved exterior work by Louis Godfrey and moulded ceilings in its interior. The façade combines Doric, Ionic and Corinthian styles, and makes good use of Port Chalmers bluestone and Oamaru stone, a compact, cream-coloured limestone.
- The Southern Cross Hotel, 118 High St (cnr. High and Princes Sts) (Category I). One of Dunedin's principal hotels, the Southern Cross is housed in an impressive 1883 building designed by Louis Boldini. It occupies a prominent corner site in the heart of the Exchange. Formerly the Grand Hotel, the building has been extended considerably on several occasions in its history, and was considerably renovated in the 1980s, though most of its original features remain. The Southern Cross Hotel Building is home to Dunedin Casino.
- The Clarion Building, 282–292 Princes St (Category II). This 1878 William Mason building was originally a major drapery store in the heart of what was then Dunedin's retail district. The exterior is of Venetian Gothic style, though the interior has been largely redeveloped in recent years.
- The Chief Post Office Building, 283 Princes St (Category II). The Chief Post Office Building has not had an easy history. Designed by John Mair and the Governments Architects Office, construction was severely delayed by the Great Depression. Originally intended to be built in the early 1930s, it was not completed until 1937. A sturdy and impressive structure, possibly modelled on some of the government architecture in vogue in the United Kingdom during this era, the building held Dunedin's main post office branch until the late 1980s and continued in use as postal offices until 1997. The building remained empty for some time after this. Many plans were put forward for its use, including a hotel, a new site for the city's public library, and offices for either the Dunedin City Council or Otago Regional Council. In 2013, an extensive renovation of the lower few floors began, with Silver Fern Farms moving in on the ground and first floors as anchor tenant in February 2014. Later in the decade the interior of the building was further transformed, turning ito a 4-star hotel, the Distinction Dunedin Hotel.

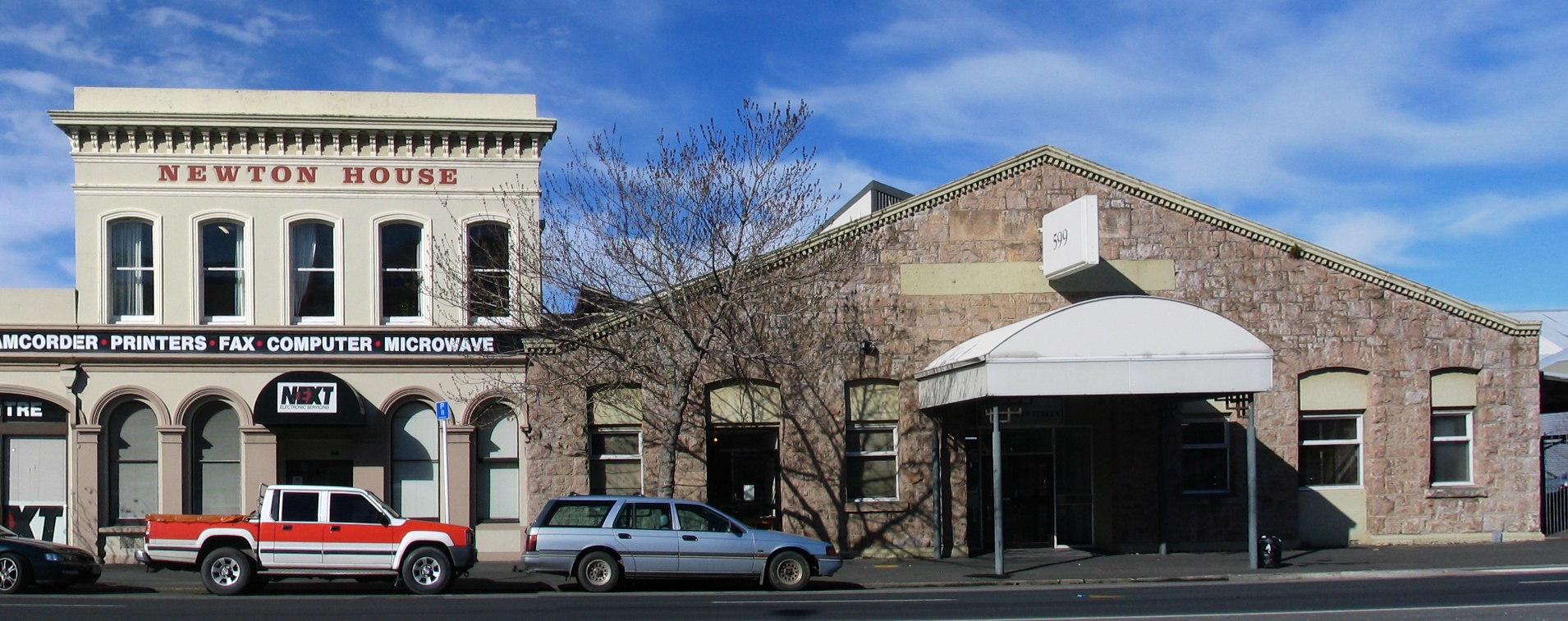
The historic H. E. Shacklock buildings in lower Princes Street

- Wain's Hotel, 310 Princes St (Category I). Built in 1879 to a design by Mason & Wales, Wain's Hotel remains Dunedin's grandest hotel building, and reflects the opulence which followed the Otago gold rush of the 1860s. The interior has been substantially remodelled, but the exterior's Italianate Renaissance façade remains largely intact. This latter features much intricate work by mason George Munro, notably the figures found carved within the panelled spandrels and supporting the façade's oriel windows.
- The ANZ Bank Building, Dunedin, 319 Princes St (Category II). Robert Lawson's 1874 Union Bank of Australasia building is the only classical temple form structure in Dunedin. It is a partner to the architect's work on bank buildings in Oamaru, and features carved Corinthian columns by Godfrey. The building continued to be used as a bank until 1992, and now houses a night club.
- The H. E. Shacklock Building, 595–625 Princes St (Category II). The only listed manufacturing building in Princes Street, the Shacklock building covers a large site at the southern end of Princes Street opposite the Market Reserve.

The Cargill Monument at John Wickliffe Plaza is also listed (Category I), as are numerous buildings and structures which lie close to the intersection of side roads with Princes Street (e.g., the Category I Crown Roller Mills Building in Manor Place and the Category II Dowling Street Steps). The Manor Place Conveniences, 1912 public urinals at the intersection of Manor Place, Hope Street and Princes Street, are Category II listed since July 2023.

== See also ==
- Colombo Street, Christchurch
- History of Dunedin
- Lambton Quay, Wellington
- List of historic places in Dunedin
- Princes Street, Edinburgh
- Queen Street, Auckland
