= Dunedin Gasworks Museum =

Museum in Dunedin, New Zealand

Coordinates: 45°53′35″S 170°30′09″E

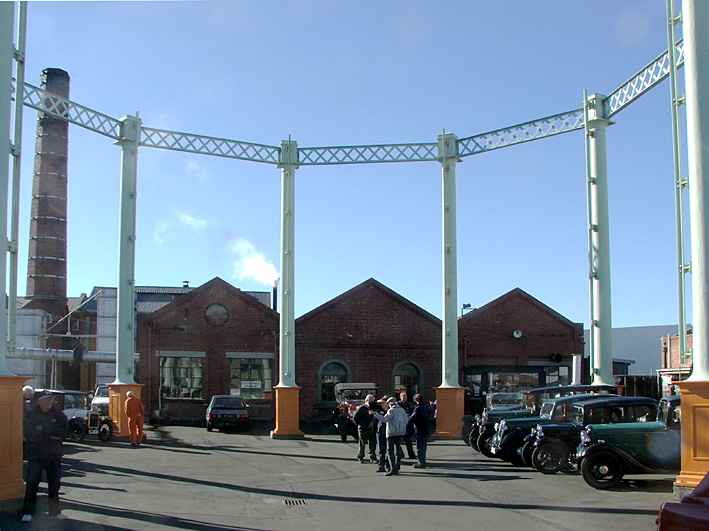
Dunedin Gasworks Museum

Dunedin Gasworks Museum is located in South Dunedin, in the South Island of New Zealand. It is one of only a few known preserved gasworks museums in the world.

The main part of the museum is housed in the engine house of the former Dunedin Gasworks in Braemar Street, close to Cargill's Corner, which operated from 1863 until 1987. Other buildings which are included in the museum include the boiler room, boiler house, chimney stack, fitting shop, and blacksmith's shop. The museum includes a unique collection of five stationary steam engines, at least some of which are in working full order. There are also displays of domestic and industrial gas appliances. As well as being an operating museum open to the public, the gasworks museum is also a popular venue for event ranging from music performances to gatherings of steampunk enthusiasts.

The Dunedin Gasworks were the first in New Zealand and also the last to cease production. At its peak in the 1970s coal gas was provided to over 18,000 customers in the city. The Edwardian buildings of the gasworks were saved by a trust headed by Elizabeth Hinds, Director of the Otago Settlers Museum, and several are now listed by the New Zealand Historic Places Trust as Category I Historic Places.

Much of Dunedin's gasworks facility was pulled down during the 1980s. The idea of restoring the remaining part of the complex into a museum was mooted during the latter part of the decade, with the first work on structural restoration of the buildings beginning in 1989. The museum was opened on 3 February 2001 in a ceremony attended by George Emerson, Chair of the Dunedin Gasworks Museum Trust, and Sir Neil Cossons, Chairman of English Heritage.

== Damage to chimney ==
The museum was forced to temporarily close in April 2025 when cracks were found in the historic gasworks chimney on the site, likely the result of a magnitude 6.8 earthquake south of the South Island late the previous month. In May, work began on dismantling the top of the chimney so that it could be repaired.
