= Manor Place Conveniences =

Coordinates: 45°52′27″S 170°30′20″E

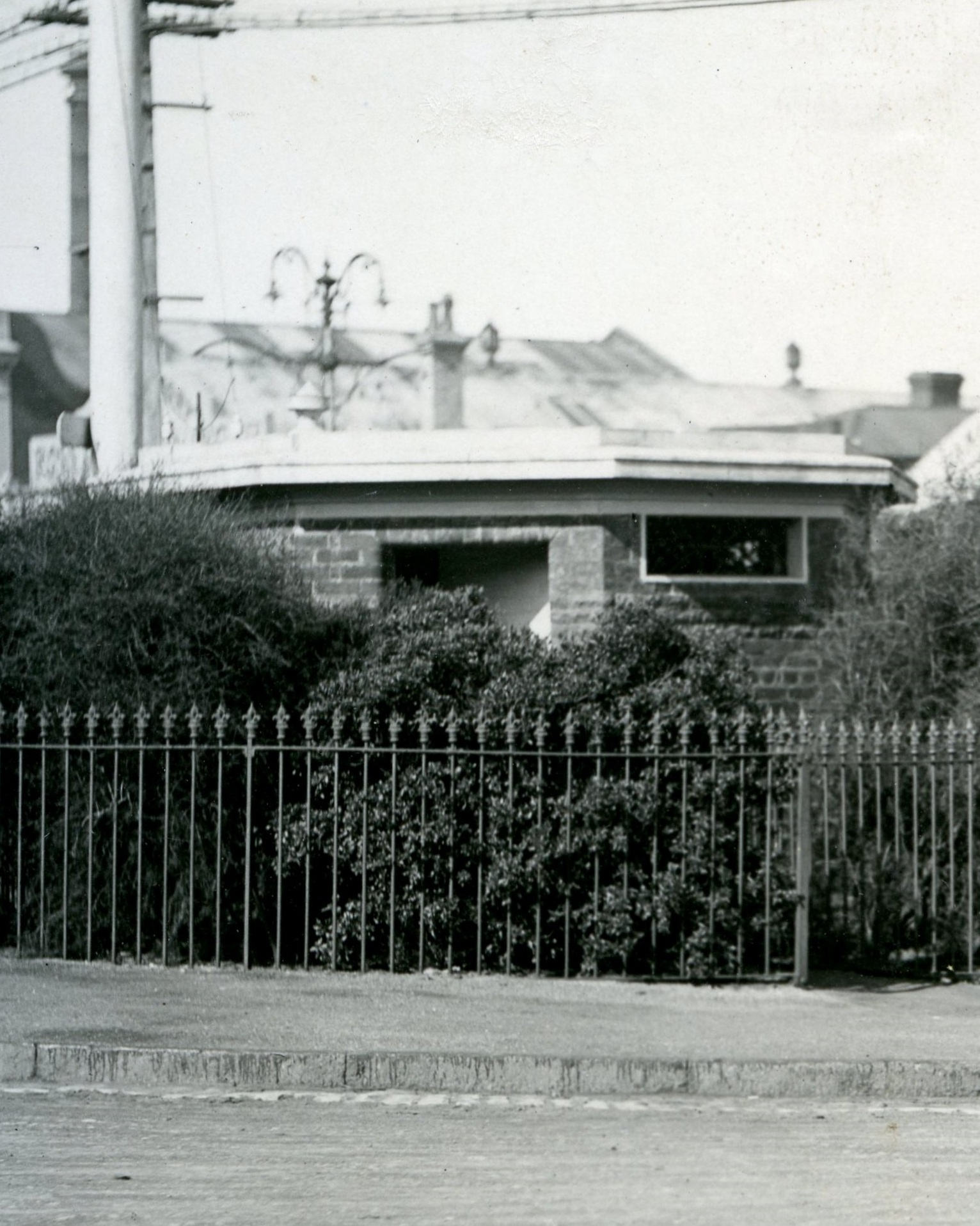
- The conveniences, deliberately screened by vegetation, as they appeared in 1919.
- Interactive map of the Manor Place Conveniences area

General information
- Architectural style: Edwardian
- Location: Intersection of Manor Place, Hope Street, Princes Street, Dunedin, New Zealand
- Year built: 1912
- Owner: Dunedin City Council

Design and construction
- Architect: George William Gough (1863–1936)

Heritage New Zealand – Category 2
- Official name: Manor Place Conveniences
- Designated: 7 July 2023
- Reference no.: 9840

The Manor Place Conveniences is a building in Dunedin, New Zealand, registered as a Category 2 historic place by Heritage New Zealand. It is the only Edwardian urinal in New Zealand with its original interior.

== History ==
By the early 1900s, the previously run-down reserve at Manor Place had been beautified, and a bandstand constructed. The council considered that the urinals that had been built in 1876 were letting the area down, and new facilities were proposed after a public petition. The proposal was meant to include toilets for women and men, as at that time women only had available public facilities at St Clair beach and in the Octagon. The building was constructed in 1912, and again included only urinals.

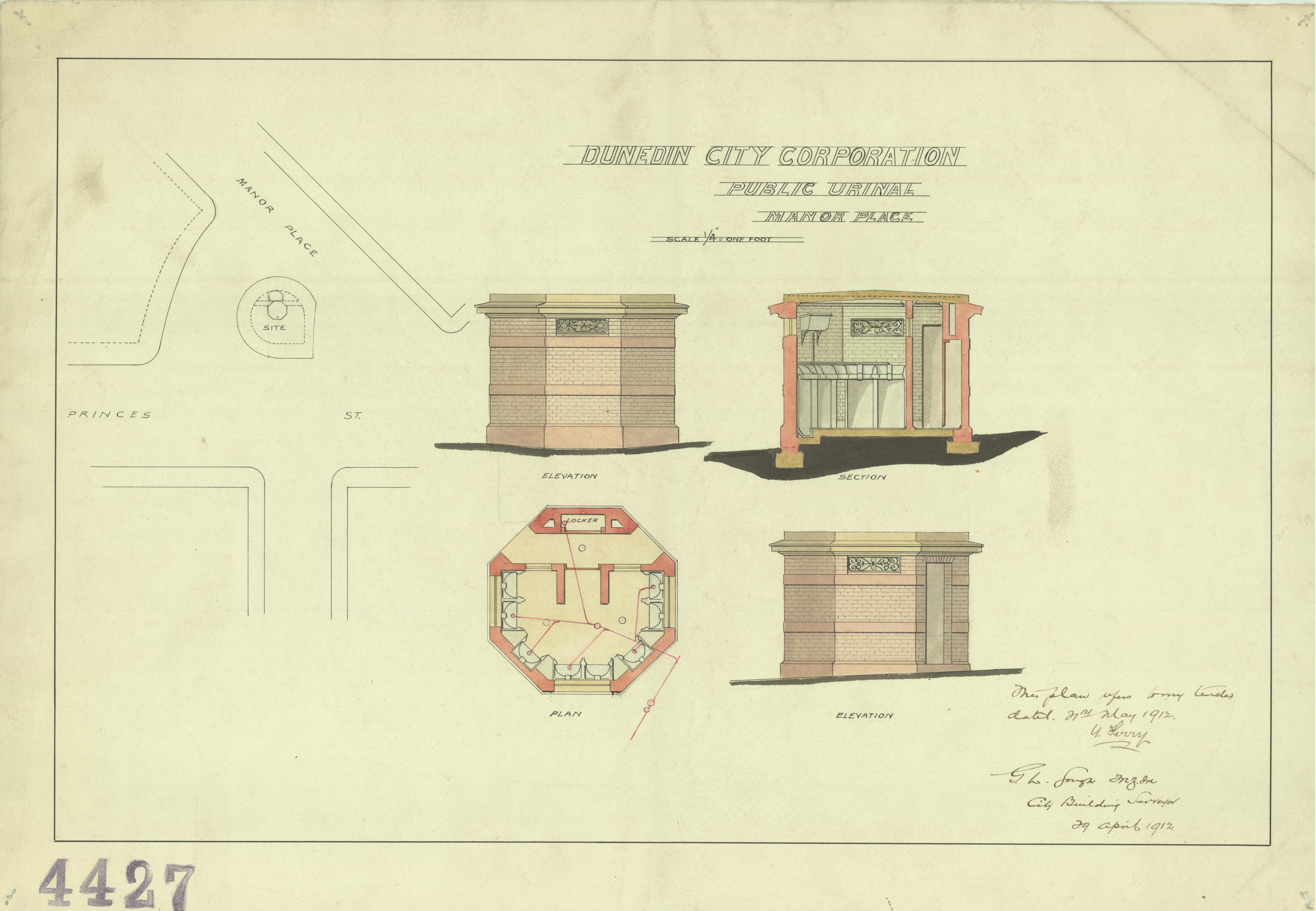
Architectural plans by G. W. Gough, 1912

The building was designed by the council surveyor, architect George William Gough, and built by August Ferry. Heritage assessor Alison Breese, who wrote her master's thesis on Dunedin's underground toilets, notes that it is not recorded who made the decision to build the toilets in an octagonal shape, or why.

The interior features wall-to-wall white tiles, including some Arts and Crafts-style feature tiles, marble surfaces, Twyford "Adamant" ceramic urinals and toilet roll holders made from kauri.

The conveniences were closed to the public in 1976, although they were used by bus drivers after this point.

== Heritage listing ==
The building was listed as a Category 2 historic place by Heritage New Zealand in 2023. The listing records that there are no other early urinals like this left in New Zealand with their original interior, and calling it "a rare surviving record of the major achievements and thinking of early 20th Century sanitation, public health, technology, and city design". In the 2023 Southern Heritage Festival, a walking tour of Dunedin's conveniences began at the pub 'The Bog' on George Street and finished at the Manor Place Conveniences.
