= List of historic places in Palmerston North =

The following list of historic places in Palmerston North contains buildings and structures listed in the New Zealand Historic Places Trust in Palmerston North, New Zealand.

== List of historic places ==
| Category | Name | Address | Photo | Commons |
|---|---|---|---|---|
| I | All Saints' Church (Anglican) | The Square and Church Street | | Category:All Saints Church, Palmerston North on Wikimedia Commons |
| II | Ansett Tower (Former T & G Building)kain | Broadway 16–22 | | Category:CategoryNameOnCommons on Wikimedia Commons |
| I | Caccia-Birch | Te Awe Awe Street 112–130 | | Category:Caccia-Birch on Wikimedia Commons |
| I | Cathedral of the Holy Spirit (Catholic) | Broadway Avenue 197 | | Category:Cathedral of the Holy Spirit, Palmerston North on Wikimedia Commons |
| II | Chief Post Office (Former) | The Square 473-483 and Main Street | | Category:Chief Post Office, Palmerston North on Wikimedia Commons |
| II | Coronation Memorial Fountain | The Square | | Category:Coronation Memorial Fountain on Wikimedia Commons |
| II | Palmerston North City Library (former DIC Building) | The Square 4–9 | | Category:Palmerston North City Library on Wikimedia Commons |
| I | Grand Hotel Building (Former) | The Square and Church Street 41–44 | | Category:Grand Hotel, Palmerston North on Wikimedia Commons |
| II | Hitching Post | The Square | | Category:Hitching Post, Palmerston North on Wikimedia Commons |
| I | Hoffman Oblong Continuous Kiln | Featherston Street 615 | | |
| II | Hokowhitu School | Albert Street 231 | | |
| II | House | Russell Street and Grey Street 170 | | Category:House, 170 Russell Street, Palmerston North on Wikimedia Commons |
| II | House | Ranfurly Street 28 | | Category:House, NZ Heritage list 1263 on Wikimedia Commons |
| II | House | Ranfurly Street 40 | | Category:House, NZ Heritage list 2851 on Wikimedia Commons |
| II | House | Ranfurly Street 42 | | Category:House, NZ Heritage list 2852 on Wikimedia Commons |
| II | House | Ranfurly Street 44 | | Category:House, NZ Heritage list 2853 on Wikimedia Commons |
| II | House | Ruahine Street 239 | | Category:House, NZ Heritage list 2854 on Wikimedia Commons |
| II | House | Ruahine Street 241 | | Category:House, NZ Heritage list 2855 on Wikimedia Commons |
| II | House (Formerly Guy Homestead) | Guy Avenue 16 | | Category:Guy Homestead on Wikimedia Commons |
| II | Kaingahou | Pioneer Highway 642 | | Category:Kaingahou, Palmerston North on Wikimedia Commons |
| I | Old Dairy Factory | Dairy Farm Road | | Category:Old Dairy Factory on Wikimedia Commons |
| II | Palmerston North Police Station (Former) | Church Street 351–361 | | Category:Former Police Station, Palmerston North on Wikimedia Commons |
| II | Post Office (early portion) | Park Road, Victoria Esplanade Gardens | | Category:Post Office (former), Palmerston North on Wikimedia Commons |
| II | Queen Elizabeth Technical College (Former) | King Street 135 | | Category:Queen Elizabeth Technical College on Wikimedia Commons |
| II | Rangi Marie | Rangiora Avenue 3 | | |
| I | Regent Theatre | Broadway Avenue 59–71 | | Category:Regent Theatre, Palmerston North on Wikimedia Commons |
| II | Soldiers Club Building (Former) | George Street and 236 Cuba Street 5–7 | | Category:Soldiers Club Building, Palmerston North on Wikimedia Commons |
| II | Steeles Building (Former) | The Square 137 | | Category:Steeles Building on Wikimedia Commons |
| II | Stubbs Jewellers Building (Former) | The Square 138–139 | | Category:Stubbs Jewellers Building on Wikimedia Commons |
| II | Te Peeti Te Awe Awe Memorial | The Square | | Category:Te Peeti Awe Awe Memorial on Wikimedia Commons |
| II | United Manawatu Lodge | Broadway Avenue 186 | | Category:United Manawatu Lodge on Wikimedia Commons |
| II | Ward Brothers Building | Cuba Street 213 | | Category:Ward Brothers Building on Wikimedia Commons |
| II | Wharerata | Riverbank Road, Massey University Campus | | Category:Wharerata on Wikimedia Commons |
