= Cargill Monument =

Monument in Dunedin, New Zealand

Coordinates: 45°52′39.6″S 170°30′06.7″E

- Interactive map of Cargill Monument
- Designer: Charles Robert Swyer
- Type: Sculpture
- Completion date: 1863

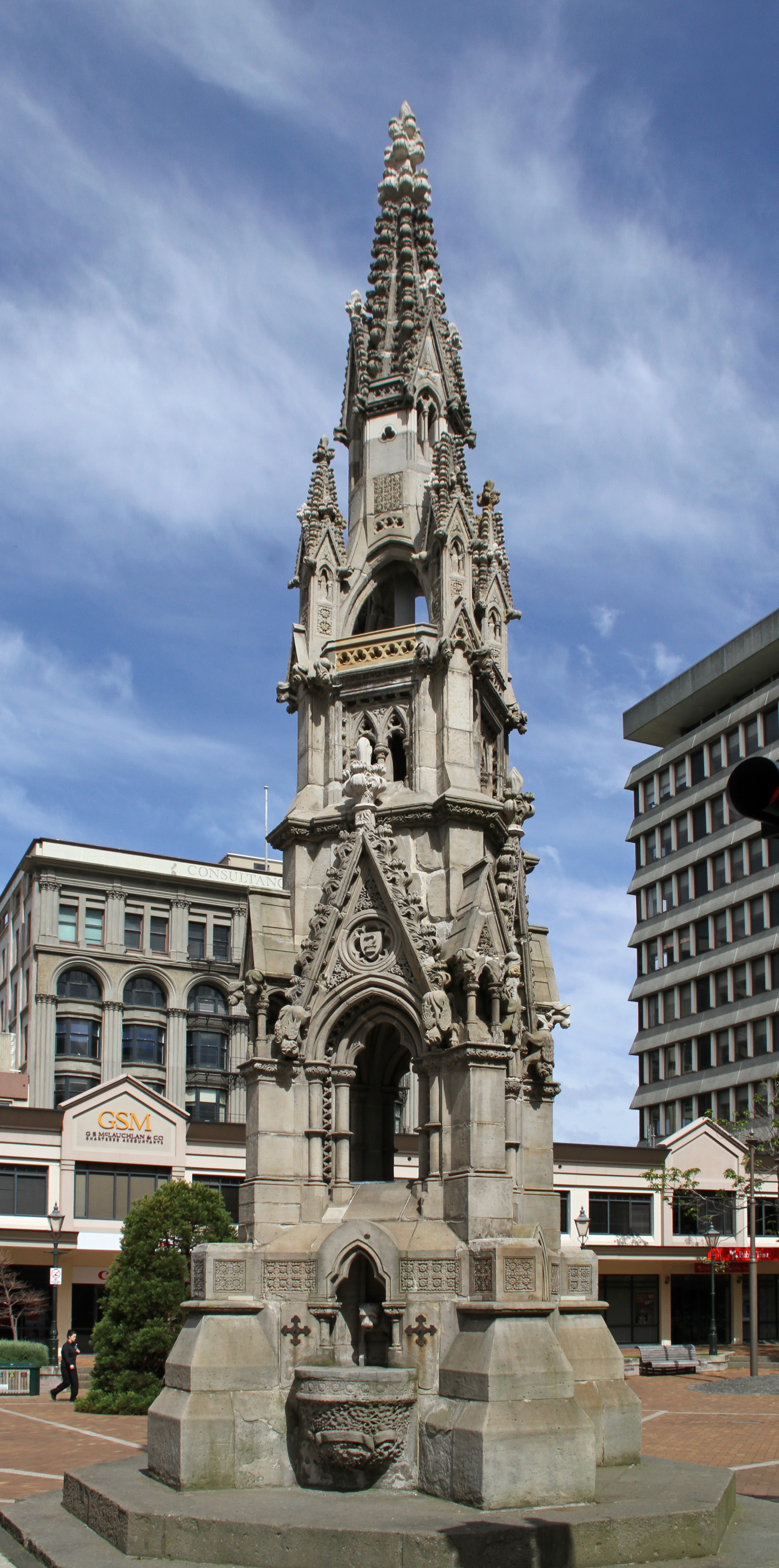
The Cargill Monument is a prominent feature of John Wickliffe Plaza, Dunedin

The Cargill Monument is a notable public monument in central Dunedin, New Zealand. It is dedicated to the city's founding father, Captain William Cargill, and is approximately 7.5 metres (25 ft) in height.

The monument was designed by Charles Robert Swyer and built in 1863–64, using Tasmanian sandstone, on a base of locally sourced phonolite. The design, in Gothic Revival style, was possibly partly inspired by Edinburgh's Scott Monument, and features delicate carved lacework and grotesques. Its design, strikingly similar to the Martyrs' memorial in Oxford, England, was compared by contemporary architect Nathaniel Wales to that of England's Eleanor crosses. The design also originally featured drinking fountains, but they have been unused for many years.

The monument was originally located in the city's centre, The Octagon, and was surrounded with railings, but it was moved to its current site (sans railings) in The Exchange in 1872. It now stands at the corner of Princes Street and Rattray Street on John Wickliffe Plaza.

A plaque at the foot of the monument marks the location of the first Salvation Army meeting in New Zealand, held at the site in April 1883.

The Cargill Monument is Category I listed in the register of Heritage New Zealand.
