= Henry Shacklock =

New Zealand inventor (1839–1902)

Henry Ely Shacklock (21 June 1839 – 17 December 1902) was an iron moulder and manufacturer in colonial New Zealand. In 1873, he designed and built the first of thousands of cast iron coal ranges that, after various modifications, became the backbone of his business. The company he founded, H.E. Shacklock Ltd., went on to produce the first electric range in New Zealand in 1925.

== Background ==
Shacklock was born in Kirkby-in-Ashfield, Nottinghamshire, England, and served his apprenticeship in several foundries in Nottingham and Derby. Unsatisfied with the opportunities available to him in England, he emigrated to New Zealand and arrived in Port Chalmers aboard the Bombay on 9 September 1862. Shacklock first gained a job cutting scrub on the Otago Peninsula before his fiancée, Elizabeth Bradley, came to join him in New Zealand. He lived in Oamaru for a time, before returning to Dunedin and settling on an adjoining section on Grosvenor Street and Park Terrace. He eventually set up his own foundry on Princes Street in January 1872.

== Shacklock Orion coal range ==
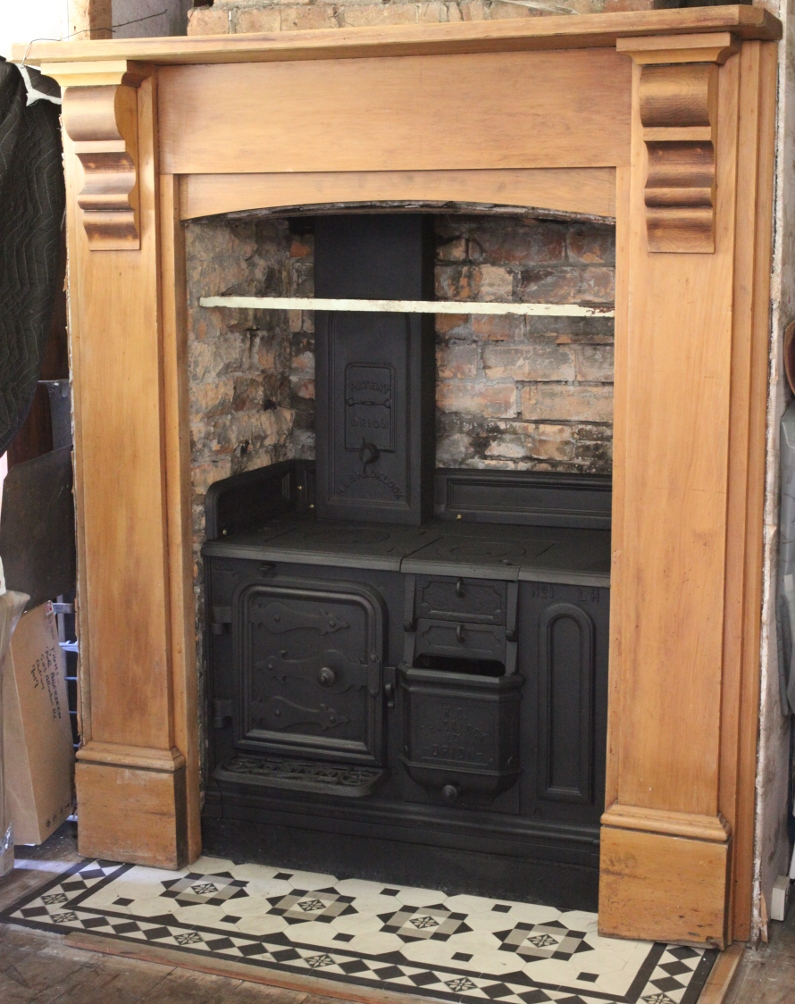
Shacklock 'Orion' coal range

In 1873, following requests from his clients and dissatisfaction with his own imported range, Shacklock designed and manufactured a prototype cast iron coal range. He built a "self setting" stove, with specially designed grates and flues, that burned lignite coal, unlike the British and American kitset imports which were designed to run on bituminous coal. That design was continually improved and modified, becoming an appliance that warmed kitchens, heated water, baked scones and cooked porridge throughout thousands of New Zealand homes. Shacklock named his design the "Orion" due to his interest in astronomy.

Before patenting the range in 1882, Shacklock introduced many features to appeal to potential customers. The curves and angles were designed for aesthetics as well as strength. The fire doors would stay open by themselves, the chimney and flue damper could be removed for cleaning, and the door was also made with varying thicknesses to distribute the heat evenly. By the late 1880s, the Orion range grew to include many different models. Those included double ovens, and ones featuring a "destructor" firebox that was advertised as a safe and hygienic way of disposing of kitchen waste.

== H.E. Shacklock Ltd ==
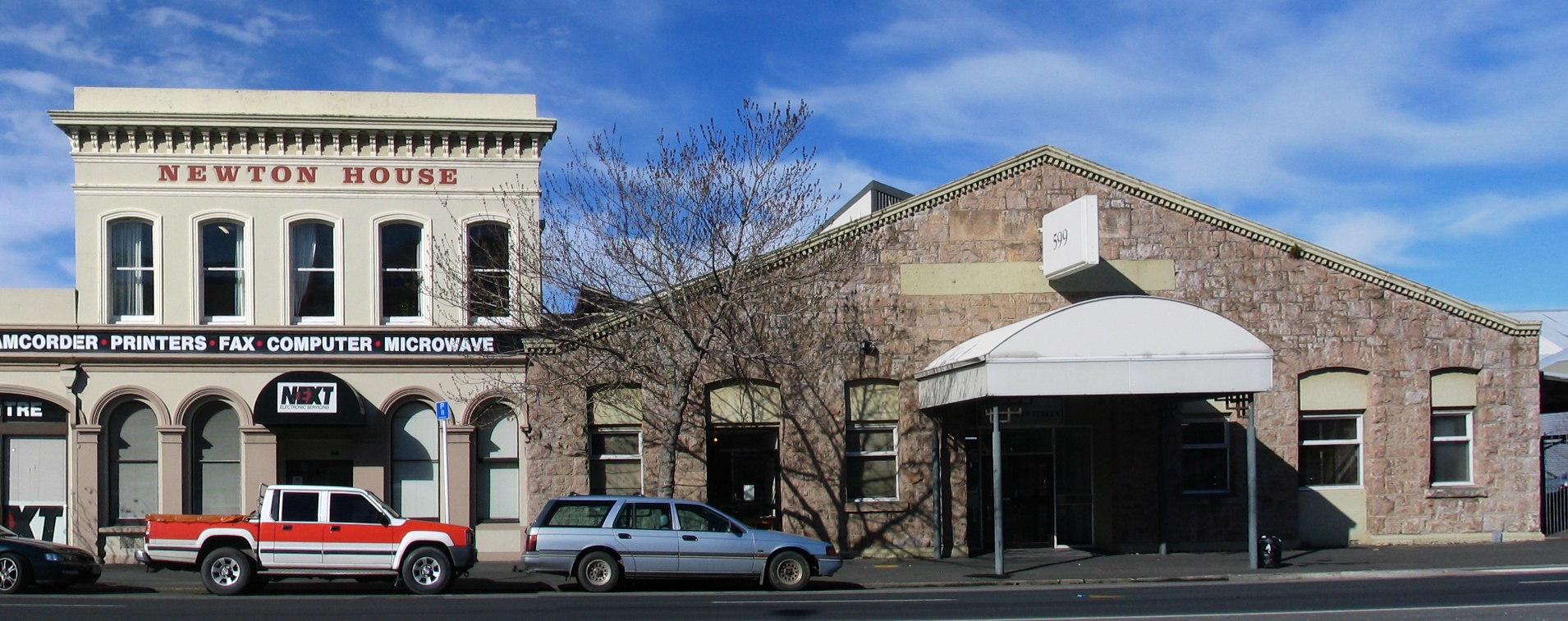
The historic H. E. Shacklock buildings in Princes Street, Dunedin

Shacklock was a pioneer in the manufacturing of coal ranges. The Orion range was the main line produced and, by 1894, the company's appliances were being sold throughout New Zealand. The limited liability company of H.E. Shacklock Ltd was formed in 1900 with a capital value of 25,000 pounds. For as long as coal remained the main source of energy, H.E. Shacklock was the market leader in producing solid fuel ranges and heaters.

In the late 1890s, Shacklock became increasingly ill. He suffered from bouts of depression and gradually withdrew from an active role in the company he created. On 17 December 1902, he hanged himself in his Dunedin home. The company went on to produce New Zealand's first electric stove in 1925 but struggled to modernise its operations. In 1955, Auckland company Fisher and Paykel Ltd acquired H. E. Shacklock Ltd., but the brand continued to dominate the New Zealand domestic appliance market through the era of government protectionism. Fisher and Paykel gradually phased out the Shacklock name from its products.

The original H. E. Shacklock Ltd. buildings in Princes Street, Dunedin, are listed as a Category II historic place by Heritage New Zealand.
