= Empire Hotel, Dunedin =

New Zealand heritage building in Dunedin

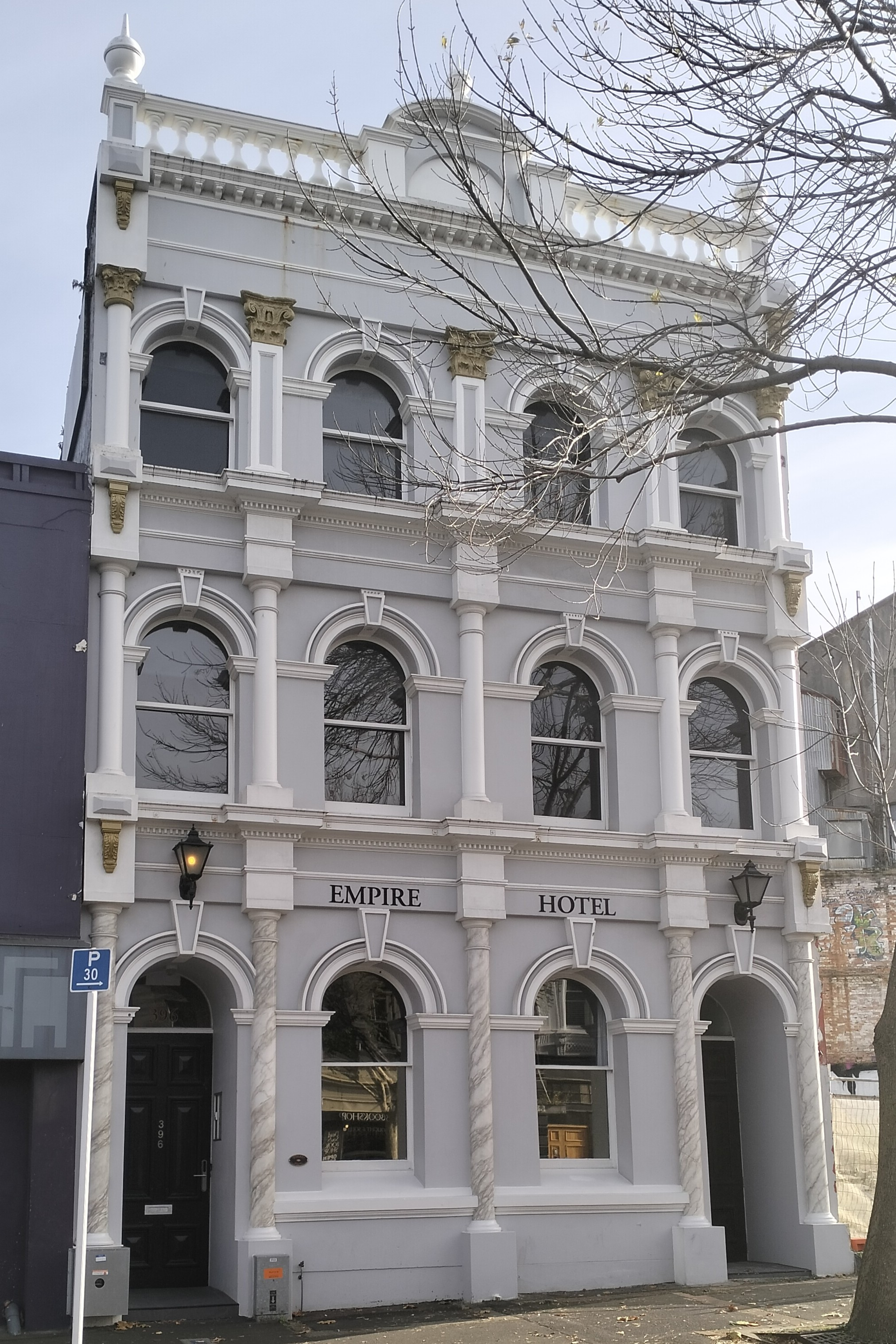
- The restored facade of the Empire Hotel in 2025
- Former names: The Queen's Arms, Union Hotel, Empire Tavern

General information
- Location: 396 Princes Street, Central Dunedin, New Zealand
- Coordinates: 45.880143°S 170.499885°E
- Opened: 1858

The Empire Hotel (also known as the Empire Tavern) is a historic building at 396 Princes Street, Dunedin, New Zealand, located some 700 metres southwest of the city centre. It served as a public house from the 1850s until the 1990s, then underwent restoration and conversion to apartments in the 2010s. It has a New Zealand Historic Places Trust category 1 listing.

== History ==
The Empire Hotel has long played a major role in Dunedin culture. Originally established by J.W. Feger and named The Queen's Arms, it was built on its present site in 1858, only 10 years after the founding of Dunedin. At that time, before much of the harbourside land was reclaimed, its site near the city's main wharf made it a central gathering place providing accommodation, food, and drink. When the Otago gold rush broke, three years later, it became the central building in a thriving entertainment district. The current brick building, designed by Thomas Bedford Cameron, replaced the original structure in 1879. The name was changed to the Union Hotel in 1890, and then to the Empire Hotel in 1898.

The tavern became a pivotal venue for the development of Dunedin's distinctive music scene of the 1980s, known worldwide as the Dunedin sound. Under the ownership of John and Maureen Simpson, the upstairs bar became a principal venue for performances by such bands as The Chills, The Verlaines and The Clean. Even now, several years after the closure of the venue, the Empire is still regarded by many as the home of the Dunedin sound:

"It is to this city what the Cavern Club is to Liverpool in terms of what it helped spawn, even if compared to the Beatles neither the bands who played in it, or the venue itself, is a household name…it cannot be underestimated the role the Empire played in nurturing a local music scene that is acknowledged within alternative music circles around the world." (Graeme Downes, founder of The Verlaines)

== The building ==
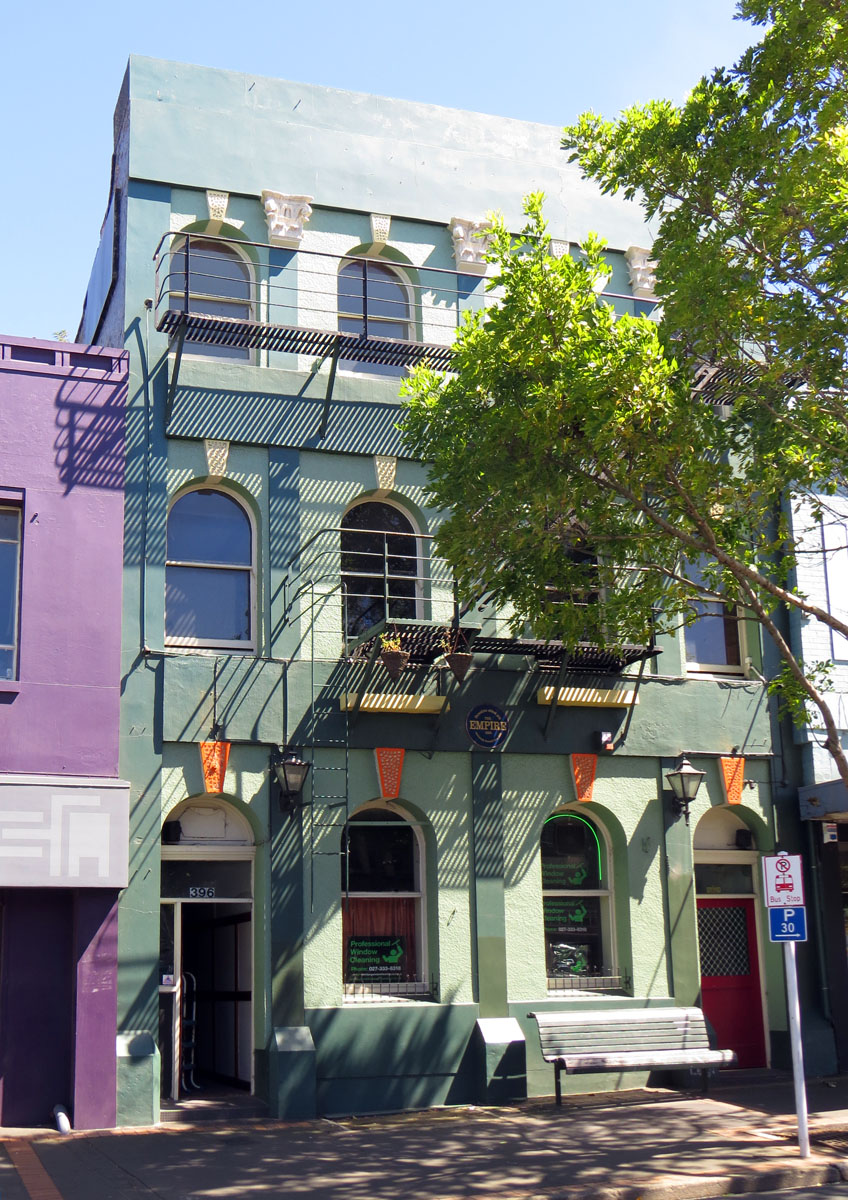
The Empire Hotel building in 2015, prior to restoration work.

The Empire Hotel is part of a historic precinct containing numerous Victorian and Edwardian buildings, several of which have NZHPT classification. Rising three storeys, for many years it had a plain, plastered frontage with a metal fire escape. Two arched entrance doors stand at either end of the ground-level frontage. The hotel was originally built with more decoration on its façade, but much of this was removed during the late 20th century. Several of the building's interior features and fittings were formerly part of the now largely demolished Cargill's Castle.

The hotel closed in 2009 and was unused until 2015, when it was purchased by developer Jon Leng who refurbished the building. Many of the external features were replaced or rebuilt, including the restoration of columns, imposts, and cornices, plus an added roof parapet including a balustrade. The exterior fire escape, which had become dangerous, was also removed at this time. The historic facade was painted in the original colour scheme. The interior was converted a commercial space and apartments, and it was placed for sale in November 2024.
