= Wains Hotel =

Historic hotel in New Zealand

Coordinates: 45.87878°S 170.50075°E

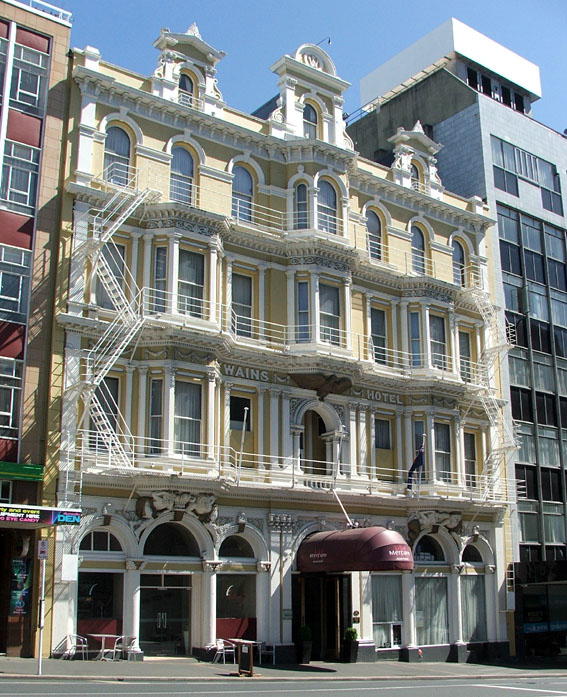
Wains Hotel Building

The Wains Hotel Building (frequently spelt grammatically but incorrectly as Wain's Hotel and currently operating as Fable Dunedin) is a historic hotel building in Dunedin, New Zealand.

Job Wain started his first hotel in downtown Dunedin in the 1860s, at the height of the Otago gold rush. Business flourished, and when the Commercial Bank next door closed Wain expanded his business into that building. He continued to buy nearby properties, and in 1878 contracted to have a major new structure — costing £14,000 — built in Princes Street, designed by Mason, Wales, & Stevenson. At that time, the Exchange area where the hotel was constructed was the heart of Dunedin's central business district, so it was very well positioned for major trade.

== The building ==
The Wains Hotel building has an Italianate style, with an elaborate façade noted for its columns, pilasters, and carved figures. At ground level, substantial columns of Port Chalmers basalt breccia rise, topped with capitals of Kakanui limestone. These columns support arches above which sit carved figures of Bacchus, Neptune, and mermaids. The entranceway is topped by a stone balustrade featuring an eagle as its keystone. The upper storeys are equally ornate. Inside, doors and fittings of Tasmanian blackwood complemented the exterior's grandeur.

The building is classified as a Category I historic place by the New Zealand Historic Places Trust.

== Current use ==
In 2018 the building was refurbished, and opened as a 50-room boutique five-star hotel, Fable Dunedin. The hotel, part of the Fable Hotel Group, includes a restaurant, bar, gym, and meeting facilities.

The hotel was one of the shooting locations for the 2022 film The Royal Treatment.
