= New Zealand and South Seas International Exhibition =

World fair held in Dunedin, New Zealand 1926–1926

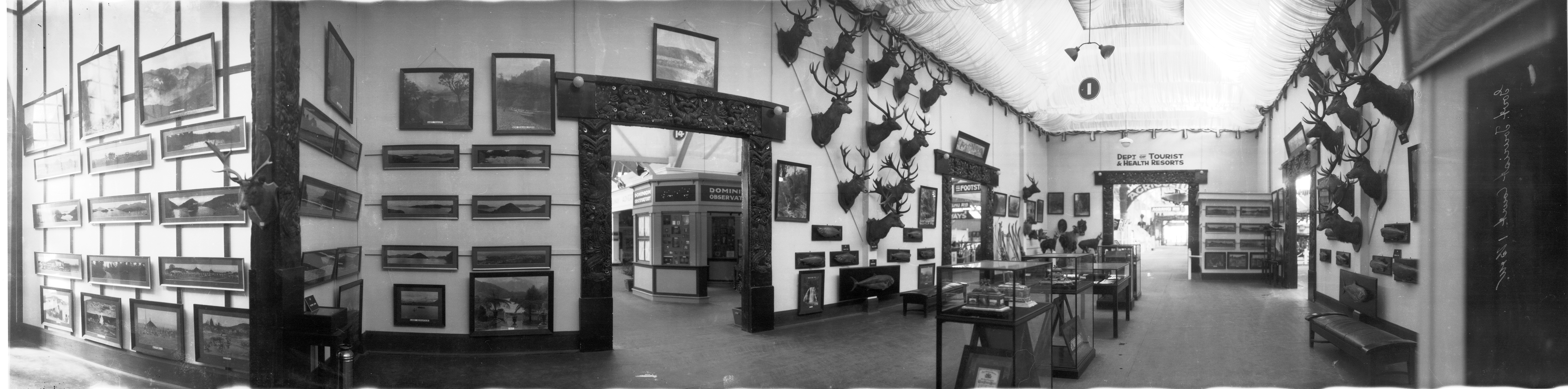
- The Government Tourist Court at the exhibition

Overview
- BIE-class: Unrecognized exposition
- Name: New Zealand and South Seas International Exhibition
- Area: 6.5 ha
- Visitors: 3,200,498

Location
- Country: New Zealand
- City: Dunedin
- Venue: Logan Park

Timeline
- Opening: 17 November 1925
- Closure: 1 May 1926

The New Zealand and South Seas International Exhibition was a world's fair held in Dunedin, New Zealand, from 17 November 1925 until 1 May 1926, celebrating New Zealand and the South Seas. It was the third such exhibition held in Dunedin, with earlier exhibitions in 1865 and 1889. The exhibition had over 3 million visitors. It had added a new 'Special Exhibits' section focusing on art and craftwork made by women, a breakthrough that lifted the profile of women's art and craftwork.

== Description ==
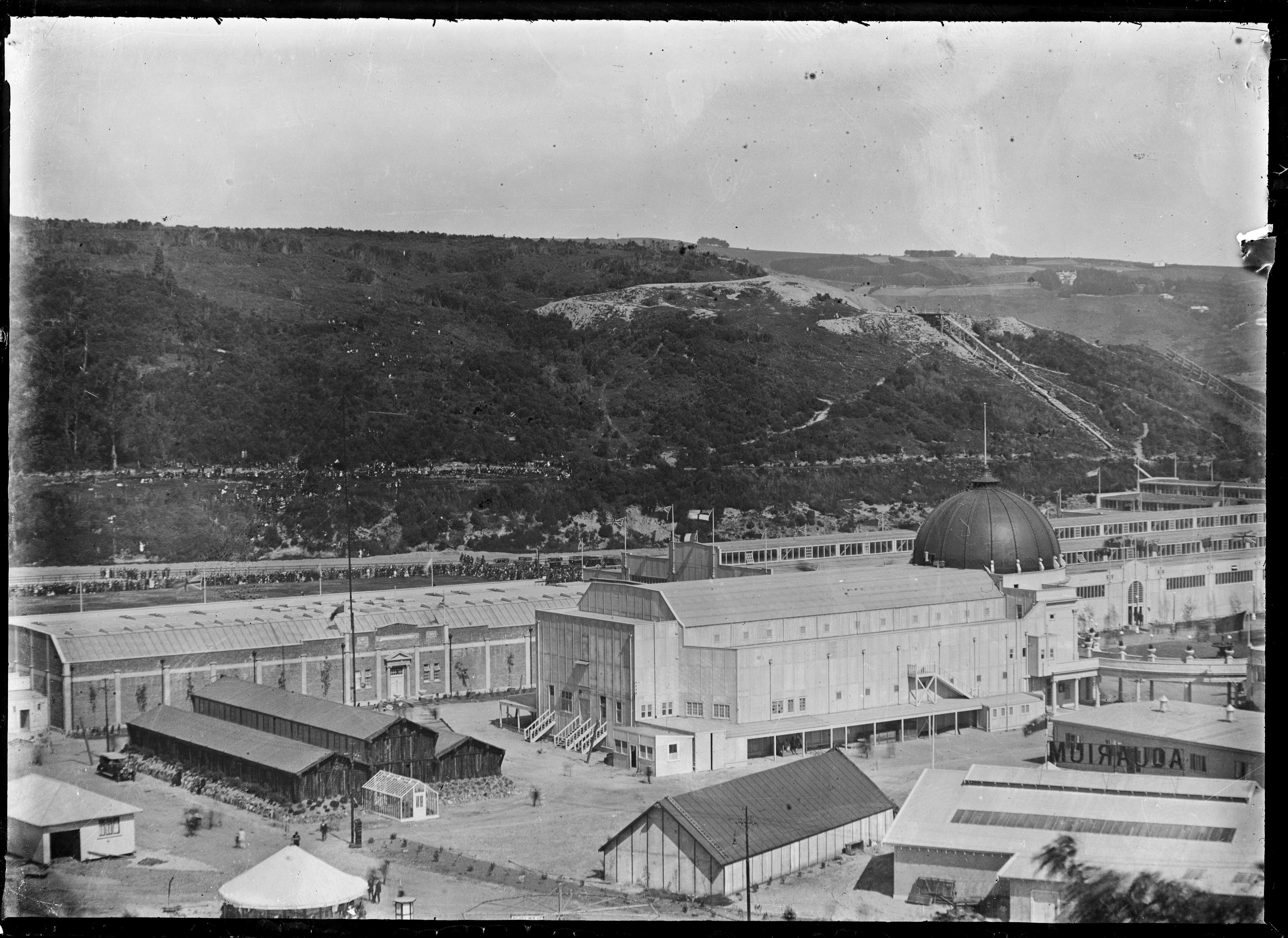
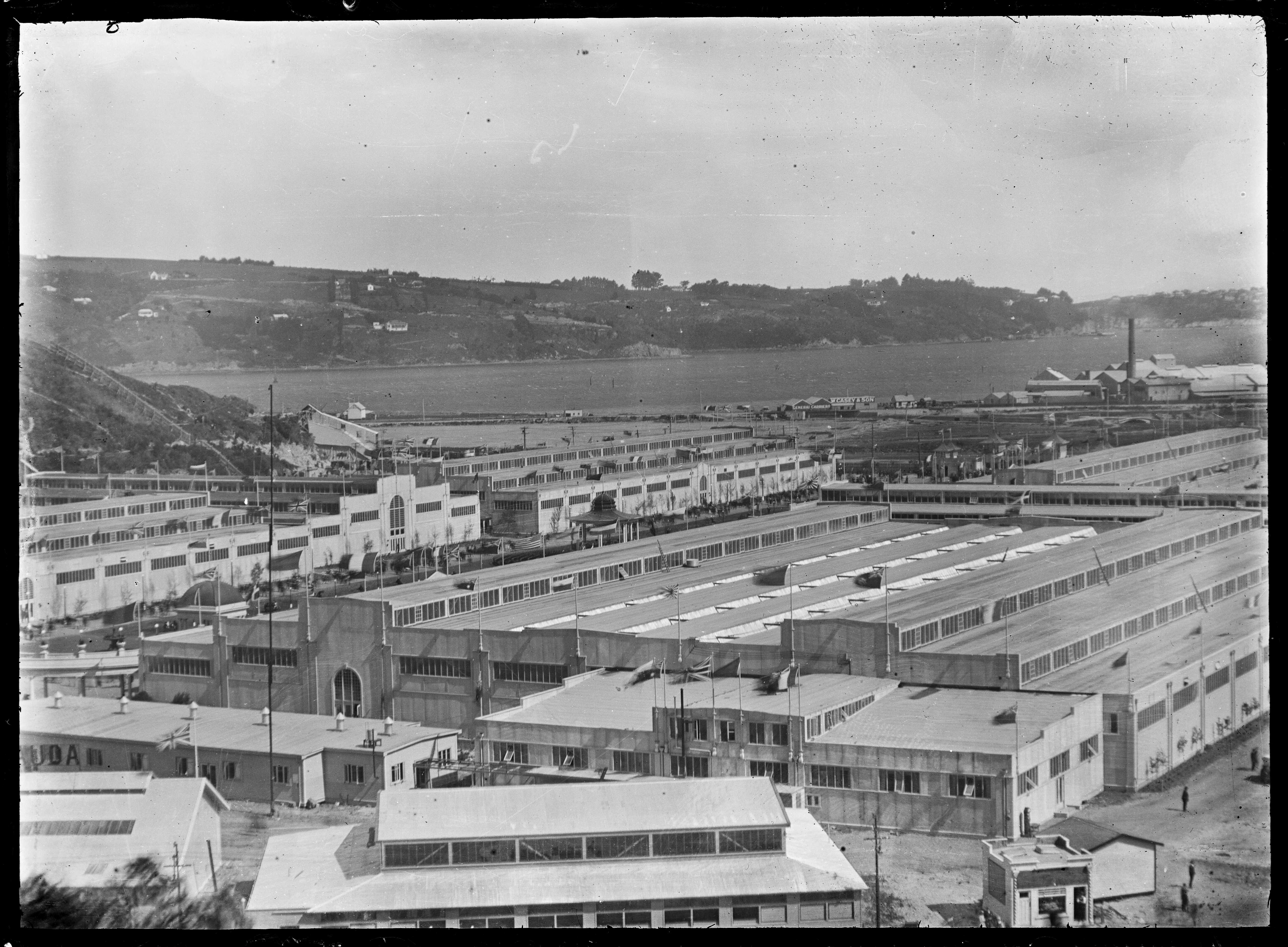
Panorama of exhibition in November 1925

The 1925–1926 exhibition was held on reclaimed land at Logan Park, much of it reclaimed especially for the exhibition. A tidal inlet originally known as Pelichet Bay had been partly reclaimed, leaving a flat area and a lake, Lake Logan. In order to provide enough land for the exhibition, the lake was drained and the site cleared before construction of a series of magnificent exhibition buildings by architect Edmund Anscombe. The buildings consisted of a series of pavilions surrounding a central court area which was dominated by a domed festival hall, and covered an area of 16 acres (6.5 ha). A new tree-lined road linking the exhibition grounds with the city centre was completed, and now forms Anzac Avenue.

The exhibition grounds and buildings included an amusement park with a quarter-mile scenic railway loop, restaurant, and tearooms, along with displays from both New Zealand provinces and overseas countries, with "courts" set up by the United Kingdom, Canada, Australia, and Fiji. The exhibition was opened by the Governor-General, Sir Charles Fergusson, in November 1925, and remained open until the middle of the following year. Although the country's population at the time was only 1,250,000, a total of more than 3,000,000 visitors paid for admission to the exhibition. Even in its closing stages, the exhibition was popular; the final day's attendance was a record 83,935.

The exhibition was commemorated in a set of three stamps issued by the New Zealand Post Office, designed by H Linley Richardson. The set was one of New Zealand's first commemorative stamp issues, and also one of very few from the country to be printed on coloured paper.

== Former art gallery ==
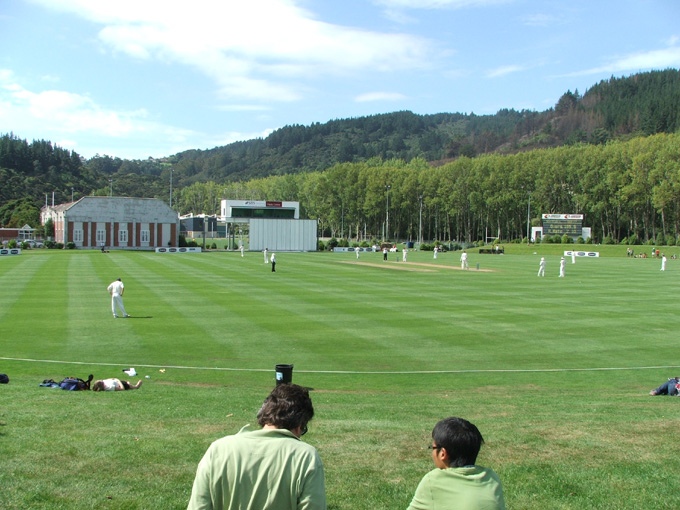
University Oval, with the former art gallery on the left

Little now remains of the exhibition venue and structure, other than Logan Park and Anzac Avenue themselves. The only remaining structure on the original site, the exhibition's art gallery, was bought at the conclusion of the exhibition by Sir Percy Sargood and his family, and donated to the city as an art gallery. The building remained the site of the Dunedin Public Art Gallery until a new site was completed for the gallery in the central city in 1996.

Some sections of some of the exhibitions buildings were sold to members of the public and moved to other sites, most notably a small domed structure now part of an art gallery at Brighton, to the south of Dunedin. After the Dunedin Public Art Gallery moved to its new site in the city centre in 1996, the building was shortened to allow for expansion to the neighbouring University Oval cricket ground. The remaining portions of the gallery are used by the New Zealand Academy of Sport and Sports Medicine New Zealand as a gym, training venue, and offices.

The former gallery building is the only remaining structure from any of the International Fairs held in New Zealand in the late 19th and early 20th centuries, and one of only some eight left from this era of world fairs worldwide. The building was designed by Edmund Anscombe, a driving force behind the staging of an exhibition in Dunedin, who was appointed official architect to the exhibition in 1924. The building has a Heritage New Zealand Category I classification.

== Former aquarium ==
When proposals for an aquarium were unable to be funded by the Acclimatisation Society or the City Corporation, George Howes (entomologist) and others registered a private company, Aquarium Ltd., "To carry on the business of an aquarium at the New Zealand and South Seas Exhibition at Dunedin." Aquarium Ltd. wound up at the end of the exhibition, and the aquarium building was taken on by the city. It was then purchased by the Otago Lawn Tennis Association. The aquarium tanks were relocated to the Dunedin Botanic Garden, along with the fernery from the exhibition, where they were used for housing fish until 1933.
