= Edmund Anscombe =

New Zealand architect (1874–1948)

- Anscombe c. 1920
- Born: 8 February 1874; Lindfield, Sussex, England
- Died: 9 October 1948 (aged 74); Wellington, New Zealand
- Occupation: Architect
- Buildings: 1925 New Zealand and South Seas International Exhibition, 1940 New Zealand Centennial Exhibition, Herd Street Post Office & Telegraph Building, Anscombe Flats, Empire Deluxe Theatre, Sargood Centre, various works on the University of Otago campus

Edmund Anscombe (8 February 1874 – 9 October 1948) was one of the most important figures to shape the architectural and urban fabric of New Zealand. He was important, not only because of the prolific nature of his practice and the quality of his work, but also because of the range and the scale of his built and speculative projects. These extended from conventional essays to monumental urban schemes informed by his international travel, especially in America. His influence was specifically felt in Dunedin, Wellington, and the rebuild of Hastings following the 1931 Hawkes Bay Earthquake. He also realised projects in Alexandra, Invercargill, Palmerston, Palmerston North, Rotorua, Waimate North and Wānaka. His key works include the 1925–26 New Zealand and South Seas International Exhibition, the 1940 New Zealand Centennial Exhibition, the Herd Street Post and Telegraph building, Anscombe Flats, the Empire Deluxe theatre and his work on the clocktower complex – including specifically the Archway Building and Marama Hall – effectively re-conceiving the design of the University of Otago's historical core (University of Otago Clocktower complex). His sister was painter Eliza Anscombe

== Biographical background ==
Anscombe was born on 8 February 1874 in Lindfield, Sussex, England. His parents Edmund and Eliza Anscombe (née Mason) emigrated on 27 June 1874 to New Zealand on the Christian McAusland in the assisted immigration scheme. They arrived in Dunedin with seven-month-old Edmund and his two-year-old sister Eliza. His father is described as a carpenter aged 25 years old from Sussex. His mother was 28. They arrived in Otago, New Zealand on 30 September 1874. His sister Edith Violet was born in Dunedin on 1 April 1885.

Edmund attended Caversham School (from 1879 to 1885) and in 1888, as a 14-year-old boy, he left New Zealand on what, in most accounts, is seen to be a prophetic visit to the 1888 Melbourne exhibition. In his own words:

"From then onwards anything pertaining to Exhibitions held for me its own decided and never ending interest." (Anscombe Inside Story)

This lifelong interest in the design of exhibition buildings was furthered by: his attendance at the 1889–90 New Zealand and South Seas Exhibition in Dunedin, involvement in the Louisiana Purchase Exposition, St Louis (1904), his appointment as architect to the New Zealand and South Seas International Exhibition Company (1924–25), attendance at the Chicago World's Fair (1933) and the New York World's Fair (1939), and his appointment as the architect of the New Zealand Centennial Exhibition (1940). Whether the exhibition was the primary reason for his visit to Melbourne cannot be known for certain, but on his return Anscombe became an apprentice carpenter in Waiwera South, Otago, and worked for his father as a builder. This experience perhaps influenced his later architectural work which he approached with an entrepreneurial pragmatism. He married Douglas Watt on 24 May 1898 in Kaihiku near Balclutha, after which they lived with Edmund's parents. Their first child, Ruby, was born 1899. In 1911 their second daughter, Marjory, was born. Their first daughter would marry a fellow architect in 1935; George F. Penlington was the grandson of William Penlington.

In 1901 Anscombe travelled to America. This 1901–1906 trip is the most written about of his travels. He visited St Louis Purchase Exposition where he "received ... practical training in exhibitions in 1904" and it is during this time that he is said to have studied architecture, an idea first asserted in an obituary but something Anscombe himself does not refer to.

== Architectural practice in Dunedin ==
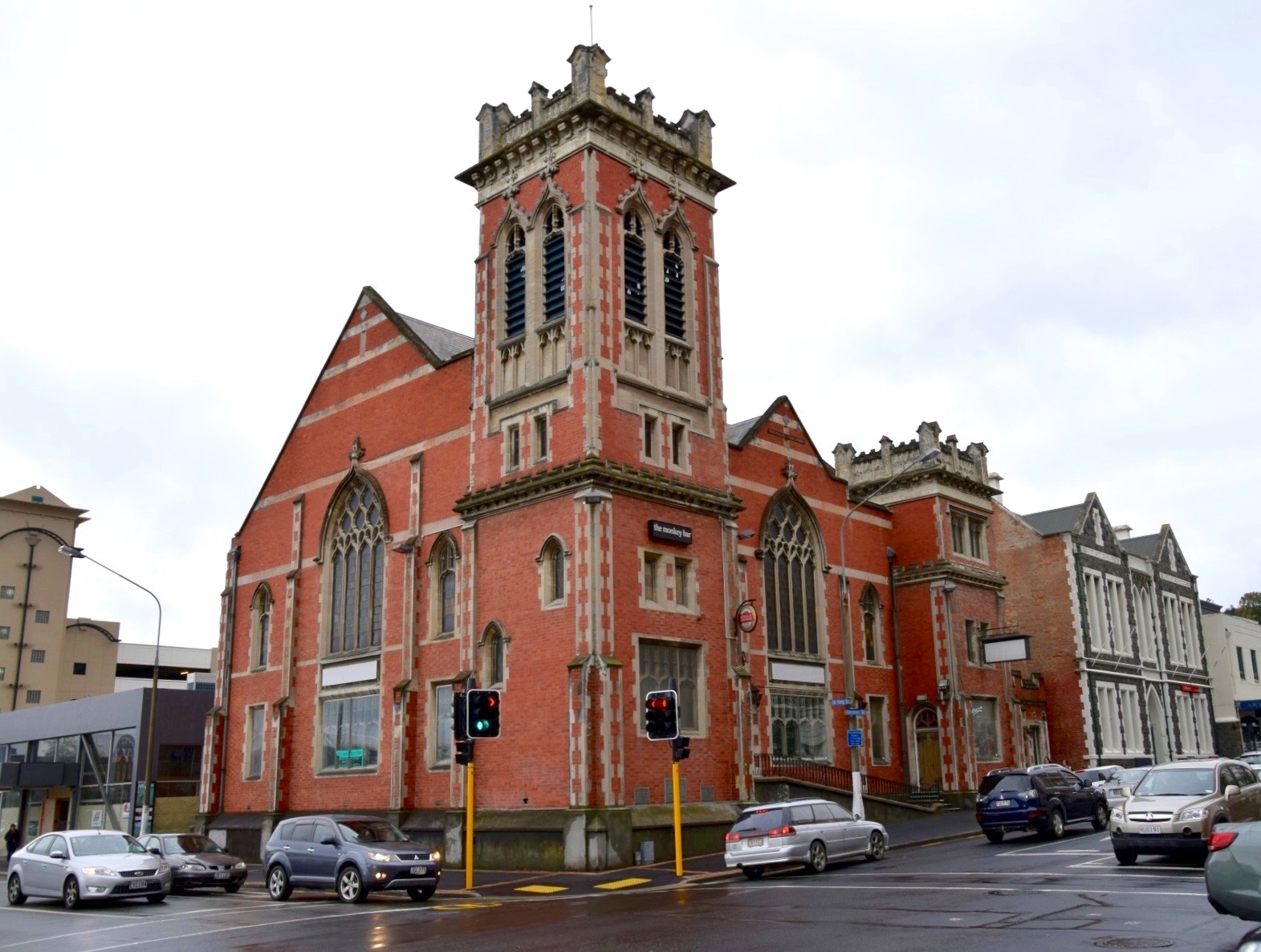
Hanover Street Baptist Church, Dunedin

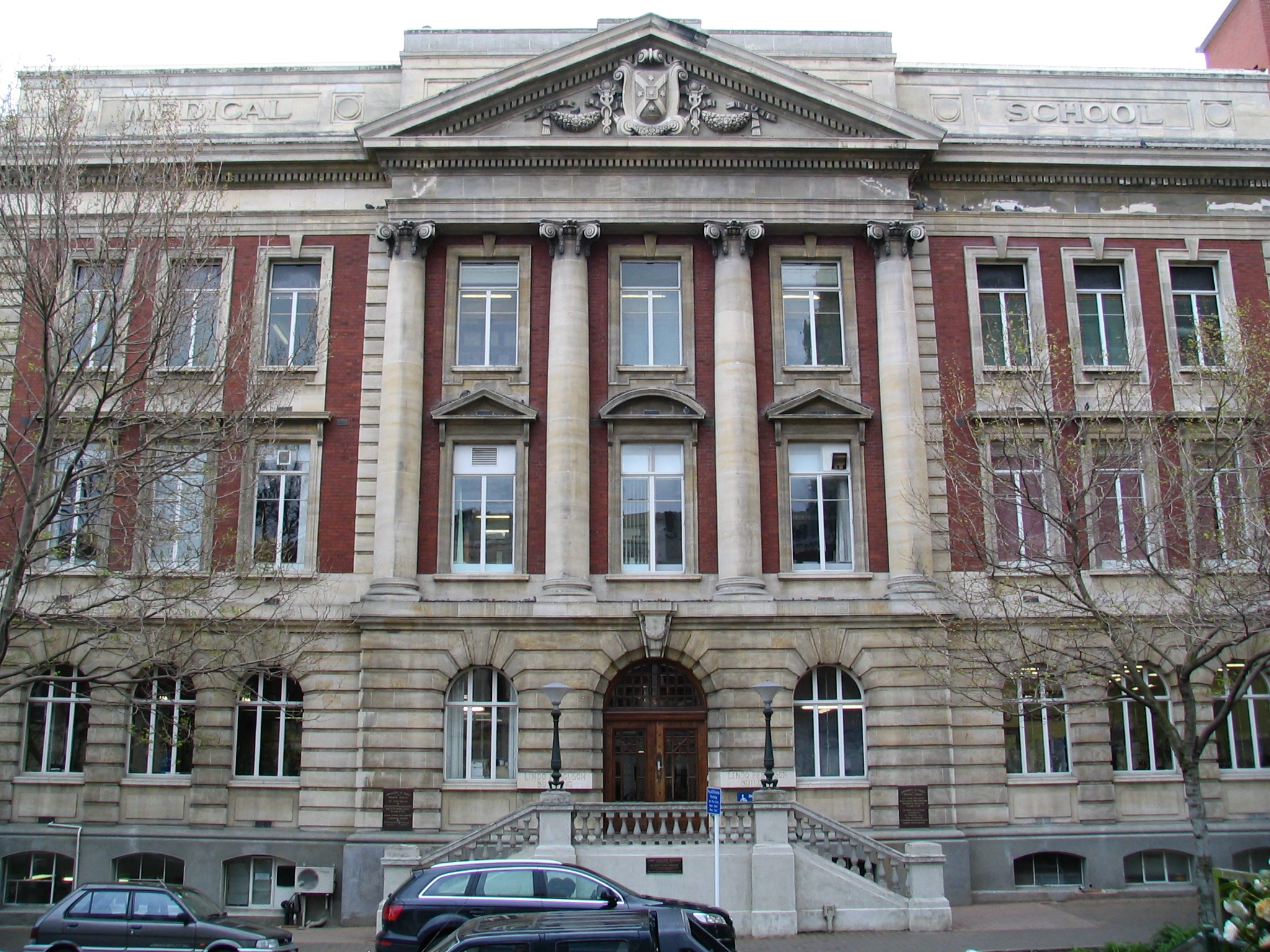
The Lindo-Ferguson building in Dunedin

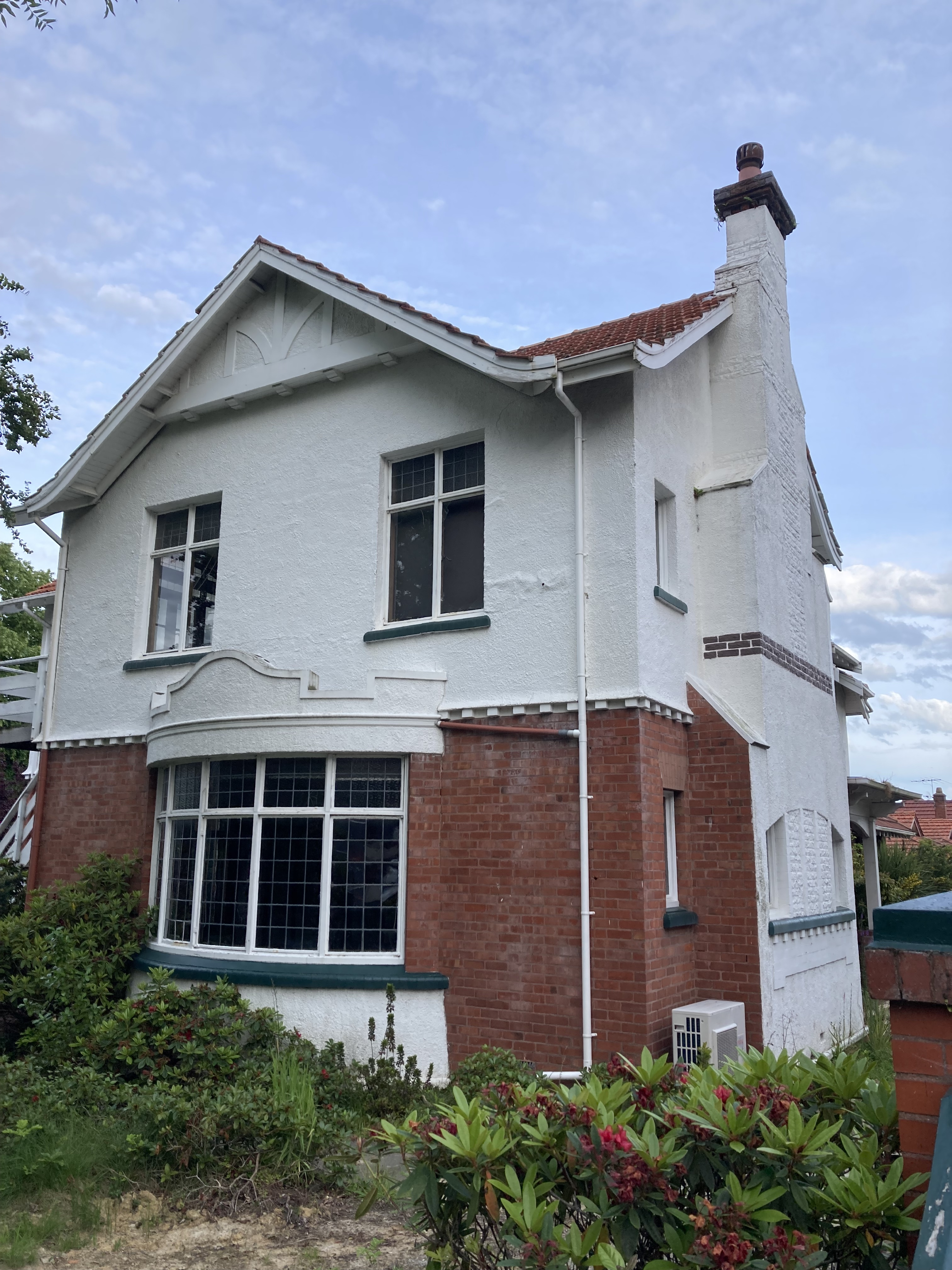
Haynes House, in Dunedin

On their return to Dunedin, the Anscombes enrolled Ruby at High St School (24 July 1907). Described as "an architect now resident in Dunedin, who has had considerable experience in the United States," Anscombe won the University of Otago School of Mines competition in 1907 under the pseudonym: "Esperanto." This winning entry began his productive relationship with the university council which in 1911 conferred on him the position of university architect – a position he retained until 1928 when he left Dunedin for Wellington. This position gave him access to commissions across the university including: extensions to Maxwell Bury's work, Allen Hall (1914), the Domestic Science building (1918), the Physics building (1922), Marama Hall (1923), the Dental school (the Marples Building, now the Department of Zoology, 1924), and the Medical school (1927). Anscombe's early and consistent success in competitions (which included: the School of Mines (1907), Hanover Street Baptist Church, Dunedin (1912), Y.M.C.A. (1910), Central Hall (1910), and Otago Girls' High School (1910 and 1921) – where he won first and second place) coincided with a number of ecclesiastical commissions: St. Clair Presbyterian Church (1909), Oamaru Presbyterian Church (1910), Musselburgh Presbyterian Church (c1910), Mornington Baptist Church (1910/11), North East Valley Presbyterian Church additions (c. 1913), Opoho Presbyterian Church (1913), and residential design work for: Mr Turnbull, for a residence on The Crescent, Roseneath (c.1936), Mr. Ivory (c.1909), Thomas Fogg (c.1910), Rev. James Chisholm (c1910), H. C. Campbell (1911), H. S. Bingham (1913), Thomas Thomson (c.1914). The Haynes House, built for draper Alex Haynes at 284 Stuart Street, in an English domestic Revival style, was a demolished in 2026 by Elim Group.

These early years in Anscombe's practice were also early years in the history of the New Zealand Institute of Architects (N.Z.I.A), which began as a national organisation in 1905. Anscombe was elected a Fellow of the N.Z.I.A. in 1912. He also contributed an article entitled: "The Economic Value of Scientific Town Planning" to an N.Z.I.A. conference. About 1916, Anscombe began experimenting with a concrete block dry wall system. It was at this time he designed "Cintra," his house in Andersons Bay, Dunedin, which was constructed in these "O.K. blocks" which he patented in 1920. Shortly after this Anscombe's mother died at the age of 66 years on 2 July 1921.

Anscombe's practice continued to flourish and commissions from this time included the Maheno and Marama Hospital Ships' Surplus Fund Memorial Hall (1919/1923), the Lindo Ferguson Building (1927), the University of Otago Dental School (1924), Arthur Barnett's Department Store (1924), now part of the Meridian Mall, Dunedin, Messers Herbert, Haynes and Co Ltd building (1925), Logan Park Grandstand (1929) and, of course, the design work for the New Zealand and South Seas International Exhibition (1925–26), including the still surviving art exhibition building (1924), which involved a number of overseas trips specifically to Melbourne to consult with the engineer of the scenic railways in Melbourne.

Anscombe was utterly proactive in finding work and both the New Zealand and South Seas International Exhibition (1925) and the New Zealand Centennial Exhibition (1940) were initiated by him but it seems this proactive approach may have alienated him from some sectors of the architectural profession. The first signs of this appear at the time an architect was to be appointed for the 1925 exhibition and is documented in an exchange of letters between Anscombe and the N.Z.I.A. regarding this subject. The N.Z.I.A. had offered to donate

"a Lay-out Scheme on any Site ... [and] act in an Honorary Advisory capacity in approving and if necessary suggesting improvements to any design."

Later they advocated that the design work be apportioned to individual architects. Anscombe queried the N.Z.I.A. offer of a "donated" plan which, it seems, fast became conditional on the assurance of further work and he described this as "decidedly infra dig and a breach of etiquette on the part of ... the Institute much to be regretted." He made clear his opposition to the dividing of architectural responsibility, arguing that in his opinion it was not in the best interests of the Directors. In a later N.Z.I.A. meeting he was accused of "competing against the Institute for the work" and was asked to "retire from the Meeting." A similar situation occurred later with reference to the 1940 exhibition when Anscombe found himself opposed by the collective group of local architects. In that instance, it was Anscombe's ability to produce work quickly which ensured he got the commission.

In 2024, a house built by Anscombe at 284 Stuart Street, opposite the Mandeno-designed King Edward Technical College, was threatened by demolition, along with a protected lime tree on the site. The developers plan to build thirty residential units on the site. More than 90 submissions were received to the planned proposal, with the majority opposed.

== Travels 1928–1929 ==
In 1928, after leaving Dunedin, Anscombe embarked on a longer world trip accompanied by his two daughters now aged 29 and 17 years. They left for this trip in early March 1928 and travelled to the Middle East (Egypt, Greece, Palestine, and Turkey), Britain (England, and Ireland), and Europe (Austria, Belgium, Czechoslovakia, France, Germany, Italy, Switzerland) concluding the journey in America before returning to New Zealand via Honolulu and Suva. The Dominion reports the group's recent return in April 1929. On this trip, Anscombe seemed particularly interested in architecture, city and street planning, and the use of lighting at night time. While they were abroad Anscombe's father died on 8 August 1928 at Ashburton at the Tuarangi Home for old men.

The trip bridges Anscombe's practice in Dunedin and his practice in Wellington. There are various speculations as to why Anscombe, a well established architect in his mid-fifties, made the move to Wellington at this time. Shaw attributes Anscombe's move to the need "to be ready to design the Centennial of New Zealand Exhibition of 1939–40," while McNeill notes the timing of Anscombe's departure coincides with the publication of The Inside Story which "would have made it difficult for him to remain in Dunedin."

== Architectural practice in Wellington ==
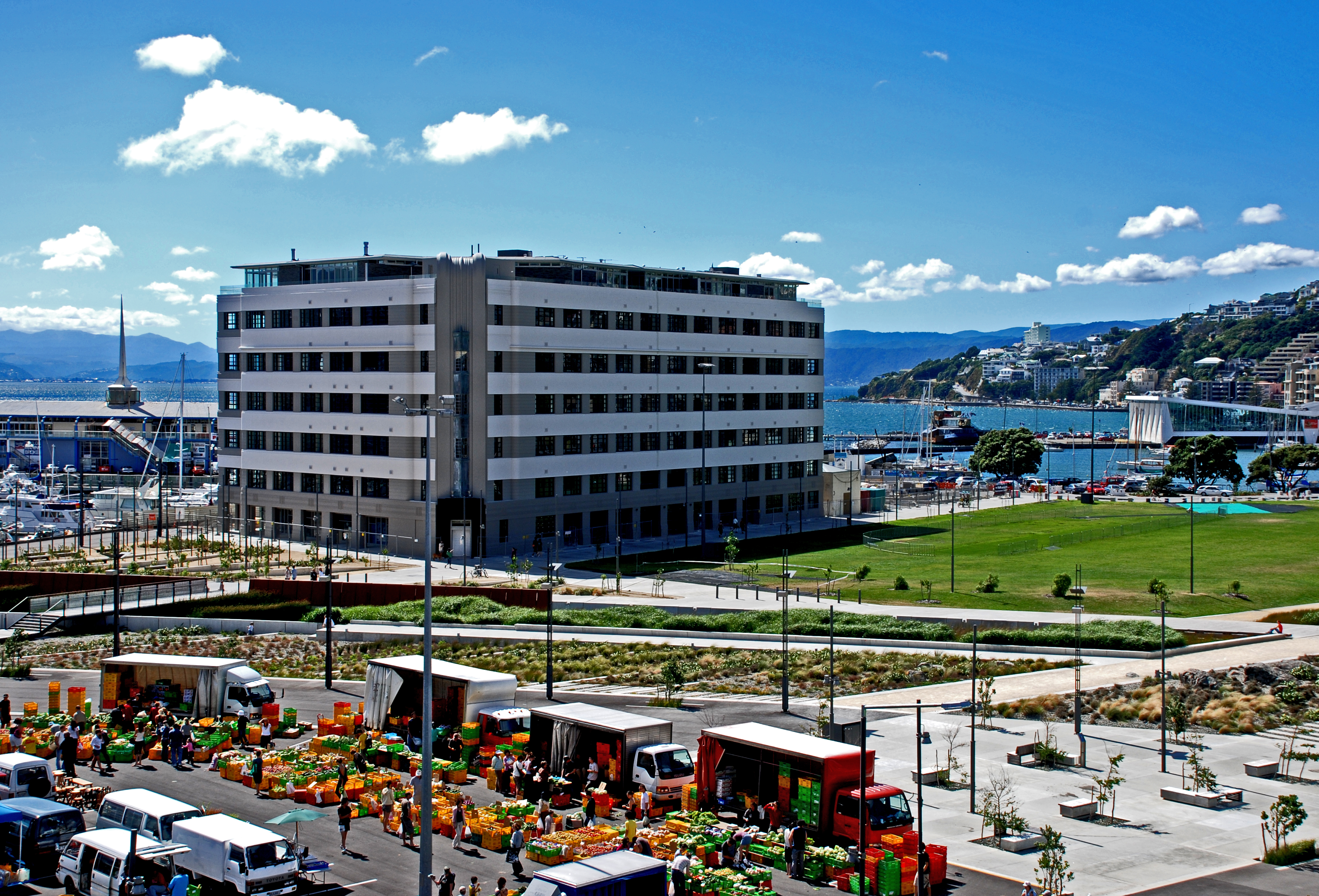
Anscombe's Post and Telegraph Building next to Waitangi Park in Wellington

In Wellington Anscombe set up a practice on The Terrace and he and his daughters lived on Oriental Parade at the back of the section Anscombe was later to build Lyndfield (now Anscombe Flats). They lived there until the apartment block was completed in the late thirties. These apartments, like many projects during the inter-war depression, were built on the "No. 13" scheme where a percentage of the project's cost was met by Government funding. The Anscombe's occupied the penthouse flat at Lyndfield, which, when his daughters married and left home, became a place of regular extended family gatherings. The flat was also where Anscombe trialled drafts of his schemes, letters, and proposals in front of his architect sons-in-law, daughters and grandchildren for discussion and feedback.

Anscombe employed a small office in Wellington which designed a range of work including residential apartments (Lyndfield and Olympus on Oriental Parade, Franconia on The Terrace (1938), Belvedere at the corner Austin and Majoribanks Streets), Hamilton Flats (Hawker Street) and commercial and institutional projects including: the Post and Telegraph Building, Herd St (1939), Dominion Motors, the Island Bay kindergarten, and the Lloyd St, Disabled Soldiers' Vocational Centre (1943). One of his longest serving staff in this Wellington office was Mrs. Ethel Bulté, who was known as "Auntie Pat" by Anscombe's grandchildren. She was Anscombe's secretary and is remembered by the grandchildren as always wearing black, her "grey hair pulled back into a bun" with the appearance of being an "efficient secretary." She remained a friend of the family even after Anscombe died.

== Architectural practice in Hawke's Bay ==
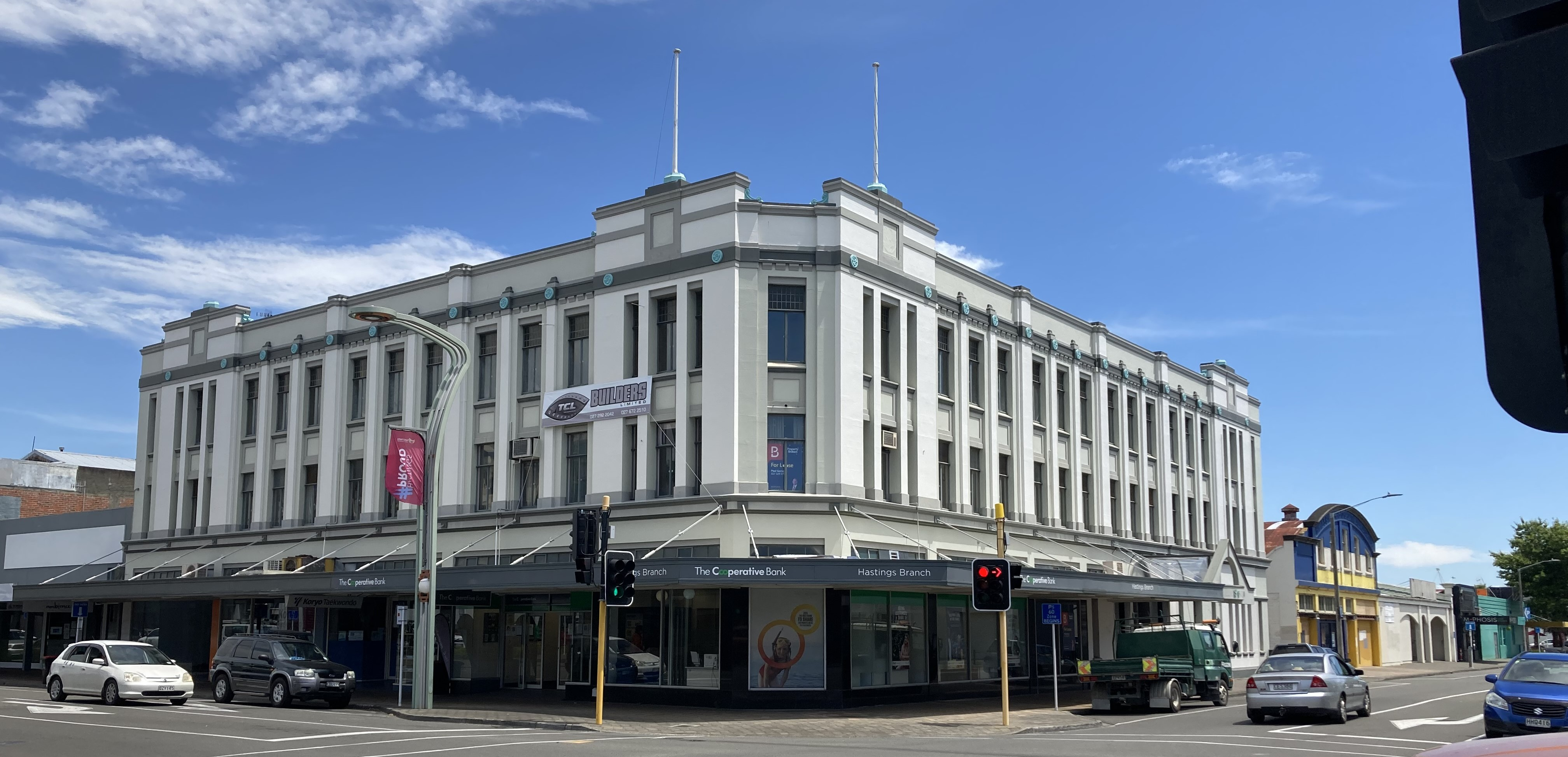
Hawke's Bay Farmer's Cooperative Association Building designed by Anscombe Associates 1929

In 1929 Anscombe was commissioned by the Hawke's Bay Farmer's Cooperative Association to design a new head office following a disastrous fire that destroyed their building in 1928. The building was of a strong Stripped Classical design constructed to withstand earthquakes due to its floating foundations, meaning it would not strain with tension of ground movement. The Hawke's Bay Farmer's Building opened in late 1930 and Anscombe opened a branch of his Wellington Firm in the building with prospects of further work in the developing town.

At the time the 1931 Earthquake struck, Anscombe was taking refreshments in the Hawke's Bay Farmer's Building tearooms. Historian Michael Fowler records that Anscombe had such faith in his own work, that he continued eating, unfazed by the 7.8 magnitude quake. When the quake stopped, most of the Hastings central business district had collapsed or was badly damaged, except for Anscombe's building, and as a result no lives were lost.

Anscombe's Hastings branch were prolific contributors to the design and rebuild of Hastings, with the Hawke's Bay Farmer's Building setting the lead in the styles of Stripped Classicism, Art Deco, and Spanish Mission. A Heritage Inventory Project completed by the Hastings District Council identifies at least 20 surviving buildings designed by Anscombe over the years 1931–1936, predominantly concentrated along the main retail strip of Heretaunga Street Hastings.

Considered one of the most decorative buildings in Hastings is the Westerman's Building, which Anscombe designed for Westerman & Co. in 1932. The building continues to be held in high regard due to its panoply of ornamentation arranged into one design, which was reported in the Hawke's Bay Tribune in October 1932:.

To say that Westerman and Co’s new building is symmetrical in design and beautiful in detail is not to err on the side of exaggeration. It is the fulfilment of the hopes, efforts and anticipation of a lifetime. It provides an added glory to the new city of Hastings.

The building commands a prominent position in the Russell Street Historic Area of Hastings and is iconic for its highly decorative below verandah façade with original Wunderlich pressed metal soffits, terrazzo panelling, bronzed-copper window joinery, bevelled glass and leadlight. A splayed corner links the two street elevations along Russell Street and Heretaunga Street, and has a double doorway leading onto a small balcony with wrought iron ballustrading. The doorway is framed by barley-twist columns and fluted Corinthian pillars with decorative capitals, the 'Westerman's' name plate, and the date '1932.'

Anscombe wrote that ‘The buildings of today should combine simplicity, convenience, strength, beauty, harmony and permanence, and be designed for the definite purpose of supporting … a business … in the performance of its everyday function’

=== Hastings rebuild 1931–1936 ===
Anscombe and Associates Hastings buildings listed in the Hastings CBD Inventory Project:

Date	Building Name	Style	Location	Notes
1929	Hawke's Bay Farmer's Cooperative Association Building	Stripped Classical	Market Street	Pre-earthquake reinforced concrete Heritage NZ Category II Listed No.1088
1931	J Hennah's Buildings	Art Deco	Heretaunga Street 300 West Block	Reconditioning of 1925 Building
1931	Ebbett Building	Art Deco	Queen Street	Reconditioning of 1915 Building Ebbett Building Hastings designed by Edmund Anscombe 1931
1931	Hawke's Bay Meat Co. Building	Stripped Classical Art Deco	Karamū Road	Reconditioning of 1925 Building
1931	Cliff Press Building	Art Deco	Queen Street	
1932	Westerman's & Co.	Art Deco Greek Revival Spanish Mission	Heretaunga Street 100 East Block Russell Street Historic Area	Heritage NZ Listed Category I No.178 Westerman's Building Hastings designed by Edmund Anscombe 1932
1932	Wade's Buildings	Art Deco	Heretaunga Street 300 West Block	
1932	E J T Warren Building	Art Deco	Heretaunga Street 200 East Block	
1932	Simmonds Building	Art Deco Greek Revival	Heretaunga Street 200 East Block	Simmonds Building Hastings designed by Edmund Anscombe 1932
1933	Foster Brook's Building	Art Deco Greek Revival	Heretaunga Street 100 West Block	
1933	Woolworths Building	Art Deco	Heretaunga Street 100 West Block	
1933	Heighway's Building	Art Deco Mayan Revival	Heretaunga Street 100 West Block	
1933	Kershaw's Building	Art Deco	Heretaunga Street 200 East Block	Kershaw's Building Hastings designed by Edmund Anscombe 1933
1934	Harding's Buildings	Art Deco	Heretaunga Street 200 East Block	
1934	State Theatre	Art Deco	Heretaunga Street 100 East Block	Designed with Vernon Brown
1934	Central Building	Art Deco Greek Revival	Heretaunga Street 200 West Block	Heritage NZ Category II Listed No.1073 Central Building Hastings designed by Edmund Anscombe 1934
1934	George Ebbett Building	Art Deco	Heretaunga Street 400 West Block	
1935	E J T Warren Building II	Art Deco	Heretaunga Street 200 East Block	Is a repeating design adjacent to the 1932 E J T Warren Building
1935	Dominion Restaurant	Art Deco Zig-Zag Moderne	Heretaunga Street 200 East Block	Dominion Restaurant Hastings designed by Edmund Anscombe 1935
1935	Duncan Building	Art Deco	Queen Street	
1935	Garage Building	Art Deco	Nelson Street	
1936	P J S George Building	Art Deco Greek Revival	Heretaunga Street 200 East Block	
1936	McIvor Building	Art Deco	Heretaunga Street 200 West Block	McIvor Building Hastings designed by Edmund Anscombe 1936
1936	Newbigin Building	Art Deco Mayan Revival	Market Street	Newbigin Building Hastings designed by Edmund Anscombe 1936

== American travels and influences ==
Once established in Wellington, and after the extension of his office into the Hawke's Bay following the 1931 earthquake, Anscombe travelled to the United States again visiting the Chicago World's Fair for three weeks in July 1933. On this same trip he visited Long Beach, California where he was ""very impressed with the beautiful waterfront feature enclosing an area of 32 acres (130,000 m^{2}) of still water."" This influenced his 1945 proposal for a bandshell and amenities on a 20-foot (6.1 m) wide promenade wall to enclose 10 acres (40,000 m^{2}) of still water with an illuminated fountain at Oriental Bay, published in The Evening Post in February 1945. Such schemes were sometimes extensions of building projects as in the case of the Post and Telegraph Building in Herd St which shaped a proposed gardens in Chaffers Park part of a plan, which was realised, to extend Cable St as "a new approach to Oriental Bay." Anscombe also contributed to the discussion of the shaping of the Civic Centre, publishing a scheme in The Dominion in June 1934.

In early May 1940, Anscombe anticipated travel to America and wrote to the Minister of Supply, Dan Sullivan, that he was

"anxious to visit the United States shortly – primarily to visit both the San Francisco and New York Worlds Fairs – but while there I intend to check up on the latest development in Combined Factories, Housing, City Planning Schemes generally, Air Port Schemes, Bus Termini Stations etc." (unpublished letter to D.G. Sullivan, Minister of Supply, May 1940)

He offered to report on these to the Minister on his return. Sullivan replied asking Anscombe to "particularly look at the latest developments in that country with a view to translating them into a concrete proposal for this country." On this trip Anscombe visited: the Douglas aircraft works, Santa Monica, the Curtis Wright Corporation, St Louis, the Lockheed factory, the Consolidated Aircraft Corporation, San Diego, and the Packard Company. He furnished a report to Sullivan dated 16 January 1941 in which he outlined the American context which supported the building of combined factories and referred Sullivan to his 1919 brochure: Modern Industrial Development. Two years later he published such a scheme for Aotea wharf in Wellington.

== Town planning ==
The 1925 and 1940 exhibitions also provided Anscombe with opportunities to suggest urban redevelopment schemes which would impact on each host city long after the period of the exhibition. In an article from June 1924, Anscombe outlined a proposal for a highway reserve, a park system, city zoning and housing, influenced by "the park and parkway system of Kansas City" and in keeping with Anscombe's "municipal housekeeping on scientific lines" outlined in his 1915 paper: "The Economic Value of Scientific Town Planning." The proposal was not implemented exactly as Anscombe suggested yet much of his intention has persisted, including the tree-lined Anzac Avenue and Logan Park, in Dunedin. This desire to ensure that temporary projects also served longer-term strategies is also seen in the anticipation that, like the San Francisco Treasure Island Fair, the 1940 New Zealand Centennial Exhibition buildings should be reconverted for use as airport buildings and that exhibition art galleries should be permanent. He also proposed an urban scheme for Wellington with a similar interest in long-term "betterments." Here he argued for an exhibition site close to central Wellington, in preference to Rongotai, maintaining that the central location was important and provided an opportunity "to carry out a much-needed improvement work" in the Adelaide road area. This central location was to take advantage of such already existing facilities as Government House, the Public Hospital, Wellington Boys' College, and the Museum and Art Gallery.

== Architectural writing ==
In addition to his architectural work Anscombe was an avid writer. During his lifetime he published a number of books and pamphlets and regularly published articles in local newspapers (both in Dunedin and in Wellington) writing on subjects ranging from urban planning and new building materials to the recollections of his travels. Anscombe's next travel overseas was an extensive tour of Canada and the United States where he visited "over fifty Canadian and American cities" in 1922. On this trip he learnt about building methods and town planning and continued his "keen interest in the construction of museums and art galleries ... making a special study of these buildings." The year following his return, his wife Douglas died aged 49, on 11 September 1923.

== Final years ==
Anscombe died on 9 October 1948, working up until his death. His funeral was held two days later at St John's Presbyterian church, Willis St on 11 October 1948. He was cremated at Karori and is buried in Andersons Bay Cemetery in Dunedin. His will was filed on 20 October, his estate valued at £20,757 17 shillings and 8 pence. In addition to relatives, St John's Presbyterian Church and the Crippled Children Society Wellington Branch were beneficiaries. An obituary in October 1948 in the Dominion, noted of the funeral that:

"The New Zealand Institute of Architects was represented and nearly every member of the Wellington branch attended. Most of the leading building firms of the city were also generously represented."

== See also ==
- Category:Edmund Anscombe buildings
