= Sargood Centre =

Heritage building in Dunedin, New Zealand

- Sargood Centre in 2007, seen from the south
- Interactive map of the Sargood Centre area
- Alternative names: Exhibition Art Gallery (former)

General information
- Location: Dunedin North, 40 Logan Park Drive, Dunedin
- Coordinates: 45°51′53″S 170°31′33″E
- Client: 1925 New Zealand and South Seas International Exhibition

Design and construction
- Architect: Edmund Anscombe

Renovating team
- Architect: Jackie Gillies

Heritage New Zealand – Category 1
- Designated: 7 July 1982
- Reference no.: 2149

The Sargood Centre is the common name for the former Exhibition Art Gallery, located at 40 Logan Park Drive in Dunedin, Otago. It is registered as a Category I heritage building by Heritage New Zealand. The building was designed by Edmund Anscombe as the art gallery for the 1925 New Zealand and South Seas International Exhibition. The building is considered of "outstanding historical significance" as it is the only exhibition building from any of New Zealand's exhibitions that is still intact and in situ, and one of only eight worldwide.

Construction began in 1924 and was completed in 1925. The building is of brick and concrete construction.

After the international exhibition, the gallery was purchased for the Dunedin Public Art Gallery, thanks to a significant donation from Percy and Lucy Sargood, in memory of their son Cedric. Since 1997 it has housed sports organisations and a function room.

== History ==
The gallery is situated in Logan Park, close to the University Oval and Logan Park Grandstand, designed by Anscombe in 1929. The building was originally part of seven pavilions designed by Anscombe for the 1925 New Zealand and South Seas International Exhibition. The other exhibition buildings were made of temporary materials, however lending requirements of the art owners for the exhibition meant the gallery space was constructed differently.

A wing was added in 1951, funded by Lucy Sargood and named the Sargood Wing. Further additions included a two-storey addition in 1968, which included a storage block and a conservation space, followed by an art education block in the 1970s. In 2000, two gallery spaces were demolished.

Complete demolition was later proposed to extend the cricket ground to international standards. This was avoided and the subsequent refurbishment plans, by conservation architect Jackie Gillies, involved removal of partitions, recreation of the original portico, and strengthening of the main gallery. A representative of the Sargood family hailed the plans as a "fantastic compromise".

== Construction and layout ==
The gallery is of brick and concrete construction, and was single storey. The other exhibition buildings were made of temporary materials, however lending requirements of the art owners for the exhibition meant the gallery was built differently.

The gallery was lit through skylights with reflective baffles, which directed light onto the walls below and left the central spaces comparatively dark. Samuel Hurst Seager, at that time President of the New Zealand Institute of Architects and a specialist on gallery lighting, called the space "one of the best lighted galleries I have seen anywhere, and I have traveled all over the British Isles and the Continent for the special purpose of studying the lighting effect in their galleries." He also admired the lay out: "the very excellent arrangement of the building into eleven small galleries, designed not only to give visitors easy access from room to room, but also to permit certain works to be placed in positions that enabled one to get those long, distant views so desirable for some pictures."

== Usage ==
After the international exhibition, the gallery was purchased by the Dunedin Art Gallery Society and the Dunedin City Council for the display of the city art collection. The purchase was made possible thanks to a significant donation from Percy and Lucy Sargood, in memory of their son Cedric. The art collection has previously been housed on Cumberland Street but the premises were too small, noisy and dirty, and the roof leaked.

The city art collection was moved to the Dunedin Public Art Gallery on Moray Place in 1997. Since 2005 the Academy of Sport and Otago Rugby have been tenants in the building.
