= Hulbert House =

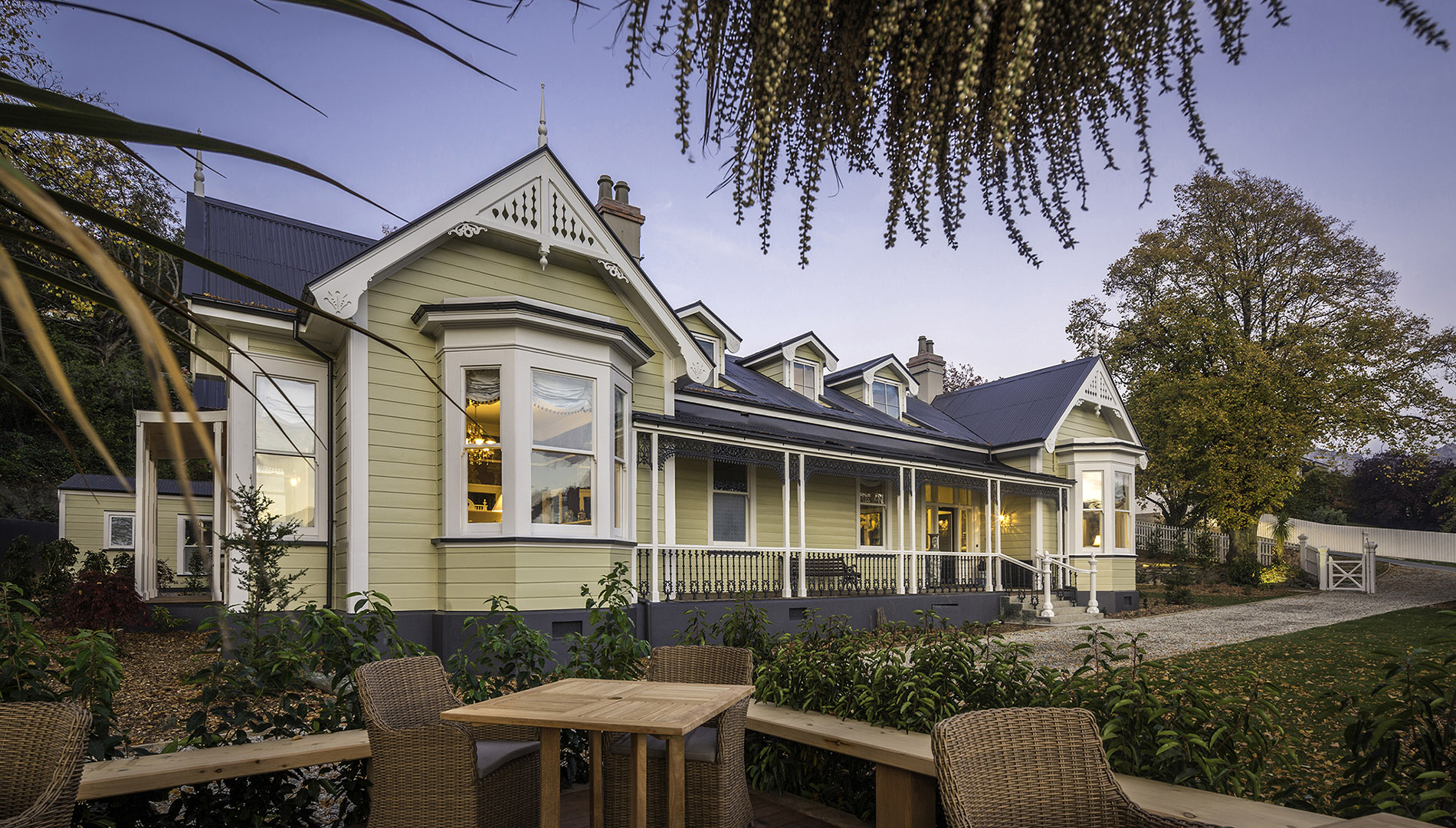
- Interactive map of the Hulbert House area

General information
- Type: Hotel, tourism
- Architectural style: Victorian
- Location: 68 Ballarat Street, Queenstown, New Zealand
- Coordinates: 45°1′47.4″S 168°39′50.8″E
- Completed: 1871
- Renovated: 2016

Design and construction
- Architect: Mason & Wales

Other information
- Number of rooms: 6

Heritage New Zealand – Category 2
- Designated: 24 November 1983
- Reference no.: 2343

Hulbert House is a 19th-century Victorian villa on Ballarat St. in Queenstown, New Zealand, overlooking Lake Wakatipu. The house has six suites, each named after notable individuals.

The renovated interior of the Hulbert House was designed by Neil McLachlan and Soichiro Fukutake. Hulbert House is a category 2 heritage building.

== History and architecture ==
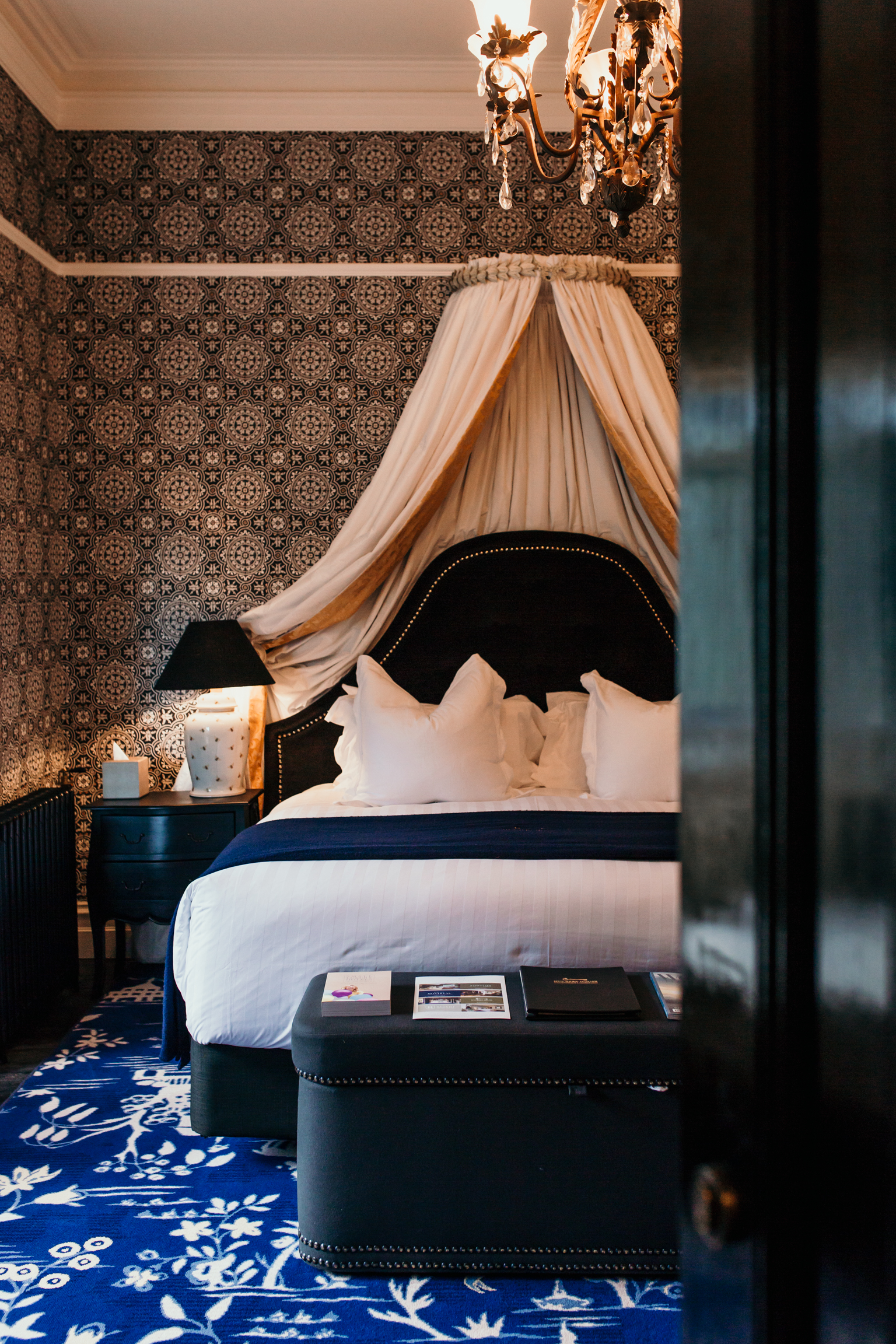
Victorian interior of Hulbert House

The villa with today's form was first established in 1887–88, with its first owner being Horatio Nelson Firth, a gold trader. The Firth suite is named after Horatio Nelson Firth. It has served various purposes, including serving as a maternity home and nursing home.

In 1871, the site was first settled as a land, initially granted to Michael John Malaghan, the owner of the Prince of Wales Hotel. However, the site's legal ownership documentation was not confirmed in a certificate of title until 1876.

Due to its steep location, the site's construction, at first, presented a challenge as it was away from the town. Based on historical documentation, in 1874, a small timber cottage having a mono-pitched roof was constructed on the site, which was later followed by two sheds being built towards the north. The mono-pitched top on such a large structure made it appear novel in its respective period. Subsequently, a wooden verandah was constructed at the cottage's front side, whereas the historic stone house was also constructed at the rear side. By the end of 1874, a wooden expansion with a double pitched roof was built on the south side of the cottage.

In 1876, the land was formally granted to Philip Burbage Boult.

By 1880, a stone extension was added to the wooden expansion at the cottage's eastern end. The stone foundations of this extension were located beneath the scullery floor in the villa, and a plaster scar on the rear interior of the service range showed the original pitch of the roof. Furthermore, a service building – a stable, was constructed upslope above the building.

A timber shack with a stone foundation was also built at the Ballarat/Hallenstein Street corner at the backside, with an extension being added to it towards the northern side by 1886.

In 1886, the land was sold to Horatio Nelson Firth, who gradually started demolishing the buildings and dismantling the chimneys during 1886– 1888.

The site was then completely vacated except for the stone service range at the rear before the villa's construction began in 1888/1889, with its first owner being Horatio Nelson Firth. The construction of the timber villa and renovation of the stone service range at the rear side was started.

The timber shack at the backside having a stone foundation was removed, and a single wooden building was built before the year 1901.

The site’s first three owners were renowned in Queenstown; however, two were found guilty and, consequently, imprisoned. From 1889 to 1901, The house was the Firth family home. In 1901, Firth was sent to prison for embezzlement. From 1901 to 1909, Firth’s wife ran the building as a boarding house.

In 1901, William Royston Ambler owned the house, followed by Patrick McCarthy and his family.

In 1924, the villa was owned by Elizabeth McFarlane, operating as a private nursing home. In 1937, it was purchased by Mary Salmond as a holiday home/letting rooms with kitchen facilities, and in 1942, leased by Archerfield Girls’ School of Dunedin as a refuge for girls whose lives were at risk due to the war. In 1945, the Southland Hospital Board purchased it as a maternity home, and in 1948, it was sold by Mary Salmond to Hazel Grant as a guest house.

In 1964, the Salvation Army took over the house, which was later purchased by Harry Ashurst in 1968, Alex Arnott in 1971, and then by a group called O’Connells Hotel (later the Vacation Hotel Group), who used it as a staff hostel.

In 1981, it was purchased by Edward Sturt as a family home and bed and breakfast. The house was restored and refurbished, with the name being changed to Hulbert House.

In 2009, Hulbert House was used as a backpacker’s hotel.

In 2013, Japanese Heritage patron investor Soichiro Fukutake bought Hulbert House, employing Neil McLachlan as their project manager for its restoration, and Jackie Gillies as an architect. Soichiro Fututake is no stranger to restoration, having two historic buildings in central Queenstown in completion before purchasing Hulbert House. Once the renovation was completed, Hulbert House re-opened in 2016 as a six suite boutique lodge.

In 2016, the restoration finished and it reopened as a luxury boutique hotel

== See also ==
- List of historic hotels in Otago
