= 1935 New Year Honours (New Zealand) =

Annual awards for New Zealanders

The 1935 New Year Honours in New Zealand were appointments by King George V to various orders and honours to reward and highlight good works by New Zealanders. The awards celebrated the passing of 1934 and the beginning of 1935, and were announced on 1 January 1935.

The recipients of honours are displayed here as they were styled before their new honour.

== Knight Bachelor ==
- Clutha Nantes Mackenzie – director of the Institute for the Blind, Auckland.
- Percy Rolfe Sargood – of Dunedin. For public services.
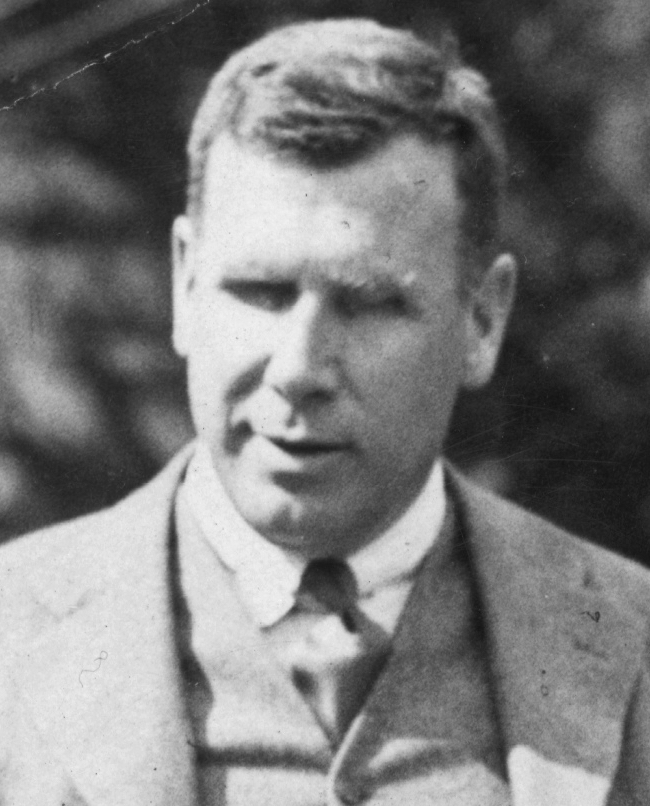
Sir Clutha Mackenzie

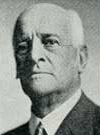
Sir Percy Sargood

== Order of Saint Michael and Saint George ==
=== Companion (CMG) ===
- George Arthur Lewin – town clerk of the City of Dunedin.
- Herbert Harry Sterling – chairman, Government Railway Board.
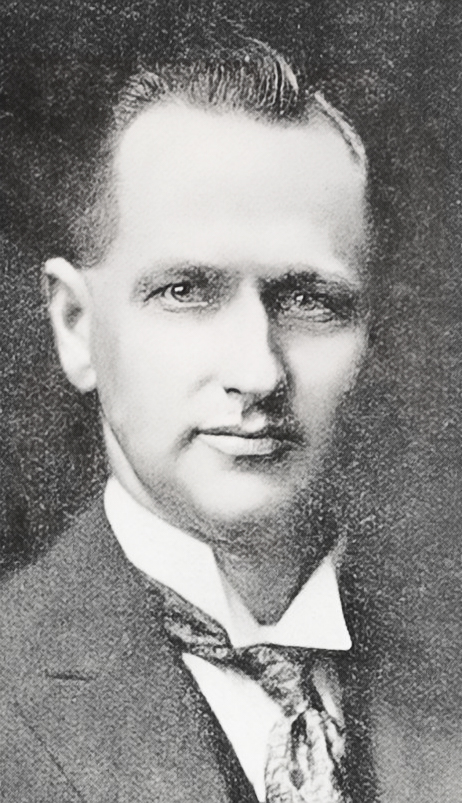
Herbert Sterling

== Order of the British Empire ==
=== Officer (OBE) ===
Military division

- Paymaster Commander Richard Francis Durman RN – naval secretary of the New Zealand Naval Board.
