= Otago Farmers Market =

Weekly market in Dunedin, New Zealand

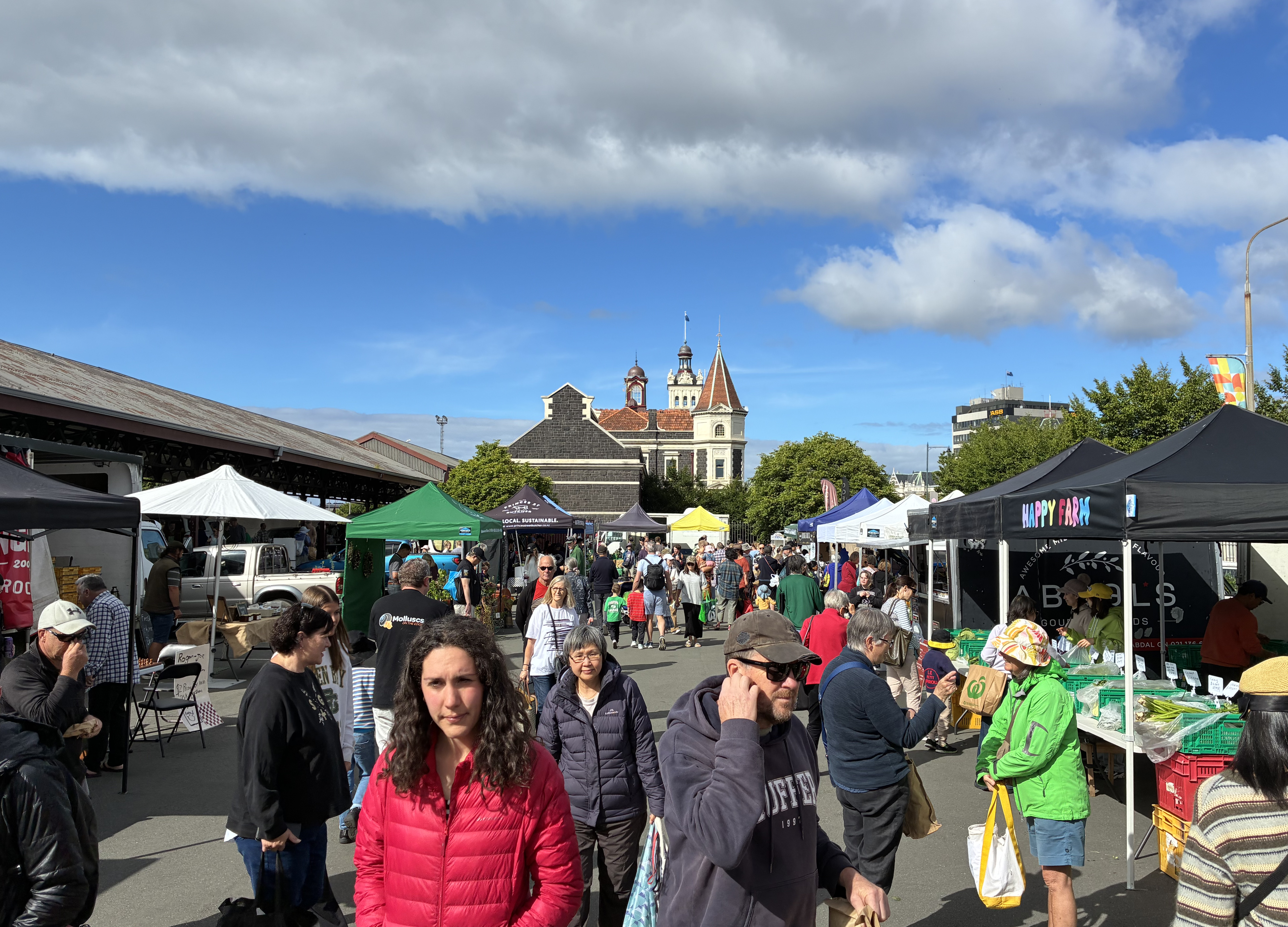
- Stalls in the carpark area of the railway station
- Begins: 8 am to 12.30 pm Saturdays
- Frequency: Weekly
- Venue: Dunedin railway station, northern carpark
- Location: Dunedin
- Country: New Zealand
- Inaugurated: March 2003
- Organiser: Otago Farmers Market Trust
- Website: https://otagofarmersmarket.org.nz/

Otago Farmers Market is a weekly, year-round farmers' market held at the Dunedin railway station in Dunedin, New Zealand. Produce available at the market includes local cheese, eggs, meat and fish, alcohol, flowers, fruit and vegetables and baked goods. The market is a tourist attraction as well as a shopping experience. It has won a number of awards, and led to several cookbooks.

== History ==
The market was established in 2003, using seed funding from Dunedin City Council and Otago Community Trust. It is run by a trust, the Otago Farmers Market Trust, and is part of the Farmers Market New Zealand network. The market operates in the northern carpark of the Dunedin railway station, running on Saturday mornings throughout the year, except for an annual Christmas market which may be a different day of the week. The market began with 23 producers, and by 2008 had reached its current size, around 70 stallholders, selling goods including fruit, vegetables, meat products, eggs, baked goods, flowers and cheese. Seventy per cent of the stalls are primary producers, with the remaining 30% split evenly between added-value goods (for example cheese, jams, sauces), and ready-to-eat food. In 2017, the market manager estimated approximately 5,000 to 8,000 people visit each week. In summertime the market is popular with cruise ship visitors, and is a popular busking venue. Famous visitors to the market include Pink, who donated $20 to a busker, and Nadia Reid, who used to busk at the market.

In 2017 local peanut butter brand Bay Rd Peanut Butter was launched at market. In 2020 former employees of Cadbury's, whose carpark is used for parking during the market, decided to raise funds for mental health from "gold coin" ($1 and $2 coin) donations at the carpark, raising over $100,000 for charities Gumboot Friday and Life Matters by 2025.

In 2022 the market trust expressed concern over decreasing numbers of growers, and the need for succession planning, launching an initiative called 'Grow the growers'. The trust has developed a co-operative vendor model to allow smaller vendors to sell at the market even if they don't produce enough individually for a stall. In 2023 the market celebrated its 20 year anniversary by holding a "long lunch", with around eighty people seated at a single table spread down the railway station platform.

== Impact ==
In 2005 the Otago Farmers Market Trust received an award in the Heritage and Environment section of the Trustpower Dunedin Community Awards. The market has won the People's Choice award at the Outstanding NZ Food Awards in 2017, 2019, 2020, 2023, and 2025. In 2007 a cookbook featuring recipes contributed by stallholders was published, Homegrown: the Star's Otago Farmers Market cookbook (2007), and local chef Alison Lambert produced seasonal recipe books featuring produce from the market in 2010.

The market has been the subject of several research studies, including studies on the willingness of people to buy local food, the backgrounds of shoppers, and the culture and politics of "alternative food networks". A book chapter on local food production and consumption patterns used the Otago Farmers Market as a case study.
