= Jackie Gillies (architect) =

New Zealand architect

- Born: England
- Education: University of Liverpool; University of York
- Occupation: Architect
- Awards: NZIA Local Branch Heritage Award 2009
- Practice: Jackie Gillies + Associates
- Buildings: Williams Cottage, Arrowtown Masonic Lodge, Speight's Brewery

Jackie Gillies is an English and New Zealand architect based in Queenstown. She specialises in architectural conservation and repair of historic buildings.

== Biography ==
Gillies was born in England. She trained in architecture at the University of Liverpool, completing her studies in 1980. Gillies wanted to apply for a specialist course in architectural conservation at the University of York but was told by a tutor that her grades were not good enough. Instead she moved to New Zealand and established her own practice in Queenstown. Twenty-three years after graduating from Liverpool, Gillies did return to York to study conservation of historic buildings, despite by then having her own practice and two small children.

Jackie Gillies + Associates was established in 2010, with a main office in Queenstown and a smaller office in Dunedin. The practice specialised in repair and conservation of historic buildings, architectural design and adaptive reuse, and archaeology. Gillies' projects include Queenstown's oldest house, Williams Cottage, Arrowtown Masonic Lodge, Balfour Stables in Otago, and the renovations at Speight's Brewery in Dunedin. She also worked on the schist and mud building known as Mrs. Heron's cottage in Queenstown, and early concrete buildings including the Francis Petre-designed houses 'Woodside' and Cargill's Castle. Her plans for the refurbishment of the Sargood Centre in Logan Park were hailed as a "fantastic compromise".

Gillies sold the practice to an employee and retired in 2017. Pamela Dziwulska, chair of New Zealand's national committee of the International Council of Monuments and Sites (ICOMOS), was an employee at Jackie Gillies + Associates, and described Gillies as "the first architect that I felt [shared] a mutual understanding of how I view architecture."

== Awards ==
Gillies' work on the Balfour Stables in Otago won the NZIA Local Branch Heritage Award in 2009.

== Photo gallery ==
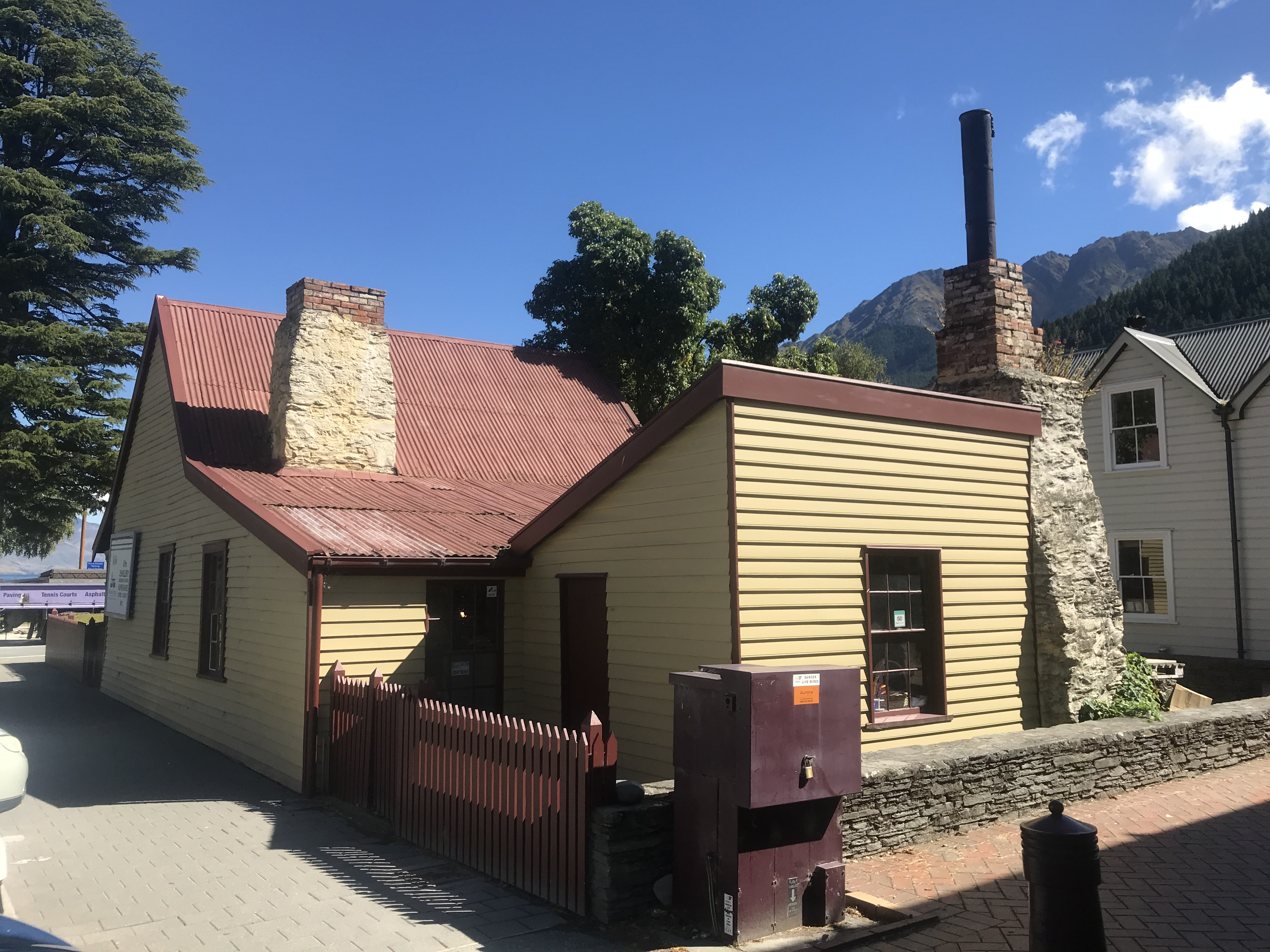
Williams Cottage, the oldest house in Queenstown, in 2021

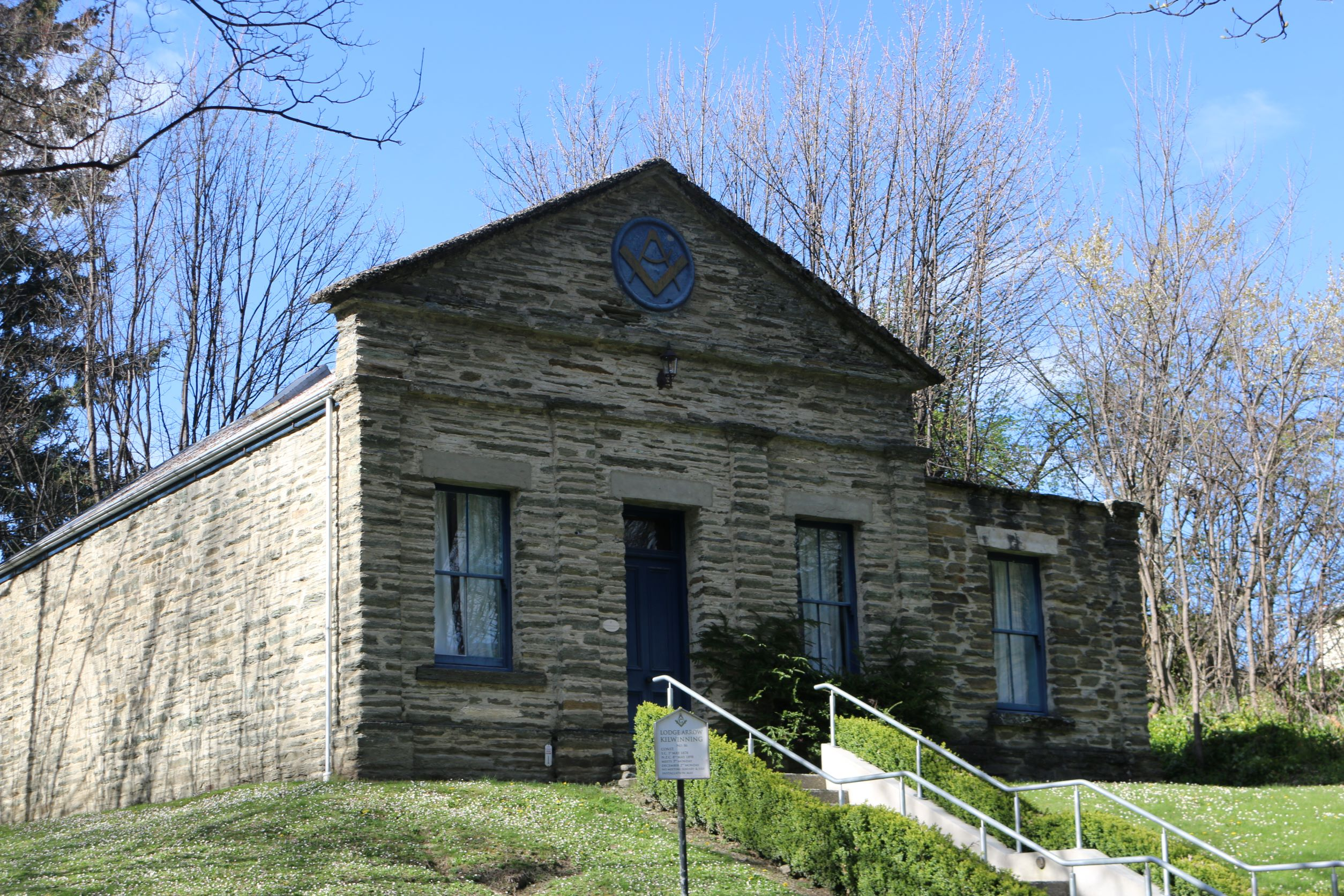
Arrowtown Masonic Lodge in 2021

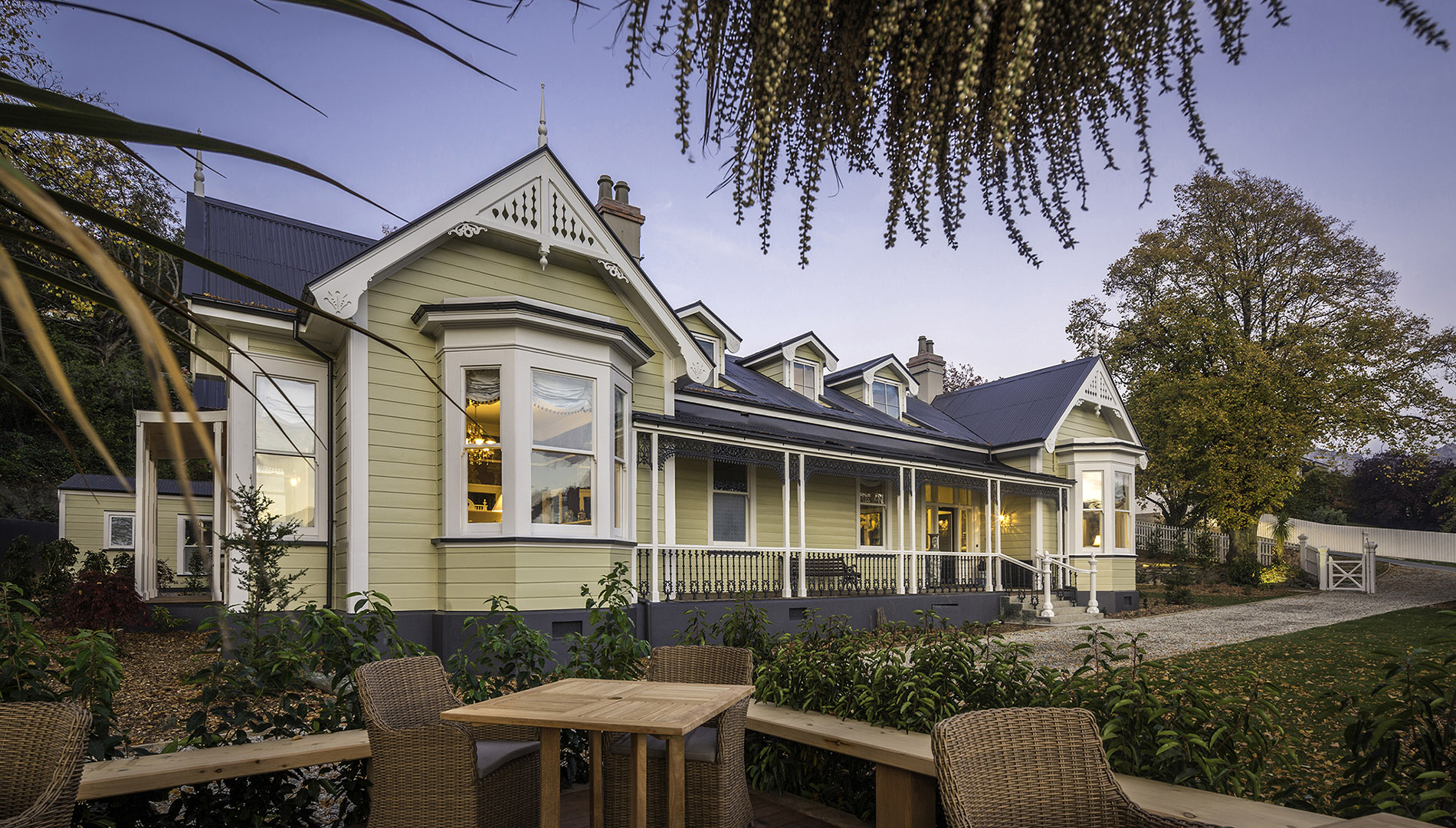
Hulbert House in Queenstown
