= Dunedin railway station =

Railway station in New Zealand

Coordinates: 45°52′31″S 170°30′32″E

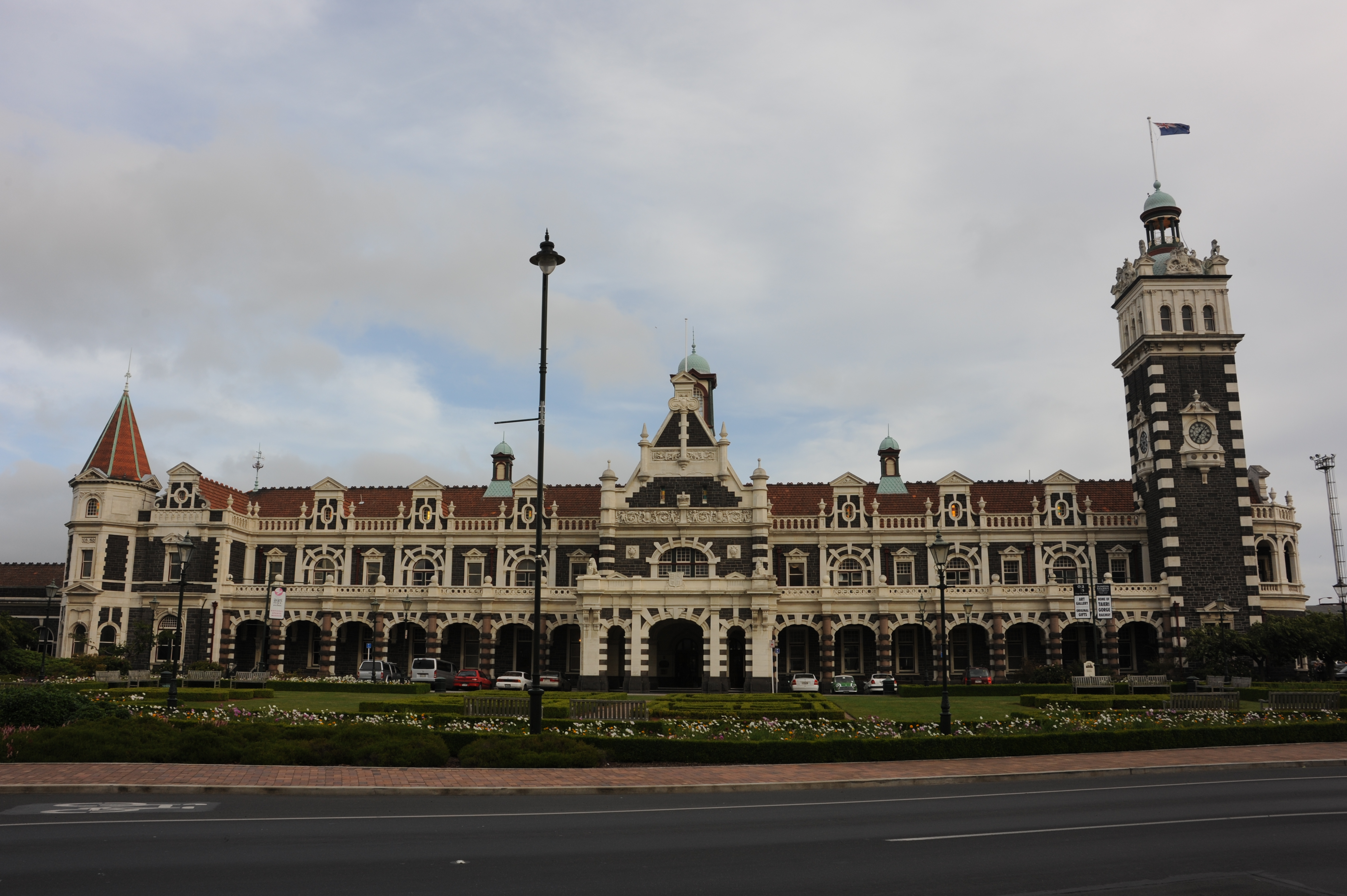
- Anzac Square and Dunedin railway station

General information
- Location: Anzac Square, Dunedin, New Zealand
- Owner: Dunedin City Council
- Line: Main South Line
- Platforms: 2
- Connections: Dunedin Railways

Construction
- Parking: Yes
- Architect: George Troup
- Architectural style: Flemish Renaissance

Other information
- Classification: RHTNZ Category A

History
- Opened: 12 November 1906

Services
Preceding station	Mainland Rail	Following station
Oamaru towards Christchurch	Mainlander	Invercargill Terminus

Heritage New Zealand – Category 1
- Designated: 1 September 1983
- Reference no.: 59
Location

Dunedin railway station is a prominent landmark and tourist site in Dunedin, a city in the South Island of New Zealand. It is speculated by locals to be the most photographed building in the country, as well as the second most photographed in the southern hemisphere, after the Sydney Opera House.

Dunedin Railways Station currently operates several tourist trains out of the station, The Taieri Gorge, The Seasider, and event trains. There are no dedicated intercity or suburban services still operating, although in the past it was the country's busiest station, being served by up to 100 trains a day.

It is designed by George Troup, in the Flemish Renaissance style, and it is his most famous design. It earned Troup the nickname of "Gingerbread George".

== Early rail in Dunedin ==
Dunedin was linked by rail to Port Chalmers in 1872, Christchurch in 1878, with a link south to Invercargill completed the following year, and the first railway workshops were opened at Hillside in South Dunedin in 1875. Early plans were for a grand main station on Cumberland Street, but these did not get further than the laying of a foundation, and a simple temporary weatherboard station was built next to the site in 1884. It took close to 20 years for government funding to be allocated, and planning only really commenced as the 19th century was drawing to a close.

=== 1st station 1872 ===
The station in use since Sunday 21 October 1906 is Dunedin's 4th station, the previous 3 having been to the west. Consideration was given to separate stations for the Port Chalmers branch and Southern Trunk Railway, but in the Second Reading of the Otago Trunk Railway Bill, on 17 September 1867, it was decided the station would be on part of what is now Queens Gardens. When Samuel Packham and about 25 men began work on the line to Port Chalmers on Monday 29 August 1870, he celebrated by breaking a bottle of wine over the first barrow. In October 1870 the gauge was changed from standard gauge to 3ft 6in, as required by the Railways Act 1870. In the opposite direction, James Macandrew turned the First Sod of the Southern Trunk Railway on Saturday 18 March 1871 at the Oval, near Grosvenor Road. Tenders were invited on Monday 29 July 1872 for labour only to build the station and goods shed. It seems the design was by D. L. Simpson, engineer to the Port Chalmers Railway Co. In October 1872 a 200 ft (61 m) x 40 ft (12 m) import goods shed was built. The first train to reach the new station was after 29 October 1872. Macandrew Street, now Burlington Street, was built to access the station from Moray Place. The first known excursion was to an Oddfellows Lodge fete on 26 December 1872. The Grand Opening of the Dunedin & Port Chalmers Railway was on Tuesday 31 December 1872. The railway was sold to Otago Provincial Council on 9 April 1873 for £187,106.

=== 2nd station 1875 ===
In December 1873 Proctor & Whittaker tendered £6,609 to reclaim the site of the next Dunedin station, bounded by Castle, High, and Rattray Streets. In summer 1874/75 a 300 ft (91 m) x 60 ft (18 m) export goods shed was built opposite the new station. On 25 June 1874 Meikle & Campbell tendered £3,368 10s to build the 2nd station in timber on brick foundations, with an iron roof, on the same railway reserve as the first, but with the main entrance off Rattray Street instead of High Street, parallel with the carriage shed, and almost opposite Vogel Street. It opened on Tuesday 6 February 1875. The grand opening of the Dunedin & Clutha Railway was on 1 September 1875.

=== 3rd station 1884 ===
More land was reclaimed to the north of Rattray Street, and the 3rd station was put on the harbour side of Cumberland Street. On 10 March 1884 a contract for its foundations was let to W. Carlton for £1,256 14s and completed by 23 May 1884, with the 3rd station in use from 1 November 1884. The 2nd station was moved in 2 sections to the arrival-platform, late in 1884. By December 1884 the 3rd station had a covered carriage porch, booking office, waiting room, ladies' waiting room, refreshment room, baggage office, 206 ft (63 m) verandah, 400 ft (120 m) x 18 ft (5.5 m) platform, access for carts, store room, lamp room, footbridge and turntable. The engine shed was moved south of Jetty Street and in June 1885 another goods shed was built. In March 1900 the south end of the west (Cumberland Street) platform was extended 3 ch (60 m) south, for longer trains. In 1906 most of the 3rd station was demolished to make way for new tracks and a 2-storey building for staff accommodation, later part of the District Engineer's offices. The old sheds, which had been moved from The Triangle in 1884 were demolished in 1910 for duplication of the line to Mosgiel and elevation of the double track over 2 level crossings to ease the grade to Caversham tunnel.

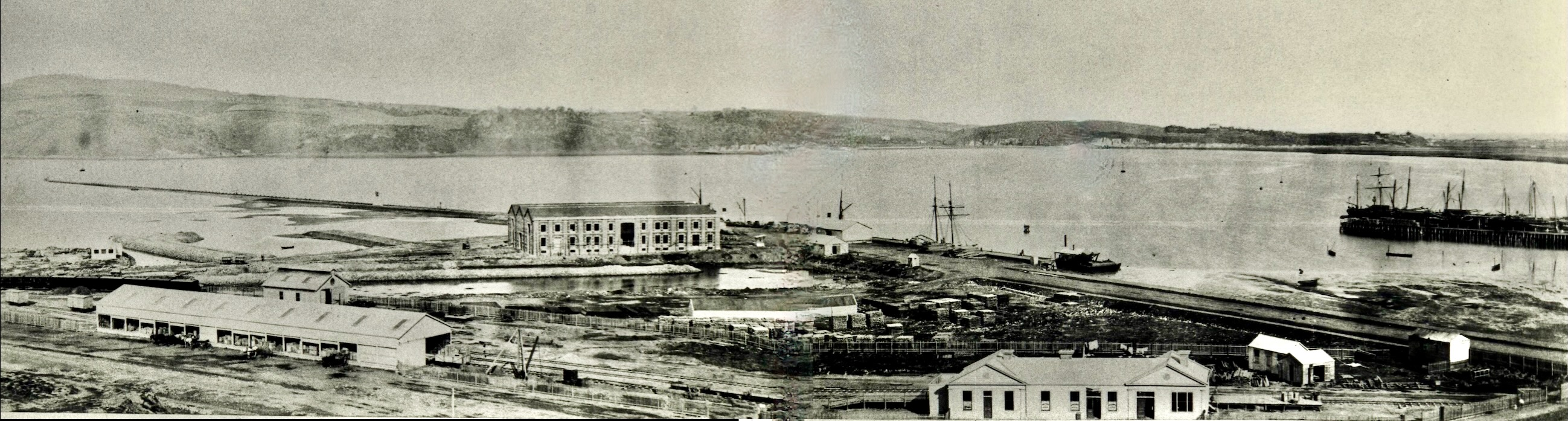
1st station (foreground) and import goods shed (left) in 1873/74

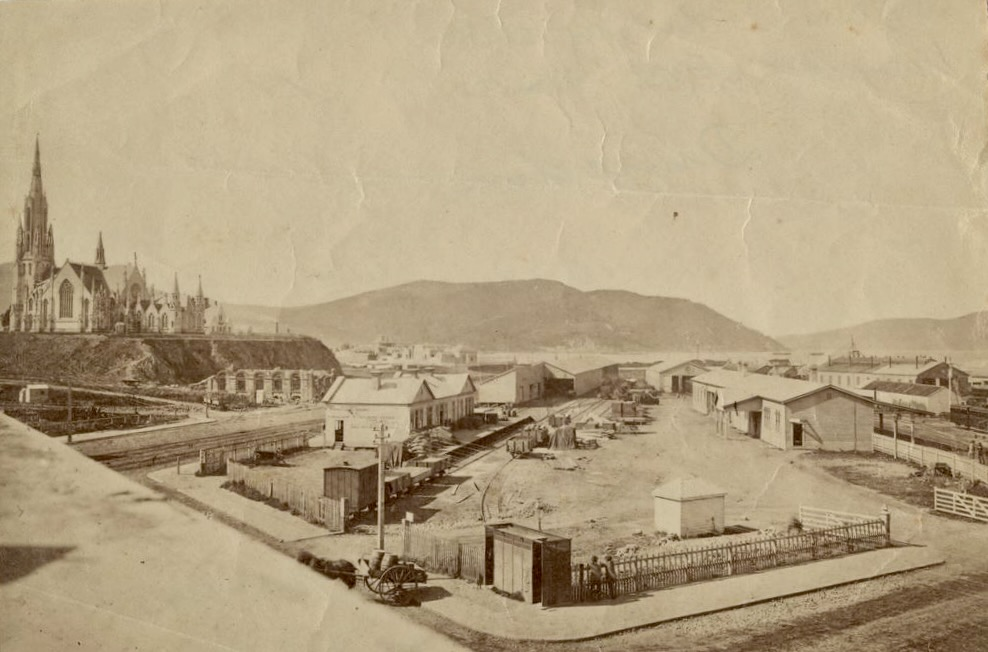
1st (left) and 2nd (rt.) stations c. 1875

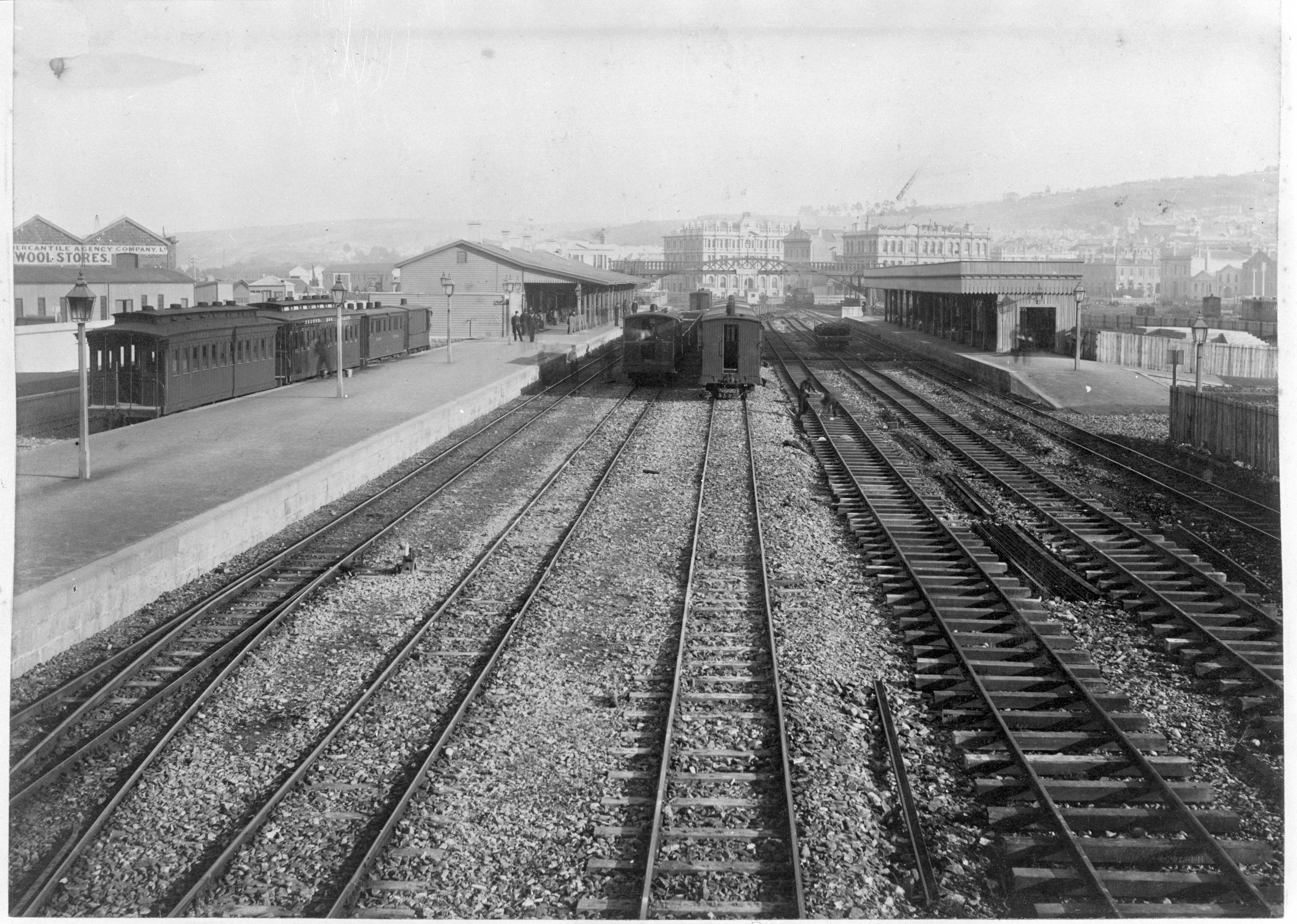
3rd station in 1896

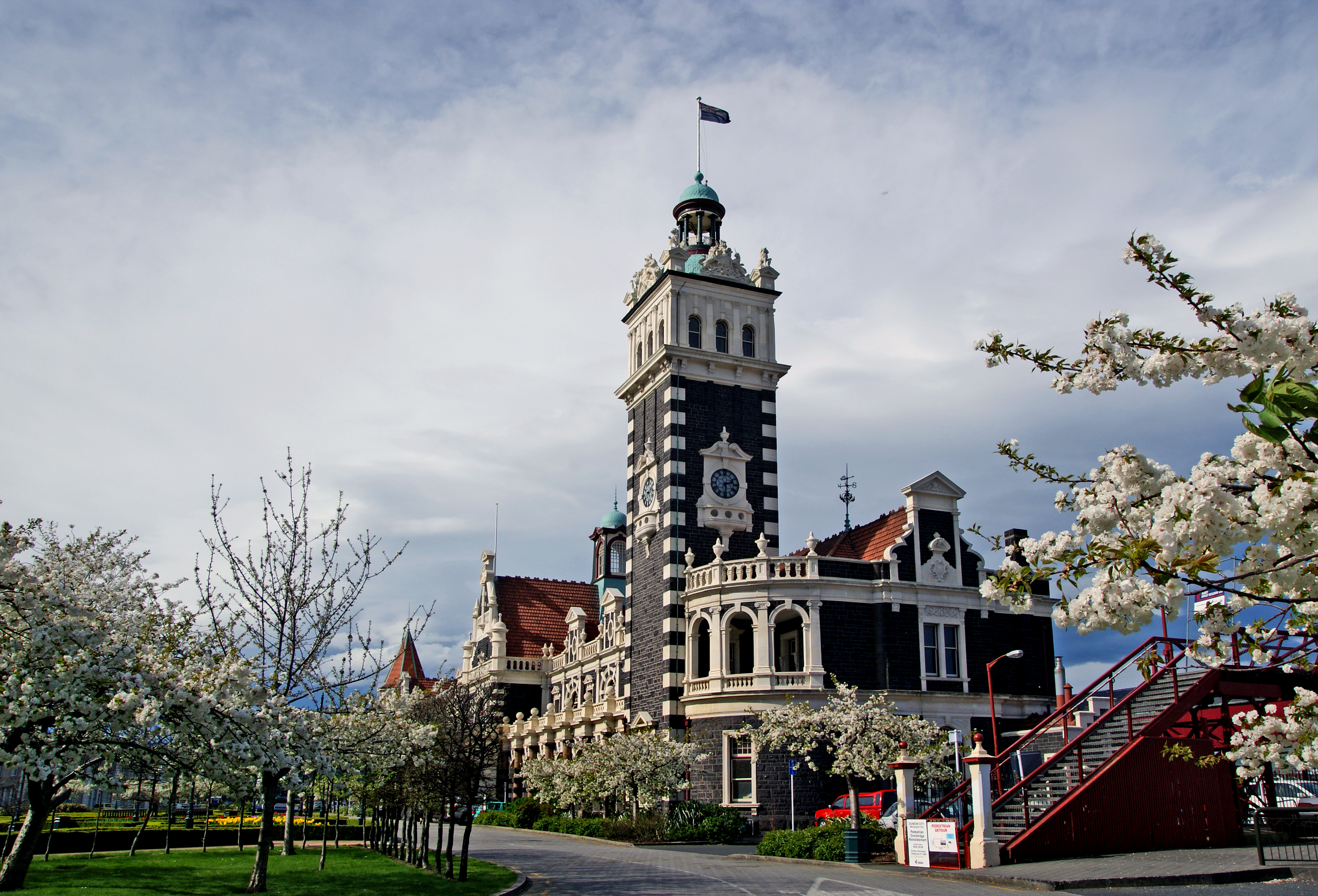
The clocktower at the south end of the station building

== Construction of the 1906 station ==
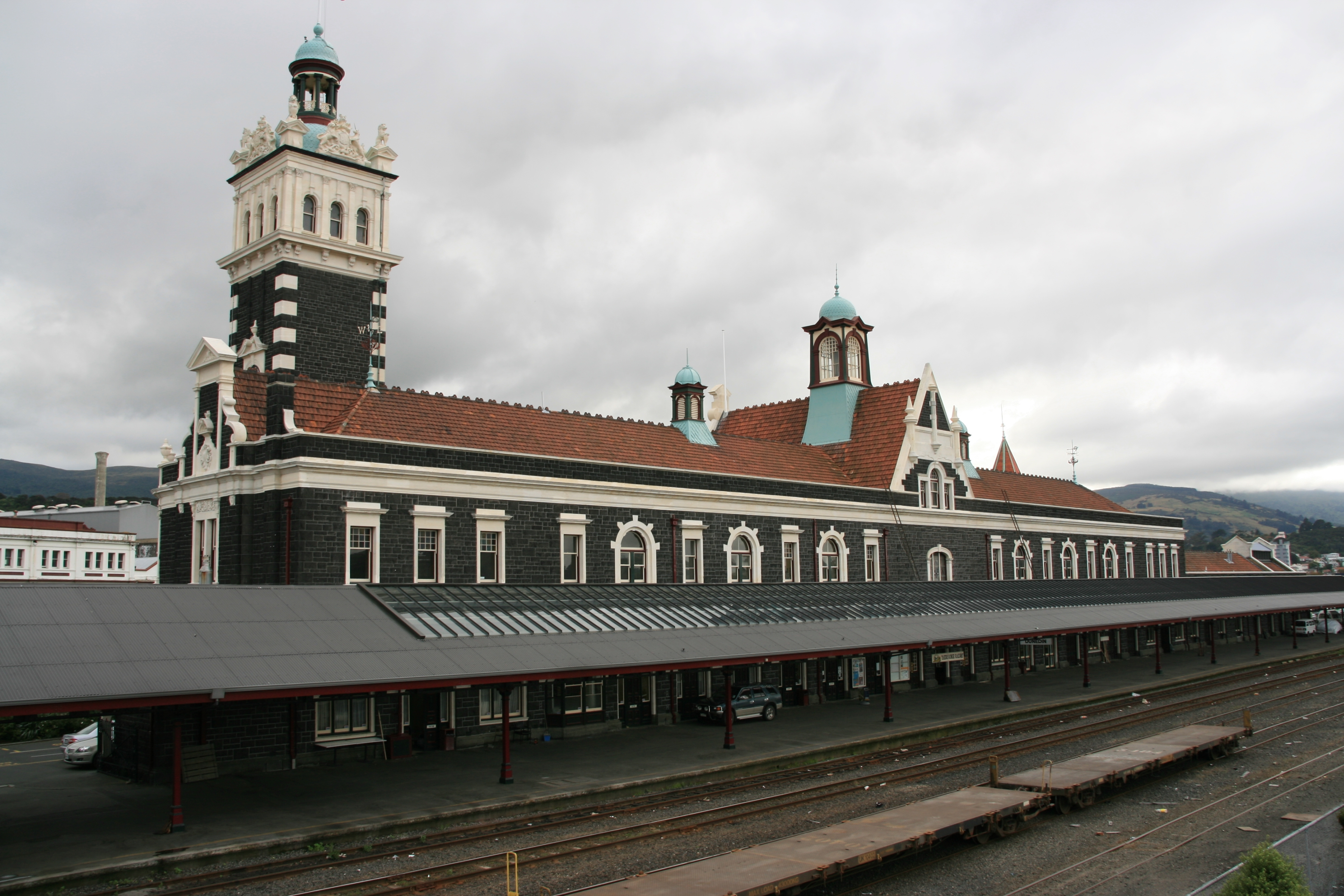
The rear of the station

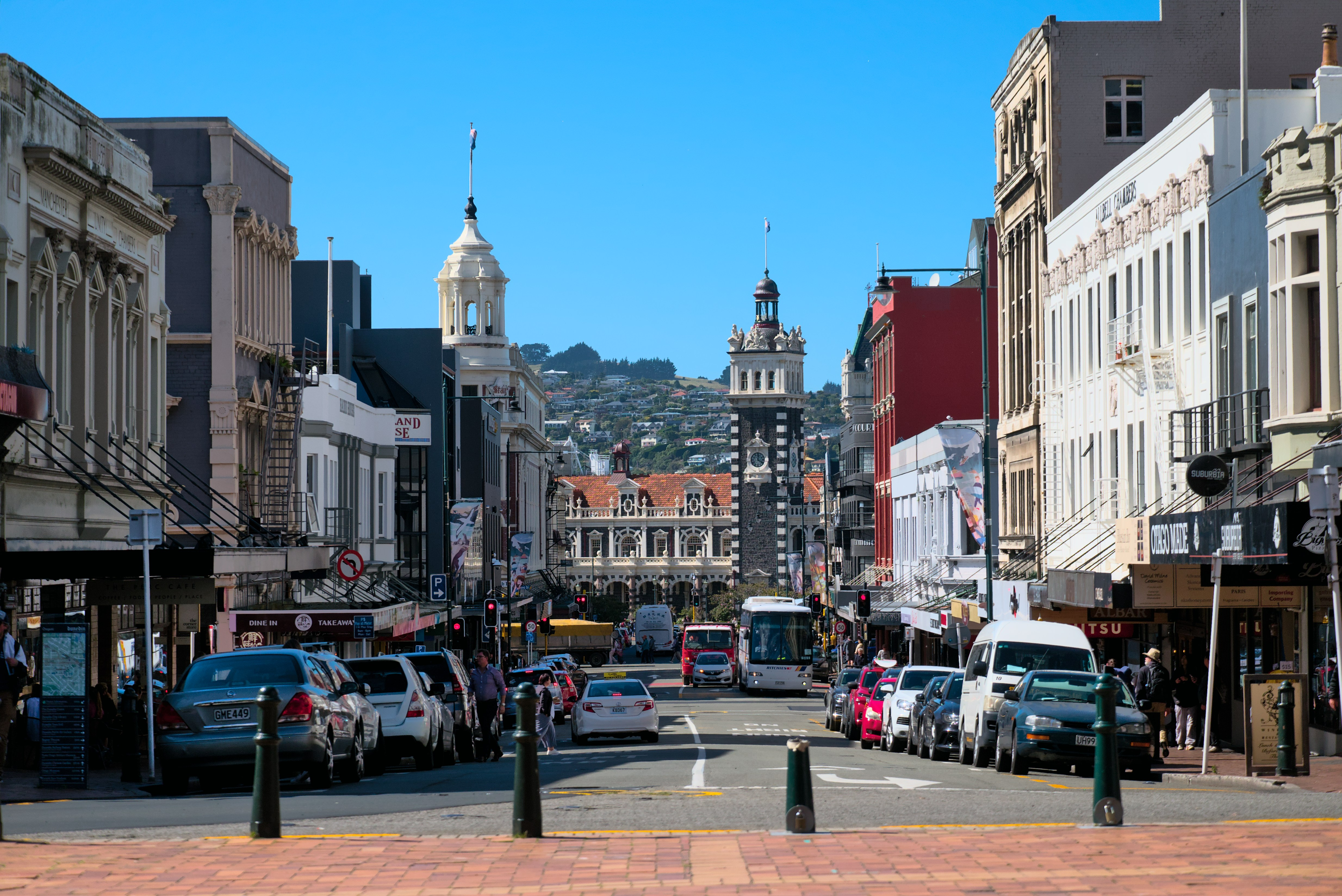
Dunedin railway station as seen from the Octagon. The station forms a terminating vista for Lower Stuart Street.

The logistics of constructing what was at the time New Zealand's busiest railway station took three years before construction began in 1903. Dunedin required a station for a wide range of activities: it was a commercial and industrial centre, close to gold and coalfields, with a hinterland that was dependent on livestock and forestry for its economy.

In an eclectic, revived Flemish renaissance style, (Renaissance Revival architecture), the station is constructed of dark basalt from Kokonga in the Strath-Taieri with lighter Oamaru stone facings, giving it the distinctive light and dark pattern common to many of the grander buildings of Dunedin and Christchurch. Pink granite was used for a series of supporting pillars which line a colonnade at the front. The roof was tiled in terracotta shingles from Marseille surmounted by copper-domed cupolas. The southern end is dominated by the 37-metre clocktower visible from much of central Dunedin.

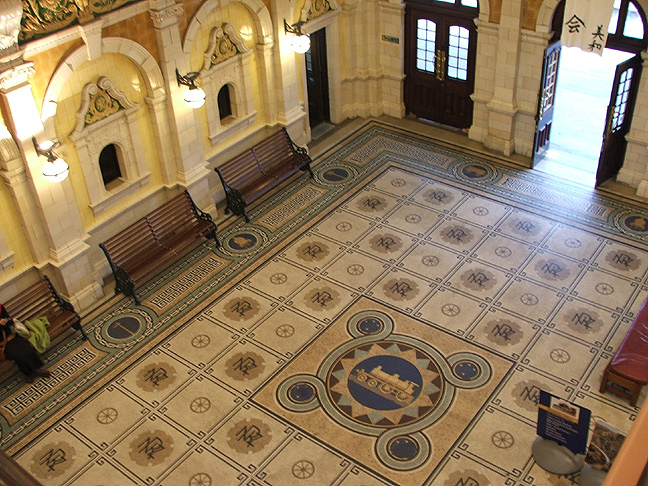
Interior of the station, showing the booking hall's mosaic floor

The booking hall features a mosaic floor of almost 750,000 Minton tiles, completely renewed in 1965, in an exact replica. A frieze of Royal Doulton porcelain runs around the balcony above it from which the floor's design, featuring a locomotive and related symbols, can be clearly seen. The main platform when built was described as "considerably the greatest thing of its kind in the colony". The platforms had a total length of 2,860 ft (870 m) feet and the main platform was 1,570 ft (480 m) long.

The foundation stone was laid by the Minister of Railways Joseph Ward on 3 June 1904. The Prime Minister Richard Seddon was also present. The station was officially opened by Ward, by then Prime Minister, on 12 November 1906. Construction was kept within budget, and cost £40,000.

== History ==
In its early days the station was the country's busiest, handling up to 100 trains a day, including suburban services to Mosgiel and Port Chalmers, railcars to Palmerston and the Otago Central Railway and other trains to Christchurch and Invercargill. The city's economic decline and the reduction in the prominence of rail transport means that only a handful of trains use the station today.

The station used to have dock platforms at both the north and south ends and a crossover midway along the main platform. Large shunting yards, most of which have now gone, occupied land to the south. Much of this land has now been subdivided into wholesale and light industrial properties.

With the decrease in passenger rail traffic, the station now serves more functions than the one for which it was designed. Bought by the Dunedin City Council in 1994, its uses have greatly diversified, though it still caters for the Dunedin Railways tourist trains. Much of the ground floor is used as a restaurant, and the upper floor is home to both the New Zealand Sports Hall of Fame and the Otago Art Society. A produce market, the Otago Farmers Market, is held in the grounds to the north every Saturday morning. Every year in March, the station takes centre stage in the South Island's main fashion show, with the main platform becoming reputedly the world's longest catwalk.

A thorough refurbishment of the exterior took place in the late 1990s, accompanied by the landscaping of the gardens outside the entrance in Anzac Square.

In October 2006 its centenary was celebrated with a festival of railway events, including the operation of eight steam railway locomotives from all over New Zealand. In 2006 it was recognised by DK Eyewitness Travel as one of "The World's 200 Must-See Places".

On 12 February 2008, a container wagon struck and partially destroyed the historic footbridge at the southern end of the station, joining Anzac Square with the industrial zone close to the wharves. Four people were on the bridge, with one suffering minor injuries when she fell 4.5 metres. Reconstruction of a footbridge of similar design on the same site was carried out in September–October 2008.

In 2013, baker Steve Mee from the Scenic Southern Cross Hotel recreated the station in gingerbread. It was 1.5m long and entirely edible, being constructed of gingerbread, icing and chocolate.

In 2020 the railway station was used for filming scenes for the movie The Power of the Dog, for which Jane Campion won the Academy Award for Best Director.

== Anzac Square and Anzac Avenue ==
Anzac "Square" is the triangular green area marked (6). The black line is the railway.

Immediately outside the station is Anzac Square, which, despite its name, is roughly triangular in shape, and was extensively remodelled and extended in the 1990s to create a formal knot garden. Directly across the square is Lower Stuart Street, which leads to the city's centre, The Octagon, from where the station is clearly visible as a major landmark. The station thus forms a terminating vista for Lower Stuart Street.

The square is at the southern end of Anzac Avenue, a kilometre-long tree-lined street running roughly parallel to the railway, which leads to Logan Park. The central part of Anzac Avenue is part of State Highway 88, which links the central city with its port facilities at Port Chalmers, and was the southern end until 2011 when construction of the Forsyth Barr Stadium at University Plaza required re-routing of part of the highway.

Logan Park was the site of the 1925 New Zealand and South Seas Exhibition, and the avenue and square were named to commemorate the Australian and New Zealand Army Corps, the "ANZACs", who were New Zealand's main military force during the First World War. After the refurbishment of the square, a large plaque dedicated to New Zealand's Victoria Cross recipients was relocated to its northern end, close to the start of Anzac Avenue. This has since been relocated again, and now stands close to the city's main war memorial, the Dunedin Cenotaph in Queen's Gardens, 400 metres to the south.

== Transport services ==
The station was served by daily sightseeing trains to Middlemarch or Pukerangi via the Taieri Gorge, and to Palmerston.
