= Waitangi Park =

Recreation space in Te Aro, Wellington, New Zealand

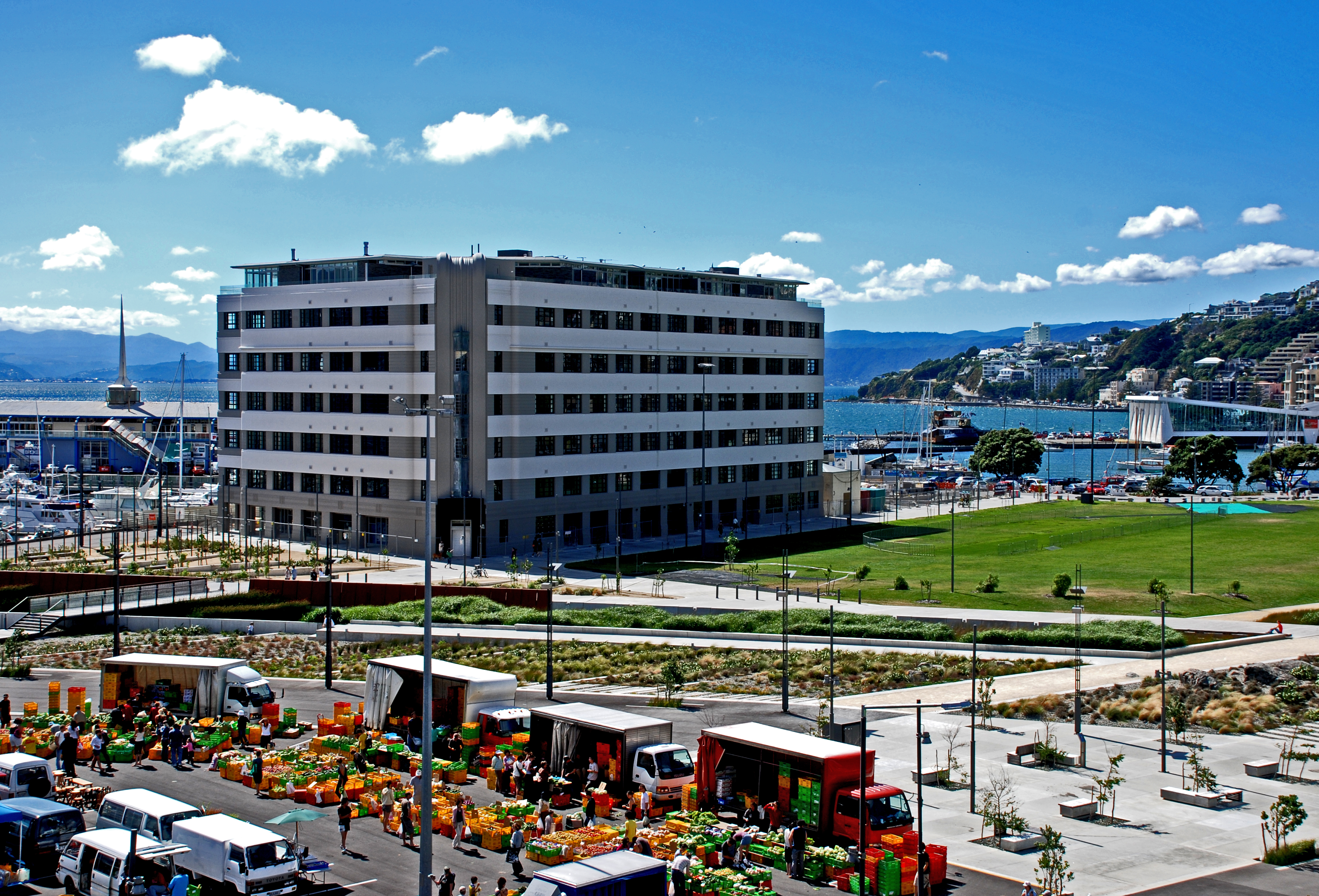
- Waitangi Park in March 2007. In the foreground is the Sunday market.
- Interactive map of Waitangi Park
- Location: Wellington, New Zealand
- Coordinates: 41.29137°S 174.78482°E
- Area: 6.5 ha (16 acres)
- Created: 2006
- Operator: Wellington City Council

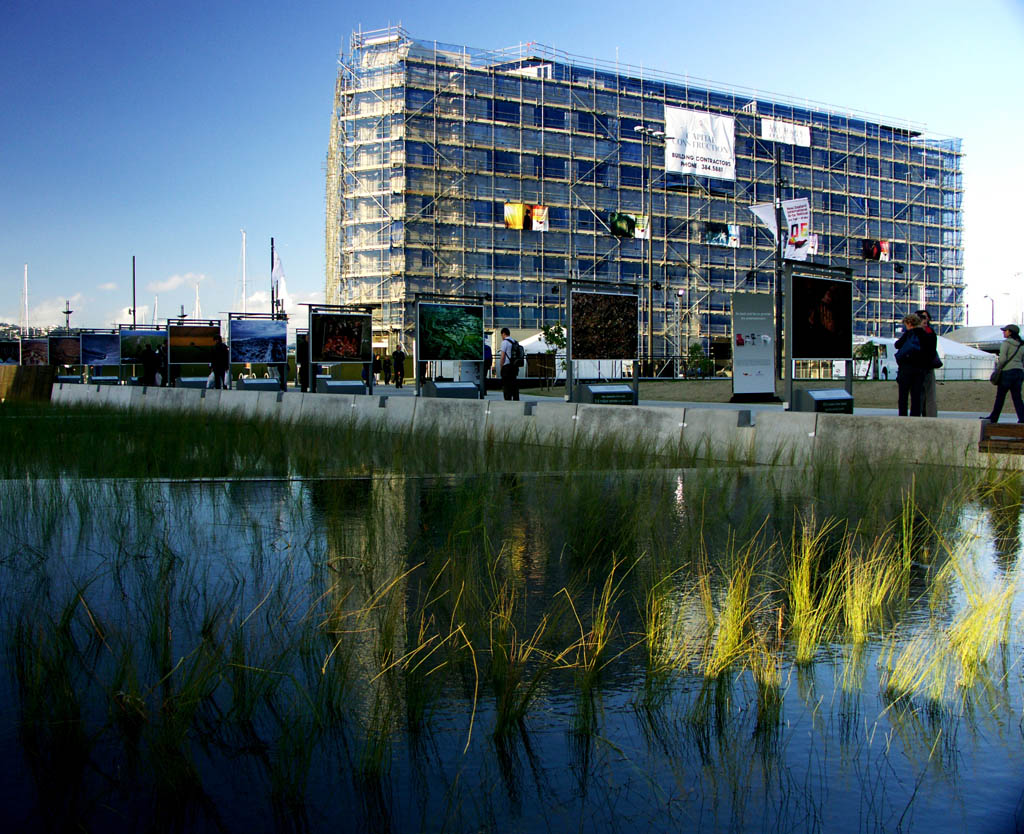
The Waitangi Park wetlands. In the background are the Chaffers Dock Apartments (in the Former Post and Telegraph Building)

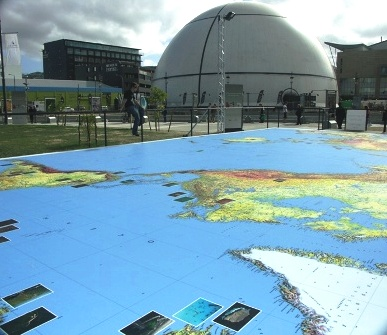
Waitangi Park showing walk-on world map and Les Arts Sauts performance dome

Waitangi Park is a remodelled recreational space in Te Aro, Wellington, New Zealand, that was opened in 2006. It lies near Te Papa (the National Museum of New Zealand), Former Post and Telegraph Building and Courtenay Place. The facility includes a waka-launching area, a children's playground, a skateboard zone, and a large grassy space.

== Geography and history ==
The Waitangi stream formerly flowed from around Wellington Hospital in Newtown along Adelaide Road to the Basin Reserve and then along what is now Kent and Cambridge Terraces. Its outlet was the Waitangi lagoon or swamp, formed by a shingle beach which periodically gave way, causing clumps of flax and toetoe to float out into the harbour. The lagoon used to harbour eel, fish, and shellfish, and was used by Māori for food gathering, fresh water, and waka launching. Early European settlers planned to dig a canal along the stream to use what is now the Basin Reserve as a harbour, but the 1855 earthquake uplifted the land and made this impractical. The stream was piped underground instead. The wetlands in the redeveloped Waitangi Park are fed by the outflow from the Waitangi stream, now lifted from stormwater drains and caused to flow through gravel and grass as part of the park's development.

Wellingtonians formerly referred to the Waitangi Park area as Chaffers Park. Chaffers Park was created after industrial buildings on the site were demolished. Chaffers Marina adjoining the area was opened in 1993.

=== Redevelopment into Waitangi Park ===
Wraight Athfield Landscape Architecture (WALA) won the competition held to design the park. WALA saw the design through to completion in 2005. The redevelopment of the park won a number of awards from the New Zealand Institute of Landscape Architects, the New Zealand Institute of Architects and the Wellington Civic Trust, among others.

As part of the redevelopment, on the north-east side of the park the former Herd St Post Office was developed into lifestyle-apartments and into a commercial space called Chaffers Dock Apartments.

The redeveloped park was officially opened in March 2006. The redevelopment project cost a total of $22 million.

The New Zealand Construction Industry Council (NZCIC) criticised the construction tendering process for the park, arguing that under-tendering caused problems. According to the NZCIC, the "initial tender accepted for the development at Waitangi Park was $2.1 million less than the estimated cost of the project, and at least $2.6 million below tenders from two other companies."

== Events ==
Numerous events have taken place at Waitangi Park, these include:

- In early 2006 the "Earth From Above" exhibition occurred at Waitangi Park. The exhibition consisted of a series of photographs by Yann Arthus-Bertrand and raised questions about sustainable development.
- During the 2006 "International Festival of the Arts" a series of live performances, both by local artists (such as Salmonella Dub, The Warratahs, The Phoenix Foundation, Fat Freddys Drop) and by international acts selected from the festival (such as Antonio Forcione from Italy and The Sharon Shannon Band from Ireland)

Regular events include:

- Waitangi Park Market. Fruit and vegetable market. Open hours: Sunday 7am - 12pm.
- Petanque
- Skateboarding
- Waka-launching
