= Former Post and Telegraph Building, Wellington =

Building in Wellington, New Zealand

Former Post & Telegraph Building
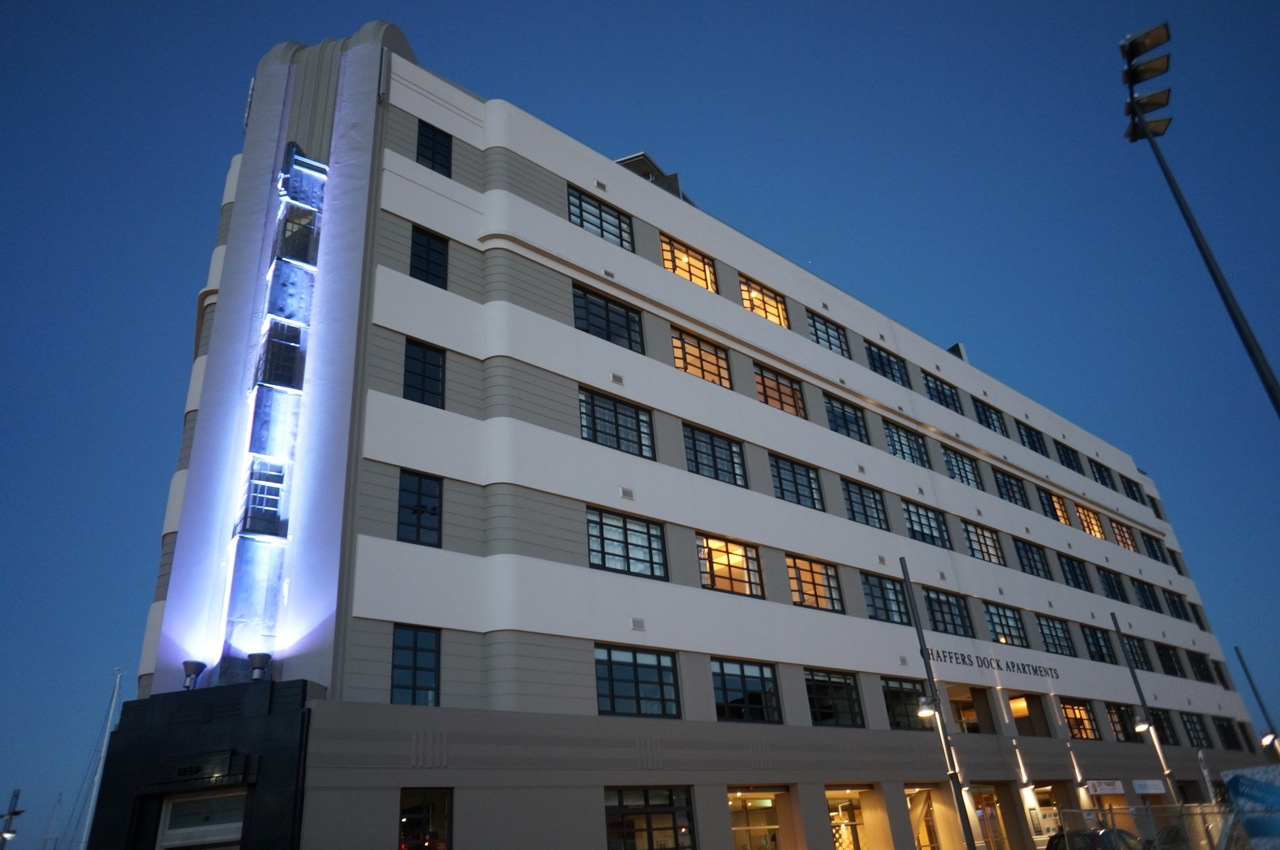
- The building at night in 2012
- Interactive map of the Former Post & Telegraph Building area

General information
- Architectural style: Art Deco
- Location: Herd and Chaffers Streets, Wellington, New Zealand
- Coordinates: 41.290849°S 174.784766°E
- Completed: 1939

Design and construction
- Architect: Edmund Anscombe

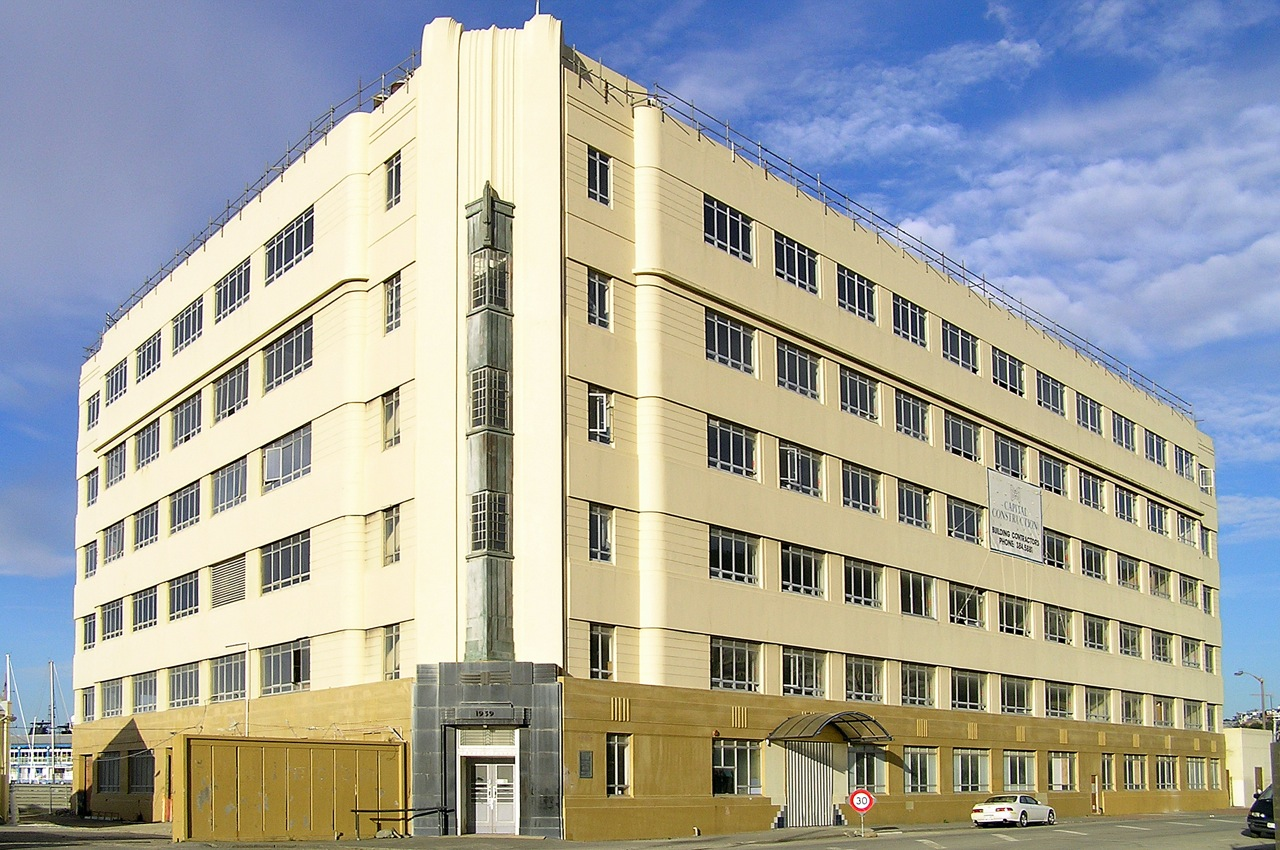
The building in 2005 before renovation

The former Post and Telegraph Building, now known as Chaffers Dock Apartments, is a building located in Wellington, New Zealand.

The building, located on Herd Street, was designed by Edmund Anscombe and built in 1939. The building is situated on reclaimed land, and sits on about 400 concrete piles up to 18m long. It originally had two full-size tennis courts on the roof, but these were demolished during World War II to make way for a sixth storey. The building ceased to be used by New Zealand Post in the late 1980s.

The building was refurbished in the mid-2000s, and currently houses a mix of apartments, restaurants and shops. It has a Category II listing with Heritage New Zealand.
