= Percy Sargood =

New Zealand businessman and philanthropist

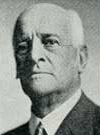
Percy Sargood

Sir Percy Rolfe Sargood (1865–1940) was a New Zealand businessman and philanthropist. He was born in Melbourne, Victoria, Australia, in 1865.

In the 1935 New Year Honours, Sargood was appointed a Knight Bachelor, for public services. He was posthumously inducted into the New Zealand Business Hall of Fame in 2011.
