= Harwood, New Zealand =

Harwood
- Interactive map of Harwood
- Coordinates: 45.814°S 170.677°E
- Country: New Zealand
- Region: Otago
- Territorial authority: Dunedin
- Community board: Otago Peninsula Community Board
- Electorates: Dunedin; Te Tai Tonga (Māori)

Government
  - Territorial authority: Dunedin City Council
  - Regional council: Otago Regional Council
  - Mayor of Dunedin: Sophie Barker
  - Dunedin MP: Rachel Brooking
  - Te Tai Tonga MP: Tākuta Ferris

Area
  - Total: 1.51 km^{2} (0.58 sq mi)

Population (June 2025)
  - Total: 240
  - Density: 160/km^{2} (410/sq mi)
- Time zone: UTC+12 (NZST)
  - Summer (DST): UTC+13 (NZDT)
- Local iwi: Ngāi Tahu

Harwood is a rural settlement on the northern side of the Otago Peninsula. It is within the boundaries of Dunedin city in New Zealand.

Before 2000, most of the houses were cribs, but they have since been upgraded and become permanent residences.

The area is named for Octavius Harwood and his family, who was an employee at Weller brothers' whaling station and moved here from Otakou in the 1870s and farmed cattle.

== Demographics ==
Harwood is described by Statistics New Zealand as a rural settlement. It covers 1.51 km^{2} (0.58 sq mi), and had an estimated population of 240 as of June 2025, with a population density of 159 people per km^{2}. It is part of the much larger Otago Peninsula statistical area.

Historical population
Year	Pop.	±% p.a.
2006	216	—
2013	207	−0.61%
2018	231	+2.22%

Harwood had a population of 231 at the 2018 New Zealand census, an increase of 24 people (11.6%) since the 2013 census, and an increase of 15 people (6.9%) since the 2006 census. There were 108 households, comprising 114 males and 117 females, giving a sex ratio of 0.97 males per female. The median age was 53.0 years (compared with 37.4 years nationally), with 39 people (16.9%) aged under 15 years, 21 (9.1%) aged 15 to 29, 114 (49.4%) aged 30 to 64, and 60 (26.0%) aged 65 or older.

Ethnicities were 93.5% European/Pākehā, 16.9% Māori, 1.3% Pasifika, 0.0% Asian, and 2.6% other ethnicities. People may identify with more than one ethnicity.

Although some people chose not to answer the census's question about religious affiliation, 68.8% had no religion, 15.6% were Christian, 1.3% were Buddhist and 1.3% had other religions.

Of those at least 15 years old, 39 (20.3%) people had a bachelor's or higher degree, and 42 (21.9%) people had no formal qualifications. The median income was $23,000, compared with $31,800 nationally. 15 people (7.8%) earned over $70,000 compared to 17.2% nationally. The employment status of those at least 15 was that 69 (35.9%) people were employed full-time, 39 (20.3%) were part-time, and 9 (4.7%) were unemployed.
