= Weller brothers =

Merchant traders in the 1830s

The Weller brothers, Englishmen of Sydney, Australia, and Otago, New Zealand, were the founders of multiple whaling stations in South Island, most notably on Otago Harbour (Te Awa Ōtākou in Te Reo Māori), and were New Zealand's most substantial merchant traders in the 1830s.

Their Otakou whaling station became an important part of the local history, including the naming of the "Otago" region. The Weller's Rock (Te Umu Kuri) was a whale lookout point near Harington Point on the peninsula (at 45°47′52″S 170°42′54″E), which is named after the brothers and became a historic site. The global hit ballad "Wellerman" refers to their whaling business in Otago.

== Immigration ==
Members of a wealthy land-owning family from Folkestone, Kent, they moved serially to Australia, partly to alleviate Joseph Brooks Weller's tuberculosis. Joseph Brooks left England on 20 October 1823. He arrived in Hobart on 4 February 1824 and then went to Sydney. After 18 months he returned to England, and left there for good on 1 January 1827 accompanied by Edward. In the meantime George had already left England and arrived in Australia in March 1826, where he bought a 479-ton vessel, the Albion. By 1830 Joseph Brooks, Edward, George and his new wife, Elizabeth (formerly Barwise), their parents, Joseph (1766–1857) and Mary (née Brooks) (b. 1779), and two sisters, Fanny (1812–1896) and Ann (1822–1887), were all in Sydney.

The brothers became involved in whaling in Sydney. Two of their vessels made 13 whaling voyages from Port Jackson between 1833 and 1841. The brothers, Joseph Brooks (1802–1835), George (1805–1875) and Edward (1814–1893), founded their establishment at Otago Heads in 1831, the first enduring European settlement in what is now the City of Dunedin.

Coastal whales, most notably southern right whales (Tohorā), (Note: Other Te Reo Māori names are Tohoraha, Kewa, and Raiti Wēra.) the "right whale to hunt" and the most closely associated whale species with Aotearoa, and humpback whales (Paikea) were plentiful back then, and Otago's coastlines (in particular Otago Harbour) were among the prominent habitats for the former on the mainland. The brothers simultaneously carried out their first yet not serious whaling there, two years prior to the opening of the prominent "Ōtākou" station in 1833. This was one of pioneering operations in New Zealand, only several years after the first shore-based stations at Cuttle Cove in Preservation Inlet (Rakituma) and Te Awaiti Bay in Queen Charlotte Sound (Tōtaranui).

== Development of trading ==
Joseph Brooks Weller interested himself in flax and timber trading at the Hokianga. In 1831 he called at William Cook's shipbuilding settlement at Stewart Island/Rakiura to commission a vessel before visiting Otago in the Sir George Murray, reaching an agreement with Tahatu and claiming territory for William IV. He returned in the Lucy Ann with goods and gear to establish a whaling station, (it is believed with Edward) in November. George and his wife came too, or arrived soon after.

The Wellers continued to trade in flax and spars, maintaining operations at the Hokianga even as they developed Otago. At that time and throughout the decade they were the only merchants regularly trading from one end of New Zealand to the other. A fire soon destroyed the Otago station, but it was rebuilt. Edward was kidnapped by Māori in the far north and ransomed. Whale products started flowing from Otago in 1833 where Joseph Brooks based himself and European women went to settle.

At 21 Edward became the resident manager while George maintained the Sydney end of the business. At this time there were 80 Europeans at Otago which had become a trading, transshipment and ship service center as well as a whaling station, the "Ōtākou" station ranging between Harington Point and Harwood, as well as Taiaroa Head as a whale lookout point.

== Further developments ==
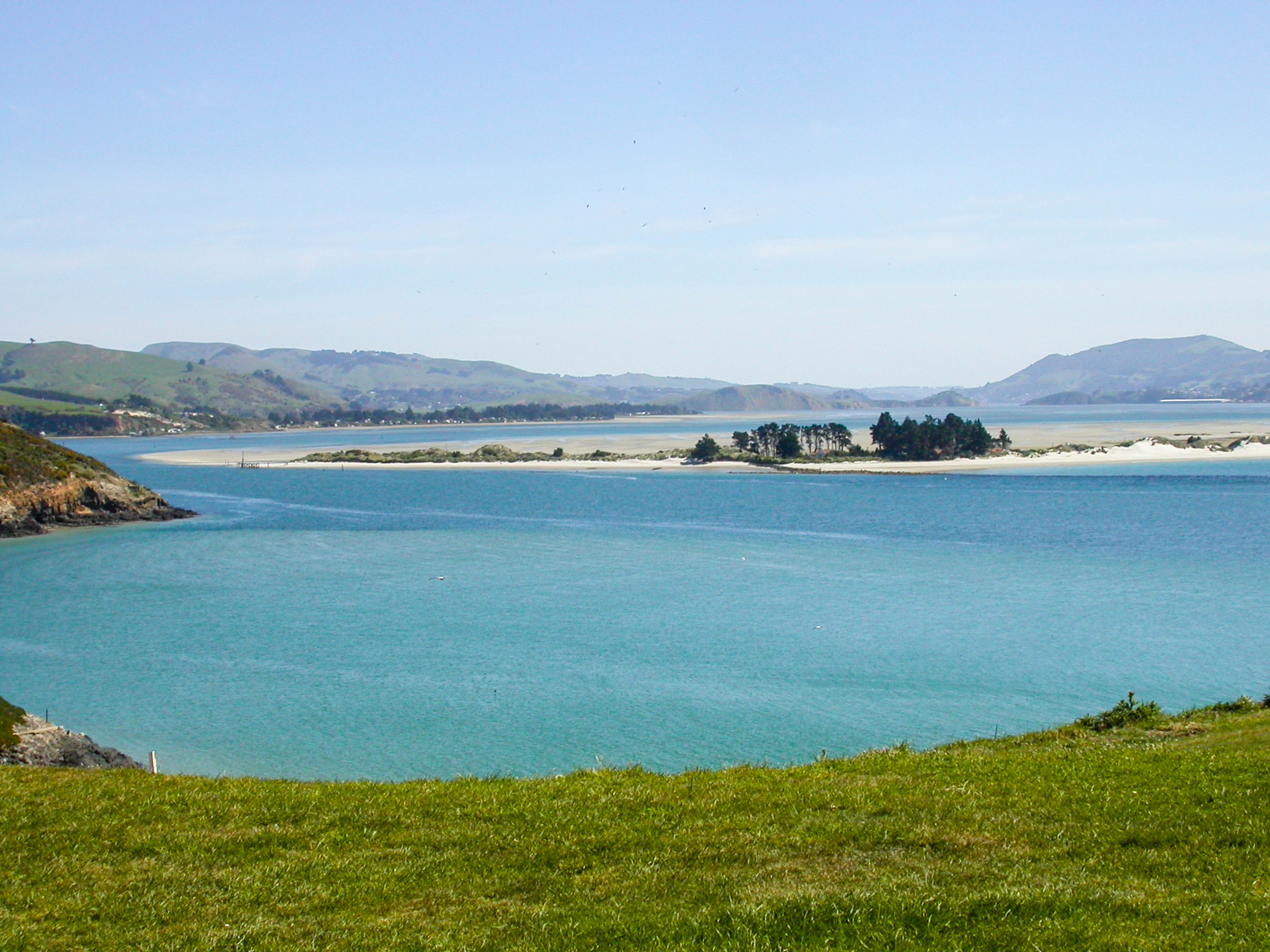
Panorama of the Weller brothers' Otago Harbour ("Ōtākou") whaling ground, looking from Taiaroa Head toward the three stations operated by the brothers: Pilots Beach, Ōtākou, and Te Rauone Beach.

New fisheries were established inside the harbour and up and down the coast. The Wellers' ships sailed beyond Australasia and they tested the tax regime preventing direct shipment of whale products to Britain. By the end of the 1830s, exports of whale products were at a peak, the station taking about 300 right whales on the first season, and was the main site of the resident European population in the region. Anticipating British annexation, the Wellers started buying land and settling it.

At its peak in 1834, the Ōtākou station was producing 310 tons of whale oil a year. and became the center of a network of seven stations that formed a highly profitable enterprise for the Wellers, employing as many as 85 people at Otago alone. From the Ōtākou base the Wellers branched out into industries as diverse as "timber, spars, flax, potatoes, dried fish, Māori artefacts, and even tattooed Māori heads which were in keen demand in Sydney". However, given that the Colony of New Zealand would not be declared until 1840, the Wellers were treated as foreign traders and were affected by protectionist British import tariffs on whale oil.

With the success of the Ōtākou station, the brothers extended whaling grounds from Akaroa on Banks Peninsula in north to Stewart Island in south, with three stations (Ōtākou, Pilots Beach, Te Rauone Beach) within Otago Harbour and at least five others between Pūrākaunui and Banks Peninsula including additional Otago stations in Timaru and on Taieri Island, where they lost the ship Dublin Packet in 1839.

Their operations drew attentions from other whalers including Johnny Jones, leading to the expansion of the industry broadly over the mainlands, and establishments of (directly) competing stations in Otago and southern Canterbury, such as at Blueskin Bay, Waikouaiti and Karitane by Jones and Charles Bayley, Onekakara and Fleur's Place in Moeraki, Mutumutu and Pātītī Points in Timaru, Molyneux Bay and Willsher Bay nearby Kaka Point, Nugget Point, and Tautuku Peninsula. Additional foreign whalers, such as from America, England, the Netherlands and Russia, entered into the market, and produced about 400–600 tons of oils in Otago Harbour as late as 1846.

However, the industry was short-lived in general due to depletions of local whale stocks and dwindling catches. Still, Ōtākou was the most notable station for being the earliest in the region, the longest-operating in southern South Island, the biggest and the most productive in the nation, and for its social and economic impacts on local communities. The last station in Otago was closed about 1848, when the whalers ventured to the West Coast and the Fiordland to seek after the remnants of the whales. The station at Pātītī Point in Timaru may have lasted into the 1860s.

Sudden decline in whales saw Edward's exit at the end of 1840 followed by the firm's bankruptcy, as the last season produced only 10 tons of oils. The brothers purchased land across the country, owning nearly 3 million acres (12,000 km^{2}) by 1840. Edward and George lived out their lives in New South Wales. The management of the Ōtākou whaling operations was taken over in 1840 by Charles Schultze (1818–1879), who had married the Weller brothers' sister Ann Weller, along with an employee, Octavius Harwood (1816–1900) who became the name origin of Harwood.

In 1835 Joseph Brooks was the first of the three to die, of tuberculosis in Otago; Edward shipped his remains to Sydney in a puncheon of rum. George and Edward eventually settled at Maitland, New South Wales, and died there in 1849 and 1893 respectively due to a stroke and a flood.

Local whale populations had collapsed, and especially southern right whales (Tohorā) became commercially extinct. Through extensive commercial and illegal whaling operations,ranging from subantarctic islands in south to Kermadec Islands in north and Chatham Islands in east, they underwent a significant population bottleneck and were at one point thought being completely lost from Aotearoa, until the opportunistic detection of a breeding ground at the subantarctic Auckland Islands in 1980. While whale populations show some recoveries and their returns to the mainland coasts (especially among some regions including Otago) are anticipated, right whales have not re-established such traditional habitats, presumably due to the loss of migratory knowledges after decimations, along with for additional factors including habitat degradations, particularly for Otago Harbour.

== Relationship with Māori ==
The whalers depended on good relations with the local Māori people and the whaling industry integrated Māori into the global economy, despite Māori lacking historical engagements in active whaling activities prior to the arrival of Europeans. This produced hundreds of intermarriages between whalers and local Māori, including Edward Weller himself, who was twice strategically married to Māori women, thus linking the Wellers to one of the most prominent local Māori families, the Ellisons. Edward's first wife was Tahatu's daughter Paparu. After her death, he married Nikuru, the daughter of chief Taiaroa. Their daughters were Fanny (Pane Wera in Te Reo Māori), born to Papauru, and Nani Weller, child of Nikuru. Meanwhile, relations with Maori were often tense and became strained at times; the establishment being ransacked and the Wellers keeping Māori hostages in Sydney, reverberations from earlier conflicts, so called "Sealers' War", with occasions of the brothers themselves being kidnapped and attacked.

Additionally, arrivals of whaling ships from Sydney presumably triggered a measles epidemic which greatly reduced the Māori population in the region.

== Legacy ==
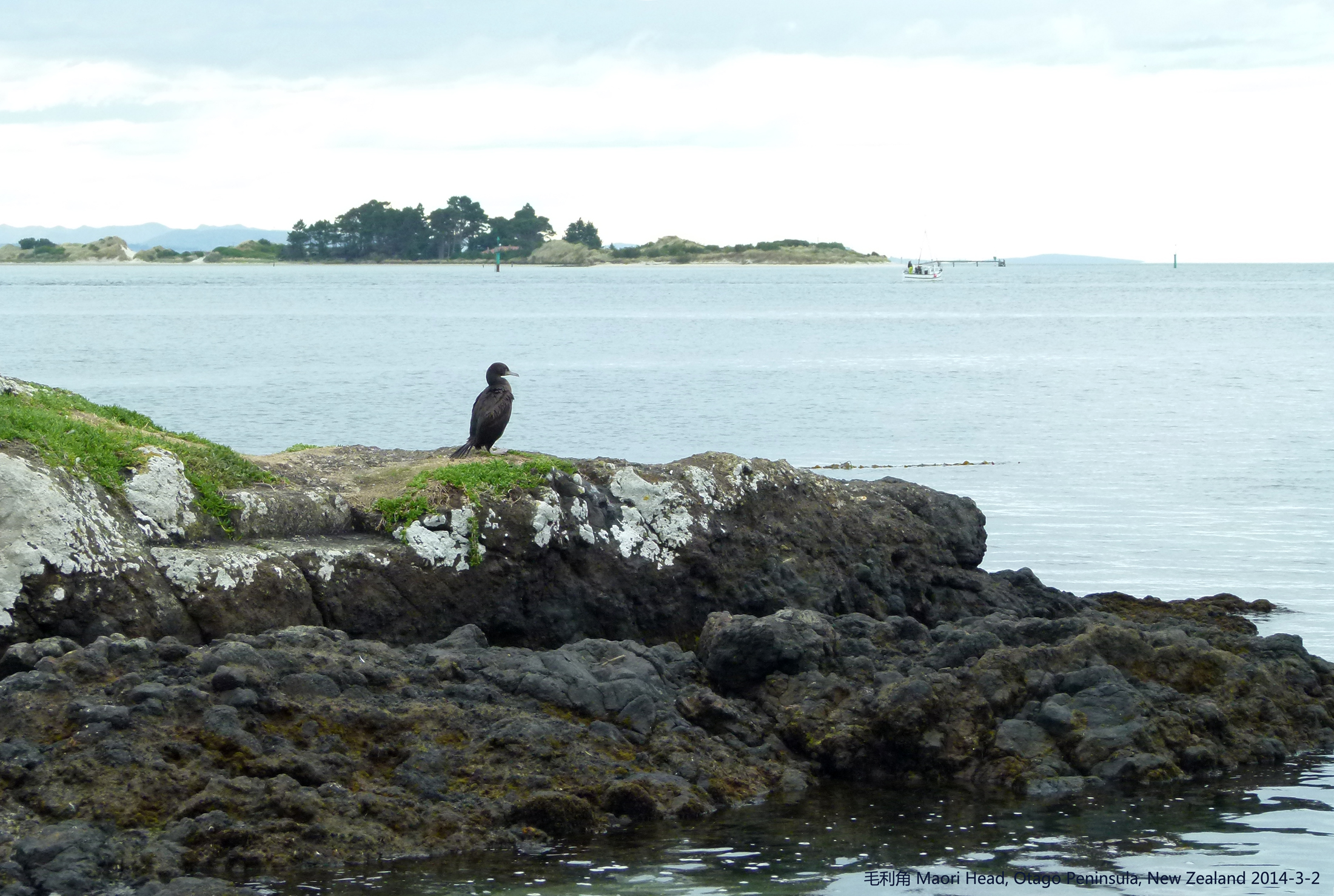
The Weller's Rock (Te Umu Kuri)

Weller Brothers' whaling activity and its association with local Māori were noteworthy in early history of European settlers in the southeastern region of the South Island, and "Otakou" consequently became the name origin of Otago. The settlement of Otago reached a nadir in 1842 but ultimately revived, remaining the center of port operations in the area until after the establishment of Port Chalmers and Dunedin. Ōtākou is now a suburb within the boundaries of Dunedin.

In January 2020, Te Runanga o Otakou, the Dunedin City Council, and the Department of Conservation joined forces in a project to protect the Weller's Rock (Te Umu Kuri) from degradation.

"Wellerman" is a ballad (often erroneously referred to as a sea shanty) that refers to the wellermen, the supply ships owned by the trading company set up by the Weller Brothers. The song was originally collected around 1966 by the New Zealand-based music teacher and folk song compiler, Neil Colquhoun. The song has been performed and remixed many times in the twentieth and twenty-first century, with over ten recorded renditions between 1967 and 2005, and by British band The Longest Johns in 2018 and Scottish singer Nathan Evans in 2020.
