= Molyneux Bay =

Bay in Otago, New Zealand

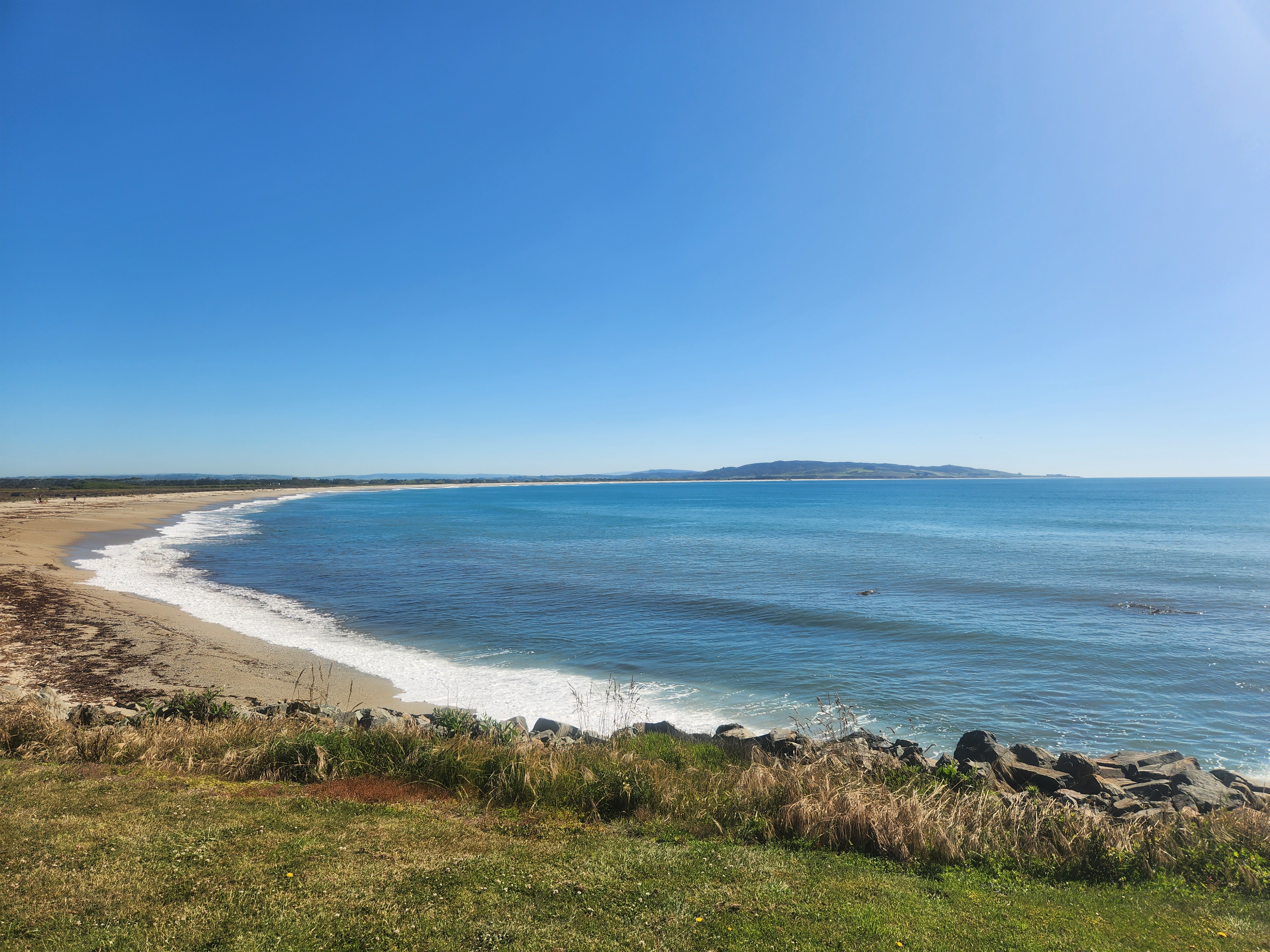
- Looking north from Kaka Point across Molyneux Bay

- Location within New Zealand
- Location: Clutha District, Otago, New Zealand
- Coordinates: 46°22′S 169°48′E
- Etymology: Named after Robert Molyneux, sailing master on HMS Endeavour
- Part of: Pacific Ocean
- River sources: Clutha River / Mata-Au (Koau and Matau Rivers), Pūerua River
- Max. width: 12 kilometres (7.5 mi)
- Settlements: Kaka Point, Port Molyneux

Molyneux Bay is a bay on the south east coast of the South Island in the Otago Region of New Zealand. The bay is the location of the mouth of the Clutha River / Mata-Au and the estuarial river island of Inch Clutha. It stretches for some 12 kilometres (7.5 mi) and is bounded in the northeast by a small promontory close to Summer Hill and in the southwest by the headland of Kaka Point.

== Naming ==
The name of the bay first appears on James Cook's charts mapped during his first voyage. It was named after Robert Molyneux (or Molineux), the sailing master of HMS Endeavour, who died on the return voyage to England.

== History ==
The former settlement of Port Molyneux stood on the shore of Molyneux Bay until a major flood altered the course of the river, making the port unviable.
