= Dunedin (electorate) =

- Single-member general constituency for the New Zealand House of Representatives
- Interactive map of boundaries from the 2026 election
- Formation: 2020
- Region: Otago
- Character: Urban and suburban
- Term: 3 years

Member for Dunedin
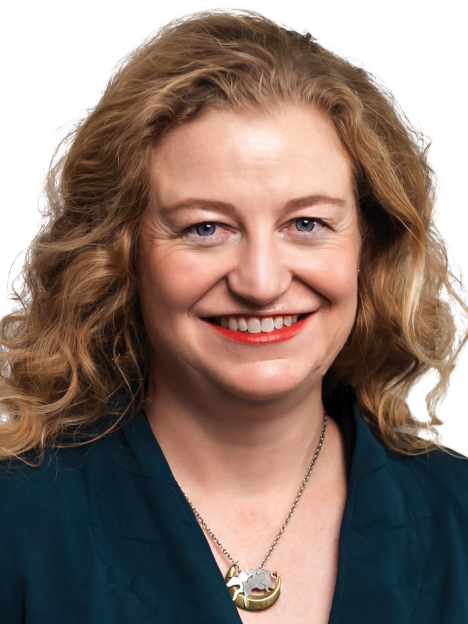
- Rachel Brooking since 14 October 2023
- Party: Labour
- List MPs: Francisco Hernandez (Green)
- Previous MP: David Clark (Labour)
Party vote distribution

Dunedin is an electorate to the New Zealand House of Representatives. It was created for the 2020 election.

== Population centres ==
The Dunedin electorate consists of the central, north and western suburbs of Dunedin, the Otago Peninsula communities of Harington Point, Otakou, Harwood, Portobello, Broad Bay, Company Bay, Pukehiki, Macandrew Bay, Waverley, Shiel Hill and Ocean Grove, and the towns north of the city including Port Chalmers, Aramoana, Pūrākaunui, Waitati, Evansdale, Warrington, Seacliff, Karitane with its northern boundary north of Waikouaiti. The urban and suburban core covers the CBD, Dunedin North, City Rise, North East Valley, Pine Hill, Leith Valley, Maori Hill, Wakari, Halfway Bush, Brockville, Roslyn, Kaikorai Valley, Mornington and Maryhill.

== History ==
Map of boundaries at the 2020 and 2023 general elections

In the 2019–20 electoral boundary review, all five electorates in the Otago and Southland regions had to be adjusted as they exceeded the 5% population quota. Some electorates were over and some were under the quota, but taken together they were almost exactly on quota. Both Dunedin North and Dunedin South were significantly below quota and had to gain population. Otago Peninsula was moved from Dunedin South to Dunedin North; this area has a population of about 8,000 people. A large area from the northern part of the Dunedin North electorate (including Palmerston, Macraes, and Herbert) went to the Waitaki electorate, a loss of 2,500 people. Adding the southern Dunedin area of Otago Peninsula made it necessary for both Dunedin North and Dunedin South to be recreated under new names, with the former Dunedin North plus Otago Peninsula now called the Dunedin electorate. The former Dunedin South electorate extended into the south Otago area and the Taieri electorate was recreated.

=== Members of Parliament ===
Labour National

Election	Winner
2020 election	David Clark
2023 election	Rachel Brooking
2026 election	Rachel Brooking

=== List MPs ===
Members of Parliament elected from party lists in elections where that person also unsuccessfully contested the Dunedin electorate. Unless otherwise stated, all MPs terms began and ended at general elections.

Election	Winner
2020 election	Michael Woodhouse
2024	Francisco Hernandez (Note: Replaced James Shaw as list MP, who resigned on 5 May 2024)

== Election results ==
=== 2026 election ===
The next election will be held on 7 November 2026. Candidates for Dunedin are listed at Candidates in the 2026 New Zealand general election by electorate § Dunedin. Official results will be available after 27 November 2026.

=== 2023 election ===
2023 general election: Dunedin
Notes:	Blue background denotes the winner of the electorate vote. Pink background denotes a candidate elected from their party list. Yellow background denotes an electorate win by a list member, or other incumbent. A ✓ or ✗ denotes status of any incumbent, win or lose respectively.						
Party	Candidate	Votes	%	±%	Party votes	%	±%
Labour	Rachel Brooking	17,111	40.61		13,160	30.86	-24.30
National	Michael Woodhouse	9,131	21.67	+3.81	9,652	22.63	+8.56
Green	Francisco Hernandez	8,031	19.06		11,449	26.85	+9.11
Opportunities	Ben Peters	1,891	4.48	−0.94	1,810	4.24	+1.44
ACT	Tim Newman	1,696	4.02		2,460	5.76	+0.50
NZ First	Keegan Langeveld	1,304	3.09		2,396	5.61	+3.49
Independent	Jim O'Malley	1,272	3.01				
Legalise Cannabis	Adrian McDermott	564	1.33		159	0.37	+0.13
NZ Loyal	Steve Lawton	540	1.28		402	0.94	
New Conservative	Cyndee Elder	160	0.37		94	0.22	−0.68
Independent	Pamela Taylor	60	0.14				
Te Pāti Māori					613	1.43	+1.11
NewZeal					114	0.26	+0.13
Animal Justice					57	0.13	
Freedoms NZ					44	0.10	
Women's Rights					35	0.08	
DemocracyNZ					25	0.05	
Leighton Baker Party					19	0.04	
New Nation					18	0.04	
Informal votes		368			129		
Total valid votes		42,128			42,636		
Turnout		42,636					
Labour hold	Majority	7,980	18.94				

=== 2020 election ===
2020 general election: Dunedin
Notes:	Blue background denotes the winner of the electorate vote. Pink background denotes a candidate elected from their party list. Yellow background denotes an electorate win by a list member, or other incumbent. A ✓ or ✗ denotes status of any incumbent, win or lose respectively.						
Party	Candidate	Votes	%	±%	Party votes	%	±%
Labour	✓ David Clark	24,140	52.79	—	25,377	55.16	—
National	Michael Woodhouse	8,169	17.86	—	6,477	14.07	—
Green	Jack Brazil	6,916	15.12	—	8,165	17.74	—
Opportunities	Ben Peters	2,480	5.42	—	1,291	2.80	—
ACT	Callum Steele-MacIntosh	1,308	2.86	—	2,423	5.26	—
NZ First	Robert Griffith	817	1.78	—	978	2.12	—
New Conservative	Solomon King	506	1.10	—	415	0.90	—
Social Credit	Zariah Anjaiya-King	195	0.42	—	57	0.12	—
Advance NZ					213	0.46	—
Māori Party					151	0.32	—
Legalise Cannabis					112	0.24	—
ONE					61	0.13	—
Sustainable NZ					42	0.09	—
Outdoors					35	0.07	—
Vision NZ					9	0.01	—
TEA					8	0.01	—
Heartland					0	0.00	—
Informal votes		742			189		
Total valid votes		45,723			46,003		
Turnout		46,003					
Labour win new seat	Majority	15,521	33.94				
