= Harington Point =

Settlement in Dunedin, New Zealand

Harington Point, often incorrectly spelt Harrington Point, is a settlement at the northeastern end of Otago Peninsula, lying within the boundaries of the city of Dunedin, New Zealand. It was named after Thomas Cudbert Harington, the first secretary of the New Zealand Company.

== Geography ==
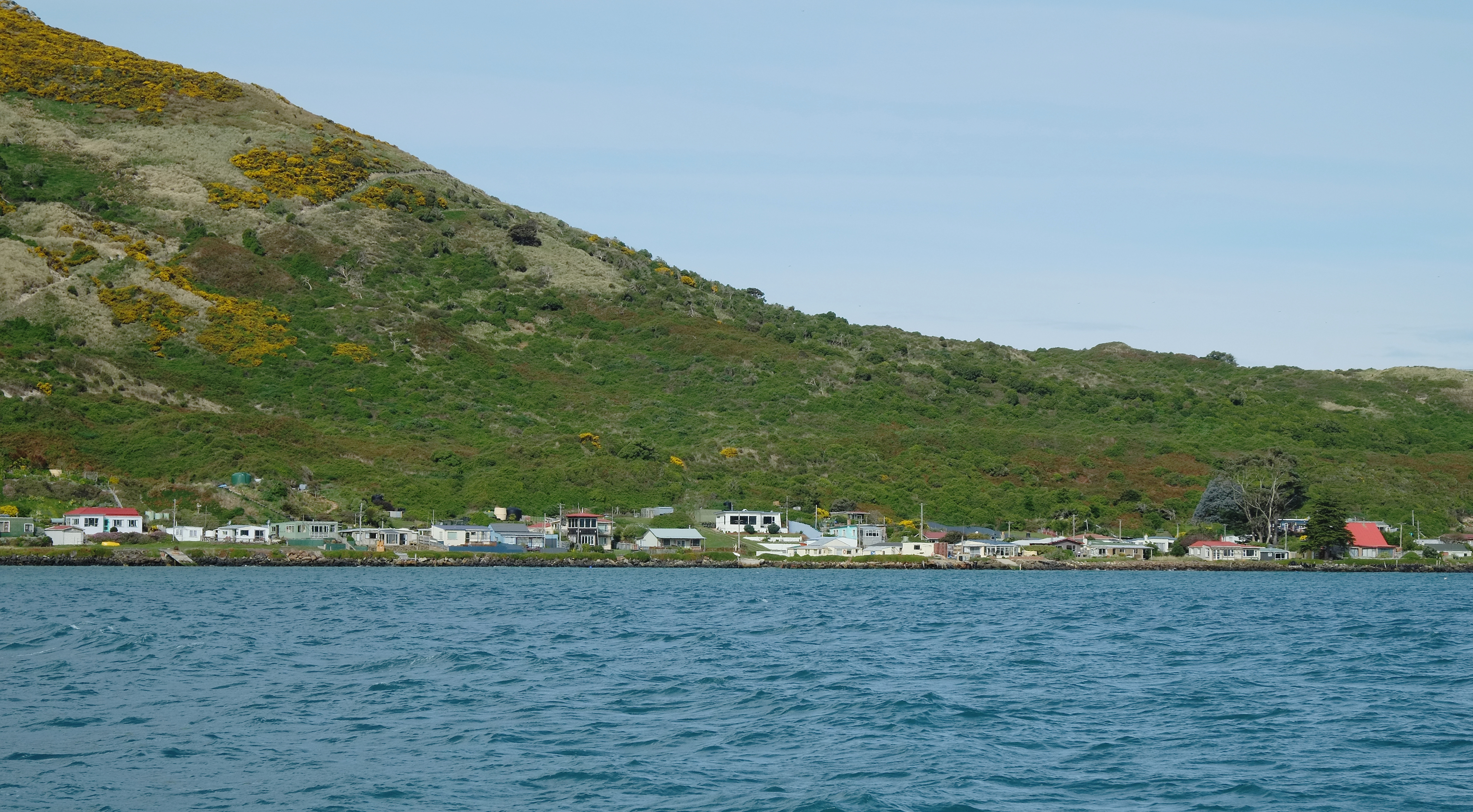
Houses at Harington Point

Harington Point is located between Taiaroa Head and Ōtākou, close to the entrance of Otago Harbour. The mouth of the harbour is at its narrowest at Harington Point, only some 400 metres (1,300 ft) separating the point from the mudflats at Aramoana on the opposing coast.

Te Rauone Beach is historically known for its many sand dunes, which have been restored after they were eroded. Restoration was a collaborative effort and there are new amenities.

The settlement can be reached by a 45-minute drive from Dunedin City on sealed roads, and is serviced 7 days per week by a regular bus service that takes 60 minutes from the city center, as well as a school bus. Despite its small size, Harington Point offers accommodation ranging from holiday houses to self-contained motel units.

== Wildlife ==
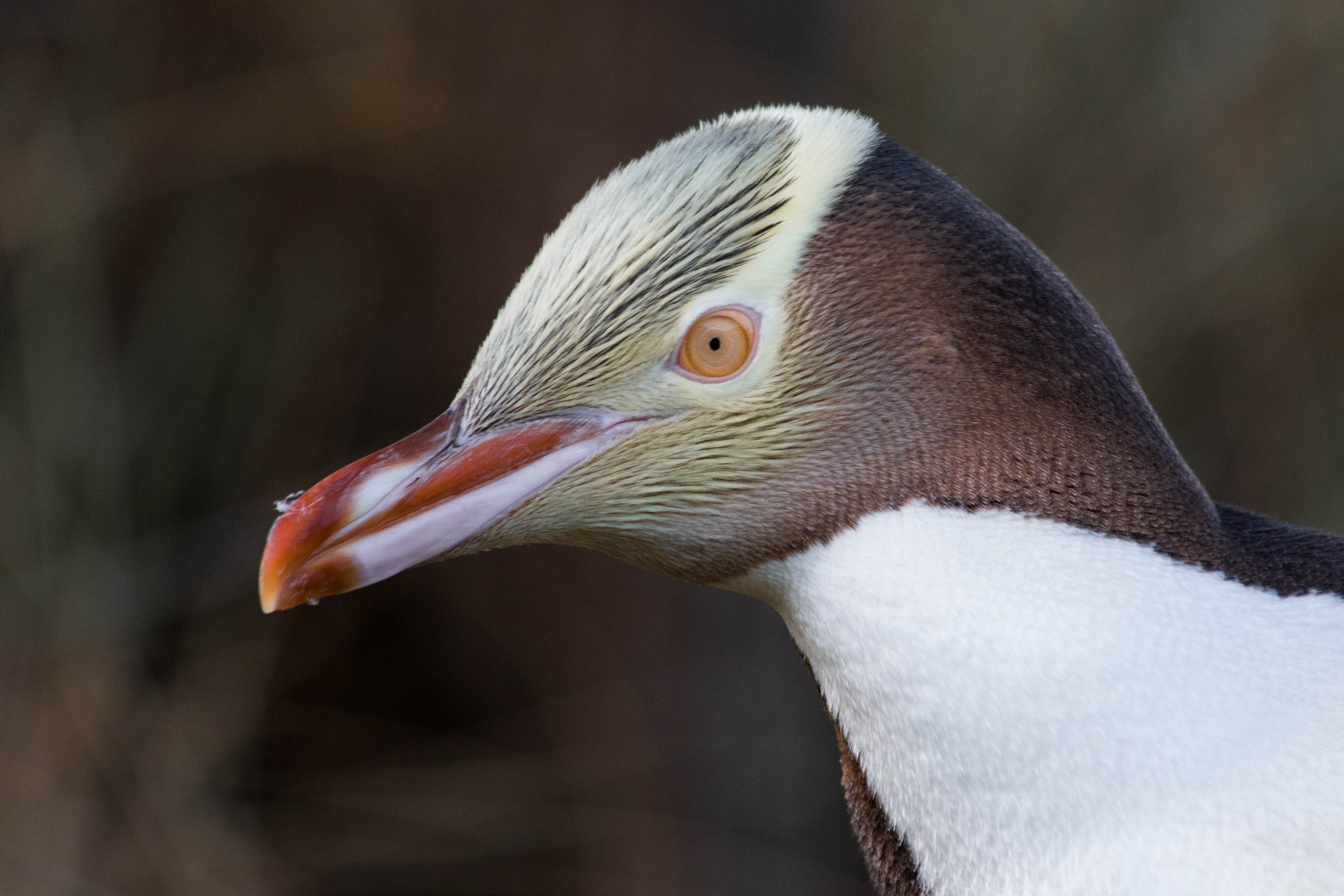
A yellow-eyed penguin at the Penguin Place

The settlement of Harington Point is the closest residential area to Taiaroa Head, the only mainland northern royal albatross colony in the world, as well as several other regionally important wildlife colonies. Between Harington Point and Taiaroa Head is Pilot's Beach, where little blue penguins are seen returning to nest at dusk. Over the hills southwest of Harington Point is the Otago Penguin Eco Restoration Alliance (OPERA), a nesting colony of yellow-eyed penguins. There are public tours of the three colonies. Wellers Rock wharf, just south of Harington Point, is the base for boat cruises and tours exploring the sea and bird life in the area.

The harbour's waters were a historic habitat for cetaceans, especially southern right whales (Tohorā), but the whales became an infrequent sight due to the destructions of their populations and migratory patterns, after the area became a major inshore whaling ground.

== Demographics ==
Statistics New Zealand describes Otakou and Harington Point as a rural settlement which covers 5.65 km^{2} (2.18 sq mi), and is part of the much larger Otago Peninsula statistical area.

== Historic sites ==
=== Wellers Rock ===
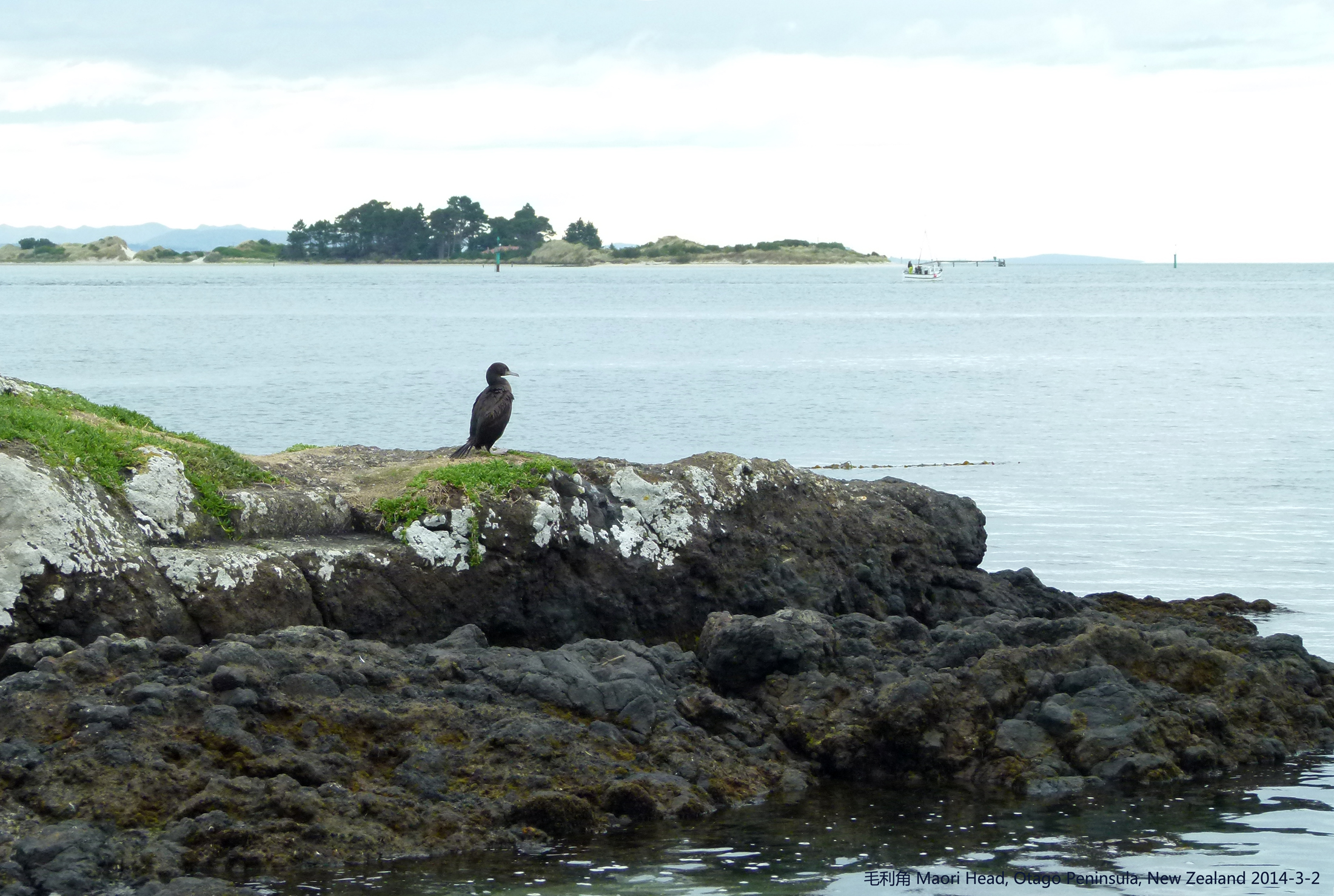
Weller's Rock (Te Umukuri)

Wellers Rock (officially spelt without a concluding apostrophe), also known as Te Umukuri or Te Umu Kuri, is located between Harington Point and Ōtākou at 45°47′52″S 170°42′54″E. It is named in honour of the Weller brothers, a family of whalers who formed one of the first permanent European settlements in the southern South Island. The Wellers operated three stations within the Otago Harbour, including two along Harington Point (Ōtākou and Te Rauone Beach), and the Ōtākou station was among the most significant and the largest shore whaling stations in New Zealand at the time. It began major operation in 1831, but faced a termination a decade later due to the sharp decline of whale numbers. An archaeological excavation of part of the site was carried out by the University of Otago in 1991. To this day, whale bones may be found near the rock.

In January 2020 Te Rūnanga o Ōtākou, Dunedin City Council, and the Department of Conservation joined forces in a project to protect the site from degradation.

As the final stage of the Te Rauone Beach restoration, a whale-tail sculpture Toru, a monument to both the history of the harbour and returning whales, was placed on the beach in 2023.

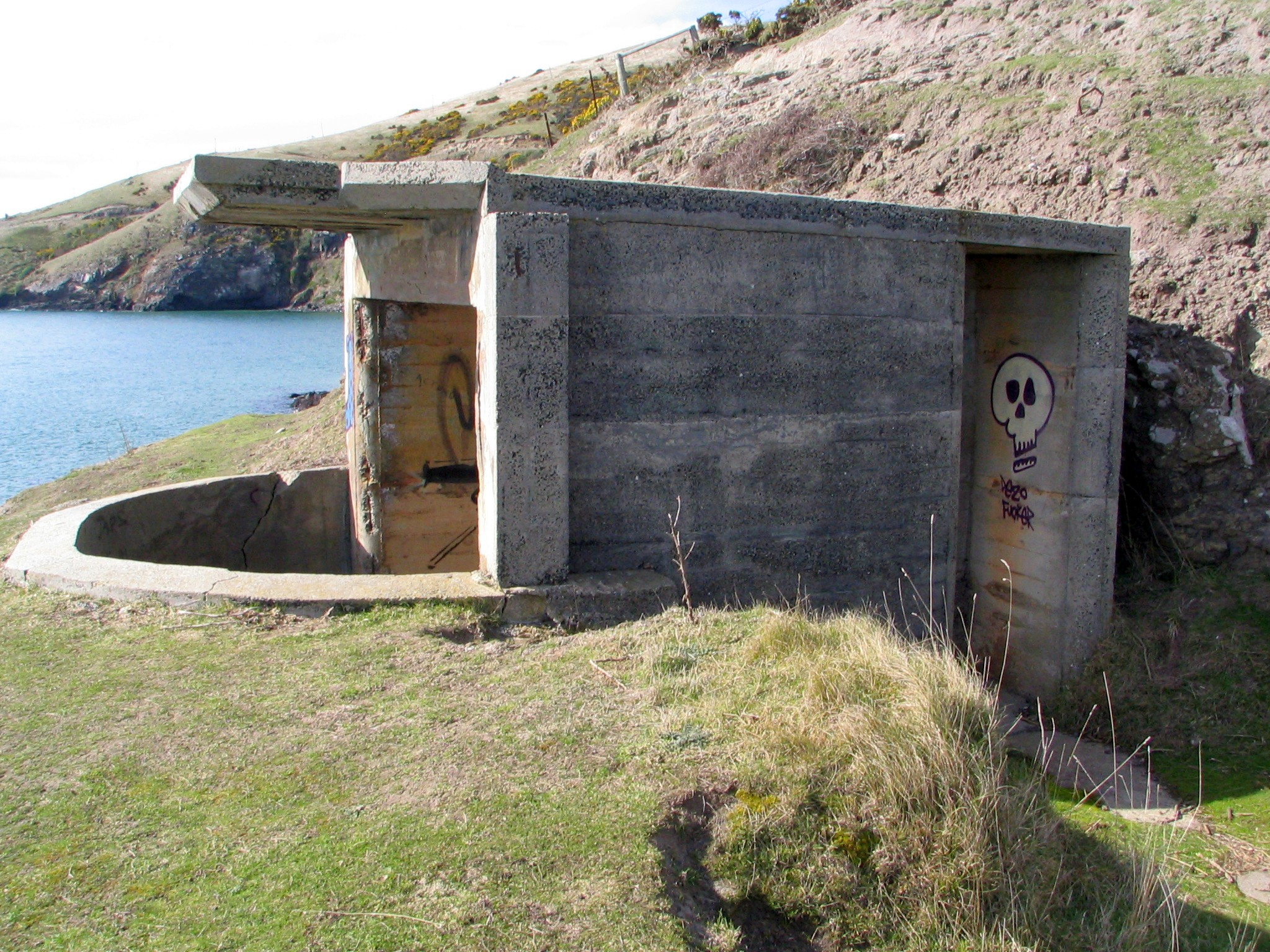
Harington Point gun emplacement

=== Gun emplacements ===
The hills behind Harington Point, along with the Taiaroa Head fort, contain several World War II gun emplacements, a subterranean communications tunnel and bunker, which were all part of the coastal fortifications of New Zealand. The original constructions were done in 1890s by using prisoners, as a precaution against the Russian Empire's advance.
