= Ōtākou =

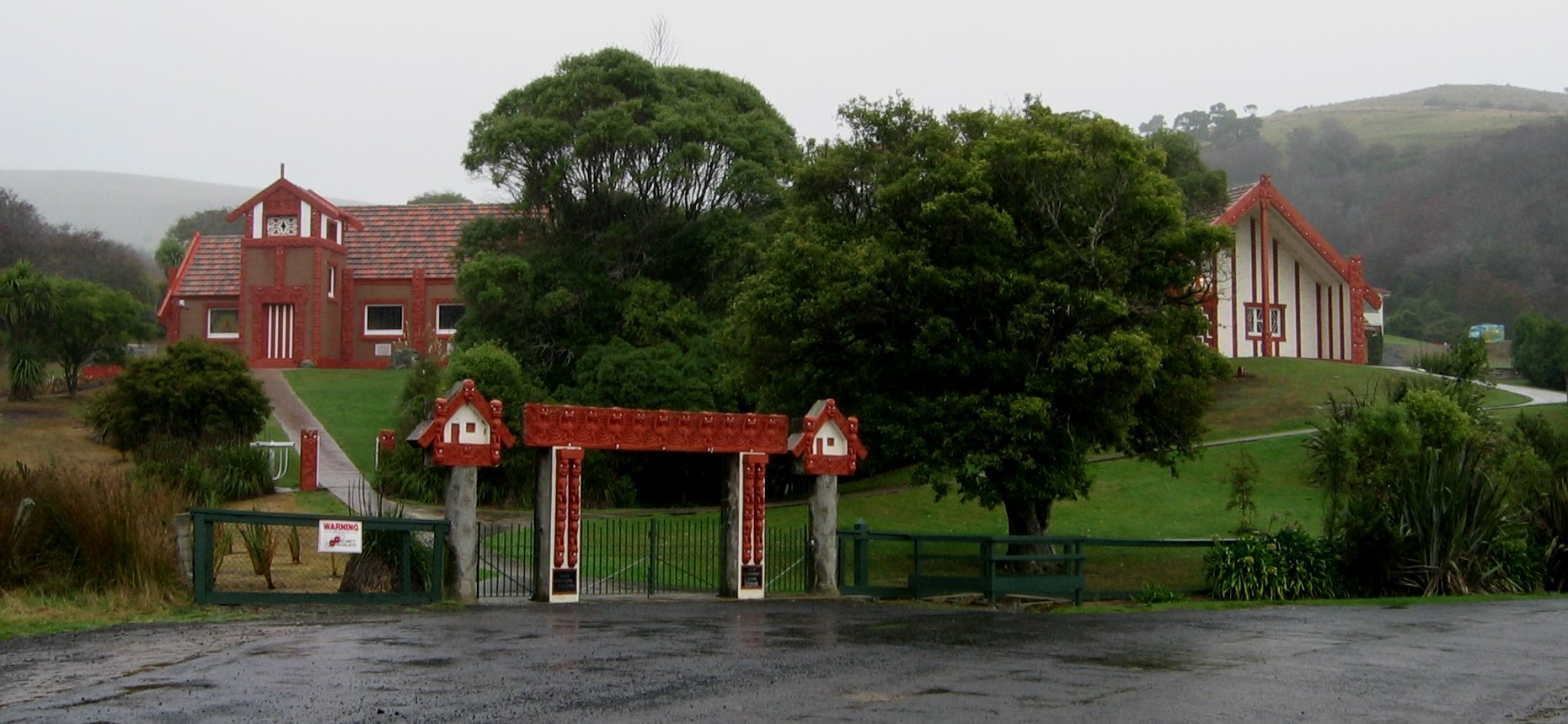
- Ōtākou Marae
- Interactive map of Ōtākou
- Coordinates: 45°48′15″S 170°42′00″E
- Country: New Zealand
- Region: Otago
- Territorial authority: Dunedin
- Community board: Otago Peninsula Community Board
- Electorates: Dunedin; Te Tai Tonga (Māori)

Government
  - Territorial authority: Dunedin City Council
  - Regional council: Otago Regional Council
  - Mayor of Dunedin: Sophie Barker
  - Dunedin MP: Rachel Brooking
  - Te Tai Tonga MP: Mananui Ramsden

Area
  - Total: 5.65 km^{2} (2.18 sq mi)

Population (June 2025)
  - Total: 190
  - Density: 34/km^{2} (87/sq mi)
- Time zone: UTC+12 (NZST)
  - Summer (DST): UTC+13 (NZDT)
- Local iwi: Ngāi Tahu

Ōtākou ([ɔːˈtaːkou]) is a settlement within the boundaries of the city of Dunedin, New Zealand. It is located 25 kilometres from the city centre at the eastern end of Otago Peninsula, close to the entrance of Otago Harbour. Though a small fishing village, Ōtākou is important in the history of Otago for several reasons. The settlement is the modern centre and traditional home of the Ōtākou rūnanga (assembly) of Ngāi Tahu. In 1946 Otakou Fisheries was founded in the township; this was later to become a major part of the Otago fishing industry.

== Toponymy ==
Prior to 1844, the name was written "Otago", which is an accurate phonetic transcription of its pronunciation in the local southern Māori dialect. The early missionaries first transcribed the northern North Island dialect and that became standard written Māori; the name for this place was never written as "Otakou" until Europeans who had learnt Māori in the north, such as Edward Shortland and George Clarke, came here in the mid-1840s. The name "Otago", adopted as the name for the wider Otago region, is commonly mistaken as a European corruption of "Ōtākou".

The name originally referred to the channel that runs along the eastern (or southern) side of the Otago Harbour past present-day Ōtākou. According to the Ngāi Tahu atlas Kā Huru Manu: "Ōtākou is the channel that runs down the eastern (southern) side of the Otago Harbour from the mouth to Harwood Point. Aramoana is the channel that runs down the western (northern) side through to Kōpūtai (Port Chalmers)." In the 1820s the string of Māori settlements running from Harington Point south and south-west up the harbour were named Te Ruatitiko, Tahakopa (just north of Te Umukurī or Wellers Rock), Omate, and Ohinemu. Omate was approximately on the low-lying land between Otakou Marae and the harbour. The name "Otago" became applied to the anchorage off Wellers Rock, to the Weller brothers' whaling station, which had been founded in 1831, and to the lower harbour generally.

According to Kāti Māmoe, who lived in the South Island prior to Ngāi Tahu, the name refers to an ancient Kāti Māmoe chief named Tākou, who some said came to New Zealand from Hawaiki.

A. W. Reed's dictionaries of place names suggested that the tākou in Ōtākou was a reference to red ochre, but that is invented. "Tākou" is a North Island name for red ochre that Ngāi Tahu did not use; they called red ochre "maukoroa".

== History ==
Prior to the arrival of European settlers, the place was a prominent Māori settlement, and it is still the site of Otago's most important marae (meeting ground). By the early 19th century, the three Māori iwi of Ngāi Tahu, Kāti Māmoe and Waitaha had blended into a single tribal entity. The Treaty of Waitangi was signed nearby in 1840 on HMS Herald by two important chiefs, Hone Karetai and Kōrako, who were descended from all three tribes.

In December 1817 the Sophia, a Hobart sealing ship captained by James Kelly, anchored in the waters of the harbour near Ōtākou. A small group of men, including Captain Kelly, took a rowing boat around Heyward Point to visit Whareakeake, then the site of a Māori kāinga (village), where one of the men, William Tucker, had a house and a business selling hei-tiki. For reasons that remain speculative, the encounter turned violent and three of Kelly's men, including Tucker, were killed. The survivors rowed back to the Sophia but, according to Kelly's account of the event, found her boarded by Māori from Ōtākou and retook her in a bloody fight. Historians caution that Kelly's account, made to justify the actions he took, exaggerates the danger he and his men were in. Kelly destroyed multiple canoes and set fire to "the beautiful city of Otago", which was almost certainly Ōtākou, although the kāinga at Whareakeake was also burned and abandoned around this time, which some historians believe to have been Kelly's doing. This incident is treated as an episode in the ongoing state of lawless conflict known as the Sealers' War.

== Present use ==
Ōtākou remains an important centre of Ngāi Tahu life, as the location of Ōtākou Marae. It is a marae of Ngāi Tahu and the branch of Ōtākou Rūnaka, and includes the Tamatea wharenui (meeting house).

Ōtākou is located close to Taiaroa Head, the site of an albatross colony and other wildlife such as seals and penguins. Local Māori still call Taiaroa Head by its original name, Pukekura, which was also the name of the pā (fortification) established there around 1750 and still occupied by Māori in the 1840s, before the land was taken by the Government under the Public Works Act for building the lighthouse and the fortifications used during the Russian Scare of the 1880s.

== Demographics ==
Statistics New Zealand describes Ōtākou-Harington Point as a rural settlement which covers 5.65 km^{2} (2.18 sq mi), and had an estimated population of 190 as of June 2025, with a population density of 34 people per km^{2}. It is part of the much larger Otago Peninsula statistical area.

Historical population
Year	Pop.	±% p.a.
2006	171	—
2013	162	−0.77%
2018	192	+3.46%

Ōtākou-Harington Point had a population of 192 at the 2018 New Zealand census, an increase of 30 people (18.5%) since the 2013 census, and an increase of 21 people (12.3%) since the 2006 census. There were 102 households, comprising 99 males and 90 females, giving a sex ratio of 1.1 males per female. The median age was 57.8 years (compared with 37.4 years nationally), with 18 people (9.4%) aged under 15 years, 18 (9.4%) aged 15 to 29, 93 (48.4%) aged 30 to 64, and 60 (31.2%) aged 65 or older.

Ethnicities were 81.2% European/Pākehā, 32.8% Māori, 3.1% Pasifika, 3.1% Asian, and 1.6% other ethnicities. People may identify with more than one ethnicity.

Although some people chose not to answer the census's question about religious affiliation, 59.4% had no religion, 31.2% were Christian and 4.7% had other religions.

Of those at least 15 years old, 30 (17.2%) people had a bachelor's or higher degree, and 30 (17.2%) people had no formal qualifications. The median income was $19,200, compared with $31,800 nationally. 12 people (6.9%) earned over $70,000 compared to 17.2% nationally. The employment status of those at least 15 was that 48 (27.6%) people were employed full-time, 36 (20.7%) were part-time, and 9 (5.2%) were unemployed.
