= Pūerua River =

Coordinates: 46°23′S 169°47′E

Location
- Country: New Zealand

The Pūerua River, prior to 2018 spelled Puerua River, is a river in South Otago, New Zealand. A tributary of the Clutha River / Mata-Au, it rises east of Brown Dome and flows eastward to join that river near Port Molyneux.

== See also ==
- List of rivers of New Zealand
