= Nugget Point =

Steep landform in Otago, New Zealand

Coordinates: 46°26′52″S 169°48′55″E

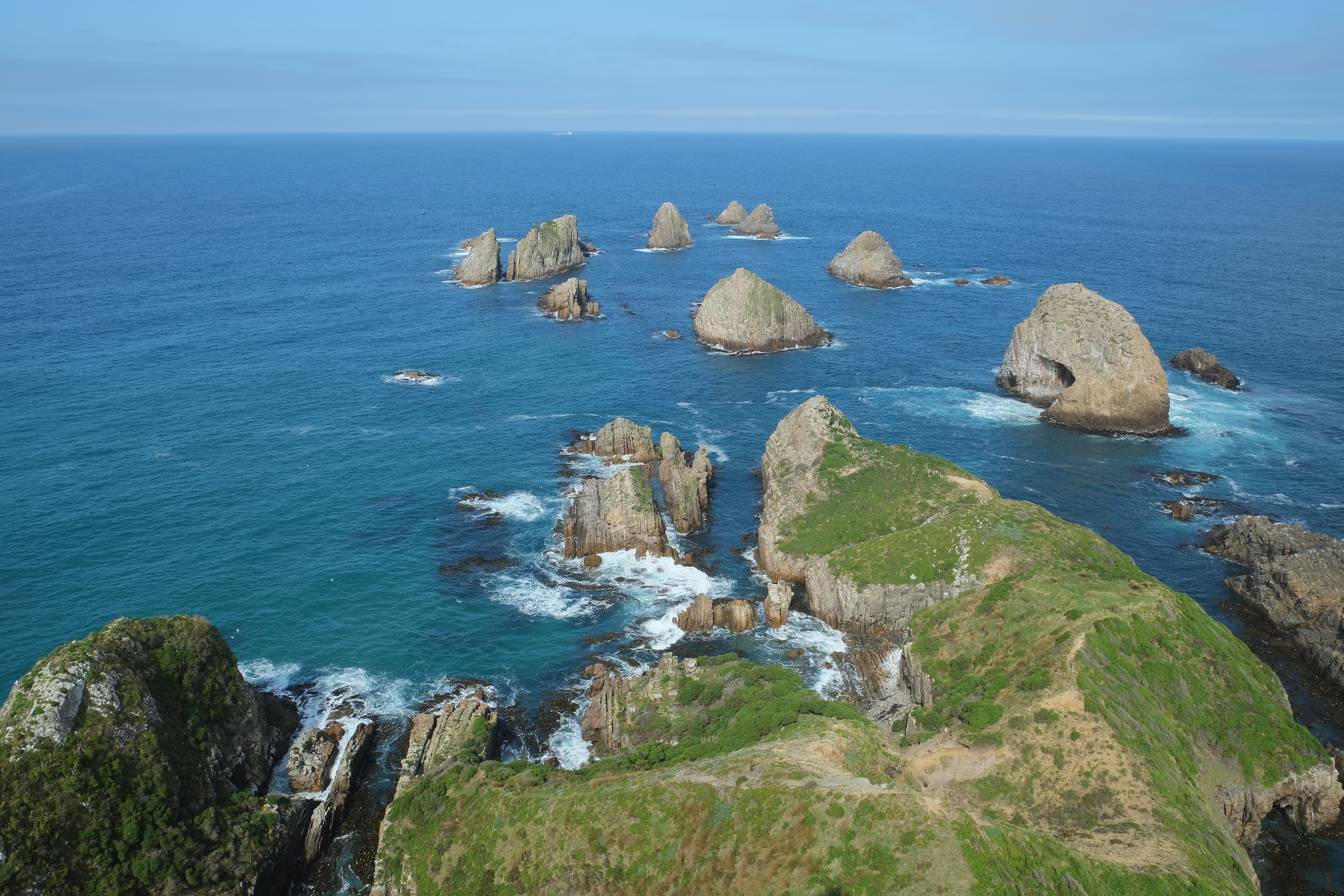
Looking down at Nugget Point and The Nuggets from viewing platform next to the lighthouse.

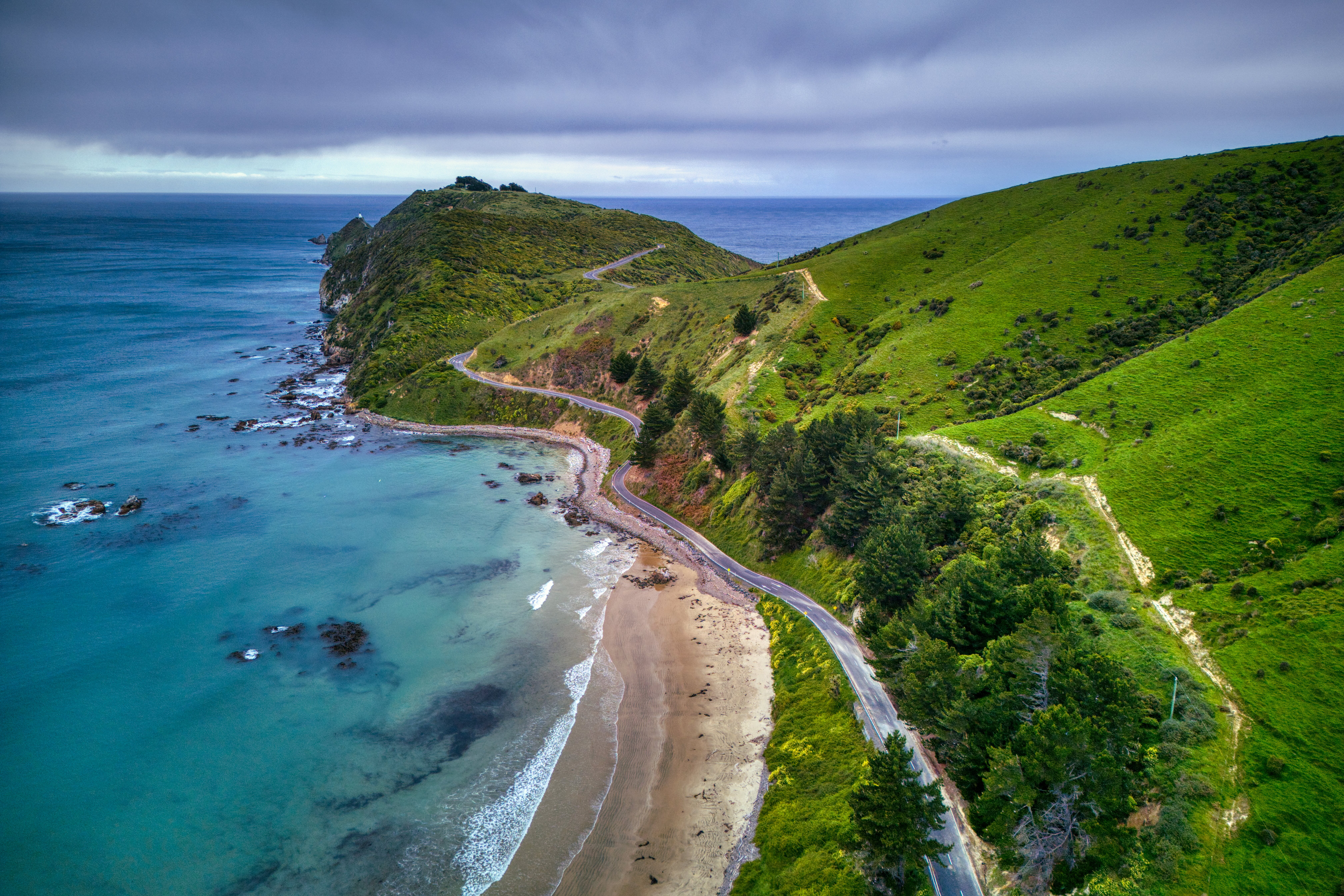
Nugget Point area

Nugget Point (Māori: Tokatā) is a coastal landform on the Otago coast in New Zealand at the northern end of the Catlins coast, along the road from Kaka Point. This steep headland has a lighthouse at its tip, surrounded by rocky islets (The Nuggets). The point is home to many seabirds, including penguins, gannets, royal spoonbills, and a breeding colony of fur seals. Roaring Bay, on the south coast of the tip of Nugget Point, is home to a small colony of yellow-eyed penguins.

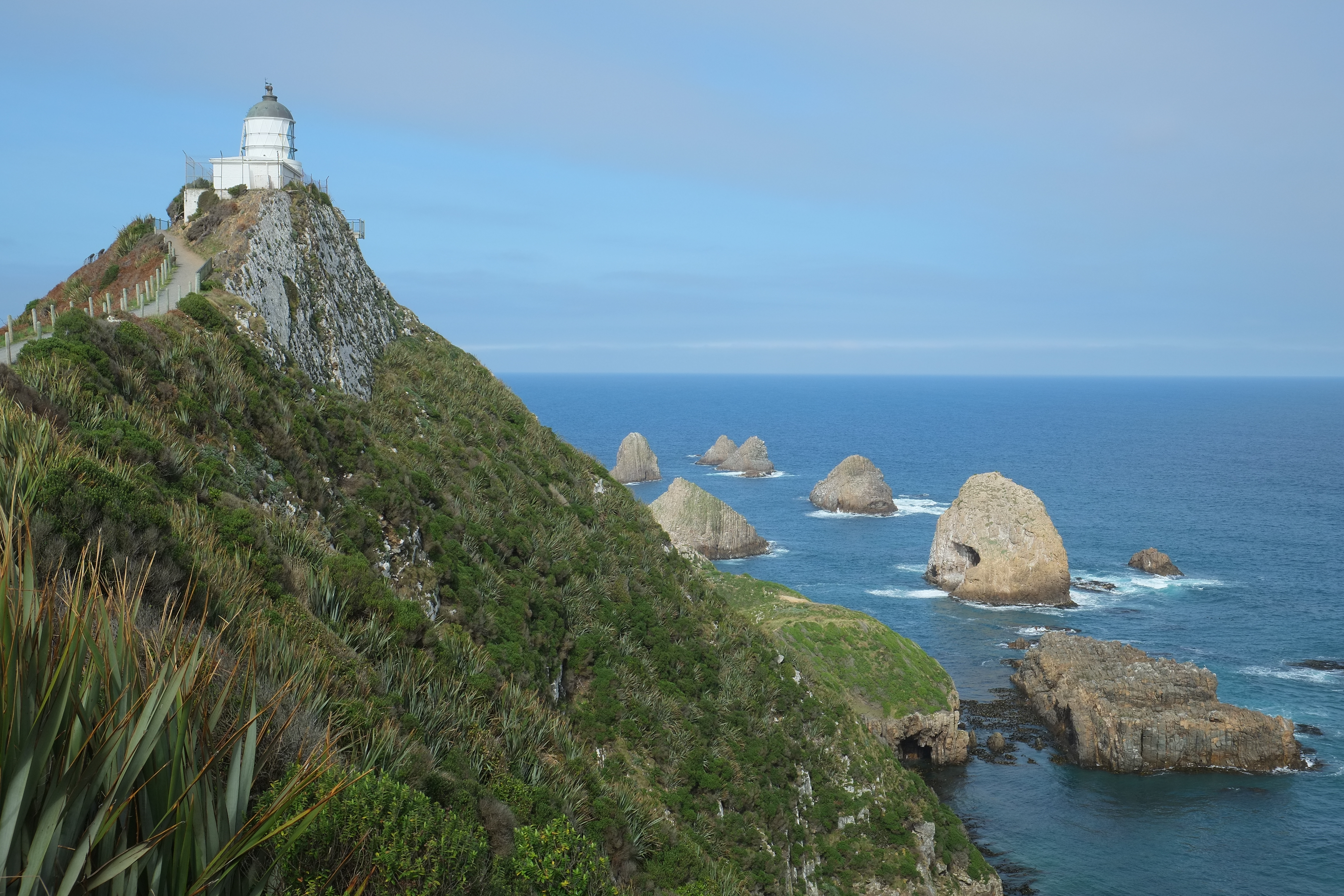
View along path towards Nugget Point lighthouse. Rocky islets (The Nuggets) can be seen beyond the lighthouse.

== Nugget Point Lighthouse ==
Nugget Point had been considered a significant danger in particular to small vessels trading along the coast to the Clutha River. The lighthouse was built in 1869 and started operating on 4 July 1870. The tower was constructed from locally quarried stone and stands 76 metres (249 ft) above the water. Originally powered by an oil burner, it was converted to a 1,000 W lamp in 1949 with electricity provided by a diesel generator until the 1960s, when the lighthouse was connected to mains electricity. It was automated in 1989 and is computer-monitored and operated by Maritime New Zealand.

== Proposed marine reserve ==
Although the headland itself is a 47 hectares (120 acres) scientific reserve, the marine area around it currently has no special protection. While a marine reserve has been proposed twice by the New Zealand Department of Conservation, this has proved controversial. Many of the small local communities, which still rely on fishing for their livelihood, have been a source of opposition to the proposed reserve. Fishing industry bodies such as the Seafood Industry Council have also argued against it. Meanwhile, many University of Otago scientists support a reserve. The initial proposal would have protected more coastline than the latest Department of Conservation proposal, which covers only about one third of the coastline that the Royal Forest and Bird Protection Society has proposed protecting, to less than one tenth the distance offshore.

== Tourism ==
Nugget Point is advertised as a side trip from the Southern Scenic Route, with the main attractions being two easy 20-minute return walks, one to the viewing platform next to the lighthouse, the other to Roaring Bay.

The closest village is Kaka Point, which has traveller accommodation. The Nuggets Road is sealed for its entirety and climbs the bluff towards two car parks at Nugget Point. The walk to Roaring Bay starts at the lower car park and leads to a bird hide. Yellow-eyed penguins may be observed here, as well as fur seals and sometimes sea lions and elephant seals (one of few places in the nation with regular occurrences of this species). Cetaceans such as migrating southern right whales and humpback whales, orca, and dolphins such as endemic Hector's dolphins can be seen from the shore.

== Climate ==
Climate data for Nugget Point (1991–2020 normals, extremes 1970–present)
| Month | Jan | Feb | Mar | Apr | May | Jun | Jul | Aug | Sep | Oct | Nov | Dec | Year |
|---|---|---|---|---|---|---|---|---|---|---|---|---|---|
| Record high °C (°F) | 34.2 (93.6) | 33.0 (91.4) | 28.6 (83.5) | 25.0 (77.0) | 22.2 (72.0) | 18.9 (66.0) | 17.2 (63.0) | 19.9 (67.8) | 24.7 (76.5) | 26.2 (79.2) | 27.9 (82.2) | 30.7 (87.3) | 34.2 (93.6) |
| Mean maximum °C (°F) | 26.6 (79.9) | 25.6 (78.1) | 23.3 (73.9) | 20.3 (68.5) | 17.4 (63.3) | 14.8 (58.6) | 14.4 (57.9) | 15.9 (60.6) | 18.7 (65.7) | 21.5 (70.7) | 23.2 (73.8) | 24.4 (75.9) | 27.8 (82.0) |
| Mean daily maximum °C (°F) | 18.0 (64.4) | 17.7 (63.9) | 16.3 (61.3) | 14.0 (57.2) | 11.7 (53.1) | 9.5 (49.1) | 9.0 (48.2) | 10.1 (50.2) | 11.9 (53.4) | 13.4 (56.1) | 14.8 (58.6) | 16.7 (62.1) | 13.6 (56.5) |
| Daily mean °C (°F) | 14.1 (57.4) | 14.0 (57.2) | 12.8 (55.0) | 10.9 (51.6) | 8.9 (48.0) | 6.8 (44.2) | 6.3 (43.3) | 7.2 (45.0) | 8.6 (47.5) | 9.9 (49.8) | 11.1 (52.0) | 13.0 (55.4) | 10.3 (50.5) |
| Mean daily minimum °C (°F) | 10.2 (50.4) | 10.4 (50.7) | 9.3 (48.7) | 7.8 (46.0) | 6.1 (43.0) | 4.2 (39.6) | 3.6 (38.5) | 4.3 (39.7) | 5.3 (41.5) | 6.3 (43.3) | 7.4 (45.3) | 9.2 (48.6) | 7.0 (44.6) |
| Mean minimum °C (°F) | 5.9 (42.6) | 6.4 (43.5) | 5.4 (41.7) | 3.4 (38.1) | 1.5 (34.7) | 0.4 (32.7) | −0.6 (30.9) | 0.4 (32.7) | 1.2 (34.2) | 2.0 (35.6) | 3.0 (37.4) | 5.2 (41.4) | −0.9 (30.4) |
| Record low °C (°F) | 3.0 (37.4) | 3.6 (38.5) | 1.6 (34.9) | 1.0 (33.8) | −1.9 (28.6) | −1.5 (29.3) | −1.9 (28.6) | −5.0 (23.0) | −1.4 (29.5) | −0.8 (30.6) | −1.7 (28.9) | 2.0 (35.6) | −5.0 (23.0) |
| Average rainfall mm (inches) | 73.1 (2.88) | 65.4 (2.57) | 54.9 (2.16) | 55.0 (2.17) | 78.9 (3.11) | 80.4 (3.17) | 58.7 (2.31) | 48.6 (1.91) | 54.5 (2.15) | 70.2 (2.76) | 75.9 (2.99) | 69.3 (2.73) | 784.9 (30.91) |
Source: NIWA
