= Port Molyneux =

Settlement in South Otago, New Zealand

Coordinates: 46°21′40″S 169°46′40″E

Port Molyneux is a tiny settlement on the coast of South Otago, New Zealand, close to the north-easternmost point of The Catlins. Now home only to farmland, it was a thriving port in the early years of New Zealand's European settlement.

The settlement, located equidistant between Kaka Point and the current mouths of the Clutha River / Mata-Au, was originally located at the mouth of the Clutha / Mata-Au. It takes its name from Molyneux Harbour, named by Captain James Cook in 1774. In 1838 or 1839, it became the site of a whaling station, with the first permanent European settlers, George Willsher and Thomas Russell, arriving in 1840. The growth of settlement in the area largely started after the 1844 purchase of the Otago Block from local Māori.

The mining of coal at nearby Kaitangata from the 1850s and the discovery of gold inland at Gabriel's Gully (leading to the Otago gold rush of 1861–63) led to an increase of the necessity for shipping. Port Molyneux was an obvious destination, even though it was not a particularly good harbour, as it was located close to the regional hub of Balclutha, about 15 kilometres upriver. The town continued to thrive until events in the late 1870s which between them stripped it of its livelihood. First, a major flood in late 1878 carried silt down the Clutha / Mata-Au and changed the river's course. New outlets to the Pacific Ocean were created further up the coast (at its current mouth), and the outlet at Port Molyneux silted up, depriving the town of downriver traffic. Less than six months later, a second disaster for the town occurred, with an explosion at Kaitangata coal mine which killed 34 miners. Compounding these events, 1879 also saw the opening of a railway link from Balclutha to the provincial capital of Dunedin, making for easier transportation of goods and passengers to the city and its port.

Almost nothing remains of the town as it was. In its heyday, the town's main street, Pendennis Street (now Port Molyneux Road), led to a central octagon. The township's commercial businesses included two general stores, an ironmonger, a butcher, a painter, a bootmaker, hotels, a carpenter, harbour and customs offices, and a sawmill. There was also a police station and lock-up, a school, and a church. Today, all that remains of the town are one or two derelict buildings inland from an area of coastal swamp. The church was moved four kilometres south to become the church at Kaka Point.
