= Taiaroa Head =

New Zealand headland

Coordinates: 45°46′30″S 170°43′40″E

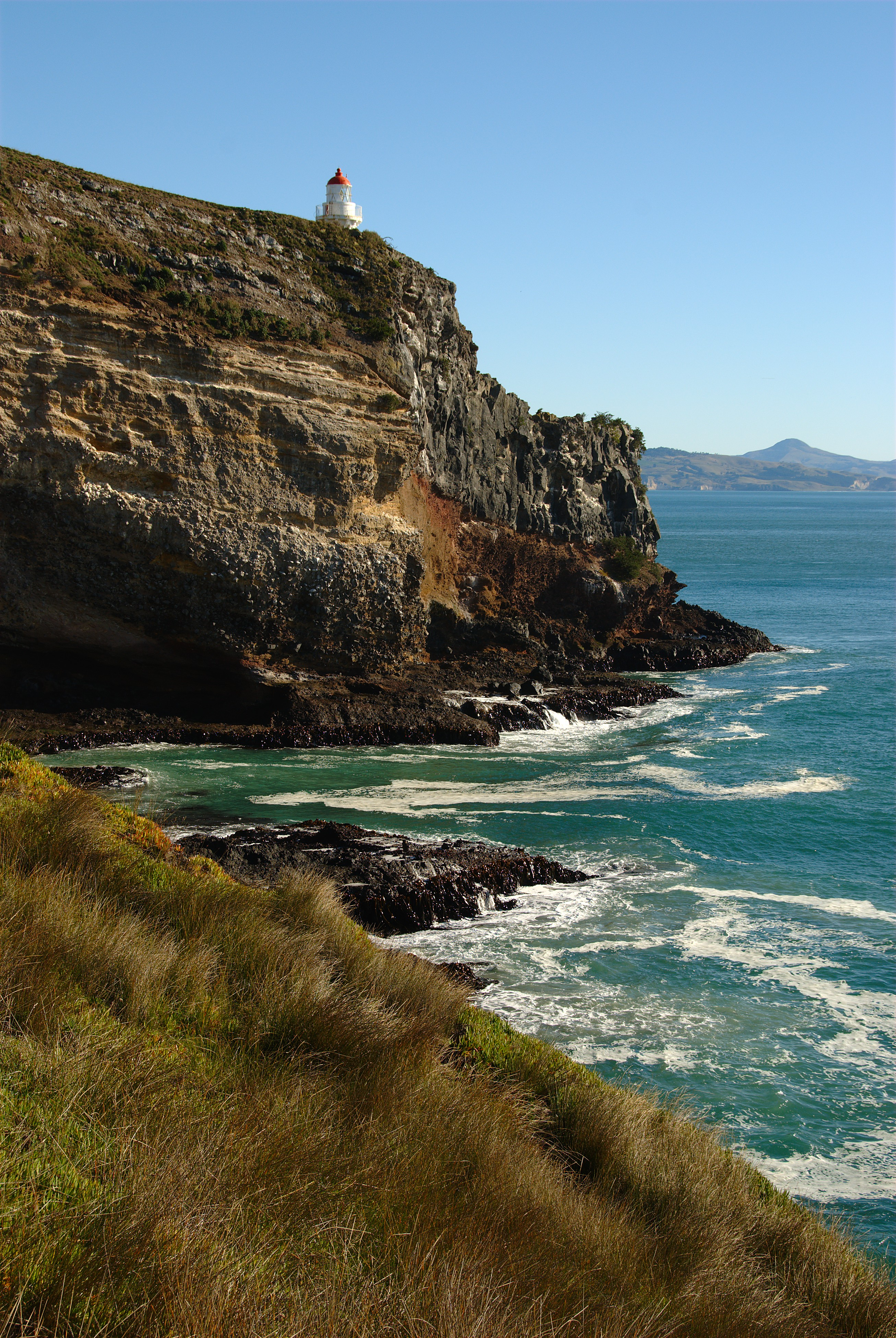
Taiaroa Head

Taiaroa Head is a headland at the end of the Otago Peninsula in New Zealand, overlooking the mouth of the Otago Harbour. It lies within the city limits of Dunedin. The nearest settlement, Ōtākou, is three kilometres south.

The cape is home to a lighthouse, built in 1864, and a colony of over 100 northern royal albatrosses, which established itself in 1919 – the only such colony on an inhabited mainland. There is also the Royal Albatross Centre.

== History ==
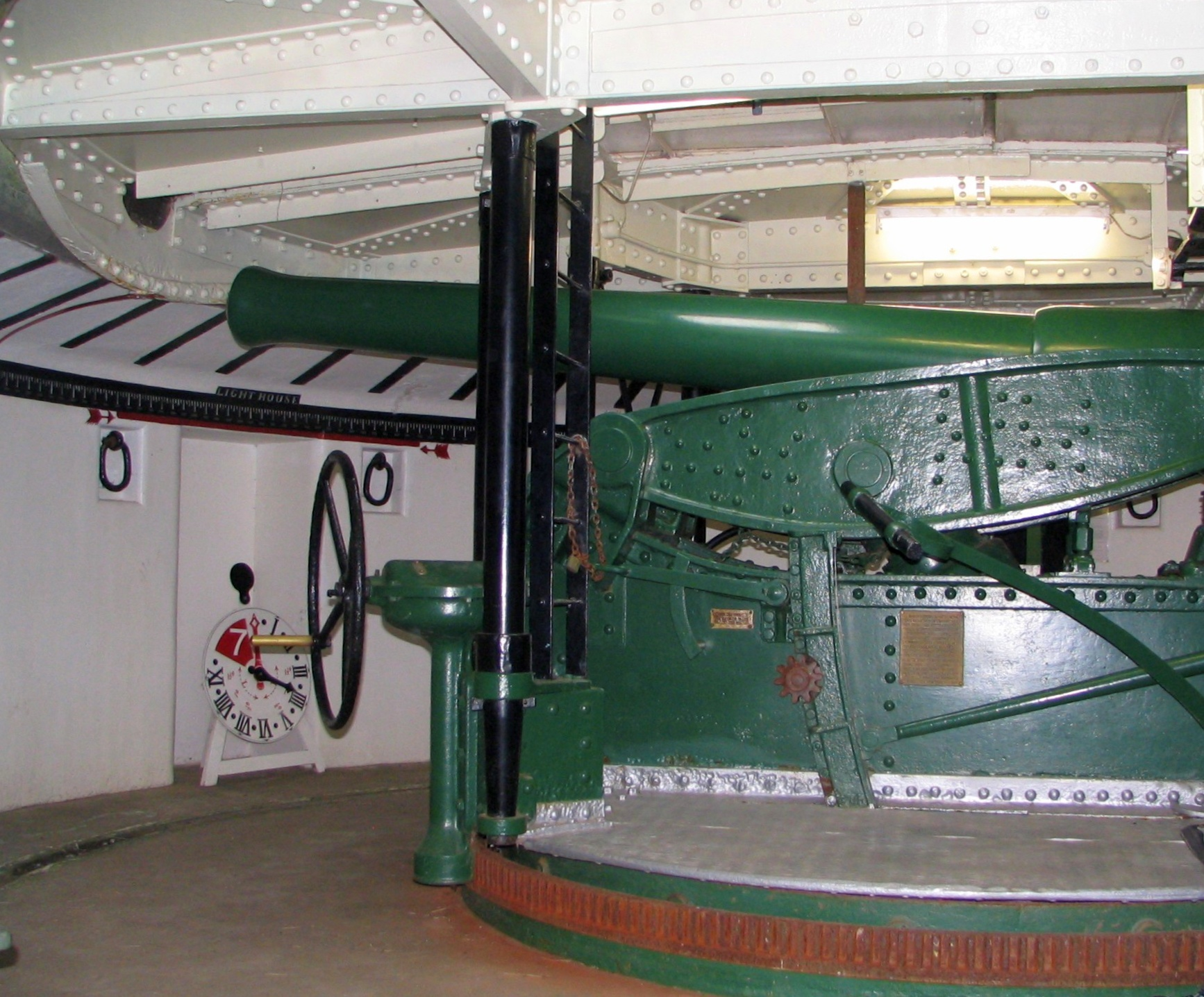
Armstrong RBL 6-inch disappearing gun at Taiaroa Head

The headland is named for Te Mātenga Taiaroa, a 19th-century Māori chief of the Ngāi Tahu iwi. Pukekura, a significant Māori pā was located on the headland, having been established about 1650 and still occupied by Māori in the 1840s. It is associated with a daring warrior called Tarewai who was active in the 18th century. Pilot's Beach was formerly known as 'Hobart Town Beach' from the whaling tryworks established there in 1836 by the Weller brothers employing men from Hobart. Previously it was called 'Measly Beach' from its being a place where Māori went to bathe when afflicted by a measles epidemic in 1835.

Historically, several commercial whaling stations established on the peninsula and the number of whales in this area were heavily exploited.

Ruins of former coastal defences are located nearby, notably a restored Armstrong disappearing gun emplacement built in 1886 following a scare that New Zealand might be invaded by the Russians.

== Wildlife ==
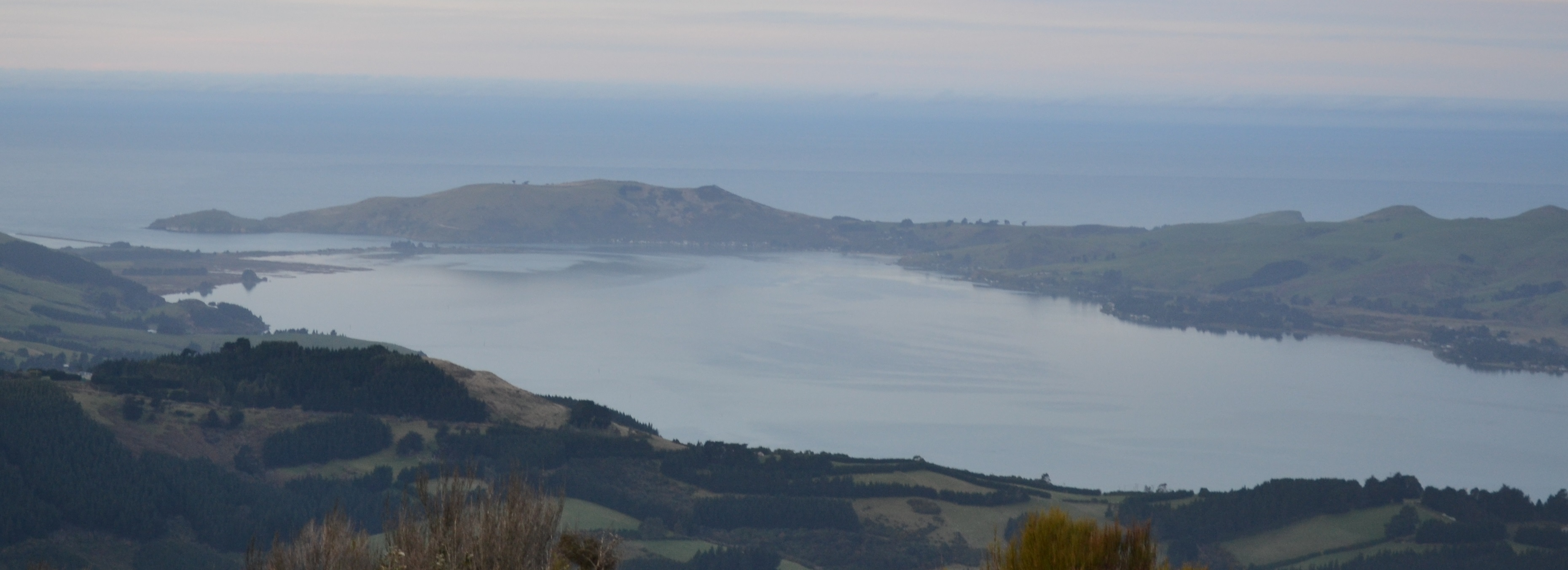
Otago Harbour and the north-east tip of the Otago Peninsula as seen from Buttar's Peak, near Mount Cargill

A small beach, Pilots Beach, is located just inside the harbour entrance to the south of the head, and many forms of marine life, such as New Zealand fur seals and Hooker's sea lions are often to be seen. At Pilots beach is the largest colony of little or blue penguins remaining on the Otago Peninsula. Nearby are important breeding habitats of the threatened yellow-eyed penguin.

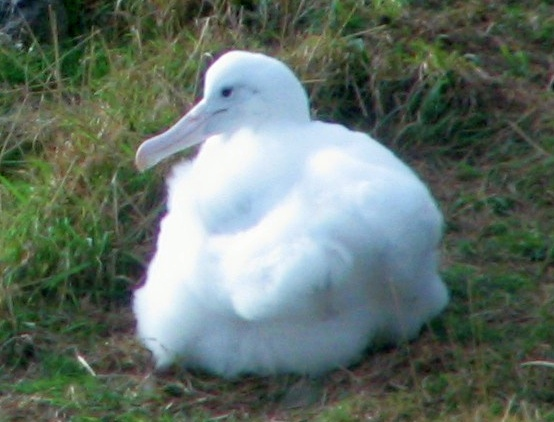
Northern royal albatross chick at Taiaroa Head

There may also be seen a number of dusky dolphins, orcas and migratory large whales such as southern rights and humpbacks. Their sightings in these areas are on the increase and Taiaroa Head may be one of the best vantage points along the Otago coast. The part of Taiaroa Head where northern royal albatrosses breed is managed by the NZ Department of Conservation as a nature reserve with restricted entry. On adjacent land the Otago Peninsula Trust manage a visitor centre and run guided tours into the Nature Reserve. Pilots Beach is managed as a recreation reserve by the Dunedin City.

=== Royal albatross colony ===
The first albatross egg at the head was discovered in 1919, although it was not until 1938 that ornithologist Dr Lance Richdale saw the first live fledging. Since they first successfully raised a chick at Taiaroa Head, royal albatross numbers have increased due to intensive management by reserve rangers. As time has progressed intensive wildlife husbandry methods such as supplementary feeding and chick fostering have been developed and refined. The one important difference has been that both the adults and progeny are not held in captivity but in the wild and in the case of the adults leave the colony each day while raising chicks to gather food. Intensive methods include predator control for cats, ferrets, stoats and weasels. Also in the early 1990s a new blowfly arrived and caused the death of a number of chicks by laying eggs in them while the chick was still attempting to hatch. Removing eggs from young or inexperienced parents has also occurred with these eggs being hatched in brooders.

== Climate ==
Climate data for Taiaroa Head (1991–2020 normals, extremes 1966–2002)
Month	Jan	Feb	Mar	Apr	May	Jun	Jul	Aug	Sep	Oct	Nov	Dec	Year
Record high °C (°F)	29.5 (85.1)	31.0 (87.8)	29.5 (85.1)	25.0 (77.0)	23.0 (73.4)	19.5 (67.1)	19.0 (66.2)	19.3 (66.7)	24.5 (76.1)	28.3 (82.9)	27.3 (81.1)	31.0 (87.8)	31.0 (87.8)
Mean daily maximum °C (°F)	17.3 (63.1)	17.2 (63.0)	16.2 (61.2)	14.3 (57.7)	12.4 (54.3)	10.5 (50.9)	9.7 (49.5)	10.5 (50.9)	11.9 (53.4)	13.2 (55.8)	14.7 (58.5)	15.9 (60.6)	13.7 (56.6)
Daily mean °C (°F)	14.2 (57.6)	14.2 (57.6)	13.3 (55.9)	11.6 (52.9)	9.8 (49.6)	7.9 (46.2)	7.2 (45.0)	7.8 (46.0)	9.0 (48.2)	10.1 (50.2)	11.5 (52.7)	12.9 (55.2)	10.8 (51.4)
Mean daily minimum °C (°F)	11.1 (52.0)	11.2 (52.2)	10.3 (50.5)	8.8 (47.8)	7.1 (44.8)	5.3 (41.5)	4.7 (40.5)	5.1 (41.2)	6.1 (43.0)	7.1 (44.8)	8.3 (46.9)	9.9 (49.8)	7.9 (46.3)
Record low °C (°F)	1.0 (33.8)	2.8 (37.0)	0.6 (33.1)	−1.0 (30.2)	−1.1 (30.0)	−0.9 (30.4)	−1.4 (29.5)	−2.9 (26.8)	−2.5 (27.5)	0.0 (32.0)	0.2 (32.4)	−1.3 (29.7)	−2.9 (26.8)
Average rainfall mm (inches)	67.7 (2.67)	51.3 (2.02)	45.4 (1.79)	42.0 (1.65)	31.4 (1.24)	46.9 (1.85)	36.8 (1.45)	45.9 (1.81)	45.2 (1.78)	48.6 (1.91)	61.3 (2.41)	59.4 (2.34)	581.9 (22.92)
Source: NIWA
