= Otago =

Region of New Zealand

Coordinates: 45°52′50″S 170°29′46″E

Otago Ōtākou (Māori)
- Region
- Flag

- Otago within New Zealand
- Country: New Zealand
- Island: South Island
- Established: 1848 (Dunedin settlement); 1852 (Otago Province)
- Seat: Dunedin
- Territorial authorities: List: Queenstown-Lakes District; Central Otago District; Dunedin City; Clutha District; Waitaki District (40.39%)

Government
  - Body: Otago Regional Council
  - Chair: Hilary Calvert
  - Deputy Chair: Kevin Malcolm

Area
  - Region: 31,251 km^{2} (12,066 sq mi)
  - Land: 31,186.16 km^{2} (12,041.04 sq mi)

Population (June 2025)
  - Region: 253,900
  - Density: 8.141/km^{2} (21.09/sq mi)

GDP
  - Total: NZ$15.336 billion (2021) (6th)
  - Per capita: NZ$62,518 (2021)
- Time zone: UTC+12:00 (NZST)
  - Summer (DST): UTC+13:00 (NZDT)
- HDI (2023): 0.935 very high · 6th
- Website: www.orc.govt.nz

Otago (Note: /əˈtɑːɡoʊ/, /oʊ-, ɒ-/; Māori: Ōtākou [ɔːˈtaːkou]) is a region of New Zealand located in the southern half of the South Island and administered by the Otago Regional Council. It has an area of approximately 32,000 square kilometres (12,000 sq mi), making it the country's second largest local government region. Its population was 253,900 in June 2025.

The name Otago is the local southern Māori dialect pronunciation of "Ōtākou", the name of the Māori village near the entrance to Otago Harbour. The exact meaning of the term is disputed, with common translations being 'isolated village' and 'place of red earth', the latter referring to the reddish-ochre clay that is common in the area around Dunedin. Otago is also the old name of the European settlement on the harbour, established by the Weller Brothers in 1831, which lies close to Ōtākou. The upper harbour later became the focus of the Otago Association, an offshoot of the Free Church of Scotland, notable for its adoption of the principle that ordinary people, not the landowner, should choose the ministers.

Major centres include Dunedin (the principal city), Oamaru, Balclutha, Alexandra, and the major tourist centres Queenstown and Wānaka. Kaitangata in South Otago is a prominent source of coal. The Clutha river provides much of the country's hydroelectric power. Vineyards and wineries have been developed in the Central Otago wine region. Some parts of the area originally covered by Otago Province are now in either Canterbury Regional Council or Southland Regional Council.

== History ==
Like the rest of New Zealand, Otago was first settled by the Māori people. Most of the Māori settlement in the region was on the coast and centred around the Otago Peninsula.

The European Otago settlement, an offshoot of the Free Church of Scotland, was founded in March 1848 with the arrival of the first two immigrant ships from Greenock on the Firth of Clyde—the John Wickliffe and the Philip Laing. Captain William Cargill, a veteran of the Peninsular War, was the secular leader. Otago citizens elected him to the office of provincial superintendent after the New Zealand provinces were created in 1853. The Otago Province covered the whole of New Zealand from the Waitaki River south, including Stewart Island and the sub-Antarctic islands. It included the territory of the later Southland Province and also the much more extensive lands of the modern Southland Region.

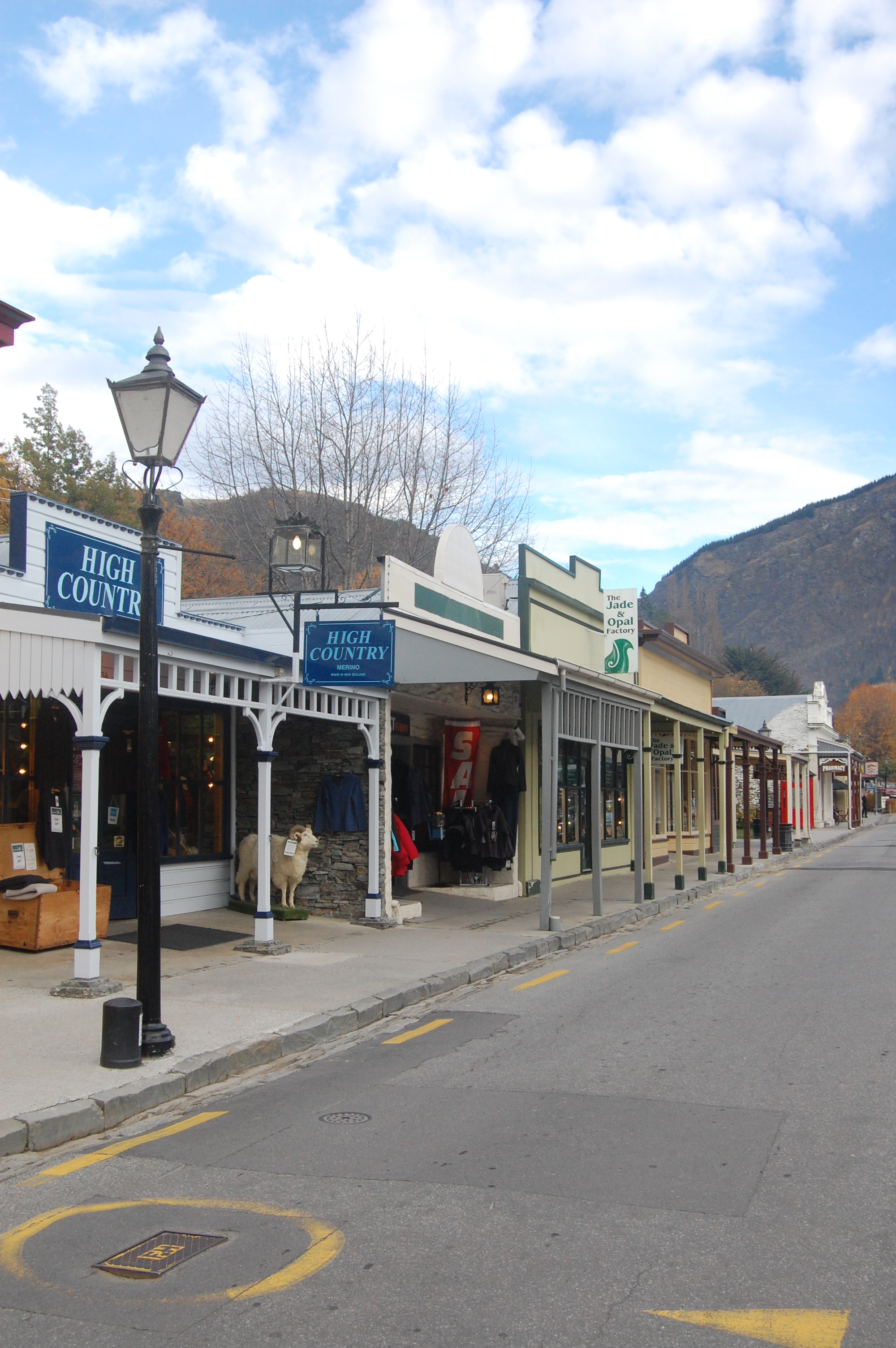
Arrowtown, a historic mining town

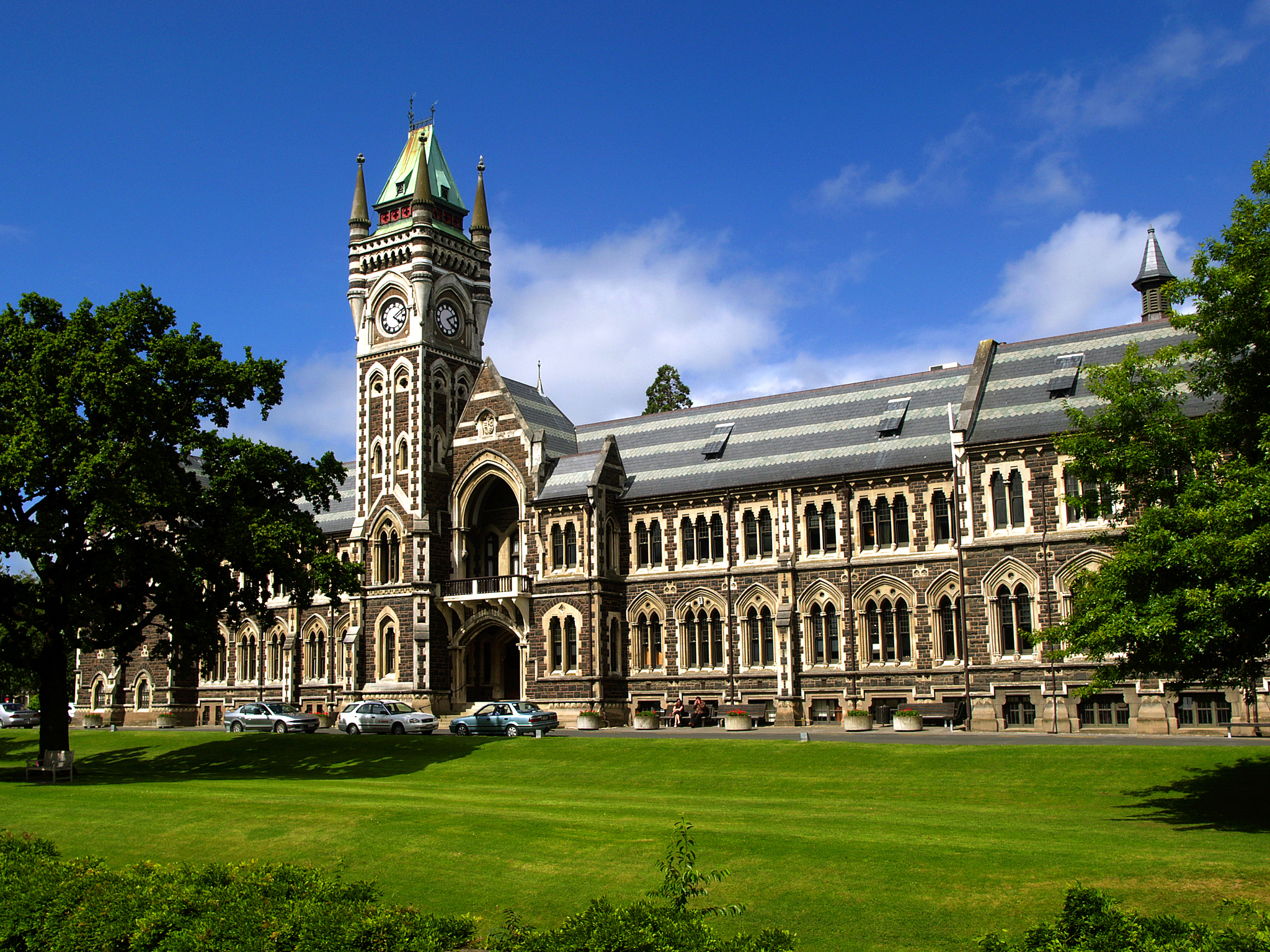
The University of Otago, New Zealand's oldest university, founded in 1869

Initial settlement was concentrated on the port and city, then expanded, notably to the south-west, where the fertile Taieri Plains offered good farmland. The 1860s saw rapid commercial expansion after Gabriel Read discovered gold at Gabriel's Gully near Lawrence in 1861, and the Otago gold rush ensued. Veterans of goldfields in California and Australia, plus many other fortune-seekers from Europe, North America and China, poured into the Province of Otago, eroding its Scottish Presbyterian character. Further gold discoveries at Clyde and on the Arrow River around Arrowtown led to a boom, and Otago became for a period the cultural and economic centre of New Zealand. New Zealand's first daily newspaper, the Otago Daily Times, originally edited by Julius Vogel, dates from this period.

New Zealand's first university, the University of Otago, was founded in 1869 as the provincial university in Dunedin.

The Province of Southland separated from Otago Province and set up its own Provincial Council at Invercargill in 1861. After difficulties ensued, Otago re-absorbed it in 1870. Its territory is included in the southern region of the old Otago Province which is named after it and is now the territory of the Southland region. The provincial governments were abolished in 1876 when the Abolition of the Provinces Act came into force on 1 November 1876, and were replaced by other forms of local authority, including counties. Two in Otago were named after the Scottish independence heroes Wallace and Bruce. From this time the national limelight gradually shifted northwards.

Otago's flag was chosen from a 2004 competition. It was designed by Gregor Macaulay.

== Geography ==
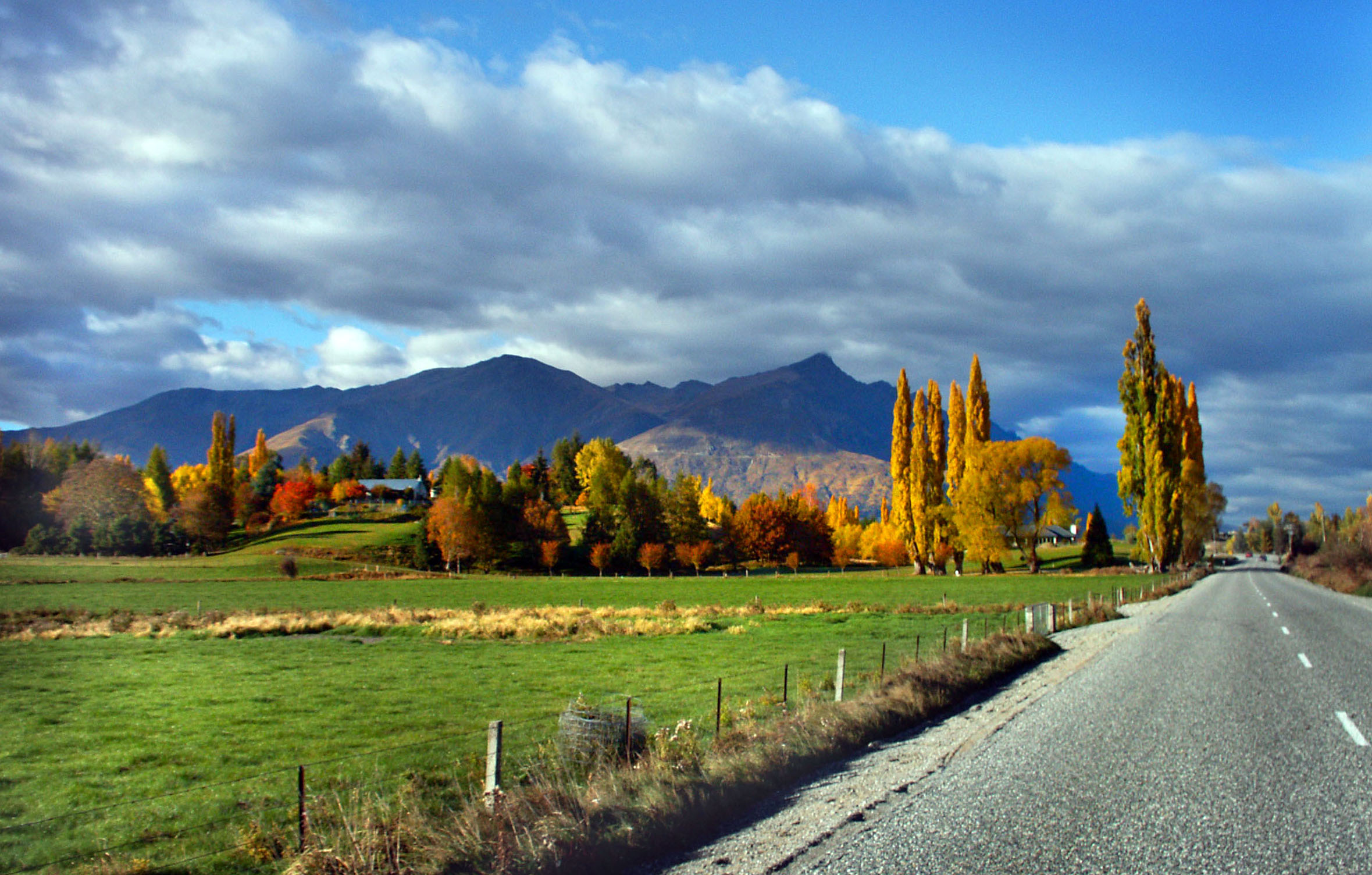
Autumn in Otago, 2004

Beginning from the west, the geography of Otago consists of high alpine mountains. The highest peak in Otago (and highest outside the Aoraki / Mount Cook area) is Mount Aspiring / Tititea, which is on the Main Divide. From the high mountains the rivers discharge into large glacial lakes. In this part of Otago glacial activity – both recent and very old – dominates the landscape, with large U-shaped valleys and rivers which have high sediment loads. River flows also vary dramatically, with large flood flows occurring after heavy rain. Lakes Wakatipu, Wānaka, and Hāwea form the sources of the Clutha River / Mata-Au, the largest river (by discharge) in New Zealand. The Clutha flows generally to the southeast through Otago and discharges near Balclutha. The river has been used for hydroelectric power generation, with large dams at Clyde and Roxburgh.

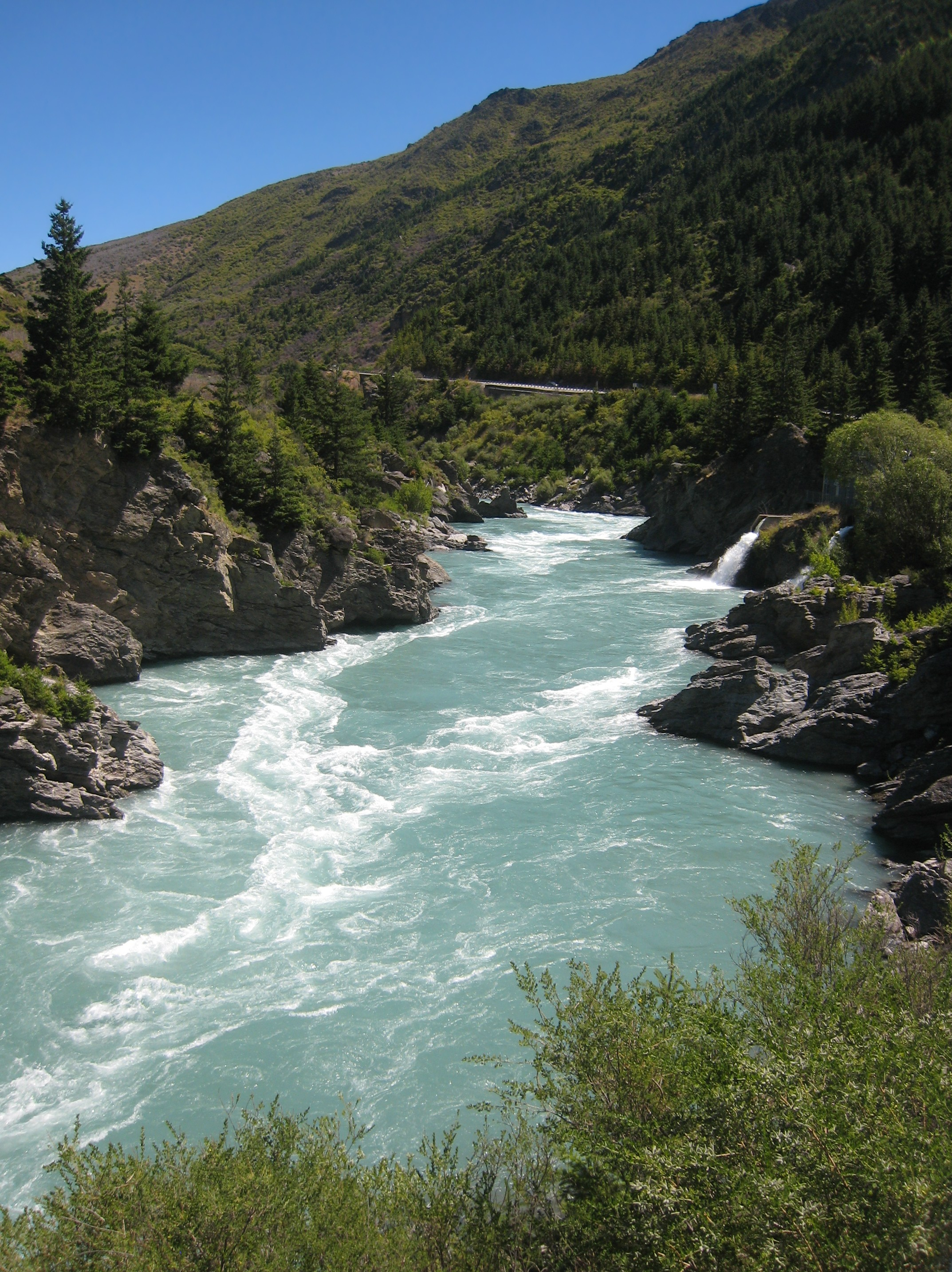
Kawarau Gorge, where Roaring Meg joins the Kawarau River, in central Otago

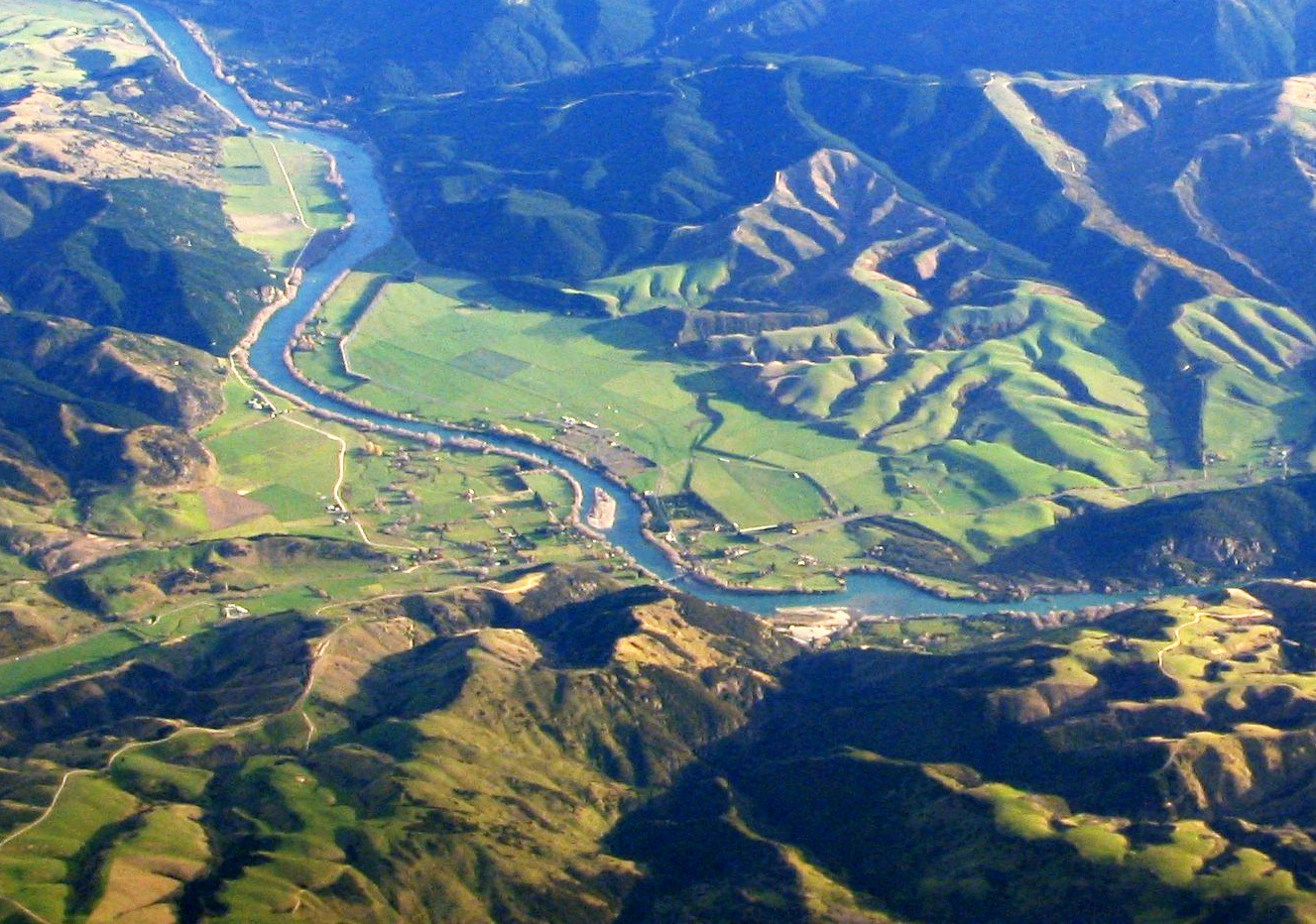
The Beaumont area, looking southwest. State Highway 8 runs across the photo (only visible in the right half), crossing the Clutha River just below centre.

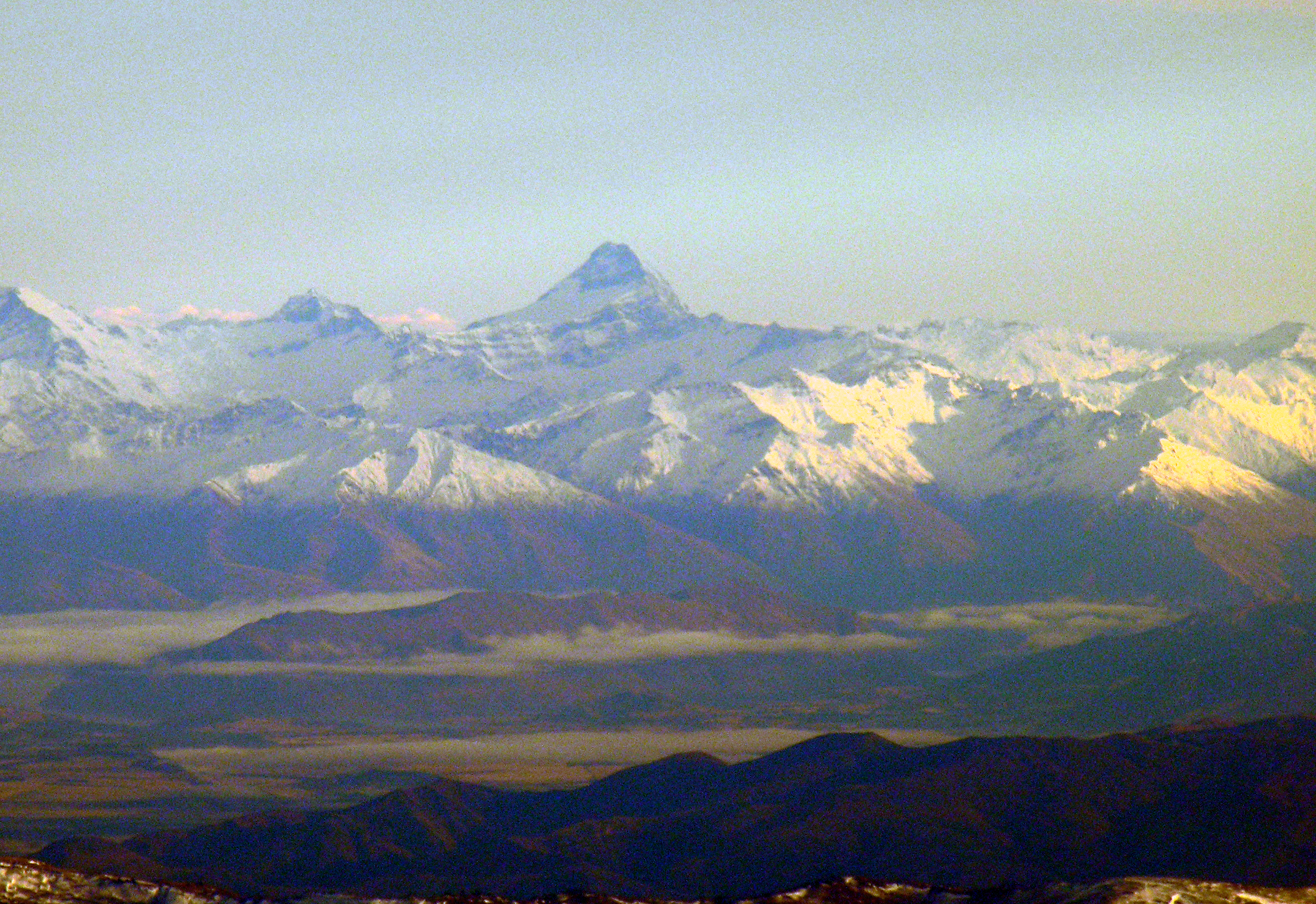
Mount Aspiring / Tititea is New Zealand's highest mountain outside the Aoraki / Mount Cook region.

The country's fourth-longest river, the Taieri, also has both its source and outflow in Otago, rising from rough hill country and following a broad horseshoe-shaped path, north, then east, and finally southeast, before reaching the Pacific Ocean. Along its course it forms two notable geographic features – the broad high valley of the Strath-Taieri in its upper reaches, and the fertile Taieri Plains as it approaches the ocean.

Travelling east from the mountains, the Central Otago drylands predominate. These are Canterbury–Otago tussock grasslands dominated by the block mountains, upthrust schist mountains. In contrast to Canterbury, where the Northwest winds blow across the plains without interruption, in Otago the block mountains impede and dilute the effects of the Nor'wester.

The main Central Otago centres, such as Alexandra and Cromwell, are found in the intermontane basins between the block mountains. The schist bedrock influence extends to the eastern part of Otago, where remnant volcanics mark its edge. The remains of the most spectacular of these are the Miocene volcanics centred on Otago Harbour. Elsewhere, basalt outcrops can be found along the coast and at other sites.

Comparatively similar terrain exists in the high plateau land of the Maniototo Plain, which lies to the east of Central Otago, close to the upper reaches of the Taieri River. This area is sparsely populated, but of historical note for its importance during the Otago gold rush of the 1860s. The townships of Ranfurly and Naseby also lie in this area.

In the southeastern corner of Otago lies The Catlins, an area of rough hill country which geologically forms part of the Murihiku terrane, an accretion which extends inland through the Hokonui Hills in the Southland region. This itself forms part of a larger system known as the Southland Syncline, which links to similar formations in Nelson (offset by the Alpine Fault) and even in New Caledonia, 3,500 km (2,200 mi) away.

The Catlins ranges are strike ridges composed of Triassic and Jurassic sandstones, mudstones and other related sedimentary rocks, often with a high incidence of feldspar. Fossils of the late and middle Triassic Warepan and Kaihikuan stages are found in the area.

== Climate ==
Weather conditions vary enormously across Otago, but can be broken into two broad types: the coastal climate of the coastal regions and the more continental climate of the interior.

Coastal regions of Otago are subject to the alternating warm and dry/cool and wet weather patterns common to the interannual Southern oscillation. The Southern Hemisphere storm track produces an irregular short cycle of weather which repeats roughly every week, with three or four days of fine weather followed by three or four days of cooler, damp conditions. Drier conditions are often the result of the northwesterly föhn wind, which dries as it crosses the Southern Alps. Wetter air is the result of approaching low-pressure systems which sweep fronts over the country from the southwest. A common variant in this pattern is the centring of a stationary low-pressure zone to the southeast of the country, resulting in long-lasting cool, wet conditions. These have been responsible for several notable historical floods, such as the "hundred year floods" of October 1878 and October 1978.

Typically, winters are cool and wet in the extreme south areas and snow can fall and settle to sea level in winter, especially in the hills and plains of South Otago. More Central and Northern Coastal areas winter is sunnier and drier. Summers, by contrast, tend to be warm and dry, with temperatures often reaching the high 20s and low 30s Celsius.

In Central Otago cold frosty winters are succeeded by hot dry summers. Central Otago's climate is the closest approximation to a continental climate anywhere in New Zealand. This climate is part of the reason why Central Otago vineyards are successful in this region. This inland region is one of the driest regions in the country, sheltered from prevailing rain-bearing weather conditions by the high mountains to the west and hills of the south. Summers can be hot, with temperatures often approaching or exceeding 30 °C (86 °F); winters, by contrast, are often bitterly cold – the township of Ranfurly in Central Otago holds the New Zealand record for lowest temperature with a reading of −25.6 °C (−14.1 °F) on 18 July 1903.

== Population ==
Otago Region covers 31,186.16 km^{2} (12,041.04 sq mi). The population is 253,900 as of June 2025, which is approximately 4.8 percent of New Zealand's total population of 5.3 million. The population density is 8.1 people per km^{2}. About 41.0 percent of the population resides in the Dunedin urban area—the region's main city and the country's sixth largest urban area. For historical and geographical reasons, Dunedin is usually regarded as one of New Zealand's four main centres. Unlike other southern centres, Dunedin's population has not declined since the 1970s, largely due to the presence of the University of Otago – and especially its medical school – which attracts students from all over New Zealand and overseas.

Other significant urban centres in Otago with populations over 1,000 include: Queenstown, Oamaru, Wānaka, Port Chalmers, Cromwell, Alexandra, Balclutha, Milton and Mosgiel. Between 1996 and 2006, the population of the Queenstown-Lakes District grew by 60% due to the region's booming tourism industry.

Urban areas in Otago
Urban area	Population (June 2025)	% of region
Dunedin (Note: Includes Port Chalmers but not Mosgiel.)	104,000	41.0%
Queenstown	29,000	11.4%
Mosgiel	15,100	5.9%
Oamaru	14,300	5.6%
Wānaka	13,200	5.2%
Cromwell	7,470	2.9%
Alexandra	5,860	2.3%
Balclutha	4,460	1.8%
Arrowtown	2,860	1.1%
Milton	2,120	0.8%
Brighton	1,470	0.6%
Waikouaiti	1,310	0.5%
Clyde	1,200	0.5%

Historical population
Year	Pop.	±% p.a.
1991	177,525	—
1996	185,085	+0.84%
2001	181,542	−0.39%
2006	193,803	+1.32%
2013	202,470	+0.63%
2018	225,186	+2.15%
2023	240,900	+1.36%

Largest groups of overseas-born residents
Nationality	Population (2018)
England	10,710
Australia	5,160
China	2,442
United States of America	2,226
Philippines	2,157
India	2,046
Scotland	1,908
South Africa	1,755
Germany	1,134
Brazil	1,089

Otago had a population of 240,900 in the 2023 New Zealand census, an increase of 15,714 people (7.0%) since the 2018 census, and an increase of 38,430 people (19.0%) since the 2013 census. There were 118,524 males, 121,185 females and 1,188 people of other genders in 94,425 dwellings. 4.3% of people identified as LGBTIQ+. The median age was 38.4 years (compared with 38.1 years nationally). There were 37,749 people (15.7%) aged under 15 years, 53,532 (22.2%) aged 15 to 29, 106,926 (44.4%) aged 30 to 64, and 42,690 (17.7%) aged 65 or older.

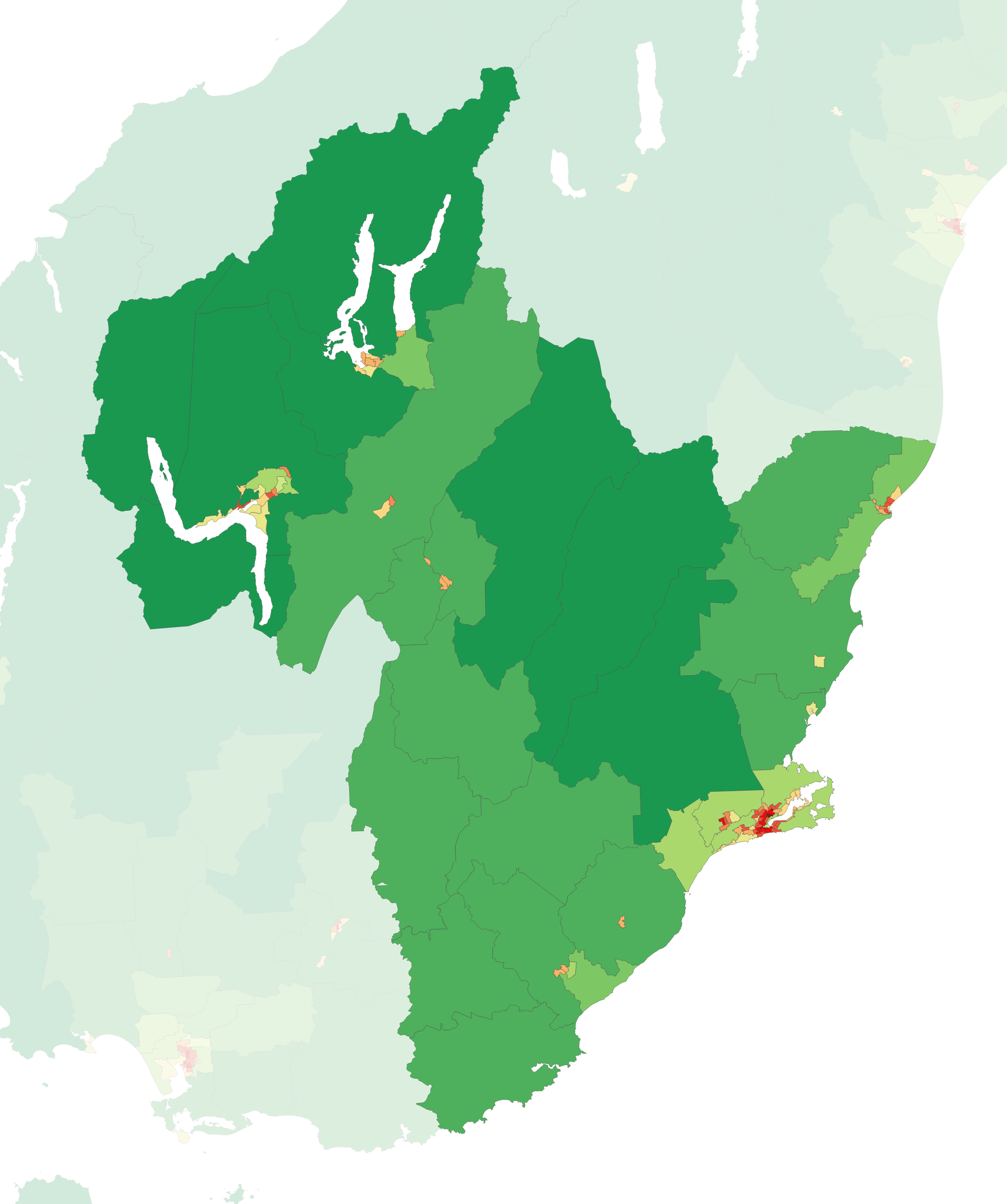
A map showing population density in the Otago Region at the 2023 census

People could identify as more than one ethnicity. The results were 85.2% European (Pākehā); 9.9% Māori; 3.4% Pasifika; 8.5% Asian; 2.2% Middle Eastern, Latin American and African New Zealanders (MELAA); and 2.7% other, which includes people giving their ethnicity as "New Zealander". English was spoken by 97.5%, Māori language by 1.9%, Samoan by 0.6% and other languages by 11.9%. No language could be spoken by 1.7% (e.g. too young to talk). New Zealand Sign Language was known by 0.5%. The percentage of people born overseas was 23.8, compared with 28.8% nationally.

Religious affiliations were 28.4% Christian, 1.0% Hindu, 0.8% Islam, 0.2% Māori religious beliefs, 0.7% Buddhist, 0.5% New Age, 0.1% Jewish, and 1.4% other religions. People who answered that they had no religion were 60.3%, and 6.6% of people did not answer the census question.

Of those at least 15 years old, 40,458 (19.9%) people had a bachelor's or higher degree, 106,080 (52.2%) had a post-high school certificate or diploma, and 43,974 (21.6%) people exclusively held high school qualifications. The median income was $39,100, compared with $41,500 nationally. 19,692 people (9.7%) earned over $100,000 compared to 12.1% nationally. The employment status of those at least 15 was that 101,514 (50.0%) people were employed full-time, 31,086 (15.3%) were part-time, and 4,848 (2.4%) were unemployed.

The majority of the population of European lineage is of Scottish stock—the descendants of early Scottish settlers from the early 19th century. Other well-represented European groups include those of English, Irish, and Dutch descent. A large proportion of the Māori population are from the Ngāi Tahu iwi or tribe. Other significant ethnic minorities include Asians, Pacific Islanders, Africans, Latin Americans and Middle Easterners. Otago's early waves of settlement, especially during and immediately after the gold rush of the 1860s, included a substantial minority of southern (Guangdong) Chinese settlers, and a smaller but also prominent number of people from Lebanon. The region's Jewish population also experienced a small influx at this time. The early and middle years of the twentieth century saw smaller influxes of immigrants from several mainland European countries, most notably the Netherlands.

In line with the region's Scottish heritage, Presbyterianism is the largest Christian denomination with 17.1 percent affiliating, while Catholicism is the second-largest denomination with 11.5 percent affiliating.

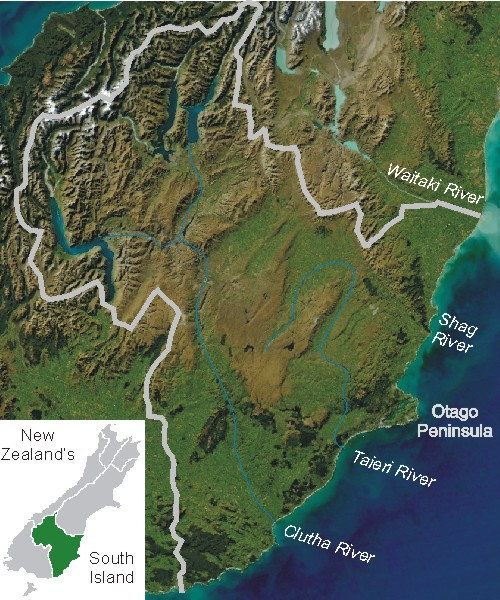
Locations of main settlements in Otago

== Politics ==
=== Local government ===
The seat of the Otago Regional Council is in Dunedin. The council is chaired by Andrew Noone as of July 2021.

There are five territorial authorities in Otago:

- Queenstown-Lakes District
- Central Otago District
- Dunedin City
- Clutha District
- Waitaki District

=== Parliamentary representation ===
Otago is represented by four parliamentary electorates. Dunedin and nearby towns are represented by the Dunedin electorate, held by Rachel Brooking, and the Taieri electorate, occupied by Ingrid Leary. Both MPs are members of the Labour Party, and Dunedin has traditionally been a Labour stronghold. Since 2008 the rest of Otago has been divided between the large rural electorates of Waitaki, which also includes some of the neighbouring Canterbury Region, and Clutha-Southland, which also includes most of the rural part of the neighbouring Southland Region. The Waitaki electorate has traditionally been a National Party stronghold and is currently held by Miles Anderson. The Southland electorate, also a National Party stronghold, is currently represented by Joseph Mooney. The earlier Otago electorate existed from 1978 to 2008, when it was split and merged into Waitaki and Clutha-Southland.

Two list MPs are based in Dunedin – Michael Woodhouse of the National Party and Rachel Brooking of the Labour Party. One-time Labour Party Deputy Leader David Parker is a former MP for the Otago electorate and currently a list MP.

Under the Māori electorates system, Otago is also part of the large Te Tai Tonga electorate, which covers the entire South Island and surrounding islands, and is currently held by Te Pāti Māori Party MP Tākuta Ferris.

=== Ngāi Tahu governance ===
Three of the 18 Ngāi Tahu Rūnanga (councils) are based in the Otago Region. Each one is centred on a coastal marae, namely Ōtākou, Moeraki and Puketeraki at Karitane. There is also the Arai Te Uru Marae in Dunedin.

== Economy ==
The subnational gross domestic product (GDP) of Otago was estimated at NZ$14.18 billion in the year to March 2020, 4.38% of New Zealand's national GDP. The regional GDP per capita was estimated at $58,353 in the same period. In the year to March 2018, primary industries contributed $1.25 billion (9.8%) to the regional GDP, goods-producing industries contributed $2.38 billion (18.6%), service industries contributed $8.05 billion (63.0%), and taxes and duties contributed $1.10 billion (8.6%).

Otago has a mixed economy. Dunedin is home to manufacturing, publishing and technology-based industries. Rural economies have been reinvigorated in the 1990s and 2000s: in Clutha district, farms have been converted from sheep to more lucrative dairying. Vineyard planting and production remained modest until the middle of the 1990s when the New Zealand wine industry began to expand rapidly. The Central Otago wine region produces wine made from varieties such as the Pinot noir, Chardonnay, Sauvignon blanc, Merlot and Riesling grapes. It has an increasing reputation as New Zealand's leading Pinot noir region.

The two main airports in the region are Dunedin Airport and Queenstown Airport.

== Education ==
Otago has numerous rural primary schools, several small town primary and secondary schools, and some larger schools in Dunedin. Most are state schools which do not charge tuition, except for international students. Some are state integrated schools, former private schools with a special character based on a religious or philosophical belief that has been integrated into the state system, but still charge "attendance dues" to cover the building and maintenance of school buildings. These schools are not owned by the government, but otherwise they like state schools cannot charge fees for tuition of domestic students but may request a donation. As Dunedin was founded by Presbyterian Scottish settlers there are a Presbyterian girls' and boys' school in the city. Unlike other major cities in New Zealand, Dunedin does not have any private intermediate or high schools, as all remaining private intermediate and high schools have been integrated into the state system.

== See also ==
- North Otago, the northern area of the region
- Otago Central Rail Trail
- Otago Rugby Football Union
- North Otago Rugby Football Union
