= Rachel Brooking =

New Zealand Labour Party politician

The Honourable Rachel Brooking MP
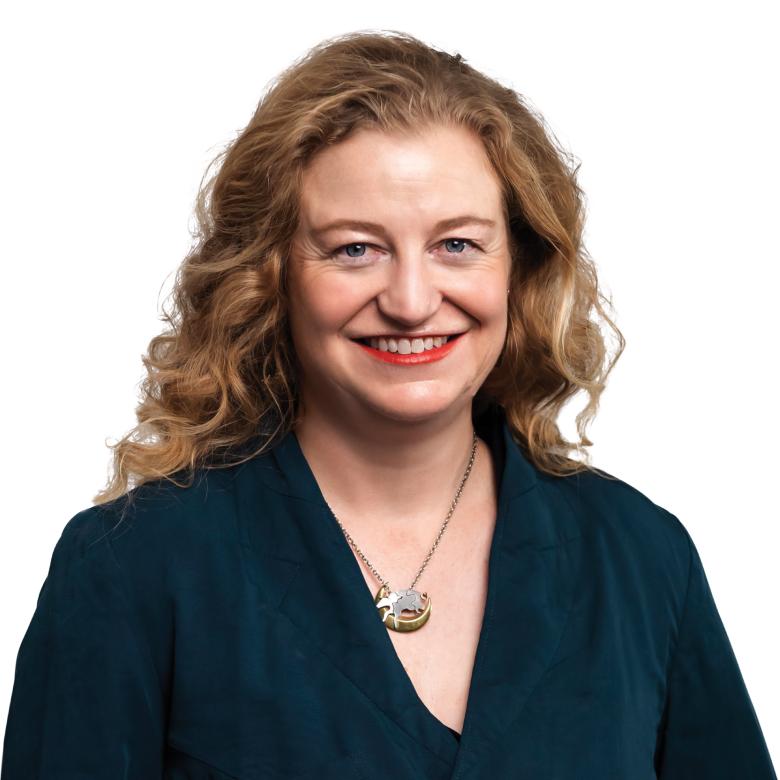
- Brooking in 2023

13th Minister for Oceans and Fisheries
- In office 12 April 2023 – 27 November 2023
- Prime Minister: Chris Hipkins
- Preceded by: David Parker (acting)
- Succeeded by: Shane Jones

Member of the New Zealand Parliament for Dunedin
- Incumbent
- Assumed office 14 October 2023
- Preceded by: David Clark

Member of the New Zealand Parliament for Labour party list
- In office 17 October 2020 – 14 October 2023

Personal details
- Born: 18 October 1975 (age 51)
- Party: Labour
- Spouse: Chris Jackson
- Children: 3
- Education: University of Otago
- Profession: Lawyer

Rachel Jane Brooking (born 18 October 1975) is a New Zealand lawyer and politician.

Brooking was elected to the New Zealand House of Representatives at the 2020 New Zealand general election. She was Minister for Oceans and Fisheries and Minister for Food Safety in the Sixth Labour Government.

== Early life and career ==
Brooking grew up in Dunedin, where she attended Otago Girls' High School. Brooking has a double degree in ecology and law from the University of Otago.

Prior to entering Parliament, Brooking worked as a lawyer. She specialised in environmental, resource management and local government law, and worked for a period for the Parliamentary Commissioner for the Environment in Wellington before returning to Dunedin to practice law with Anderson Lloyd. In 2019, Brooking was appointed to a government panel charged with reviewing the Resource Management Act 1991. She was previously the chair of the Otago/Southland branch of the Resource Management Law Association.

Brooking became a student activist in 1994, her first year at university, protesting against education minister Lockwood Smith over excessively high student fees. She was elected president of the Otago University Students' Association in 1997. In 2010, Brooking was appointed to the board of University Book Shop (Otago) Ltd, and in 2019 to the board of Dunedin International Airport.

== Political career ==
New Zealand Parliament
Years	Term	Electorate	List	Party
2020–2023	53rd	List	46	Labour
2023–2026	54th	Dunedin	23	Labour
2026–present	55th	Dunedin	11	Labour

=== First term, 2020–2023 ===
At the 2020 election Brooking stood for Parliament for the Labour Party. She hoped to be Labour's candidate for the Dunedin South electorate, later renamed Taieri, but Labour selected Ingrid Leary instead. Brooking was ranked 46 on the party list, which was a high enough ranking to enter Parliament. In her first term, she was appointed deputy chair of the environment committee and the regulations review committee.

The day after Dunedin MP David Clark announced on 13 December 2022 that he would retire, Brooking said she would seek the Labour candidacy for the electorate in 2023, for which she was selected.

On 11 April 2023, Brooking was appointed as Minister of Oceans and Fisheries, and also allocated the associate environment and immigration portfolios. She was a minister outside cabinet. Brooking was given the Food Safety portfolio following Meka Whaitiri's switch to Te Pāti Māori.

On 6 October 2023 Brooking, in her capacity as Oceans and Fisheries Minister, along with Minister of Conservation Willow-Jean Prime announced that the Government would create six new marine reserves between Timaru and the Catlins in the lower South Island. In late June 2024, the Department of Conservation delayed plans to create these six marine reserves, citing logistical concerns.

=== Second term, 2023–2026 ===
During the 2023 election, she won the Dunedin electorate seat, defeating National's candidate Michael Woodhouse by a margin of 7,980 votes.

In late November 2023, Brooking was given the environment, food safety, and space portfolios in the Shadow Cabinet of Chris Hipkins.

On 5 December 2023, Brooking was granted retention of the title The Honourable, in recognition of her term as a member of the Executive Council.

On 7 March 2025, Brooking gained the RMA Reform portfolio in addition to her existing portfolios.

=== Third term, 2026–present ===
During the 2026 New Zealand general election, Brooking was ranked 11th on the Labour Party list. She contested the Dunedin electorate. On 7 November, Brooking retained the Dunedin electorate by a margin of 8,718 votes based on preliminary results.

== Personal life ==
Brooking is married to Chris Jackson, a cancer specialist who was the medical director for the Cancer Society of New Zealand. They have three children. Her father Tom Brooking is an emeritus history professor and retired lecturer at the University of Otago.

New Zealand Parliament
Preceded by David Clark	Member of Parliament for Dunedin; 2023–present	Incumbent
Political offices
Preceded by Stuart Nash	Minister for Oceans and Fisheries; 2023	Succeeded by Shane Jones
