= Kaka Point =

- Rural settlement
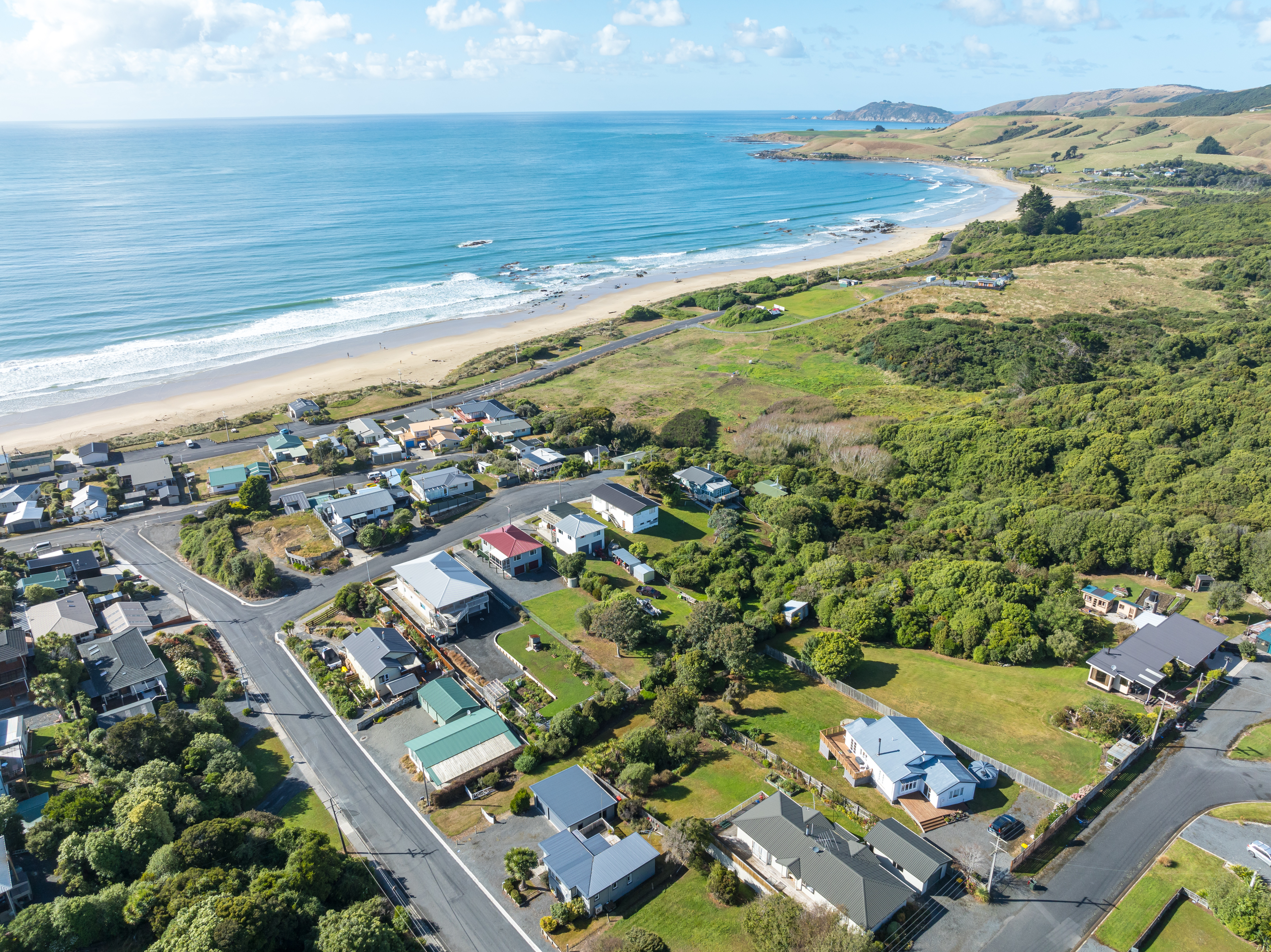
- Aerial Kaka Point
- Interactive map of Kaka Point
- Coordinates: 46°23′S 169°47′E
- Country: New Zealand
- Region: Otago
- Territorial authority: Clutha District
- Ward: Catlins
- Electorates: Taieri; Te Tai Tonga (Māori)

Government
  - Territorial authority: Clutha District Council
  - Regional council: Otago Regional Council
  - Mayor of Clutha: Jock Martin
  - Taieri MP: Ingrid Leary
  - Te Tai Tonga MP: Tākuta Ferris

Area
  - Total: 0.36 km^{2} (0.14 sq mi)

Population (June 2025)
  - Total: 230
  - Density: 640/km^{2} (1,700/sq mi)
- Time zone: UTC+12 (New Zealand Standard Time)
  - Summer (DST): UTC+13 (New Zealand Daylight Time)
- Postcode: 9271
- Local iwi: Ngāi Tahu

Kaka Point is a small town at the northern edge of The Catlins, an area of the southern South Island of New Zealand. It is located 15 kilometres (9.3 miles) south of Balclutha and 8 km north of the headland of Nugget Point. It has a seasonally fluctuating population, and there are numerous cribs (holiday homes) at the settlement. The settlement's best−known resident was Māori poet Hone Tuwhare, who lived in Kaka Point for many years until he died in 2008. Kaka Point is named for the kākā bird, whose signature call is "ka-aa."

There is a restaurant, a motel, bed and breakfasts establishments, and a camping grounds in Kaka Point.

== Demographics ==
Kaka Point is described by Statistics New Zealand as a rural settlement. It covers 0.36 km^{2} (0.14 sq mi), and had an estimated population of 230 as of June 2025, with a population density of 639 people per km^{2}. It is part of the much larger Catlins statistical area.

Historical population
Year	Pop.	±% p.a.
2006	201	—
2013	222	+1.43%
2018	231	+0.80%

Kaka Point had a population of 231 at the 2018 New Zealand census, an increase of 9 people (4.1%) since the 2013 census, and an increase of 30 people (14.9%) since the 2006 census. There were 114 households, comprising 114 males and 117 females, giving a sex ratio of 0.97 males per female. The median age was 54.5 years (compared with 37.4 years nationally), with 33 people (14.3%) aged under 15 years, 12 (5.2%) aged 15 to 29, 120 (51.9%) aged 30 to 64, and 63 (27.3%) aged 65 or older.

Ethnicities were 96.1% European/Pākehā, 3.9% Māori, and 1.3% other ethnicities. People may identify with more than one ethnicity.

Although some people chose not to answer the census's question about religious affiliation, 53.2% had no religion, 39.0% were Christian, 1.3% were Buddhist and 1.3% had other religions.

Of those at least 15 years old, 33 (16.7%) people had a bachelor's or higher degree, and 54 (27.3%) people had no formal qualifications. The median income was $35,600, compared with $31,800 nationally. 27 people (13.6%) earned over $70,000 compared to 17.2% nationally. The employment status of those at least 15 was that 99 (50.0%) people were employed full-time, 30 (15.2%) were part-time, and 3 (1.5%) were unemployed.
