= Fletcher House (Otago Peninsula) =

Historic building in New Zealand

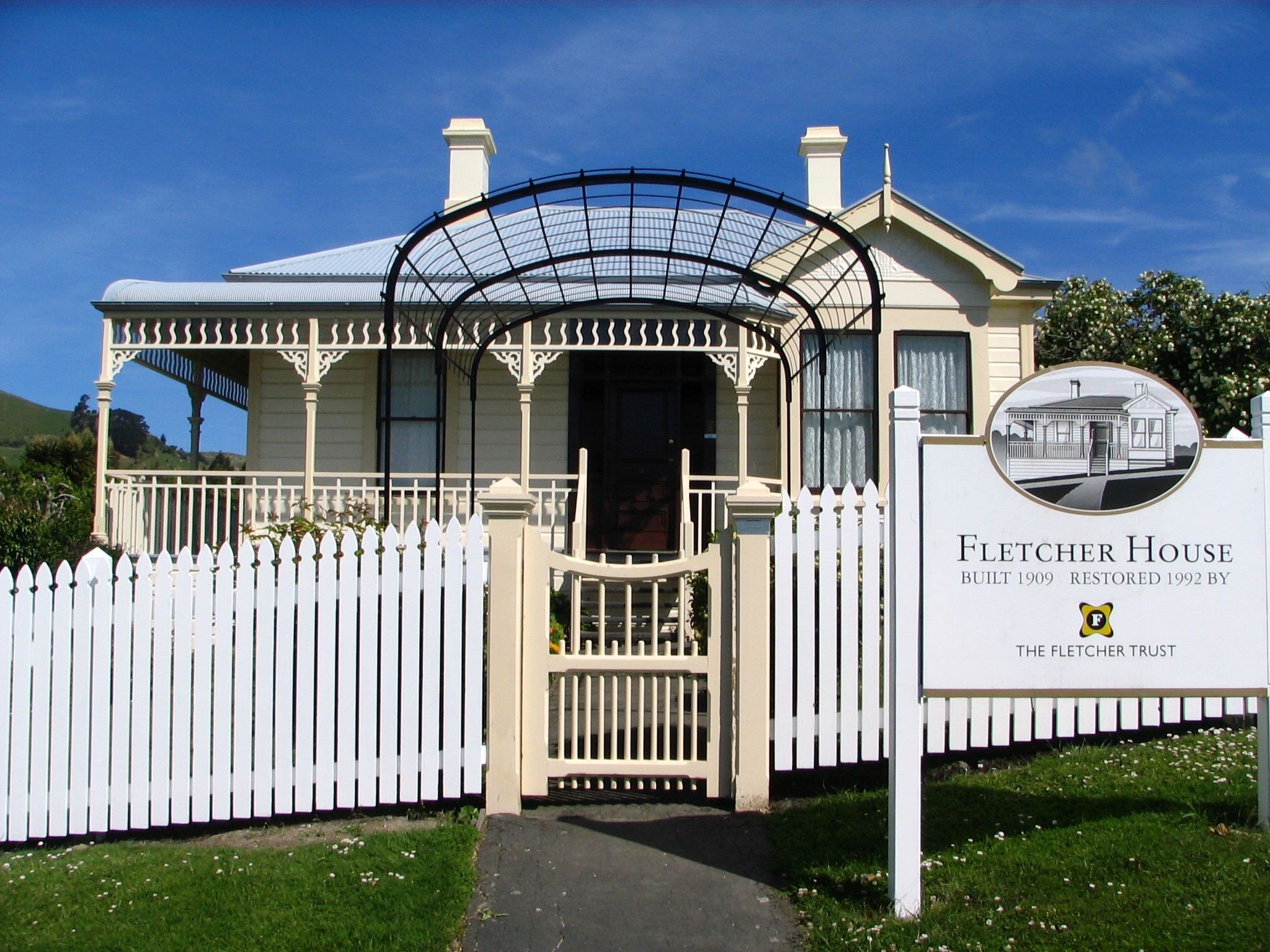
- Fletcher House in 2008
- Interactive map of the Fletcher House area

General information
- Type: Residential
- Architectural style: Edwardian
- Location: 727 Portobello Road, Broad Bay, Dunedin, New Zealand
- Coordinates: 45°50′46″S 170°37′41″E
- Completed: 1909

Design and construction
- Main contractor: Fletcher and Morris

Heritage New Zealand – Category 2
- Designated: 19 April 1990
- Reference no.: 5230

Fletcher House is a historic house at Broad Bay on Otago Peninsula, part of the New Zealand city of Dunedin. The house was one of the first to be built by Sir James Fletcher, the founder of one of New Zealand's biggest companies, Fletcher Construction. The house is located at 727 Portobello Road, Broad Bay, on a promontory overlooking nearby Turnbulls Bay. The property is managed by the Otago Peninsula Trust, with the help of financial support from the Fletcher Trust. It is the only fully restored and furnished Edwardian house of its type in New Zealand.

A typical Edwardian house, it was built in 1909 for local postmaster Hubert Green and his new wife Agnes. As Broad Bay was a popular holiday spot for wealthier Dunedinites, Fletcher's reputation quickly spread, and his company grew as a result.

In December 1990 Fletcher Challenge bought and restored the villa to its former glory with help from Toitū Otago Settlers Museum. The house is now open to the public, and is listed as a Category II historic place by Heritage New Zealand. It is one of several historic homes open to the public in the vicinity, among them Larnach Castle and Glenfalloch.

== Timeline ==
- 1909: James Fletcher and business partner Albert Morris build the house
- 1910–31: The house is owned by Hubert and Agnes Green
- 1931–38: The house is owned by three sisters named Miller
- 1938–81: The house is owned by a couple named Patterson. They reside here for over 40 years, and make several alterations to the property, including lowering the ceiling of the dining room and replacing the front steps with a ramp suitable for a wheelchair.
- 1981–90: Mr and Mrs Dickson owned the property. They extend it at the rear, creating a new kitchen, bathroom, and laundry.
- 1990–92: Fletcher Challenge purchases the house and restore it and the garden, with the help of teams from Toitū Otago Settlers Museum and Dunedin Botanic Garden. The house is opened to the public in October 1992 by Sir James Fletcher, the son of the builder.
