= Macandrew Bay =

- Suburb
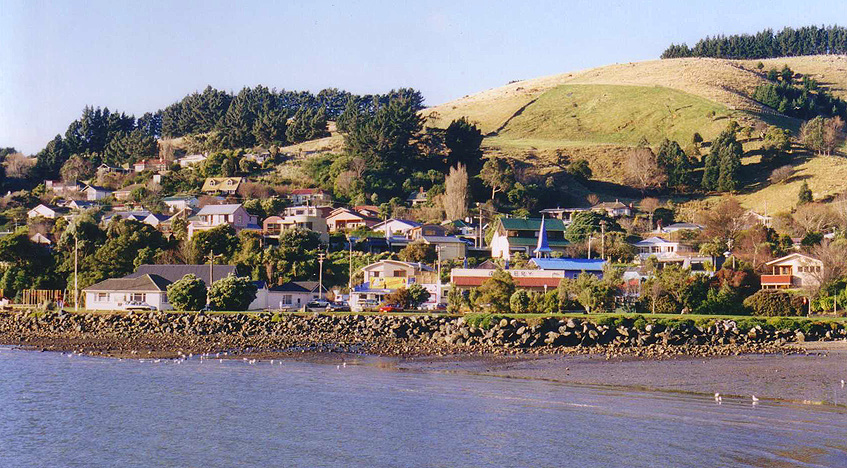
- Macandrew Bay
- Interactive map of Macandrew Bay
- Coordinates: 45°52′S 170°36′E
- Country: New Zealand
- City: Dunedin
- Local authority: Dunedin City Council
- Community board: Otago Peninsula Community Board

Area
  - Land: 258 ha (640 acres)

Population (June 2025)
  - Total: 1,590
  - Density: 616/km^{2} (1,600/sq mi)

(Otago Harbour)		Company Bay
	Macandrew Bay
Challis		Pukehiki

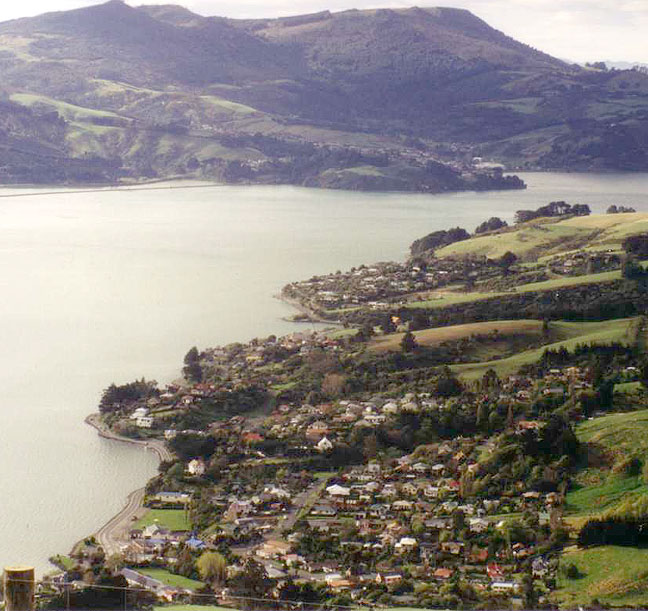
The Otago Harbour as seen from the ridge which runs along the top of the Otago Peninsula. The settlements of Company Bay (upper middle of picture) and Macandrew Bay (bottom of picture) are both shown.

Macandrew Bay (Māori: Te Roto Pāteke) is located on the Otago Peninsula in the South Island of New Zealand. It is situated on the edge of Otago Harbour, and is named for pioneer Scottish settler James Macandrew who lived here during his later life. The Te Reo Māori name for the bay, Te Roto Pāteke, refers to the Brown teal (Māori: Pāteke) formerly prevalent in the area. Early European residents of the area called the bay "The Hundreds", due to the large number of boulders which covered the foreshore.

Macandrew Bay is a suburb of Dunedin, but has the feel of an isolated coastal settlement and is often regarded as a separate township, even though the heart of the city is visible 10 kilometres away at the head of the harbour. It is both a commuter and a harbourside retreat from the city.

The settlement centres on an area around the junction of Portobello Road and Greenacres Street, the latter a narrow road which rises steeply towards the interior of the Peninsula. Greenacres Street roughly follows the valley of the small Rodgers Creek. The community hall lies on the lower part of Greenacres Street close to its junction with Portobello Road, and the settlement's few shops lie immediately to the southwest of the junction. Behind these shops lie the community's primary school and cemetery, the latter of which includes the grave of James Macandrew.

The bay has a small beach opposite the shops, which is well-used by the public. The beach was created artificially, with sand brought to the bay from the nearby Pacific coast. The area around the beach has been turned into a small public park, and landscaping of this was completed in 1979.

Macandrew Bay is the largest of several settlements which lie on the harbour coast of Otago Peninsula. Between it and Dunedin lies Glenfalloch, a private gardens open to the public.

Beyond Macandrew Bay to the northeast lie Company Bay and Raynbirds Bay and to the southwest is Colinswood, the latter named for James Macandrew's house. These small settlements could be considered "suburbs" of the Macandrew Bay. Beyond Raynbirds Bay lie Broad Bay and Portobello. These settlements are connected to each other and to Dunedin's city centre by Portobello Road, a winding road which runs along the harbour coast of the peninsula, and by the Otago Harbour Cycleway, which runs alongside it Both the road and the sea wall which lies along the harbour edge were constructed by prison labour in the 1860s.

A second route, Castlewood Road, rises from Company Bay to meet with Highcliff Road, which runs along the ridge of the peninsula from Dunedin to Portobello. Castlewood Road also connects with Camp Road, which leads to the stately home Larnach Castle, situated above Broad Bay.

== Demographics ==
The Macandrew Bay-Company Bay statistical area covers 2.58 km^{2} (1.00 sq mi) and had an estimated population of 1,590 as of June 2025, with a population density of 616 people per km^{2}.

Historical population
Year	Pop.	±% p.a.
2006	1,473	—
2013	1,518	+0.43%
2018	1,572	+0.70%

Macandrew Bay-Company Bay had a population of 1,572 at the 2018 New Zealand census, an increase of 54 people (3.6%) since the 2013 census, and an increase of 99 people (6.7%) since the 2006 census. There were 621 households, comprising 771 males and 798 females, giving a sex ratio of 0.97 males per female. The median age was 46.8 years (compared with 37.4 years nationally), with 315 people (20.0%) aged under 15 years, 174 (11.1%) aged 15 to 29, 789 (50.2%) aged 30 to 64, and 294 (18.7%) aged 65 or older.

Ethnicities were 93.3% European/Pākehā, 7.1% Māori, 2.3% Pasifika, 3.8% Asian, and 2.5% other ethnicities. People may identify with more than one ethnicity.

The percentage of people born overseas was 26.9, compared with 27.1% nationally.

Although some people chose not to answer the census's question about religious affiliation, 55.7% had no religion, 34.7% were Christian, 0.2% had Māori religious beliefs, 0.2% were Hindu, 0.2% were Muslim, 0.4% were Buddhist and 2.5% had other religions.

Of those at least 15 years old, 525 (41.8%) people had a bachelor's or higher degree, and 114 (9.1%) people had no formal qualifications. The median income was $39,700, compared with $31,800 nationally. 309 people (24.6%) earned over $70,000 compared to 17.2% nationally. The employment status of those at least 15 was that 624 (49.6%) people were employed full-time, 246 (19.6%) were part-time, and 30 (2.4%) were unemployed.

== Education ==
Macandrew Bay School is a state co-educational primary school for year 1 to 6 children, with a roll of 120 students as of March 2026. The school was opened in 1859.
