= Company Bay =

- Suburb
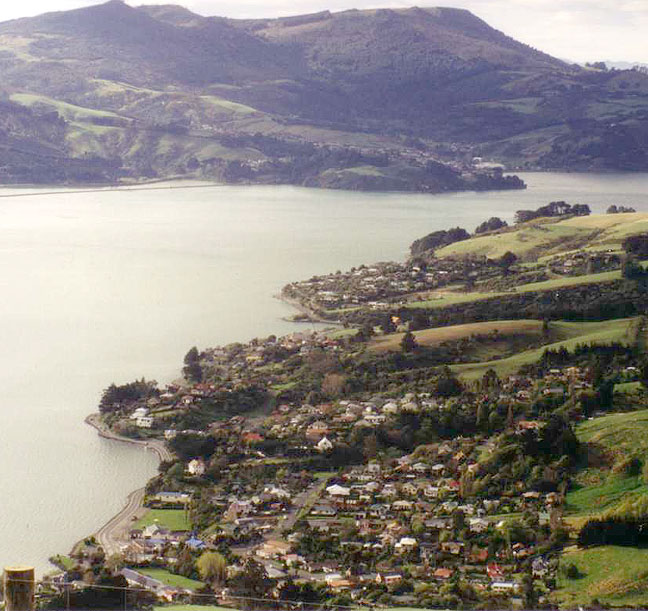
- The settlements of Company Bay (upper middle of picture) and Macandrew Bay (bottom of picture), taken from the ridge on the Otago Peninsula.
- Interactive map of Company Bay
- Coordinates: 45.858°S 170.601°E
- Country: New Zealand
- City: Dunedin
- Local authority: Dunedin City Council
- Community board: Otago Peninsula Community Board

Area
  - Land: 124 ha (310 acres)

Population (2018 Census)
  - Total: 375
  - Density: 302/km^{2} (783/sq mi)

(Otago Harbour)		Broad Bay
	Company Bay
	Macandrew Bay	Pukehiki

Company Bay is a semi-residential suburb of Dunedin, New Zealand, located on the Otago Peninsula between Macandrew Bay and Broad Bay. Access to surrounding suburbs and the centre of the city is via Portobello Road, which skirts the edge of Otago Harbour. A smaller, winding road ascends from the bay, linking with the peninsula's ridge road (Highcliff Road) close to Larnach Castle at Pukehiki.

== Geography ==
The suburb of Company Bay extends north-east from Macandrew Bay, an indentation along the Otago Harbour. The suburb encompasses the Bay and surrounding areas - from mission cove, extending into the hills and around to grassy point. Company Bay is a 20-minute drive from Dunedin city centre.

== Early history ==
Early settlers to Company Bay came in large family groups, rowing across the harbour from Port Chalmers. In the 1850s, the Bayne and Christie families were among the first settlers in the area. James Christie, a sawyer, and a number of local men began milling in the area to provide timber for the growing city of Dunedin. The company of sawmillers gave the name Company Bay to the area.

Sawyers in Company Bay used long handsaws to slice logs into planks, and carried them down to the jetty at the bottom of Luss Road before towing them into Dunedin with a boat. In the mid-1870s, a tram line was installed to move heavy timber down the hill to the jetty. A two week long fire in 1881 destroyed most of the trees in the area.

James Christie owned a large block of land which extended from Macandrew Bay to Company Bay and up to the top of the hill. During the 1880s depression, he sold most of his land; the top area to William Larnach. The harbourside was subdivided into smaller sections.

== Demographics ==
Historical population
Year	Pop.	±% p.a.
2006	270	—
2013	330	+2.91%
2018	375	+2.59%

Company Bay covers 1.24 km^{2} (0.48 sq mi), and is part of the larger Macandrew Bay-Company Bay statistical area.

It had a population of 375 at the 2018 New Zealand census, an increase of 45 people (13.6%) since the 2013 census, and an increase of 105 people (38.9%) since the 2006 census. There were 141 households, comprising 198 males and 180 females, giving a sex ratio of 1.1 males per female, with 78 people (20.8%) aged under 15 years, 39 (10.4%) aged 15 to 29, 204 (54.4%) aged 30 to 64, and 57 (15.2%) aged 65 or older.

Ethnicities were 92.8% European/Pākehā, 5.6% Māori, 1.6% Pasifika, 4.8% Asian, and 2.4% other ethnicities. People may identify with more than one ethnicity.

Although some people chose not to answer the census's question about religious affiliation, 54.4% had no religion, 37.6% were Christian and 0.8% had other religions.

Of those at least 15 years old, 108 (36.4%) people had a bachelor's or higher degree, and 27 (9.1%) people had no formal qualifications. 75 people (25.3%) earned over $70,000 compared to 17.2% nationally. The employment status of those at least 15 was that 156 (52.5%) people were employed full-time, 60 (20.2%) were part-time, and 6 (2.0%) were unemployed.
