= Broad Bay, New Zealand =

Broad Bay Whaka Oho Rahi (Māori)
- Settlement
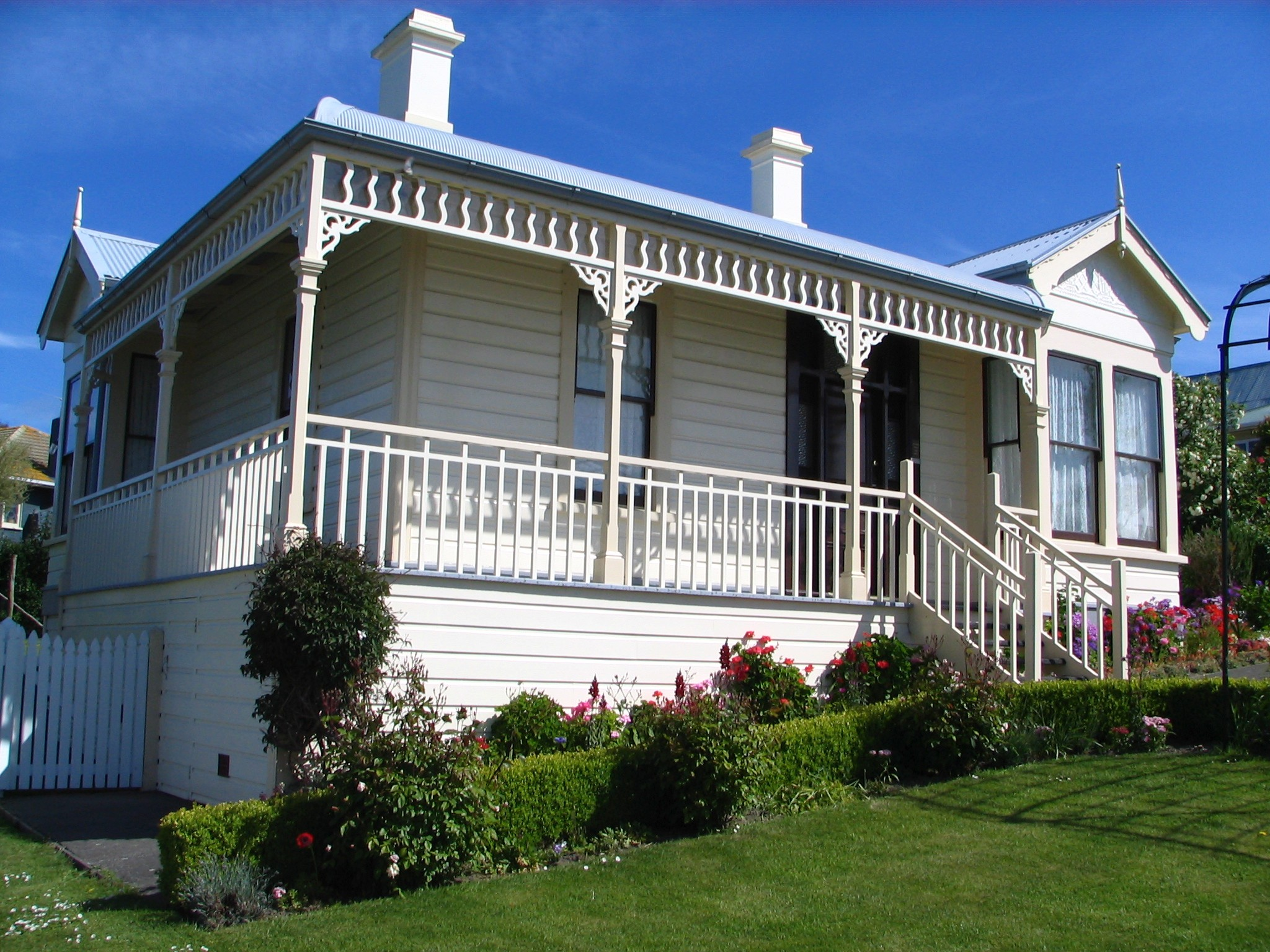
- Fletcher House in 2008
- Interactive map of Broad Bay
- Coordinates: 45°51′00″S 170°37′15″E
- Country: New Zealand
- Island: South Island
- Region: Otago
- Community board: Otago Peninsula Community Board
- Electorates: Dunedin; Te Tai Tonga (Māori)

Government
  - Territorial authority: Dunedin City Council
  - Regional council: Otago Regional Council
  - Mayor of Dunedin: Sophie Barker
  - Dunedin MP: Rachel Brooking
  - Te Tai Tonga MP: Tākuta Ferris

Area
  - Total: 1.63 km^{2} (0.63 sq mi)

Population (2018 Census)
  - Total: 564
  - Density: 346/km^{2} (896/sq mi)
- Time zone: UTC+12 (NZST)
  - Summer (DST): UTC+13 (NZDT)
- Area code: 03
- Local iwi: Ngāi Tahu

The settlement of Broad Bay (Māori: Whaka Oho Rahi) is located on the Otago Harbour coast of Otago Peninsula, in the South Island of New Zealand. It is administered as part of the city of Dunedin, and is technically a suburb of that city, though its isolation and semi-rural nature make it appear as a settlement in its own right.

Broad Bay is 13 kilometres (8.1 mi) to the east of the city centre, but due to the shape of the peninsula's coastline, the heart of the city cannot be seen from Broad Bay. A large bluff, Grassy Point, lies between Broad Bay and the harbourside settlements of Company Bay and Macandrew Bay to the west. The bluff is skirted by Portobello Road, the road which winds around the southeastern shore of the harbour between inner Dunedin and Portobello, 2 kilometres (1.2 mi) to the northeast of Broad Bay, and by the Otago Harbour Cycleway, which runs alongside it. The Camp Road walking track connects Broad Bay with Larnach Castle, close to the ridge of the peninsula.

Broad Bay is situated on the shore of an aptly named wide bay (Broad Bay) and a smaller bay to the north east (Turnbulls Bay); between these lie a short peninsula (on which is sited the settlement's small historic cemetery), which terminates in the steep, finger-like headland of Yellowhead. The distinctive peak of Harbour Cone forms a backdrop to the settlement as seen from the harbour.

The settlement is home to the heritage-listed Fletcher House, constructed in 1909 and restored in 1992, the first house by Fletcher Construction founder Sir James Fletcher.

Like several settlements on the peninsula - including Portobello and Macandrew Bay, which lies 3 kilometres (1.9 mi) to the southwest - Broad Bay is a commuter settlement and a haven for alternative lifestylers. These settlements have a strong arts community, with many of their residents connected in some way with the visual or performing arts.

== Demographics ==
Historical population of Broad Bay
Year	Pop.	±% p.a.
2006	570	—
2013	555	−0.38%
2018	564	+0.32%

Broad Bay covers 1.63 km^{2} (0.63 sq mi), and is part of the larger Broad Bay-Portobello statistical area.

It had a population of 564 at the 2018 New Zealand census, an increase of 9 people (1.6%) since the 2013 census, and a decrease of 6 people (−1.1%) since the 2006 census. There were 249 households, comprising 282 males and 285 females, giving a sex ratio of 0.99 males per female, with 96 people (17.0%) aged under 15 years, 57 (10.1%) aged 15 to 29, 288 (51.1%) aged 30 to 64, and 120 (21.3%) aged 65 or older.

Ethnicities were 93.6% European/Pākehā, 8.0% Māori, 1.6% Pasifika, 3.7% Asian, and 2.7% other ethnicities. People may identify with more than one ethnicity.

Although some people chose not to answer the census's question about religious affiliation, 66.0% had no religion, 22.3% were Christian, 0.5% had Māori religious beliefs, 0.5% were Buddhist and 3.2% had other religions.

Of those at least 15 years old, 204 (43.6%) people had a bachelor's or higher degree, and 51 (10.9%) people had no formal qualifications. 78 people (16.7%) earned over $70,000 compared to 17.2% nationally. The employment status of those at least 15 was that 216 (46.2%) people were employed full-time, 90 (19.2%) were part-time, and 15 (3.2%) were unemployed.

=== Broad Bay-Portobello statistical area ===
The Broad Bay-Portobello statistical area covers 3.60 km^{2} (1.39 sq mi) and had an estimated population of 1,220 as of June 2025, with a population density of 339 people per km^{2}.

Historical population of the statistical area
Year	Pop.	±% p.a.
2006	1,071	—
2013	1,074	+0.04%
2018	1,155	+1.46%

Broad Bay-Portobello had a population of 1,155 at the 2018 New Zealand census, an increase of 81 people (7.5%) since the 2013 census, and an increase of 84 people (7.8%) since the 2006 census. There were 483 households, comprising 582 males and 573 females, giving a sex ratio of 1.02 males per female. The median age was 47.9 years (compared with 37.4 years nationally), with 204 people (17.7%) aged under 15 years, 117 (10.1%) aged 15 to 29, 597 (51.7%) aged 30 to 64, and 237 (20.5%) aged 65 or older.

Ethnicities were 94.3% European/Pākehā, 10.1% Māori, 2.1% Pasifika, 3.1% Asian, and 1.8% other ethnicities. People may identify with more than one ethnicity.

The percentage of people born overseas was 25.2, compared with 27.1% nationally.

Although some people chose not to answer the census's question about religious affiliation, 66.2% had no religion, 22.9% were Christian, 0.5% had Māori religious beliefs, 0.5% were Buddhist and 3.4% had other religions.

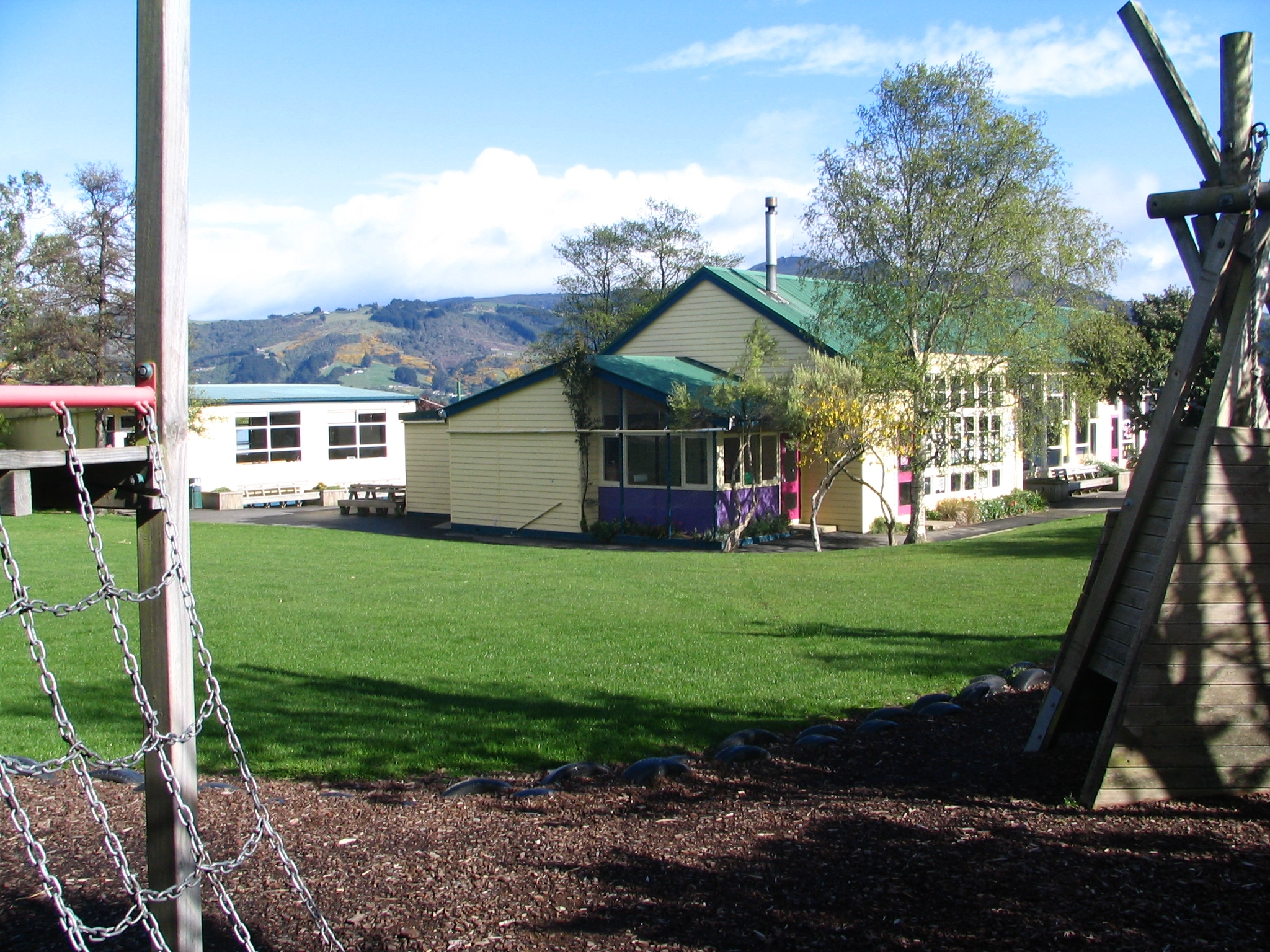
Broad Bay School in 2007

Of those at least 15 years old, 381 (40.1%) people had a bachelor's or higher degree, and 105 (11.0%) people had no formal qualifications. The median income was $34,300, compared with $31,800 nationally. 171 people (18.0%) earned over $70,000 compared to 17.2% nationally. The employment status of those at least 15 was that 459 (48.3%) people were employed full-time, 168 (17.7%) were part-time, and 27 (2.8%) were unemployed.

== Education ==
Broad Bay School is a state co-educational primary school for year 1 to 8 children, with a roll of 15 students as of July 2026. The school opened in 1877.
