= Boulder Beach =

Beach in New Zealand

Coordinates: 45°53′49″S 170°36′45″E

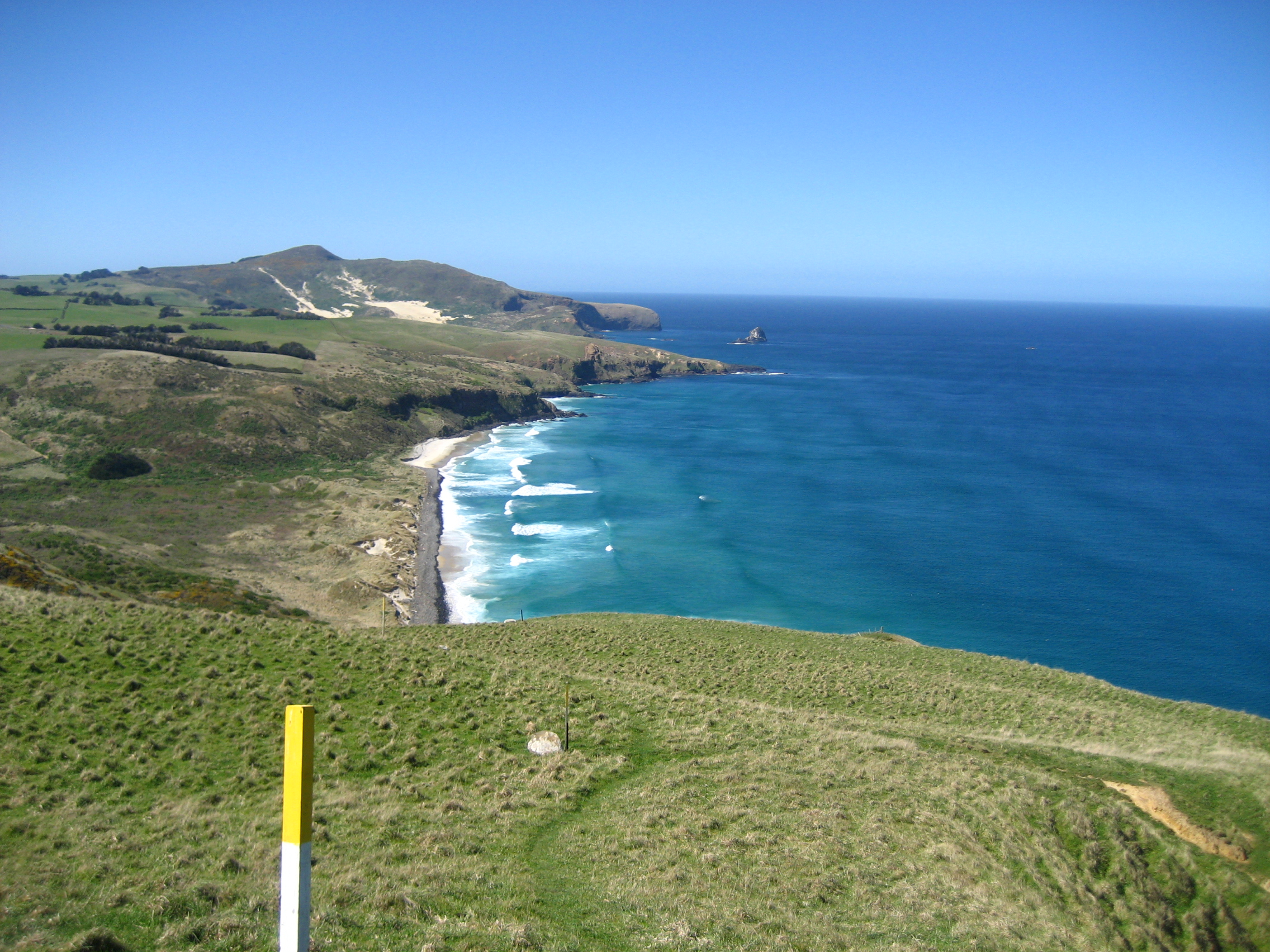
Boulder Beach from Karetai walking track, looking east. The high dunes of Sandfly Bay are visible in the distance (October 2007)

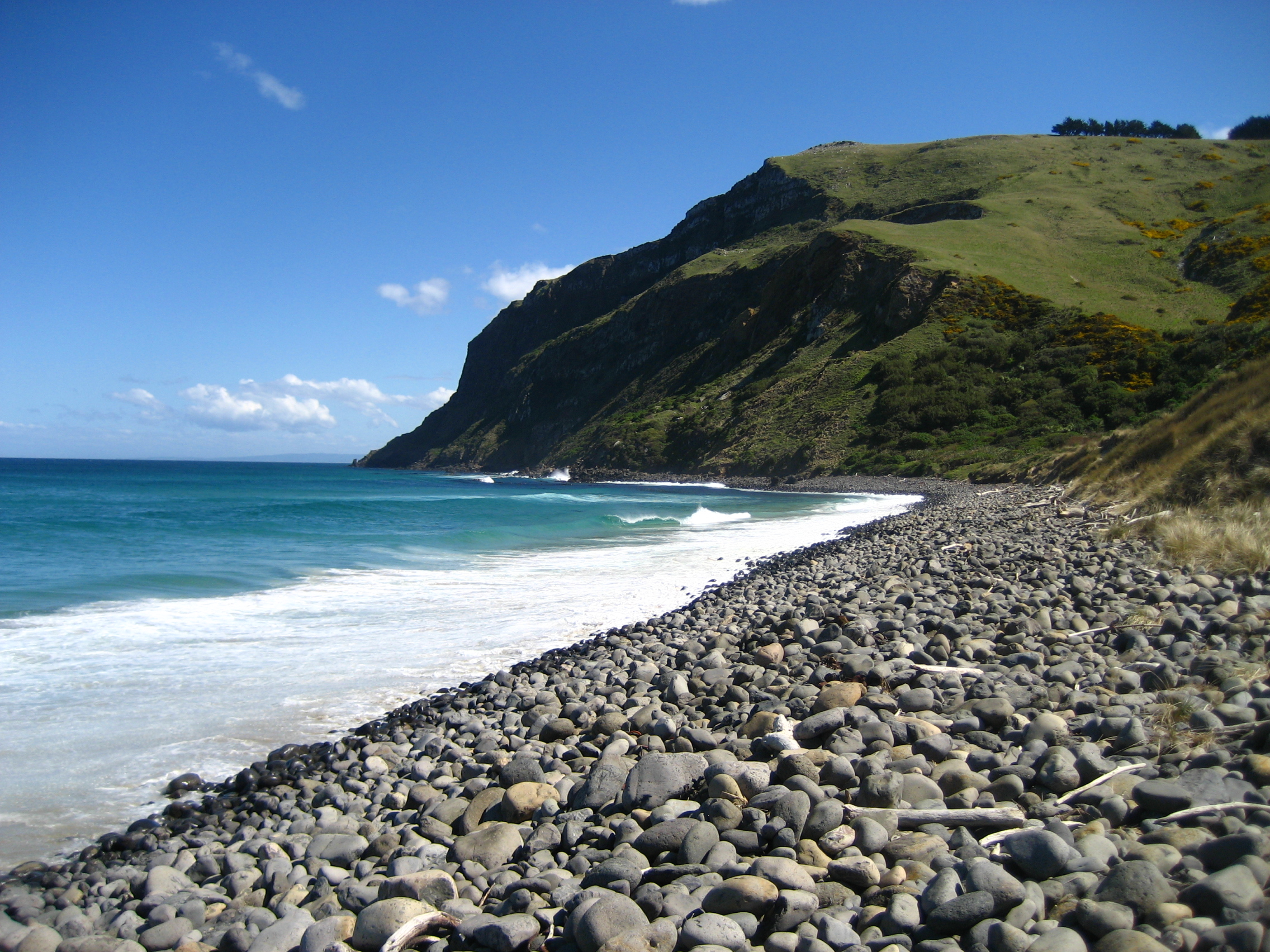
The dark boulders of Boulder Beach (October 2007)

Boulder Beach is a rocky beach on the Pacific Ocean, located on the south side of Otago Peninsula, some 15.7 kilometres (9.8 mi) by road east from central Dunedin, New Zealand. In addition to being relatively difficult to access physically due to the steepness of the surrounding country, it is closed to the public in the summer months (November–February) to protect the yellow-eyed penguins that nest on it.

== Physical geography ==
Boulder Beach is approximately 1 kilometre (0.62 mi) long, facing almost exactly due south. Near the eastern end a stretch of about 200 metres (660 ft) is sandy; the remainder is covered in boulders, hence the beach's name. To the west the beach ends with the rise of Highcliff, for which the neighbouring suburb of Dunedin is named; Highcliff becomes Pudneys Cliff further west, and ends at Māori Head, beyond which lie Smaills Beach and Tomahawk Beach. To the east Boulder Beach is truncated by a series of headlands which culminate in Seal Point, followed by Sandfly Bay. Northward the land rises steeply to Highcliff Hill, Patrons Hill, and Sandymount. A river called Robertsons Creek flows off Sandymount to cross Boulder Beach about halfway along its length. Though the upper areas of the slopes are farmed, the lower parts near the beach itself are scrubby and partly forested.

=== Highcliff Tracks ===
Access to Boulder Beach is via the Highcliff Track system. Highcliff Track begins at the end of McMeeking Road, a side-street off Karetai Road, and follows the contours of the land to meet Braidwood Track, a pedestrian extension of Braidwood Road (itself accessible from Seal Point Road) at Robertsons Creek. Karetai Road and Seal Point Road both meet Highcliff Road at the top of the hill. Boulder Beach Track itself follows Robertsons Creek down to the beach. Alternative access to Highcliff Track can be reached via Buskin Track or Paradise Road Track, both leading down from Highcliff Road.

== Wildlife conservation ==
Boulder Beach is often visited by New Zealand fur seals and New Zealand sea lions. The scrub adjacent to the beach is a favoured nesting spot for yellow-eyed penguins, and since these birds are very shy about nesting or breeding where they may be seen by humans, Boulder Beach Track has been closed to the public during their breeding season since 2005, initially from December to February, but more recently from November to February.

Boulder Beach conservation is administered by the Department of Conservation (DOC) in two blocks: Boulder Beach / Highcliff Block and Boulder Beach / WWF Block.

== Recreational use ==
The Highcliff Track system is popular with trampers, and considered moderately challenging. Boulder Beach is considered a reasonably consistent surfing beach, offering both left- and right-hand waves. It is occasionally used by naturists for nude sunbathing. New Zealand has no official nude beaches, as public nudity is legal on any beach where it is "known to occur".
