= Splendrillia jacula =

Scientific classification
- Kingdom: Animalia
- Phylum: Mollusca
- Class: Gastropoda
- Subclass: Caenogastropoda
- Order: Neogastropoda
- Superfamily: Conoidea
- Family: Drilliidae
- Genus: Splendrillia
- Species: S. jacula

Binomial name
- Splendrillia jacula Dell, 1956

Species of gastropod

Splendrillia jacula is a species of sea snail, a marine gastropod mollusk in the family Drilliidae.

== Description ==
The length of the shell varies between 10 mm and 20 mm.

== Distribution ==
This marine species is endemic to New Zealand and occurs off Otago Peninsula, South Island.
