= Sandfly Bay =

Bay in Otago Region, New Zealand

Coordinates: 45°53′45.71″S 170°38′50.33″E

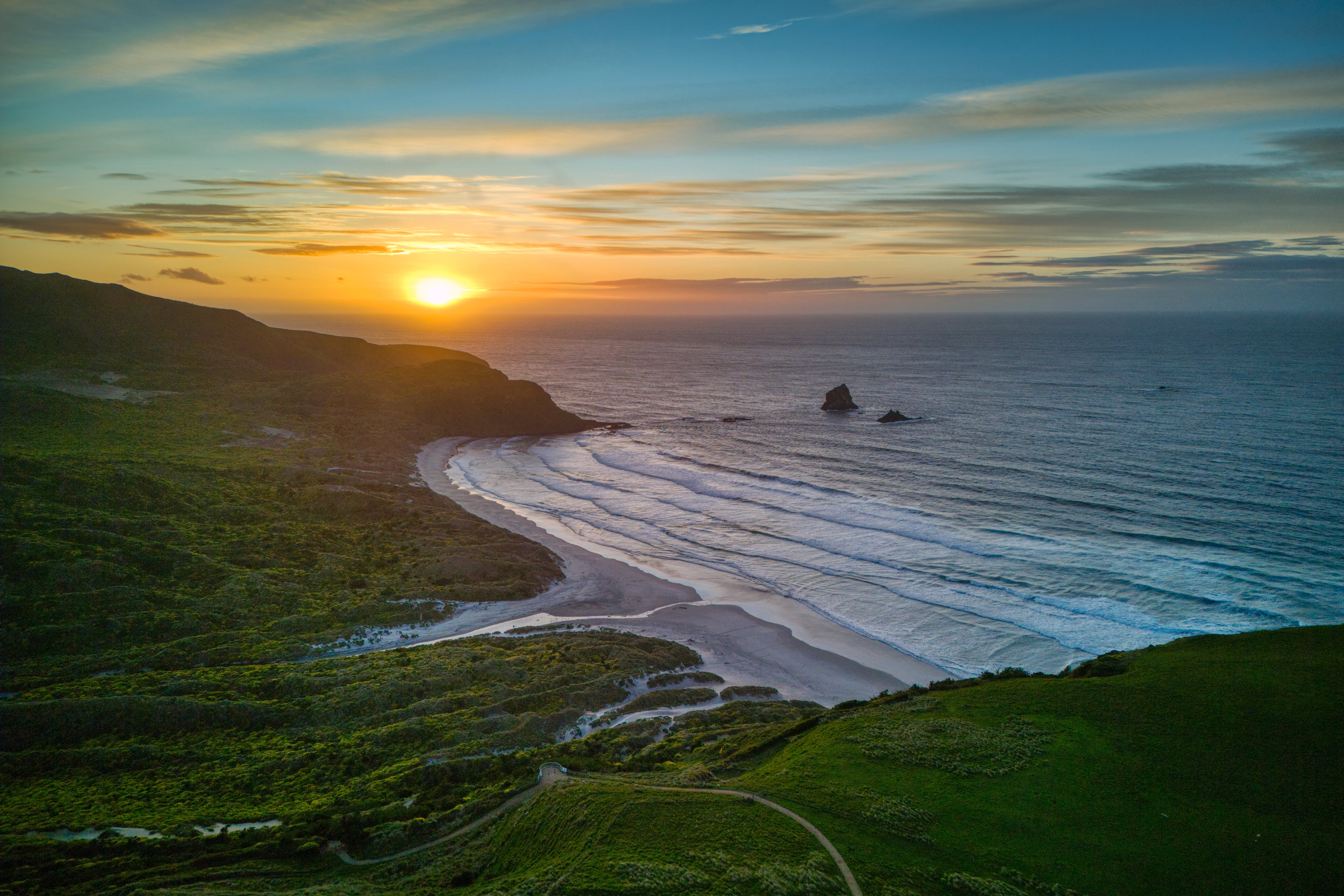
Sandfly Bay from Seal Point Road, looking east. Lion's Head Rock is clearly visible to the right of centre (November, 2024)

Sandfly Bay is a sandy bay with large dunes 15 kilometres (9.3 mi) east of central Dunedin, New Zealand. Located on the southern side of Otago Peninsula, between Seal Point and the Gull Rocks on the western side of Sandymount, Sandfly Bay is a Department of Conservation wildlife reserve frequented by trampers.

== Name ==
The bay is often thought by locals to have been named for a small biting insect known as the sandfly, but this is incorrect. It was named for the sand which, given the windy nature of this coast, flies from the tall dunes surrounding the bay.

== Physical geography ==
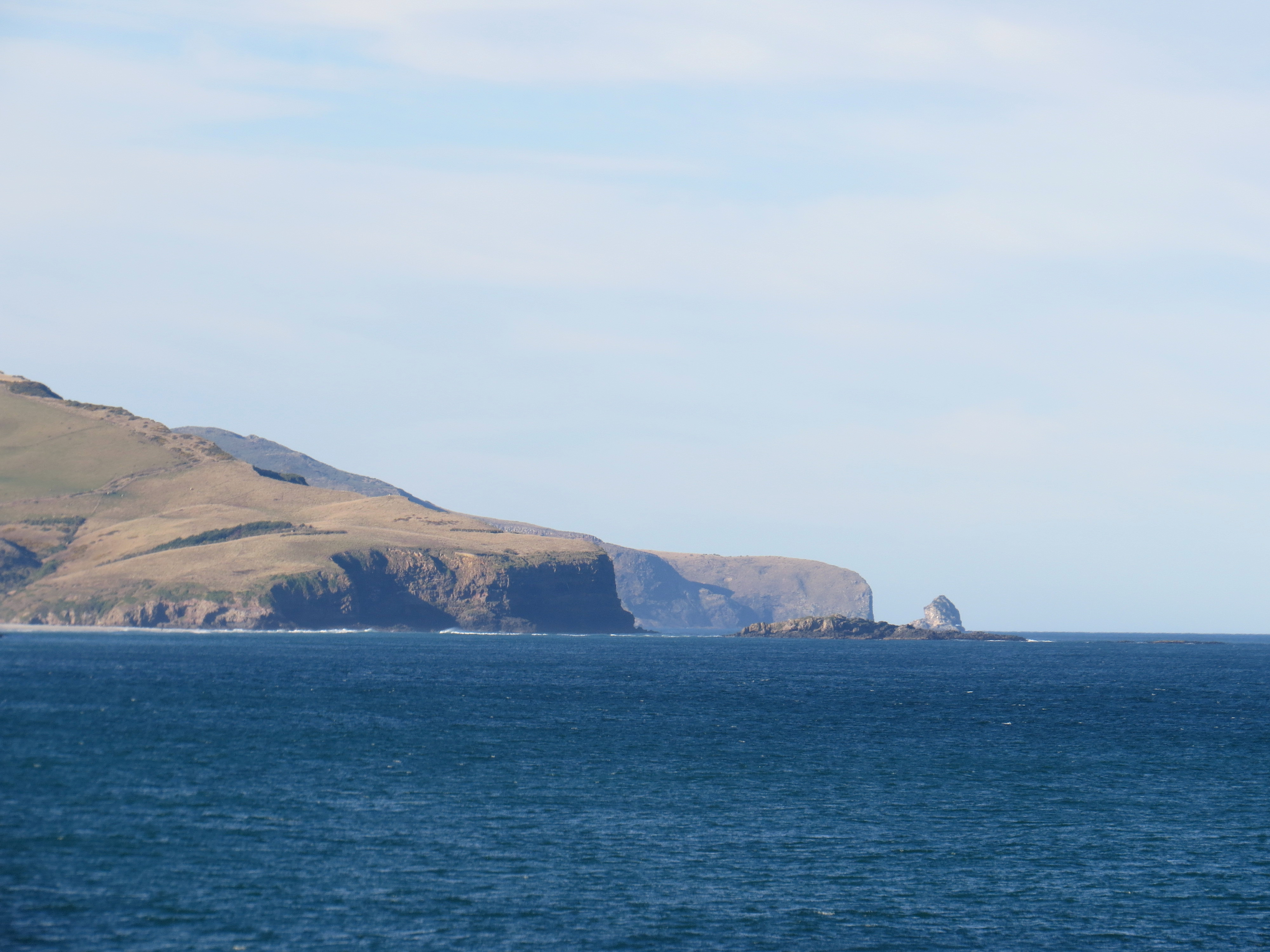
Pacific coast of Otago Peninsula seen from St Clair, New Zealand. Lion's Head Rock is clearly visible behind the long, low-lying form of Bird Island.

Sandfly Bay is approximately 1.5 kilometres (0.93 mi) across when measured in a straight line between the headlands. On the western side the cliffs of Seal Point rise directly out of the sea in a near-straight wall about 900 metres (3,000 ft) long; beyond Seal Point along the coast lies Boulder Beach. On the eastern side lies a 1.1 kilometres (0.68 mi) white sand beach, facing south-southwest, crossed by the mouth of Morris Creek flowing in from the north. Towards the eastern end of the bay the dunes rise to over 100 metres (330 ft) above the shoreline, forming the lower slopes of Sandymount. The beach ends in a rocky headland, with an assortment of small islands known as the Gull Rocks standing out of the sea off its southern point. The largest of these is known as Lion Rock or Lion's Head Rock, due to its shape. A distinctive landmark, it can be clearly seen in good weather from Second Beach, close to Saint Clair, 18 kilometres (11 mi) to the west. East of this headland the Otago Peninsula coastline turns northeastward at Harakeke Point.

The bay is accessible from Seal Point Road or a walking track from Sandymount.

== Wildlife ==
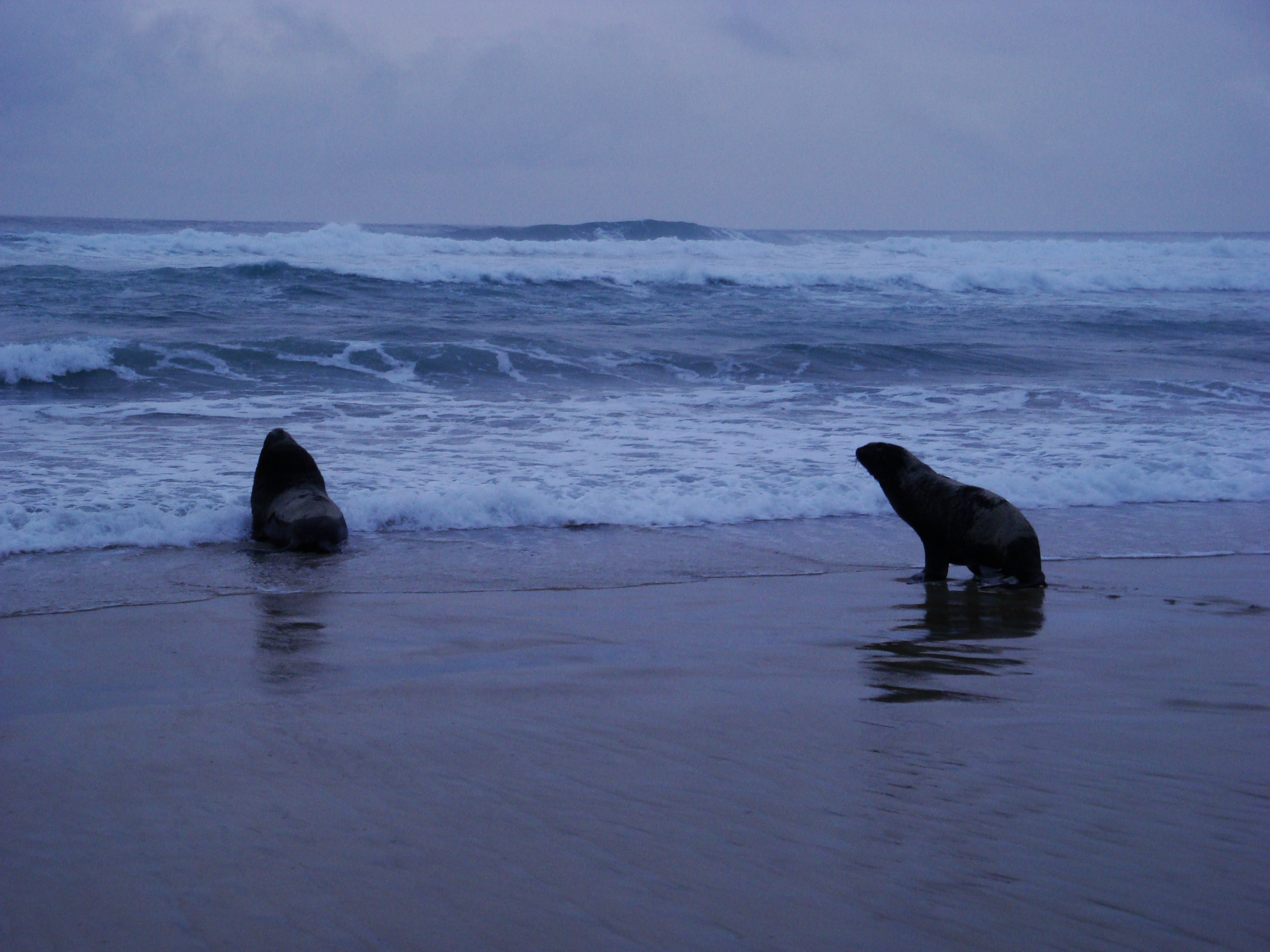
Sea lions in Sandfly Bay

Sandfly Bay hosts a significant colony of yellow-eyed penguins, which are frequently seen emerging from the sea in the evenings. Human visitors are asked to duck down out of sight in the presence of these birds so as not to scare them away from their nests. At the eastern end of the beach the Department of Conservation (DOC) has constructed wooden hides for the public and DOC staff to view penguin activity without disturbance.

The beach is a favourite place for New Zealand sea lions to bask on the sand. The public are urged to stay at least 10–15 metres (33–49 ft) away from these animals and to avoid surrounding them, as they can become aggressive; they can move deceptively quickly and have a much more powerful bite than dogs. Despite these exhortations (which may be enforced by fines under the Marine Mammals Protection Act), visitors to Sandfly Bay frequently approach within unsafe distances of sea lions.

Seabirds such as spotted shags, sooty shearwaters and variable oystercatchers are commonly seen. Sandfly Bay is also an excellent site for washed up Durvillaea antarctica (kelp) to be found.

== Recreational use ==
Sandfly Bay is best known as a tramping site. The main track descends from the Seal Point Road carpark across farmland and down, via a series of viewing platforms and the sandy slope to the beach near the mouth of Morris Creek. Mountain-biking is not permitted on this track. Dogs are not permitted at Sandfly Bay as it is a wildlife reserve.

Alternate access from Sandymount is via a walking track to the top of the dunes and then down the face of the sand. Either route is very much more challenging on the return ascent as the sand dunes are soft and yielding.

Visitors use the beach itself for various sports; a favourite pastime is to ride old skateboards or other flat objects down the sand dunes.

Sandfly Bay is occasionally used by naturists for nude sunbathing. New Zealand has no official nude beaches, as public nudity is legal on any beach where it is "known to occur".
