= Glenfalloch Gardens =

Garden in New Zealand

Coordinates: 45°52′30″S 170°35′10″E

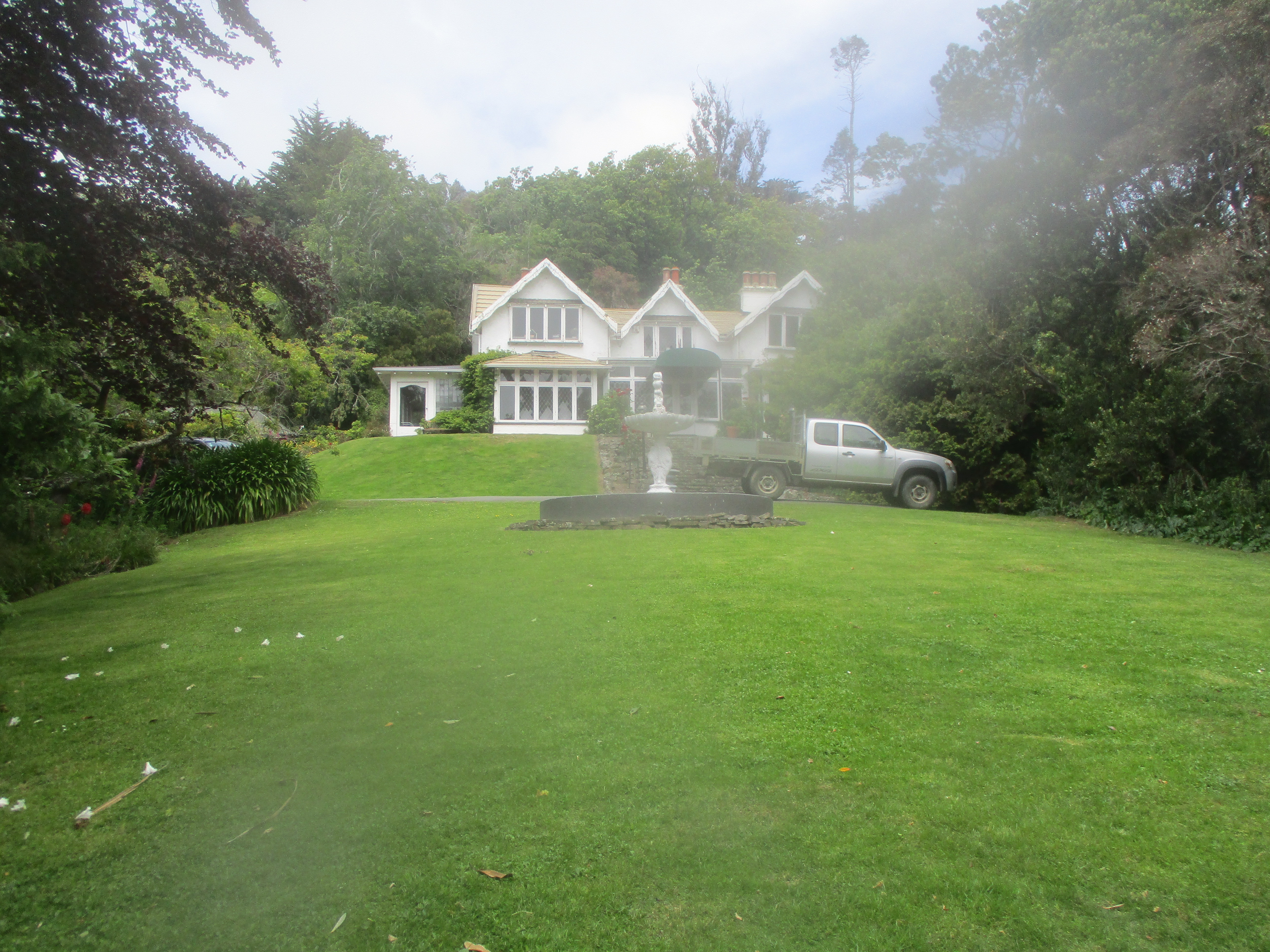
Glenfalloch house and front lawn

Glenfalloch is a private garden and restaurant near Macandrew Bay on Otago Peninsula, New Zealand. The gardens are owned and run by the Otago Peninsula Trust.

Glenfalloch was established in 1871 by George Gray Russell, who bought the land from pioneer settler James Macandrew. It covers 12.1 hectares (30 acres). Russell, a businessman who helped found the National Mortgage & Agency Co Ltd (now part of Fletcher Challenge), set out the gardens and lived at Glenfalloch until 1900. Phillip Barling purchased Glenfalloch in 1917, and the gardens were opened to the public by his son in 1956. The Otago Peninsula Trust purchased the property in the late 1960s.

Glenfalloch's name is Gaelic, and means "hidden valley". The heart of the gardens is a woodland area with native trees dating back prior to the garden's establishment, including one mataī estimated to be 1000 years old, as well as many exotic species planted in the late 19th century by the gardens' first owner. The small Russell Creek runs through the gardens down to an open lawn area around the restaurant and homestead. Many flower species are found in the gardens, with rhododendrons, azaleas, roses, magnolias, and fuchsias dominating. The Homestead is registered as a Category II historic place by Heritage New Zealand, and the Gardens are recognised of being of National Iportance by the New Zealand Gardens Trust.

Glenfalloch is regularly involved in and host of cultural events, including an annual spring festival of art and regular poetry readings. An arts residency aimed at potters and ceramicists is also run by the Otago Peninsula Trust, with the gardens' potters studio and cottage available to the recipient.
