= Sandymount (New Zealand) =

Coordinates: 45.891170°S 170.672385°E

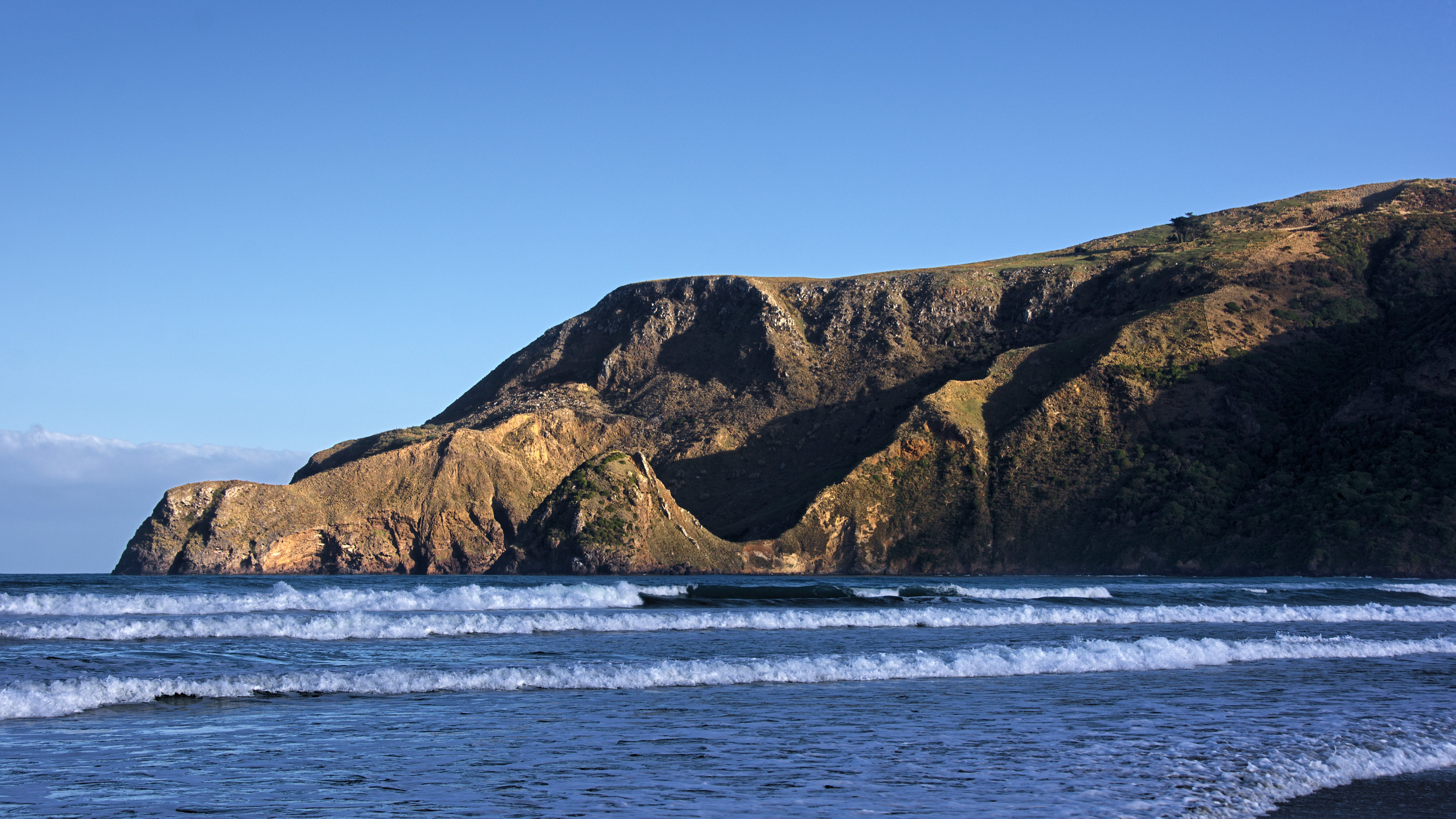
Coastline at Sandymount

Sandymount is a prominent hill on Otago Peninsula, in the southeastern South Island of New Zealand. It is 13 kilometres east of the city centre of Dunedin, close to the northeastern end of Sandfly Bay, and rises to a height of 312 metres. The eastern side of the hill meets the Pacific Ocean in a series of high cliffs and chasms, some of which are among the largest in New Zealand. Prominent among these are Lover's Leap and The Chasm, the former of which is 224 metres high.

The hill is named for the large dunes which rise up the southern flanks of the hill to a height of over 100 metres.

Lovers leap was named following a couple jumping to their deaths naked.
