= Pukehiki =

Coordinates: 45.875741°S 170.622930°E

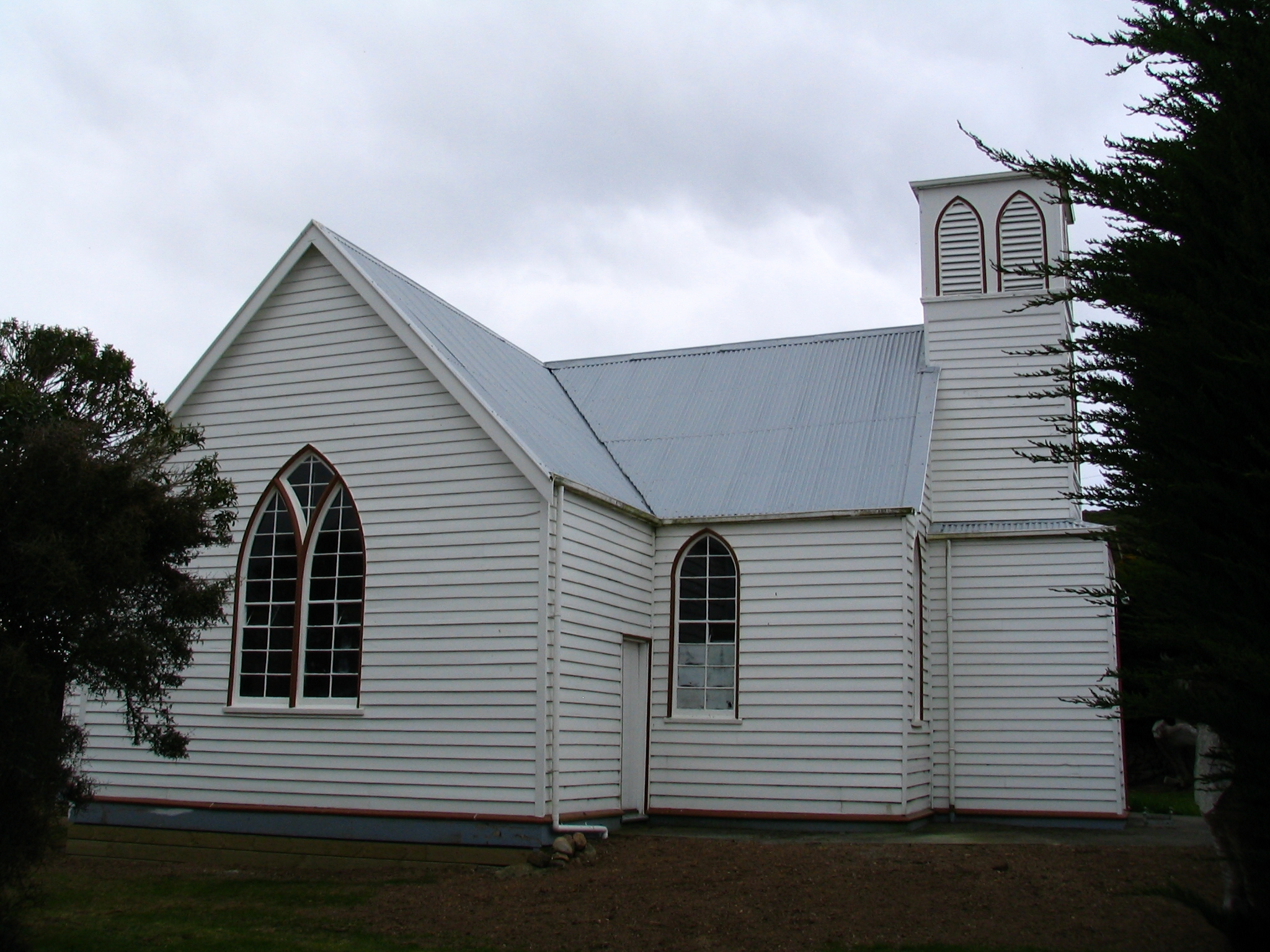
Pukehiki Community Church

Pukehiki is a small locality on the Otago Peninsula, within the city of Dunedin on the South Island of New Zealand. It is located on the ridge which runs along the centre of the peninsula, 8 kilometres (5.0 mi) from Dunedin city centre, at a junction between Highcliff Road, which runs along the peninsula's ridge, and Castlewood Road, which descends to Company Bay on the shore of the Otago Harbour.

Pukehiki has one notable structure, its local church. But it is far more well known for the nearby Larnach Castle, which lies 1.2 kilometres (0.75 mi) to the north on Camp Road, a small road that leads off of Castlewood Road.

From Pukehiki, Highcliff Road continues heading east, eventually reaching the coast at Portobello, New Zealand.
