= Otago Peninsula =

Peninsula in New Zealand

Coordinates: 45°51′30″S 170°39′00″E

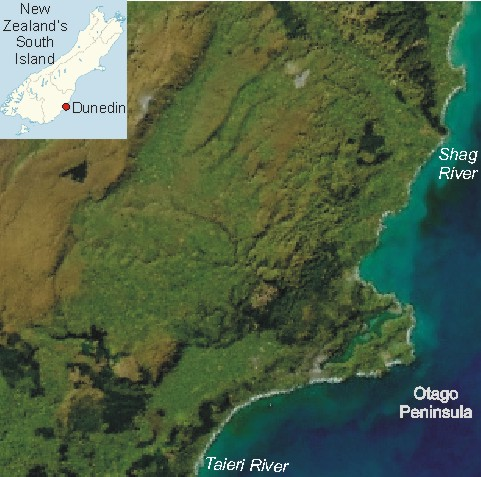
Location of the Otago Peninsula (Muaūpoko) on New Zealand's South Island.

The Otago Peninsula (Māori: Muaūpoko) is a long, hilly indented finger of land that forms the easternmost part of Dunedin, New Zealand. Volcanic in origin, it forms one wall of the eroded valley that now forms Otago Harbour. The peninsula lies southeast of Otago Harbour and runs parallel to the mainland for 20 km, with a maximum width of 9 km. It is joined to the mainland at the south-west end by a narrow isthmus about 1.5 km wide.

The suburbs of Dunedin encroach onto the western end of the peninsula, and seven townships and communities lie along the harbourside shore. The majority of the land is sparsely populated and occupied by steep open pasture. The peninsula is home to many species of wildlife, notably seabirds, pinnipeds, and penguins; several ecotourism businesses operate in the area.

== Geography ==
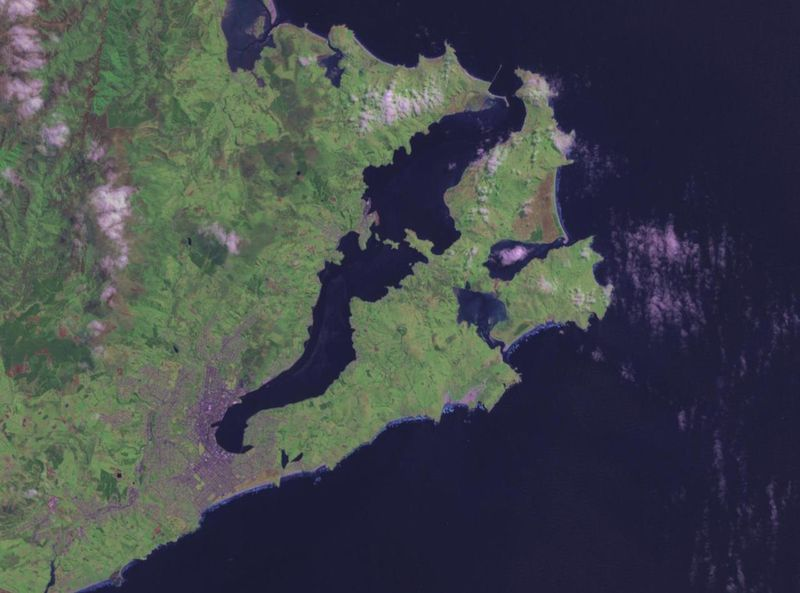
NASA satellite photo of Otago Peninsula and Otago Harbour. The city of Dunedin is located at the isthmus at lower left.

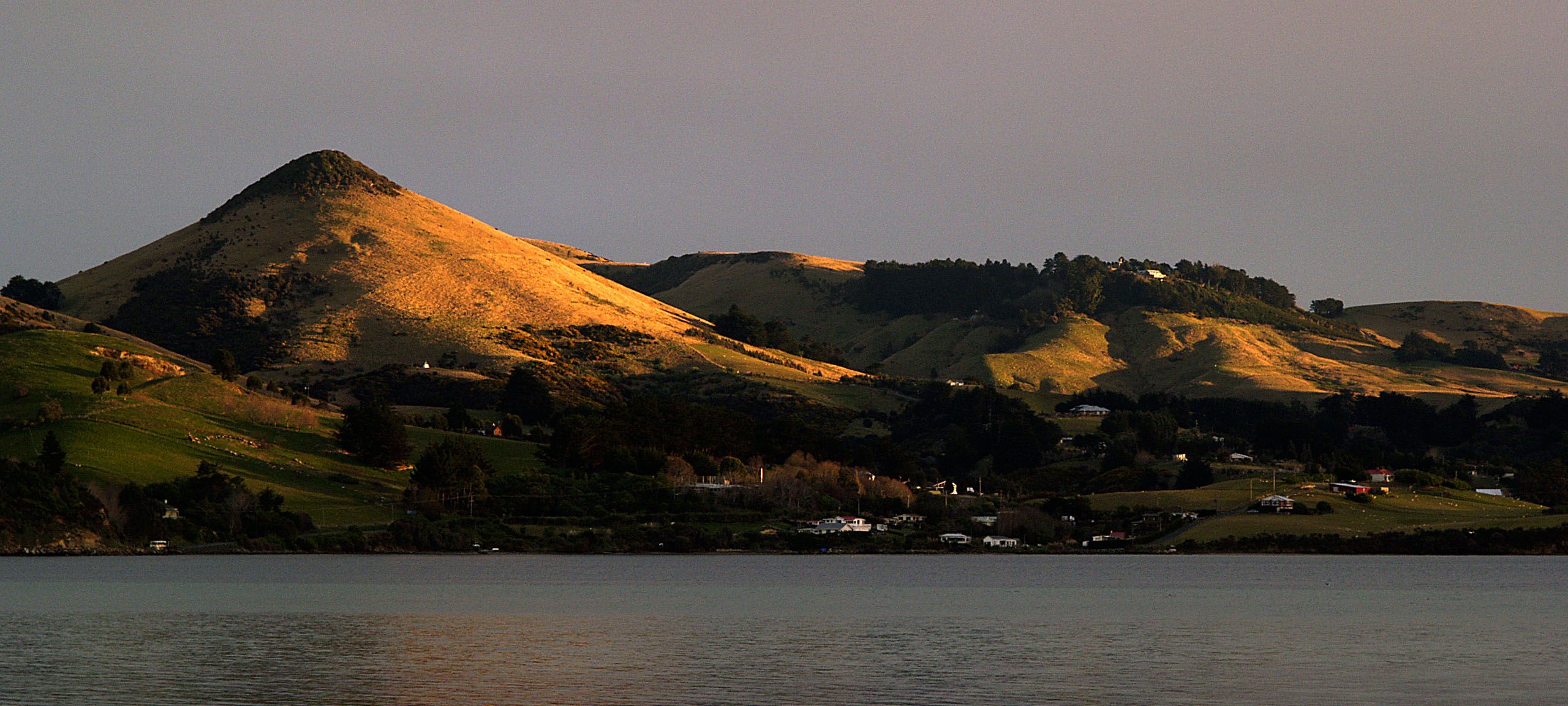
Hereweka / Harbour Cone

The peninsula was formed at the same time as the hills facing it across the harbour, as part of the large, long-extinct Dunedin Volcano. Several of the peninsula's peaks demonstrate these volcanic origins, notably Hereweka which was named 'Harbour Cone' by pākehā settlers. These rocks were built up between 13 and 10 million years ago.

Much of the peninsula is steep hill country, with the highest points being Mount Charles (408m), Highcliff (381m), and Sandymount (320m). Two tidal inlets lie on the Pacific coast of the peninsula: Hoopers Inlet and Papanui Inlet. Between them is the headland of Cape Saunders. Nearby natural features include the 250-metre-high cliffs of Lovers' Leap and The Chasm.

At the entrance to the Otago Harbour, the peninsula rises to Taiaroa Head, home to a breeding colony of northern royal albatross, the only colony of albatross to be found on an inhabited mainland. The viewing centre for the albatross colony is one of the peninsula's main ecotourism attractions, along with other wildlife such as seals and yellow-eyed penguins. Most of the Otago Peninsula is freehold farming land, with increasing numbers of small holdings or lifestyle blocks. Some biodiversity sites such as Taiaroa Head are managed as sanctuaries for wildlife. Many species of seabirds and waders in particular may be found around the tidal inlets, including spoonbills, plovers, and herons.

The Pacific coast of the peninsula includes several beaches that are far away enough from Dunedin to be sparsely populated even in mid-summer. These include Allans Beach, Boulder Beach, Victory Beach, and Sandfly Bay.

Victory Beach, named after the 19th-century shipwreck of the Victory close by, features a rock formation known locally as "The Pyramids" for its resemblance to the ancient Egyptian monuments. Sandfly Bay, named not for the insect but for the sand blown up by the wind, is reached via a path through some of New Zealand's tallest sand dunes, which rise for some 100 metres above the beach.

Other tourist attractions on the peninsula include Larnach Castle, a restored Armstrong disappearing-gun coastal defence post, and a war-memorial cairn. There are views of the city and surrounding country from Highcliff Road, which runs along the spine of the peninsula.

The total population of the peninsula is under 10,000, with about half of these in the suburbs of Dunedin that encroach onto its western end, such as Vauxhall and Shiel Hill. Mostly, only the side adjacent to the Otago Harbour is populated, with several small communities dotting the length of the peninsula. The largest of these are Macandrew Bay (the peninsula's largest settlement, population 1,100), Portobello, and Ōtākou. Ōtākou was the site of the first permanent European settlement on the harbour, and of an early whaling station, commemorated at nearby Weller's Rock. There were several other whaling stations inside the harbour and outer peninsula, including the Middle Fishery Station at Harington Point.

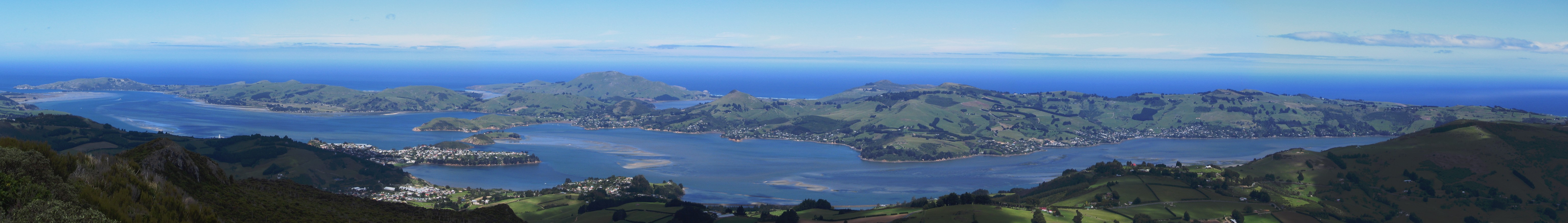
Panorama of Otago Peninsula from Mt. Cargill, looking southeast across Otago Harbour. On the extreme left are the harbour mouth, Aramoana and Taiaroa Head. Near the centre is Harbour Cone, and below it Broad Bay. Portobello and Macandrew Bay are to the left and right respectively. Quarantine Island/Kamau Taurua is mid left above Port Chalmers.

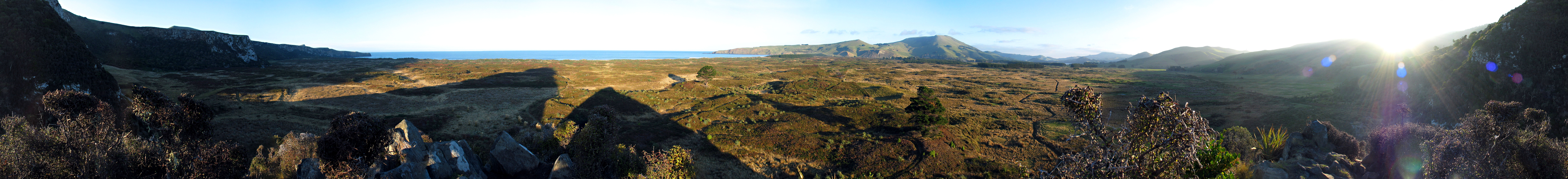
Panorama of the view from the smaller of the two Pyramids on Otago Peninsula.

== History ==
=== Pre-European settlement ===
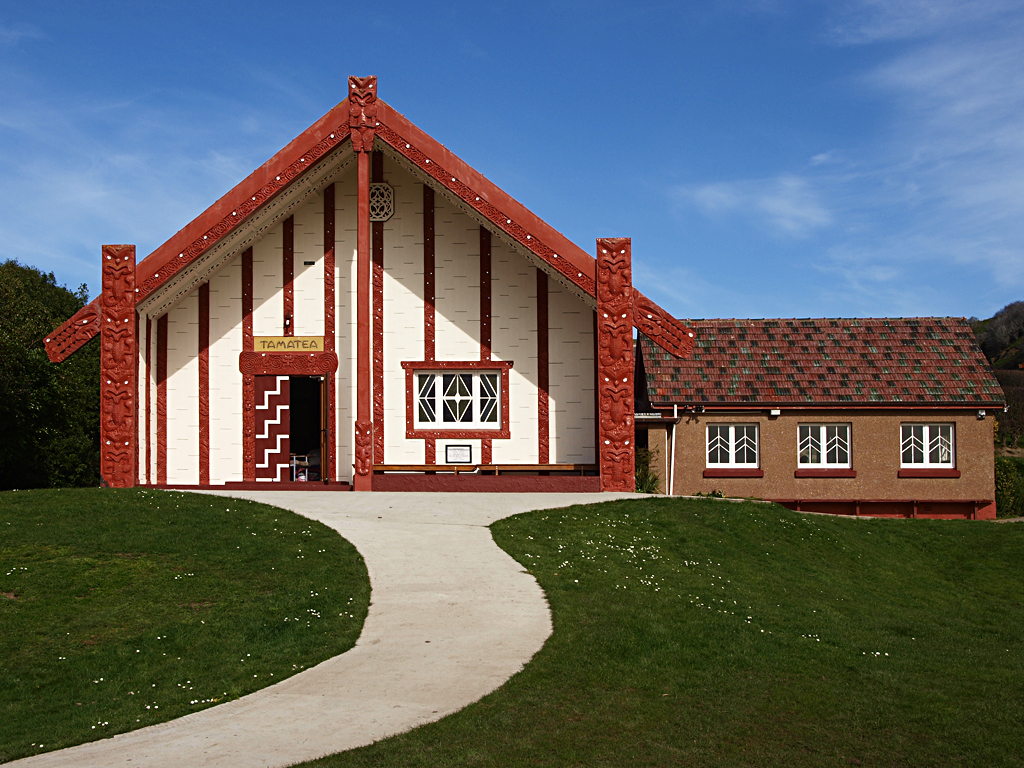
Ōtākou marae whare rūnanga

New Zealand was first settled by humans around 1300 AD, and in the South Island, people concentrated on the east coast. In the Archaic (moa-hunting) period, the Otago Peninsula was a relatively densely occupied area at the centre of the country's most populous region.

A map of recorded Māori archaeological sites for the Otago Conservancy shows many more on the Otago Peninsula than elsewhere in the region. Another showing only those of the Archaic period shows sites clustered on the peninsula and along the coast across the harbour to the west and north. This was one of three clusters on the South Island's south east coast: one from about Oamaru south to Pleasant River; another from Waikouaiti south, including the Otago Peninsula and tailing off near the Kaikorai estuary; another extending south from the Matau river mouth. The clusters contain a few larger sites. On the Otago Peninsula, the cluster at Little Papanui is of middle size while Harwood Township has one of the largest. These and numerous other smaller sites are clearly visible, though often not recognised by visitors for what they are.

Their occupants were Polynesians ancestral to modern Māori, who lived by hunting large birds, notably the now-extinct flightless moa, but also seals and by fishing.

Whale-ivory chevron pendants found at Little Papanui were made by the site's early occupants and are now in the Otago Museum, Dunedin. The site's lowest levels are estimated to have been occupied some time between 1150 and 1300 AD. Another peninsula site, at Papanui Inlet, is thought to have been occupied in the same period, as was the extensive one at Harwood Township. Little Papanui and Harwood are considered to have been permanent settlements, not temporary camps. A single radiocarbon date for Harwood suggests it was also occupied in 1450. Three pounamu adzes, said by H.D. Skinner to be the finest of their type, were found nearby and are dated to the same time. They represent a form already archaic when they were made, and are currently in the Otago Museum.

Southern Māori oral tradition tells of five successively arriving peoples, and while the earliest, Kahui Tipua, appear to be fairy folk, modern anthropological opinion is that they represent historical people who have become semi-legendary. Te Rapuwai were next and seemed to be succeeded by two Waitaha tribes, but it has been suggested this was really one with Waitaha also being used as a catch-all name for all earlier peoples by some later arrivals. Te Rapuwai may perhaps also have been a combinatory name. Nevertheless, some middens, such as those on the peninsula, have traditionally been identified with Te Rapuwai. Waitaha arrived in the south in the 15th century.

Moa and moa hunters went into decline, but a new Classic Māori culture evolved, characterised by the construction of pā. New peoples arrived on the Otago Peninsula, who practised what has been called a foraging economy. Increasing reliance was placed on harvesting the root of the tī kouka tree, and umu tī, cabbage-tree ovens, proliferate over some parts of the Peninsula, showing intensive use of the land.

Kāti Māmoe arrived in the late 16th century. Kāi Tahu came about a hundred years later. Pukekura, a fortress on Taiaroa Head, was built about 1650. Nearby villages on Te Rauone Beach perhaps date from the same time. Pukekura's terraces are still visible, with some of them co-opted into later European defence works.

Many traditions survive from this period concerning figures such as Waitai and Moki II who at different times both lived at Pukekura pā. One of the best known concerns Tarewai, who is difficult to place chronologically, but was of Kāi Tahu descent. He gained possession of Pukekura, was in conflict with Kāti Māmoe at Papanui Inlet, and made a famous escape back into Pukekura by a cliff still known as Tarewai's Leap. There had been an argument about Kāti Māmoe fishing rights on Papanui Inlet. A whale bone fishhook of the 18th century was found there and is now in the Otago Museum.

=== Arrival of the Europeans ===
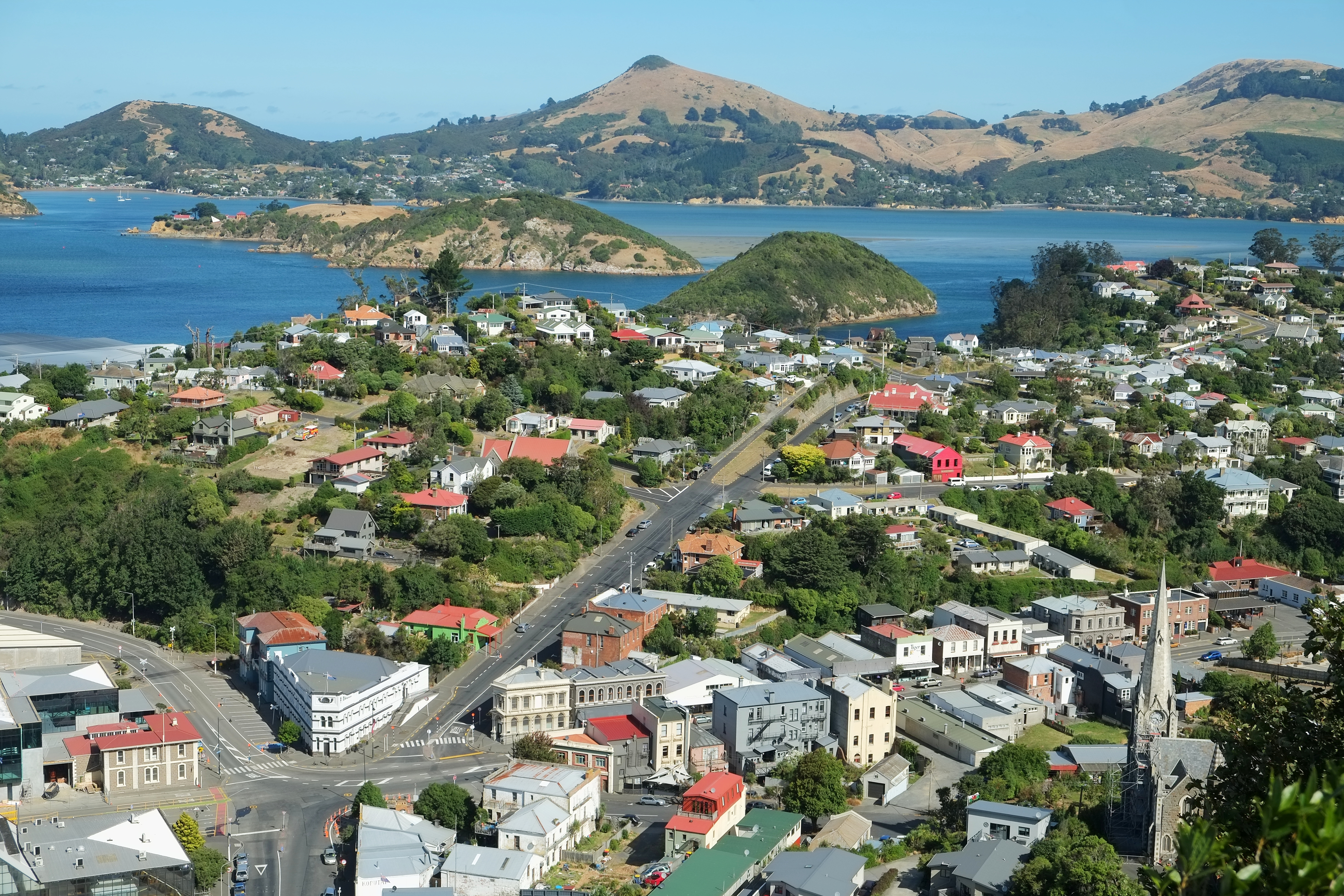
Looking across Port Chalmers and Otago Harbour towards the Otago Peninsula, Harbour Cone at top centre

James Cook sailed past in February 1770 and named Cape Saunders after the Secretary of the Admiralty. His chart showed a bay at Hooper's Inlet, which may have been explored and named by Charles Hooper (chief officer on Daniel Cooper's English sealer, Unity) in the summer of 1808–1809. Sealers began to use the harbour around then, probably anchoring off Wellers' Rock, modern Ōtākou, where there was extensive Māori settlement. Otago Harbour is where the Sealers' War began, sparked by an incident on the Sydney Cove while her men were sealing at Cape Saunders. This led to James Kelly's 1817 attack on "the City of Otago" (probably the Te Rauone settlement(s)), after William Tucker and others were killed at Whareakeake (Murdering Beach) further north. Peace was re-established by 1823. 1826 saw the visit of the Rosanna and the Lambton, ships of the first New Zealand Company. They also brought the first recorded European women to New Zealand, and produced Thomas Shepherd's pictures of the Peninsula. Shepherd's paintings are the oldest known, and are held in the Sydney's Mitchell Library. In November 1831, the Weller brothers, Joseph, George, and Edward, established their whaling station at Wellers' Rock. Throughout the 1830s, their Otago establishment grew to be the largest in the country, and the harbour became an international whaling port. In 1841 Octavius Harwood and C.W. Schultze took over the Wellers' operation.

Conflict with Māori occurred, who suffered epidemics of measles and influenza in 1835 and 1836. Whaling collapsed in 1839, and in March 1840 Dumont D'Urville, a visiting French navigator, described the Peninsula's European and Māori communities as both trafficking in alcohol and sex. In June 1840 the Treaty of Waitangi was signed on the Peninsula, although the South Island had already been annexed by "right of discovery". The first Christian service was preached on the Peninsula later that year at Otago by Bishop Pompallier.

In 1844 the Otago Association negotiated with local Kai Tahu to purchase the Otago Block for its Scottish Free Church settlement. However, at the initial meeting between iwi and agent (the New Zealand Company), the Kai Tahu leaders on 18 June stated their wish to retain the entire peninsula for themselves. But the company's surveyor Frederick Tuckett was reluctant to allow the Kai Tahu to retain militarily strategic land so close to the proposed site of the new settlement, nor allow them to control land on which there were already European settlers, in case they developed a settlement that would compete with that of the Otago Association's. The Kai Tahu negotiators convinced Turkett that while they would give up some of the peninsula, they would not sell the northern portion, as this was where their villages and urupā were. Some chiefs with strong Mamoe connections wanted to retain all of the Peninsula from Puketai (Anderson's Bay) onwards. When William Wakefield of the New Zealand Company arrived on site on 16 July, he was reluctant to accept this. Eventually, to purchase any of the land, Wakefield had to accept the Kai Tahu position. The deed of sale was signed on 31 July 1844 with Kai Tahu retaining 6,665 acres (2,697 ha) of the northern part of the peninsula.

Charles Kettle, the association's surveyor, laid out suburban and country blocks in 1846 and 1847. The arrival of the first migrant ships in early 1848 saw the focus of settlement move to Dunedin while Port Chalmers on the other side of the harbour succeeded Otago as the international port. In December William Cargill, secular leader of the Otago settlement, successfully petitioned the government to re-instate "Otago" as its original name. The old whaling village and adjacent Māori settlements had now become "Otakou".

=== Growth of modern settlement ===
As Dunedin developed, the Peninsula's southern end became a city recreation ground and then a suburb. As increasing numbers of immigrants arrived, settlements were formed on the harbour side and on Highcliff Road on the spine of the land mass. In the early phase of European settlement the more exposed Pacific slopes were also built on.

The discovery of gold in 1861 resulted in a massive rush of people and capital into Otago. Over the next decade, millions of pounds' worth of gold flowed from the diggings, the majority passing through Dunedin. The rapid growth of Dunedin into the most prosperous city in New Zealand stimulated development on the peninsula, as farmers received high prices for many of the goods that they supplied the city with. By 1864, the peninsula's population had grown to 1,269, and 2,425 by 1881. However, the Māori population living on the peninsula had decreased from five or six hundred people in the 1830s, to 22 in 1891. As a result of increased settlement, native bush was cleared over most of the terrain.

In the 1860s, the increased wealth led to pleasure gardens being established at Vauxhall; George Grey Russell built his house at Glenfalloch and William Larnach acquired the land for his big house at Pukehiki, "Larnach Castle".

A lighthouse was built at Taiaroa Head in 1864, and work began using prison labour, to build the winding harbourside road, with its distinctive seawalls of the local stone. Across the cleared land, settlers built dry stone walls, following the pattern of "Galloway Dykes", another conspicuous and distinctive feature of the landscape whose only other examples in New Zealand are across the harbour on the opposite heights. Stone lime kilns were built near Sandymount in 1864.

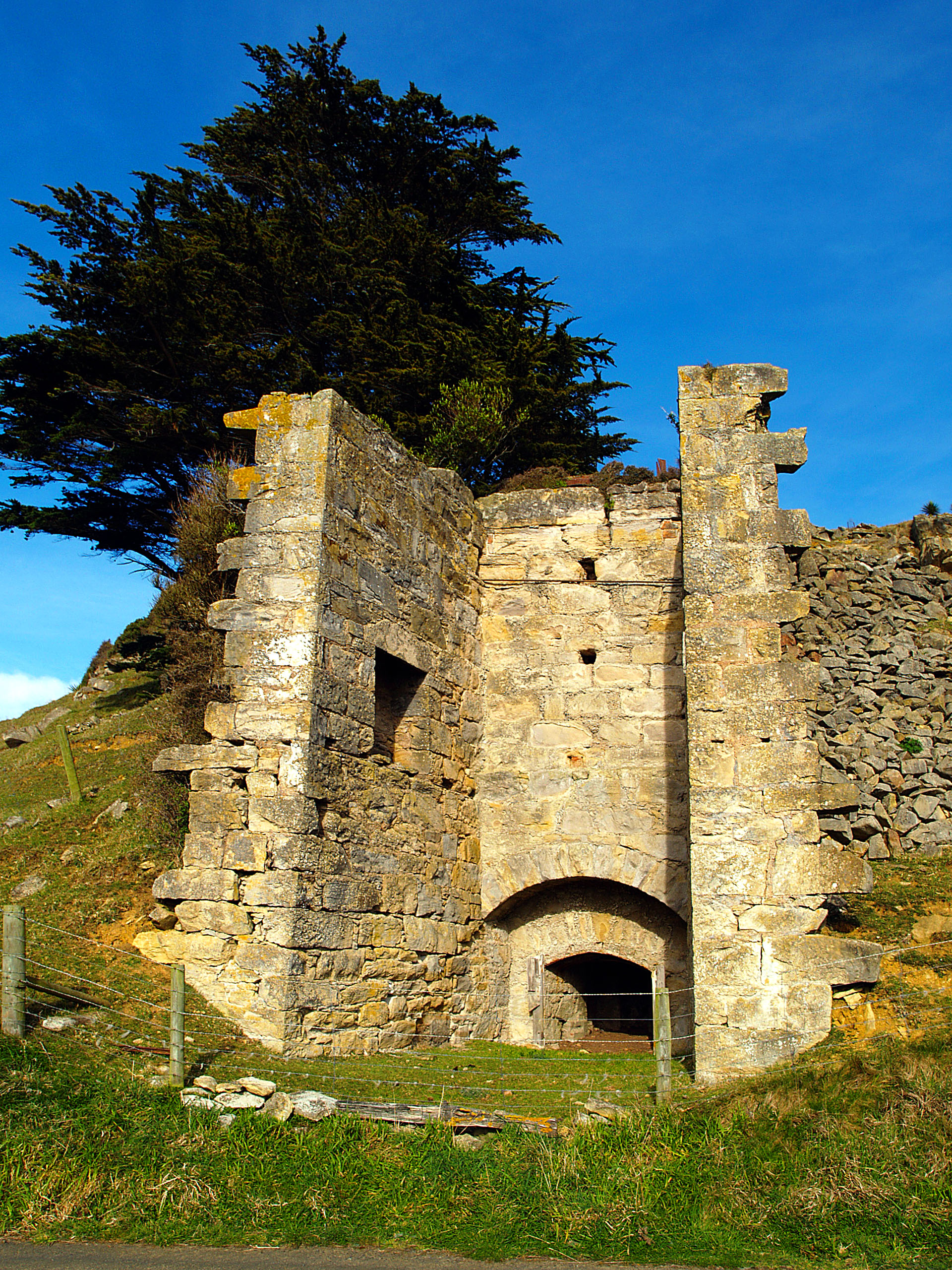
Peninsula lime kiln

By the end of the 1860s, most farms were less than 100 acres (40 ha) in size, with a total of 6,000 acres (2,400 ha) fenced off and growing either crops or livestock. By 1880, about a third of the land area of the peninsula was being farmed (mostly dairy), with the rest still in bush, swamp, or sand. Since the harbour was surrounded by bush-covered hills, with no roads other than bridle tracks, travelling on the harbour offered the most efficient means of transporting passengers and goods between settlements. As settlements developed, jetties were constructed at Andersons Bay, Vauxhall, Waverly, Burns Point, Johnstons, Glenfalloch, Macandrew Bay, Company Bay, Broad Bay, Ross Point, Portobello, Ōtākou, and Harington Point. In 1862, a jetty was constructed at Andersons Bay to service Vauxhall Gardens, a large entertainment venue with gardens, baths, hotel, sports grounds, swings, roundabouts, and a band rotunda. The jetty was used by a number of ferries including the Nugget, Lady of the Lake (in 1864 and 1865), Golden Age (over the summer), Minerva (briefly in 1864), and the Iron Age to being customers to the venue until, following the end of the gold rush, the venture became uneconomic and eventually closed. Roads boards were responsible for the construction of new roads and their maintenance. A road to Andersons Bay and Tomahawk was completed by the winter of 1860, and from there to Highcliff and Portobello by bridle track, which was not suitable for wheeled transport. This led to most settlement being restricted to Andersons Bay, Tomahawk, Portobello, and smaller settlements along the coast where they could be serviced by ferries. Ferry services began in 1859.

A railway was completed to Andersons Bay in 1878, but it never proceeded any further. A causeway was built across Andersons Bay to Vauxhall Corner in 1872. It featured a bridge which could be opened to allow passage for boats.

Following the abolishing of the provincial council in 1876, governance of the peninsula became the responsibility of the Peninsula County Council, whose administrative centre was in Portobello.

By 1878, the bay road had reached Portobello, which allowed a mail coach and later horse-drawn buses to operate along it, while many residents made their way independently by their own private horses and carts. The resulting drop in patronage lead to many ferry services being withdrawn. The improved land connection encouraged the development of settlements at East Harbour (subsequently renamed Macandrew Bay), Company Bay, and Broad Bay.

In the 1880s, following fears of a Russian invasion, Taiaroa Head was extensively fortified. An Armstrong Disappearing gun was installed in 1886. Ferries linked the peninsula's harbour coast with the city and Port Chalmers.

Despite the erosion-prone clay soils and steep slopes, by 1900, 90% of the approximately 200 farmers on the peninsula were engaged in dairying. This led to New Zealand's first dairy co-operative, being established at Springfield on the Highcliff Road in 1871. Once the Taieri and Peninsula Milk Supply Company was established in 1884, most dairy farmers became members, though for a brief period in the late 1880s, milk was shipped across the harbour from Portobello for processing at Sawyers Bay at by Roseville Dairy Company. Between 1891 and 1896, farmers also had the option of supplying the New Zealand Dairy Supply Company, which also operated in the area. The Taieri and Peninsula Milk Supply Company opened a creamery at Sandymount in 1893, and by 1897, additional ones operated at Granton, Papanui Inlet, and Ōtākou. Another opened at Highcliff in 1903. The resulting product was shipped to Dunedin, where it was made into butter. By this time, the peninsula was also supplying the majority of Dunedin's potatoes with approximately 70 farmers around Highcliff and Sandymount engaged in their production. In addition, many Chinese-owned market gardens at Andersons Bay and a smaller number at Portobello (from 1881 onwards) grew a wide range of produce.

The first telephone was installed in Andersons Bay in 1885.

Land clearance continued at pace and by 1915 only 938 acres (380 ha) of bush remained. In 1888, a universally unpopular toll on the low road to Portobello was introduced by the Portobello Road Board to offset its maintenance and development costs. The toll gate was located near Macandrew Bay. During the 1890s, the Portobello Road became popular with cyclists, who lobbied the Road Board to reduce the toll. Cyclists were being charged 5 shillings for the round trip, which had been reduced by 1896 to sixpence on Sundays and reduced further to 1903 to sixpence return and then to threepence in 1904. In 1908, the toll was removed. In 1907, the first automobile was seen on the road, but a bylaw was introduced to ban them until a local referendum held in 1913 overturned it. These actions improved accessibility and reduced the cost of accessing the peninsula, which impacted the ferries.

By 1900, of the peninsula's 24,016 acres (9,719 ha), only approximately 4,000 acres (of which 3,000 was still in bush) had not been occupied by farming activities or urban construction. By that same year, Andersons Bay was becoming a popular place to live, especially with businessmen and professionals, a number of them constructing large homes.

In 1904, a marine fish hatchery was established at Aquarium Point, Portobello. The self-establishment of the royal albatross colony at Taiaroa Head in the 1920s became carefully nurtured for its scientific interest.

Radio masts were built at Highcliff, and rural depopulation was compensated by the growth of the harbourside settlements. Improving roads saw the demise of the ferries.

After World War 2, the Taiaroa Head garrison was withdrawn and the lighthouse automated. The University of Otago took over the hatchery as a research facility, as its commercial purpose waned.

The 20th century saw land use change, as the draining and development of the Taieri Plain eventually led to its eclipsing the Peninsula's dairy production, and mixed farms gave way to extensive grazing. The rural population, especially on the Pacific coast, dwindled, leaving abandoned steadings and roads decaying slowly behind macrocarpa and hawthorn plantings. The re-made, Europeanised landscape in this neglected form was unusual in a recently colonised country like New Zealand. This attracted the attention of visitors and artists. Colin McCahon, New Zealand's most celebrated painter, first worked out his "vision" of the New Zealand landscape with studies of the peninsula, the most developed being that of 1946–49 now owned by the city and on display in the central Dunedin Public Library.

The City of Dunedin absorbed Peninsula County in 1967, promising to extend water and sewerage reticulation.

In recent decades there has been growing suburban occupation of the townships, some "lifestyle" developments on the harbour slopes, and an increasing tourist traffic.

The Otago Peninsula is one of the few places in New Zealand where there is everywhere visible evidence of the long human occupation of the land. Its challenge is to maintain its balance of human and natural in the face of growing residential and tourist development.

== Demographics ==
The statistical area of Otago Peninsula covers 84.96 km^{2} (32.80 sq mi). It includes the southern part of the peninsula east of Ocean Grove, and also Harwood, Ōtākou and Harington Point, but does not include the northern coast of the peninsula, which is covered at Macandrew Bay and Broad Bay. It had an estimated population of 880 as of June 2025, with a population density of 10 people per km^{2}.

Historical population for the statistical area
Year	Pop.	±% p.a.
2006	819	—
2013	780	−0.69%
2018	852	+1.78%

Otago Peninsula had a population of 852 at the 2018 New Zealand census, an increase of 72 people (9.2%) since the 2013 census, and an increase of 33 people (4.0%) since the 2006 census. There were 378 households, comprising 441 males and 411 females, giving a sex ratio of 1.07 males per female. The median age was 52.9 years (compared with 37.4 years nationally), with 126 people (14.8%) aged under 15 years, 87 (10.2%) aged 15 to 29, 444 (52.1%) aged 30 to 64, and 198 (23.2%) aged 65 or older.

Ethnicities were 91.5% European/Pākehā, 16.9% Māori, 0.7% Pasifika, 1.4% Asian, and 1.8% other ethnicities. People may identify with more than one ethnicity.

The percentage of people born overseas was 18.7, compared with 27.1% nationally.

Although some people chose not to answer the census's question about religious affiliation, 64.4% had no religion, 23.6% were Christian, 1.1% were Buddhist, and 2.1% had other religions.

Of those at least 15 years old, 192 (26.4%) people had a bachelor's or higher degree, and 105 (14.5%) people had no formal qualifications. The median income was $25,800, compared with $31,800 nationally. 99 people (13.6%) earned over $70,000 compared to 17.2% nationally. The employment status of those at least 15 was that 312 (43.0%) people were employed full-time, 138 (19.0%) were part-time, and 24 (3.3%) were unemployed.

== Natural history ==
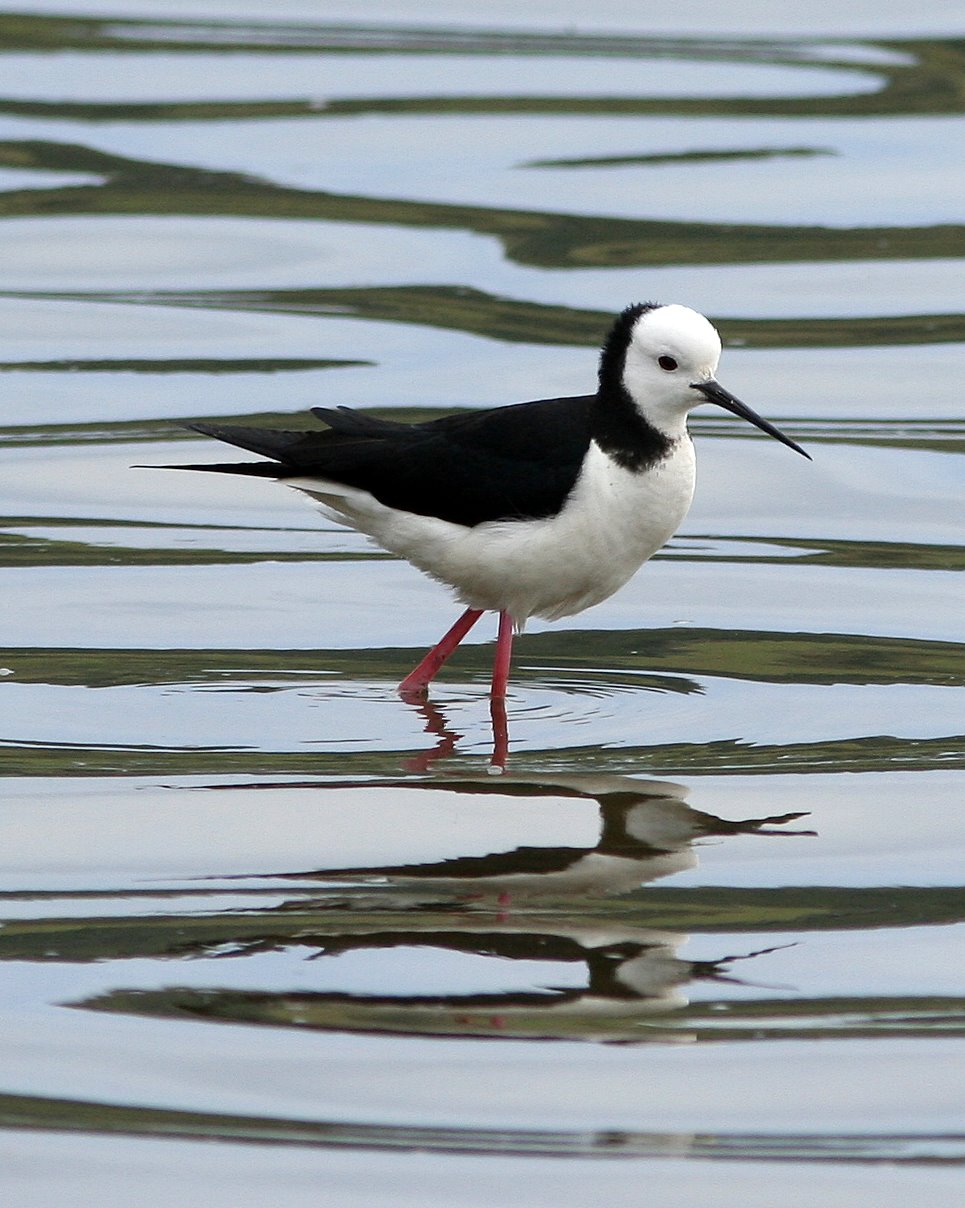
Black-winged stilt on the peninsula

Various species of endemic, rare, and endangered wildlife have been confirmed in the vicinity of Otago Peninsula both on land and at sea. Jewelled geckos are known from the area. Giant moa were historically seen on the peninsula. Endangered ocean megafauna such as basking sharks, great white sharks, and leatherback turtles have been confirmed along Otago coasts.

=== Oceanic birds ===
There is a diversity of flora and fauna on the Otago Peninsula. Birds observed include the endangered yellow-eyed penguin, Megadyptes antipodes, little penguin, shags, and the northern royal albatross. The albatross' breeding colony on Taiaroa Head is the only one in the world close to large-scale human cultivation and habitation. Various species of wading birds also inhabit the peninsula, notably royal spoonbills, which are a common sight around Hooper's Inlet and Papanui Inlet on the peninsula's Pacific coast.

=== Marine mammals ===
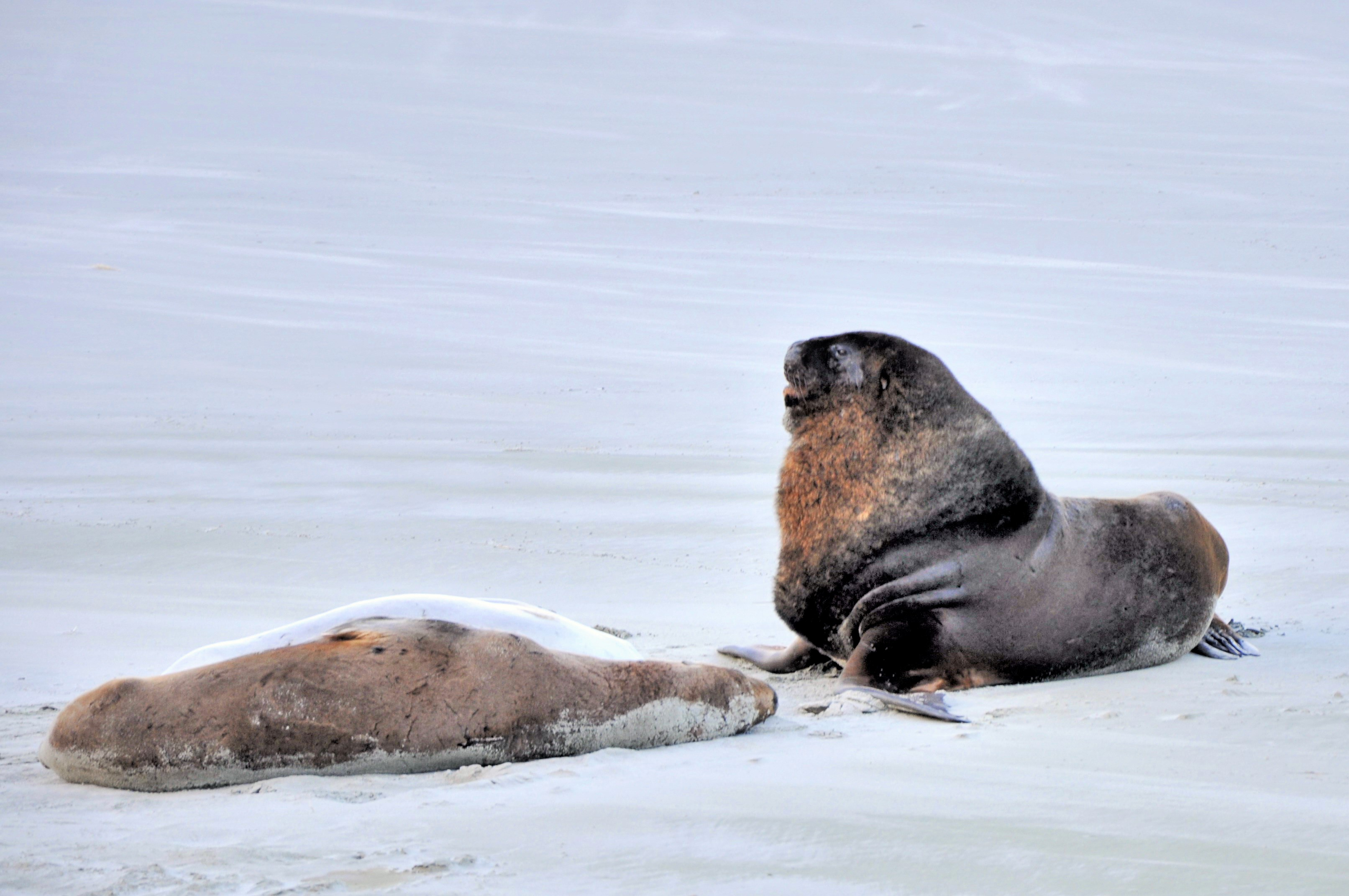
Two sea lions on the beach of Otago Peninsula, New Zealand

Otago Peninsula's coasts are prominent habitats for marine mammals. Seal and sea lion colonies have regenerated during the 20th century after massive exploitation in the 19th century, which almost wiped out both them and whales. Many New Zealand fur seals and Hooker's sea lions currently breed around Taiaroa Head. Otago Peninsula is considered a remarkable and pioneering habitat, especially for sea lions, as it is the only continual breeding ground on a main inhabited island. Southern elephant seals and leopard seals are also known to occur in the area.

Otago Peninsula is regarded as one of the most favoured of habitats for southern right whales on mainland coasts, both currently and historically. In pre-European times, they were frequently seen in the harbour to breed or calve. They were the primary target species for shore-whaling, itself the primary reason for Port Otago. Whales were hunted almost to extinction, and now are seen rarely. Occasionally they are seen in the harbour, but an increase of shipping lanes and accompanying underwater noises may be contributing to their absence. Future studies might be conducted to examine solutions to bring them back into the harbour. Sometimes they can be seen just off the coast in their winter-migration season, along with humpback whales, which were also hunted in the area. Today, quantities of occurrence between these species have become reversed due to drastic difference in biomasses. Taiaroa Head could be the spot with highest possibilities to catch glimpses of these giants. Other baleen whales that have been recently confirmed in the area include blue whales and minke whales. One of the earliest reported specimens of Antarctic minke whale was also taken in this area.

Several species of dolphins and small whales also frequent the peninsula; dusky dolphins and endangered endemic Hector's dolphins form strong connections with the area, while bottlenose dolphins and common dolphins appear less frequently. The outer peninsula just off Taiaroa Head is one of three main congregating areas for dusky dolphins in New Zealand, while the harbour water and the peninsula provides breeding areas and nurseries, and Hector's dolphins frequent the vicinity of the harbour. Orca are also occasionally seen.

Many other oceanic species such as sperm whales, long-finned pilot whales, and several species of beaked whales including Shepherd's beaked whales, and dolphins such as southern right whale dolphins, can be found further offshore around the rich, deep-sea canyon about 20 km off the peninsula coast, and rarely strand. This sea canyon is the only known area in the world with multiple sightings of Shepherd's beaked whales, and its cetacean diversity may be as significant as Kaikōura. In 2023, the sea canyon and the southern coast of the peninsula were designated as new marine reserves.

== Tourist attractions ==
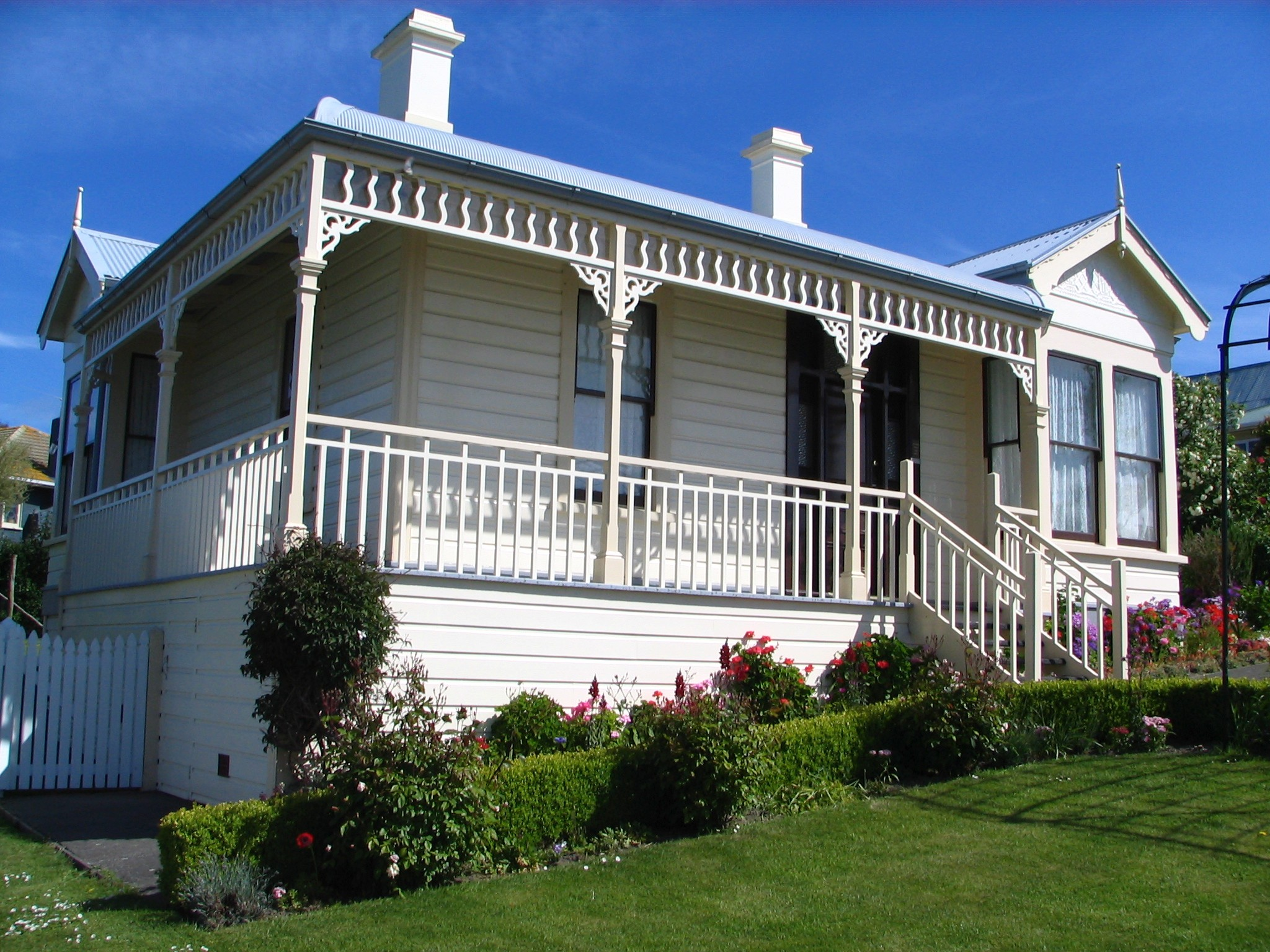
Fletcher House in Broad Bay

- Fletcher House, an Edwardian cottage museum, Broad Bay
- Otago Peninsula Museum & Historical Society Museum, Peninsula social and agricultural history, Portobello
- Glenfalloch Woodland Gardens & Cafe
- Larnach Castle
- Royal Albatross Colony – only mainland colony of albatross in the world
- In 2008, the Dunedin City Council purchased 328 hectares (810 acres) of land surrounding Harbour Cone, a distinctive geological feature on the Otago Peninsula that features early-settler archaeological sites and remnants of bush from pre-colonial times. There are a number of walks to enjoy in this spectacular area.
- A popular walking and cycling track (part of the Otago Harbour Cycleway) runs from the central city along the Peninsula's harbour shore to Portobello. Google Maps does not recognise this as a walking route, but directs pedestrians from the city over to Ocean Grove, and then up Centre Road to Highcliff Road, which runs along the top of the Peninsula. In fact all roads on the Peninsula that are accessible to motorists are also accessible to cyclists and pedestrians.
