= Larnach Castle =

Mock castle in Dunedin, New Zealand

Coordinates: 45.861659°S 170.627214°E

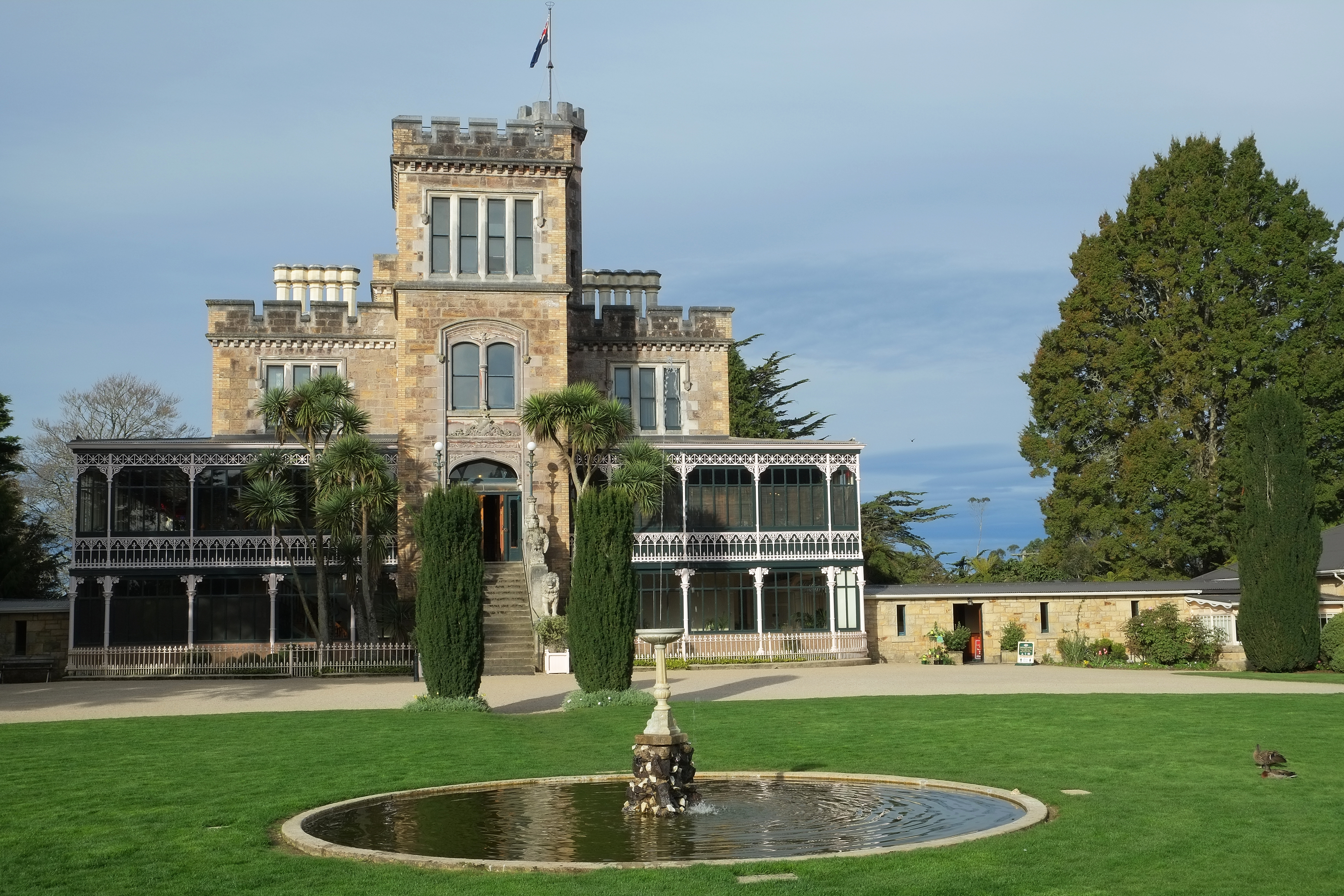

General information
- Architectural style: Gothic Revival
- Location: Dunedin, New Zealand
- Construction started: 1871
- Completed: 1874 (additions until 1887)
- Owner: Barker Family

Design and construction
- Architect: R. A. Lawson
- Designations: Garden of International Significance Qualmark Endorsed Activity
- Known for: Tourism Destination

Website
- Larnach Castle www.larnachcastle.co.nz Camp Estate www.campestate.co.nz

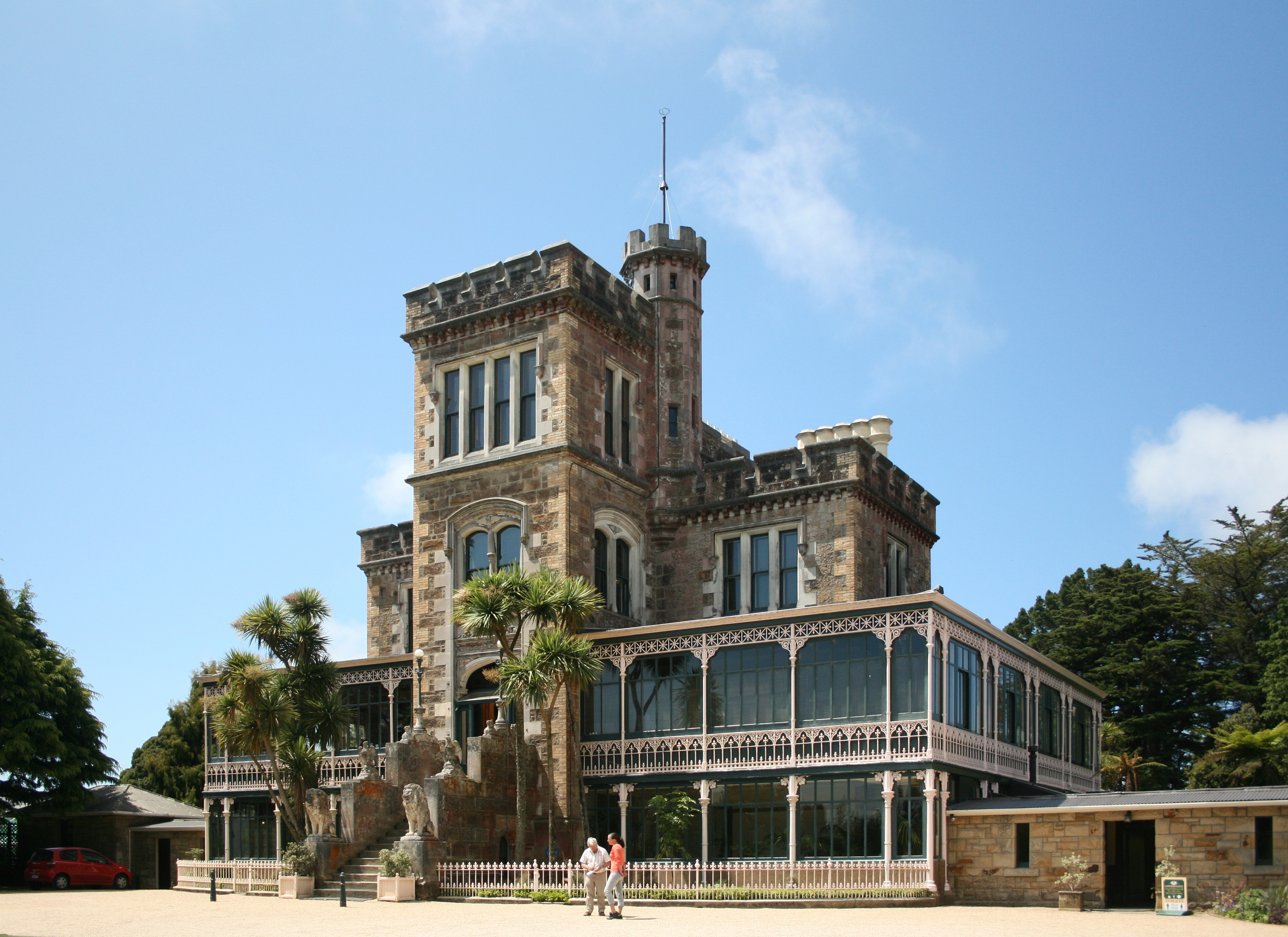
The principal facade

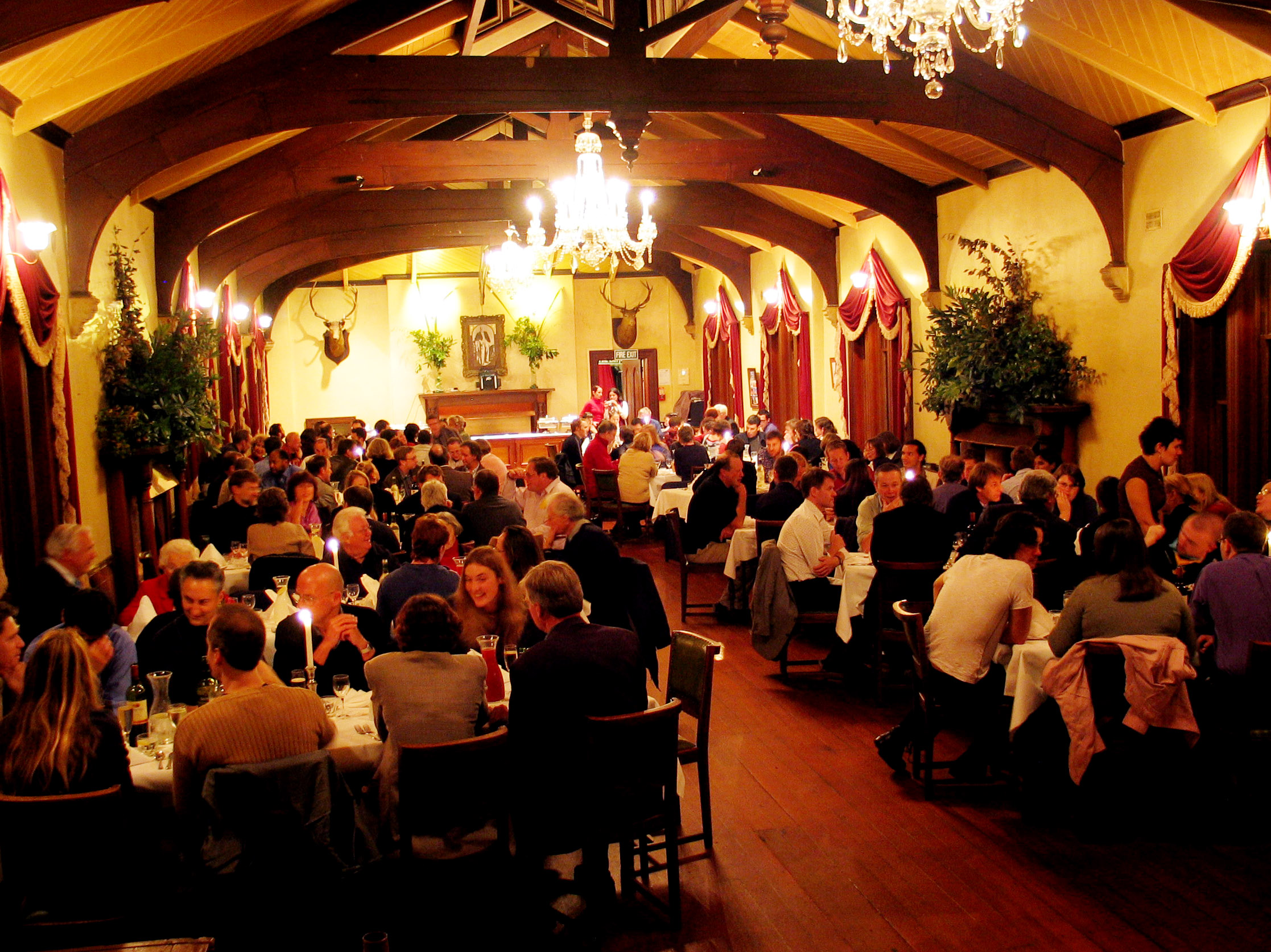
Inside the ballroom

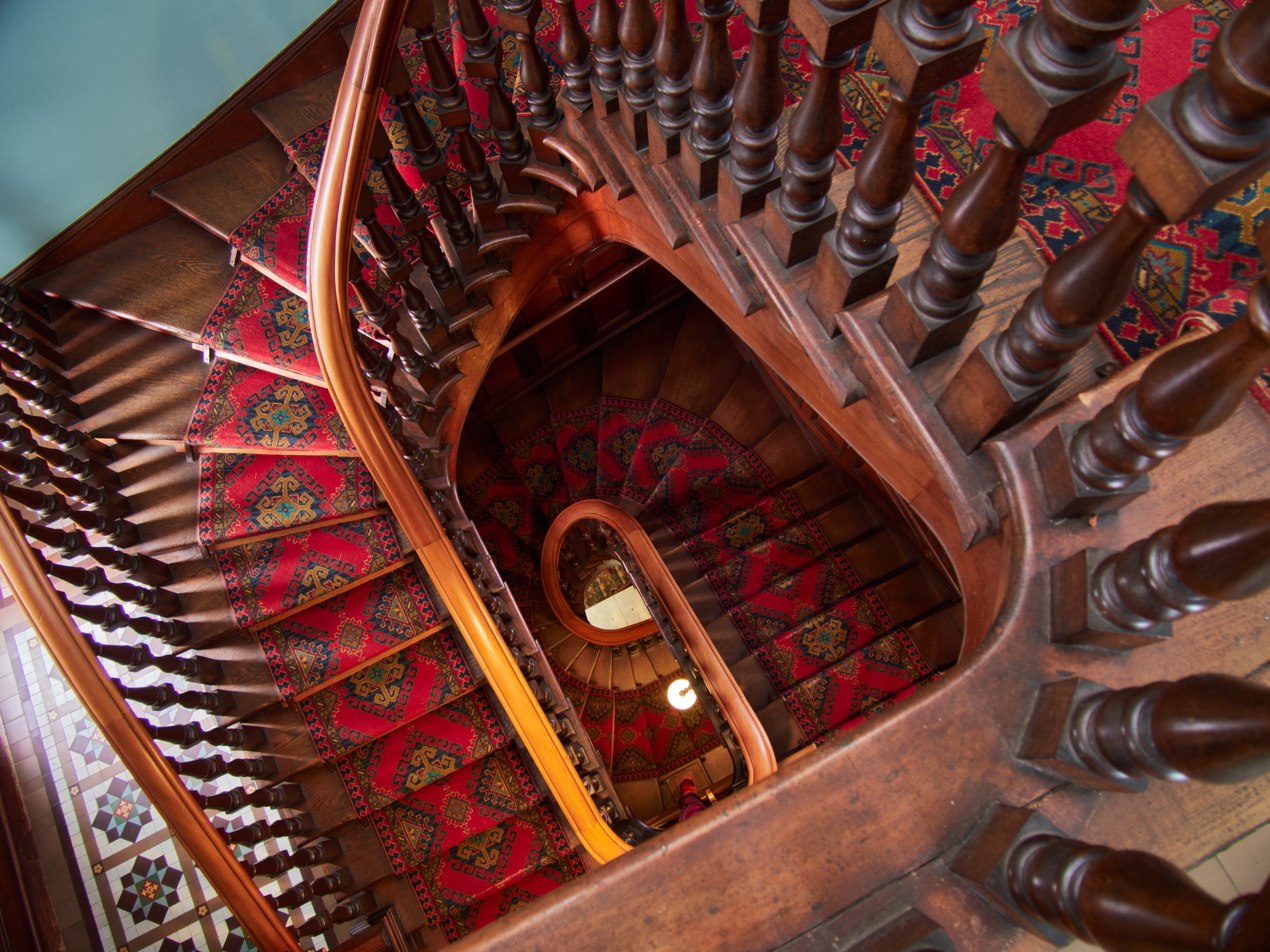
Grand staircase

Larnach Castle (also referred to as "Larnach's Castle") is a mock castle on the ridge of the Otago Peninsula within the limits of the city of Dunedin, New Zealand, close to the small settlement of Pukehiki. It is one of a few houses of this scale in New Zealand. The house was built by the prominent entrepreneur and politician, William Larnach. Since 1967, the castle has been privately owned by the Barker family, and opened as a tourist attraction, as "New Zealand's only castle".

The castle and grounds are open daily to members of the public. The Larnach Castle gardens are one of only five gardens nationwide to have been given the rating of "Garden of International Significance" by the New Zealand Gardens Trust. These were the first gardens in the South Island to receive the title. In 2018, Larnach Castle was designated a New Zealand Landmark by Heritage New Zealand.

== History ==
=== Construction and style ===
Larnach Castle was built as the private residence of William James Mudie Larnach. Land for the construction of Larnach Castle was purchased in 1870, and prominent Dunedin architect R.A. Lawson was selected to design the Gothic Revival mansion. The site was clear-felled and levelled, allowing construction to begin in 1871. To level the construction site, workers jammed pegs into the layers of volcanic rock before pouring cold salt water to split the surface. Approximately 200 workmen were used to complete the main structure, using imported materials from around the world. Much of the stone used for the Castle came from a basalt quarry nearby. Other materials included yellow brick, Glasgow brick, Oamaru stone, Port Chalmers basalt, Cornwall blackstone, Italian marble, Marseilles cobbles, Catlins timber, North Island Kauri and local Caversham sandstone for the ballroom. The Godfrey family carved many of the building's intricate ceilings; a single ceiling in the main foyer took six and half years to complete. In 1875, twenty tonne of glass was imported from Venice, in an effort to enclose exposed verandahs unsuitable for Dunedin winters. The addition of the 3000 square foot ballroom was completed in 1887 as a 21st birthday present for Larnach's eldest daughter Kate. The resulting complex eventually contained 43 rooms and required a staff of 46 servants. The complex included 35 acres reserved for grounds, including a vinery, and a home farm of 300 acres with its own farmstead including a cow byre for 300 cows, stables, and quarters for farm workers.

=== Home of the Larnach family ===
The building, which Larnach himself simply called "The Camp", was coined a "castle" by local press on 8 December 1874, a few days after William and wife Eliza moved in. After a series of personal and financial setbacks he died by suicide in New Zealand's Parliament Buildings in October 1898. Following bitter legal battles over Larnach's will, the Larnach family sold the house in 1906.

=== Reputation as haunted house ===
Larnach Castle has a reputation as one of New Zealand's most haunted buildings, with accounts of sightings of the ghost of a bearded Victorian gentleman (presumably Larnach himself), unexplained smells of cigar smoke and port in unoccupied rooms, and visitors and workers at the castle feeling as if they have been suddenly pushed in the back. These tales have drawn paranormal investigators from both New Zealand and overseas, with the location appearing on various "ghost hunter" television programmes from both New Zealand and the United States.

== Modern history ==
=== Restoration ===
Throughout the twentieth century Larnach Castle went through constant changes of ownership and usage. The building fell into disrepair, and in 1967 was bought by Barry and Margaret Barker. Norcombe Barker became Larnach Castle Executive Director in 1990. Significant restoration work has since been carried out by the Barker family, along with retrieval of original furniture to refurnish the house. The gardens, which were not an original feature of William Larnach's home, have been awarded "Garden of International Significance" status by the New Zealand Gardens Trust. Funded by its tourism operation, upkeep of the building is a continuous operation—in 2015 the music room underwent a $100,000 refurbishment.

In 2013, a direct descendant of William Larnach was proposed to by her spouse at the Castle.

=== Tourism ===
Larnach Castle operates as a significant tourist attraction in Dunedin, receiving approximately 120,000 guests per annum. The castle is open to the public 365 days a year; offering guided and self-guided tours, events and accommodation. The Castle regularly hosts in-house events; notably their annual Winter Ball. Larnach Castle Ltd operates three accommodation types; Larnach Castle Stables, Larnach Castle Lodge and the nearby luxury accommodation Camp Estate. Guests staying in accommodation are offered the opportunity to dine inside the Castle.

=== Appearances ===
In 1985 it was used as a location for the filming of the TVNZ Dunedin production Hanlon. The same year, it was used in the introductory scenes in the US-New Zealand film co-production, Shaker Run.

In 1994, a play about the Larnach family tragedies, titled Castle of Lies, was performed by Dunedin's Fortune Theatre before 100 invited guests in the castle ballroom.

Larnach Castle and the Camp Estate were used as locations for the 2022 Netflix film, The Royal Treatment. They represented the residence of the royal family of the fictional country Lavania.

The building has been visited by paranormal investigators and featured on local New Zealand television shows such as Ghost Hunt and Spookers as well as international television shows such as the American Ghost Hunters International.

== See also ==
- William Larnach
- R.A. Lawson
- History of Dunedin
