= Green Island (Ōkaihae) =

Island in New Zealand

Coordinates: 45°57′11″S 170°23′14″E

Māori: Ōkaihae

Geography
- Location: Dunedin, Otago region
- Area: 0.04 km^{2} (0.015 sq mi)
- Length: 0.3 km (0.19 mi)
- Width: 0.2 km (0.12 mi)
- Highest elevation: 42 m (138 ft)

Administration
- New Zealand

Demographics
- Population: Uninhabited

Green Island is a small, uninhabited island lying 2 km off the coast of the Otago region of New Zealand, some 13 km south-west of the city of Dunedin. The island's Māori name is Ōkaihae.

== History ==
Green Island may be the 'Isle of Wight' where the Sydney sealer Brothers, chartered by Robert Campbell and sailing under Robert Mason, dropped eight men of a gang of eleven in November 1809. William Tucker, who later settled at Whareakeake (Murdering Beach) near Otago Heads, was in the gang. Alternatively the 'Isle of Wight' may be Taieri Island, a few kilometres to the south. It has also been suggested that, alternatively, Green Island may be the 'Ragged Rock' where the other three men of the Brothers gang were landed. Some of the men claimed to have stayed on these two islands from 9 November 1809 until 20 December 1810.

Green Island used to be called St Michael's Mount, suggesting it had been named after the island of that name off the Cornish coast. It is more likely it was so named after Tommy Chaseland's mother ship the St Michael when he was sealing there in the 1820s. He told Edward Shortland he lost a boat and all its hands when it was dashed on the island while trying to land. He stayed alone overnight and was picked up by another boat the following day.

In the 1880s the island was mined for guano, bird dung used as fertiliser.

== Important Bird Area ==
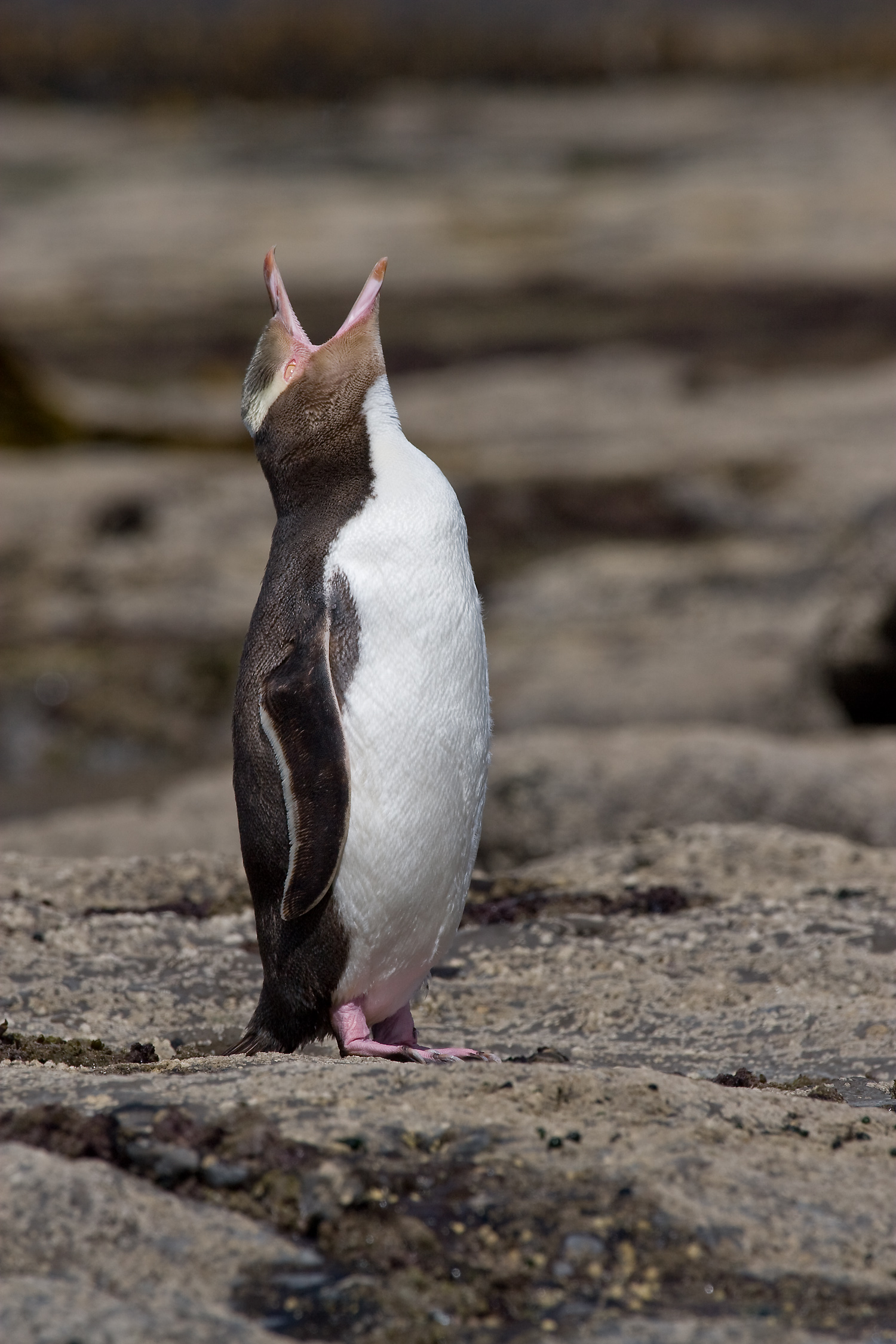
The island is a nesting site of yellow-eyed penguins

The island has been identified as an Important Bird Area by BirdLife International because it is home to breeding colonies of yellow-eyed penguins and bronze shags.

== Legacy ==
The uncleared native forest on the island lends its name to similar "Green Island" native forest on the nearby mainland. In turn, the name has been applied to Green Island, a community in the territorial authority called Dunedin City.

== See also ==
- List of islands of New Zealand
- List of islands
- Desert island
