= Barnet Burns =

English sailor (c.1807–1860)

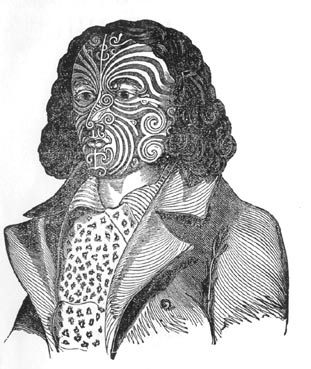
- Barnet Burns (from his book)
- Born: c.1807
- Died: 26 December 1860; East Stonehouse, England (now Plymouth, England)
- Education: Lancasterian School
- Occupations: Sailor; trader; showman
- Spouses: Te Amotawa; Bridget Cain; Anne Boval; Mrs Rosina Crowther
- Children: 5

Barnet Burns (c. 1807 – 26 December 1860) was an English sailor, trader, and showman who became one of the first Europeans to live as a Pākehā Māori and to receive the full moko. He travelled to Australia and found employment as a trader of flax in New Zealand in the 1830s. Burns returned to Europe in 1835 and spent most of his remaining years as a showman giving lectures, where he described the customs of the Māori, performed the haka, exhibited his Māori tattoos and recounted his adventures in New Zealand.

== Early life ==
George Burns, later known as Barnet, was believed to have been born about 1807, but the exact location of his birth has yet to be determined.

At the age of 13 or 14 he became a cabin boy and ended up working for Louis Celeste Lecesne in Jamaica. When Lecesne travelled to England to petition parliament over his false arrest and exile, Burns travelled with him. Under the patronage of Lecesne, Burns went to the Lancasterian school at Borough Road in London.

Burns again set sail in 1827 on the brig Wilna and arrived at Rio de Janeiro. Following a dispute between the Captain and crew, all the crew were paid off from the ship and Burns then obtained a berth as steward on the barque Nimrod, Captain Eilbeck, which set out for Australia and arrived at Sydney on 22 August 1828.

== Colonial Australia and trading voyages ==
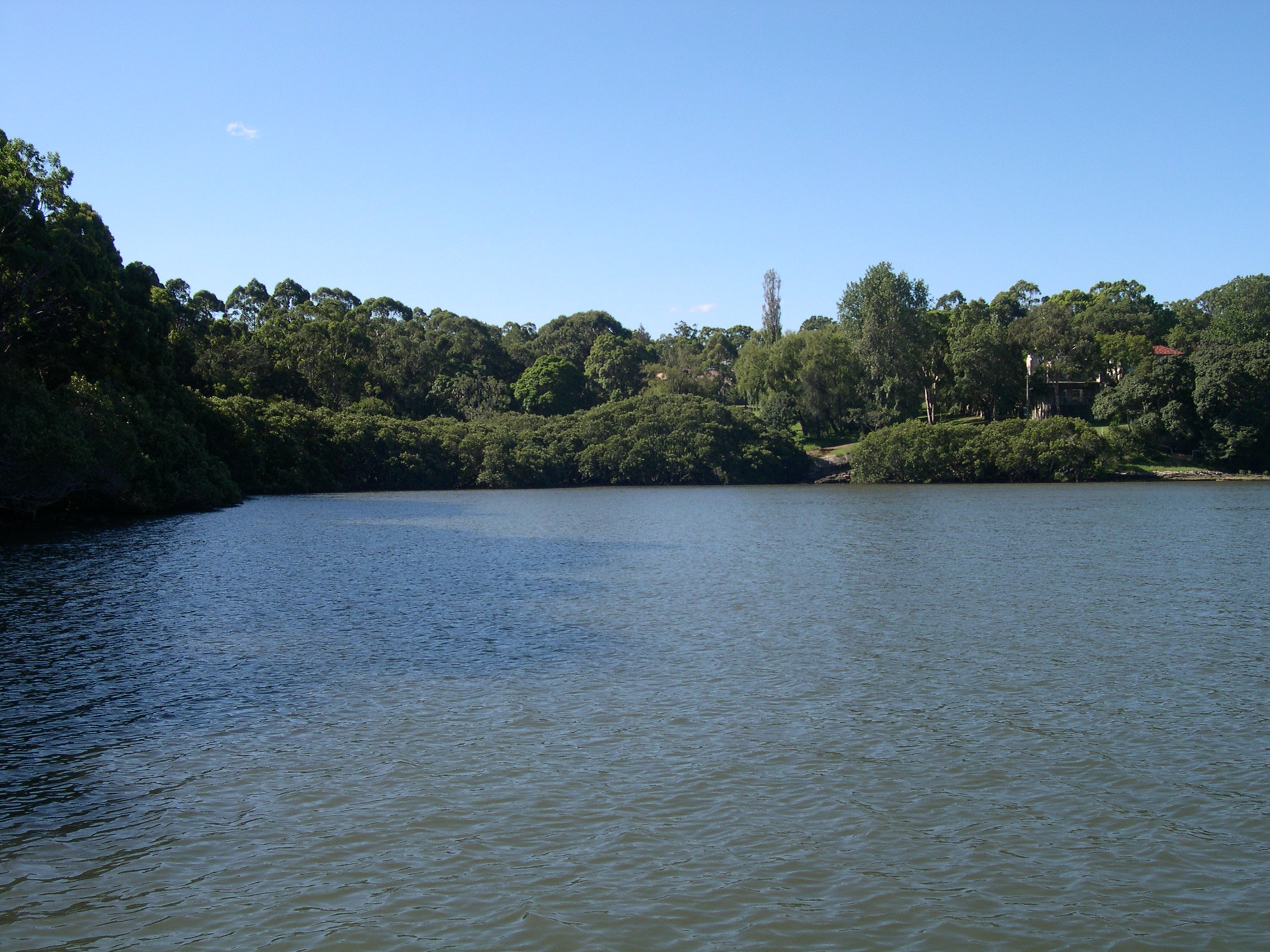
Tambourine Bay, where Barnet Burns had his property 1830–1835

Barnet Burns worked as a house servant for William Henry Mackenzie of the Bank of Australia. He commenced employment at about the time of the Bank of Australia robbery on 14 September 1828. Burns also worked with other prominent businessmen of colonial Sydney, who supported Burns's application for a land grant in May 1830. A plot of 10 acres (40,000 m^{2}) was granted at Tambourine Bay on the Lane Cove River.

Burns joined the brig Elizabeth, captain Brown, on a trading voyage to New Zealand departing Sydney on 23 July 1830. During his time in New Zealand Burns learned the Māori language. The Elizabeth returned to Sydney on 5 January 1831 and soon afterwards Burns appeared before the Police Magistrates where he was convicted of gross assault. A fellow seaman on the Elizabeth, James Nance, had accused Burns of being a convict and Burns had reacted by "leading [Nance] about the decks by his nose, like a pig by the snout". Burns was ordered to "enter into his own recognizances to the amount of £10, to preserve the peace for twelve months".

Flax on the coast of New Zealand

In January 1831 the Sydney merchant Joseph Barrow Montefiore had just returned from a voyage to New Zealand and required flax traders to be located at various parts of New Zealand. Barnet Burns agreed to return to New Zealand to trade with the Māori for New Zealand flax (Phormium tenax), used mainly for rope materials. On 13 February 1831 Burns departed Sydney on the schooner Darling, captain William Stewart, with various items of trade including clothing, leather goods, muskets, gunpowder, tobacco and pipes, ironmongery, hardware and rum. The Darling stopped at several places on the west coast of the North Island, including Kawhia, Mōkau, Taranaki and Kapiti Island, before proceeding through Cook Strait to the east coast where Burns was landed at Māhia Peninsula. The Darling continued on to Poverty Bay, where John Williams Harris was landed on 16 May 1831. Harris and Burns were among the first European residents in the area.

== Pākehā-Māori ==
In the 1830s the east coast of the North Island of New Zealand was a place constantly under the threat of attack from neighbouring Māori tribes. In the preceding decades the Ngā Puhi from the Bay of Islands had obtained muskets and made devastating attacks on their southern neighbours. The Māhia peninsula became a place of refuge for various Māori that felt threatened at an intensification of tribal warfare, decimation, enslavement and migration. Burns wrote: "So here I was amongst a set of cannibals ... not knowing the moment when they might take my trade from me, and not only my trade, but my life."

At the Māhia Peninsula Barnet Burns was protected by a chief whom he called "Awhawee" but whom Māori oral records know as "Te Aria" or "Aria". Burns married the chief's daughter, Amotawa and lived as a Pākehā Māori with mana and benefits in business transactions. Burns's hapū was probably Te Whānau-a-Ruataupare which was part of Te Uranga Wera or the burnt post tribe, a collection of hapū from the Tokomaru Bay area.

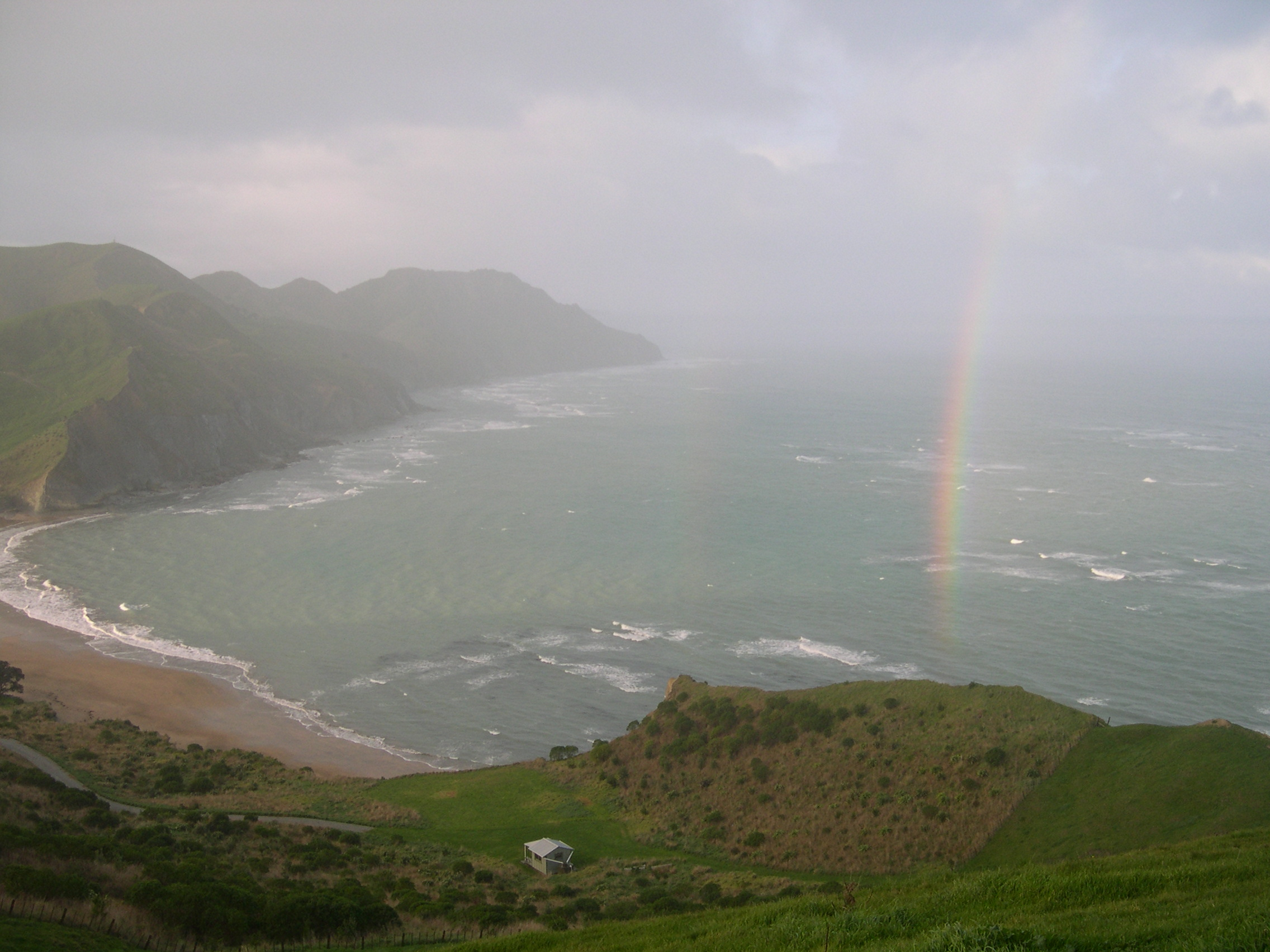
Southern side of Te Kuri a Paoa and Waihi beach

It is likely that Burns and the tribe were located at Nukutaurua on the north-eastern coast of the Māhia Peninsula. After 11 months a vessel arrived with orders to close the trading station but Burns refused to leave with the ship as Amotawa was about to give birth. Shortly afterwards most of the tribe went some distance from their pā to cultivate the potato gardens. Burns learned that the neighbouring Ngāti Te Whatuiāpiti threatened to plunder the remaining trade goods. Burns escaped with Amotawa and her father in an open waka (canoe) and seven other Māori and they headed north stopping overnight at Whareongaonga before landing at Waihi near Orongo beach on the southern side of Te Kuri a Paoa (Young Nick's Head). The canoe was hauled out of the water and the local Māori, likely the Ngāi Tāmanuhiri, carried the property for nearly 13 miles (21 km) to Poverty Bay. A day later Burns proceeded 12 miles (19 km) inland to a stronghold of the Rongowhakaata at Manutuke on the Waipaoa River where there were two strong defensive pā named Umukapua and Orakaiapu. Soon afterwards at the request of his Chief, Burns went to Maraetai with about seven hundred men to battle but their enemies had fled and they returned and lived again in peace.

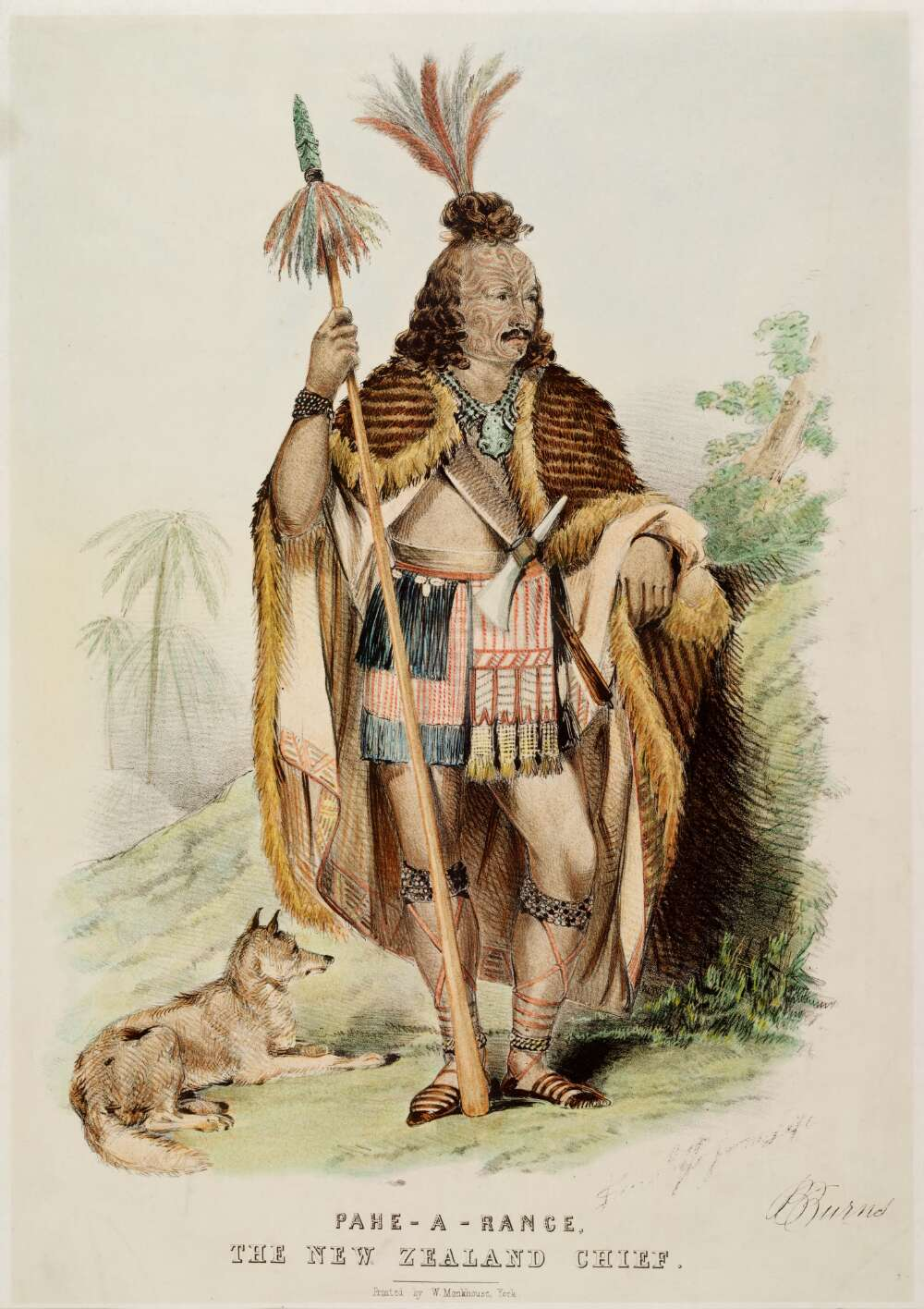
Barnet Burns in Māori costume, image from National Library of Australia

During an inland flax-buying trip with some of the members of his tribe, a party of Ngāi Te Rangi attacked, killed and ate the group with the exception of Barnet Burns. He managed to negotiate for his life by agreeing to live, fight and trade with them. Also, as part of the negotiations, Burns had to agree upon the party tattooing him. He was forced to have his full face, chest, thighs, and arms tattooed as a sign of loyalty to the tribe. Even though Burns did not want to, he agreed to save his life. When about a quarter of the tattoo on his face was completed, Burns escaped and found his way back to his own tribe, who sought vengeance without success as the Ngāi Te Rangi were not to be found.

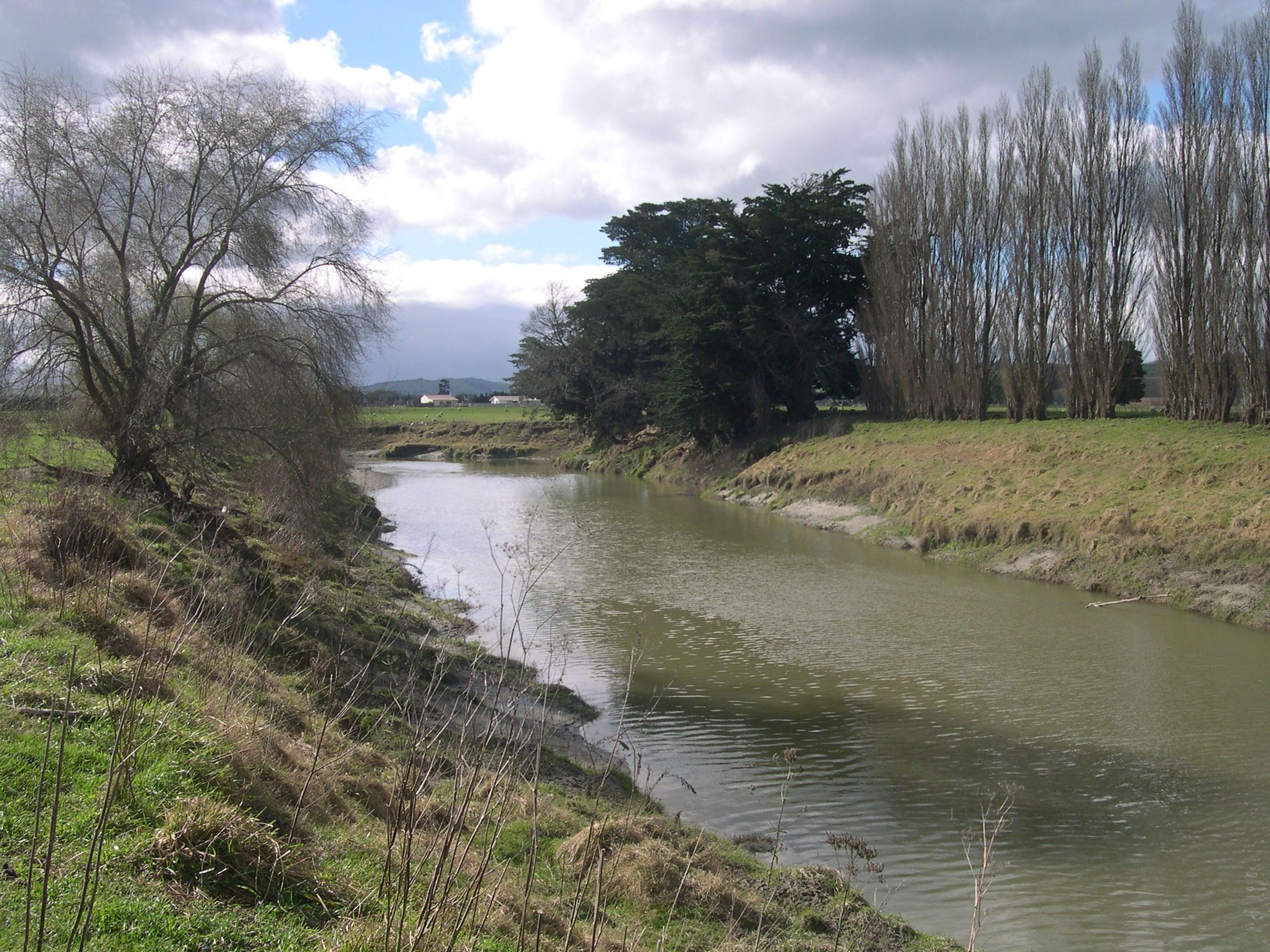
The Kekeparaoa pā site was at the location of the dark green trees on the Waikohu River

In 1832 subtribes of Te Whakatohea from the Bay of Plenty region had settled in an area inland from Poverty Bay. An alliance of about 600 men from Rongowhakaata, Ngati Kahungunu, Te Aitanga-a-Hauiti and Ngā Puhi under Te Wera a Hauraki besieged about 400 men, women and children of Te Whakatohea at the pā of Kekeparaoa, located near the confluence of the Waipaoa River and the Waikohu river. Burns claimed to have led 150 men in the siege which lasted about three weeks. He described how a Whakatohea woman had attempted to escape from the pā by swimming across a river. She was captured and imprisoned. Resigned to being eaten, she assisted in preparing potatoes and threw herself onto the fire for a hāngī feast. When the pā at Kekeparaoa had been breached, many of the imprisoned occupants were shared between the victorious tribes. Burns says he witnessed about 60 of the prisoners being killed and eaten; the flesh being cooked in a hāngī or smoked for transportation to fellow tribal members.

The schooner Prince of Denmark arrived at Poverty Bay and Burns was then engaged by the captain to continue as a flax trader at £3 a month. He agreed to establish himself further north at Uawa which was named Tolaga Bay by Captain James Cook. When he arrived at Uawa, Burns settled on the northern side of the Uawa river with Te Urunga Wera while on the southern side another white man traded for Captain John Rudolphus Kent with Te Aitanga-a-Hauiti. From 1832 to 1834 he sent about 107 tons of flax to Sydney and he considered these his happiest years in New Zealand. Burns claimed to have been made a chief of over 600. The remaining part of his face and parts of his body were tattooed at nearby Waihau (Loisels beach).

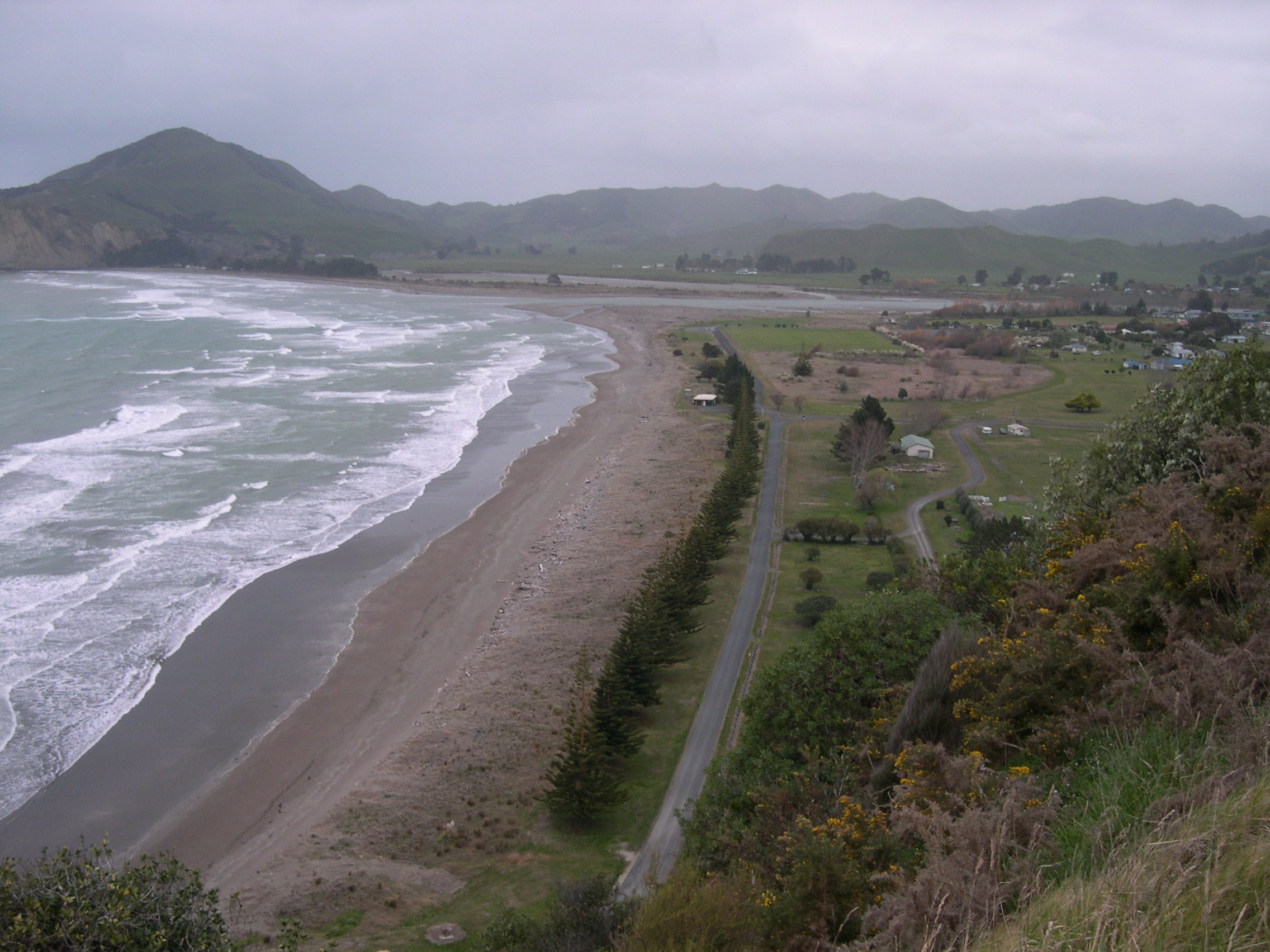
The Uawa river mouth at Tolaga Bay

While at Uawa in about April 1833, Barnet Burns learned that three Englishmen were being held captive on the Waiapu River, near East Cape, the easternmost point of the North Island of New Zealand. A whaling vessel, Elizabeth, commanded by captain Black, had stopped at East Cape for provisions and during her stay three of the crew had run away. In return captain Black had seized 15 of the local Ngāti Porou and taken them away on the Elizabeth. Burns took a waka with about 60 men and after three days they had travelled from Uawa to Waiapu and found the Englishmen confined at a pā which was probably at Whakawhitira. The chief Kakatarau agreed to their release in exchange for a ransom that was to be paid at Uawa. However the Ngāti Porou were unfamiliar with the bay at Uawa and their waka capsized with the result that the ransom payment was waived. The schooner, Lord Byron later took the Englishmen to Sydney. The 15 Ngāti Porou had been taken to the Bay of Islands, enslaved by Ngā Puhi, released and introduced to Christianity by the missionaries. In January 1834 the Ngāti Porou were returned to the East Cape on the schooner Fortitude by Rev William Yate and Rev William Williams of the Church Missionary Society.

== Departure from Uawa ==
In October 1834 the ship Bardaster, Captain John Thomas Chalmers, arrived at Uawa. Burns loaded his trade of flax and advised Captain Chalmers that he wished to settle with his employer in Sydney and so Burns paid £5 for a passage. He bid farewell to his wife and children and Burns accompanied the ship to Sydney via Cloudy Bay and Queen Charlotte Sound. His children were daughters Tauhinu, Mokoraurangi and son Hori Waiti, who may have been born soon after Burns's departure. Te Amotawa later married the Māori chief Te Kani-a-Takirau.

Soon after the Bardaster arrived at Sydney on 2 November 1834, Barnet Burns arranged to transfer his grant of land at Tambourine Bay to Captain John Thomas Chalmers. At that time thousands of convicts resided in New South Wales and as Burns roamed the streets of Sydney his facial tattoo aroused suspicion that he had submitted to the operation of tattooing in order to prevent being recognised.

On 24 February 1835 the Bardaster departed Sydney for England with Barnet Burns aboard earning his passage in his former role as a sailor.

== Initial appearances of Pahe-a-Range in England ==
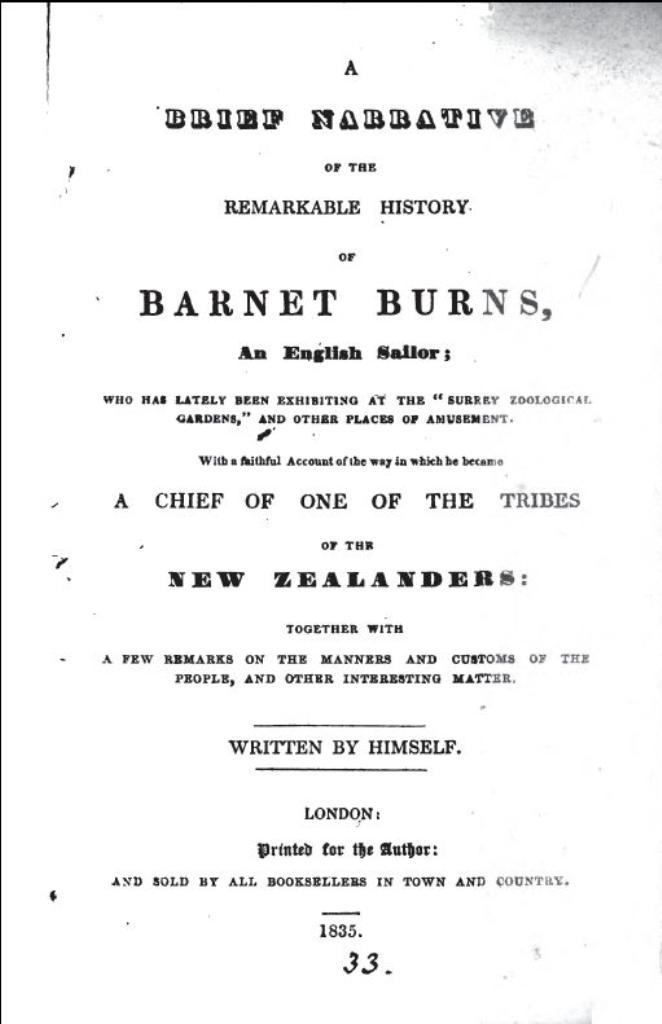
Title page of the first edition of Barnet Burns's book published in London, 1835

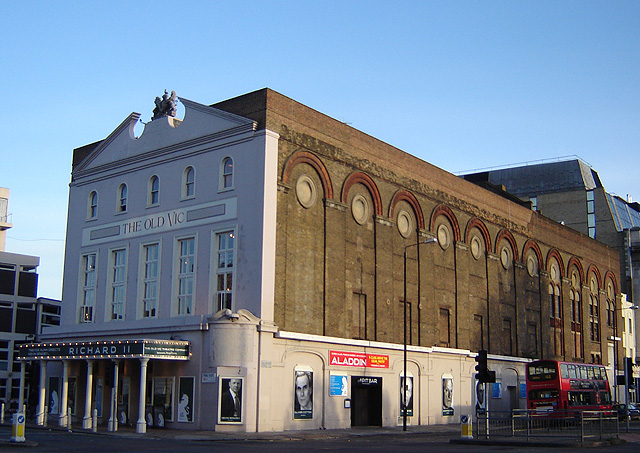
The Old Vic Theatre, Waterloo, London. Burns lectured here in the mid-1830s

By mid-1835 Barnet Burns had left the ship Bardaster and returned to London. On 1 June 1835 Barnet Burns married Bridget Cain at the Christ Church Greyfriars opposite St Paul's Cathedral but little else is known about this union.

Barnet Burns soon published a booklet about his experiences in Australia and New Zealand. Copyright for the booklet was obtained at the Worshipful Company of Stationers' Hall at Ludgate Hill, London on 1 September 1835. Burns's publication had the lengthy title: A Brief Narrative of the Remarkable History of Barnet Burns, an English sailor; who has lately been exhibiting at the Surrey Zoological Gardens and other Places of Amusement. With a faithful account of the way in which he became a chief of one of the tribes of the New Zealanders: together with a few remarks on the manners and customs of the people, and other interesting matter.

Barnet Burns commenced a career of showman and lecturer. His initial appearances in London included the Surrey Zoological Gardens (later the Royal Surrey Gardens), Victoria Theatre (now the Old Vic), Surrey Theatre and Astley's Amphitheatre. Introduced as Barnet Burns, The New Zealand Chief, he performed various Māori songs and dances, including the haka, and he described customs of the Māori. Upon obtaining an opportunity to appear at the Surrey Zoological Gardens, Barnet Burns had made merry in honour of his engagement". The tattooed Englishman was brought before the Police Magistrate at Union Hall, London but Burns was soon "discharged and, out of spirits, taken to water".

An edition of Burns's booklet was published at Southampton in 1836 and in April Thomas Morgan wrote to the Foreign Office suggesting that Burns could lead a colonisation of New Zealand or the new colony of South Australia. Burns proposed the establishment of a small colony of artisans and tradesmen under his protection, and offered to supply the British government and merchants with timber and flax. There is no record of the British government accepting Burns's proposal. Later in April 1836, Burns entertained in the Portsmouth and Portsea Theatre at the conclusion of a romance play.

Barnet Burns had styled himself as Pahe-a-Range (or Pahe-a-Rangi) and in May 1836 he appeared at the Chichester Mechanics' Institution, where his lectures were described as "one incongruous jumble of impudence, of ignorance, of low wit, and bare-faced presumption". This description was criticised by a reporter who attended lectures by Burns at the Town Hall of Brighton and recommended that Burns obtain the assistance of someone to help arrange the lectures. Despite Burns's shortcomings, the reporter stated that "those who go to a lecture to obtain information, without caring by what means it is conveyed, could, notwithstanding the rambling and unconnected nature of his address, gather sufficient to remunerate them for the money and time expended in attending it."

== Chef de tribu de la Nouvelle Zélande ==
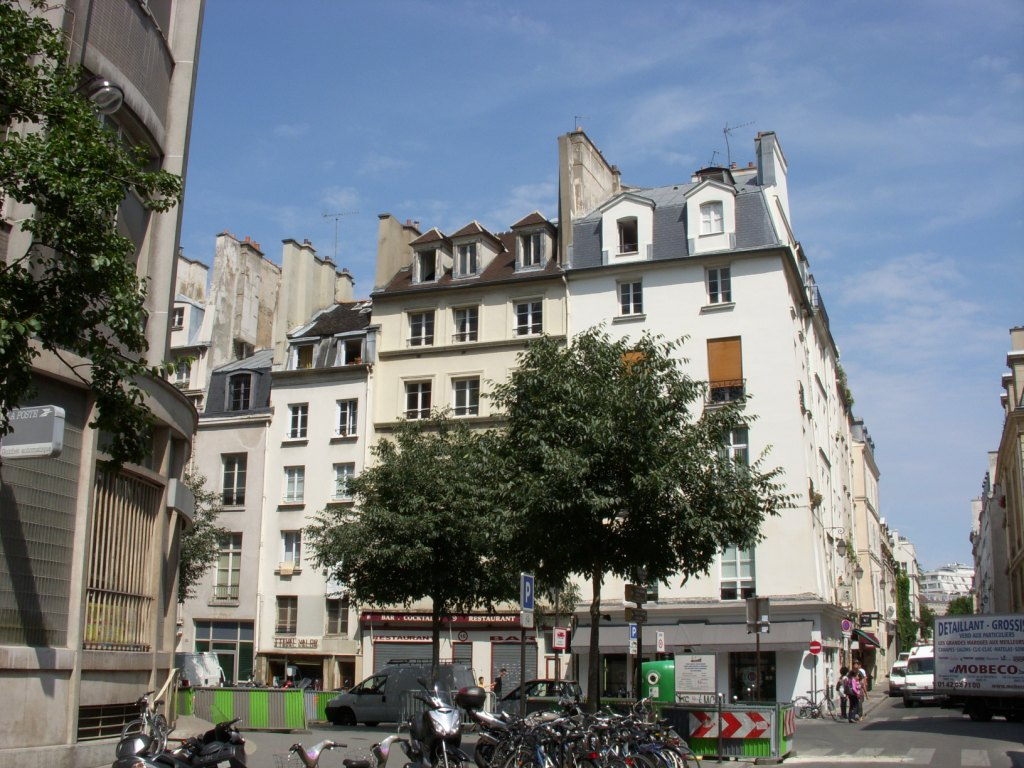
Barnet Burns and his family lived at Rue Pastourelle in Paris during the late 1830s. Their house is the second to the left of the intersection

Barnet Burns moved to France in late 1836. An unsuccessful appearance before the Académie des sciences at the Institut de France in Paris resulted in the academicians being annoyed at being deceived by Burns, who had apparently claimed to be King of Zealand.

In 1837 Burns appeared at Nantes where he exhibited himself at a shop in rue de Gorges with an assurance that he would remain civilized for visitors. Burns was described as a cannibal, but in his booklet he is careful to avoid any suggestion that he himself consumed human flesh.

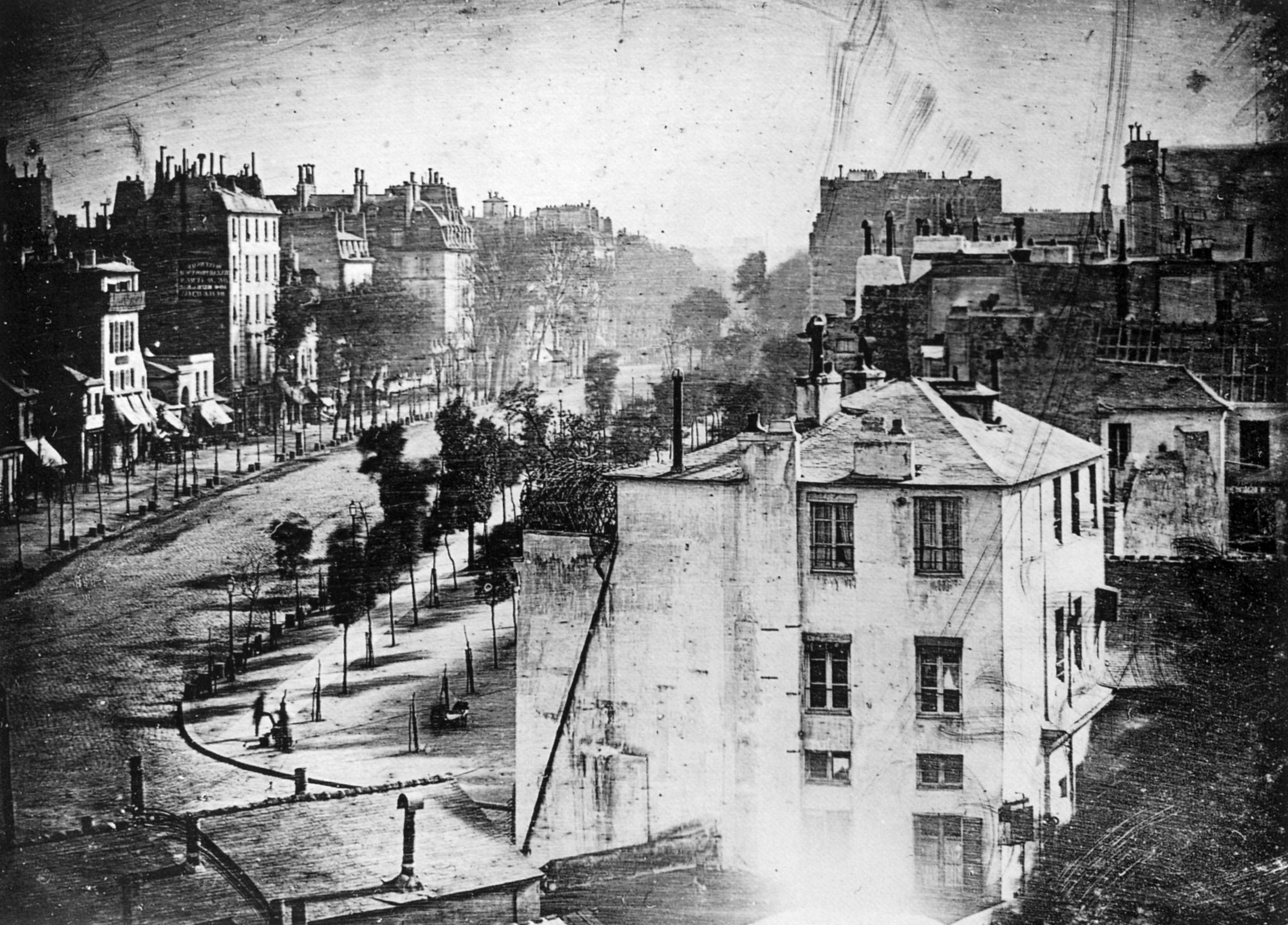
Barnet Burns lectured at the Boulevard du Temple, Paris at about the time of this daguerreotype taken in 1838

On 22 September 1838 Barnet Burns married a French workwoman named Anne Mélanie Boval at the town hall of the 7th arrondissement of Paris. Anne Boval was born in Paris on 1 April 1820 to Jean Baptiste Boval and Jeanne Louise Couchard.

Burns and his wife lived at 16 Rue Pastourelle in the 3rd arrondissement of Paris and had two children who, it appears, died young.

Barnet Burns presented himself as a tattooed New Zealand Chief at the nearby Boulevard du Temple.

Barnet Burns's booklet was published at Rouen in about 1839 and in 1840 he was at Le Havre. Burns was apparently summoned by Queen Victoria to take part in an English expedition to New Zealand in the capacity of interpreter. Following his departure, Burns's wife, Anne never heard from him again.

== Possible return visit to New Zealand ==
There is circumstantial evidence for Barnet Burns making a return trip to New Zealand between February 1839 and October 1840.

Barnet Burns had expressed a desire to return to New Zealand and had applied to join the expedition of the New Zealand Company on its ship Tory which sailed from London on 4 May 1839. His wife in France, Anne (née Boval) understood that in 1840 Barnet Burns had travelled as an interpreter for an English expedition to New Zealand. Several English newspapers reported on a visit by Barnet Burns in about 1841. and it appears that he worked with the Wesleyan missionaries The census undertaken in Britain in June 1841 lists Barnet Burns's occupation as mariner which suggests that he had recently sailed. Barnet Burns's son, Hori Waiti, claims to remember his father escaping. Given the short period that Burns initially spent in New Zealand, Hori Waiti would only remember his father if Burns had made a return trip.

Finally, Arthur Thomson mentions that: "One unemployed tattooed Pakeha Maori visited England, and acted the part of a New Zealand savage in several provincial theatres. Here he married an Englishwoman who accompanied him to New Zealand, but she eloped with a Yankee sailor, because the tattooed actor's old Maori wife met him and obtained an influence over him the white woman could not combat." There are several similarities between this Pākehā Māori and Barnet Burns to suggest that they might be the same person.

== Marriage to Mrs Rosina Crowther ==
The 1841 United Kingdom census recorded the occupants of every UK household on the night of 6 June 1841 when Barnet Burns, mariner, and Rosina Crowther, pedlar, were lodging at Vincent Street, Sculcoates, Kingston upon Hull. A few days later, The New Zealand Chief, Mr. Burns, delivered two lectures at the Hull Mechanics' Institute. The broadside for the lectures explains how he was saved from being eaten by the "interposition of one of the Chief's daughters; how he ingratiated himself into their favour, submitted to be tattooed and ultimately became chief of a tribe". The broadside continues to advertise that "he will also exhibit the real head of a New Zealand Chief, his opponent in battle, and describe the operation of tattooing, &c." Burns was to be accompanied by Mrs Crowther who would "perform several favourite Airs upon The Musical Glasses at Intervals during the Evening."

On 18 June 1841, Barnet Burns appeared at the Hull Zoological Gardens to participate in a Grand Gala in commemoration of the Battle of Waterloo, which occurred 26 years previously. In addition to his usual repertoire describing Māori customs, Burns appeared on the lake and showed how the Māori rowed their waka including how a chief excited his comrades to action. The Gala included a display of fireworks, Montgolfier balloons and performances from military bands.

In January 1842 Barnet Burns had moved to Birmingham where he lectured before the Mechanics' Institution at Newhall Street and where he had a booklet published. By that time he and Rosina had married as the handbill states that "Mrs. Burns will also perform several admired Airs and Waltzes upon the Musical Glasses".

== Showman and lecturer ==
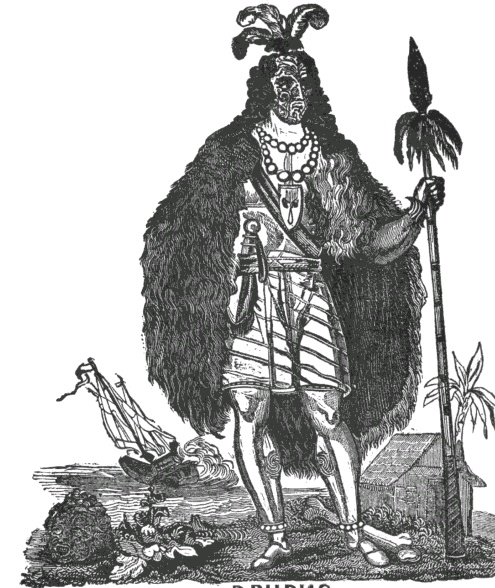
A stylised picture of Barnet Burns as a New Zealand chief from his book

From 1842 Barnet Burns and his wife Rosina continued their extensive lecture series. In 1842 alone, appearances by Barnet and Rosina Burns are recorded at the Mechanics' Institution in Hanley, the Burslem and Tunstall Literary and Scientific Institution, Kidderminster Athenæum, Lecture Hall, Wardwick, Derby, the National School at Beeston, the Lincoln Mechanics' Institution and at Dublin.

In late 1844 Barnet Burns appeared in London where he was engaged at the Royal Adelaide Gallery. One of New Zealand's early colonists, Jerningham Wakefield was unimpressed by one of Burns's lectures describing how the lecturer dressed "with sandals and strings of beads on his legs and wrists, a leopard-skin petticoat, a necklace of pig's tusks, and a crown of blue feathers a foot long, – sings NZ ditties to a tune!, and talks gibberish, which he translates into romantic poetry." In December 1845 Barnet Burns lodged a complaint to the Police Magistrate at Worship-Street, London against Henry Sproules Edwards, who had disrupted one of Burns's lectures by publicly denouncing him as a fraud.

By 1847 Barnet Burns had a manager, Lionel Violet Gyngell who announced appearances by Barnet and Rosina Burns during a tour that included Hawkstone Hall, Shrewsbury, Welshpool, Oswestry and Ellesmere.

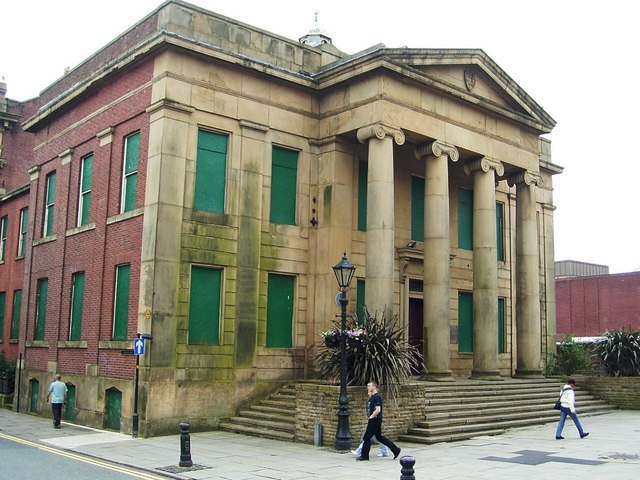
Oldham Town Hall, where Barnet Burns delivered two lectures in May 1848

Editions of Burns's booklet continued to be published where he lectured on his travels through Britain. The 1848 Kendal edition includes a stylised picture of Barnet Burns carrying the head of a tattooed Māori chief. On their tour Pahe-a-Range and Madame Pahe-a-Range appeared at the Oldham Town Hall, the Beverley Mechanics' Hall, the parish school-house at Burton Agnes before Robert Isaac Wilberforce, York Mechanics' Institute, the parish at Gringley-on-the-Hill, the schoolroom at Lea near Gainsborough before Charles Henry John Anderson and in May 1849 he returned to the Mechanics' Institution at Lincoln. Barnet Burns was dressed "in a buff skin dress, which was to represent his skin, various ornaments round his neck of bones, &c., a belt round him composed of human skin" and "the sceptre ... which had a head on it, the eyes of which were supposed to be the eyes of their deities". He encouraged his audience to consider New Zealand for immigration saying there was "no clime better calculated to suit the Englishman" and through the efforts of the missionaries New Zealand had "become civilized".

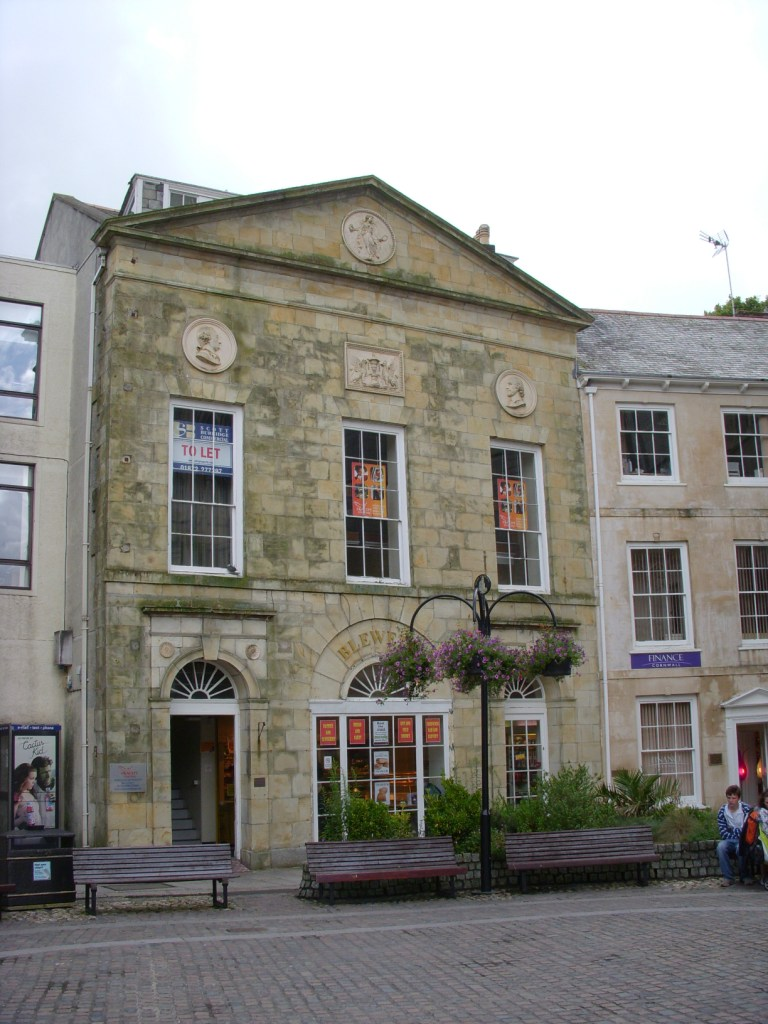
Assembly Room, Truro where Burns lectured in 1853

In about 1850, Burns gave his lectures in Manchester and one of the people in the audience was the wife of William Leonard Williams who was to be sent like his father as a missionary to New Zealand. In 1853 W. L. Williams presented Burns's booklet and a picture of Burns to his son, Hori Waiti, in front of a crowd at Tokomaru Bay. Williams had already checked the veracity of the booklet and picture, but he asked publicly if Burns was recognised and it was confirmed and Hori Waiti learnt that Burns was his father. This picture of Barnet Burns is still in the family.

A tour through Cornwall in early 1853 included lectures at the Assembly Room in Truro, the Town Hall in Redruth and Union Hall in Penzance. By this time Barnet Burns's occupation was given as Lecturer and that of Rosina Burns was given as Professor of Music, her musical glasses producing a harmony that was "indisputably the most exquisite".

In November 1856 Barnet Burns and his wife went to Leicester to deliver a course of lectures on New Zealand. Three lectures were advertised, but at the close of the second Burns became ill and was confined to his bed for nearly eight weeks. Rosina Burns sold every available article she possessed but soon they were destitute and an appeal was made for help. By January 1857 Barnet Burns had recovered sufficiently to be able to lecture accompanied, as usual, by Rosina on the musical glasses. Further funds were raised from an edition of Burns's booklet published at Leicester.

== Death ==
Barnet Burns died on 26 December 1860 at Eldad, East Stonehouse, Plymouth. The death certificate stated that George Barnet Burns, lecturer, died at age 53 and the cause of death was "morbus cordis cirrhosis of liver ascites". There were various times during his life when Burns had been found drunk and it seems that he finally succumbed to his alcoholism. His obituary stated that Barnet Burns was better known as Pahe-a-Range, the New Zealand Chief, that he had suffered a long and painful illness and that he left behind a widow and two children to lament their loss. The identities of the children mentioned in the obituary are not known.

Barnet Burns was buried in a common grave on 30 December 1860 at what is now the Ford Park Cemetery, Plymouth.
