= Sealers' War =

Conflict in southern New Zealand started by sealers in 1810

- Part of Māori – European early contact
Date	1810–1821
Location	Southern South Island, New Zealand
Result	Peace treaty and coexistence

Belligerents
Māori	Sealers

Casualties and losses
>31	43

The Sealers' War (1810–1821) in southern New Zealand (then part of the Colony of New South Wales), also known as the "War of the Shirt", was a series of often indiscriminate attacks and reprisals between Māori and European sealers. Initially minor misunderstandings between the two peoples quickly led to armed conflict. This resulted in a period of mistrust and animosity between Māori and sealers fueling several conflicts, leading to the deaths of about 74 people and the burning of the village of Ōtākou on the Otago Peninsula. Records exist from both sides of the conflict but not from any impartial observers.

== Sydney Cove and the initial incident 1810 ==
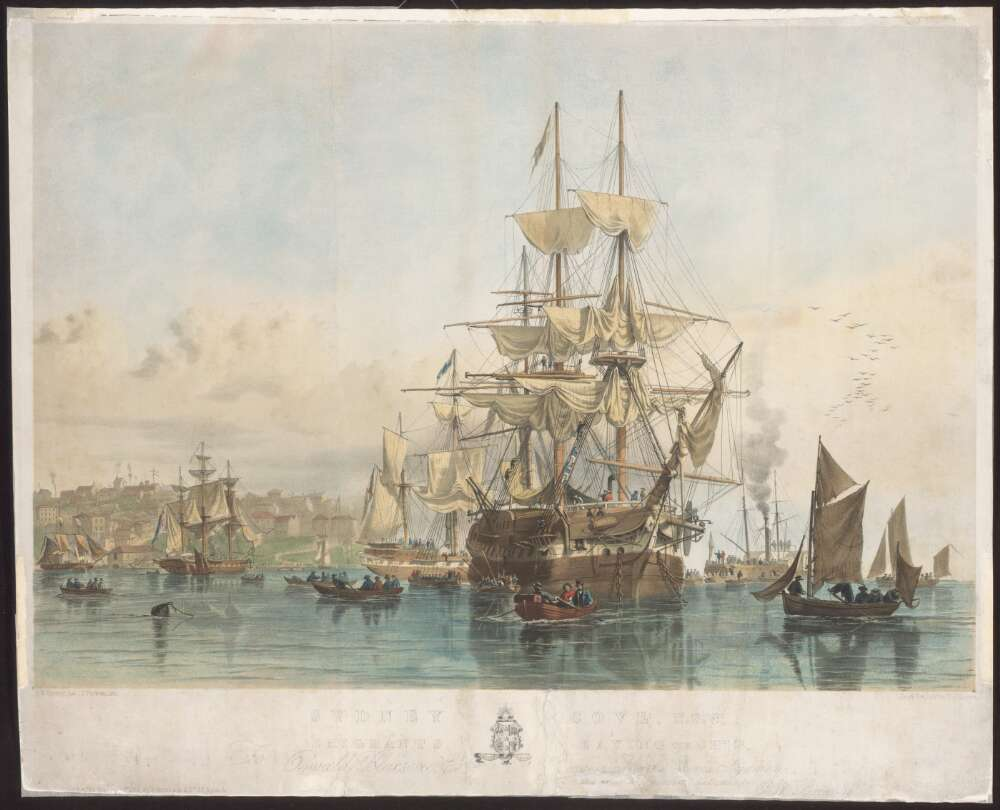
The Sydney Cove

Late in 1810, Sydney Cove, an English sealing vessel, was anchored in Otago Harbour while its crew were working at Cape Saunders on the Otago Peninsula. Māori were in the habit of visiting such vessels to trade for pork and potatoes. During one such visit, a Māori chief, Te Wareripirau, according to one of Creed's informants, or Te Wahia, according to the other, stole a red shirt and a knife amongst other items. Some of the sailors attacked the chief with cutlasses. He "fled from them with his bowels protruding through the wound in the side" and died. They left behind James Caddell who became one of the first Pākehā-Māori. At Waipapa Point one of Sydney Cove's gangs landed and proceeded overland to the Mataura River mouth, where they were surprised and killed by Māori under Honekai. The Sydney Cove paused at Stewart Island before continuing its voyage.

In a separate but related incident later that same year men from Brothers, who had been in the vicinity of Otago Harbour, proceeded south seeking a passing ship to take them back to Sydney. During this time four of them were surprised and killed by Māori.

== Matilda 1814 ==
These tensions still existed in 1814 when six lascars (Indian seamen) from Matilda, absconded from her in a long boat near Fiordland. Possibly near Dusky Sound three of them were killed and the other three were taken prisoner. Matilda went on to Stewart Island and from there sent Robert Brown in an open boat to look for the missing men. He came up the east coast and touched at Cape Saunders before going on up the coast to a point some eight miles north of Moeraki. There he and his seven companions hauled the boat ashore and went to sleep under it, but were seen by Māori and attacked and all but two were killed. The two survivors fled through the night to what is now known as Bobby's Head near the Pleasant Valley. Māori initially entertained the survivors, but upon discussion with later arriving Māori who had participated in the attack, killed the two survivors as well. Meanwhile, Fowler brought Matilda into Otago Harbour, the site of the 1810 incident. Here they received a friendly reception from the Māori and Fowler later used this to attempt a correction of the common conception that the Māori were hostile to Europeans.

== Sophia and the burning of Ōtākou 1817 ==
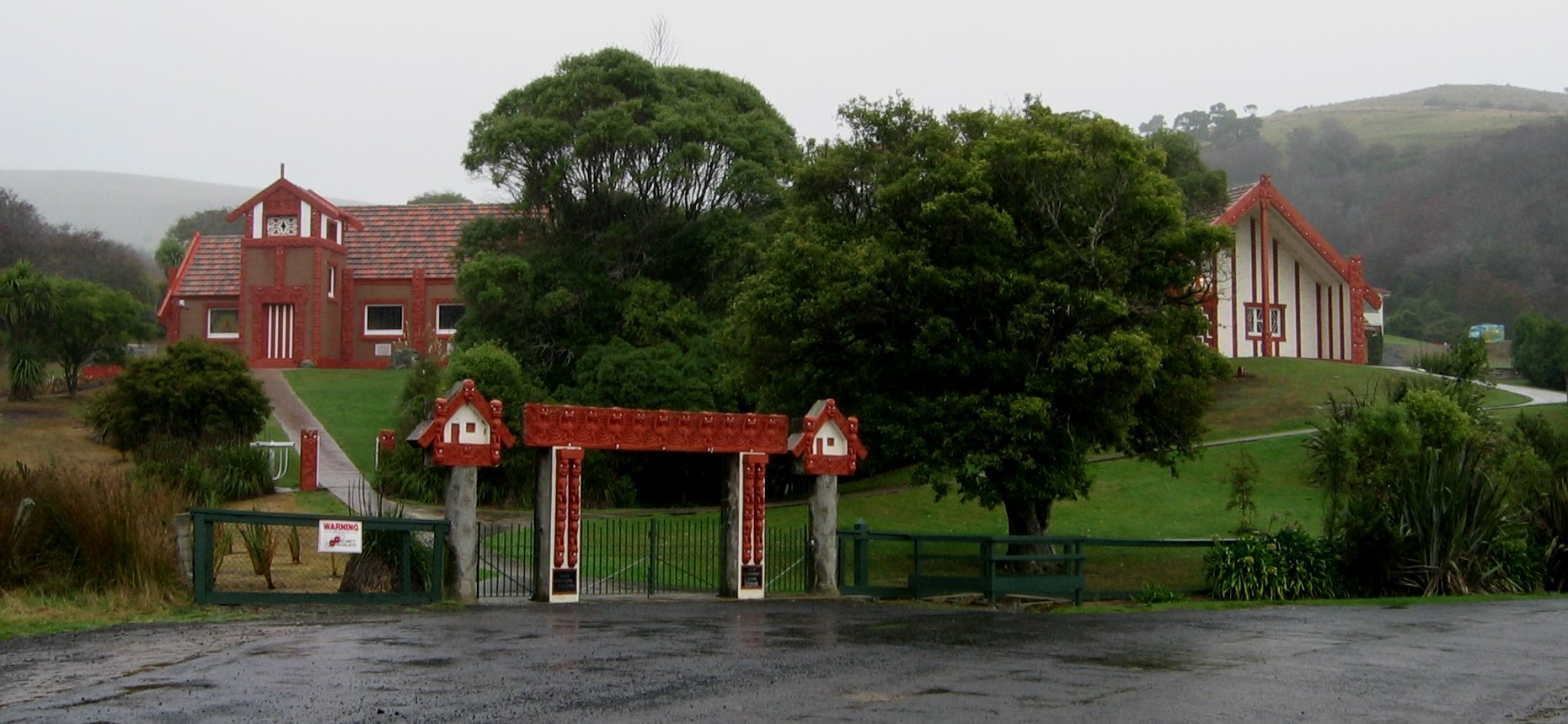
Part of the modern village of Ōtākou, Otago Harbour.

In 1815 William Tucker, who had been in the Otago Harbour area as early as 1809, landed again and settled at Whareakeake (later called Murdering Beach). There he kept goats and sheep, had a Māori wife, built a house, and apparently set up an export trade in ornamental hei-tiki – pounamu neck pendants made from old adzes. He left but returned on Sophia, a Hobart sealer commanded by James Kelly, apparently with other Europeans meaning to settle.

Sophia anchored in Otago Harbour in 1817 and Tucker was well received. Two or three days later Kelly went to visit Whareakeake in an open boat, with Tucker and five others, having been persuaded by Tucker not to take their firearms. At Whareakeake they had a friendly reception and encountered one of the Matilda's lascars who told them of his countrymen's fate. It seems Tucker had gone into his house but Kelly was attacked, at the instigation of the Whareakeake chief Te Matahaere. In the ensuing melee Veto Viole, John Griffiths, and William Tucker were killed (Griffiths was Kelly's brother-in-law).

Escaping by longboat, Kelly and the other survivors returned to Sophia in Otago Harbour. According to their own report, they found her boarded by more Māori; they regained control of the vessel after a bloody fight, during which the Māori chief, Korako, was captured, and later shot when he attempted to escape. Historians caution that Kelly's account of events, made to justify the actions he took, exaggerates the danger he and his men were in. It is certain that they killed many Māori, including Korako, at that time. Kelly then proceeded to destroy multiple canoes and set fire to "the beautiful city of Otago". This probably refers to Ōtākou, on the other side of the harbour; however, the Whareakeake village does seem to have been burned at around the same time, and abandoned rather than rebuilt. A tapu was placed on the site and lifted in the 1860s.

The motive for the attack at Whareakeake is unclear. Kelly believed it was a reprisal for previous shootings of Māori by Europeans. Another account accused Tucker of having stolen a Māori preserved head in 1811 and inaugurated the trade in these items; this is considered to be poorly evidenced. Local Māori tradition has it that the trouble arose over the Sophia's crew's treatment of the women at Ōtākou.

== General Gates and peace ==
These hostilities and the diminution of seal populations, saw a decline in sealing ventures to southern New Zealand. It seems this was unknown to Captain Abimeleck Riggs of the American sealer General Gates, who in late 1819 landed a gang at Stewart Island. He had a troubled cruise and it wasn't until 1821 that he returned. He then dropped a second gang and then a third at Taiari / Chalky Inlet.

Māori attacked the second gang in October 1821. Six of his men were captured, taken north up the west coast, where eventually four were killed. Meanwhile, the Māori killed a boy that the gang at Chalky left to look after their stores. The Māori pursued the rest of the gang and killed two members before the survivors came across Captain Edwardson of Snapper in Chalky Inlet. The pursuing Māori were led by 'Te Pehi', 'Topi' and 'Te Whera'. Also with the pursuers was James Caddell who had been captured from Sydney Cove and had acculturated to Māori society. Edwardson now took Caddell to Sydney, where his arrival caused a sensation in 1823 and where a peace was brokered. Thereafter, sealing resumed although it soon petered out again because the animal populations had been severely depleted.

== Bibliography ==
- Behold the Moon: the European Occupation of the Dunedin District 1770–1848, Peter Entwhistle, Port Daniel Press, Dunedin, 1998.
- Taka, a Vignette Life of William Tucker 1784–1817, Peter Entwhistle, Port Daniel Press, Dunedin, 2005.
