= William Tucker (settler) =

British convict, sealer and New Zealand settler (1784 – 1817)

William Tucker (c. 16 May 1784 – December 1817) was a British convict, a sealer, a trader in human heads, an Otago settler, and New Zealand’s first art dealer.

Tucker is the man who stole a preserved Māori head and started the retail trade in them. A document discovered in 2003 revealed his activities had no bearing on the war in the south and shows he was the first New Zealand art dealer, initially trading in human heads and secondarily in pounamu, a variety of nephrite jade.

== Background and childhood offence ==
He was baptised on 16 May 1784 at Portsea, Portsmouth, England, the son of Timothy and Elizabeth Tucker, people of humble rank. In 1798 Tucker and Thomas Butler shoplifted goods worth more than five shillings from a 'Taylor' William Wilday or Wildey, and were convicted and sentenced to death. They were then reprieved and sentenced to seven years' transportation to New South Wales. They left Portsmouth on Hillsborough on 20 December 1798.

The voyage was one of the worst in the history of transportation. ‘Jail Fever’ (typhus) raged through the ship, which lost 95 convicts before arriving at Sydney on 26 July 1799. It is not known where Tucker was assigned.

== Year of escape, flight and recapture ==
In January 1803, he and Anthony Rawson stowed away on Atlas, visiting China before reaching Deal in England on 13 December 1803. The stowaways were captured and sent under escort to Portsmouth to return to New South Wales on Experiment — many other returnees were hanged. They arrived back in Sydney on 24 June 1804.

== Emigration to New Zealand ==
In March 1805, shortly after his term expired, Tucker was advertised as shipping out on Governor King for the coast of New Zealand. She was one of the ships of Lord, Kable and Underwood, a group formed by Simeon Lord, Henry Kable, and James Underwood to exploit the sealing grounds at the Antipodes Islands to the south and east of New Zealand's South Island. She probably landed men at Dusky Sound on the South Island's south west coast. Tucker was probably later at the Antipodes Islands.

There were virtually no Europeans living ashore in New Zealand and Māori still lived much as they had for centuries. Maori society was tribal and based on the maintenance of honour, war being recurrent and often fought to get revenge, or 'utu', for an insult. The Māori had developed tattooing and moko to a greater extent than any other society and high born males wore full facial adornment unique to the individual. Some Māori preserved the heads of enemies and loved ones. These relics had interested the first European visitors, as had their carved jade ornaments.

Tucker may have left Sydney for England in 1807 in Sydney Cove whose command was taken over by Daniel Cooper en route. If so, he would have returned to New South Wales either in her, or Unity, Cooper's next command.

In April 1809, he was advertised to leave Sydney in the Pegasus. Instead, he left on Brothers, a ship chartered by Robert Campbell and probably intended for the Solander Islands in Foveaux Strait, between New Zealand's South Island and Stewart Island. In early November, he was one of eleven men landed at the ‘Isle of Wight’ and ‘Ragged Rock’ on what is now the Dunedin coast on the South Island's southeast coast. When Captain Mason returned to Port Daniel, now called Otago Harbour, on 3 May 1810, he found only Tucker and Daniel Wilson.

Tucker was sent to look for the missing men first on the Isle of Wight and then to ‘Ragged Point’, apparently the headland on Stewart Island at the western entrance to Foveaux Strait. It was probably then he stole a preserved Māori head, whose owners, discovering the loss, pursued the departing sealers. When they failed to find the missing men, Tucker rejoined Brothers at Otago Harbour and returned with her to Sydney on 14 July 1810.

Later that year, at Otago Harbour, a Māori chief's theft of a red shirt and knife from a man who disembarked from Sydney Cove started a rolling feud which soon took the lives of some of Brothers’ missing men and soured Māori/Pākehā relations in the south. It was called The Sealers' War, also 'The War of the Shirt’, and continued until 1823.

== Start of trade with Australia ==
Tucker left Sydney again on Aurora, on 19 September 1810 for the newly discovered Macquarie Island far to the south of New Zealand. At Campbell Island in early November, the location of Macquarie was obtained by bribing one of Campbell and Co's men. Aurora landed a gang at Macquarie that would have included Tucker. She left, returned, and brought her gang back to Sydney on 19 May 1811. It was presumably shortly after this that Tucker offered the Māori head for sale, inaugurating their retail trade and earning him the condemnation of ‘Candor’ in the Sydney Gazette, which called him ‘a wild fellow’ and a 'villain'.

He then spent time ashore, where, by August 1812, he was a labourer living with old shipmates in poor lodgings in Phillips Street. On 21 August he and Edward Williams stole a woman's fancy silk cloak, for which they were convicted in November, sentenced to a year's hard labour, and sent to Newcastle. By October–November 1814, he had left New South Wales, perhaps for Tasmania.

In 1815, he returned to Otago, perhaps in Governor Bligh, and took up residence at Whareakeake, later called Murdering Beach, a little to the north of Otago Heads. There he built a house and lived for a time with a Māori woman, keeping goats and sheep. There were no children. The site has long been known for its large quantities of worked greenstone, called pounamu in Māori, a variety of nephrite jade. This took the form of adzes worked with iron tools into pendants, or hei-tiki. Archaeologists have identified these as being produced for a European export trade. An 1819 editorial in the Sydney Gazette described the trade, saying it was carried on by ‘groupes of sealers’. It seems clear this was part of Tucker's enterprise. Māori called him ‘Taka’ adapting his surname, also ‘Wioree’, perhaps from the diminutive of his first name ‘Willy’. More formally and inaccurately, he was also styled ‘Captain Tucker’.

== Final voyage ==
He left, went to Hobart and returned on Sophia with Captain James Kelly, bringing other European settlers, according to Māori sources. The Sophia anchored in Otago Harbour on 11 December 1817.

‘Taka’ was welcomed by Māori of the harbourside settlement, but unknown to the visitors, the chief Korako, father of Te Matenga Taiaroa, refused to ferry across Māori from the north, Whareakeake, who had come to see Tucker and receive presents.

When Kelly, Tucker, and five others took a longboat to Whareakeake a few days later, they were initially welcomed. However, while Tucker was away in his house, the Māori attacked the others. Veto Viole and John Griffiths were killed, but Kelly managed to escape back to the longboat, as did Tucker. Tucker lingered in the surf, pleading with the Māori not to hurt Wioree, but he was speared and knocked down. He called out, ‘Captain Kelly, for God’s sake don’t leave me,’ before being killed. Kelly witnessed him being ‘cut limb from limb and carried away by the savages!’ Tucker's killer was Riri, acting on Chief Te Matahaere's orders. Taiaroa allegedly killed the others, and all the dead were eaten. A Māori source gave the immediate cause as dissatisfaction at not having the first opportunity to receive Tucker's gifts, but it was also said it was an unhappy consequence of the theft of the shirt in 1810 and its owner's savage reaction. This dramatic death was reported in Australian newspapers.

== Epilogue ==
Returning to his ship in the harbour, Kelly took revenge, by his account killing some Māori, destroying canoes, and firing ‘the beautiful City of Otago’, a harbourside settlement, probably on Te Rauone beach near modern Ōtākou.

Tucker has been remembered for stealing the head and inaugurating the controversial trade. It was banned in New South Wales in 1831, but continued anyway. Ten were sold by a single Māori vendor later in the 1830s, apparently at Otago. The theft inspired Shena Mackay's 1993 novel Dunedin reflecting his role as a minor legend.

However, the Creed manuscript, written by the Reverend Charles Creed in the 1840s recording the information of two Maori informants and discovered in 2003, shows Tucker in a new light. His theft was not responsible for the war in the south; he was generally liked by Māori and welcomed as a settler. In fact, he was the first European to settle in what is now the city of Dunedin, as distinct from sojourning, jumping ship or being held as a captive. While his inauguration of the trade in heads has been condemned even by his own countrymen, since that time his fostering of the trade in tiki has revealed him as an enterprising art dealer, in fact New Zealand's first.

== See also ==
- List of convicts transported to Australia
