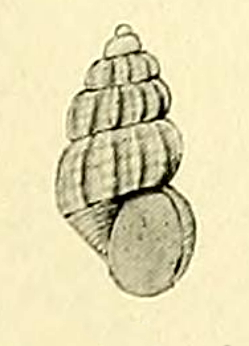
- Shell of Alvania exserta (holotype)

Scientific classification
- Kingdom: Animalia
- Phylum: Mollusca
- Class: Gastropoda
- Subclass: Caenogastropoda
- Order: Littorinimorpha
- Superfamily: Rissooidea
- Family: Rissoidae
- Genus: Alvania
- Species: A. exserta

Binomial name
- Alvania exserta (Suter, 1908)

Synonyms
- Alvania (Linemera) exserta (Suter, 1908) · alternate representation; Alvinia (Linemera) exserta (Suter, 1908) (superseded combination); Rissoa (Alvania) exserta Suter, 1908 (superseded combination); Rissoa exserta Suter, 1908 (superseded combination)

= Alvania exserta =

Species of gastropod

Alvania exserta is a species of small sea snail, a marine gastropod mollusk or micromollusk in the family Rissoidae.

== Description ==
The length of the shell attains 2.6 mm, its diameter 1.6 mm.

(Original description) The small, elongately oval shell is imperforate, thin, semitransparent, but faintly shining. It is strongly axially costate and spirally striate.

The sculpture consists of distant, stout axial riblets with a rather sharp edge, ten to eleven on the upper whorls, twelve to fourteen on the body whorl, on which they vanish below the periphery. The interstices and the riblets are crossed by distant spiral threads, about fourteen on the body whorl. They are closer together upon the base.

The colour of the shell is white. In fresh examples the apex is pinkish-brown.

The spire is elevated conical, about twice the height of the aperture. The outlines are slightly convex. The protoconch is small, globular, of one and a half microscopically densely spirally striate whorls. The shell contains four whorls, the body whorl is large in proportion, flattened below the suture, thence strongly convex. The base of the shell is rounded. The suture is deep. The oval aperture is subvertical. ThepPeristome is continuous, thickened inside and is sharp. The outer lip contains a varix formed by the last axial riblet. The basal lip is slightly effuse. The short columella is oblique and slightly arcuate. The operculum is unknown.

== Distribution ==
This marine species is endemic to New Zealand and was found off Otago Heads and off Snares Island, Auckland Island and Campbell Island.
