= Sydney Cove (1803 ship) =

History

Netherlands
- Launched: 1803, Rotterdam, Netherlands

United Kingdom
- Name: Sydney Cove
- Namesake: Sydney Cove
- Owner: 1806:Plummer & Co.; 1810:John Bull; 1815:Morrison
- Fate: Last listed in Lloyd's Register in 1823

General characteristics
- Tons burthen: 282, or c.283 (bm)
- Length: 94 ft 3 in (28.7 m)
- Beam: 26 ft 0 in (7.9 m)
- Propulsion: Sail
- Armament: 8 × 12-pounder carronades
- Notes: Two decks & three masts

Sydney Cove was built in 1803 at Rotterdam, Netherlands. She made two voyages to New South Wales, during the first of which she transported convicts, and during the second of which she went whale and seal hunting. Her crew's interaction with the Māori at New Zealand sparked the Sealers' War, a long-running violent feud between sealers and whalers on the one hand, and the Māori on the other. She was last listed in 1823.

== Career ==
Sydney Cove first appears in the supplemental pages to Lloyd's Register for 1806, which gives her owner as Plummer, her master as Edwards, and her trade as London-South Seas. This information repeats for 1807, with the addition of armament. Plummer (of Plummer, Barham and Company) was only the nominal owner of Sydney Cove. The true owners were Lord, Cable and Underwood.

Under the command of William Edwards, she sailed from Falmouth, England on 11 January 1807, and arrived at Port Jackson on 18 June. She carried four male and 113 female convicts, of whom three female convicts died on the voyage. Sydney Cove left Port Jackson on 26 October bound for England. She was carrying cargo (including skins), and passengers from Commerce. At St Helena Daniel Cooper, who had been sailing on her, took over command for the remainder of the journey home. Skins that she brought home with her sold in London in 1809 (after Plummer's expenses), for £ 6636 6s 6d. Plummer had kept them off a glutted market and when he sold them he received only 4s per skin, net, having earlier turned down a better offer.

Under Captain M'Larin Sydney Cove arrived at Port Jackson again on 14 April 1808. She had gathered both whale oil and seal skins. When she left on 18 July 1809, her destination was given as "Fishery". In 1810 she was at Otago Harbour while her crew were working at Cape Saunders on the Otago Peninsula. The theft, by a Māori chief, of a red shirt, a knife, and several other items from her led sailors on Sydney Cove to attack the chief, wounding him fatally. This is believed to have led to more than a decade of conflict throughout southern New Zealand. Sydney Cove and her boats moved to the Molyneux – the modern Clutha River Mouth – where they attacked and killed another chief. They left behind James Caddell, who became one of the first Pākehā-Māori. At Waipapa Point one of Sydney Cove's sealing gangs landed and proceeded overland to the mouth of the Mataura, where Māori surprised and killed them. Sydney Cove then paused at Stewart Island before continuing her voyage. Sydney Cove returned to London on 18 August 1810 with either 8 or 18 crew members, having ignited an ongoing blood feud between sealers and Māori.

Sydney Cove left London on 8 October 1810 with a crew of 24 men. She returned to London in 1811.with sperm oil and seal skins.

Issues of Lloyd's Register from 1810 to 1814 show Sydney Cove, with M'Lauren, master, trading between London and New South Wales. However, the list of arrivals and departures from Port Jackson does not record any other arrivals and departures than the above two.

Sydney Cove returned from the south seas in 1813. In March, she put into Rio de Janeiro with her master and most of the crew dead.

In the 1815 volume of Lloyd's Register, Sydney Cove appears twice, first with a new owner, Morrison, and a new master, Hutchinson. In the second listing, her master is J. Morrison, and her owner is Morrison. For both entries, her trade was now London-[The] Brazils. Between the first and second listing, she gave up her armament.

== See also ==
- List of British prison hulks
- List of convict ship voyages to Western Australia
- Transport Board (Royal Navy)
- Prison ship
- First Fleet
