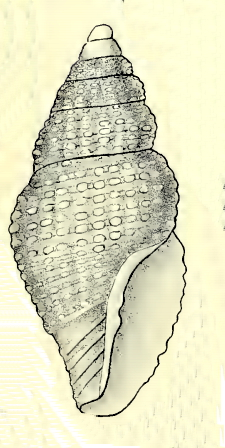
- Original image of a shell of Mitromorpha gemmata

Scientific classification
- Kingdom: Animalia
- Phylum: Mollusca
- Class: Gastropoda
- Subclass: Caenogastropoda
- Order: Neogastropoda
- Superfamily: Conoidea
- Family: Mitromorphidae
- Genus: Mitromorpha
- Species: M. gemmata

Binomial name
- Mitromorpha gemmata Suter, 1908

= Mitromorpha gemmata =

Species of gastropod

Mitromorpha gemmata is a species of sea snail, a marine gastropod mollusk in the family Mitromorphidae.

== Description ==
The height attains 7.1 mm, its diameter 3.2 mm.

(Original description) The small, ovate, semitransparent is thin and fragile. It is axially costate and spirally striate, the crossing-points gemmate. All the whorls below the smooth protoconch are axially equidistantly and closely costate, about 18 on the body whorl. The interstices are narrow. Towards the base the riblets are getting obsolete. They are crossed by equidistant spiral cords of nearly equal strength. The points of intersection are produced into transversely oval gemmules. The interstices between the spirals are of about equal width as the cords, but that below the first spiral is slightly deeper and broader than the others. On the body whorl there are about 15 spirals, of which the lowest 6 are smooth. The colour of the shell is white. The spire has an elevated conic shape, the outlines somewhat convex, but little higher than the aperture. The protoconch is a little oblique to the axis, of 1½ smooth whorls, the nucleus globose. The 6 whorls of the spire are convex, attenuated toward the base; the last high and somewhat ventricose. The suture is not deep, undulating, bimarginate. The aperture is slightly oblique, high and narrow, angled above, with a rudimentary broad siphonal canal below, its base truncated. The outer lip is convex, thin, crenated on the outside by the spiral sculpture, with a shallow sinus below the suture. The columella is subvertical, almost straight, with 2 rounded short plaits above, absent in young examples. The inner lip is thin and narrow, spreading over the straight parietal wall. The operculum is unknown.

== Distribution ==
This marine species is endemic to New Zealand and occurs off Otago Heads and Snares Islands.
