= Hākaraia Pāhewa =

Hākaraia Pāhewa (1869–1948) was a New Zealand Anglican minister. Of Māori descent, he identified with the Ngāti Porou iwi. He was born in Tokomaru Bay on the East Coast of New Zealand's North Island in about 1869.
