= James Kelly (Australian explorer) =

Australian mariner, explorer and port official (1791–1859)

James Kelly (1791–1859) was an Australian mariner, explorer and port official.

== Life ==
James Kelly was born on 24 December 1791 at Parramatta, New South Wales. He was probably the son of James Kelly, a cook in the convict transport Queen, and Catherine Devereaux, a convict transported for life from Dublin in the same ship.

Kelly was first apprenticed as a seaman in 1804 and sailed in vessels engaged in the sealing and sandalwood trades as well as making a voyage to India. In 1812, he was chief officer of the full-rigged ship Campbell Macquarie on a sealing voyage when the ship was wrecked on Macquarie Island. He became the first Australian-born master mariner with voyages in the sealing industry and general trade between Hobart and Sydney.

In 1814, he was master of the Henrietta Packet, a schooner owned by Thomas William Birch. carrying passengers and cargo between colonial ports.

In December 1815, Kelly left Hobart in command of an expedition to circumnavigate Tasmania using the whaleboat Elizabeth. The party made the official discovery of Port Davey on the south west coast, and on 28 December of Macquarie Harbour on the central west coast. Features within the harbour were named the Gordon River after the owner of the Elizabeth and Birchs Inlet after Kelly's employer and sponsor T. W. Birch. Birch was granted a monopoly to exploit Huon pine on the west coast as a reward. Birch gave a differing account to the commission of inquiry into the state of the colony in 1820. He said that Port Davey was discovered while on board the Henrietta Packet and that Kelly had discovered Macquarie Harbour after proceeding along in a boat from Port Davey. Kelly also gave evidence to the same commission, and did not mention any discoveries, or contradict the account of Birch.

In November 1817, commanding Birch's Sophia, Kelly sailed on a sealing venture to New Zealand and entered Otago Harbour. With him was William Tucker who had settled in the area in 1815 and was returning. The harbour chief, Korako, would not ferry across Maori from Whareakeake, two miles north along the coast, where Tucker had established himself, and whose people now wished to receive their returning Pakeha's gifts. A few days later, when Kelly, Tucker and five others went in a long boat to Whareakeake they were at first received peaceably but then attacked. Tucker, Veto Viole and John Griffiths, Kelly's brother-in-law, were killed and eaten. Kelly returned to the Sophia still lying in the Otago Harbour and now distrusting Maori there attacked them destroying canoes and burning the "beautiful City of Otago", which he said had 600 houses. Whareakeake became known as "Murdering Beach". Kelly probably exaggerated his revenge but did kill some people and destroyed some property. Unknown to him he had walked into a pre-existing feud the precise cause of which only became known to historians with the discovery of a manuscript in 2003 which gave the long missing Maori side of the story.

In May 1819, Governor Macquarie confirmed Kelly's appointment as pilot and harbourmaster at the Derwent River. In December 1821, as master of the Sophia he assisted in transporting convicts to the newly established penal station at Macquarie Harbour, and in 1825 he helped to set up the secondary penal station on Maria Island. Business interests, mostly in whaling, banking and insurance, saw him resign from Government service in the late 1820s. Eight of the vessels he owned made 24 whaling voyages between 1824 and 1841. One of his sons also went whaling and was killed by a whale in 1842 aged 21.

Kelly's wife died in 1831 and two sons died in 1841 and 1842, respectively. He was financially ruined by the economic depression of the early 1840s and spent most of the remainder of his life back in the employ of the port authorities. He died suddenly in Hobart on 20 April 1859, survived by only three of his ten children.

Kelly's name is perpetuated by a number of geographical features including Kelly's Steps in Battery Point, Hobart, Kelly Basin at Macquarie Harbour, Kelly Island off Forestier Peninsula and Kelly Point on Bruny Island (later renamed Dennes Point).

== Microform ==
- Kelly, James, 1791–1859. First discovery of Port Davey and Macquarie Harbour p. 160–181 "Royal Society of Tasmania : Papers and Proceedings, 1920. Issued separately 24th December, 1920" Microfiche. Canberra : National Library of Australia, 2004. Attended NCGS from 2000 to 2007
