= Whareakeake =

Beach in New Zealand

- Beach
- Interactive map of Whareakeake
- Coordinates: 45°45′43″S 170°40′05″E
- Location: Dunedin, New Zealand

Whareakeake ([ˌfaɾɛˈakɛˌakɛ]; formerly and colloquially Murdering Beach, also "Murderers Beach" or "Murdering Bay") is a beach 25 kilometres (16 mi) northeast of Dunedin in the South Island of New Zealand, as well as the valley above and behind the beach. Located to the west of Aramoana (12 kilometres (7.5 mi) northeast of Port Chalmers) and included as a section of the Otago Heads, Whareakeake was a place of habitation for Māori people from early times until the Sealers' War skirmish of 1817 from which it derived its colonial name. It is now a surfing beach renowned for its right-hand point break.

== Physical geography ==
Whareakeake is approximately 630 metres (2,070 ft) long and faces north-northeast. To the west it ends at the small headland called Pilot Point; to the east, at the cliffs of the much larger Purehurehu Point. Immediately south lie approximately 13 hectares (32 acres) of flat ground, beyond which the land rises steeply on all sides up towards Stone Hill and Hodson Hill. A stream flows down the valley from Hodson Hill and crosses the beach near its eastern end. Beyond Pilot Point lies Long Beach, followed by Pūrākaunui, Mapoutahi, and Blueskin Bay; beyond Purehurehu Point lie Kaikai Beach, Aramoana, Heyward Point, and the mouth of Otago Harbour.

Northeasterly swells, although rare, produce barrelling waves and "mal waves" of great interest to surfers. The tides regularly strew the beach with shells and driftwood.

Access to Whareakeake is by Whareakeake Road (formerly Murdering Beach Road), a steep one-lane gravel drive leading down the side of the Purehurehu Point ridge to the eastern end of the beach.

== History ==
=== Pre-colonial occupation ===
During an 1879 Royal Commission of Inquiry into Ngāi Tahu land claims, a local kaumātua named Taare Wetere Te Kahu identified Whareakeake as a traditional kāinga nohoanga (place of residence) and kāinga mahinga kai (place of food production). Other older Māori people at the time recalled "a fenced fort, a cemetery, a sacred altar and a canoe anchorage."

At least two archaeological sites are present: a site with moa bones well back from the shoreline, which has received very little study, and a Classic Māori site, now thoroughly excavated, extending into the sand dunes. The latter site consists of four occupation layers of which even the oldest contains no moa bone. Artefacts from it – including fish-hooks, weapons, and amulets – have been used as type specimens of the Classic period. An unrivalled quantity of pounamu artefacts was excavated from Whareakeake in the 1880s and 1890s. One artefact found in the surface layer in 1863 was a medal given out by Captain James Cook during his second voyage to New Zealand, and most likely subsequently traded from Queen Charlotte Sound for pounamu. Due to extensive fossicking it is difficult to analyse the changes in this site across time.

=== The Sealers' War incident ===
In December 1817 the Sophia, a Hobart sealing ship carrying prospective settlers, anchored in Otago Harbour. Its captain James Kelly and a few others went to visit Whareakeake (then known to Europeans as "Small Bay") in an open boat. Among them was a settler named William Tucker, who had built a house at Whareakeake two years previously, where he ran an export business in ornamental hei-tiki (pounamu neck pendants). At first they were welcomed, but when Tucker went into his house, the locals attacked Kelly, at the instigation of the chief Te Matahaere. In the ensuing melee three of the settlers were killed, including Tucker himself, who made it back to the boat but lingered in the surf begging his attackers not to hurt him before being "cut limb from limb". All the dead were eaten.

Kelly and the other survivors of the attack rowed back to the Sophia. He and his men then proceeded to kill large numbers of Māori, including a local chief named Korako. Their subsequent report claimed that the Māori had boarded the Sophia and were killed in the fight to retake it, and that Korako was captured and shot when he attempted to escape; historians caution that Kelly's account of events, made to justify the actions he took, exaggerates the danger he and his men were in. He went on to destroy multiple canoes and set fire to "the beautiful city of Otago". This probably refers to Ōtākou, on the other side of the harbour; however, the Whareakeake village does seem to have been burned at around the same time, and abandoned rather than rebuilt. A tapu was placed on the site and lifted in the 1860s.

The motive for the attack at Whareakeake is unclear. Kelly believed it was a reprisal for previous shootings of Māori by Europeans in the ongoing state of lawless conflict known as the Sealers' War. A later account accused Tucker of having stolen a Māori preserved head in 1811 and inaugurated the trade in these items; this is considered to be poorly evidenced. Local Māori tradition has it that the trouble arose over the Sophia's crew's treatment of the women at Ōtākou.

Whareakeake was thereafter occupied by a succession of European households, and informally referred to as "Driver's Beach" or "Coleman's Beach" after two of them. However, on the first surveying map of the district (dated 1863) it was labelled "Murdering Beach". This remained its official designation until 1998, when the name Whareakeake was restored in the Ngāi Tahu Claims Settlement Act.

== Present use ==
Whareakeake is a relatively quiet beach owing to the difficulty of access by road. It is a favoured spot for swimming, sunbathing, and scenery-gazing.

Due to its right-hand point break, Whareakeake is one of four surf breaks of national significance in Otago – the others being at Karitane, Papatowai, and Spit Beach at Aramoana. It is considered suitable for intermediate to expert surfers. When the swell is northeasterly, the beach can become crowded with surfers, as these opportunities are rare.

Whareakeake is frequently used by naturists for nude bathing. New Zealand has no official nude beaches, as public nudity is legal on any beach where it is "known to occur".
