= Young Lachlan =

Australian schooner

History
- Name: Henrietta Packet (??-1818); Young Lachlan (1818-1819)
- Fate: Wrecked in 1819

General characteristics
- Type: Schooner
- Propulsion: Sail

The Young Lachlan was a schooner that was stolen and wrecked by convicts in 1819. Between 1812 and 1817 as the Henrietta Packet it provided passenger and cargo transport between colonial ports, and was possibly involved in exploration in the present-day Tasmania.

== Henrietta Packet ==
The schooner was originally constructed as the Henrietta Packet.

James Kelly was employed by Thomas Birch as master in March 1814. Birch claimed to have discovered Port Davey on 22 December 1815 while on board the Henrietta Packet. This account is contradicted by a later published journal of James Kelly claiming to have discovered both Port Davey and Macquarie Harbour in the whaleboat Elizabeth.

== Young Lachlan ==
In October 1818 the schooner was purchased by a Captain Howard, who lengthened the ship and renamed it the Young Lachlan.

== Theft by convicts ==
On the night of 27 February 1819 the Young Lachlan was moored outside Captain Howard's residence on the River Derwent, Hobart, Tasmania. Around midnight a group of thirteen convicts, four of them seamen, boarded the ship and stole it. The ship was never seen again. Four sailors who were aboard at the time of the theft were found on Bruny Island by James Kelly who had pursued in the brig Sophia. The convicts sailed as far as Angier Point, on the island of Java. There they burnt the schooner and sought refuge as shipwrecked sailors. The Dutch government gave some necessities but soon realized they were not legitimate. They were imprisoned in the great jail at Batavia. Some of the convicts died in jail. Five were returned by the ship St Michael to Hobart via Calcutta in 1821, where they were tried. Malcolm Campbell, probably the leader of the group, did a deal in which he agreed to give evidence against his fellow convicts to avoid conviction. He avoided conviction and stayed in Hobart Town as a convict. The other four convicts (Daniel Clark, Samuel O'Hara, Patrick Cotton and Christopher Read) were found guilty of ship stealing and, on 25 January 1821, sentenced to death. However, their death sentence was commuted and the four men were instead transported to a penal station in NSW (probably at Port Macquarie). From evidence they provided during their trial, it appears that the Young Lachlan had been wrecked off an island in Java and burnt to the waterline. It is unclear what happened to the remaining convicts. For the convicts who died in Batavia or simply disappeared, theirs was one of the few (if not ill-fated) escapes from Van Diemen's Land.
