= Kelly's Steps =

Landmark in Hobart, Tasmania, Australia

- Stairway
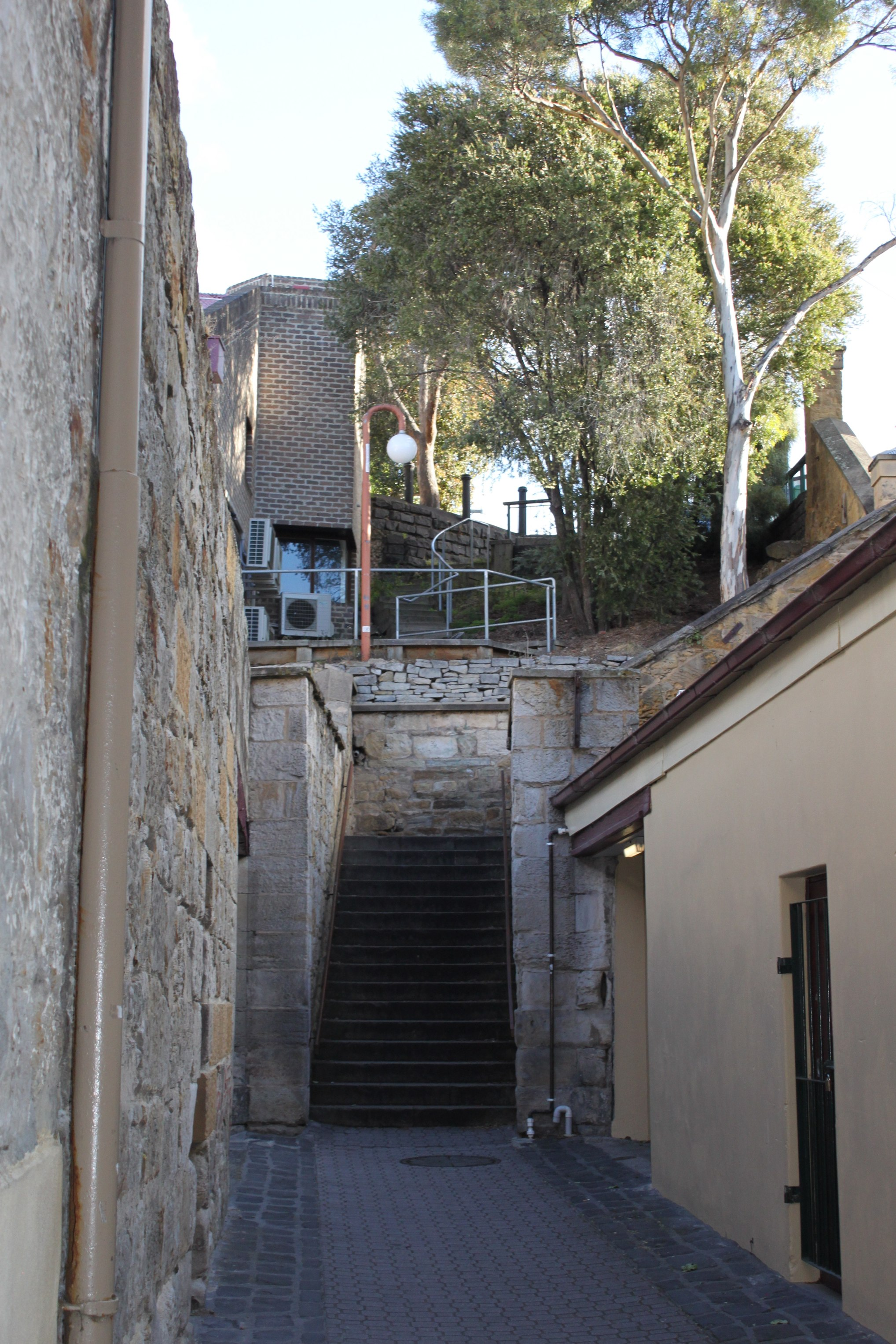
- Kelly's Steps
- Design: James Kelly
- Constructed: 1839–1840
- Steps: 48
- Surface: sandstone blocks
- Location: Hobart, Tasmania
- Hobart
- Coordinates: 42°53′14″S 147°17′57″E

Kelly's Steps is an architectural landmark in Hobart, Tasmania. The steps, named after early Australian explorer and whaler James Kelly, connect the suburb of Battery Point to Salamanca Place. At the time Kelly constructed the steps in 1839, Battery Point was on a cliff that overlooked wharfs of Sullivans Cove. The steps were cut into the stone of the cliffs. The warehouses that lined the wharfs on what is now Salamanca Place were built with stone quarried from the cliffs. The steps lead up to Kelly Street, Battery Point. At the foot of the steps, Kelly's Lane leads to Salamanca Place.
