= David MacNish =

David MacNish (c. 1812 – 10 April 1863) was a New Zealand interpreter, labourer, bricklayer, farmer and Pākehā Māori. He was born in Trelawny Parish, Jamaica in 1812 or 1813, the son of a Scottish-born estate overseer, David MacNish Sr. and Rebecca Mulloy, a slave woman of mixed Irish and African ancestry — so he was also a slave, until manumitted by his father in 1820.

He was educated in Scotland and England, and travelled to India and Australia before settling in New Zealand at Raglan Harbour and marrying Te Ani, the daughter of the local paramount chief, Te Moanaroa. They had seven children, all of whom went by the slightly altered surname, McNeish.
