= Te Kura Kaupapa Māori o Ngā Taonga Tūturu ki Tokomaru =

Location
- 11 Moana Street, Tokomaru Bay, New Zealand; 38°07′38″S 178°18′56″E

Information
- Type: State, co-educational, primary, Māori immersion
- Established: 1991; 35 years ago
- Ministry of Education Institution no.: 4218
- Enrolment: 21 (July 2026)
- Socio-economic decile: 3
- Website: tkkmotokomaru.school.nz

Te Kura Kaupapa Māori o Ngā Taonga Tūturu ki Tokomaru is a kura kaupapa Māori (Māori-language immersion primary school) located in Tokomaru Bay, New Zealand. Established on 11 February 1991, the school was the first full-immersion Māori medium school in Te Tai Rāwhiti (the Gisborne District). The school celebrated its 30th anniversary in 2021.

Since 1999, students from the school have joined with others from Tolaga Bay Area School, Kahukuranui, and Te Kura Kaupapa Māori o Ngā Uri ā Māui to form a combined cultural group, Ngā Taiohi a Hauiti, that competes at national school kapa haka events.

The school was damaged during floods across the Gisborne Region in March 2022. A 120-year-old tōtara tree was uprooted, causing a bank to collapse to within 0.5 m (1 ft 8 in) of the school's basketball court.

In July 2026, the school's roll was 21.
