= Jacky Marmon =

Australian sailor (c.1798–1880)

John Marmon, known as Jacky Marmon (1798-1800?–1880), was an Australian sailor, who became one of the first Europeans to live as a Pākehā Māori. His occupations included interpreter, shopkeeper, sawyer, carpenter and soldier.

Jacky Marmon

== Early life ==
Marmon was born in Sydney, New South Wales, the son of a convict stonemason of Irish descent. If Marmon's own account is to be believed, he first went to sea on a whaling vessel at 5 years of age, visiting Bay of Islands New Zealand in 1805 before returning to Sydney. He went to sea again at the age of 11, and sailed in merchant vessels throughout the Pacific and between the Australian colonies.

In 1823 he was convicted of theft and sentenced to serve two years on government ships. From one of these he escaped while it was berthed in the north of New Zealand.

== Life with the Māori ==
In Hokianga Marmon lived under the protection of the local chief Muriwai and married the daughter of another. He became fluent in Māori and travelled on the Ngāpuhi raids on the Hokianga under the leadership of Hongi Hika.

He attempted unsuccessfully to convince Hokianga Maori not to sign the Treaty of Waitangi in 1840, but later during the period now known as the Flagstaff War he and the Hokianga Māori supported the British troops and Tāmati Wāka Nene; with Marmon himself recovering the bodies of the Europeans slain during the Battle of Ohaeawai.

His relationships with the European population were always tainted by the suggestion that he had taken part in cannibal feasts in his early raids with the Māori.

He died at Rawhia on 3 September 1880 and the next year many newspapers serialised his autobiography as "The life and adventures of John Marmon, the Hokianga Pakeha Maori, or, seventy-five years in New Zealand". Marmon's final resting place is unknown, but believed to be on Rawhia Point. Now lined with pine trees, now considered somewhat of a sacred area and locals have refused to log the area.
