= Tokomaru Bay =

Town in the North Island of New Zealand

- Town
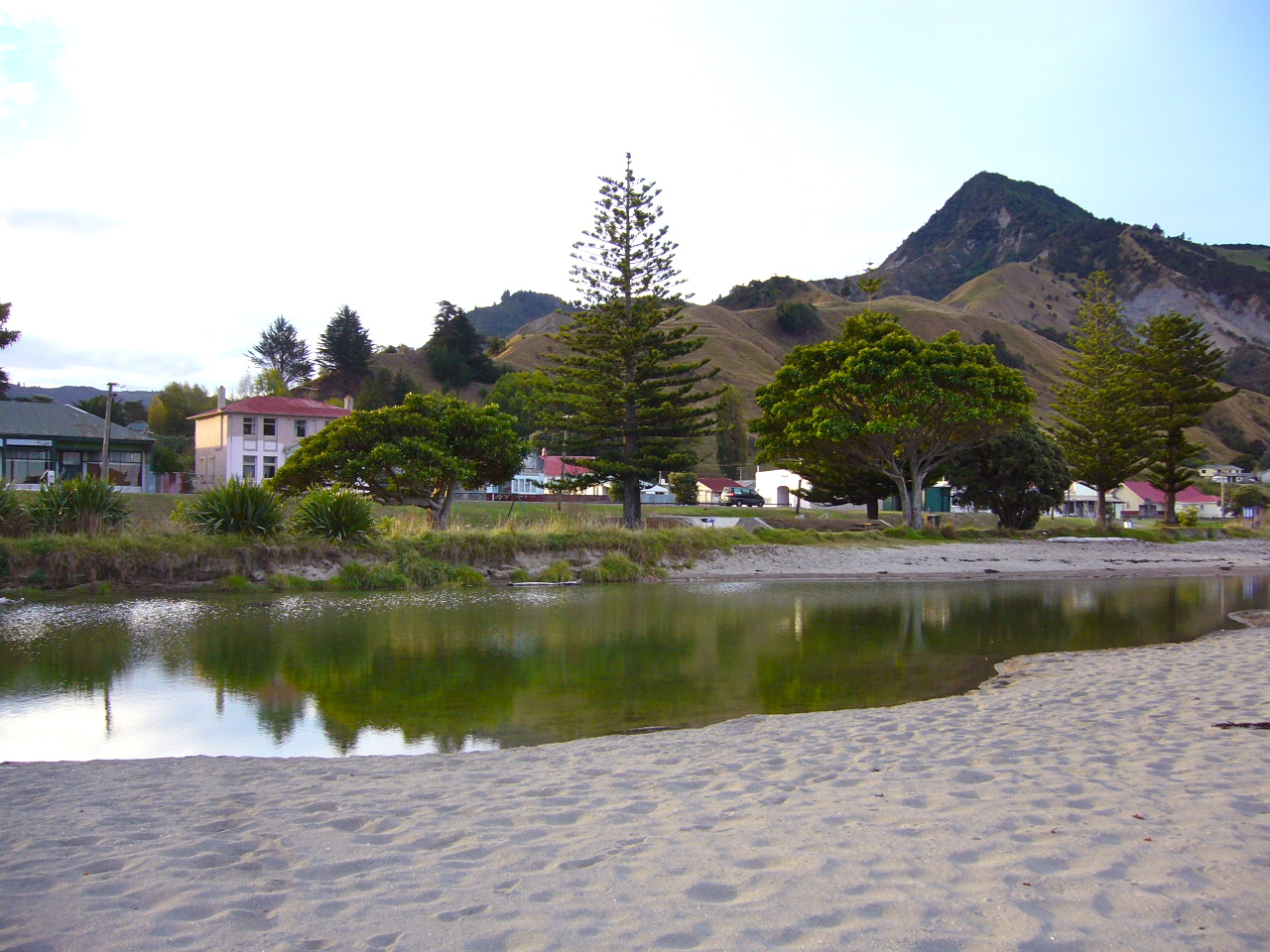
- Tokomaru Bay
- Interactive map of Tokomaru Bay
- Coordinates: 38°08′S 178°18′E
- Country: New Zealand
- Territorial authority: Gisborne District
- Ward: Tairāwhiti General Ward
- Electorates: East Cape; Ikaroa-Rāwhiti (Māori)

Government
  - Territorial authority: Gisborne District Council
  - Mayor of Gisborne: Rehette Stoltz
  - East Cape MP: Dana Kirkpatrick
  - Ikaroa-Rāwhiti MP: Cushla Tangaere-Manuel

Area
  - Total: 8.38 km^{2} (3.24 sq mi)

Population (June 2025)
  - Total: 490
  - Density: 58/km^{2} (150/sq mi)
- Postcode(s): 4079

Tokomaru Bay is a small beachside community on the remote East Coast of New Zealand's North Island. It is 91 km north of Gisborne, on State Highway 35, and close to Mount Hikurangi. The district was originally known as Toka-a-Namu, which refers to the abundance of sandflies. Over the years the name was altered to Tokomaru Bay.

The two hapu or sub-tribes that reside in Tokomaru Bay are Te Whanau a Ruataupare and Te Whānau a Te Aotawarirangi. The ancestral mountain of Tokomaru Bay is Toiroa. The ancestral river is Mangahauini.

== History and culture ==
The seven-kilometre wide bay is small but sheltered, and was a calling place for passenger ships until the early 20th century. Captain Cook spent time here on his 1769 journey of discovery, and later European settlement included a whaling station. A visit by missionaries William Williams, William Colenso, Richard Matthews and James Stack heralded the coming of Christianity to the district in 1838 and their crusade proved very successful with the local people.

The area around the bay has long been a Māori stronghold. The nearby pā at Te Mawhai was refortified by Henare Potae in the 1860s during the battles between the Ngāti Porou and the warriors that followed the Pai Mārire movement (commonly known as Hauhau).

The town's modern economy is mainly based on agriculture and forestry, with some tourism.

Tokomaru Bay's population is predominantly Māori, with the area being a stronghold for the Ngāti Porou iwi.

Southern right whales sometimes come into bay to calve or rest.

== Demographics ==
Stats NZ describes Tokomaru Bay as a rural settlement, which covers 8.38 km^{2} (3.24 sq mi). It had an estimated population of 490 as of June 2025, with a population density of 58 people per km^{2}. It is part of the larger Tokomaru statistical area.

Historical population for Tokomaru Bay
Year	Pop.	±% p.a.
2006	498	—
2013	432	−2.01%
2018	444	+0.55%
2023	483	+1.70%

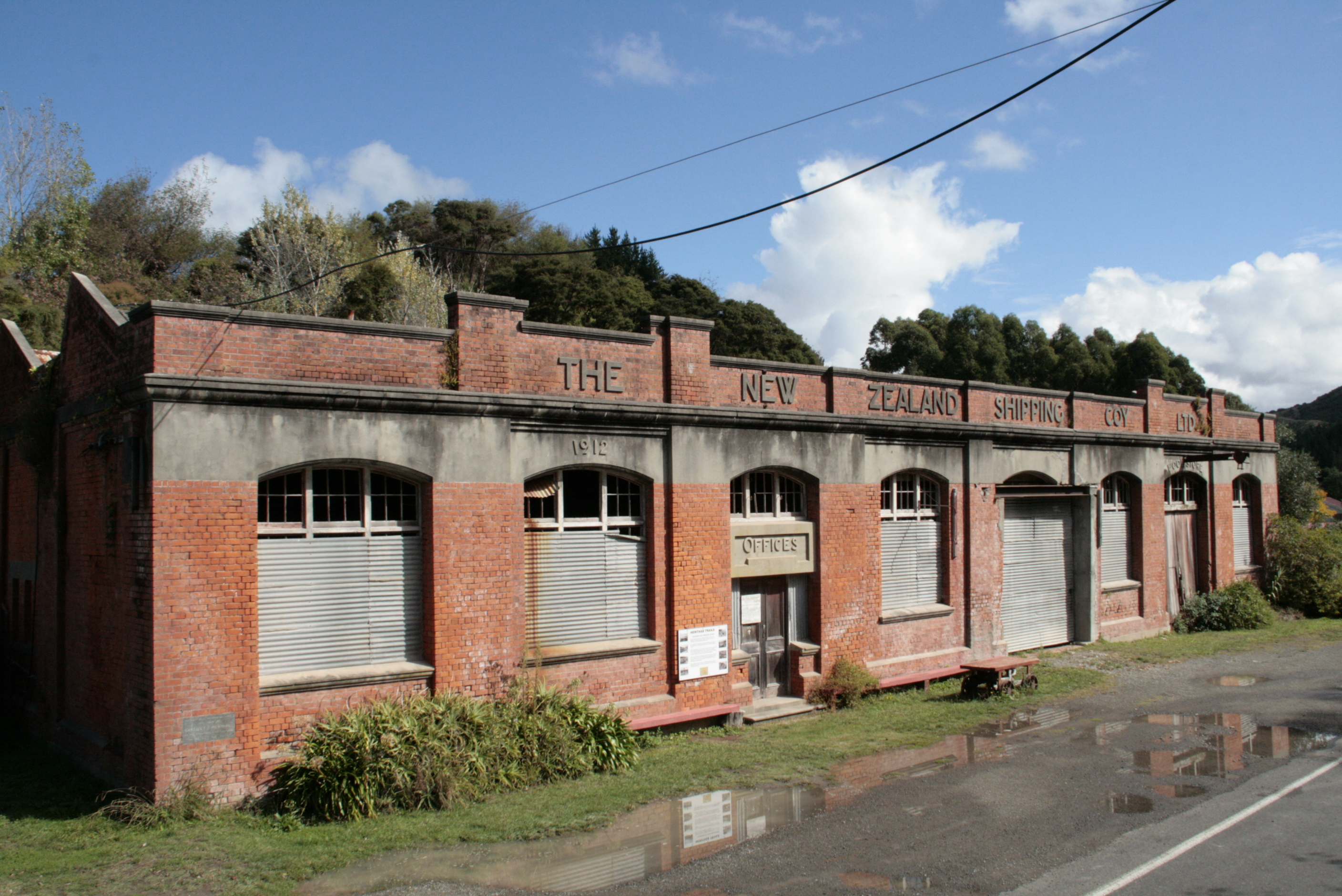
Former New Zealand Shipping Company store

Tokomaru Bay had a population of 483 in the 2023 New Zealand census, an increase of 39 people (8.8%) since the 2018 census, and an increase of 51 people (11.8%) since the 2013 census. There were 237 males and 246 females in 183 dwellings. 1.2% of people identified as LGBTIQ+. The median age was 46.4 years (compared with 38.1 years nationally). There were 111 people (23.0%) aged under 15 years, 54 (11.2%) aged 15 to 29, 210 (43.5%) aged 30 to 64, and 111 (23.0%) aged 65 or older.

People could identify as more than one ethnicity. The results were 36.0% European (Pākehā), 86.3% Māori, 7.5% Pasifika, 1.9% Asian, and 1.2% other, which includes people giving their ethnicity as "New Zealander". English was spoken by 96.9%, Māori by 43.5%, and other languages by 3.1%. No language could be spoken by 2.5% (e.g. too young to talk). New Zealand Sign Language was known by 2.5%. The percentage of people born overseas was 3.7, compared with 28.8% nationally.

Religious affiliations were 36.0% Christian, 10.6% Māori religious beliefs, and 0.6% other religions. People who answered that they had no religion were 44.1%, and 11.2% of people did not answer the census question.

Of those at least 15 years old, 57 (15.3%) people had a bachelor's or higher degree, 207 (55.6%) had a post-high school certificate or diploma, and 105 (28.2%) people exclusively held high school qualifications. The median income was $28,000, compared with $41,500 nationally. 18 people (4.8%) earned over $100,000 compared to 12.1% nationally. The employment status of those at least 15 was 132 (35.5%) full-time, 51 (13.7%) part-time, and 18 (4.8%) unemployed.

=== Tokomaru statistical area ===
Tokomaru statistical area covers 1,144.91 km^{2} (442.05 sq mi) and had an estimated population of 1,040 as of June 2025, with a population density of 0.91 people per km^{2}.

Historical population for Tokomaru statistical area
Year	Pop.	±% p.a.
2006	1,056	—
2013	933	−1.75%
2018	954	+0.45%
2023	1,029	+1.53%

Tokomaru had a population of 1,029 in the 2023 New Zealand census, an increase of 75 people (7.9%) since the 2018 census, and an increase of 96 people (10.3%) since the 2013 census. There were 522 males and 507 females in 381 dwellings. 1.2% of people identified as LGBTIQ+. The median age was 42.4 years (compared with 38.1 years nationally). There were 222 people (21.6%) aged under 15 years, 153 (14.9%) aged 15 to 29, 444 (43.1%) aged 30 to 64, and 213 (20.7%) aged 65 or older.

People could identify as more than one ethnicity. The results were 33.5% European (Pākehā); 86.3% Māori; 6.4% Pasifika; 1.5% Asian; 0.3% Middle Eastern, Latin American and African New Zealanders (MELAA); and 0.6% other, which includes people giving their ethnicity as "New Zealander". English was spoken by 95.0%, Māori by 41.1%, Samoan by 0.3%, and other languages by 2.0%. No language could be spoken by 2.3% (e.g. too young to talk). New Zealand Sign Language was known by 1.7%. The percentage of people born overseas was 3.5, compared with 28.8% nationally.

Religious affiliations were 36.2% Christian, 9.0% Māori religious beliefs, 0.3% New Age, and 0.9% other religions. People who answered that they had no religion were 44.9%, and 9.9% of people did not answer the census question.

Of those at least 15 years old, 108 (13.4%) people had a bachelor's or higher degree, 453 (56.1%) had a post-high school certificate or diploma, and 255 (31.6%) people exclusively held high school qualifications. The median income was $27,700, compared with $41,500 nationally. 30 people (3.7%) earned over $100,000 compared to 12.1% nationally. The employment status of those at least 15 was 300 (37.2%) full-time, 108 (13.4%) part-time, and 45 (5.6%) unemployed.

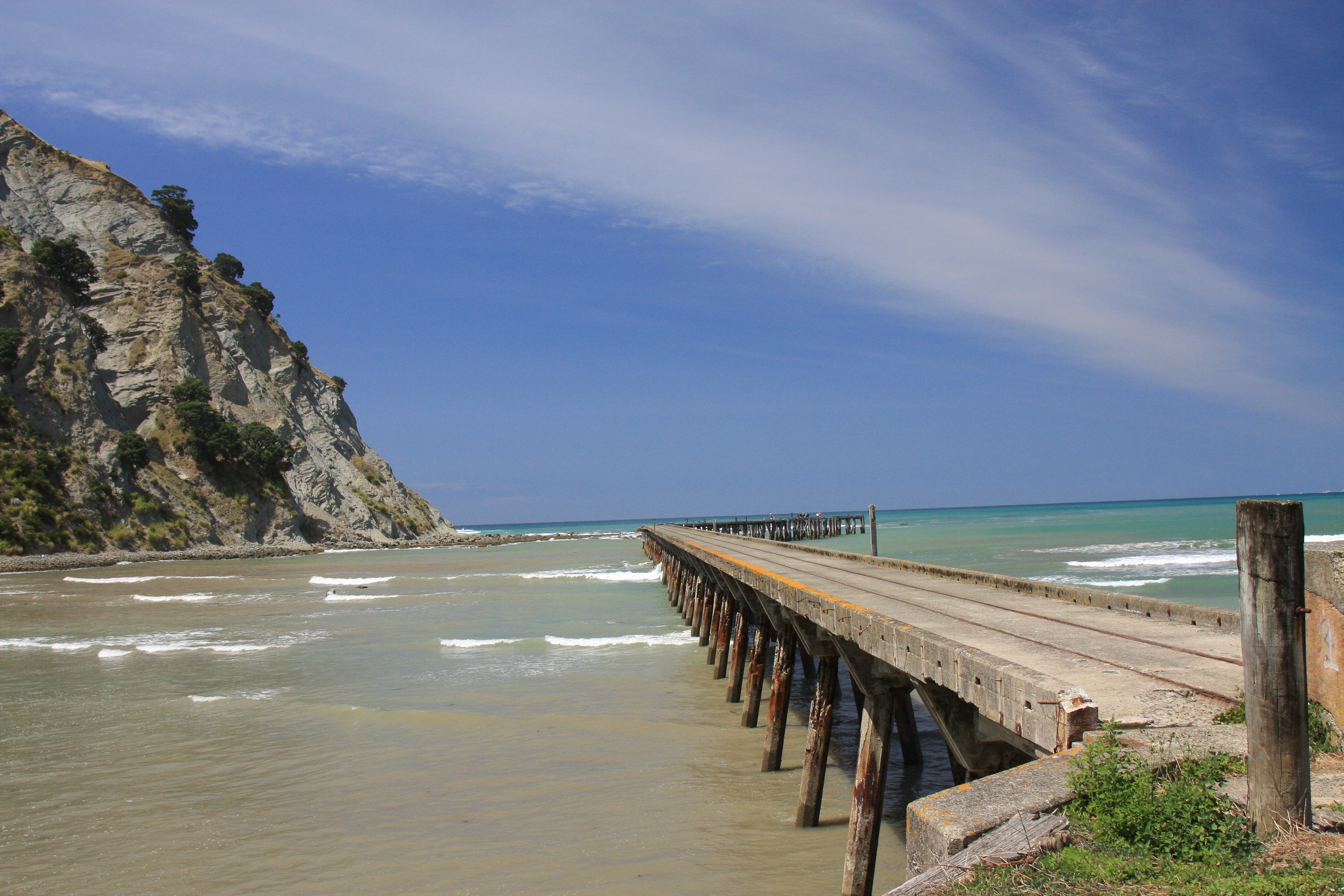
Wharf at Tokomaru Bay

=== Marae ===
Te Whānau a Ruataupare ki Tokomaru, a hapū of Ngāti Porou, has three meeting places in the area: Pakirikiri Marae and Te Hono ki Rarotonga meeting house, Tuatini Marae and Huiwhenua meeting house, and Waiparapara Marae and Te Poho o Te Tikanga meeting house.

In October 2020, the Government committed $5,756,639 from the Provincial Growth Fund to upgrade Pakirikiri, Tuatini, Waiparapara, and 26 other Ngāti Porou marae. The funding was expected to create 205 jobs.

Te Ariuru Marae and Te Poho o Te Aotawarirangi meeting house, located in the northern bay, is a meeting place of another Ngāti Porouhapū hapū, Te Whānau a Te Aotawarirangi.

== Parks ==
Hatea-A-Rangi Memorial Park is Tokomaru Bay's sports ground and local park.

== Education ==
Hatea-A-Rangi is a Year 1–8 state school with a roll of 16. It traces its origins to Tokomaru Bay Native School which opened in 1872. The Native School merged with Tokomaru Bay Public School in 1949 to form Tokomaru Bay District High School. Hatea-A-Rangi celebrated its 150th jubilee in 2022.

Mata School, located inland from Tokomaru Bay, is a Year 1–8 state primary school with a roll of 5.

Te Kura Kaupapa Māori o Ngā Taonga Tūturu ki Tokomaru is a year 1–8 Kura kaupapa Māori school. It has a roll of 21. It opened in 1991.

All these schools are co-educational. School rolls are as of July 2026.

== Notable people ==
- Tokomaru Bay was the birthplace of Ngoi Pēwhairangi, famous Māori composer and performance artist, and former All Black's Buff Milner And Jhon Collins
- Hākaraia Pāhewa
