= Bardaster (1833 ship) =

Sailing ship carrying convicts

History

United Kingdom
- Name: Bardaster
- Builder: New Brunswick
- Launched: 1833
- Fate: Broken up 1840

General characteristics
- Tons burthen: 435 (bm)

Bardaster was launched in New Brunswick in 1833. She spent her career sailing between England and Australia and New Zealand. She transported convicts to Tasmania in 1835–1836, and was broken up in 1840.

== Career ==
Bardaster first appeared in Lloyd's Register (LR) in 1835 with Chalmers, master, and homeport of Liverpool.

In October 1834 Bardaster, Captain John Thomas Chalmers, arrived at Tolaga Bay, New Zealand.

Convict transport: Captain Alexander McDonald sailed from Portsmouth on 16 September 1835. Bardaster arrived at Tasmania on 13 January 1836. She had embarked 240 male convicts and she landed 235, having suffered five convict deaths en route. From there she sailed on to Sydney, before returning to England.

Bardaster, Captain John Virtue, left London on 7 October 1838, and arrived at Port Adelaide on 22 January 1839. There she delivered a number of immigrants before she sailed on to Sydney.

Lloyd's Register for 1840, showed Bardaster with Vertue, master, and trade London–Sydney. It noted that she underwent small repairs in 1837, and that she "wants repair". It also carried the later annotation "Broken up".
