= James Caddell =

James Caddell (c. 1794 – c.1826) was a New Zealand Pākehā Māori, sealer and interpreter. In late 1810 Caddell was the only survivor from the sealer Sydney Cove boat crew which was captured by local Māori at the mouth of the Clutha River. The other five crewmen were killed. He later married Tokitoki, the daughter of a local chief and took a full moko (facial tattoo). It has been suggested that Cadell's voyages to Port Jackson in 1823 may have contributed to the ending of the Sealers' War. The last record of him is 24 March 1826 and his ultimate fate is unknown.
