= Pākehā Māori =

European settlers who lived alongside Māori

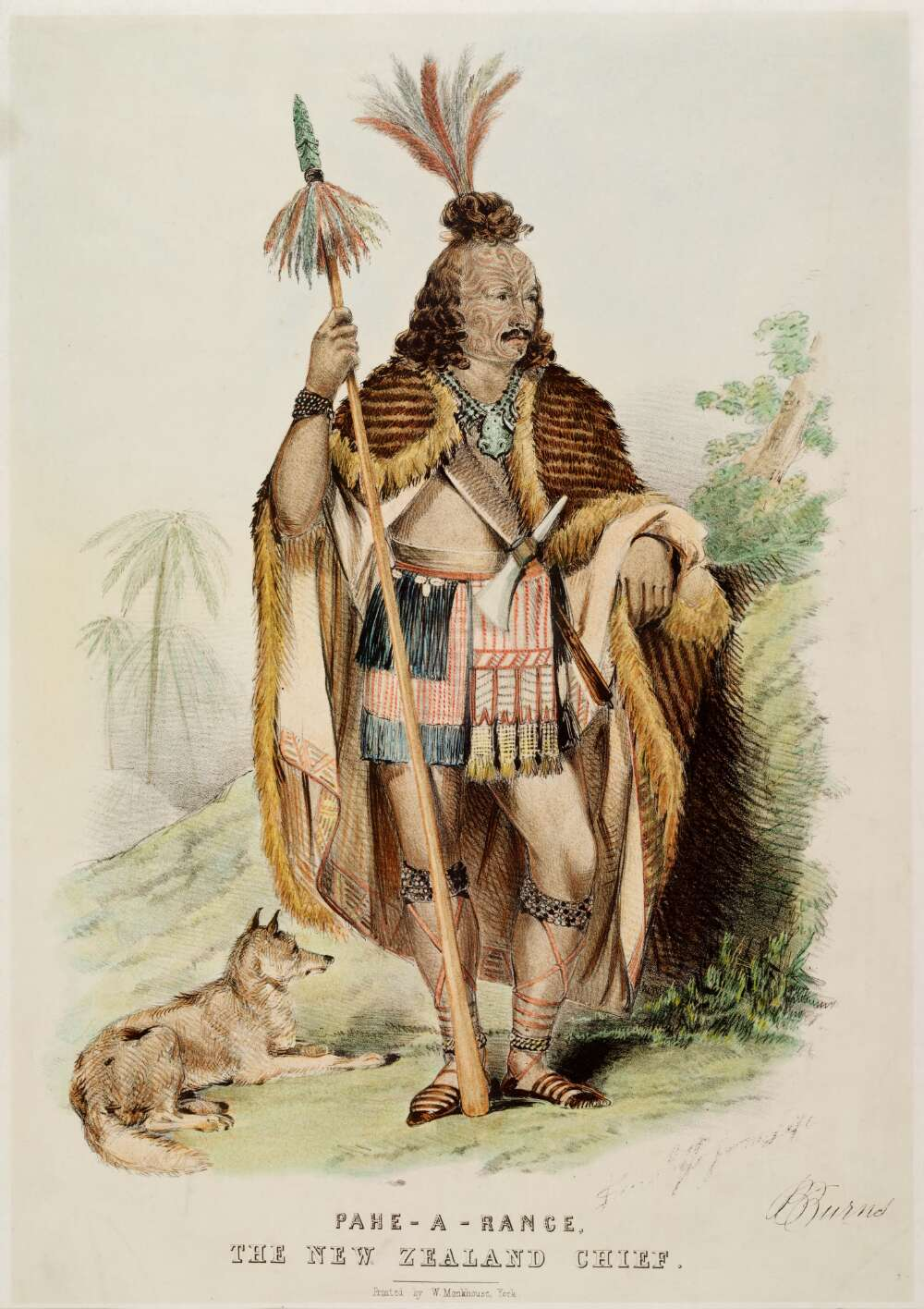
Barnet Burns in Māori clothing, image from National Library of Australia

Pākehā Māori or Pakeha Maori were early European settlers (known as Pākehā in the Māori language) who lived among the Māori in New Zealand.

== History ==
Many Pākehā Māori were runaway seamen or escaped Australian convicts who settled in Māori communities by choice.

A few Pākehā Māori such as James Caddell, John Rutherford and Barnet Burns even received moko (facial tattoos).

In 1862 and 1863, the early settler Frederick Edward Maning published two books under the pseudonym "A Pakeha Maori" in which he describes how they lived.

== Notable Pākehā Māori ==
- Kimball Bent
- Barnet Burns
- James Caddell
- Thomas Kendall
- David MacNish
- Frederick Edward Maning
- Jacky Marmon
- John Rutherford

== See also ==
- Māori Indians
- Charlotte Badger
- Manuel José (trader)

=== Similar people in other countries ===
- Jim Bridger
- Caramuru
- Isaac Davis
- Gonzalo Guerrero
- John Young
