= Long Beach, New Zealand =

Coordinates: 45°45′S 170°38′E

Long Beach, known in Māori as Wharauwerawera or Wharewerawera is a small coastal settlement in Otago, New Zealand comprising approximately 100 homes. Many of the sections were initially auctioned in October 1922 for a pound deposit. It is located within the city limits of Dunedin, and lies 15 kilometres northeast of the city centre, between Blueskin Bay and the mouth of the Otago Harbour. The small settlement of Pūrākaunui is located nearby.

Long Beach township is near a sandy beach that stretches 2.4 kilometres between coastal rock formations. Wildlife in the beach and lagoon area includes blue penguins, seals, terns, pūkeko, herons, spoonbills, and ducks. Because the beach lies within a bay and is seldom affected by swells, it is a common swimming location. Rock-climbing cliffs and caves at the beach's western end also attract many visitors. The Mopanui Ecological Society, a Long Beach community group, has been extensively beautifying the area through mass planting of native flora in reserve areas.

Some of the earliest traces of human settlement in the South Island are from nearby Kaikai Beach, just to the northwest of Long Beach.

The 2006 movie Out of the Blue was primarily filmed at Long Beach.
