= Otago Heads =

Coordinates: 45°47′00″S 170°43′15″E

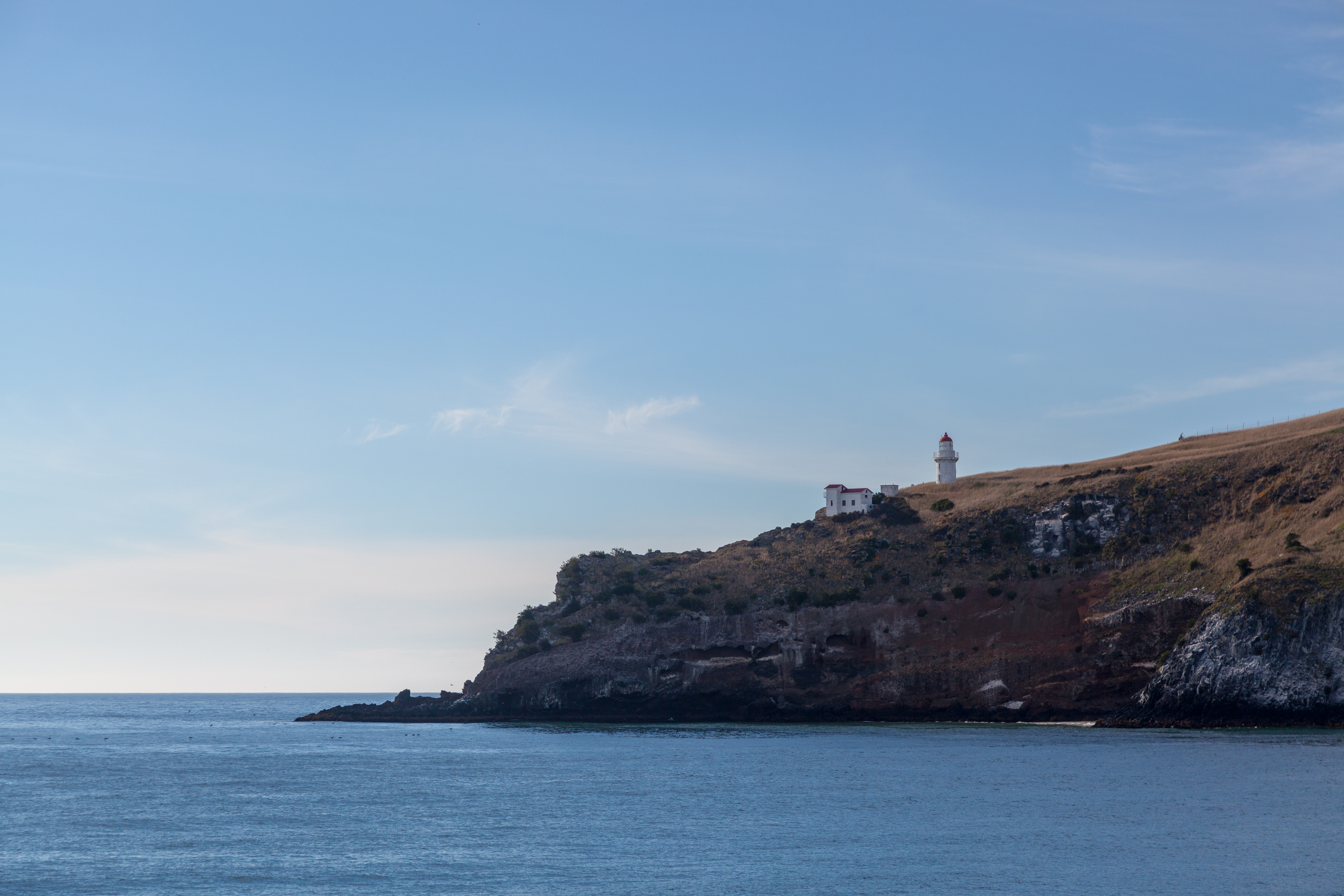
Taiaroa Head as seen from the Aramoana Mole.

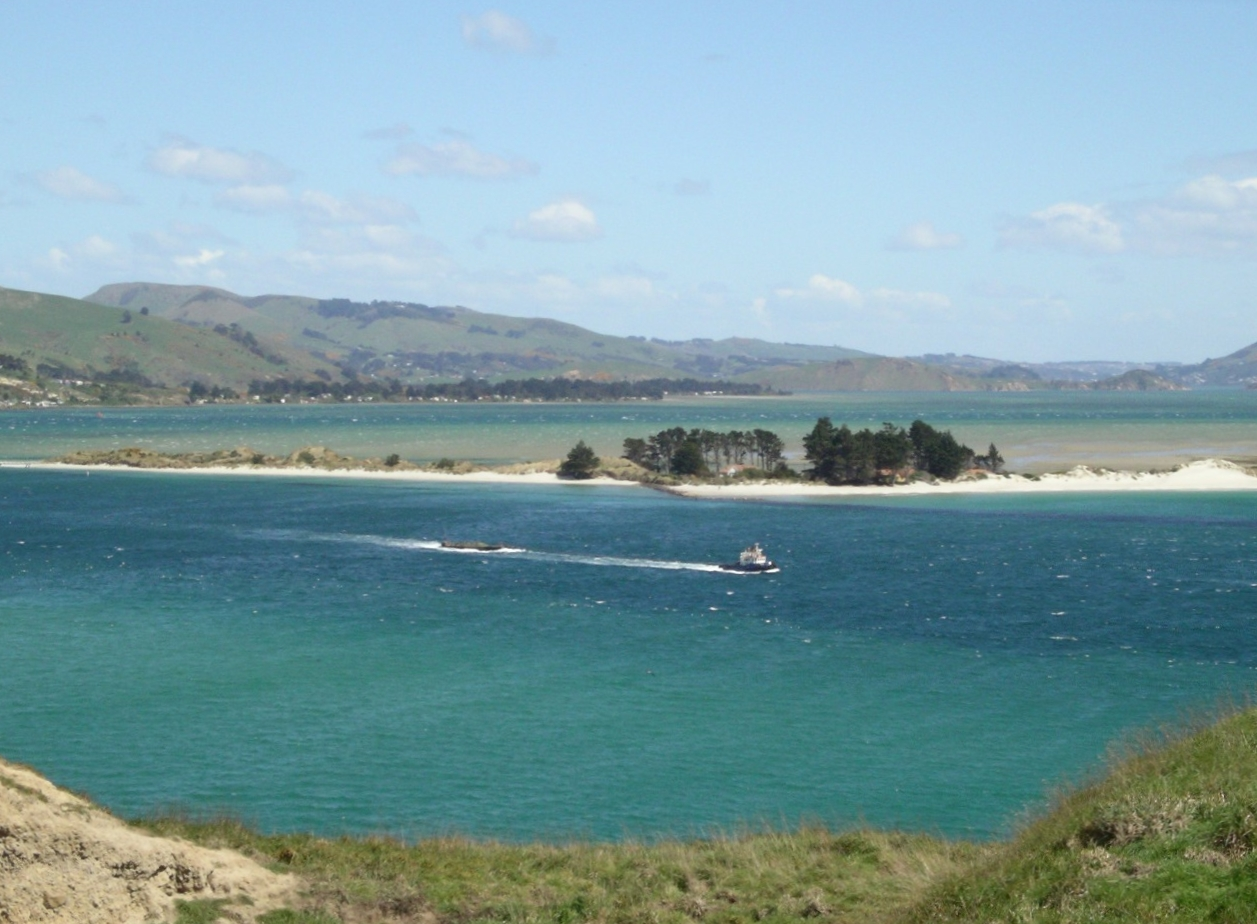
Aramoana mudflats as seen from Taiaroa Head. The harbour entrance is 400 metres wide at its narrowest point.

The Otago Heads is the historic name given to the headlands and coastal settlements close to the mouth of the long drowned volcanic rift which forms the Otago Harbour, in the South Island of New Zealand.

The name has traditionally referred primarily to the settlements and headlands on the Otago Peninsula coast just inside the mouth of the harbour, from Taiaroa Head to Ōtākou, and to the settlements outside the harbour immediately to the north of its mouth, including Aramoana, Long Beach, and the former historic settlement at Whareakeake. In a broader sense, the term also sometimes included the parts of the Pacific coast of Otago Peninsula closest to Taiaroa Head, including Pipikaretu Beach, Penguin Beach, and Rerewahine Point.

These sites were locations of early liaison between the first European settlers in Otago and local Māori; the settlement of Ōtākou was an important settlement prior to the founding of the city of Dunedin, at the far end of the harbour, in 1848. The heads had been an important Māori site prior to the arrival of Europeans, and are of archaeological significance.

At its narrowest, between the Aramoana mudflats and Harington Point, the harbour mouth is 400 metres in width, and — with the exception of the Victoria Channel — much of the harbour is shallow. The narrowness of the harbour entrance and the large traffic, especially during the Otago gold rush of the 1860s, are responsible for a large number of shipwrecks and other marine incidents close to the heads. The heads are guarded by Taiaroa Head Lighthouse.

The Otago Heads were the site of one of the southern signings of New Zealand's founding document, the Treaty of Waitangi, in 1840.
