= Shiel Hill =

Suburb of Dunedin, New Zealand

- Suburb
- Interactive map of Shiel Hill
- Coordinates: 45.8916°S 170.5393°E
- Country: New Zealand
- City: Dunedin
- Local authority: Dunedin City Council

Area
  - Land: 137 ha (340 acres)

Population (June 2025)
  - Total: 1,840
  - Density: 1,340/km^{2} (3,480/sq mi)

Waverley		The Cove
Vauxhall	Shiel Hill
Andersons Bay	Ocean Grove

Shiel Hill is a residential suburb of the New Zealand city of Dunedin. It is located at the southeastern edge of the city's urban area, 3.2 kilometres (2.0 mi) southeast of the city's centre at the western end of the Otago Peninsula, close to the isthmus joining the peninsula to the mainland. As the name suggests, it is situated on the slopes of a hill at the start of the ridge which runs along the spine of the peninsula. The slopes rise to a series of crests generally known collectively as Highcliff, a name also often applied to the last suburban vestiges which remain as Dunedin's urban area becomes the rural land of the peninsula. More accurately, the name is that of a cliff which lies on the Pacific coast of the peninsula 4 kilometres (2.5 mi) east of Shiel Hill.

The suburb is almost entirely residential, though there are some retail premises on the suburb's main road, Highcliff Road. These include a small nexus of shops at the southwestern edge of Shiel Hill, at the point where the suburb joins the neighbouring suburb of Andersons Bay. At this point, there is a road junction, with the western end of Highcliff Road meeting four other roads, notably Silverton Street (which leads down into Andersons Bay and is the main route from Shiel Hill to central Dunedin) and Tomahawk Road (which leads to Dunedin's Pacific coastal suburbs of Tahuna and Ocean Grove).

Notable features of Shiel hill include Rotary Park, a small public reserve surrounding reservoirs which serve the Peninsula hill suburbs. This park is located above steep slopes which drop 166 metres (545 ft) to the waters of the Otago Harbour close to The Cove, half a kilometre to the north of the park. From Rotary Park, views can be obtained across and along the harbour to central Dunedin to the northwest, Signal Hill to the north, and Port Chalmers to the northeast.

The suburb of Shiel Hill hit the news headlines in Dunedin in 1995 after one of Dunedin's most notorious crimes was committed in Every Street, close to the boundary of Shiel Hill and Andersons Bay. The case, in which five of the six members of the Bain family were slain led to one of New Zealand's most prominent causes célèbres after the remaining member of the family, David Bain was arrested for the murders despite evidence indicating that the slayings may well have been a murder-suicide by his father Robin. David Bain was found guilty and served 13 years of a life sentence before succeeding in having the case reopened. His retrial, in 2009, resulted in a verdict of not guilty.

== Highcliff ==
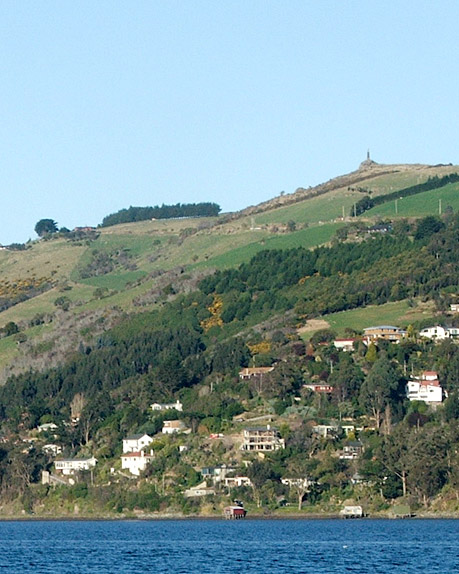
The small settlement of Challis sits at the harbour's edge below the Otago Peninsula Fallen Soldiers' Memorial, a major local landmark.

East from Shiel Hill, Highcliff Road meets with McKerrow Street (which connects Shiel Hill with the neighbouring suburb of Waverley, before continuing along the spine of the peninsula, eventually descending at Portobello. Most parts of the peninsula between central Dunedin and Portobello which do not lie on the Otago Harbour coast are primarily accessible from this road. These places include Sandfly Bay, Pukehiki, Boulder Beach, and Hoopers Inlet. A second road to Ocean Grove, Centre Road, meets Highcliff Road 1.6 kilometres (0.99 mi) east of Shiel Hill. Though winding and often narrow, Highcliff Road is a popular route with tourists, as its location allows for views across the peninsula and harbour.

Prominent features of Highcliff Road which lie near Shiel Hill include the Otago Peninsula Fallen Soldiers' Memorial, a war memorial atop a 225-metre (738 ft) peak known as Arthur's Seat (after the similarly named prominence in Edinburgh, Scotland). This 10-metre-tall (33 ft) monument was designed by E. H. Walden and R.A. Hosie, and stands on a rocky promontory known as Cadzow Rock. It was unveiled in March 1923. Owing to its location, at the top of the peninsula's westernmost promontory, it is visible from much of central Dunedin. The memorial is a notable lookout point, with view across the peninsula, city, and upper harbour, and is accessible via a short steep track.

== Demographics ==
Shiel Hill covers 1.37 km^{2} (0.53 sq mi) and had an estimated population of 1,840 as of June 2025, with a population density of 1,343 people per km^{2}.

Historical population
Year	Pop.	±% p.a.
2006	1,536	—
2013	1,599	+0.58%
2018	1,701	+1.24%

Shiel Hill had a population of 1,701 at the 2018 New Zealand census, an increase of 102 people (6.4%) since the 2013 census, and an increase of 165 people (10.7%) since the 2006 census. There were 618 households, comprising 840 males and 861 females, giving a sex ratio of 0.98 males per female. The median age was 40.7 years (compared with 37.4 years nationally), with 345 people (20.3%) aged under 15 years, 273 (16.0%) aged 15 to 29, 837 (49.2%) aged 30 to 64, and 249 (14.6%) aged 65 or older.

Ethnicities were 81.1% European/Pākehā, 6.9% Māori, 2.1% Pasifika, 15.0% Asian, and 4.2% other ethnicities. People may identify with more than one ethnicity.

The percentage of people born overseas was 26.3, compared with 27.1% nationally.

Although some people chose not to answer the census's question about religious affiliation, 54.5% had no religion, 35.3% were Christian, 1.1% were Hindu, 0.5% were Muslim, 1.4% were Buddhist and 1.1% had other religions.

Of those at least 15 years old, 492 (36.3%) people had a bachelor's or higher degree, and 144 (10.6%) people had no formal qualifications. The median income was $38,400, compared with $31,800 nationally. 300 people (22.1%) earned over $70,000 compared to 17.2% nationally. The employment status of those at least 15 was that 699 (51.5%) people were employed full-time, 249 (18.4%) were part-time, and 27 (2.0%) were unemployed.
