= Allans Beach =

Beach in Otago Region, New Zealand

Coordinates: 45°52′41″S 170°41′28″E

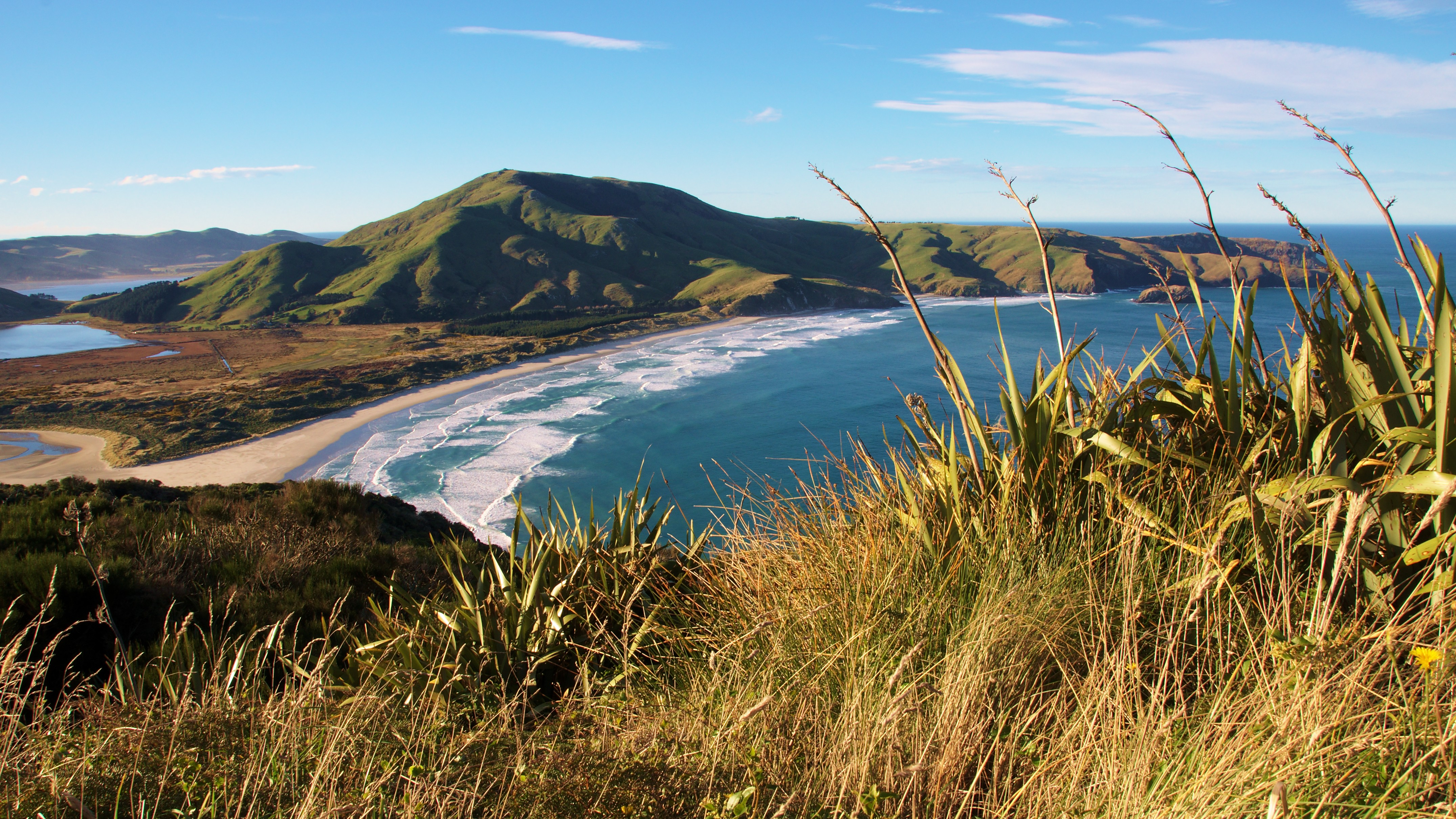
Allans Beach, Mount Charles, and Cape Saunders

Allans Beach is a white sand beach on the Pacific Ocean coast of Otago Peninsula, in the South Island of New Zealand. It forms the seaward shore of a large spit at the entrance to Hoopers Inlet. Allans Beach is 25 kilometres (16 mi) by road from Dunedin city centre and 6 kilometres (3.7 mi) from the small town of Portobello. It receives little human traffic but is known to trampers, surfers, and naturists.

== Physical geography ==
Allans Beach proper is approximately 1.9 kilometres (1.2 mi) long and faces south-southeast; it is part of the Allans Beach Recreation Reserve. It runs to the southwestern tip of the spit which narrows the opening of Hoopers Inlet to a channel some 170 metres (560 ft) across. Behind the beach rises a system of dunes covered in pīkao sedge. Behind these dunes lies Hoopers Inlet Swamp, which consists of a sequence of wetland types from freshwater swamp to salt marsh. The Allans Beach Wildlife Management Reserve covers a section of the Inlet beyond these wetlands.

Northeastward the land rises towards Mount Charles; eastward along the coast the slopes of the Mount abut the sea to form the rugged headlands of Mātakitaki and Cape Saunders. On the far side of the channel the next peak is Sandymount. Periodically, natural processes cause sediments to block the channel entirely, most recently in 2012. The surf at Allans Beach is generally stronger than at beaches closer to the city; in winter the swells coming from the Southern Ocean can be huge.

== Wildlife ==
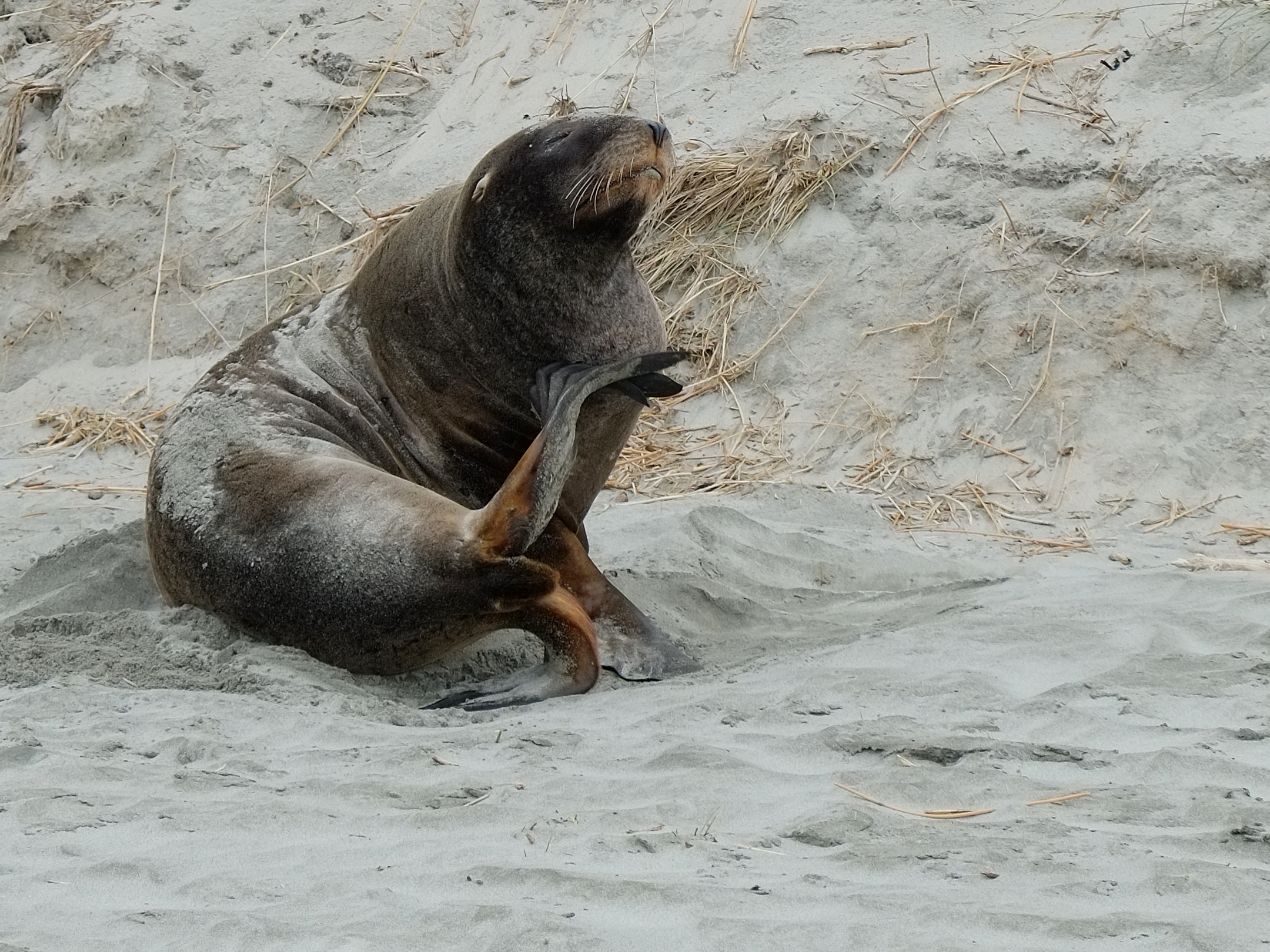
Sea lion on Allans Beach

Allans Beach is frequented by New Zealand fur seals, New Zealand sea lions, and yellow-eyed penguins. The public are urged to keep at least 10 metres (33 ft) away from these animals, and 20 metres (66 ft) from active sea lions. Visitors encountering yellow-eyed penguins are asked to crouch down so as not to disturb them. In addition, Hoopers Inlet and the wetlands on the northern side of the Allans Beach spit host a diverse range of estuarine biota. Sharks may be encountered offshore.

Despite the aforementioned precautions (which may be enforced by fines under the Marine Mammals Protection Act), some recreational users of Allans Beach have been observed harassing the wildlife. The yellow-eyed penguins' nearest nesting colony is on the Sandymount side of the Hoopers Inlet channel; during the periodic natural blockages of the channel it becomes accessible to foot traffic from the beach, thus exposing the colony to interference by humans and dogs.

== Recreational use ==
Allans Beach sees relatively few visitors. Access is via a walking track across farmland from the end of Allans Beach Road. This track continues for the entire length of the beach and is used for walking, jogging, and wildlife observation. The low elevation of the terrain renders it suitable for trampers of all skill levels.

Dogs may be walked on a leash at the western end of the beach but are not permitted at the eastern end, to protect the wildlife. Horses are not permitted on Allans Beach as the area is deemed ecologically sensitive.

The frequently high swells can make Allans Beach dangerous for swimmers and challenging for surfers. At least an intermediate level of surfing skill is recommended except on particularly calm days.

Owing to Allans Beach's secluded situation, it is favoured by naturists. New Zealand has no official nude beaches, as public nudity is legal on any beach where it is "known to occur".
