= Raikiri =

Raikiri may refer to:

- A sword wielded by Sengoku Period samurai:
  - Tachibana Dōsetsu (1513–1585)
  - Tachibana Ginchiyo (1569–1602)
- A ninjutsu technique used by Kakashi Hatake in the manga and anime series Naruto
- A sword technique used in the light novel/anime series Chivalry of a Failed Knight

== See also ==
- Goat Island/Rakiriri, an island in Otago Harbour, South Island, New Zealand
