= Latham Bay =

Bay in New Zealand

Coordinates: 45°50′20″S 170°39′00″E

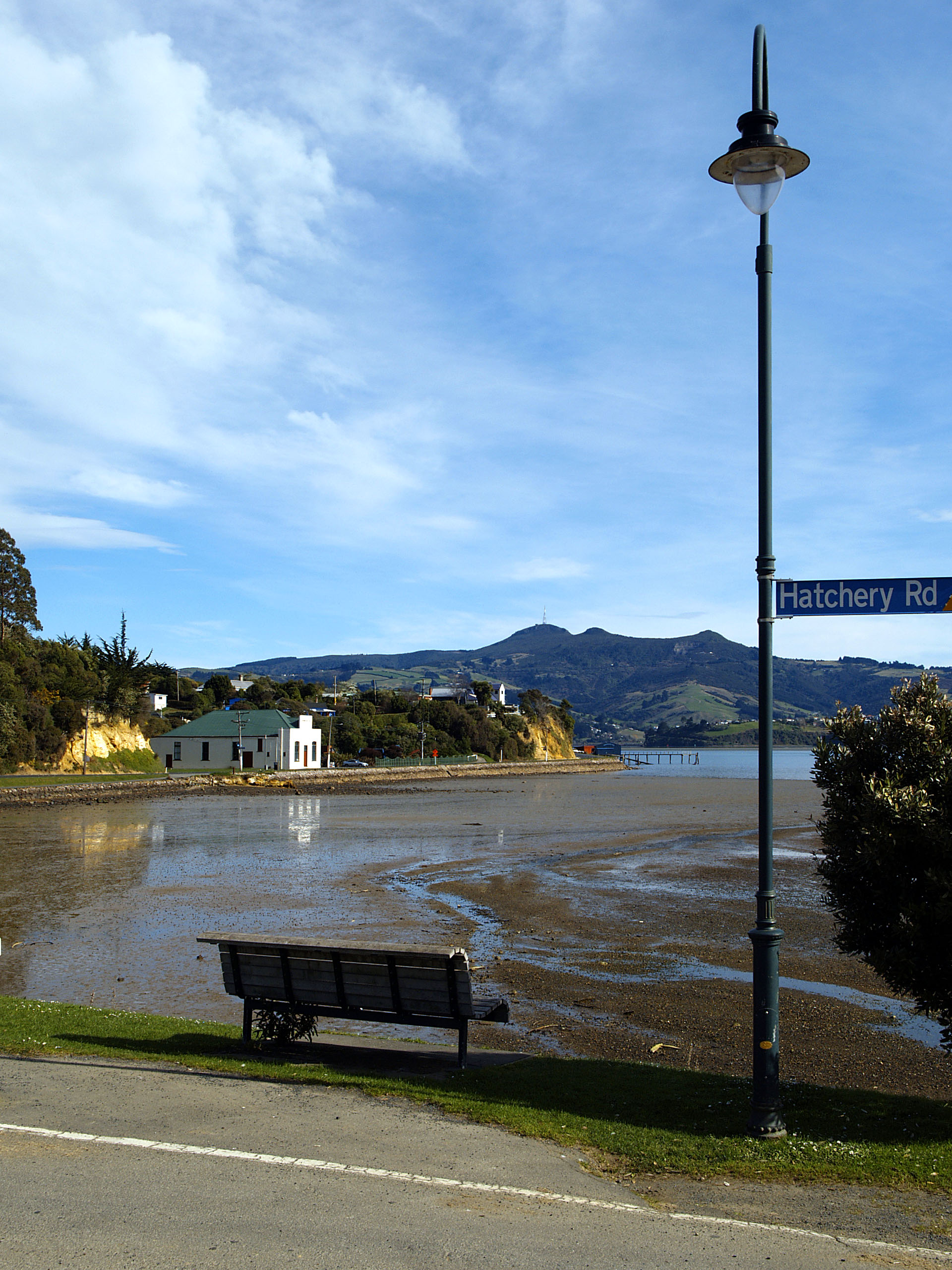
Latham Bay as seen from Portobello

Latham Bay is a bay on the Otago Harbour coast of the Otago Peninsula, New Zealand.

The bay lies within the city limits of the city of Dunedin, some 13 kilometres (8.1 mi) northeast of the city centre. It forms a natural harbour for the settlement of Portobello, which lies on its shore, albeit one which forms extensive mudflats at low tide. The harbour's Quarantine Island sits directly opposite the mouth of Latham Bay, some 1.5 kilometres (0.93 mi) to the northwest. The bay is 250 metres (270 yd) in width and 600 metres (660 yd) in length.

Portobello Road, the main road on Otago Peninsula, winds around the edge of the bay, linking central Dunedin with Portobello and other harbourside communities such as Macandrew Bay and Otakou.

The bay is bounded to the northeast by the Portobello Peninsula, which separates it from the larger Portobello Bay, and to the southwest by the small tidal island Puddingstone Island (also known as Pudding Island and Puddingstone Rock).
