= Vauxhall, New Zealand =

Vauxhall is the name of two places in New Zealand:

- Vauxhall, Auckland, suburb of North Shore City
- Vauxhall, Dunedin, a suburb of Dunedin
