= Waverley, Dunedin =

Suburb of Dunedin, New Zealand

Waverley
- Suburb
- Interactive map of Waverley
- Coordinates: 45°53′06″S 170°32′02″E
- Country: New Zealand
- City: Dunedin
- Local authority: Dunedin City Council

Area
  - Land: 215 ha (530 acres)

Population (June 2025)
  - Total: 2,780
  - Density: 1,290/km^{2} (3,350/sq mi)

	(Otago Harbour)
	Waverley	The Cove
Vauxhall	Andersons Bay	Shiel Hill

Waverley is a suburb of the New Zealand city of Dunedin. It was named after Sir Walter Scott's novel Waverley, first novel in a series known as the Waverley Novels, among the most popular and widely read English-language novels of the 19th century. Waverley is located at the start of the Otago Peninsula, 2.4 kilometres (1.5 mi) southeast of the city centre, on a rise overlooking the Otago Harbour to the north.

== Geography ==
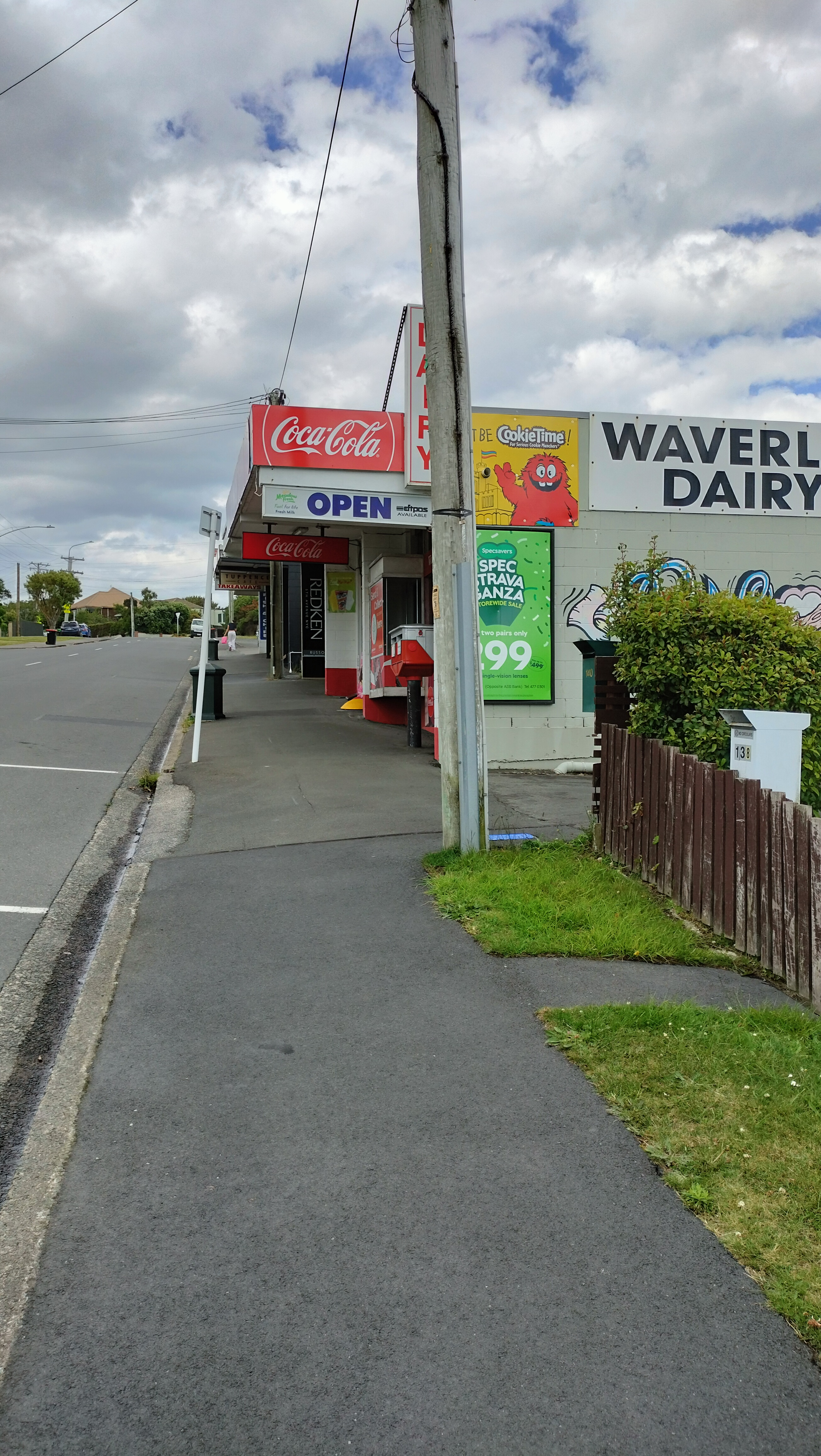
Several Larnarch Road shops including the Waverley Dairy

The suburb is connected to central Dunedin by several streets of which Larnach Road is the most prominent. This descends from the suburb to link with Marne Street on the eastern shore of the Andersons Bay Inlet. Marne Street connects with the suburbs of Andersons Bay and Musselburgh to the south, and in the north links with the causeway which carries Portobello Road from South Dunedin along the northern shore of the Otago Peninsula. Notable other roads linking Waverley and other suburbs include Doon Street, which winds down the steep slopes above the harbour to link Waverley with Vauxhall at Portobello Road, and McKerrow Street, which climbs from northeast Waverley to meet with Highcliff Road at the northern end of Shiel Hill.

The suburb stands on land which was owned by Dunedin early settler The Reverend Thomas Burns, whose dairy farm, Grant Braes, was located here. The farm was named for Burns's wife, whose maiden name was Grant. The original farmhouse still stands, incongruously surrounded by modern housing, and the area of Waverley close to the northern end of Belford Street is still known by the slightly amended name of Grants Braes. Today, the name is best known as that of a local football team, Grants Braes AFC, whose home ground is located 2 km (1.2 mi) to the southeast at Ocean Grove.

== Vauxhall ==
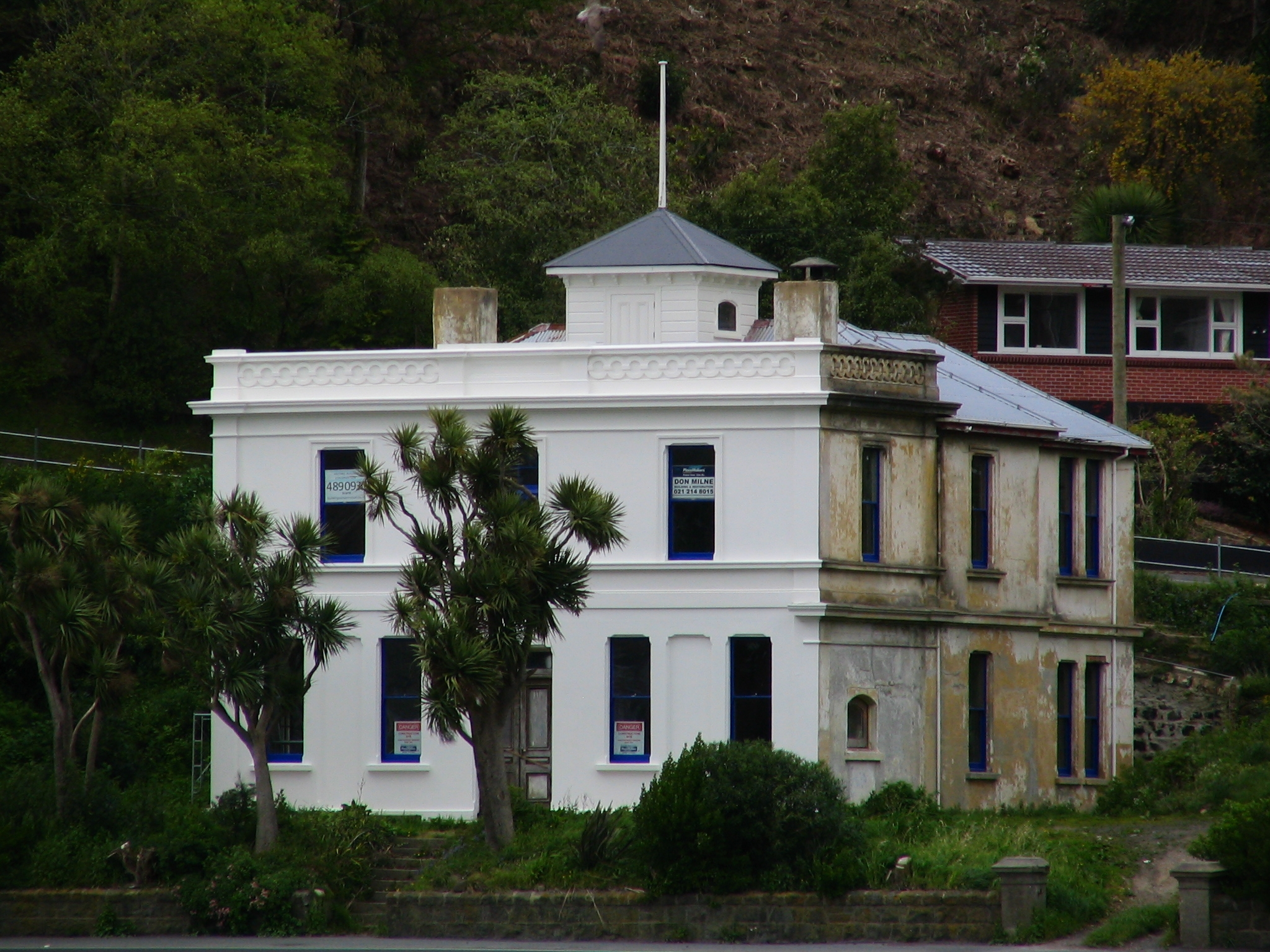
The White House

The smaller suburb of Vauxhall surrounds the suburb on two sides, sitting on the point which juts out over the Andersons Bay Inlet to the southwest of Waverley and on a strip of Portobello Road which follows the Harbour coast to Waverley's northwest. This strip follows a fairly straight course as far as Vauxhall Yacht Club, then curves around a small bay before reaching Burns Point at the northernmost point of Vauxhall. Waverley continues to follow the higher slopes past Burns Point, but the coast road itself is sparsely populated from here as far as The Cove, 1.6 km (0.99 mi) to the east. Burns Point is named for Arthur Burns, son of Thomas Burns. Arthur lived in a house on the site of the current White House.

In the early years of Dunedin, the cliffhead overlooking Andersons Bay Inlet was the site of a colourful and notorious recreation area, the Vauxhall Gardens. Opened at the height of the Otago gold rush in 1862 and named for the gardens at Vauxhall in London, the gardens were the brainchild of wealthy local Henry Farley, who spent a then-astonishing £10,000 on their construction. The 23-acre (9.3 ha) site included a gymnasium, bandstands, dancing areas, a salt-water pool and a funicular railway. A menagerie contained koalas, kangaroos, vultures and Tasmanian devils. The gardens were highly popular, but also became known for the rowdiness and drunkenness of the parties, and for prostitution. The gardens did not survive the end of the gold rush, and were closed in 1870. No trace remains of them today. The land was subdivided and today Vauxhall is a quiet residential suburb.

Two notable buildings stand in the harbourside stretch of Vauxhall. The Vauxhall Yacht Club is housed in a modern building at the southern end of the small bay which lies immediately to the south of Burns Point. Beyond it, in the centre of the bay's coast at the foot of Doon Street, is The White House, originally known as Dandie Dinmont. This building was owned by William Larnach and occupied by him during the construction of Larnach Castle. Larnach's intention was to turn the house into a hotel, the Dandie Dinmont Hotel, but these plans never eventuated. The building has been in a state of neglect for many years, but in 2009 a major restoration was begun, which as of 2016 was still to be completed. The house is a registered Category II historic building.

== Demographics ==
The Waverley statistical area, which includes Vauxhall, The Cove and Challis, covers 2.15 km^{2} (0.83 sq mi) and had an estimated population of 2,780 as of June 2025, with a population density of 1,293 people per km^{2}.

Historical population
Year	Pop.	±% p.a.
2006	2,646	—
2013	2,574	−0.39%
2018	2,646	+0.55%

Waverley had a population of 2,646 at the 2018 New Zealand census, an increase of 72 people (2.8%) since the 2013 census, and unchanged since the 2006 census. There were 1,029 households, comprising 1,281 males and 1,365 females, giving a sex ratio of 0.94 males per female. The median age was 46.5 years (compared with 37.4 years nationally), with 423 people (16.0%) aged under 15 years, 432 (16.3%) aged 15 to 29, 1,299 (49.1%) aged 30 to 64, and 495 (18.7%) aged 65 or older.

Ethnicities were 87.6% European/Pākehā, 6.6% Māori, 1.9% Pasifika, 8.2% Asian, and 3.4% other ethnicities. People may identify with more than one ethnicity.

The percentage of people born overseas was 22.8, compared with 27.1% nationally.

Although some people chose not to answer the census's question about religious affiliation, 50.7% had no religion, 39.5% were Christian, 0.8% were Hindu, 1.0% were Muslim, 0.9% were Buddhist and 1.7% had other religions.

Of those at least 15 years old, 828 (37.2%) people had a bachelor's or higher degree, and 267 (12.0%) people had no formal qualifications. The median income was $40,300, compared with $31,800 nationally. 564 people (25.4%) earned over $70,000 compared to 17.2% nationally. The employment status of those at least 15 was that 1,125 (50.6%) people were employed full-time, 375 (16.9%) were part-time, and 54 (2.4%) were unemployed.

== Education ==
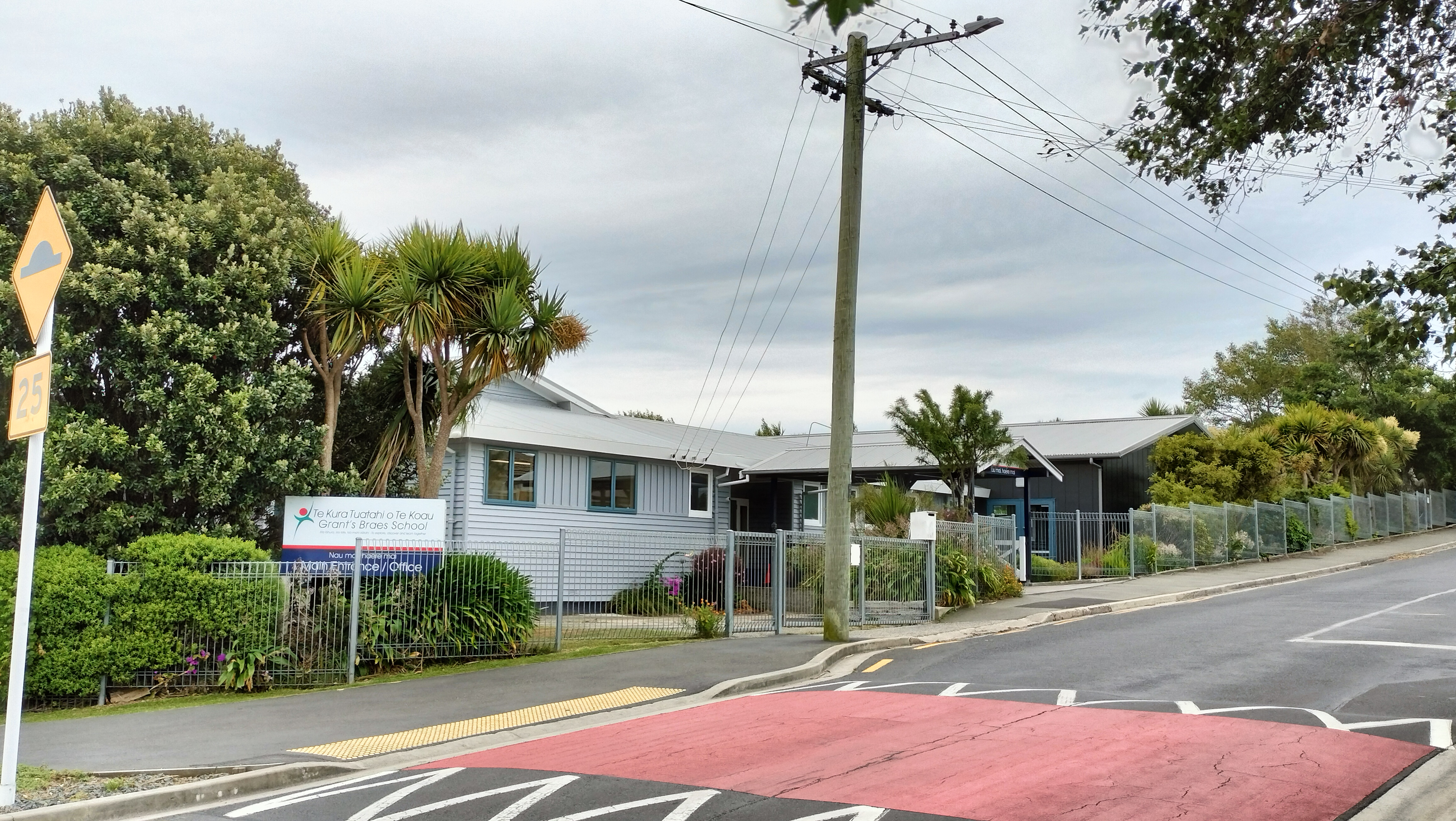
Grants Brae School entrance on Belford Street.

Grant's Braes School is a state co-educational primary school for year 1 to 6 children, with seven classrooms. It has a roll of 203 pupils as of July 2026. The school was opened in 1950.

Rotary Park School, a former decile 10 school in the area, was closed in 2012 after declining enrolments.
