= Goat Island / Rakiriri =

Island in Otago Harbour, New Zealand

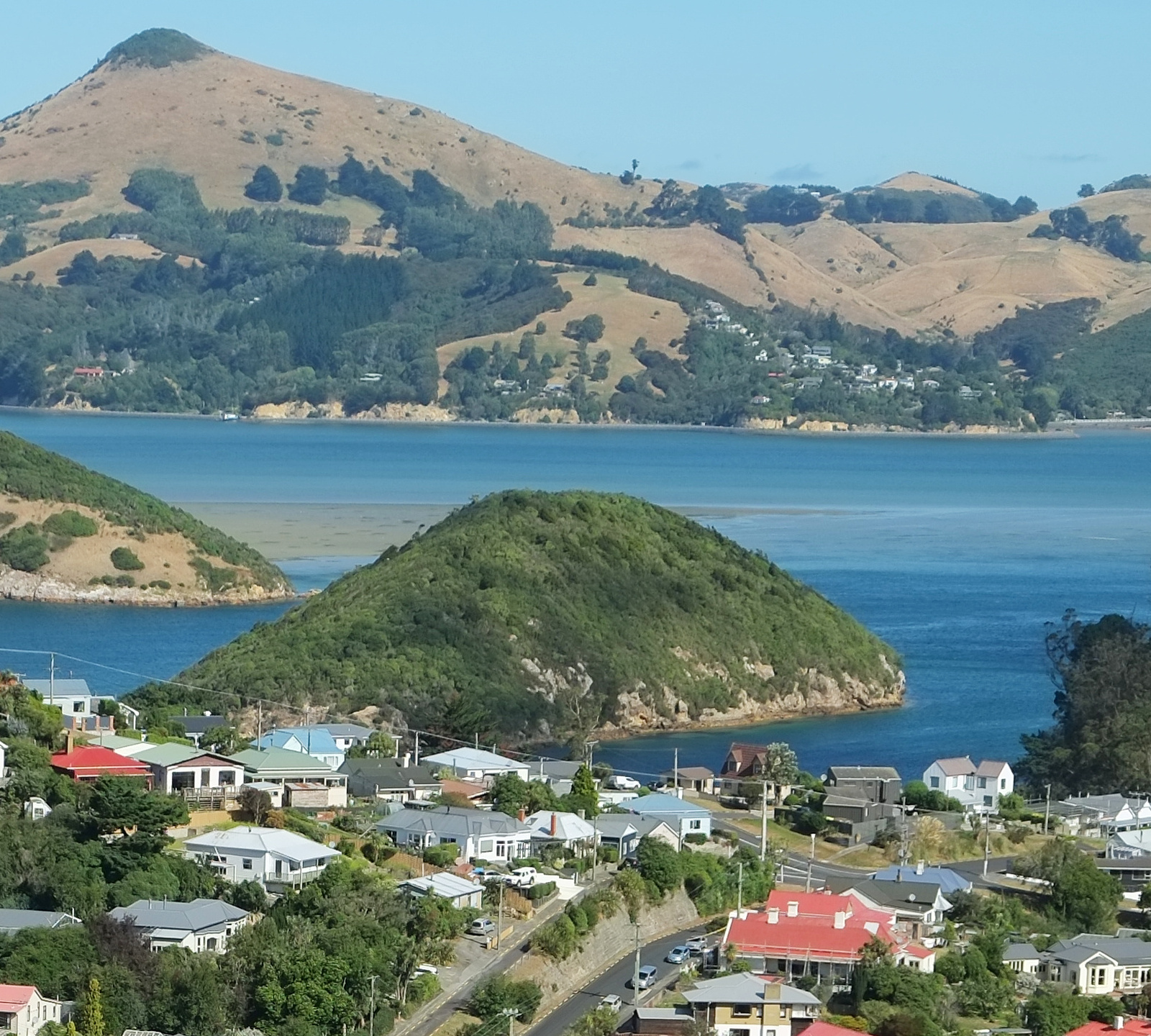
- Goat Island/Rakiriri with Port Chalmers in the foreground and Otago Peninsula in the background
- Interactive map of Goat Island / Rakiriri

Geography
- Location: Otago region
- Coordinates: 45.824463°S 170.625594°E
- Area: 4.5 ha (11 acres)

Administration
- New Zealand

Demographics
- Population: 0

Goat Island / Rakiriri is the second largest island in Otago Harbour, in the South Island of New Zealand. It is located between Port Chalmers and Portobello, to the northeast of Dunedin's city centre.

== Name ==
Since 1998, the island has been gazetted with the dual name Goat Island / Rakiriri, incorporating both the Māori name and the English name. Rakiriri means "angry sky" or "angry Rakinui" in the southern dialect of Māori. The name is also sometimes used to refer to the extinct Dunedin Volcano, of which Otago Harbour is the crater.

== History ==
Goat Island / Rakiriri covers 4.5 hectares (11 acres), and is located to the northwest of the larger Quarantine Island / Kamau Taurua. When the quarantine station was running, single men were quartered in a two storied barrack similar to those on Quarantine Island / Kamau Taurua. Unlike its neighbour, Goat Island / Rakiriri today is uninhabited, and is designated as a scenic reserve and Historic Area. It has been identified by BirdLife International as an Important Bird Area because it has a breeding colony of bronze shags.

== Geography ==
The two islands, along with the Portobello Peninsula, are all part of a ridge (anticline) lying across the centre of the harbour, which was the crater of the long-extinct Dunedin volcano - running from Portobello to Port Chalmers.

== See also ==
- New Zealand outlying islands
- List of islands of New Zealand
- List of islands
- Desert island
