= Challis, New Zealand =

Challis
- Suburb
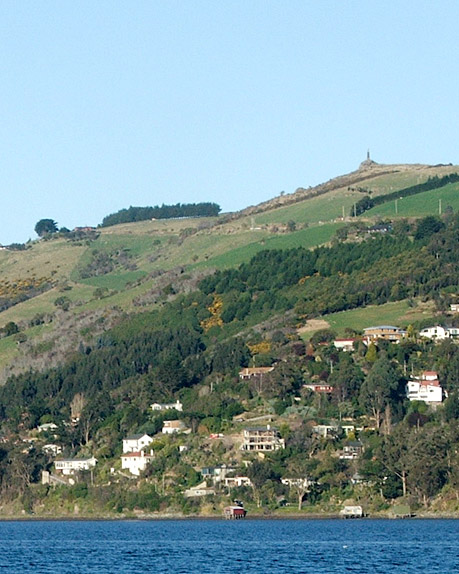
- Challis sits at the harbour's edge below the Otago Peninsula Fallen Soldiers' Memorial, a major local landmark.
- Interactive map of Challis
- Coordinates: 45°52′47″S 170°33′40″E
- Country: New Zealand
- City: Dunedin
- Local authority: Dunedin City Council
- Community board: Otago Peninsula Community Board

Area
  - Land: 72 ha (180 acres)

Population (2018 Census)
  - Total: 177
  - Density: 250/km^{2} (640/sq mi)

	(Otago Harbour)	Macandrew Bay
The Cove	Challis
Ocean Grove		Highcliff

Challis is a settlement on the Otago Harbour coast of Otago Peninsula, within the city limits of the New Zealand city of Dunedin. Though officially regarded as a suburb, the isolated nature of Challis means that most locals regard it as a separate settlement within the city limits (as is also the case with many similar settlements on the Otago Peninsula).

Challis is located close to the shore at the foot of steeply sloping hills and cliffsides 4 kilometres (2.5 mi) to the east of Dunedin city centre on the winding Portobello Road, which runs along the northern shore of the peninsula. Challis is connected by this road to the suburb of Vauxhall 1.8 kilometres (1.1 mi) to the west, and with Macandrew Bay, 2.6 kilometres (1.6 mi) to the northeast.

The larger settlement of The Cove lies immediately to the west, between Challis and Vauxhall.

== Demographics ==
Challis and The Cove cover 0.72 km^{2} (0.28 sq mi), and are part of the larger Waverley statistical area.

Historical population
Year	Pop.	±% p.a.
2006	183	—
2013	177	−0.48%
2018	177	+0.00%

Challis and The Cove had a population of 177 at the 2018 New Zealand census, unchanged since the 2013 census, and a decrease of 6 people (−3.3%) since the 2006 census. There were 69 households, comprising 87 males and 90 females, giving a sex ratio of 0.97 males per female. The median age was 53.5 years (compared with 37.4 years nationally), with 24 people (13.6%) aged under 15 years, 27 (15.3%) aged 15 to 29, 96 (54.2%) aged 30 to 64, and 33 (18.6%) aged 65 or older.

Ethnicities were 94.9% European/Pākehā, 6.8% Māori, 1.7% Asian, and 1.7% other ethnicities. People may identify with more than one ethnicity.

Although some people chose not to answer the census's question about religious affiliation, 59.3% had no religion, 30.5% were Christian and 3.4% had other religions.

Of those at least 15 years old, 84 (54.9%) people had a bachelor's or higher degree, and 18 (11.8%) people had no formal qualifications. The median income was $54,500, compared with $31,800 nationally. 63 people (41.2%) earned over $70,000 compared to 17.2% nationally. The employment status of those at least 15 was that 84 (54.9%) people were employed full-time, 24 (15.7%) were part-time, and 3 (2.0%) were unemployed.
