= Quarantine Island (New Zealand) =

Island in the Otago Harbour, New Zealand

Quarantine Island / Kamau Taurua
Kamau Taurua (Māori)
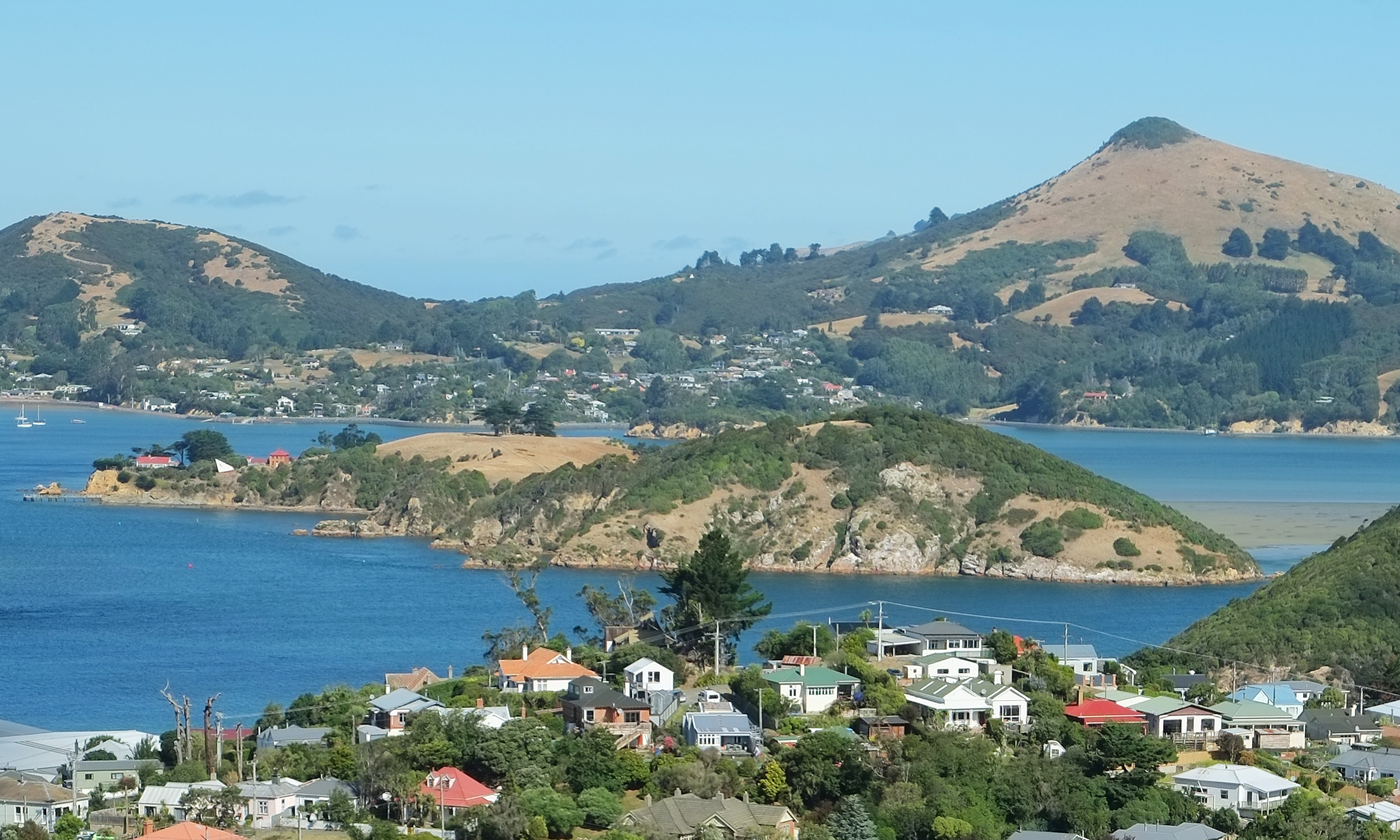
- Quarantine Island with Port Chalmers in the foreground and Otago Peninsula in the background
- Interactive map of Quarantine Island / Kamau Taurua

Geography
- Location: Otago Harbour
- Coordinates: 45.828216°S 170.633104°E
- Area: 15 ha (37 acres)

Administration
- New Zealand

Demographics
- Population: 4 (2019)

Additional information
- Jointly managed by the Quarantine Island / Kamau Taurua Community Incorporated and Department of Conservation

Quarantine Island (also known as Kamau Taurua and officially gazetted as Quarantine Island / Kamau Taurua), is the largest island in Otago Harbour, close to the city of Dunedin, New Zealand. The island covers an area of 15 hectares (37 acres), and is a publicly accessible recreation reserve. The buildings on the island are owned by Quarantine Island / Kamau Taurua Community Incorporated (QIKTC). Its management is shared between QIKTC and the Department of Conservation.

A smaller island, Rakiriri, lies close to Quarantine Island. Both islands lie across the harbour between the town of Port Chalmers and the marine laboratory on Portobello Peninsula, part of the Otago Peninsula.

== Names ==
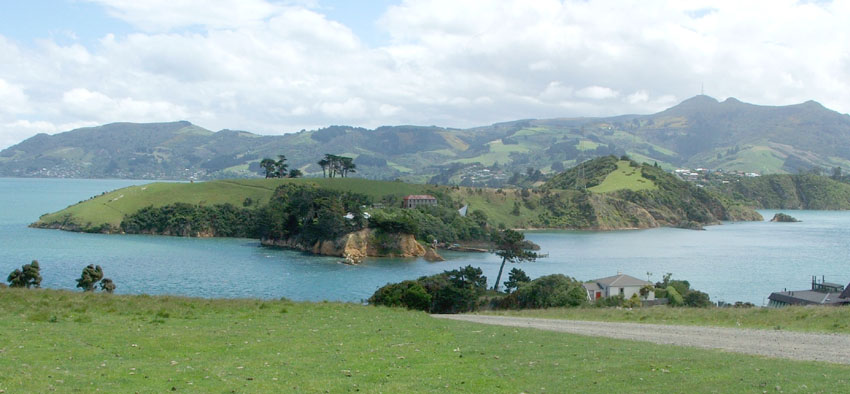
Quarantine Island from above the Portobello Marine Laboratory on Otago Peninsula. The remaining two storied Married Quarters building of the quarantine station is in the centre.

The island has been known by a number of names, including St Martin Island. In 1996 as part of the Ngāi Tahu Treaty of Waitangi settlement the name of Kamau Taurua, meaning 'a place to set nets' was restored as part of the official name of Quarantine Island / Kamau Taurua.

== History ==
The island served as the quarantine station for Otago from 1863 until 1924. It was one of four in New Zealand. When ships arrived in Otago harbour with infectious diseases, passengers were quarantined for that disease, usually one to two weeks, but sometimes longer. The few passengers that were actually sick were treated in the hospital on top of the island. In total 41 ships were quarantined at the island. Of about 9,000 people quarantined about 70 died. There is a small cemetery on the island where they and some of the keeper's family are buried.

During the First World War, soldiers who had venereal diseases (either diagnosed when they volunteered or acquired abroad) were treated on the island, then called the 'Port Chalmers Military Hospital'. However, most New Zealand soldiers with VD were treated overseas.

Only one of the main quarantine buildings from these years has survived, and this is now saved. The island has a Heritage New Zealand Historic Area classification. After the quarantine station closed in 1924 the buildings were sold and island was leased.

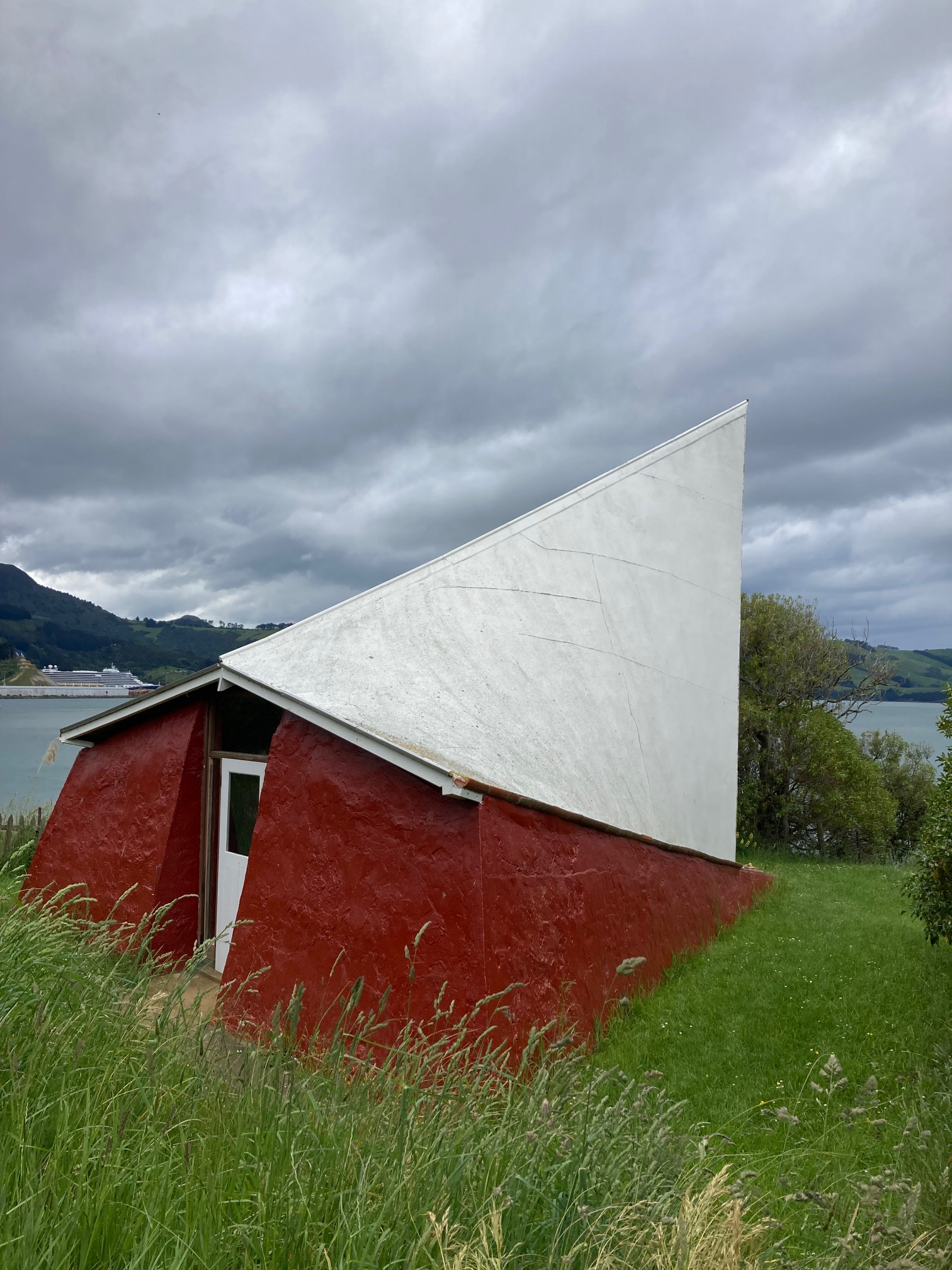
Exterior of the chapel

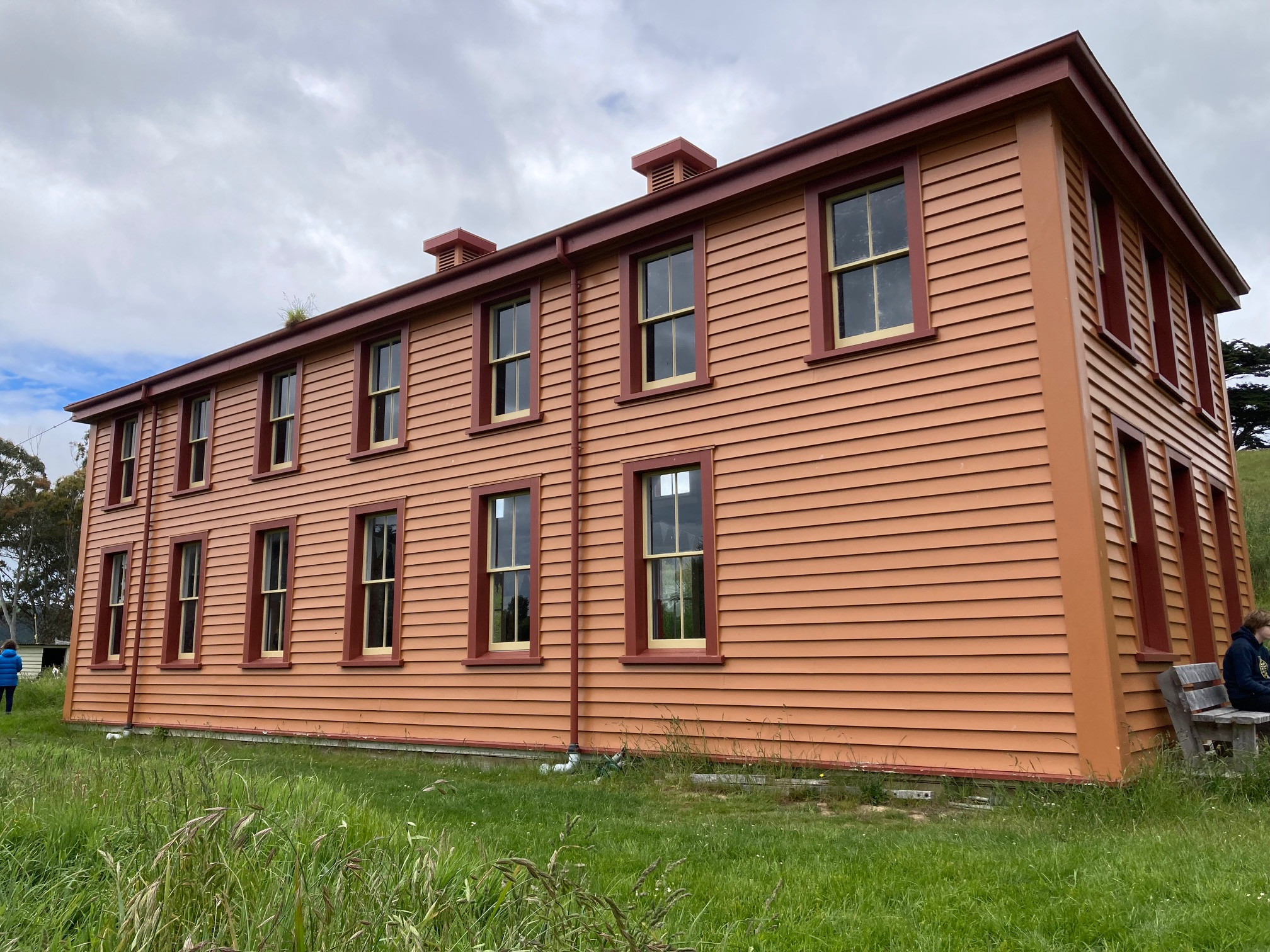
Restored married couples' quarters

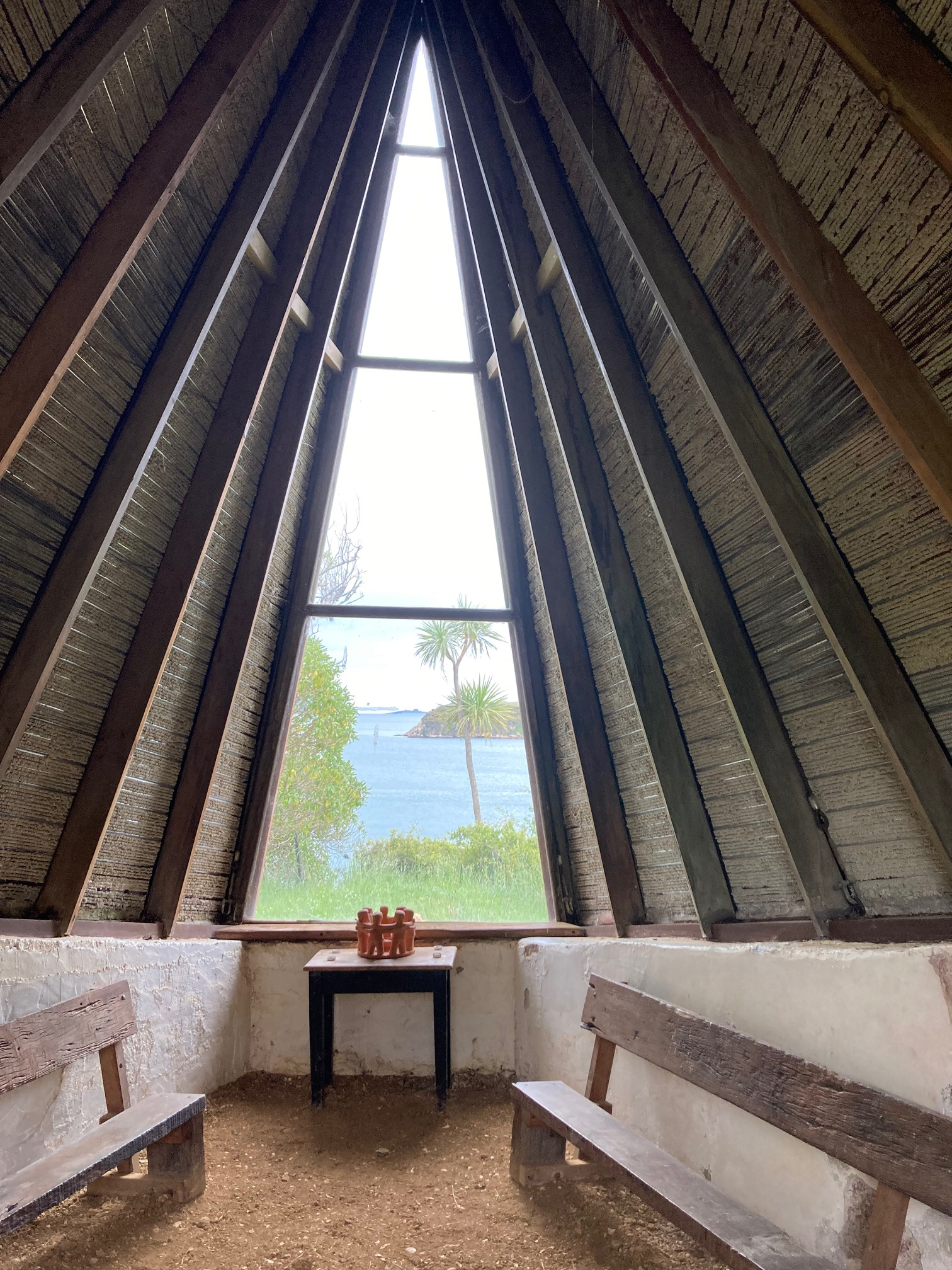
Interior of the chapel, with a view towards Taiaroa Head

== Visitors ==
Now the area around the buildings is leased by QIKTC, established in 1958 as St Martin Island Community, and the remainder jointly managed by the Community and the Department of Conservation. The resident keeper welcomes visitors to St Martin Lodge, and oversees a wide range of ecological, educational, historical and cultural projects.

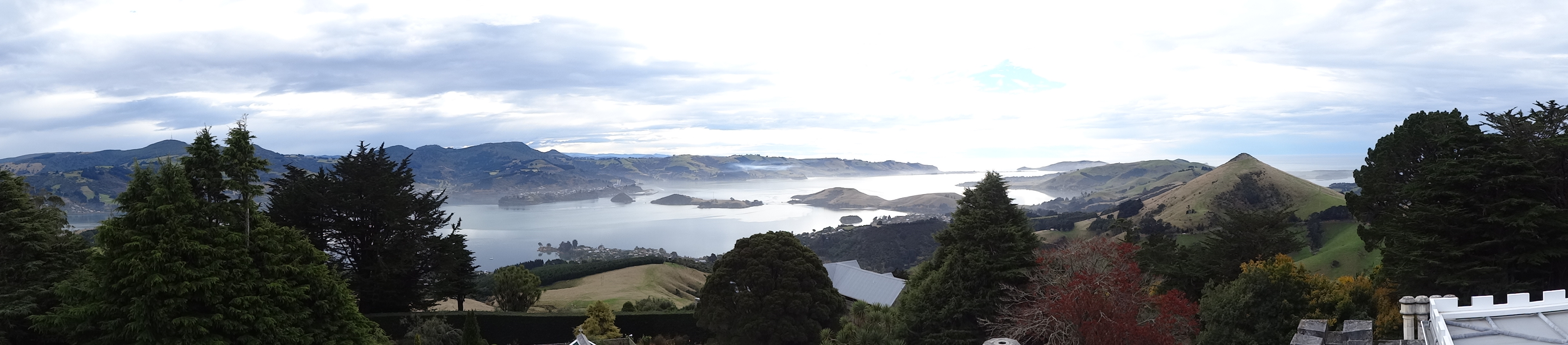
The Dunedin Volcano was originally centred on Quarantine Island (centre of image) and is now highly eroded.

== See also ==
- List of islands of New Zealand
- List of historic places in Dunedin
- Otago Harbour
