= Hoopers Inlet =

Coordinates: 45°52′00″S 170°40′00″E

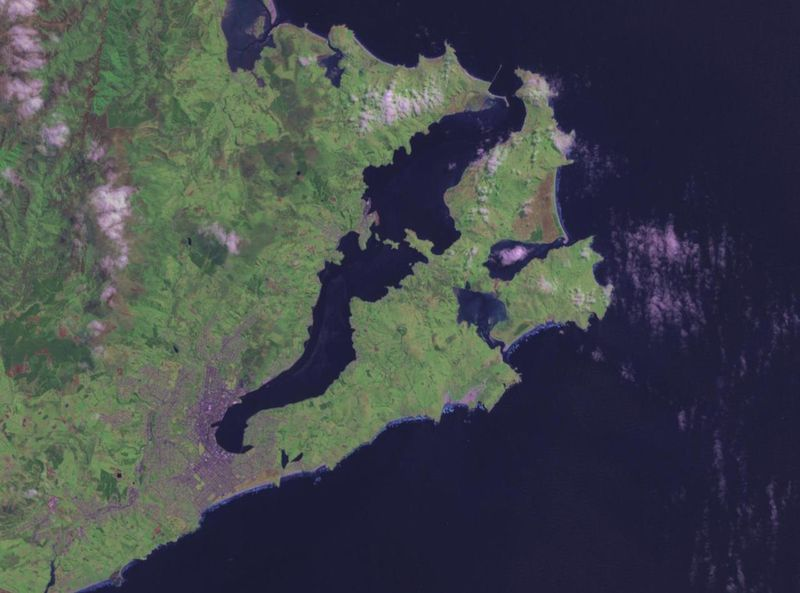
Hoopers Inlet (lower, left) and Papanui Inlet (upper, right) are clearly visible on this NASA satellite photo of Otago Peninsula and Otago Harbour.

Hoopers Inlet is one of two large inlets in the Pacific coast of Otago Peninsula, in the South Island of New Zealand.

The origin of the name is a little confused; there was an early settler family called Hooper who lived nearby, but the name appears on charts made prior to their arrival in the area. A. W. Reed has suggested that the name is a corruption of "Cooper's Inlet", named for Daniel Cooper, the ship's captain of the Unity, which operated in the area during the Peninsula's years as a base for sealers. The inlet was on a traditional Māori route for collecting shellfish, which ran from Otakou to what is now St. Clair. The Māori name for the inlet was Puke-tu-roto, meaning either "hills standing around a lake" or "hills standing inland".

Like its near neighbour, Papanui Inlet, Hoopers Inlet is known for its diverse bird life. The inlet lies 2 km to the south of Portobello and can be reached by road from both there and the city of Dunedin (of which it is administratively a part), the centre of which lies 15 kilometres to the west. Both inlets are shallow, becoming predominantly sand and mud flats at low tide.

The mouth of Hoopers Inlet is narrowed by a large spit, the seaward coast of which forms Allans Beach. Behind this beach is a significant area of wetland and swamp, which is home to many species of flora and birds.

Hoopers Inlet is separated from Papanui Inlet by a strip of land which is the isthmus to a hilly peninsula containing Cape Saunders and the peninsula's highest point, the 408-metre Mount Charles.
