= Otago Harbour =

Natural harbour of Dunedin, New Zealand

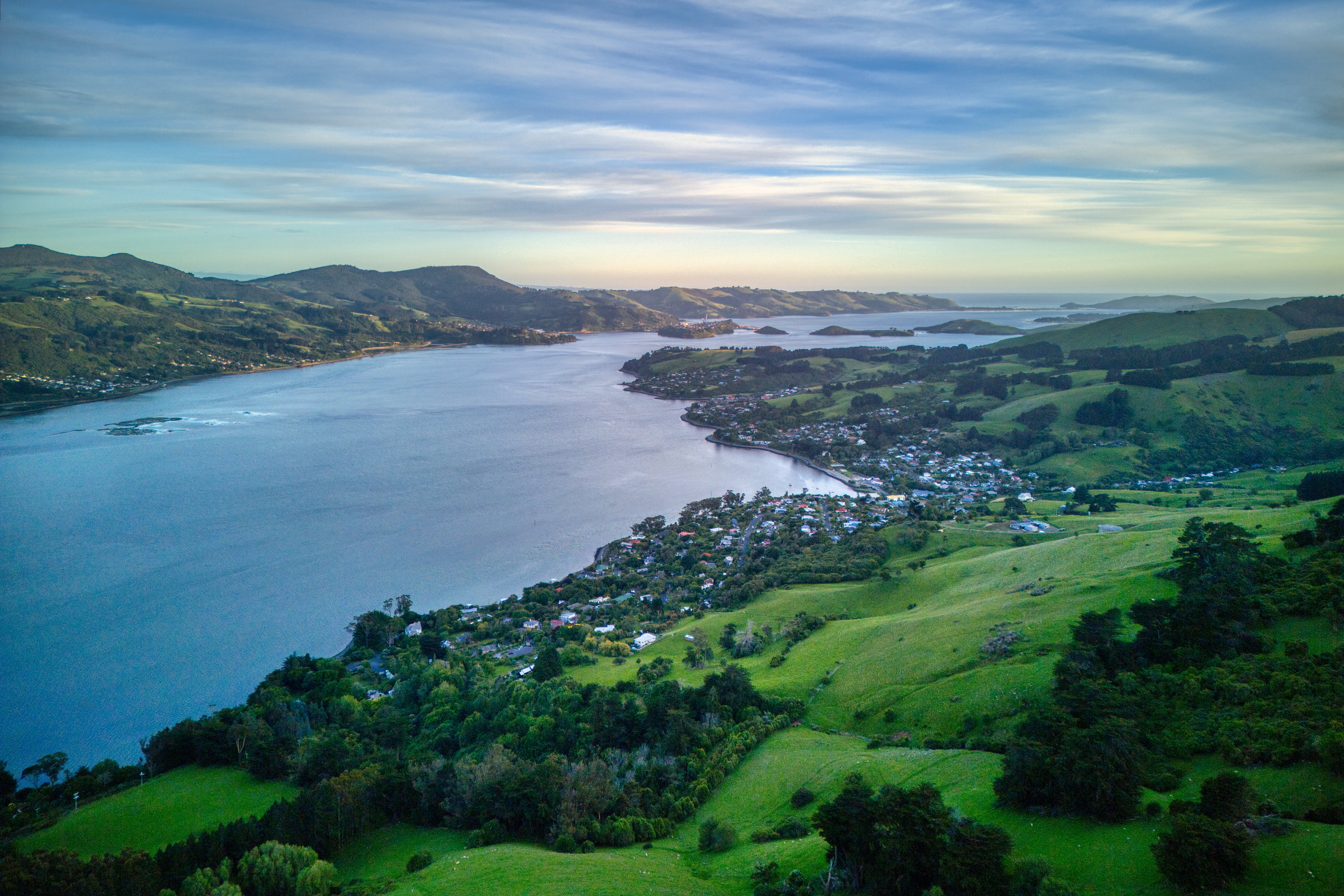
- Otago Harbour

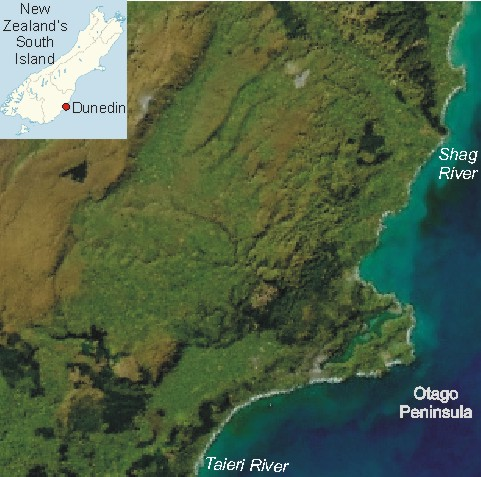

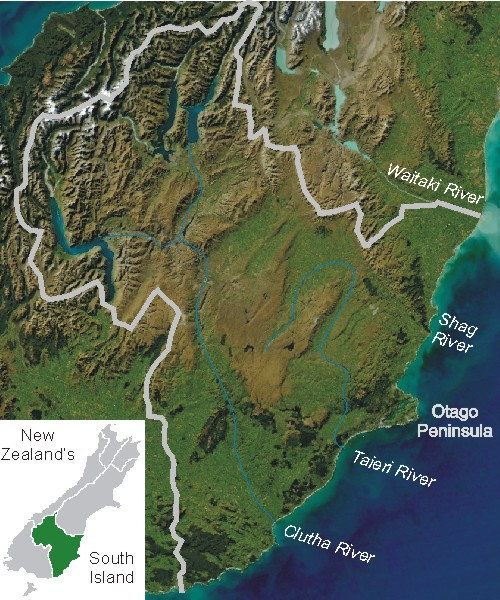
- Location within Otago peninsula
- Location: Dunedin, Otago, New Zealand
- Coordinates: 45.8317°S 170.6294°E
- River sources: Water of Leith and Toitū Stream
- Ocean/sea sources: South Pacific Ocean
- Basin countries: New Zealand
- Max. length: 21 kilometres (13 miles)
- Islands: Quarantine Island, Goat Island / Rakiriri, and Puddingstone Island
- Settlements: Dunedin and Port Chalmers

Otago Harbour is the natural harbour of Dunedin, New Zealand, consisting of a long, much-indented stretch of generally navigable water separating the Otago Peninsula from the mainland. The peninsula joins the mainland at its southwest end, 21 km (13 mi) from the harbour mouth. The harbour is home to Dunedin's two port facilities, Port Chalmers (half way along the harbour) and at Dunedin's wharf (at the harbour's end). The harbour has been of significant economic importance for approximately 700 years, as a sheltered harbour and fishery, then deep water port. Geologically, the harbour was formed from the drowned remnants of the Dunedin Volcano.

== Geography ==
The harbour was formed from the drowned remnants of the giant Dunedin Volcano, centred close to what is now Port Chalmers. Remains of this origin can be seen in the basalt of the surrounding hills. The last eruptive phase ended some ten million years ago, leaving the prominent peak of Mount Cargill. A channel runs along the western side of the harbour, the eastern side being shallow, with large sandbanks exposed at low tide. Two islands form a line between Port Chalmers and Portobello half way along the harbour—Goat Island / Rakiriri and Quarantine Island / Kamau Taurua. The nearby smaller island known as Puddingstone or Pudding Island (Titeremoana) lies close to the Peninsula shore and can be reached by foot at low tide. The Water of Leith flows into the harbour at its southern end, lowering the salinity of the harbour water there, along with numerous streams.

The harbour's edge is dotted with bays, among them Deborah Bay, Careys Bay, Sawyers Bay, and Blanket Bay on the northwestern shore and Macandrew Bay, Company Bay, Turnbulls Bay, Edwards Bay, Broad Bay, Latham Bay, and Portobello Bay on the peninsula shore.

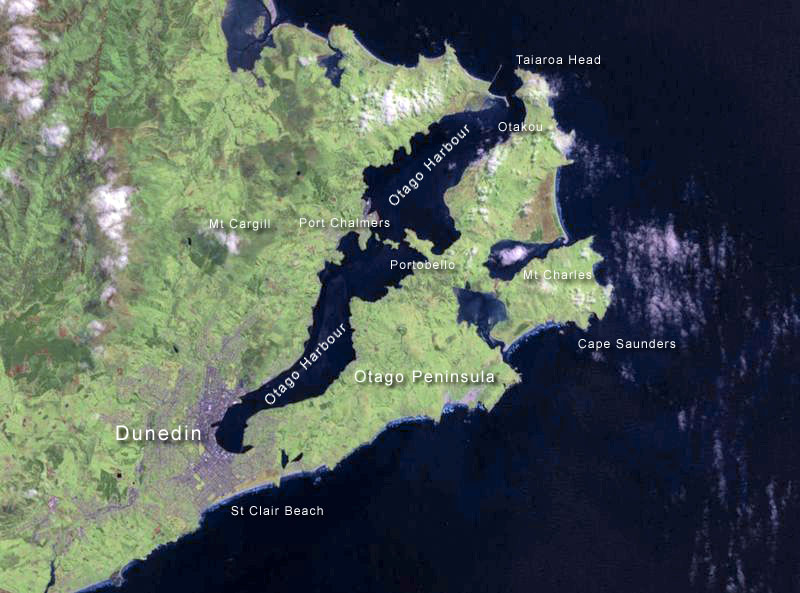
NASA satellite photo of Otago Harbour and Peninsula.

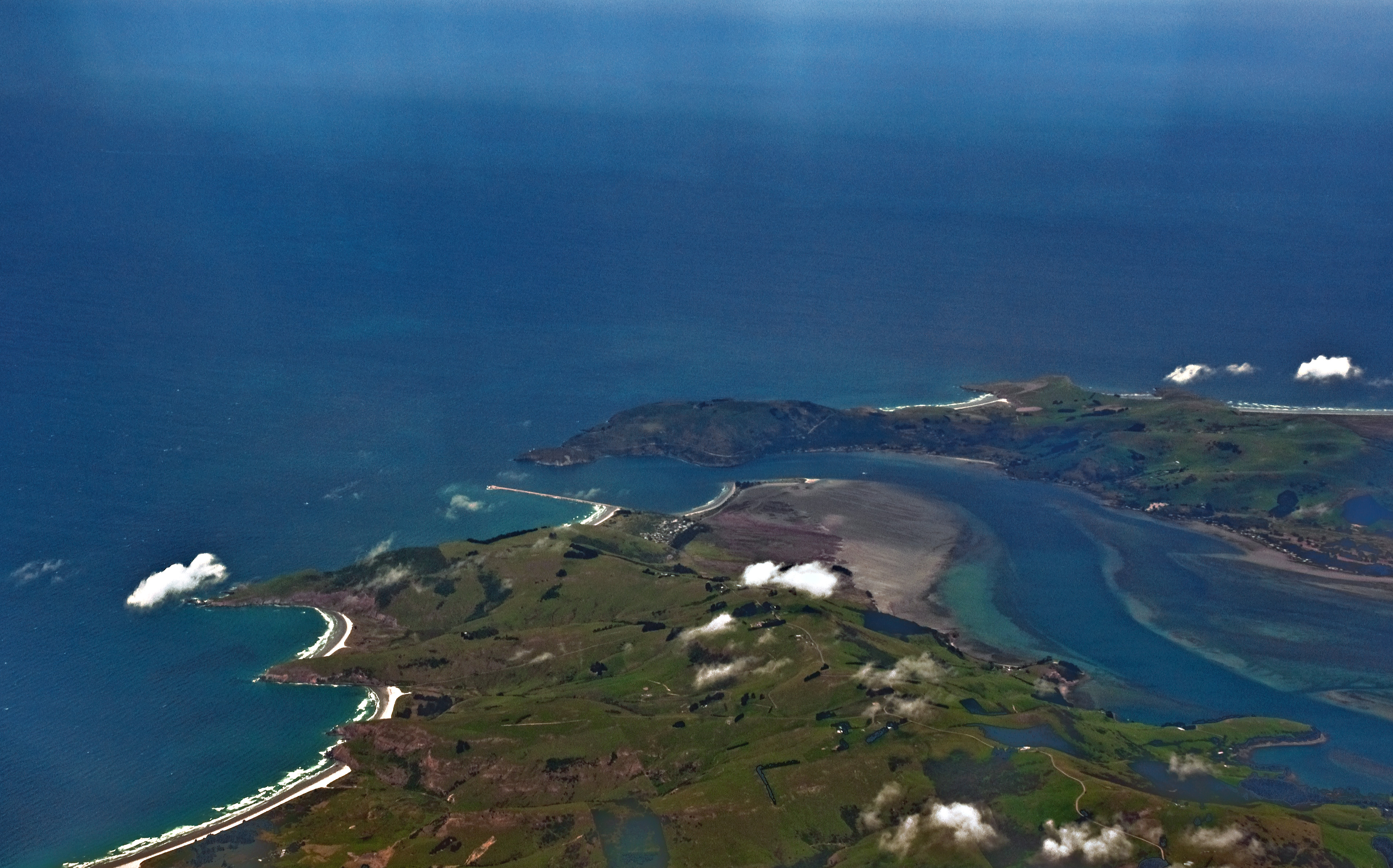
Otago Harbour mouth.

== Biology ==
=== Seabirds ===
Like the Otago Peninsula, the harbour itself is known for its rare wildlife. The area is the home of many species of wading birds, as well as two penguin species: the blue penguin and the rare yellow-eyed penguin. Taiaroa Head, at the tip of the Otago Peninsula, is home to the only "mainland" colony of northern royal albatrosses in the world.

=== Marine mammals ===
The bay and peninsula provides a critical habitat for Hooker's sea lions and New Zealand fur seals. Southern elephant and leopard seals are occasional visitors into the harbour. In total, four species of pinnipeds, and at least nine or more species of cetaceans are known to inhabit or migrate through the area.

The outer peninsula adjacent to Taiaroa Head is one of three main congregating areas for dusky dolphins in New Zealand waters and the harbour and peninsula hosts important areas for breeding and nursing. Bottlenose dolphins and critically endangered, endemic Hector's dolphins also frequent the water. Common dolphins and orcas also visit the harbour entrance, where orcas and dusky dolphins have been seen interacting without violence. Southern right whales were historically seen inside the entrance of the harbour, possibly up to Quarantine and Goat Island / Rakiriri. They used the shallow, calm water for nursing calves before commercial whaling wiped them out locally. The number of humpback whales visiting the peninsula has increased, as this species recovers much faster than the southern rights. Blue whales, minke whales, and long-finned pilot whales have also been observed.

== History ==
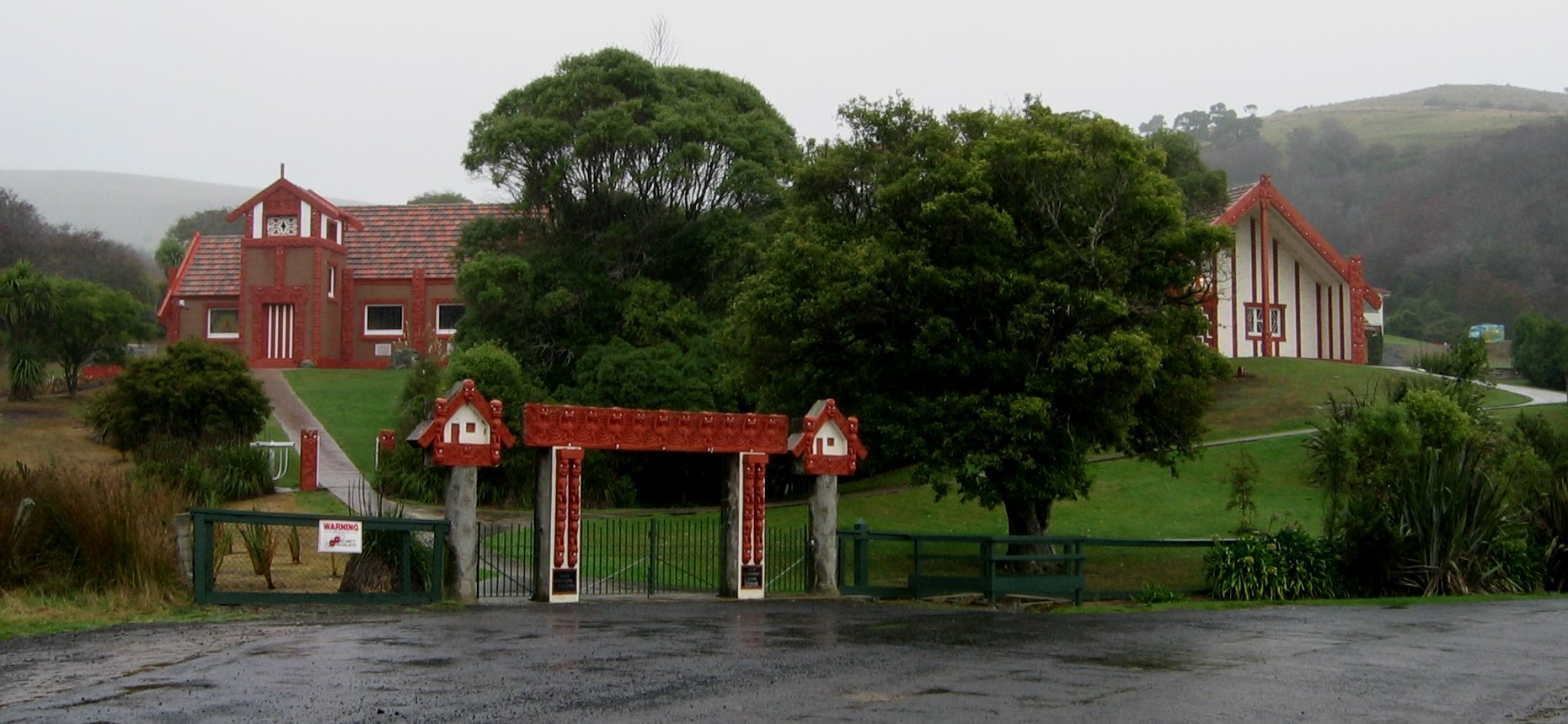
Ōtākou, the centre of fishing and trade on the harbour for centuries.

Māori first arrived at Otago Harbour in the 1300s, soon after they reached New Zealand. Being too far south for the cultivation of kūmara they adopted a hunter-gatherer society. This initially involved sealing and fishing in the harbour, with the latter dominating as seal stocks diminished. This time in the harbour's history is recorded in place names such as Kamau Taurua (Quarantine Island), which means "a place where nets are set".

=== The first European ships ===
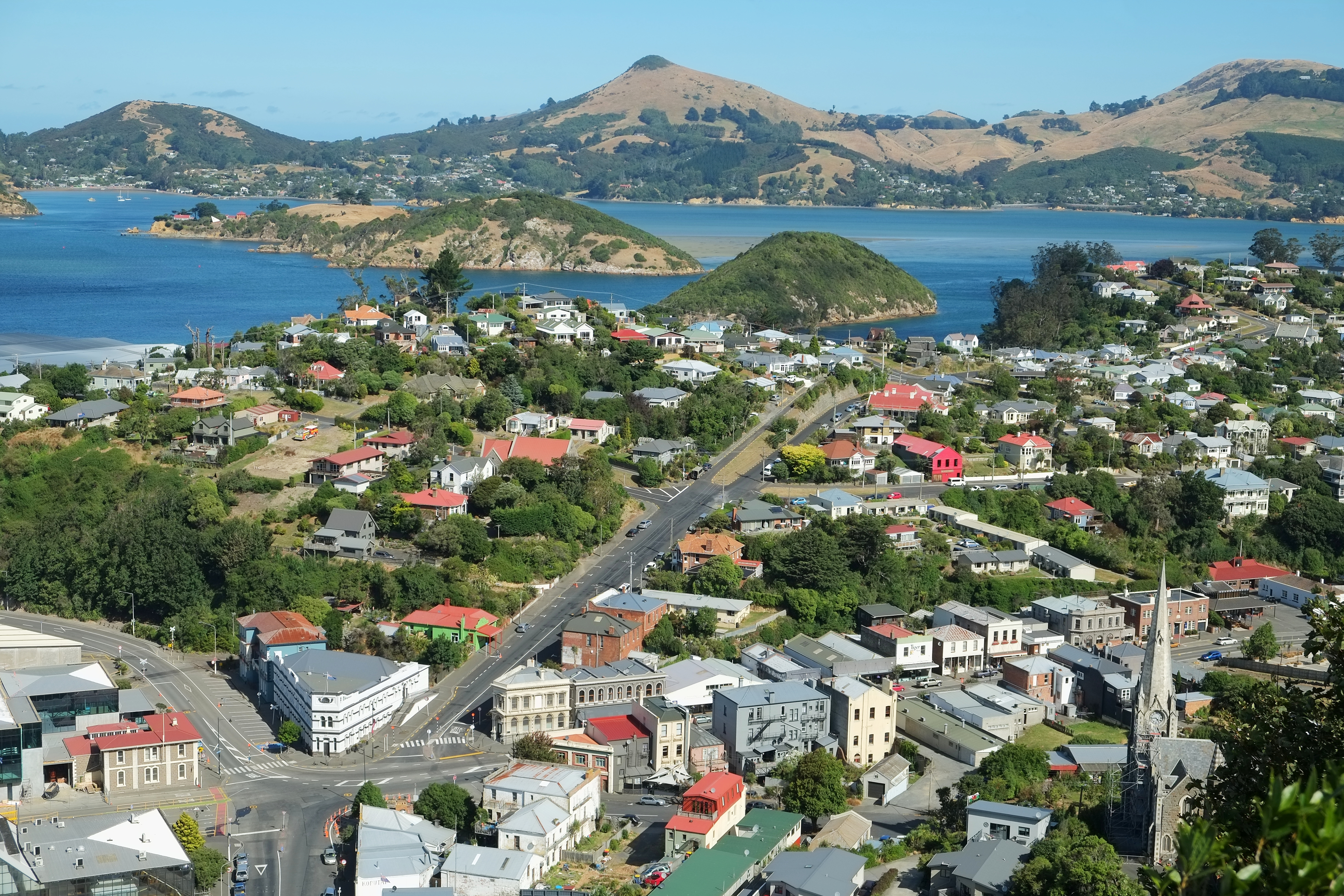
Looking across Port Chalmers and the Otago Harbour to the Otago Peninsula.

Captain Cook never entered Otago Harbour, but he speculated that it existed when he was off the Pacific coast in 1770. It is not known exactly when the first Europeans (likely sealers) entered the harbour, though Māori oral tradition puts it some time 'long before' 1810. Written records of this time are restricted to a handful of journals and newspaper accounts of sailors who only stayed briefly. George Bass made the Dunedin end of the harbour the north east limit of his proposed fishing monopoly in 1803. The American ship Favourite and its supercargo Daniel Whitney may have called in the summer of 1805 to 1806. Daniel Cooper, master of the London sealer Unity, probably did visit in the summer of 1808 to 1809 as it is thought his Chief Officer, Charles Hooper, gave his name to Hooper's Inlet on the Otago Peninsula. The first explicit and identifiable reference to a European ship in Otago Harbour is in 1810. William Tucker (1784–1817) was with a gang employed by Robert Campbell, a Sydney merchant, who were dropped on islands off the Dunedin coast in November 1809. Tucker and Daniel Wilson were at Otago Harbour on 3 May 1810 when Robert Mason, master of the Brothers, anchored in the harbour and picked him up. The court record mentioning this, written in 1810, refers to the harbour as 'Port Daniel', a name which stayed in use for some years.

=== The sealers and whalers ===
Another English sealer, the Sydney Cove, under Captain Charles McLaren, was anchored in the harbour late in 1810 when Te Wahia's theft of a knife, a red shirt, and some other articles sparked what has been called "The Sealers' War".

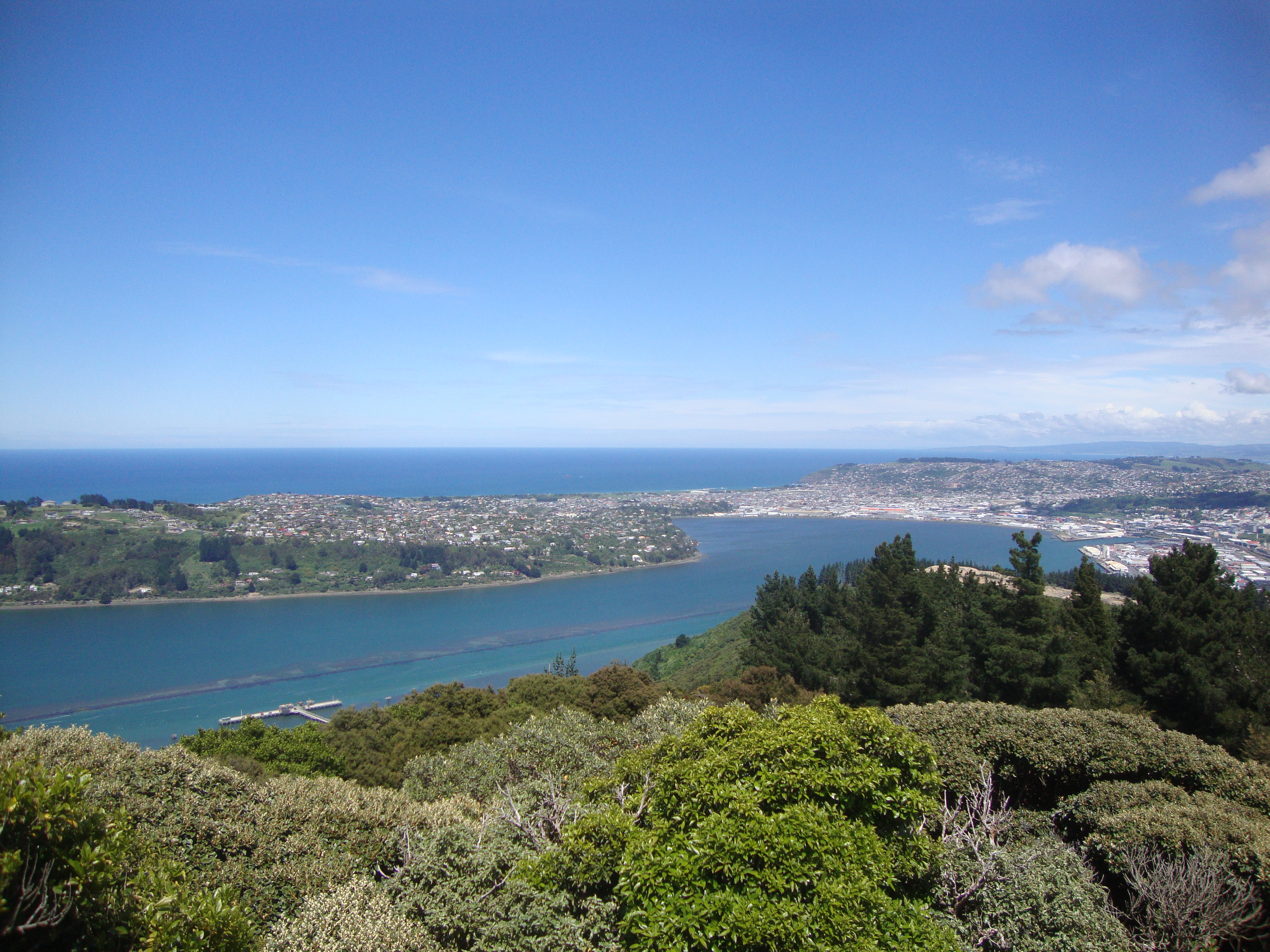
Victoria Channel and the port of Dunedin (1881–today).

James Kelly of Hobart anchored the Sophia in the harbour in December 1817 with William Tucker on board. They visited nearby Whareakeake, where Tucker had been living since 1815, and Tucker and two other men were killed by Māori. Kelly and his men proceeded to kill large numbers of Māori, including a local chief named Korako. He then burnt a harbourside village, 'the beautiful City of Otago', probably on Te Rauone Beach.

Peace was achieved in 1823, and on 17 July of that year John Rodolphus Kent of the naval cutter Mermaid from New South Wales, while in the harbour, took 'the liberty of naming it (as it has not hitherto been named) "Port Oxley", in honour of the Surveyor General of the Colony', John Oxley (1783/85?–1828). As noted, however, it had already been named by both Māori and English colonisers. In 1826 Thomas Shepherd, one of a party of intending colonists, explored the site of Dunedin and left the oldest surviving pictures of the harbour and nearby coast, now in the Mitchell Library in Sydney.

From its origins as a secret sealers' haven, Otago Harbour developed into a busy international whaling port after the Weller brothers established their whaling station at Te Umu Kuri, Wellers Rock, at what is now called Ōtākou in November 1831. The busiest whaling port south of the Bay of Islands, it was also the hub of the largest European population in New Zealand after the Bay of Islands/Hokianga district by the end of 1839. By then whaling had collapsed, and Dumont D'Urville and his officers, visiting in 1840, observed that the port had become the centre of a riotous trade in liquor and prostitution. This continued until the Scottish settlers arrived in 1848 and made Port Chalmers and Dunedin the new population centres on the harbour.

=== Harbour developments and alterations ===
Map showing land reclamation since 1848 at the head of the harbour

While Otago Harbour might have the appearance of an excellent deep-water port, it was not naturally suited to such a role, especially in the early days of settlement when ships needed to dock close to the city. The flat land at the southern end of the harbour and close to the isthmus of Otago Peninsula was ideally suited for a city (and was the site for Dunedin), but the harbour itself could naturally accommodate deep-drafted ships only as far as Port Chalmers. At Port Chalmers, two islands (Quarantine Island / Kamau Taurua and Goat Island / Rakiriri) almost bisect the harbour. Beyond them, the harbour is shallow and silty, and mudflats are often visible at low tide. In 1946 Otakou Fisheries was started based out of the township of the same name on the eastern side of the harbour. This was later to become a major part of the Otago fishing industry.

As the city grew, and particularly with the increase in commerce that developed following the Otago gold rush of the 1860s, it became desirable to provide a means for ships to reach the city's wharves. Though a contentious and expensive decision, it was agreed to dredge a channel along the northwestern side of the harbour. The channel was finally opened on 30 December 1881. The initial channel was narrow and shallow, and did not get off to an auspicious start, as the Union Steam Ship Company's SS Penguin, the first ship to use it, was temporarily grounded while using it. The channel was officially named the Victoria Channel by Keith Ramsay, chairman of the Otago Harbour Board. A significant area at the head of the harbour — much of it referred to as the Southern Endowment — has been reclaimed since the founding of Dunedin, primarily for industrial use. Smaller portions have also been reclaimed at a number of places around the harbour, including Port Chalmers, Macandrew Bay, and Broad Bay.

As finance allowed, the channel was gradually widened and deepened, and by 1907 twice as many ships were using Dunedin's wharves as used Port Chalmers. It was only with the advent of Port Chalmers' container port in the early 1970s that the Victoria Channel again became quiet. The channel is maintained by Port Otago Ltd, which keeps it dredged to a depth of eight metres, allowing ships of up to 40,000 tonnes deadweight to travel up the harbour to Dunedin. Much of the channel's larger traffic in the early 21st century is oil transport to Dunedin city and chemicals and fertiliser to and from Ravensbourne's fertiliser works.

Aramoana, at the harbour mouth, has twice been projected as the site for New Zealand's second aluminium smelter. The proposals, in the mid-1970s and early 1980s, were abandoned after major public protest. The harbour is tidal, shallow and seldom rough and for that reason is popular for water sports such as yachting and windsurfing.

== Infrastructure and transport ==
Substantial container port facilities exist at Port Chalmers, 9 km (6 mi) along the western shore from the harbour mouth. A channel along the western side of the harbour is regularly dredged, allowing vessels with a draught of 12.5 m to Port Chalmers, and 8 m all the way to the heart of Dunedin. New Zealand's frozen meat export trade was inaugurated at Port Chalmers in 1882. Portobello is home to one of New Zealand's leading marine research establishments, the Portobello Marine Laboratory, a department of the University of Otago. This lies at the harbour's edge on the tip of a small arm of the Otago Peninsula, the Portobello Peninsula. There are currently numerous sightseeing and fishing boats that can be chartered and one scheduled ferry from Port Chalmers to Portobello.

The harbour is flanked by major roads leading from Dunedin to Port Chalmers (SH 88) and to Portobello and Ōtākou (Portobello Road). A long-distance cycleway and walkway, Te Aka Ōtākou, runs parallel to both roads along the harbour's edge for 36 kilometres (22 mi). It was completed in 2023 and links Port Chalmers and Portobello. The South Island Main Trunk railway also runs parallel to the state highway on the western side of the harbour. Both of these routes cross causeways to navigate several of the harbour's bays, notably at Blanket Bay, between St Leonards and Port Chalmers.

== Notable ships ==
Image	Name	Year(s) in harbour	Type	Length (m)	Displacement(tonnes)	Crew/Passengers	Purpose	Note
	Atrato	1874	Paddle steamer	102	3,184			Old Royal Mail ship
	Dunedin	1882	Sail	73	1,320	/400 (design max)	Cargo	Refrigerated transport
	Endeavour	1770	Sail (Barque)	30	366	94/	Exploration	Did not enter harbour
	John Wickliffe	1847	sail		662	/97	Colonisation	Scottish settler ship
	Mokoia		Steam		3502			Wrecked at harbour mouth
	Monarch	1952 (Launched)		16.5			Harbour ferry	
	Oreti		Steam					Wrecked at Quarantine Island
	Philip Laing	1848				/247	Colonisation	Scottish settler ship
	Pride of the Yarra	1863	Steam				Harbour ferry	Wrecked at Blanket Bay
	Rainbow Warrior	2018	(A-frame staysail schooner)		838	30		
	Sootychaser	2018	Custom built				Harbour ferry	Scheduled ferry and water taxi
	Star of India	1871-1897			1247		Colonisation	100-day voyage from England
	Sydney Cove	1810		28.7	283	24 (typical crew)	Sealer	Sparked the Sealers' War
	Waikana		Steam			/800 (design max)	Harbour ferry	Wrecked at Quarantine Island

== Harbourside settlements ==
Otago Harbour

The settlements of Otago Harbour clock wise from the harbour mouth.

Photo	Name	Harbour side	Population	Feature
	Harington Point	East		
	Weller's Rock	East		With access to the albatross colony, seal colony, and Fort Taiaroa
	Ōtākou	East		Home of the Ōtākou Rūnanga of Ngāi Tahu and starting place of Otakou Fisheries.
	Harwood	East		
	Portobello	East	1110	On the shore of Latham Bay
	Broad Bay	East		
	Macandrew Bay	East	1146	
	Challis	East		
	Andersons Bay	East	2478	
	Dunedin (Central City)	South		
	Ravensbourne	West	1230	fertiliser works
	Saint Leonards	West	780	
	Roseneath	West		
	Sawyers Bay	West	1212	with a tannery
	Port Chalmers	West	1365	
	Careys Bay	West		
	Aramoana	West	270	Māori for "pathway to the sea"

== Gallery ==
- Category:Otago Harbour on Wikimedia Commons
