= Portobello Marine Laboratory =

New Zealand research facility

Coordinates: 45.82792°S 170.64090°E

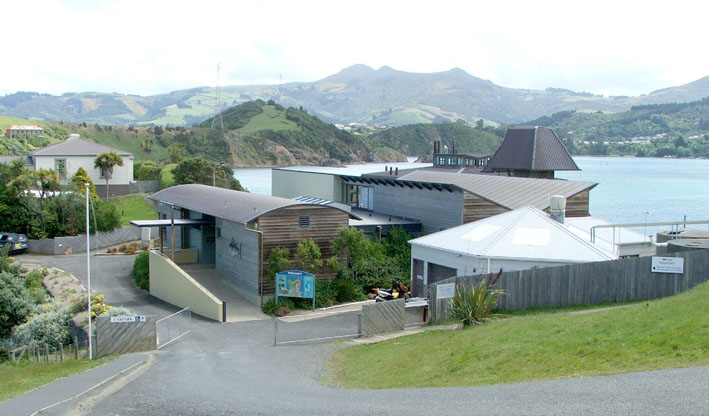
NZ Marine Studies Centre.

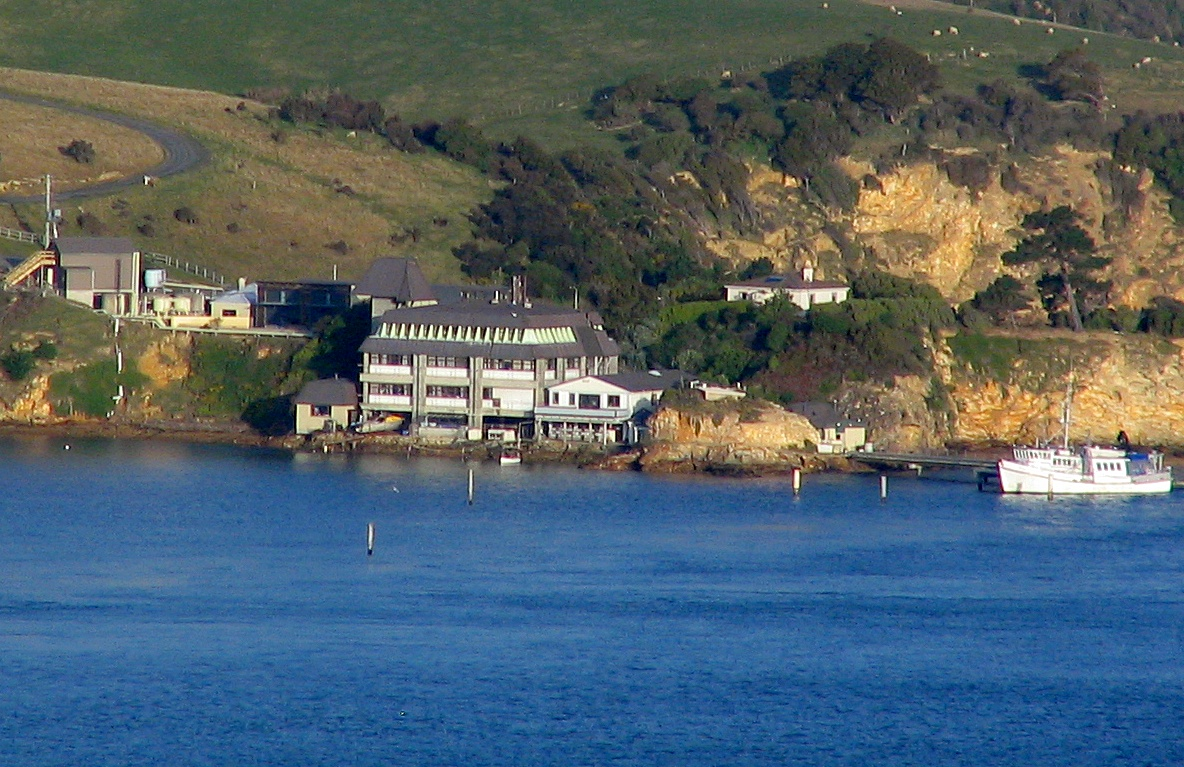
Portobello Marine Laboratory viewed from Port Chalmers.

The Portobello Marine Laboratory is located on the end of a short peninsula close to the township of Portobello, within the limits of the city of Dunedin in New Zealand's South Island. It is run as part of the University of Otago, the main campus of which is 23 kilometres to the southwest in Dunedin's main urban area.

== History ==
The laboratory is New Zealand and Oceania's oldest established marine research facility and was opened on 13 January 1904. It was originally proposed for Dunedin by leading MP and naturalist G. M. Thomson as a fish hatchery. Initially planned to be sited at Pūrākaunui, north of Port Chalmers, the current site on the shores of Otago Harbour was deemed more suitable.

The laboratory went through a period of revival in the 1950s, in which Elizabeth Joan Batham was a key player.

The laboratory is highly regarded worldwide for its facilities and research, and is an important asset to the university's Marine Science Department. The facility also includes the New Zealand Marine Studies Centre, which offers education programmes to pre-booked groups.

=== Aquarium closure and redevelopment ===
In 2012, it was announced that the aquarium was to be closed to the public after it was closed because of earthquake risk concerns. The building was built in the 1960s and had attracted about 20,000 visitors a year.

In 2013, it appeared that a new aquarium plan was "well underway." It appeared that the city was going to get a new aquarium was going to be built in the town rather than at Portobello.

In 2016, it was announced that the existing Portobello aquarium would be demolished to make way for a $3.5 million project, a temporary teaching and research facility in the same location. There were no plans to build a public aquarium on the old site, and the facility would be used until a new aquarium was built.

During the construction of the new teaching and research facility, further stabilisation work was required, which slowed construction. This also resulted in the budget going from $3.5 million to about $5 million. Mid 2017, the marine lab was set to open; it was still hoped that a new public aquarium would eventually be built in the central city.
