= Cape Saunders =

Headland on Muaūpoko peninsula

Coordinates: 45.873547°S 170.734706°E

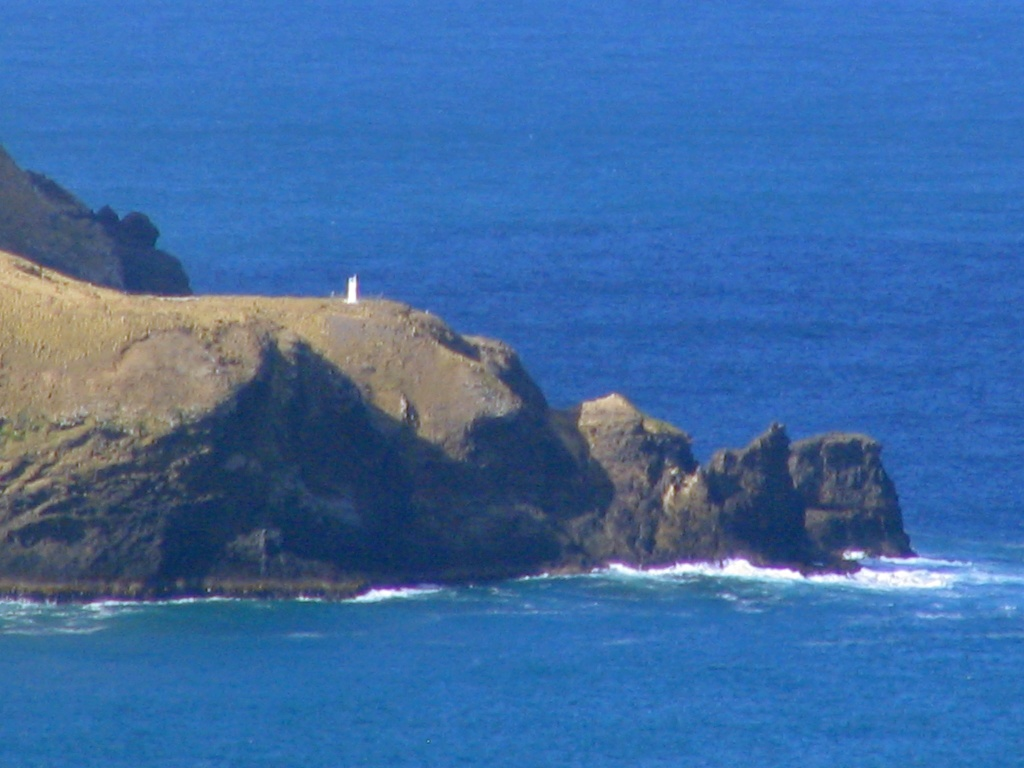
Cape Saunders lighthouse

Kaimata, or Cape Saunders, is the prominent headland on the Pacific Ocean coast of Muaupoko, the Otago Peninsula, in the far south-east of New Zealand's South Island. It is home to the Cape Saunders Lighthouse.

Captain James Cook sighted the landmark on 25 February 1770, and named it in honour of Admiral Sir Charles Saunders, under whom Cook had served in Canada in 1759.
