= Portobello, New Zealand =

Portobello
- Settlement
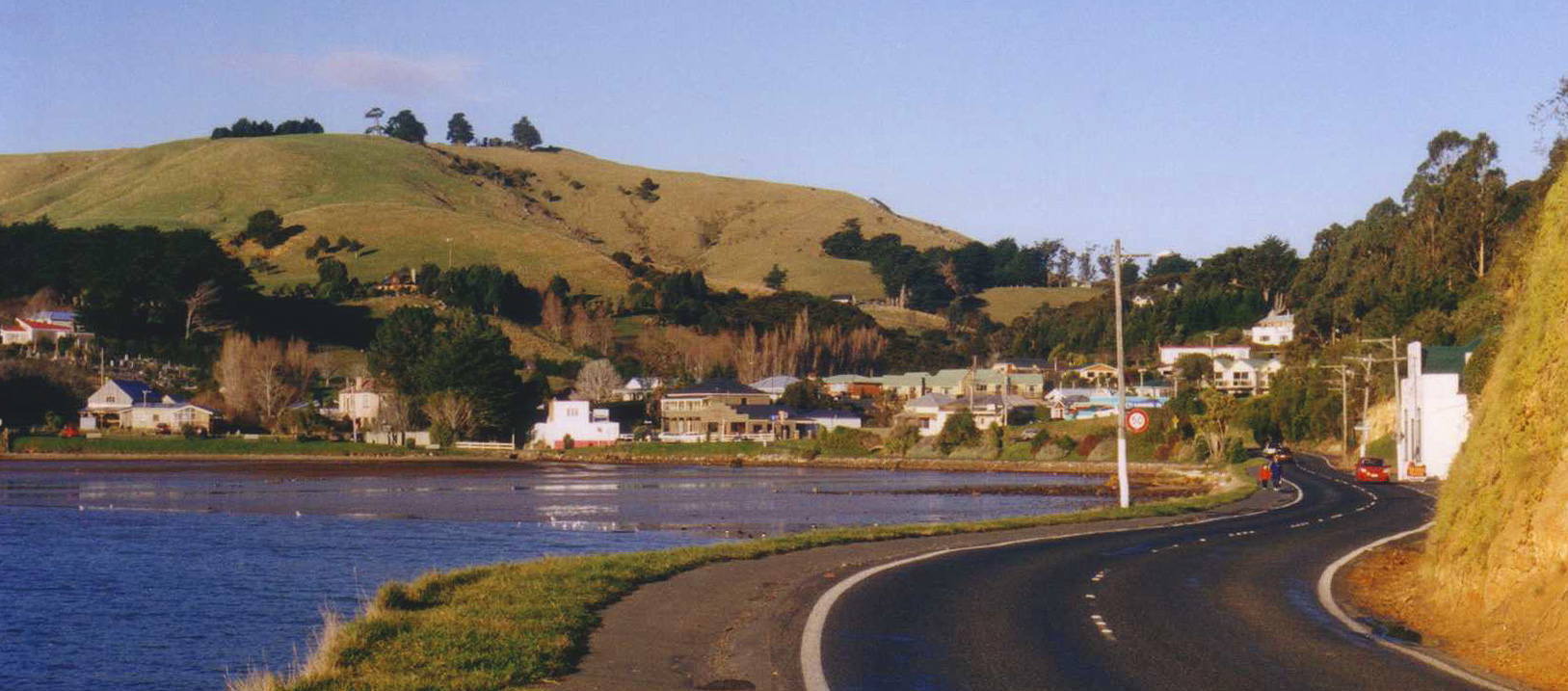
- Portobello
- Interactive map of Portobello
- Coordinates: 45.8398°S 170.6509°E
- Country: New Zealand
- Island: South Island
- Region: Otago
- Community board: Otago Peninsula Community Board
- Electorates: Dunedin; Te Tai Tonga (Māori)

Government
  - Territorial authority: Dunedin City Council
  - Regional council: Otago Regional Council
  - Mayor of Dunedin: Sophie Barker
  - Dunedin MP: Rachel Brooking
  - Te Tai Tonga MP: Tākuta Ferris

Area
  - Total: 1.97 km^{2} (0.76 sq mi)

Population (2018 Census)
  - Total: 594
  - Density: 302/km^{2} (781/sq mi)
- Time zone: UTC+12 (NZST)
  - Summer (DST): UTC+13 (NZDT)
- Area code: 03
- Local iwi: Ngāi Tahu

Portobello is a village beside the Otago Harbour halfway along the Otago Peninsula in Dunedin City, New Zealand. It lies at the foot of a small peninsula (Portobello Peninsula) on Latham Bay. The isthmus of the peninsula separates this bay from Lamlash Bay, part of the larger Portobello Bay.

Like scores of Dunedin features, Portobello was named after a locality in Edinburgh, Scotland, also called Portobello.

At the end of Portobello Peninsula sits a marine research station, the Portobello Marine Laboratory, which is part of the University of Otago. Close to the end of this peninsula lies Quarantine Island / Kamau Taurua.

Portobello features a Historical Society Museum, the 1908 Restaurant, a local primary school (Portobello School, Years 1-8), the old Portobello Hotel (a pub), a cafe and several accommodation providers, including a camping ground, bed and breakfasts and motels. A local dairy acts as the community's grocers, though most of the village's retail needs are served by Dunedin city.

A Buddhist stupa commemorating Geshe Dhargyey sits on a hillside close to Portobello. It was built and is maintained by Dunedin's Dhargyey Buddhist Centre. The Portobello Stupa was consecrated in 1996 by the 14th Dalai Lama, and honours the late Buddhist scholar Geshe Dhargyey. It is the southernmost stupa in the world.

The winding but well-surfaced Portobello Road runs along the edge of the harbour, connecting Portobello to the city. A multi-year project to raise and widen this road and add a 19km shared-use pathway, now named Te Aka Ōtākou, was completed in 2023, safely connecting Portobello to Dunedin for cyclists and walkers and allowing a full loop around the harbour via the ferry to Port Chalmers. A more convoluted but scenic route, Highcliff Road, connects Portobello with Dunedin city centre via the ridge of the peninsula.

Boating is an historical focus for Portobello. In the past, Portobello residents caught the ferry to the city, before the Portobello Road along the foreshore was constructed. Today, scheduled ferry service to Kamau Taurua and Port Chalmers departs from the recently renovated ferry jetty, a short distance from the centre of the village. A boating club maintains a slipway and boat shed near the jetty.

Portobello Community Inc. is the local community group, which works to improve Portobello for its community.

== Demographics ==
Historical population
Year	Pop.	±% p.a.
2006	501	—
2013	522	+0.59%
2018	594	+2.62%

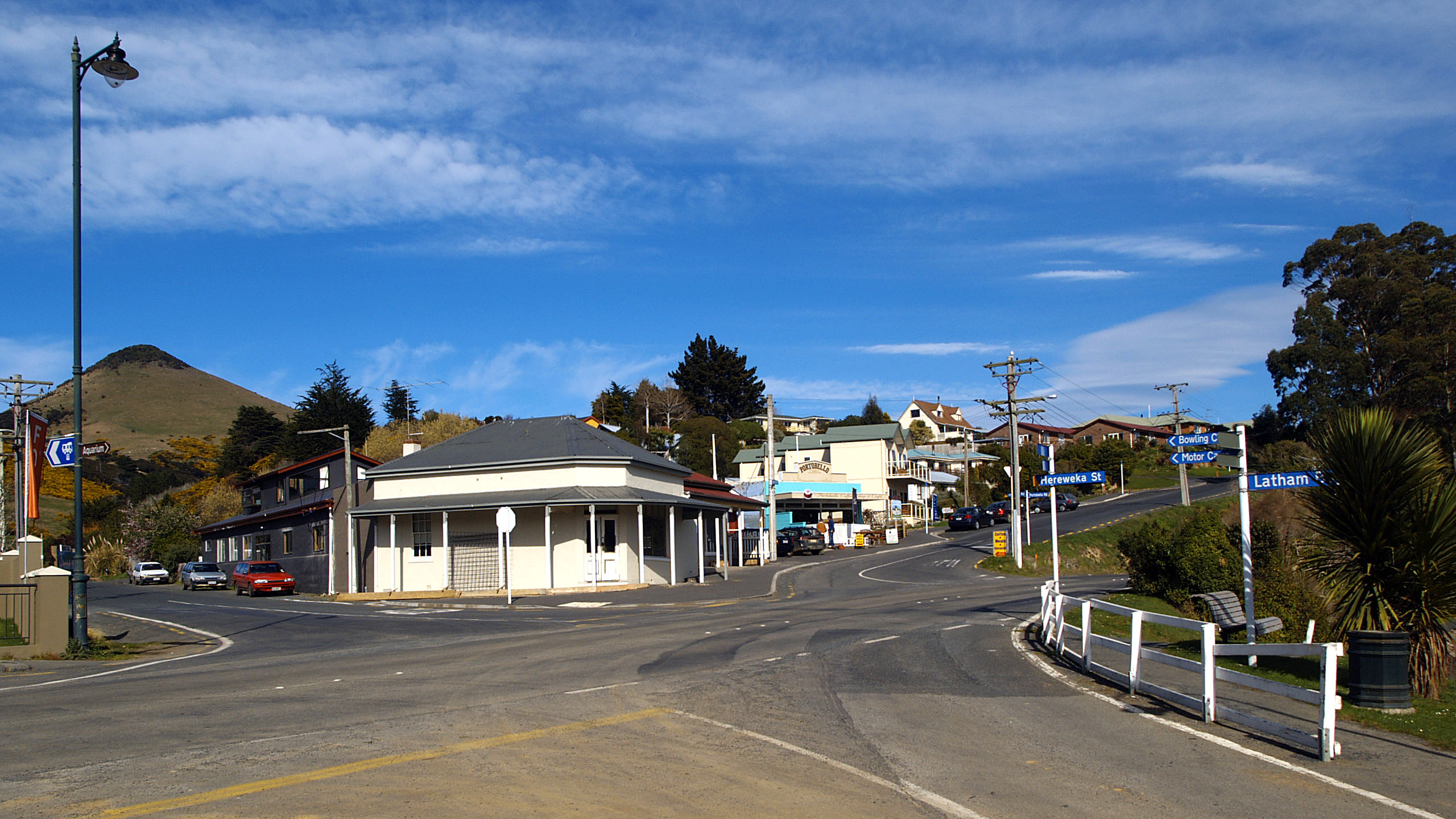
Portobello in 2007

Portobello covers 1.97 km^{2} (0.76 sq mi), and is part of the larger Broad Bay-Portobello statistical area.

Portobello had a population of 594 at the 2018 New Zealand census, an increase of 72 people (13.8%) since the 2013 census, and an increase of 93 people (18.6%) since the 2006 census. There were 237 households, comprising 300 males and 291 females, giving a sex ratio of 1.03 males per female, with 111 people (18.7%) aged under 15 years, 57 (9.6%) aged 15 to 29, 306 (51.5%) aged 30 to 64, and 117 (19.7%) aged 65 or older.

Ethnicities were 94.4% European/Pākehā, 11.6% Māori, 2.5% Pasifika, 1.5% Asian, and 2.0% other ethnicities. People may identify with more than one ethnicity.

Although some people chose not to answer the census's question about religious affiliation, 66.7% had no religion, 23.2% were Christian, 0.5% had Māori religious beliefs and 3.0% had other religions.

Of those at least 15 years old, 171 (35.4%) people had a bachelor's or higher degree, and 57 (11.8%) people had no formal qualifications. 93 people (19.3%) earned over $70,000 compared to 17.2% nationally. The employment status of those at least 15 was that 243 (50.3%) people were employed full-time, 84 (17.4%) were part-time, and 12 (2.5%) were unemployed.

== Education ==
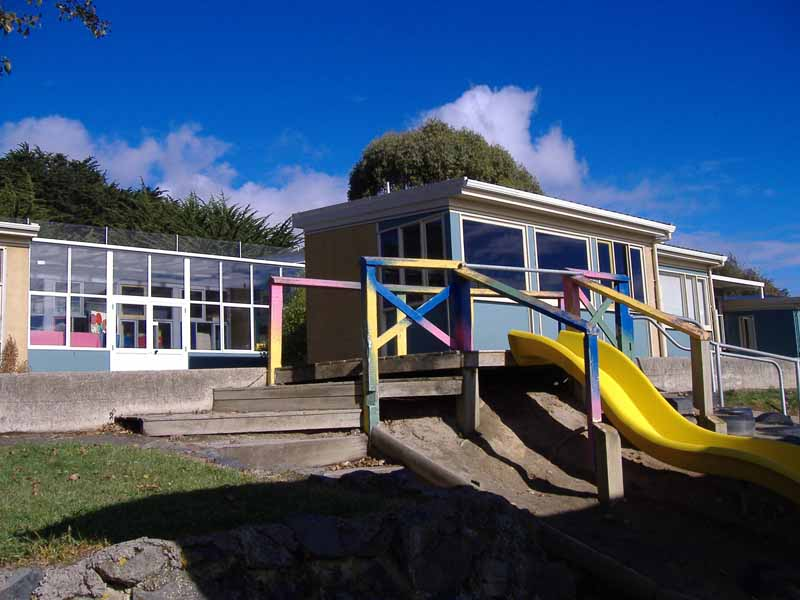
Portobello School

Portobello School is a state co-educational primary school for year 1 to 8 children, with a roll of 57 students as of July 2026. The school opened in 1857.
