= List of schools in Otago =

This is a list of schools in the Otago region of New Zealand's South Island.

== Waitaki District ==
Name	Years	Gender	Authority	Location	Territorial authority area	Decile (Note: The now-defunct socioeconomic decile measured the socioeconomic status of the school catchment area from 1 (the poorest areas) to 10 (the wealthiest areas).) (2015)	EQI (2025)	Roll (Note: The roll for each school changes frequently as students start school for the first time, move between schools, and graduate.) (March 2025)	Website	School number	Opening year
Ardgowan School	1–8	Coed	State	Oamaru	Waitaki	6	450	130		3704	1903
Duntroon School	1–8	Coed	State	Duntroon	Waitaki	9	423	100		3732	1879
East Otago High School	7–13	Coed	State	Palmerston	Waitaki	6	486	191		371	1856
Fenwick School	1–6	Coed	State	Oamaru	Waitaki	6	461	277		3707	2001
Five Forks School	1–8	Coed	State	Kakanui Valley	Waitaki	9	438	57		3738	1912
Flag Swamp School (closed 2020)	1–8	Coed	State	Waikouaiti	Waitaki	-	-	-	-	-	1869
Hampden School	1–8	Coed	State	Hampden	Waitaki	4	486	43		3746	1864
Kakanui School	1–8	Coed	State	Kakanui	Waitaki	5	450	40		3755	1873
Macraes Moonlight School	1–8	Coed	State	Macraes Flat	Waitaki	10	451	13		3764	1880
Maheno School	1–8	Coed	State	Maheno	Waitaki	6	432	84		3765	1875
Oamaru Intermediate	7–8	Coed	State	Oamaru	Waitaki	5	474	313		3784	Unknown
Omarama School	1–8	Coed	State	Omarama	Waitaki	7	440	29		3789	1930s
Otepopo School (closed 2010)	1–8	Coed	State	Herbert	Waitaki	-	-	-	-	-	1864
Palmerston School	1–6	Coed	State	Palmerston	Waitaki	6	458	97		3797	1867
Papakaio School	1–8	Coed	State	Papakaio	Waitaki	9	446	120		3798	1867
Pembroke School	1–6	Coed	State	Oamaru	Waitaki	3	494	226		3737	Unknown
St Joseph's School	1–8	Coed	State integrated (Catholic)	Oamaru	Waitaki	6	437	131		3825	1884
St Kevin's College	9–13	Coed	State integrated (Catholic, Boarding)	Oamaru	Waitaki	7	445	486		369	1927
Te Pākihi o Maru / Oamaru North School	1–6	Coed	State	Oamaru	Waitaki	4	506	127		3785	1872
Totara School	1–8	Coed	State	Alma	Waitaki	6	444	17		3847	1862
Waitaki Boys' High School	9–13	Boys	State (Boarding)	Oamaru	Waitaki	6	480	434		365	1883
Waitaki Girls' High School	9–13	Girls	State (Boarding)	Oamaru	Waitaki	6	479	420		366	1887
Waitaki Valley School	1–8	Coed	State	Kurow	Waitaki	8	440	106		363	2010
Weston School	1–8	Coed	State	Weston	Waitaki	8	435	238		3864	1869

== Central Otago District ==
Name	Years	Gender	Area	Authority	Decile	Roll	Website	MOE
Alexandra School	1–8	Coed	Alexandra	State	8	199		3701
Clyde School	1–8	Coed	Clyde	State	9	159		3725
Cromwell College	7–15	Coed	Cromwell	State	8	692		373
Cromwell Primary School	1–6	Coed	Cromwell	State	8	368		3729
Dunstan High School	9–13	Coed	Alexandra	State	9	599		372
Goldfields School	1–6	Coed	Cromwell	State	7	298		3741
Maniototo Area School	1–13	Coed	Ranfurly	State	7	147		370
Millers Flat School	1–8	Coed	Millers Flat	State	7	25		3771
Omakau School	1–8	Coed	Omakau	State	8	81		3788
Poolburn School	1–8	Coed	Oturehua	State	10	37		3802
Roxburgh Area School	1–13	Coed	Roxburgh	State	4	119		375
St Gerard's School	1–8	Coed	Alexandra	State integrated	9	153	-	3823
St John's School	1–8	Coed	Ranfurly	State integrated	7	65	-	3824
Tarras School	1–8	Coed	Tarras	State	10	20		3843
The Terrace School	1–8	Coed	Alexandra	State	8	274		3844

== Queenstown-Lakes District ==
Name	Years	Gender	Authority	Location	Territorial authority area	Roll	2015 decile	Current EQI	Website	School number	Opened
Arrowtown School	1–8	Coed	State	Arrowtown	Queenstown-Lakes	415	10	395		3930	1863
Glenorchy School	1–8	Coed	State	Glenorchy	Queenstown-Lakes	28	7	408		3955	1911
Hāwea Flat School	1–6	Coed	State	Hāwea Flat	Queenstown-Lakes	364	10	411		3747	1882
Holy Family School	1–8	Coed	State integrated (Catholic)	Wānaka	Queenstown-Lakes	189	10	387		557	2006
KingsView School	1–8	Coed	State integrated	Frankton	Queenstown-Lakes	64	10	398		633	1996
Makarora Primary School	1–8	Coed	State	Makarora	Queenstown-Lakes	11	7	390		3767	1994
Makarora Primary School (closed 1987)	1–8	Coed	State	Makarora	Queenstown-Lakes	-	-	-	-	-	1969
Makarora Primary School (closed 1946)	1–8	Coed	State	Makarora	Queenstown-Lakes	-	-	-	-	-	1895
Queenstown Primary School	1–8	Coed	State	Queenstown	Queenstown-Lakes	569	10	402		4005	1975
Remarkables Primary School	1–8	Coed	State	Frankton	Queenstown-Lakes	440	10	398		6783	2010
Shotover Primary School	1–8	Coed	State	Shotover Country	Queenstown-Lakes	554	-	396		586	2015
St Joseph's School	1–8	Coed	State integrated (Catholic)	Queenstown	Queenstown-Lakes	138	10	389		4016	1883
Te Kura o Take Kārara	1–6	Coed	State	Wānaka	Queenstown-Lakes	311	-	408		747	2020
Wakatipu High School	9–13	Coed	State	Frankton	Queenstown-Lakes	1,464	10	415		374	1937
Wānaka Primary School	1–6	Coed	State	Wānaka	Queenstown-Lakes	454	10	396		1167	1979

== Dunedin City ==
=== Primary and intermediate schools ===
Name	Years	Gender	Authority	Location	Territorial authority area	Decile	Roll	Website	School number	Opened
Abbotsford School	1–8	Coed	State	Abbotsford	Dunedin City	7	275		3700	1953
Amana Christian School	1–8	Coed	Private	Mosgiel	Dunedin City	9	59		1641	2001
Andersons Bay School	1–6	Coed	State	Andersons Bay	Dunedin City	10	272		3703	1858
Arthur Street School	1–8	Coed	State	City Rise	Dunedin City	8	196		3706	1864
Balaclava School	1–6	Coed	State	Balaclava	Dunedin City	8	243		3709	1964
Balmacewen Intermediate School	7–8	Coed	State	Wakari	Dunedin City	9	474		3711	1964
Bathgate Park School	1–8	Coed	State	Forbury	Dunedin City	3	115		647	2011
Big Rock Primary School	1–8	Coed	State	Brighton	Dunedin City	5	100		607	2008
Bradford School	1–6	Coed	State	Bradford	Dunedin City	4	92		3716	
Broad Bay School	1–8	Coed	State	Broad Bay	Dunedin City	9	23		3718	1877
Brockville School	1–8	Coed	State	Brockville	Dunedin City	2	121		3719	
Carisbrook School	1–8	Coed	State	Caversham	Dunedin City	2	327		648	
Concord School	1–6	Coed	State	Concord	Dunedin City	3	62		3727	
Dunedin North Intermediate	7-8	Coed	State	Dunedin North	Dunedin City	6	297		3731	
Dunedin Rudolf Steiner School	1-8	Coed	State integrated (Rudolf Steiner)	Maia	Dunedin City	7	83		1192	
East Taieri School	1-6	Coed	State	Mosgiel	Dunedin City	9	290		3733	
Elmgrove School	1-6	Coed	State	Mosgiel	Dunedin City	6	288		3778	
Fairfield School	1-8	Coed	State	Fairfield	Dunedin City	10	477		3736	
George Street Normal School	1-6	Coed	State	Dunedin North	Dunedin City	0	372		3740	
Grants Braes School	1-6	Coed	State	Waverley	Dunedin City	10	199		3742	
Green Island School	1-8	Coed	State	Green Island	Dunedin City	4	165		3743	
Halfway Bush School	1-6	Coed	State	Halfway Bush	Dunedin City	10	34		3745	
Kaikorai Primary School	1-6	Coed	State	Roslyn	Dunedin City	9	283		3753	
Karitane School	1-6	Coed	State	Karitane	Dunedin City	5	29		3756	
Lee Stream School	1-8	Coed	State	Lee Stream	Dunedin City	8	9		3761	
Liberton Christian School	1-8	Coed	State integrated (Christian)	Pine Hill	Dunedin City	8	125		4117	
Macandrew Bay School	1-6	Coed	State	Macandrew Bay	Dunedin City	10	122		3762	
Maori Hill School	1-6	Coed	State	Maori Hill	Dunedin City	10	241		3768	
Mornington School	1-8	Coed	State	Mornington	Dunedin City	8	218		3776	
Musselburgh School	1-6	Coed	State	Musselburgh	Dunedin City	5	136		3779	
North East Valley Normal School	1-6	Coed	State	North East Valley	Dunedin City	6	211		3783	
Opoho School	1-6	Coed	State	Opoho	Dunedin City	9	127		3790	
Outram School	1-8	Coed	State	Outram	Dunedin City	9	182		3795	
Pine Hill School	1-6	Coed	State	Pine Hill	Dunedin City	3	53		3801	
Port Chalmers School	1-8	Coed	State	Port Chalmers	Dunedin City	5	88		3803	
Portobello School	1-8	Coed	State	Portobello	Dunedin City	8	57		3805	
Pūrākaunui School	1-8	Coed	State	Pūrākaunui	Dunedin City	6	15		3807	
Ravensbourne School	1-6	Coed	State	Ravensbourne	Dunedin City	6	16		3808	
Sacred Heart School	1-8	Coed	State integrated	North East Valley	Dunedin City	7	60		3815	
Sawyers Bay School	1-6	Coed	State	Sawyers Bay	Dunedin City		91	7	3817	
Silverstream (South) Primary School	1-6	Coed	State	Mosgiel	Dunedin City	4	292		1657	
St Bernadette's School	1-6	Coed	State integrated	Forbury	Dunedin City	5	167		3819	
St Brigid's School	1-6	Coed	State integrated	Tainui	Dunedin City	10	57		3820	1939
St Clair School	1-6	Coed	State	Saint Clair	Dunedin City	6	377		3835	
St Francis Xavier School	1-6	Coed	State integrated	Maryhill	Dunedin City	8	93		3822	
St Joseph's Cathedral School	1-6	Coed	State integrated	City Rise	Dunedin City	8	147		3827	
St Leonards School	1-6	Coed	State	Saint Leonards	Dunedin City	10	12		3829	
St Mary's School (Dunedin)	1-6	Coed	State integrated	Wakari	Dunedin City	6	57		3830	
St Mary's School (Mosgiel)	1-8	Coed	State integrated	Mosgiel	Dunedin City	8	135		3832	
St Peter Chanel School	1-8	Coed	State integrated	Green Island	Dunedin City	8	46		3834	
Strath Taieri School	1-8	Coed	State	Middlemarch	Dunedin City		44		3837	
Tahuna Normal Intermediate School	7-8	Coed	State	Musselburgh	Dunedin City	8	514		3839	
Tainui School	1-6	Coed	State	Tainui	Dunedin City	8	241		3841	1929
Waikouaiti School	1-6	Coed	State	Waikouaiti	Dunedin City	7	86		3852	1860
Waitati School	1-8	Coed	State	Waitati	Dunedin City	9	58		3857	1864
Wakari School	1-6	Coed	State	Wakari	Dunedin City	8	300		3859	1858
Warrington School	1-8	Coed	State	Warrington	Dunedin City	9	46		3862	1879

=== Secondary and composite schools ===
Name	School number	Years	Gender	Area	Authority	Opened	Roll	Website	Notes
Bayfield High School	382	9–13	Coed	Musselburgh	State	1961	580		
Columba College	386	1–13	Coed/Girls	Roslyn	State integrated	1915	586		Presbyterian, boarding. Coeducational years 1–6, girls only years 7–13.
John McGlashan College	387	7–13	Boys	Maori Hill	State integrated	1918	533		Presbyterian, boarding
Kaikorai Valley College	381	7–13	Coed	Kaikorai	State	1958	457		
King's High School	383	9–13	Boys	Forbury	State	1936	874		
Logan Park High School	376	9–13	Coed	Dunedin North	State	1975	1,109		
Otago Boys' High School	377	9–13	Boys	City Rise	State	1863	868		Boarding
Otago Girls' High School	378	9–13	Girls	City Rise	State	1871	724		
Queen's High School	384	9–13	Girls	Forbury	State	1955	611		
Sara Cohen School	3816	–	Coed	Caversham	State	1926	65		Special needs
St Hilda's Collegiate School	380	7–13	Girls	City Rise	State integrated	1896	468		Anglican, boarding
Taieri College	495	7–13	Coed	Mosgiel	State	2004	1,255		
Te Kura Kaupapa Māori o Ōtepoti	2351	1–13	Coed	Fairfield	State	1994	61		Māori language school
Trinity Catholic College	536	7–13	Coed	City Rise	State integrated	1989	781		Catholic

=== Former schools ===
- Brighton School, Brighton, merged with Ocean View School to form Big Rock Primary School, July 2008.
- Calton Hill School, Caversham School, and College Street School, merged on the Caversham site, with a satellite campus at the Calton Hill site, in January 2012 to form Carisbrook School.
- Corstorphine School, closed July 2010 due to declining roll numbers.
- Forbury School and Macandrew Intermediate merged on the Macandrew Intermediate site in January 2012 to form Bathgate Park School.
- High Street School, Dunedin, closed February 2011 due to declining roll numbers.
- Kenmure Intermediate School and Kaikorai Valley High School combined in 1996 to become Kaikorai College.
- King Edward Technical College, closed 1974 and replaced with Logan Park High School.
- Momona School, Henley School merged with Outram School in 2004.
- Moreau College, merged with St Paul's High School in 1989 to form Kavanagh College.
- Ocean View School, Ocean View, closed and merged with Brighton School to form Big Rock Primary School, July 2008.
- Rotary Park School, Waverley – state contributing primary, closed 2012.
- St Joseph's School, Port Chalmers - state integrated primary, closed 2023
- St Patrick's School, closed April 2011 due to declining roll numbers.
- Tomahawk School, closed April 2010 due to declining roll numbers.
- Waldronville School, closed April 2010 due to declining roll numbers.

== Clutha District ==
Name	Years	Gender	Area	Authority	Decile	Roll	Website	School number
Balclutha School	1–8	Coed	Balclutha	State	5	204		3710
Blue Mountain College	7–13	Coed	Tapanui	State	7	235		391
Clinton School	1–8	Coed	Clinton	State	4	67		3723
Clutha Valley School	1–8	Coed	Clydevale	State	9	92		3724
Heriot School	1–6	Coed	Heriot	State	8	70		3749
Kaitangata School	1–8	Coed	Kaitangata	State	4	96	-	3754
Lawrence Area School	1–13	Coed	Lawrence	State	6	129		390
Milton School	1–6	Coed	Milton	State	4	94		3772
Romahapa School	1–8	Coed	Romahapa	State	4	55		3811
Rosebank School	1–8	Coed	Balclutha	State	6	217		3812
South Otago High School	9–13	Coed	Balclutha	State	6	539		393
St Joseph's School	1–8	Coed	Balclutha	State integrated	7	62	-	3826
St Mary's School	1–6	Coed	Milton	State integrated	4	62		3831
Stirling School	1–8	Coed	Stirling	State	7	69		3836
Tahakopa School	1–8	Coed	Tahakopa	State	9			3838
Taieri Beach School	1–8	Coed	Taieri Mouth	State	5	4	-	3840
Tapanui School	1–6	Coed	Tapanui	State	7	68		3842
The Catlins Area School	1–13	Coed	Owaka	State	6	122		394
Tokoiti School	1–6	Coed	Milton	State	4	29		3845
Tokomairiro High School	7–13	Coed	Milton	State	5	204		392
Waihola District School	1–8	Coed	Waihola	State	6	21	-	3850
Waikoikoi School	1–6	Coed	Waikoikoi	State	8	8		3851
Waitahuna School	1–6	Coed	Waitahuna	State	7	3	-	3855
Waiwera South School	1–8	Coed	Waiwera South	State	7	26		3858
Warepa School	1–8	Coed	Warepa	State	9	60		3861
