= DePriest =

DePriest or De Priest is a surname, and may refer to:

- Ida Clark DePriest (c.1869–1938), American suffragist
- Jessie De Priest (1870–1961), American music teacher
- Margaret DePriest (1931–2025), American actress
- Oscar Stanton De Priest (1871–1951), American politician and civil rights advocate
- Peyton DePriest (born 1999), American soccer player
- Trey DePriest (born 1993), American football player

== See also ==
- Priest (surname)
