= List of cemeteries in New Zealand =

Hastings

This is a list of some of the cemeteries in New Zealand.

== North Island ==
=== Whangarei District ===
- Maunu Cemetery

also Kaurihorore, Onerahi, Kamo, Ngunguru, Whangarei Heads, Kioreroa, Mission Ground, Whananaki, Marua

=== Auckland ===
- Auckland Memorial Park
- Birkenhead-Glenfield Cemetery
- Hillsborough Cemetery
- Mangere Lawn Cemetery
- Manukau Memorial Gardens
- North Shore Memorial Park
- Papakura Cemetery
- Papakura South Cemetery
- Pukekohe Cemetery
- Purewa Cemetery
- St Peter's in the Forest Cemetery
- Symonds Street Cemetery
- Waikumete Cemetery
- Waiuku Cemetery

=== Wellington ===
- Wellington City
  - Bolton Street Memorial Park
  - Karori Cemetery
  - Makara Cemetery
  - Mount Street Cemetery
  - also Johnsonville Methodist Cemetery, St John's Anglican Church (Johnsonville), St Mary's Anglican Church (Karori), Linden Cemetery, St Matthias (Makara), Holy Trinity Anglican Church (Ohariu Valley), Ohariu Valley Catholic Cemetery, Tawa Anglican Churchyard.
- Hutt City
  - Taitā Cemetery
  - also Christ Church (Taitā), Wesleyan Cemetery (Memorial in Bridge Street, Lower Hutt), Knox Presbyterian Church (Lower Hutt), Korokoro Catholic Cemetery, Owhiti Maori Cemetery (Seaview), St James Anglican Church (Lower Hutt), Te Puni Cemetery (Petone), Wainuiomata Methodist Church, Somes Island Cemetery, Waiwhetu Marae.
- Upper Hutt City
  - Akatarawa Cemetery
  - also St John's Anglican Churchyard (Trentham), St Joseph's Catholic Burial Ground, Wallaceville Cemetery.
- Porirua City
  - Whenua Tapu Cemetery
  - also Porirua Cemetery, Pauatahanui Burial Ground, St Joseph's Church Graveyard.

=== Elsewhere ===
- Hamilton Park Cemetery, Hamilton
- Park Island Cemetery, Napier
- Te Henui Cemetery, New Plymouth

== South Island ==
=== Christchurch ===
- Addington Cemetery
- Avonhead Cemetery
- Barbadoes Street Cemetery, Christchurch's oldest cemetery, located in the central city
- Bromley Cemetery
- Graveyard at Holy Trinity Avonside
- Linwood Cemetery, Christchurch
- Memorial Park Cemetery, Christchurch
- Ruru Lawn Cemetery
- St. Paul's Cemetery, Christchurch
- Waimairi Cemetery
- Woolston Cemetery

=== Dunedin ===
- Andersons Bay Cemetery
- Arthur Street Cemetery, Dunedin's first cemetery, on City Rise. All bodies later moved elsewhere
- Broad Bay Cemetery
- Dunedin Cemetery, Waldronville
- Dunedin Northern Cemetery
- Dunedin Southern Cemetery
- Macadrew Bay Cemetery
- Port Chalmers Cemetery
- Portobello Cemetery
- Waitati Cemetery

=== Elsewhere ===
- Wakapuaka Cemetery, Nelson
- Queenstown-Lakes District: Albert Town, Arrowtown, Cardrona, Frankton, Glenorchy, Kingston, Makarora, Queenstown, Skippers Point, Wanaka, Lake Hawea.
- Central Otago District: Alexandra, Clyde, Cromwell, Ranfurly, Naseby (Council); Blackstone Hill, Danseys Pass/Kyeburn Diggings, Drybread, Ettrick, Gimmerburn, Ida Valley/Moa Creek, Kyeburn-Kokonga/Swinburn, Kyeburn Diggings, Millers Flat, Omakau/Blacks, Roxburgh, St. Bathans Public and Church, St. Bathans Catholic, Tarras (Cemetery Trust); Hamiltons, Nevis (closed).
- Clutha District: Balclutha, Fairfax (Tokoiti), Kaitangata, Lawrence, Tapanui (urban); Port Molyneux, Romahapa, Taieri Beach, Waihola, Waikoikoi, Waipahi, Waipori, Waitahuna (rural); Clinton, Crookston, Owaka, Tuapeka (Cemetery Trust).
- Southland District: Edendale, Lumsden, Wallacetown, Woodlands, Wyndham, Centre Hill, Otautau, Wairio, Wreys Bush, Dipton, East Winton, Winton, Lynwood, Halfmoon Bay, Riverton (Council); Athol, Balfour, Calcium, Forest Hill, Fortrose, Garston, Orepuki, Quarry Hills, Riversdale, Tuatapere, Waikaia, Waikawa (Cemetery Trust).
- Gore District: Otaraia, Charlton Park, Gore, Mataura, Pukerau, Waikaka.
- Invercargill City: Eastern, Saint John's, Bluff, Green Point.
