= William Priest =

New Zealand doctor and cricketer (1909–1972)

Personal information
- Full name: William Alexander Priest
- Born: 18 March 1909; Dunedin, New Zealand
- Died: 8 December 1972 (aged 63); Wanganui, New Zealand
- Batting: Right-handed

Domestic team information
- Years: Team
- 1931/32–1932/33: Otago
- FC debut: 25 December 1931 Otago v Canterbury
- Last FC: 24 December 1932 Otago v Wellington

Career statistics
Competition	First-class
Matches	2
Runs scored	6
Batting average	1.50
100s/50s	0/0
Top score	4
Catches/stumpings	0/–
- Source: ESPNcricinfo, 21 May 2016

William Alexander Priest (18 March 1909 – 8 December 1972), also known as Alec Priest, was a New Zealand doctor and cricketer. He played two first-class matches in the Plunket Shield for Otago in the early 1930s and played in the Hawke Cup for Taranaki and Wanganui. Professionally he was a specialist in the treatment of tuberculosis who worked in a number of New Zealand hospitals and conducted research on a travelling scholarship in the 1950s.

== Early life ==
Priest was born at Dunedin in 1909. He was educated at Musselburgh and at Otago Boys' High School where he played a variety of sports. He captained the Otago schools representative cricket team whilst at school, playing alongside Vern Leader, Don Cameron and Vic Cavenagh, all of whom went on to play for Otago in representative cricket.

After leaving school Priest went up to the University of Otago in Dunedin. He graduated with a medical degree in 1934, initially working at Dunedin Hospital. Whilst he was a student Priest enlisted in the Otago Regiment (Note: At the time Priest enlisted the Otago Regiment was a reserve formation used for training purposes.) and was appointed as a second lieutenant with the Otago University Medical Company in 1932; during World War II he volunteered for overseas service and served with the Royal New Zealand Air Force.

== Cricket ==
With a good reputation as a school cricketer, Priest played club cricket for Carisbrook Cricket Club in Dunedin. He was a batsman who immediately made a "good impression" with the team in 1929. The Evening Star described him as "a most promising young batsman", saying that "he kept the ball down, punished the loose stuff, and made a good job of any ball that asked to be driven to the off boundary", whilst the Otago Daily Times reported that his "driving and square cutting were always well timed" and predicted that he would become a "very valuable" member of the team. Later in the same year the paper described him as a "stylish batsman", albeit one who had made a run of scores all in the 30s.

By the start of the 1931–32 season he had moved from Carisbrook to play for the Dunedin University team, playing in its first season in the senior competition, by which time The Star, a Christchurch newspaper, was describing him as a "well-known" cricketer with "sound batting knowledge" who had "for so long been a consistent batsman". In December, after showing "good form", he was selected for the Otago squad for the Plunket Shield matches against Canterbury and Auckland. The Star described him as "a solid and consistent batsman who has shown improved form since he went from Carisbrook to the University eleven. Last season he put together some useful scores for Carisbrook, and this season has scored 161 runs with an average of 40.25. He has a good range of scoring shots, being especially strong on the off-drive", although the paper thought that he may be the Otago twelfth man for the Shield match against Canterbury.

=== Otago cricketer ===
In the event, Priest did make his first-class cricket debut for Otago in the match against Canterbury which started on Christmas Day 1931. He was "clean bowled" for a duck in his first innings as Otago were bowled out for 161 runs. In its second innings, the Otago team scored 589 in what was described as "one of the greatest batting recoveries ever known in New Zealand cricket", an innings which saw a Plunket Shield record score of 338 not out by Roger Blunt. Priest, however, recorded a pair, being caught without scoring, and was twelfth man for the team's following Shield match against Auckland and not included in the squad for the team's final representative match of the season against Wellington, (Note: At the time the Plunket Shield was only contested by four representative teams, Auckland, Canterbury, Otago and Wellington. As a result each team typically played three first-class matches a season.) although the Otago Daily Times' cricket correspondent reported that he had been "unlucky" against Canterbury.

Priest continued to impress in local cricket at the start of the 1932–33 season, The Evening Star describing him as "a solid batsman possessed of some nice clean strokes" and praising his play to the on-side. He played for an Otago team against one from North Otago in early December, and after batting well at the start of the season he was selected again for the Otago representative team for the Plunket Shield match against Wellington over the Christmas period, replacing the captain George Dickinson. He scored six runs in the match, making two in Otago's first innings and four in their second, although he injured his eye after colliding with Alex Knight whilst fielding and dropped down to twelfth man in the team's following match. He did not play in Otago's other Shield match of the season as the team won the trophy for the second time. (Note: The Plunket Shield was first contested in 1906–07. Otago had first won the trophy in 1924–25 and after their victory in 1932–33 did not win it again until 1950–51.) He did, however, play for the Otago team which played Southland in April 1933, (Note: Otago played Southland, which had previously played some first-class matches, annually until the 1980s.) and in October was in an Otago Selectors XI to play a team of young players.

=== Taranaki and later career ===
In October 1934 Priest announced that he would only be able to play for University until the Christmas period, after which he would be moving to New Plymouth on New Zealand's North Island. (Note: Dunedin is in the south of New Zealand's South Island.) He subsequently played for Taranaki, captaining the team against a touring English team in early 1936. (Note: The English touring team was not a full Test match team, although it did play first-class matches against each of the New Zealand representative teams and two matches against a New Zealand XI. The team, which toured under the name of the Marylebone Cricket Club, is generally considered to have been an England Second XI at the time.) When he returned to the Otago area he played for Maniototo, captaining the team in 1940 against an Otago XI, and then became a key figure in cricket in Wanganui when he moved there in the 1940s, captaining the team in 1945–46 and 1948–49. He played for Taranaki against Wanganui in the Hawke Cup in 1935–36 and for Wanganui against Taranaki in the competition in 1945–46.

Although he was considered to have been "past his best form" when he played for Wanganui, Priest still made good scores in a number of innings, and was elected President of the association in 1950. He was active in promoting and coaching cricket in Wanganui and the cricket pavilion at Victoria Park, Wanganui's home ground, is named after him.

== Professional career ==
After initially working at the Dunedin Hospital, in 1934 Priest was appointed to work at New Plymouth Hospital, leaving Otago at Christmas. He remained at New Plymouth for two years and later worked for a year at Cashmere Sanatorium near Christchurch, before moving to Central Otago to work in a sanatorium for tuberculosis patients at Waipiata which had been opened in 1923. After serving during World War II in the Royal New Zealand Air Force, he was appointed to Wanganui hospital as a chest specialist, initially serving as the tuberculosis officer at the hospital.

In 1951 Priest became the first New Zealander to be awarded the Wunderly Travelling Scholarship by the Royal Australasian College of Physicians. The scholarship was established by Harry Wyatt Wunderly to enable doctors from Australia and New Zealand to study thoracic diseases. Priest was afforded a year's leave of absence to take up the scholarship, travelling to study how tuberculosis was treated in Britain and Scandanvia. Afterwards he returned to work at Wanganui, remaining at the hospital until his death in 1972.

In 1953, Priest was awarded the Queen Elizabeth II Coronation Medal.

== Family ==
Priest married Ethna Roberts at Whakatāne in April 1939. The couple had four sons, one of whom died in infancy. Their other three sons all played cricket; one, David, for Wanganui and Wairarapa in the Hawke Cup. Priest died at Wanganui in 1972, aged 63, and is buried at Aramoho Cemetery; an obituary appeared in the New Zealand Medical Journal in 1973. His wife lived until 2002.
