= Tim Priest =

Tim Priest may refer to:

- Tim Priest (police officer), Australian police officer
- Tim Priest (American football) (born 1949), American attorney, broadcaster and former football player
