= John Leader =

John Leader may refer to:

- John Leader (cricketer), New Zealand cricketer and mountaineer, known as Vernon Leader
- John Temple Leader, English politician and connoisseur
- John Francis Leader, Irish psychologist and cognitive scientist
