= Priest (surname) =

Priest is a surname, and may refer to:

- Adam Priest (born 1996), American professional wrestler
- Alan Priest (1898–1969), American art historian
- Alfred Priest (1810–1850), British painter
- Alfred Priest (portraitist) (1874–1929), British painter
- Arthur Priest (1887–1937), British fireman and shipwreck survivor
- Becky Priest, American country music singer-songwriter and musician
- Cathy Priest, married name of Catherine LeFrançois (born 1971), Canadian bodybuilder, wife of Lee Priest
- Charles R. Priest (born 1946), American lawyer and politician from Maine
- Cherie Priest (born 1975), American writer
- Chris Priest (footballer) (born 1973), English footballer
- Christopher Priest (comic book writer) (born 1961), American comic book writer
- Christopher Priest (novelist) (1943–2024), British author
- Clay Priest (born 1989), Australian rugby league footballer
- Damian Priest (born 1982), American professional wrestler
- Dana Priest (born 1957), American journalist, writer and teacher
- Daniel Priest (1814–1883), Australian bushranger
- Daniel B. Priest (1830–1870), American lawyer and politician from Wisconsin
- Degory Priest (c.1579–c.1621), Mayflower passenger
- Doug Priest (born 1947), Australian rules footballer
- Eddie Priest (born 1974), American baseball player
- Eric Priest (born 1943), British mathematician
- Fred Priest (1875–1922), English footballer and manager
- George L. Priest (1947–2024), American legal scholar
- Graham Priest (born 1948), British philosopher
- Hannah Priest (born 1992), Australian rules footballer
- Henry Samuel Priest (1853–1930), American judge
- Irwin G. Priest (1886–1932), American physicist
- Ivy Baker Priest (1905–1975), American politician
- James M. Priest (1819–1883), Liberian lawyer and politician
- Jason Priest (born 1968), American politician from Montana
- Joanna Priest (1910–1997), Australian ballerina and choreographer
- Joanne Priest, Australian actress
- John G. Priest (1822–1900), American businessman and civic leader
- John T. Priest (1843–1912), American public servant
- John W. Priest (1825–1859), American architect
- Johnny Priest (1891-1979), American baseball player
- Josiah Priest (1788–1861), American writer
- Josias Priest (c.1645–1734), English dancer and choreographer
- Joy Priest, American poet and academic
- Killah Priest (born 1970), American rapper
- Langford Wellman Colley-Priest (1890–1928), Australian stretcher bearer
- Lee Priest (born 1972), Australian bodybuilder
- Lorraine Priest (born 1966), British rhythmic gymnast
- Margaret Priest (born 1944), Canadian artist and educator
- Mark Priest (born 1961), New Zealand cricketer
- Martin Priest (born 1957), American murderer
- Marvin Priest (born 1981), Australian singer-songwriter
- Maxi Priest (born 1961), British reggae singer
- Micael Priest (1951–2018), American artist
- Mijamin Priest (1808–1884), American religious leader and politicia
- Pat Priest (actress) (born 1936), American actress
- Pat Priest (judge) (1940–2018), American judge from Tecas
- Patricia Priest, New Zealand public health scientist, epidemiologist
- Percy Priest (1900–1956), American journalist and politician from Tennesee
- Philip Priest (born 1966), English footballer
- Rachel Priest (born 1985), New Zealand cricketer
- Robert Priest (born 1951), Canadian poet and writer
- Selina Priest (born 1990), Australian rules footballer
- Sharon Priest (born 1947), Canadian-American politician
- Skip Priest (born 1950), American politician from Washington State
- Stephen Priest (born 1954), British philosopher
- Steve Priest (1948–2020), British bass player
- Terri Priest (1928–2014), American artist
- Tim Priest (American football) (born 1949), American lawyer and gridiron football player
- Tim Priest (police officer), Australian police officer and author
- Toby Priest (born 1974/5), Australian politician
- William Priest (1909–1972), New Zealand doctor and cricketer

== See also ==
- Prest (surname)
