= Isabella Anderson =

New Zealand pioneer (1826–1905)

Isabella Anderson (née Allan, 1826–1905) was a New Zealand pioneer. She gave birth to the first Pākehā child born in Dunedin.

== Early life ==
Anderson was born in Ayrshire, Scotland to John and Agnes Allan in 1826. The family of ten (four daughters, four sons and both parents) emigrated to Nelson on board the ship New Zealand, arriving in 1842. Two years later she married John Anderson, and her sister Janet married Alexander McKay, who had emigrated to New Zealand from Scotland with John and his father James in 1840. The two newly-wed couples and John's father decided to move to Otago as they had heard that a Scottish settlement was planned for the province. They hoped to start farming there. Just before leaving Nelson, they heard that the New Zealand Company, which was responsible for planning the settlement, had closed and that all plans were on hold. However, as their preparations were already made, the group decided to make the journey regardless. The voyage took six weeks, on the chartered ship Ann and Sarah, arriving in Dunedin on 30 December 1844. Anderson gave birth to a son, named James after her father-in-law, shortly before disembarking.

== Adult life ==
The Andersons settled in an inlet which would later be named Andersons Bay after them. Anderson's sister and her husband settled at Port Chalmers and the sisters often visited each other by boat. Anderson learnt to shoot, and provided for the family by shooting native quail. She was often accompanied on her shooting trips by a young Māori woman, Akina.

On 30 December 1846, Anderson gave birth to a son, named John after her husband, who is considered to be the first European child born in Dunedin.

In 1849, after John's father died, the couple moved to Port Chalmers and then in 1853 moved to East Taieri and later to Tapanui. In 1862 they bought land at Waiwera and farmed there. After John's death, Anderson continued to farm the land until her death in 1905.

There is a memorial to Anderson and her husband at the Andersons Bay Cemetery, where their children are buried. Anderson and her husband however are buried elsewhere.
