= South Dunedin =

Suburb of Dunedin, New Zealand

- Suburb
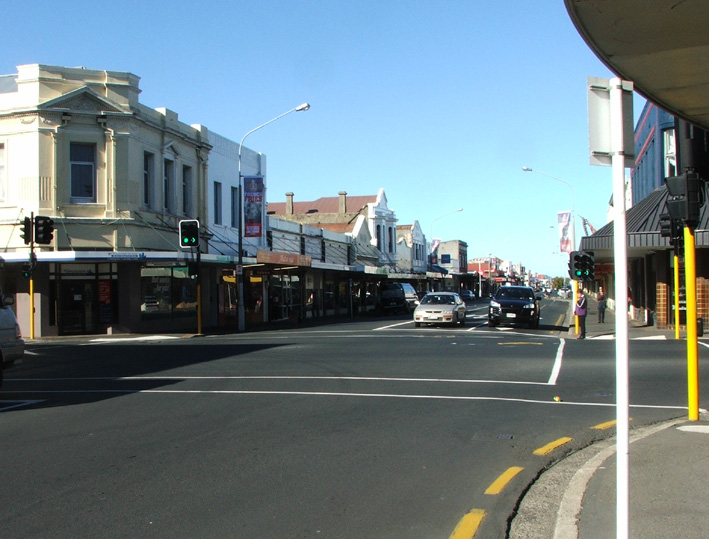
- King Edward Street, looking south from Cargill's Corner
- Interactive map of South Dunedin
- Coordinates: 45.8950°S 170.5012°E
- Country: New Zealand
- City: Dunedin
- Established: 1876

Area
  - Land: 189 ha (470 acres)

Population (June 2025)
  - Total: 2,610
  - Density: 1,380/km^{2} (3,580/sq mi)

Mornington	Central Dunedin	Dunedin Harbourside
Caversham	South Dunedin	(Otago Harbour)
Forbury	St Kilda	Musselburgh

South Dunedin is a major inner city suburb of the New Zealand city of Dunedin. It is located, as its name suggests, 2.5 kilometres (1.6 mi) to the south of the city centre, on part of a large plain known simply as "The Flat". The suburb is a mix of industrial, retail, and predominantly lower-quality residential properties.

The term South Dunedin is often used in a more general sense to refer to any or all of the various suburbs occupying The Flat, including St Kilda, Forbury, Kensington, Musselburgh, and Tahuna.

== Geography ==
The flat land which makes up much of Dunedin's heart is enclosed to the south and east by Otago Harbour and to the north and west by a ridge of hills. At the southern end of central Dunedin, these hills form a ridge that (prior to reclamation) came close to the line of the harbour. To the south of this lies a broad plain, initially swampy but now drained and expanded by reclamation. This plain is the site of South Dunedin.

The boundaries of South Dunedin are vaguely defined. Though the area was a separate borough briefly in the late nineteenth century, the borders which delimited that borough are no longer widely used as descriptors for South Dunedin. One major exception is South Dunedin's boundary with St Kilda, which was a separate borough until far more recently. The line of Bay View Road is still seen as a border between South Dunedin and St Kilda. This notion is enhanced by the change of name of one of the suburbs' main arterial roads at this boundary, with King Edward Street becoming Prince Albert Road as it passes into St Kilda.

To the east, South Dunedin's natural limit is Otago Harbour, and to the north a ridge of hills also forms a topographical boundary. At the foot of this ridge, however, lies the small suburb of Kensington and parts of the much larger borough of Caversham. Caversham also marks a limit at the western edge of South Dunedin, though in both cases the exact boundaries are not well-defined.

=== Southern Endowment ===
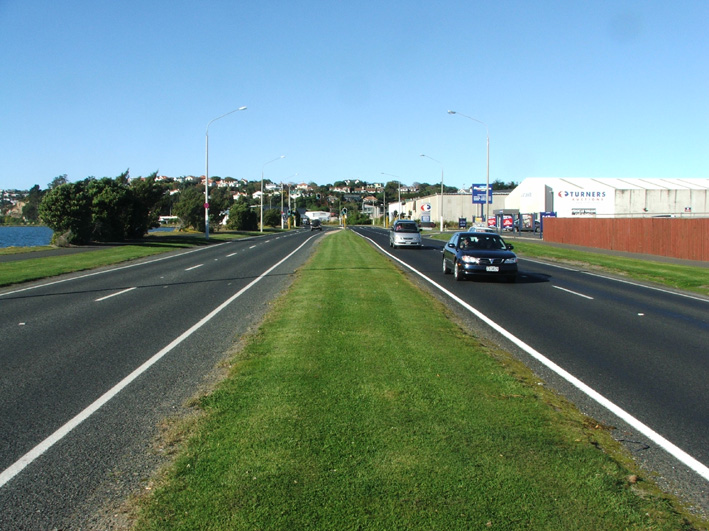
Portsmouth Drive follows the route of the original 1912 causeway along the harbour's edge.

Much of eastern South Dunedin is land reclaimed from Otago Harbour. This area, which lies immediately to the west of the harbour's head, is known as the Southern Endowment, and covers an area of close to 100 hectares (250 acres). The Southern Endowment was begun with rock removed during the cutting of Bell Hill in the central city during the nineteenth century. This largely extended the area around the wharves close to the heart of the city, but did not extend any further south until 1912, when a causeway was built along the head of the harbour. As part of an Otago Harbour Board scheme to reclaim land for industrial use, dredges started to pump tailings into the area behind the causeway in the 1940s. Reclamation continued for many years, and was not officially completed until the opening of Portsmouth Drive, which runs along the route of the 1912 causeway at the harbour edge, in 1978.

Most of the area of the southern endowment is industrial and storage, though it does contain a small park close to the wharf area and the major sports complex of The Edgar Centre close to its southern edge.

=== Flooding issues ===
Much of South Dunedin was built at a time when groundwater was up to 17cm lower than it is now. A 2016 report by Parliamentary Commissioner for the Environment Jan Wright identified South Dunedin as the single biggest community in New Zealand exposed to sea level rise, with 2700 houses identified as within 25cm of the mean high tide mark, some of which are already below sea level.

Currently, more than half of buildings in South Dunedin are at risk of surface flooding, and this is expected to increase to almost 70 percent by the year 2100. While residents have expressed concern that the flooding is caused by malfunctioning pipes and pumping stations, the Dunedin City Council have attributed the issue to high groundwater levels.

Proposed plans to lower the groundwater level include restoring the former Forbury Park Raceway, 1.5 kilometres (0.93 mi) to the southwest, to its original state as a wetland.

=== Cargill's Corner ===
South Dunedin contains the city's second most important retail district, centred on Cargill's Corner, named for Otago provincial founder Captain William Cargill (Hillside Road—at one time called Cargill Road—is named for his house, "Hillside", which lay some 0.5 kilometres (0.31 mi) to the north). At this junction, two main suburban arterial routes—King Edward Street and Hillside Road—cross. A small shopping mall, South City, is located at Cargill's Corner.

Cargill's Corner had, for many years, Dunedin's only "Barnes Dance" pedestrian crossing. Its use was stopped during the 1980s. In 2011, Dunedin City Council considered reintroducing Barnes Dance control at Cargill's Corner as part of other improvements, but the work has since been completed without the change in traffic control.

King Edward Street is aligned roughly north-south, linking with the southern end of Princes Street, and linking the centre city in the north with the densely populated coastal suburb of St Kilda. Hillside Road links Andersons Bay Road, a further major suburban arterial, in the east with the suburbs of Caversham, Corstorphine and Saint Clair in the west and southwest.

=== Main roads ===
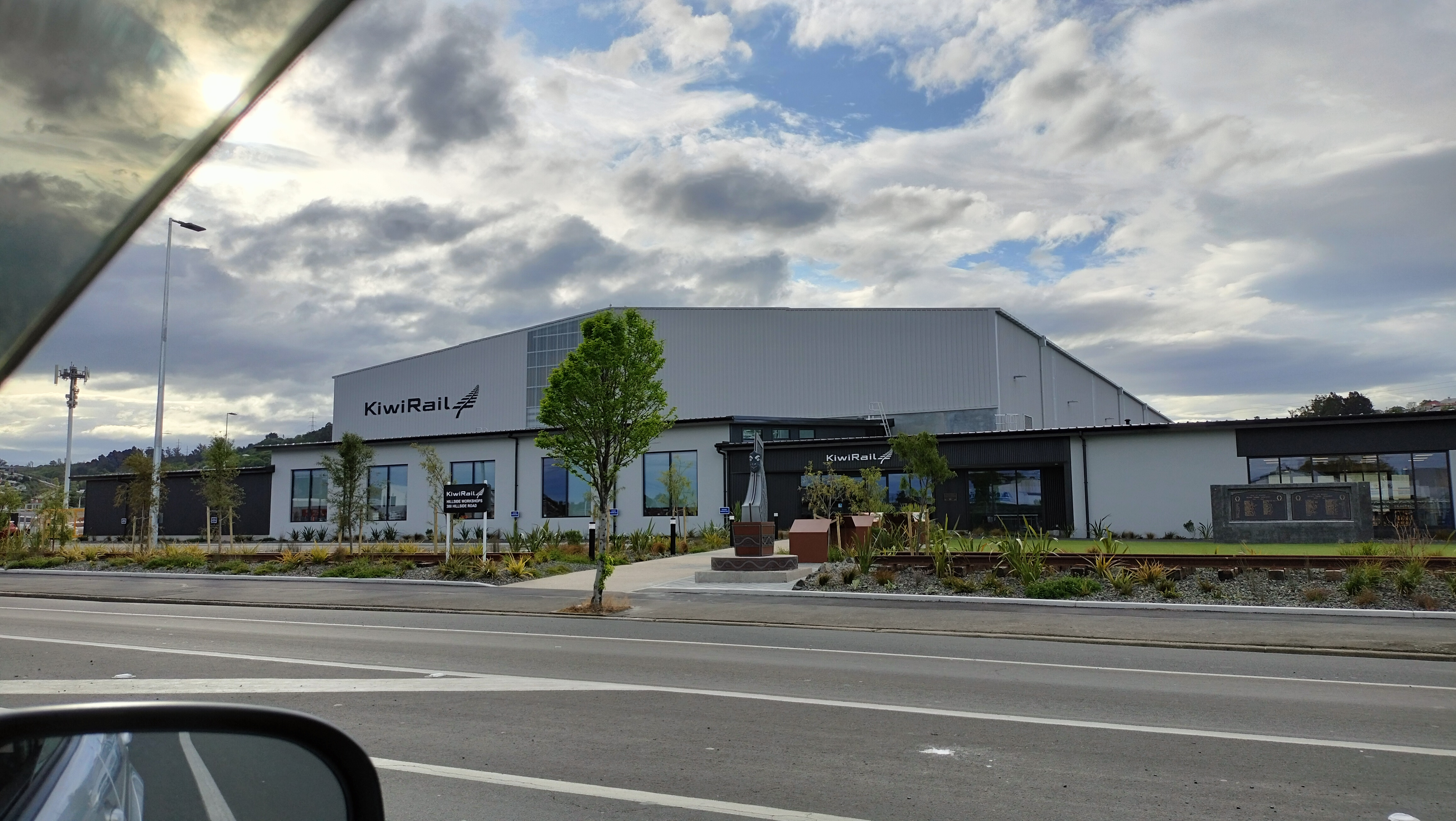
The Hillside Workshops covers a large area of Hillside Road, South Dunedin.

Smaller, older shops stretch south along King Edward Street and west along Hillside Road from Cargill's Corner. To the east, along Hillside Road and Anderson's Bay Road are larger supermarkets and wholesalers, notably Pak'nSave, The Warehouse, Woolworths, and Mitre 10 Mega. Further along Anderson's Bay Road to the south and to the west on Hillside Road are numerous car sale yards and light industrial works. These extend into Caversham in the west, and across the reclaimed land which lies between Andersons Bay Road and Portsmouth Drive in the south and east. At its southern extreme, King Edward Street becomes increasingly residential, though there are also light industrial premises here.

Andersons Bay Road lies roughly parallel with King Edward Street some 0.5 kilometres (0.31 mi) to the east. This route, which roughly follows the original shoreline, connects with State Highway 1 and Dunedin's one-way street system in the north, and with the suburb of Musselburgh in the south. It also provides a major route from the centre city with Otago Peninsula.

Portsmouth Drive, a further arterial route, lies a further 0.6 kilometres (0.37 mi) to the east along the edge of Otago Harbour, at the edge of the reclaimed Southern Endowment. This route links the centre city with Portobello Road, the long, twisting route which travels the length of Otago Peninsula's harbour coast. It is named for Dunedin's American sister city of Portsmouth, Virginia.

Other important roads in South Dunedin include Timaru Street on the Southern Endowment, and several streets which cross or meet King Edward Street, linking it with Anderson's Bay Road in the east or the suburbs of Saint Clair and Forbury in the west. These include Macandrew Road, Melbourne Street, McBride Street, and Bay View Road, the latter of which forms the boundary between South Dunedin and St Kilda.

== History ==
=== Geological history ===
The South Dunedin plain was first formed about 18,000 years ago during the Last Glacial Period. At the time, the sea level was about 120 metres lower than today and the coastline stretched out as much as 35 km offshore further from its present extant. Following the Last Glacial Period, sea levels rose, reaching their present level about 7,000 years ago. The Otago Harbour was a former stream valley that was flooded during this period. During the post-glacial sea level rise, the South Dunedin plain was covered in ocean. A dune barrier was later formed between St Clair and Lawyers Head through the flow of fine sediment from the Clutha River and other smaller catchments. After the barrier formed, fine sediment accumulated in the waters at the head of the Otago Harbour, causing the sea in that area to became increasingly shallow. The gradual sediment accumulation led to the formation of a coastal wetland known as the South Dunedin plain, which also became a land bridge between the mainland South Island and the Otago Peninsula.

=== 19th century ===
Prior to European settlement, much of South Dunedin was covered by salt marshes, wetlands and lagoons. Local Māori people referred to this area as Kaituna (which translates as "eating eels") due to the abundance of eels. A shallow lagoon also terminated through the salt dunes near St Clair. This flat coastal area functioned as a drainage basin for the hilly, catchment area that formed the rest of Dunedin. European settlers referred to this area as "The Flat." As the city's population expanded during the Otago gold rush, European settlers began reclaiming swampy land in "The Flat." The land was filled using sand from the coastal dunes of St Kilda. Consequently, much of South Dunedin was built on land consisting of soft, sandy sediment that was only slightly above the water table (which was up to 17 cm lower than the present day).

Early settlement of the area took place along the hill fringes at Caversham and St. Clair. The arrival at St Clair of William Henry Valpy (1793–1852) in 1849 led to the first development of permanent roading in the area; Valpy, reputedly the wealthiest man in New Zealand, had a branch dray road built from Dunedin's central settlement to his St. Clair farm which ran along the edge of what is now South Dunedin. With the rapid expansion of the city at the time of the Otago gold rush of the 1860s, settlement expended, notably around what is now Hillside Road.

Chinese settlers were notable among early residents in the St Clair area, and largely through their effort the swampy land inland from the beach was drained and converted into market gardens. Much of the young city's vegetable production was centred on Chinese allotments in an area close to what is now Macandrew Road, Forbury, and there were further allotments in both Andersons Bay and Tainui. The opening of a quarry in the Forbury area (which provided building materials for the young city) also increased the impetus towards development of the southern end of the city. South Dunedin became a borough in 1876.

During the late 19th century, marram grass was planted and sand-catching structures were also built along Ocean Beach, creating high sand dunes south of present-day Victoria Road that runs across St Kilda and St Clair. To accommodate the expansion of housing in South Dunedin, drainage of the wet lands through the dunes was blocked off to prevent storm tides from coming in through these dunes.

=== 20th century ===
By 1905, South Dunedin had become a thriving industrial and residential suburb.

"The Forbury public school, St. Patrick Catholic school, and a convent and orphanage are situated in the borough, which contains, also, the Dunedin City Corporation gasworks, a rope and twine factory, a fruit preserving factory, a box factory, and furniture workshops. There are Presbyterian, Wesleyan, Baptist, and Roman Catholic churches, and Salvation Army barracks; and members of the Church of Christ hold services in the Town Hall. The Borough Council has an endowment of 155 acres on the harbour front, which is leased, in small sections, to ratepayers who desire to build in that quarter. The Town Hall was built in 1902, at a cost of £2,118, and contains a spacious council-room, offices, and strong room. The hall is much used for lectures, dances, and other forms of entertainment, and is centrally situated on the Hillside road, the main business thoroughfare of the borough. There are four licensed hotels in the district, also a volunteer Fire Brigade and station, maintained at a cost of about £60 a year. The streets are well formed, and lighted with twenty-five gas lamps, and the footpaths are asphalted and kept in good order."

The South Dunedin borough amalgamated with Dunedin City in 1905, a year after its neighbour Caversham.

During the 1923 New Zealand Storm, South Dunedin along with Caversham and St Kilda experienced heavy rain and extensive flooding.

During the 1960s and 1970s, further land reclamation occurred between Andersons Bay Road and Portsmouth Drive through the use of dredging spoil excavated from Otago Harbour. This reclaimed land was used predominantly for commercial activity and including a pumping station on Portobello Road.

As part of the Fourth Labour Government's local government reforms, the St Kilda Borough Council was merged into the newly formed Dunedin City Council in November 1989.

=== 21st century ===
View across "The Flat" from the north, showing much of South Dunedin and St Kilda. The Dunedin Southern Motorway and Hillside Workshops can be seen left and centre foreground; Bathgate Park is visible extreme right.

In June 2015, South Dunedin experienced heavy flooding after a low weather system brought heavy rain to the coastal Otago region. Flood damage was exacerbated by the area's high water table and the breakdown of the Portobello pumping station. 1,200 homes and businesses were damaged by flood damage, with total flood damage reaching $138,000,000. This flood was caused by land reclamation, human settlement, roads and buildings disrupting the natural flood basin by preventing water from seeping into the ground.

In early October 2024, parts of South Dunedin experienced heavy rainfall and flooding during the 2024 Otago floods. 100 residents in Caversham and Forbury were forced to evacuate due to flooding. A state of emergency was also declared in Dunedin on 3 October. In late January 2025, Mayor of Dunedin Jules Radich release a proposed NZ$44 million plan to mitigate future flooding in South Dunedin. This plan involved diverting the Bay View Road and New Street stormwater systems to a new pipe connected to the Portobello pumping station (NZ$1.9m), upgrading the Forbury Road pipe ($12m), and disconnecting the Hillside Road mains and pumping to the Orari Street outfall (NZ$15.2m). The draft 2025 budget also included allocating NZ$15 million for future medium-term flood alleviation work in South Dunedin. Dunedin City councillors voted by a margin of 13 to 1 to approve the plan.

In mid-June 2026, the South Dunedin Future Initiative (a joint initiative of the Dunedin City Council and the Otago Regional Council) released three future plans for South Dunedin; which included raising land and pumping water (NZ$2.1 billion), creating wetlands and canals ($1.63 billion), and raising land and using infrastructure to move out of harm's way ($2.45 billion). While the South Dunedin Future Initiative ruled out a large-scale managed retreat, they estimated that 1,700 properties would need to be acquired to carry out infrastructure upgrades, land raising or new green spaces. If a planned seawall did not cover the Andersons Bay Inlet, Bayfield High School would need to be relocated. Dunedin City Councillor Jo Galer criticised local authorities for not consulting affected residents before releasing the plans.

=== Mayors of South Dunedin Borough ===
The following is a complete list of the mayors of South Dunedin Borough, from its inception in 1876, until its merger with Dunedin City in 1905:

	Name	Term
1	Nicholas Moloney	1876–1877
2	Gabriel Hodges	1877–1879
(1)	Nicholas Maloney	1879–1880
3	George McBride	1880–1882
4	Joseph Osmond	1882–1883
5	William Wardrop	1883–1887
6	Michael Sullivan	1887–1890
(5)	William Wardrop	1890–1892
7	Henry Henderson	1892–1893
8	Ephraim Osborne	1893–1894
(5)	William Wardrop	1894–1895
9	Charlie Fisher	1895–1898
10	Thomas Fiddis	1898–1901
11	Andrew Todd	1901–1902
12	John Chetwin	1902–1904
13	John Shacklock	1904–1905

== Demographics ==
South Dunedin comprises two statistical areas: Hillside-Portsmouth Drive, which contains the industrial and warehousing areas; and Bathgate Park, which contains the residential and commercial areas.

=== Hillside-Portsmouth Drive ===
Hillside-Portsmouth Drive covers 1.36 km^{2} (0.53 sq mi) and had an estimated population of 90 as of June 2025, with a population density of 66 people per km^{2}.

Historical population for Hillside-Portsmouth Drive
Year	Pop.	±% p.a.
2006	105	—
2013	75	−4.69%
2018	99	+5.71%

Hillside-Portsmouth Drive had a population of 99 at the 2018 New Zealand census, an increase of 24 people (32.0%) since the 2013 census, and a decrease of 6 people (−5.7%) since the 2006 census. There were 45 households, comprising 66 males and 33 females, giving a sex ratio of 2.0 males per female. The median age was 38.8 years (compared with 37.4 years nationally), with 9 people (9.1%) aged under 15 years, 27 (27.3%) aged 15 to 29, 51 (51.5%) aged 30 to 64, and 15 (15.2%) aged 65 or older.

Ethnicities were 66.7% European/Pākehā, 15.2% Māori, 9.1% Pasifika, 18.2% Asian, and 3.0% other ethnicities. People may identify with more than one ethnicity.

The percentage of people born overseas was 27.3, compared with 27.1% nationally.

Although some people chose not to answer the census's question about religious affiliation, 60.6% had no religion, 24.2% were Christian, 6.1% were Hindu, 6.1% were Muslim and 3.0% had other religions.

Of those at least 15 years old, 6 (6.7%) people had a bachelor's or higher degree, and 21 (23.3%) people had no formal qualifications. The median income was $22,600, compared with $31,800 nationally. 3 people (3.3%) earned over $70,000 compared to 17.2% nationally. The employment status of those at least 15 was that 42 (46.7%) people were employed full-time, 12 (13.3%) were part-time, and 9 (10.0%) were unemployed.

=== Bathgate Park ===
Bathgate Park statistical area, which was renamed South Dunedin for the 2023 Census, covers 0.53 km^{2} (0.20 sq mi) and had an estimated population of 2,520 as of June 2025, with a population density of 4,755 people per km^{2}.

Historical population for Bathgrate Park
Year	Pop.	±% p.a.
2006	2,358	—
2013	2,310	−0.29%
2018	2,439	+1.09%

Bathgate Park had a population of 2,439 at the 2018 New Zealand census, an increase of 129 people (5.6%) since the 2013 census, and an increase of 81 people (3.4%) since the 2006 census. There were 1,233 households, comprising 1,119 males and 1,317 females, giving a sex ratio of 0.85 males per female. The median age was 49.0 years (compared with 37.4 years nationally), with 324 people (13.3%) aged under 15 years, 405 (16.6%) aged 15 to 29, 1,032 (42.3%) aged 30 to 64, and 678 (27.8%) aged 65 or older.

Ethnicities were 78.8% European/Pākehā, 12.8% Māori, 6.6% Pasifika, 8.7% Asian, and 2.2% other ethnicities. People may identify with more than one ethnicity.

The percentage of people born overseas was 17.5, compared with 27.1% nationally.

Although some people chose not to answer the census's question about religious affiliation, 47.2% had no religion, 38.5% were Christian, 0.7% had Māori religious beliefs, 1.4% were Hindu, 0.7% were Muslim, 0.9% were Buddhist and 2.8% had other religions.

Of those at least 15 years old, 237 (11.2%) people had a bachelor's or higher degree, and 705 (33.3%) people had no formal qualifications. The median income was $21,400, compared with $31,800 nationally. 69 people (3.3%) earned over $70,000 compared to 17.2% nationally. The employment status of those at least 15 was that 687 (32.5%) people were employed full-time, 270 (12.8%) were part-time, and 90 (4.3%) were unemployed.

== Landmarks ==
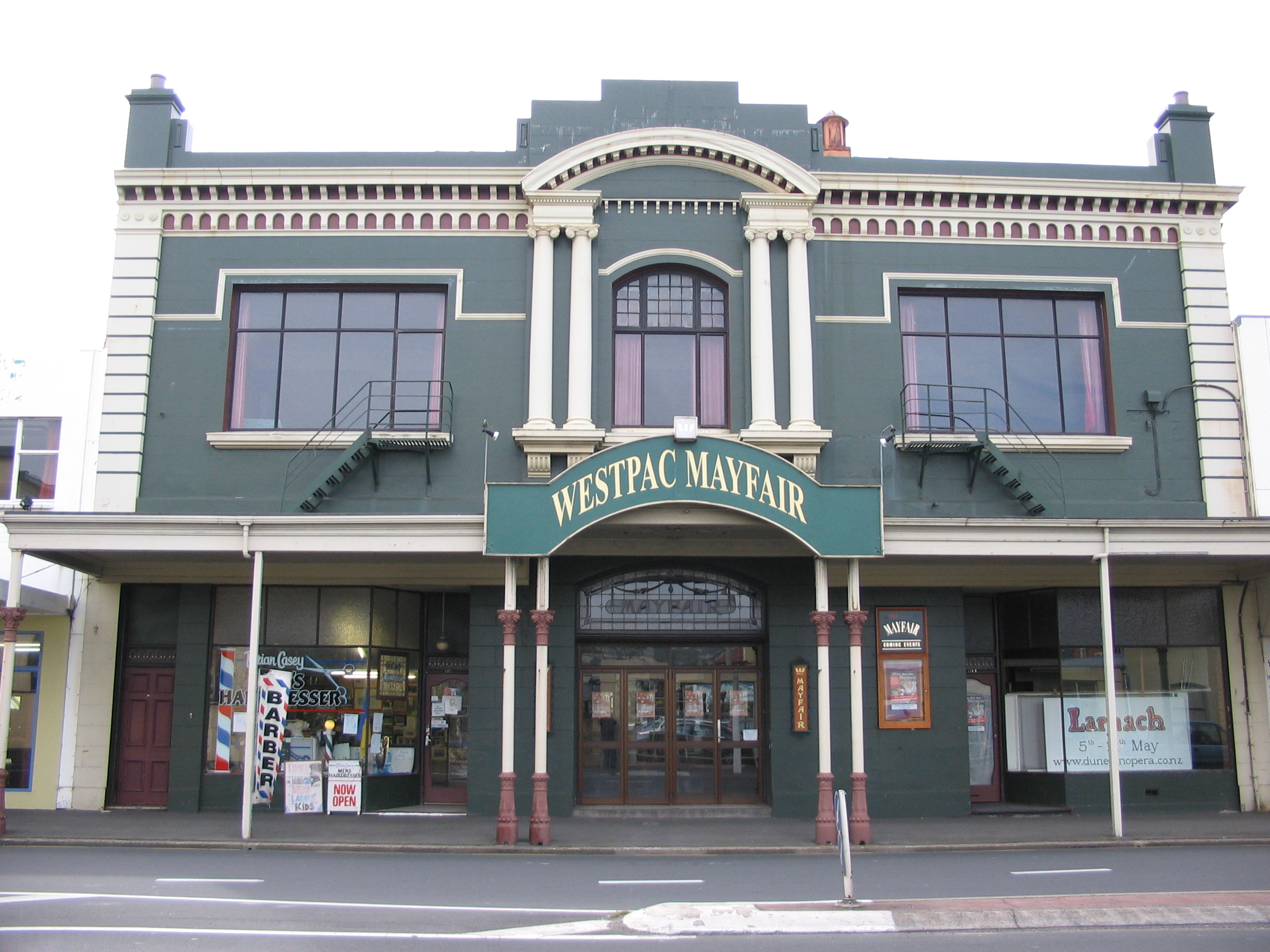
The Mayfair Theatre, King Edward Street

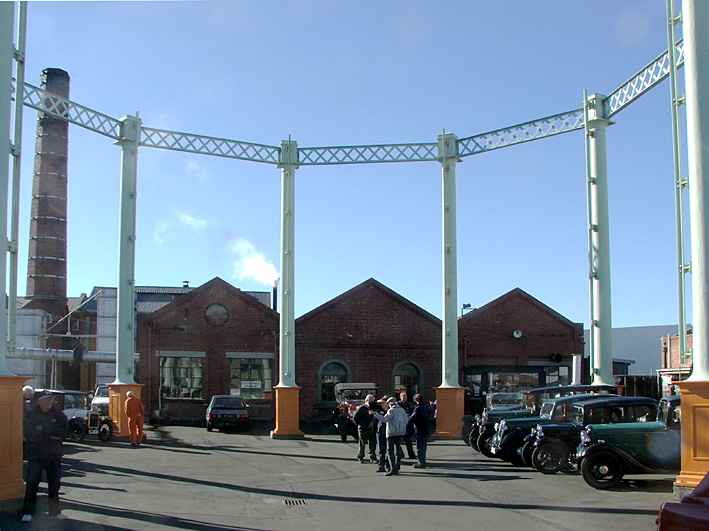
Dunedin Gasworks Museum

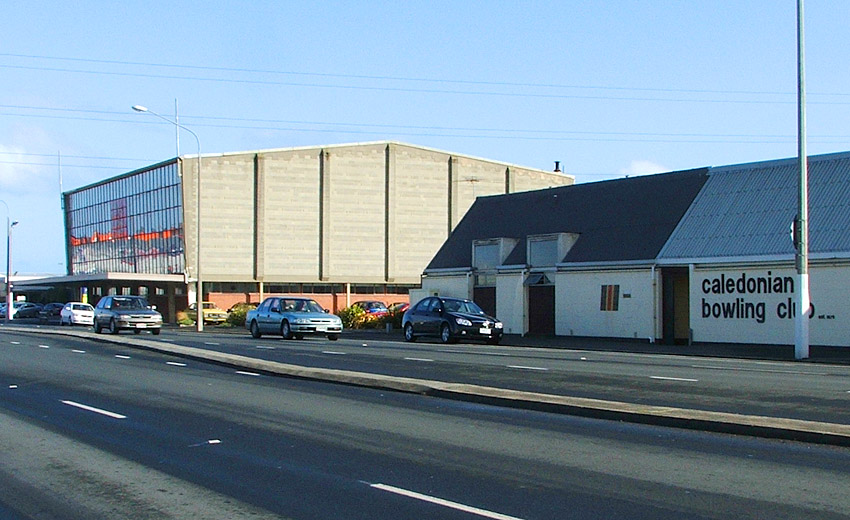
The gymnasium (left) is all that remain of the former Caledonian Ground after the local bowls club (right) was bulldozed in 2015.

The industrial heart of South Dunedin is the Hillside Railway Workshops, located immediately to the west of Cargills Corner. These workshops cover some 8 hectares (20 acres) and stretch into the neighbouring suburb of Caversham. Large industrial structures that were part of the workshops were a major feature of Hillside Road until they were gradually replaced in the 2010s and 2020s by more modern buildings.

Other notable buildings in South Dunedin include the Mayfair Theatre, close to Cargill's Corner, and the Edgar Sports Centre, at the southeastern extremity of the suburb on Portsmouth Drive. The Mayfair Theatre has a New Zealand Historic Places Trust (NZHPT) Category II classification

The corner of Hillside Road and Andersons Bay Road is the former site of the country's longest-serving gasworks, which operated from 1863 to 1987. A small industrial museum, the Dunedin Gasworks Museum, is located on the southern part of its site on Braemar Street. Opened to the public in 2001, this museum is one of only three known preserved gasworks museums in the world. The museum features five steam pumping engines which were used in the gasworks, and an older engine imported from Scotland in 1868. Three of the buildings within the Gasworks complex have NZHPT classifications: the skeleton of the 1879 gasometer, the exhauster and boiler house, and the fitting shop (all Category I).

There are several notable churches in South Dunedin, among them two further NZHPT listings — the city's only Eastern Orthodox church, St. Michael's Antiochian Orthodox Church, in Fingall Street, and St. Patrick's Roman Catholic Basilica (designed by Francis Petre) in Macandrew Road (Category II).

=== Former landmarks ===
Other than the Hillside workshops and the gasworks, South Dunedin has several links with Dunedin's industrial heritage. Notable among these was the factory of G. Methven, one of New Zealand's leading bathroom fittings manufacturers. This company, founded by George Methven, was located for many years in Andersons Bay Road on a site now occupied by a Mitre 10 megastore. On the opposite side of Andersons Bay Road from this is the former location of one of the city's girls' secondary schools, Moreau College, which amalgamated with St. Paul's High School for boys in 1989 to become Kavanagh College. The Moreau site was disestablished, with the new school continuing on the St Paul's site in City Rise.

The city's former main sports complex, Carisbrook, a host site for international cricket and rugby matches, was located close to the edge of South Dunedin in Caversham. It was replaced by the Forsyth Barr Stadium in the north of the city in 2011 and demolished over the following few years. The site is now a small industrial park.

Another former stadium, the Caledonian Ground, stood on ground between King Edward Street and Andersons Bay Road. It was relocated in 2000 to Logan Park in Dunedin North. The former Caledonian sports ground was located opposite the gasworks at the corner of Hillside Road and Andersons Bay Road, a site still known as Caledonian Corner. The sports field was relocated to Dunedin North, and the site is now the car park of The Warehouse – all that remains of the original sports complex is the gymnasium, which is also South Dunedin's main war memorial (Hillside Workshops have their own separate memorial by the site's main gate). The Caledonian was the site of the first human ascent in a hot-air balloon in New Zealand — and first parachute descent — performed by travelling showman Thomas Scott Baldwin on 21 January 1889.

== Bibliography ==
- Croot, Charles (1999) Dunedin Churches Past and Present. Dunedin: Otago Settlers' Association.
- Goldsmith, Michael; Hornblow, Sharon (July 2016). The Natural Hazards of South Dunedin (PDF) (Report). Otago Regional Council. pp. 1–77. Archived from the original (PDF) on 3 October 2023.
- Hamel, Antony, (2008) Dunedin Tracks and Trails. Dunedin: Silver Peaks Press. ISBN 978-0-473-13772-4
- Herd, Joyce, and Griffiths, George J., (1980) Discovering Dunedin. Dunedin: John McIndoe. ISBN 0-86868-030-3
- Newton, Barbara A., (2003) Our St. Clair: A resident's history. Dunedin: Kenmore Productions.
- Reed, A. W. (1975). Place names of New Zealand. Wellington: A. H. & A. W. Reed. ISBN 0-589-00933-8.
