= Mornington School =

Location
- 34 Elgin Road; Dunedin, Otago; New Zealand
- Coordinates: 45.882506°S 170.475514°E

Information
- Type: State primary school
- Motto: Noho Tahi Ako Tahi; Together We Live & Learn
- Established: 1865; 161 years ago
- Ministry of Education Institution no.: 3776
- Principal: Carmel Jolly
- Gender: Co-educational
- Enrollment: 239 (2025)
- Socio-economic decile: 7
- Website: www.mornington.school.nz

Mornington School is a state-funded, co-educational primary school located in Mornington, a suburb of Dunedin, New Zealand. Established in 1865, it is one of the older primary schools in the city and serves students from Years 1 to 6.

== History ==
Mornington School was founded in 1865. Most of its current classroom buildings date from the early 1970s, when distinctive hexagonal classroom buildings were constructed as part of a redesign by the architectural firm McAllum & Black. The original school hall remains part of the campus.

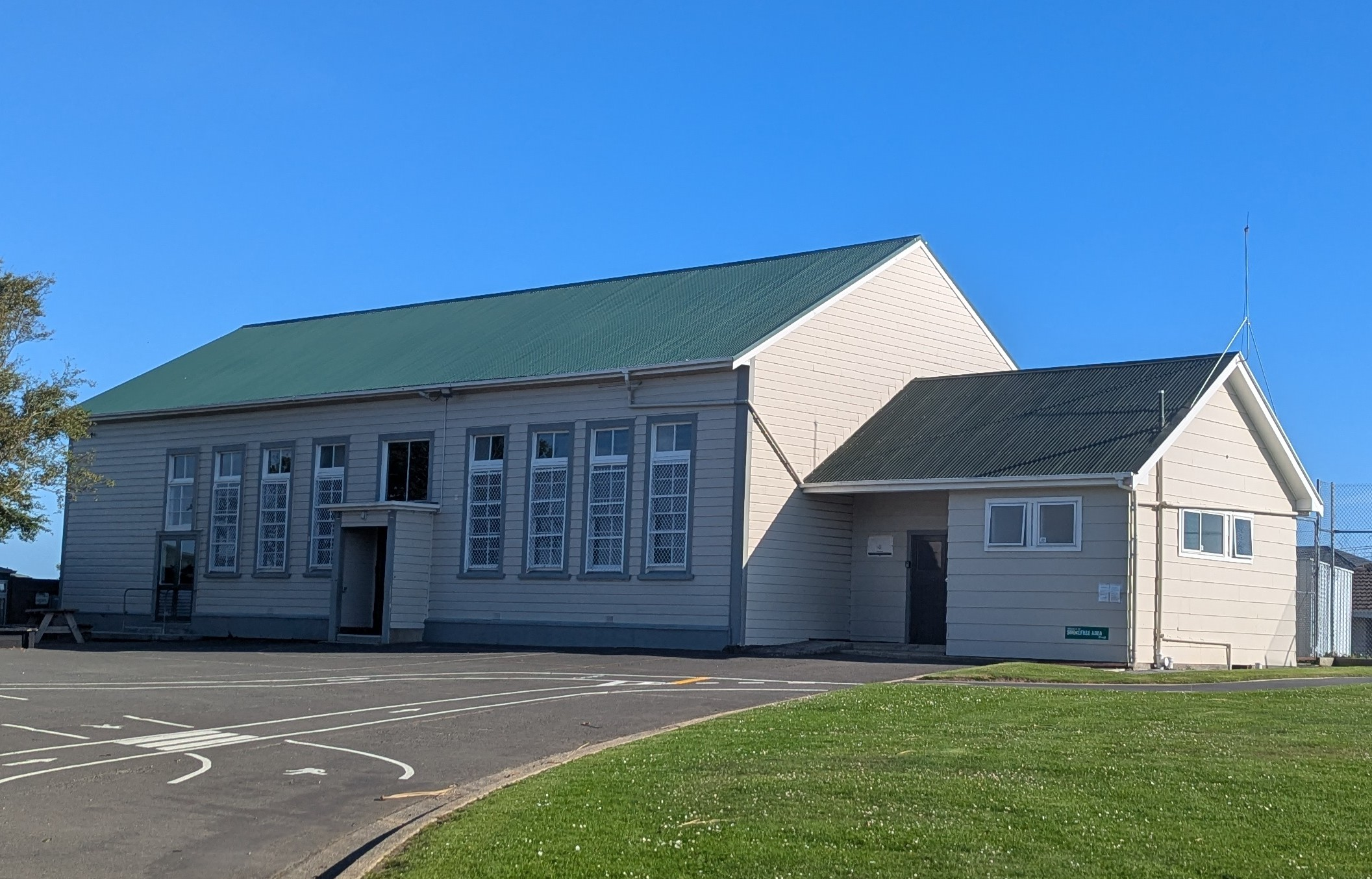
Mornington School hall

In 2015, Mornington School celebrated its 150th jubilee with a ten-day programme of events, including a birthday party, a human domino chain, a pool party, a disco, and an assembly for former pupils. Former pupils, including 93-year-old Connie Nelson, returned and remarked on the familiarity of the original school hall, the only building remaining from their time at the school. The celebrations were attended by more than 320 people, including current and former students and local dignitaries.

The school’s historic fife and drum band, active from the late 19th century into the mid‑20th century, was featured in local media after historic instruments were loaned back to the school around the time of its sesquicentennial events.

In March 2024, a 102‑year‑old former pupil returned to the school to drop off her great‑granddaughter on the first day of term, illustrating multi‑generational links between families and the school.

== Campus and facilities ==
The school campus includes distinctive hexagonal classroom buildings designed to maximise natural light and open learning spaces. Facilities include a library, a historic hall, a swimming pool, and multiple playground areas.

== See also ==
- List of schools in Otago
- Mornington, Dunedin
