= City Rise =

Suburb of Dunedin, New Zealand

- Suburb
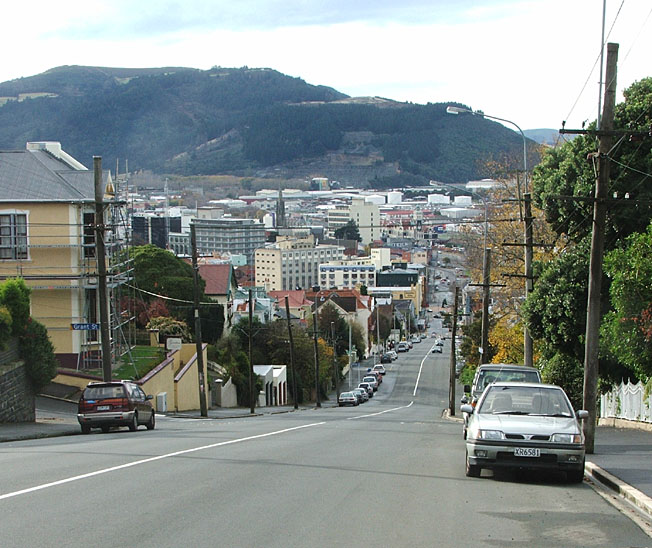
- Looking down High Street towards the central city, with Signal Hill visible in the background
- Interactive map of City Rise
- Coordinates: 45.8758°S 170.4937°E
- Country: New Zealand
- City: Dunedin
- Local authority: Dunedin City Council

Area
  - Land: 292 ha (720 acres)

Population (June 2025)
  - Total: 7,630
  - Density: 2,610/km^{2} (6,770/sq mi)

	Roslyn	Dunedin North
Brockville	City Rise	Central Dunedin
Kaikorai Valley	Mornington	South Dunedin

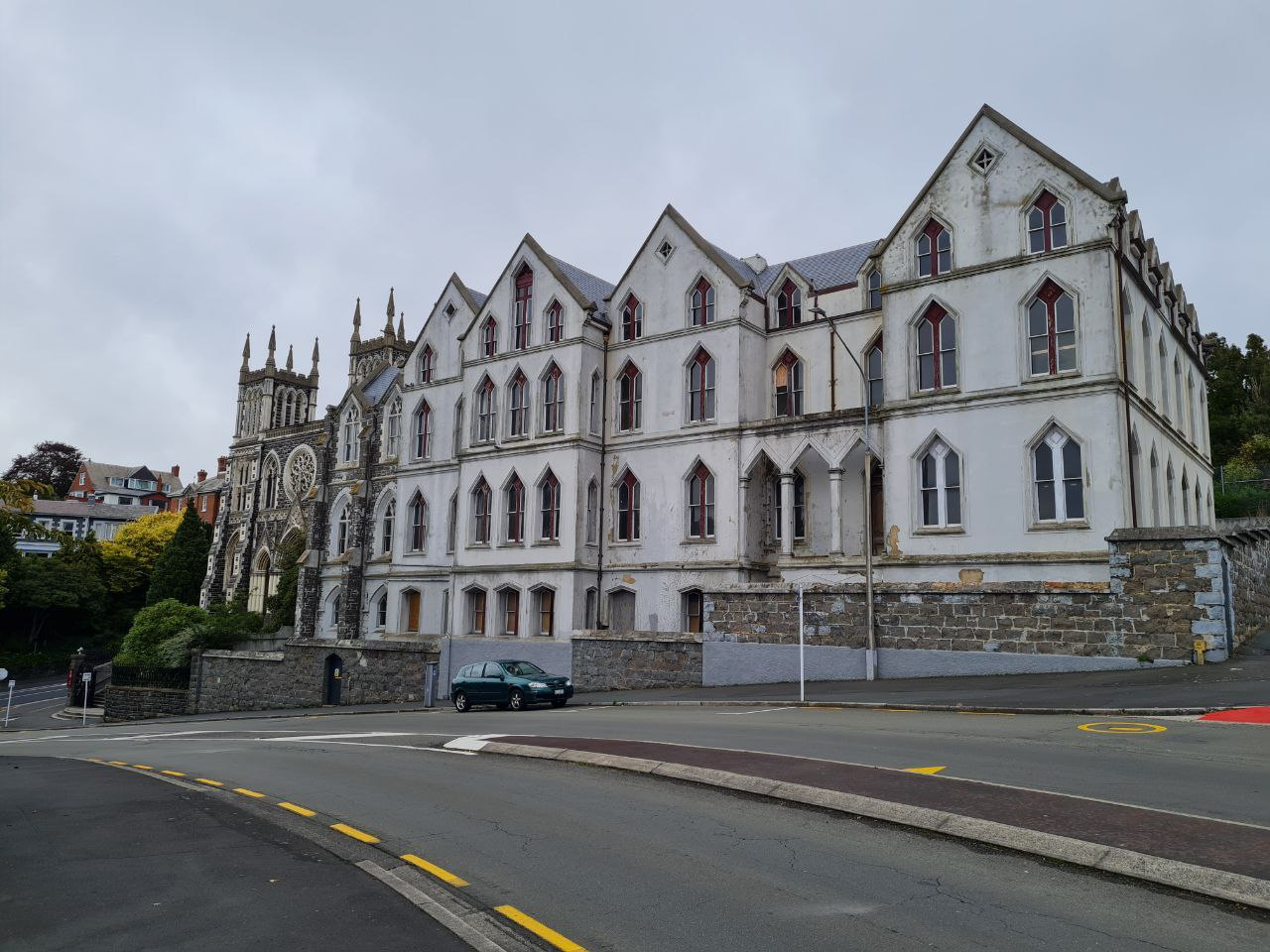
(right to left) St Dominic's Priory, St Joseph's Cathedral and the Bishop's Palace March 2023

City Rise is an inner suburb of the New Zealand city of Dunedin. One of the city's older suburbs, it is, as its name suggests, centred on the slopes which lie close to the city centre, particularly those closest to the city's original heart of The Exchange (for this reason, places are said to be on the City Rise rather than in City Rise). Extensive views across the central city can be gained from much of City Rise.

The name City Rise is generally applied to the area immediately to the west of Princes Street, especially to the approximately triangular area of one square kilometre bounded by Princes Street and the city's Town Belt, with Maitland Street and Stuart Street lying at the edge of the area. Some parts of the lower slopes at one time carried the name Fernhill, a term still occasionally encountered to refer to this area, arising from the name of the residence of an early settler, Captain Bellairs. Other notable streets on the City Rise include High Street, Rattray Street, Stafford Street, Arthur Street, Canongate, and Serpentine Avenue. The name City Rise is sometime used to cover a wider area extending further to the north along the inner edge of the Town Belt from Stuart Street and Moana Pool as far as the stately house Olveston and to the top of Pitt Street.

City Rise contains many of the city's earliest grand residences, notably along High Street and streets close to it. Many of these buildings were built on money which flowed into the infant city at the time of the Otago gold rush of 1861–1862. Notable houses include Threave (designed by Robert Lawson), Moata, and Colquhouns, among many others.

The suburb is bounded by the central city to the east and northeast, by Kensington to the south, and Mornington to the west. The small suburb of Belleknowes lies immediately to the north, beyond which is Roslyn.

The suburb has a concentration of buildings associated with the Catholic church centred on St Joseph's Cathedral (the Catholic Precinct) and sometimes called informally the "Southern Vatican".

The suburb has strong links with the city's education. Otago Boys' High School lies close to Stuart Street in the north of City Rise, and the original site of Otago Polytechnic (or, as it was at the time, King Edward Technical College) is also on the city rise side of Stuart Street. Trinity Catholic College lies across Rattray and Tennyson streets. Otago Girls' High School is located closer to the city centre at the edge of City Rise. Arthur Street School is also located in the suburb, close to Otago Boys' High School. Next to Arthur Street School's grounds is a monument on what was the site of Dunedin's first cemetery, Arthur Street Cemetery.

There is very little industry centred on City Rise, the most notable exception being Speight's Brewery, which is located at the foot of the rise close to the exchange. Immediately above this is Otago Girls' High School and higher is St Joseph's Cathedral (1886) and St Dominics Priory (1878). Notable historical industrial connections with the suburb include Choie (Charles) Sew Hoy's importing company and the Kempthorne Prosser chemical manufacturing company, both of which had their main offices on Stafford Street.

From the 1880s until the 1950s, City Rise was served by Dunedin's cable tramway, with lines running up from the Exchange to the hill suburbs of Mornington and Roslyn via Stuart Street and Rattray Street. The tramway was notable for being only the second of its type in the world (after the San Francisco cable car system).

== Catholic precinct ==
On Rattray Street and stretching across Tennyson St is Trinity Catholic College which is part of a Catholic precinct which includes St Joseph's Cathedral (1886) and St Dominics Priory (1878). The priory was the mother house of a large congregation of Dominican nuns. This Catholic presence dated from 1862 when an earlier church and presbytery and St Joseph's School, now St Joseph's Cathedral School, a primary school, were built. St Joseph's Hall, between Rattray St and Bishop's Place, opened in 1899. Above Rattray St and opposite the cathedral is the former Bishops Palace and a large building which formerly housed the Christian Brothers who staffed St Pauls High School. The original site of St Joseph's Cathedral School was also in Rattery St. The Catholic precinct has been unofficially designated the "Southern Vatican" "It would be difficult to find such a concentration of buildings of one religious denomination in any other New Zealand town." "From the corner of Rattray and Smith Sts, the impressive stone frontage of St Joseph's Catholic Cathedral has gazed patronisingly down on this southern seat of Presbyterianism, this New Edinburgh".

== Belleknowes ==
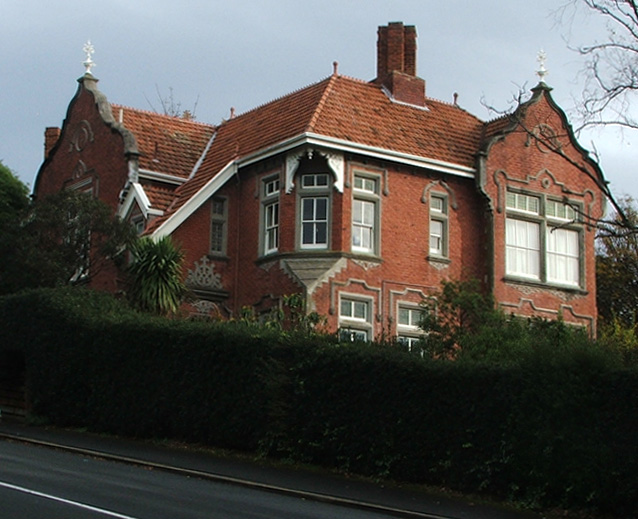
City Rise is notable for its grand townhouses, many of them dating to the late 19th century.

Belleknowes is a smaller suburb, nestled within the Town Belt close to the points where City Rise, Mornington, and Roslyn meet. Its most notable feature is Belleknowes Golf Course, the closest golf course to the centre of Dunedin. A memorial seat dedicated to local historian Robert Gilkison overlooks the golf course with a view across the southern end of Otago Harbour to the suburb of Anderson's Bay. Belleknowes is also the site of the historic housing development the Windle Settlement, 20 houses designed for workers and built in 1906, which is now a registered historic area. Also of note within the suburb are several parks such as Jubilee Park and Robin Hood Park, the latter of which is home to the Beverly-Begg Observatory.

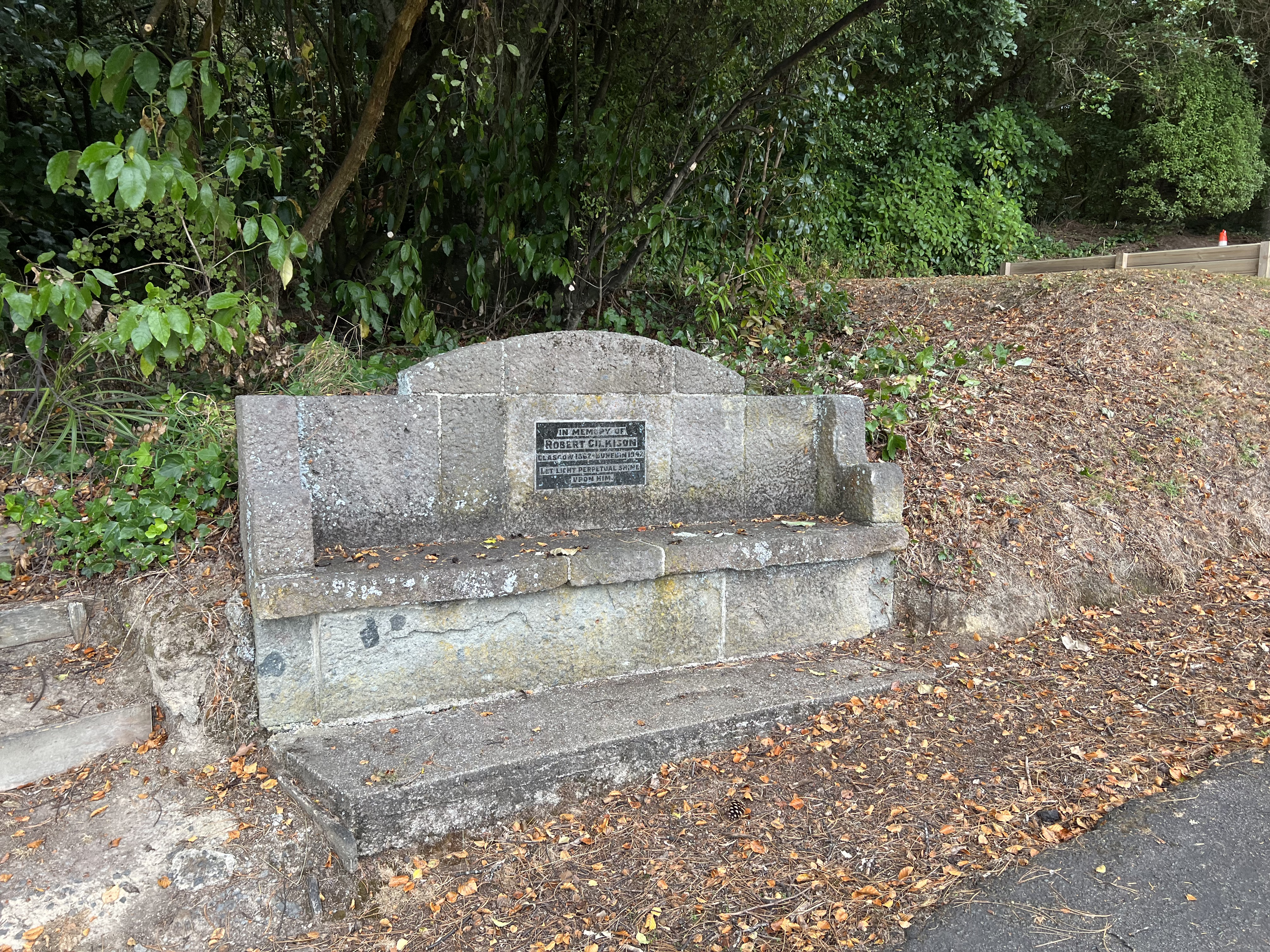
The Robert Gilkison memorial seat, situated on the path between Ross Street and Queens Drive in Belleknowes, overlooking the Belleknowes Golf Course.

== Demographics ==
City Rise covers 2.92 km^{2} (1.13 sq mi) and had an estimated population of 7,630 as of June 2025, with a population density of 2,613 people per km^{2}.

Historical population
Year	Pop.	±% p.a.
2006	6,639	—
2013	6,585	−0.12%
2018	7,041	+1.35%

City Rise had a population of 7,041 at the 2018 New Zealand census, an increase of 456 people (6.9%) since the 2013 census, and an increase of 402 people (6.1%) since the 2006 census. There were 2,652 households, comprising 3,573 males and 3,471 females, giving a sex ratio of 1.03 males per female, with 741 people (10.5%) aged under 15 years, 2,910 (41.3%) aged 15 to 29, 2,634 (37.4%) aged 30 to 64, and 762 (10.8%) aged 65 or older.

Ethnicities were 75.8% European/Pākehā, 8.1% Māori, 3.4% Pasifika, 17.8% Asian, and 4.0% other ethnicities. People may identify with more than one ethnicity.

The percentage of people born overseas was 30.9, compared with 27.1% nationally.

Although some people chose not to answer the census's question about religious affiliation, 54.2% had no religion, 32.1% were Christian, 0.2% had Māori religious beliefs, 2.4% were Hindu, 2.2% were Muslim, 1.4% were Buddhist and 3.1% had other religions.

Of those at least 15 years old, 2,358 (37.4%) people had a bachelor's or higher degree, and 498 (7.9%) people had no formal qualifications. 816 people (13.0%) earned over $70,000 compared to 17.2% nationally. The employment status of those at least 15 was that 2,571 (40.8%) people were employed full-time, 1,185 (18.8%) were part-time, and 390 (6.2%) were unemployed.

Individual statistical areas
Name	Area (km^{2})	Population	Density (per km^{2})	Households	Median age	Median income
Belleknowes	1.13	2,220	1,965	870	41.9 years	$36,800
Royal Terrace	0.28	1,719	6,139	528	22.6 years	$11,600
Arthur Street	0.72	1,494	2,075	582	27.2 years	$21,700
Fernhill	0.79	1,608	2,035	672	33.3 years	$22,400
New Zealand					37.4 years	$31,800

== Education ==
Arthur Street School is a state full primary school serving years 1 to 8 with a roll of 187 students. The school began on board the second immigrant ship, Philip Laing which arrived in Dunedin on 15 April 1848, and became first Beach School and then Middle School before moving to its present site and name in 1877. It was rebuilt in the 1960s.

St Joseph's Cathedral School is a state-integrated Catholic primary school, founded in 1862, serving years 1 to 6 with a roll of 141 students. Since 1990 it has been located at 43 Elm Row.

Trinity Catholic College (formerly known as Kavanagh College) is a state-integrated Catholic secondary school serving years 7 to 13 and is the only Catholic secondary school in Dunedin. It has a roll of 886 students. Trinity was founded in 1989 as the ultimate replacement of four secondary schools and the intermediate classes of a primary school (which closed). The main Trinity College site was occupied by St Paul's High School (for boys), founded in 1876. St Dominic's College (for girls)(1871-1976) occupied another area of the site. In 2011, Trinity Catholic College expanded its site when buildings and a carpark on the opposite side of Tennyson Street were transferred from Otago Polytechnic.

St Hilda's Collegiate School is a state-integrated girls' school serving years 7 to 13 with a roll of 467 students. It was founded as an Anglican school in 1896, and moved to its current site in 1900.

Otago Boys' High School and Otago Girls' High School are single-sex secondary schools serving years 9 to 13 with rolls of 876 and 732 students, respectively. Otago Boys' started in 1863 and Otago Girls' in 1871.

Rolls are as of March 2026,
