= Arthur Street Cemetery =

Cemetery in Dunedin, Otago, New Zealand

Coordinates: 45.873342°S 170.494439°E

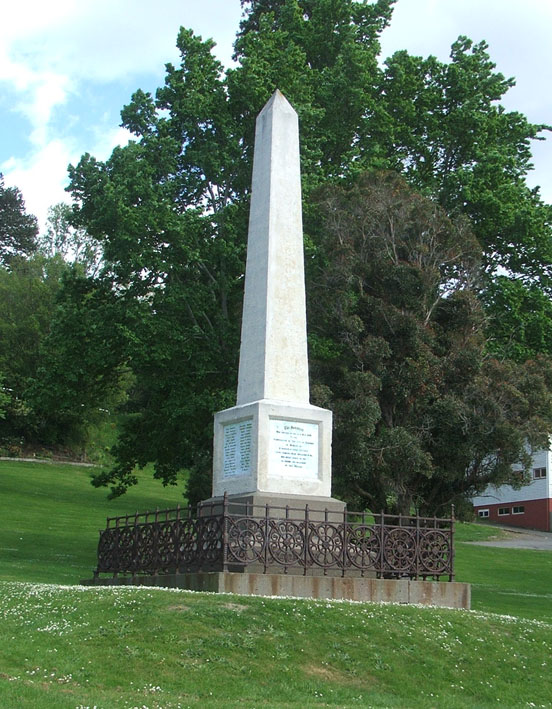
The site of the cemetery is marked by an obelisk.

Arthur Street cemetery was the first cemetery built in Dunedin, New Zealand. It is situated on the City Rise, on the corner of Arthur Street and Rattray Street, on the slopes overlooking the city's centre, which lies 500 metres to the east. The first burial at the site was of surveyor's labourer James Campbell, buried on 29 October 1846, over a year before the settlement of Dunedin was founded in 1848. Coincidentally, the first christening service to be held in Dunedin occurred on the same day; both services were conducted by Rev. Charles Creed.

The cemetery served the young settlement until the early 1860s, when the rapid expansion of Dunedin due to the Otago gold rush made its location inconvenient. The cemetery was closed and the remains relocated in 1865.

The location of the cemetery is marked by an obelisk, erected in 1880, which is modelled on London's Cleopatra's Needle. The monument lists the names of the 60 or so known burials at the site. Many of those buried were children, and several were people who died at sea on their way to New Zealand.

The site has been used for several purposes since the cemetery closed, notably a military barracks during the 1860s, a meteorological station, and a lunatic asylum. Middle District School, one of the city's first (now Arthur Street School), moved to occupy part of the site in 1877.

The site is now partly in the grounds of Otago Boys' High School and partly a public park, Arthur Street Reserve.
