= Musselburgh, New Zealand =

Musselburgh
- Suburb
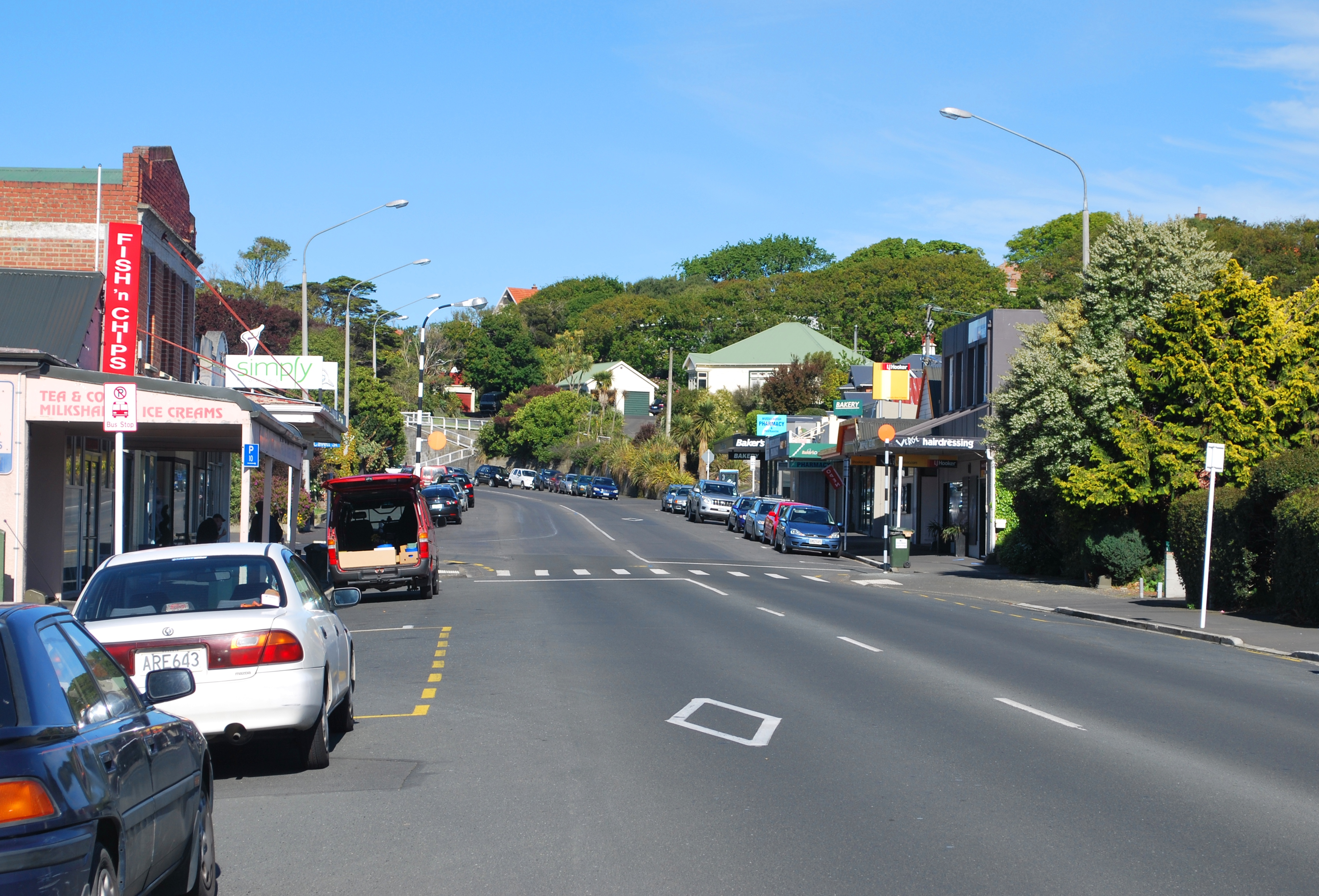
- Musselburgh Rise
- Interactive map of Musselburgh
- Coordinates: 45.8978°S 170.5159°E
- Country: New Zealand
- City: Dunedin
- Local authority: Dunedin City Council

Area
  - Land: 58 ha (140 acres)

Population (June 2025)
  - Total: 1,580
  - Density: 2,700/km^{2} (7,100/sq mi)

South Dunedin	(Otago Harbour)	Vauxhall
	Musselburgh	Andersons Bay
St Kilda		Tainui

Musselburgh is a residential suburb of the New Zealand city of Dunedin. It is located in the southeast of the city's urban area, 2.8 kilometres (1.7 mi) southeast of the city's centre, and at the narrowest point of the isthmus which joins Otago Peninsula to the rest of the South Island (here just 1.5 kilometres (0.93 mi) in width). The suburb takes its name from the similarly named town in Scotland. Musselburgh's 2001 population was 2,835.

== Geographical features ==
Musselburgh's most distinctive feature is a rocky outcrop called the Musselburgh Rise, which rises prominently above the eastern end of "The Flat", the local name for the broad coastal plain which stretches across the suburbs of Saint Kilda and South Dunedin. The Rise is located close to the southernmost point of the Otago Harbour immediately to the west of the Andersons Bay Inlet. Another outcrop, geologically part of the same formation, lies several hundred metres to the east, and has been extensively quarried.

The rise lends its name to the suburb's main street, Musselburgh Rise (differentiated in name from the outcrop by always being written without the definite article), which connects with the southern end of Andersons Bay Road and skirts the southern flank of the outcrop. Musselburgh Rise contains the suburb's small retail area, consisting of some dozen or so shops. This shopping area and the southern flank of the Rise is sometimes considered a separate suburb, Sunshine, which was at one time known as Goat Hill.

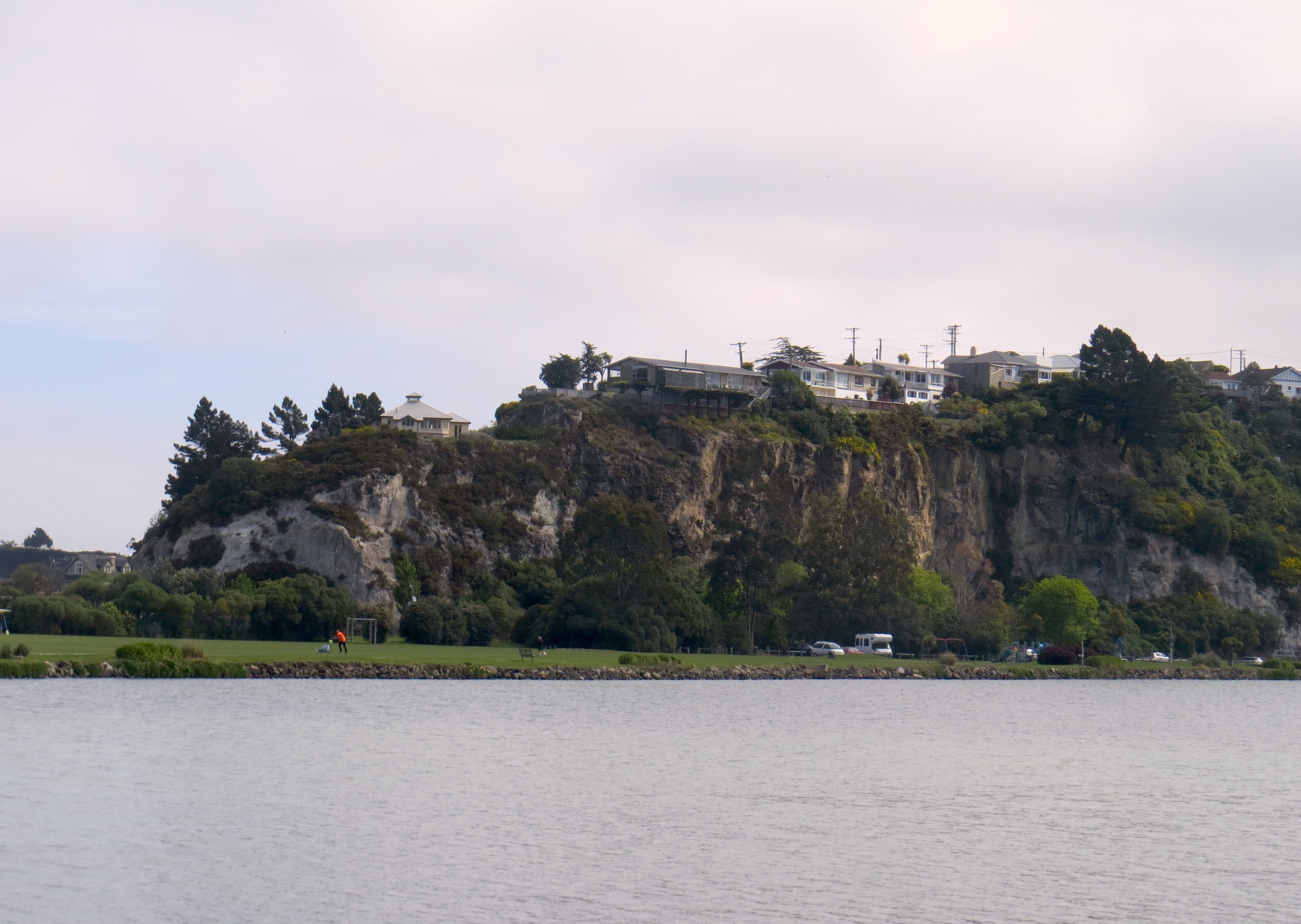
The rocky outcrop of the Musselburgh Rise, seen from the eastern edge of Anderson's Bay Inlet.

The northern side of the Musselburgh Rise is skirted by another main thoroughfare, Portobello Road. This road joins with the southern end of Portsmouth Drive close to the northeastern point of the rise, and continues across the causeway at Andersons Bay Inlet, though the junction is a limited one, and traffic may not turn right from the Musselburgh part of Portsmouth Drive to continue across the causeway. Close to the junction is a large memorial stone to the Taranaki Māori prisoners of the New Zealand Wars who were transported south to Dunedin, many of whom constructed the causeway and much of Dunedin's foreshore roads as forced labour. A branch railway ran along Portobello Road in this area from the 1870s until 1912, and rail links continued to the suburb until the track were lifted in 1928.

== Demographics ==
Musselburgh covers 0.58 km^{2} (0.22 sq mi) and had an estimated population of 1,580 as of June 2025, with a population density of 2,724 people per km^{2}.

Historical population
Year	Pop.	±% p.a.
2006	1,524	—
2013	1,569	+0.42%
2018	1,515	−0.70%

Musselburgh had a population of 1,515 at the 2018 New Zealand census, a decrease of 54 people (−3.4%) since the 2013 census, and a decrease of 9 people (−0.6%) since the 2006 census. There were 612 households, comprising 723 males and 795 females, giving a sex ratio of 0.91 males per female. The median age was 39.6 years (compared with 37.4 years nationally), with 282 people (18.6%) aged under 15 years, 285 (18.8%) aged 15 to 29, 702 (46.3%) aged 30 to 64, and 249 (16.4%) aged 65 or older.

Ethnicities were 87.1% European/Pākehā, 9.1% Māori, 3.8% Pasifika, 6.3% Asian, and 3.8% other ethnicities. People may identify with more than one ethnicity.

The percentage of people born overseas was 19.6, compared with 27.1% nationally.

Although some people chose not to answer the census's question about religious affiliation, 58.2% had no religion, 32.5% were Christian, 0.4% were Hindu, 0.8% were Muslim, 0.8% were Buddhist and 2.0% had other religions.

Of those at least 15 years old, 393 (31.9%) people had a bachelor's or higher degree, and 177 (14.4%) people had no formal qualifications. The median income was $31,600, compared with $31,800 nationally. 213 people (17.3%) earned over $70,000 compared to 17.2% nationally. The employment status of those at least 15 was that 630 (51.1%) people were employed full-time, 183 (14.8%) were part-time, and 63 (5.1%) were unemployed.

== Amenities ==
Musselburgh's residential area includes the top of the Musselburgh Rise, and spreads east and south along the eastern edge of the suburb of Saint Kilda. Other surrounding suburbs include Andersons Bay in the east, Tahuna in the southeast, and Tainui in the south. The top of the rise includes several larger homes, notably including Belmont, built in the 1860s for politician and newspaper editor William Cutten. Belmont was later owned by Sidney Neill, and became famed for its gardens Neill was the son of Percy Neill, founder of Neill & Co, which was to become New Zealand's largest importer of spirits. Sidney Neill's widow lived at Belmont until the late 1950s when the large house was sold, divided and the property broken up into separate sections. The Rise was also home to Sir Norman Haggitt.

== Education ==
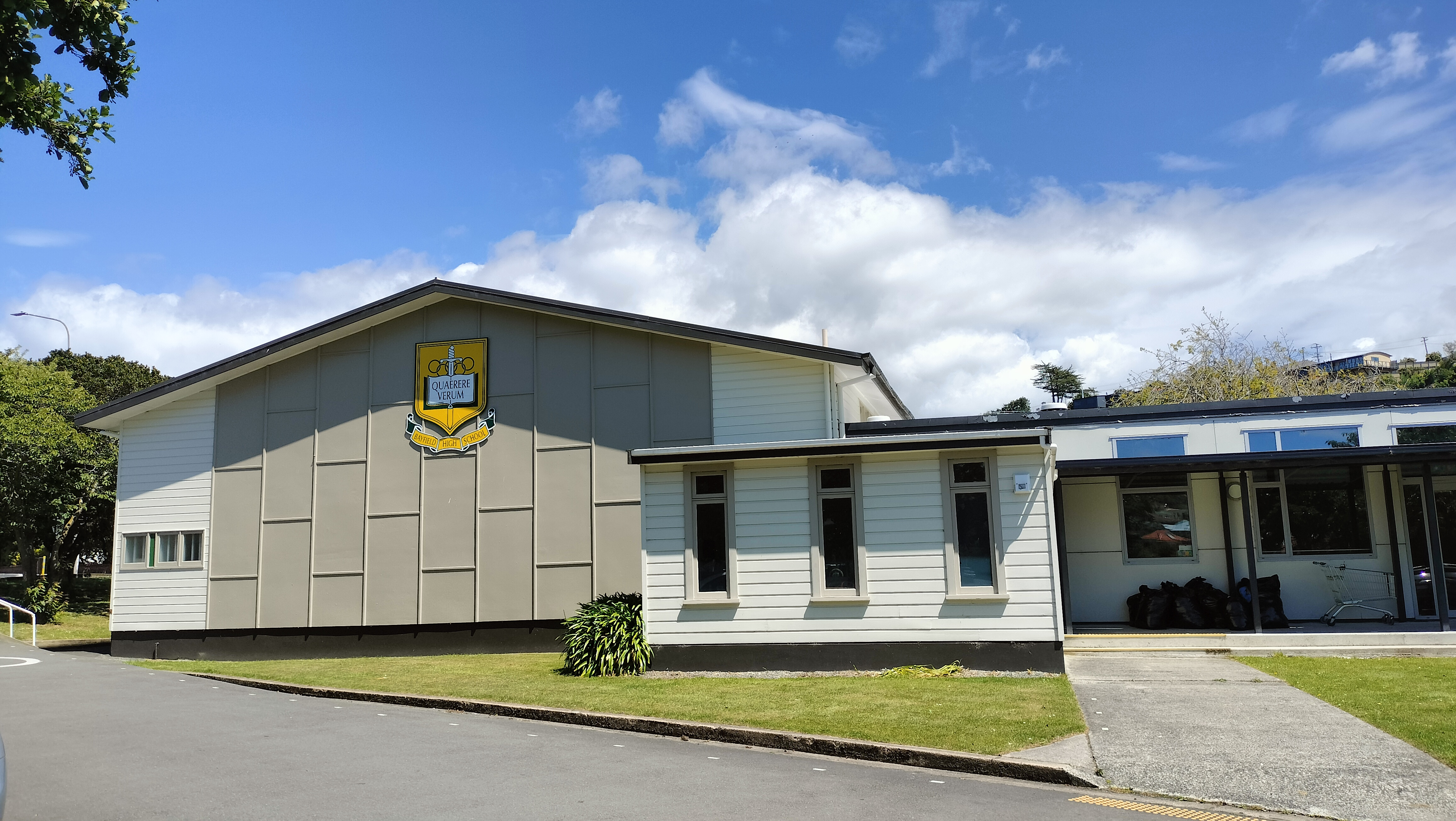
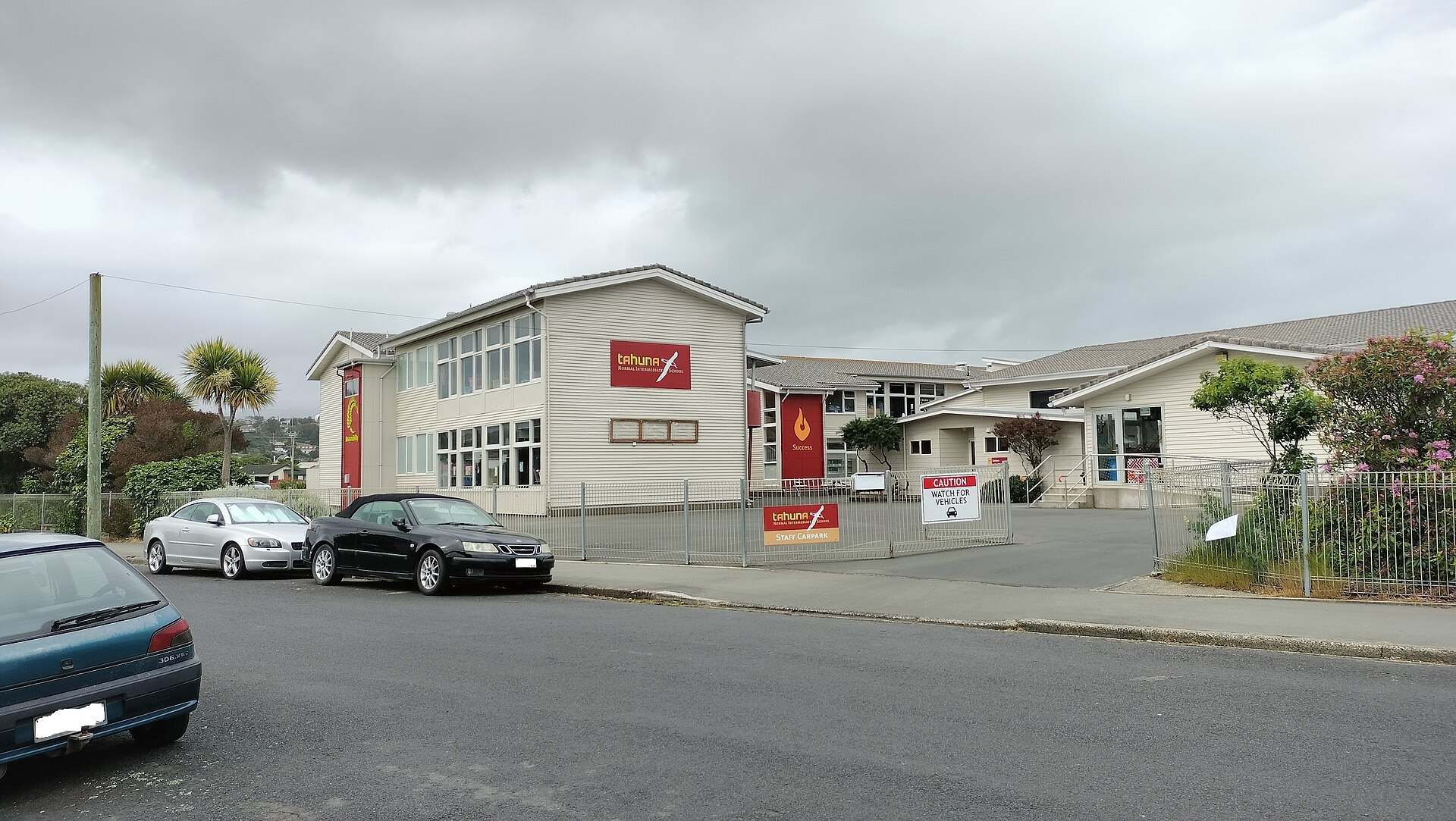
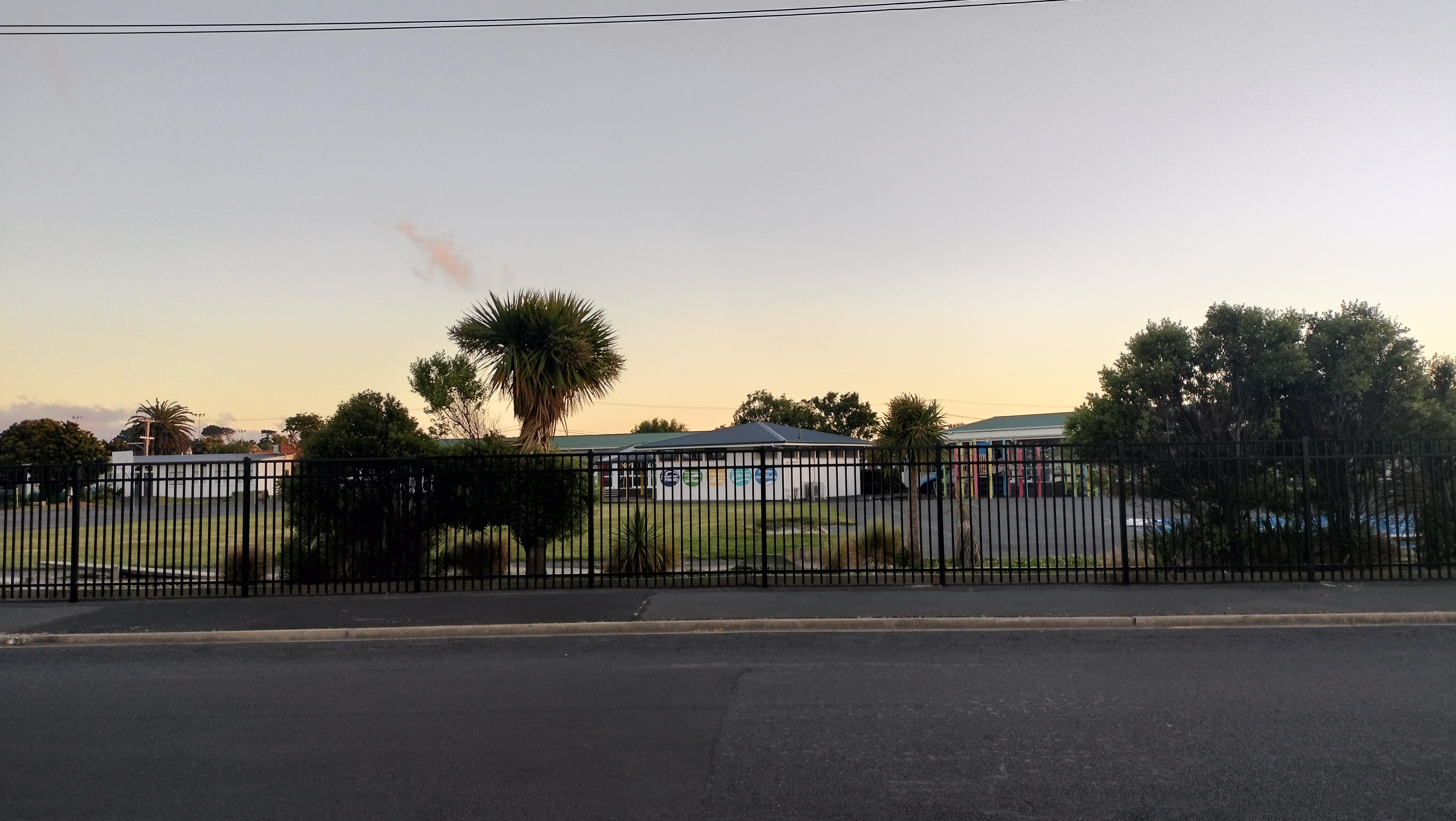
Bayfield High School, Tahuna Normal Intermediate School, and Musselburgh School

Close to the eastern edge of the rise is one of Dunedin's main secondary schools, Bayfield High School. This school lies close to the boundary of the suburbs of Musselburgh and Andersons Bay. Bayfield High School serves years 9 to 13 and has a roll of 544 students. It was established in 1961.

Tahuna Normal Intermediate School is south of Musselburgh on Victoria Road. It serves years 7 to 8 with a roll of 498 students. The school opened in 1961, although the manual training block opened in 1960.

Musselburgh School is adjacent to Tahuna Normal Intermediate and serves years 1 to 6 with a roll of 116 students. It opened in 1905.

All three are coeducational state schools. Rolls are as of March 2026.
