= Hāwea Flat =

Rural settlement in the South Island of New Zealand

- Rural settlement
- Interactive map of Hāwea Flat
- Coordinates: 44.652°S 169.289°E
- Country: New Zealand
- Region: Otago
- Territorial authority: Queenstown-Lakes District
- Ward: Wānaka-Upper Clutha Ward
- Community: Wānaka-Upper Clutha Community
- Electorates: Waitaki; Te Tai Tonga (Māori)

Government
  - Territorial authority: Queenstown-Lakes District Council
  - Regional council: Otago Regional Council
  - Mayor of Queenstown-Lakes: John Glover
  - Waitaki MP: Miles Anderson
  - Te Tai Tonga MP: Tākuta Ferris

Area
  - Total: 16.66 km^{2} (6.43 sq mi)

Population (June 2025)
  - Total: 600
  - Density: 36/km^{2} (93/sq mi)
- Time zone: UTC+12 (NZST)
  - Summer (DST): UTC+13 (NZDT)
- Postcode: 9382
- Area code: 03
- Local iwi: Ngāi Tahu

Hāwea Flat is a rural settlement in the Queenstown-Lakes District of the South Island of New Zealand. Lake Hāwea is 5 km north. The area was named for Hāwea-i-te-raki, an ancestor of the Ngāti Hāwea hapū. The macron was officially added to the place name in 2010. It is located to the east of State Highway 6 between Albert Town and Lake Hāwea.

== Demographics ==
Hāwea Flat is described by Statistics New Zealand as a rural settlement. It covers 16.66 km^{2} (6.43 sq mi) and had an estimated population of 600 as of June 2025, with a population density of 36 people per km^{2}. It is part of the Upper Clutha Valley statistical area.

Historical population
Year	Pop.	±% p.a.
2006	279	—
2013	402	+5.36%
2018	543	+6.20%

Hāwea Flat had a population of 543 at the 2018 New Zealand census, an increase of 141 people (35.1%) since the 2013 census, and an increase of 264 people (94.6%) since the 2006 census. There were 180 households, comprising 273 males and 267 females, giving a sex ratio of 1.02 males per female, with 144 people (26.5%) aged under 15 years, 57 (10.5%) aged 15 to 29, 315 (58.0%) aged 30 to 64, and 27 (5.0%) aged 65 or older.

Ethnicities were 97.8% European/Pākehā, 7.7% Māori, 0.6% Asian, and 1.7% other ethnicities. People may identify with more than one ethnicity.

Although some people chose not to answer the census's question about religious affiliation, 72.4% had no religion, 18.2% were Christian, 1.1% were Hindu, 1.1% were Buddhist and 2.2% had other religions.

Of those at least 15 years old, 132 (33.1%) people had a bachelor's or higher degree, and 33 (8.3%) people had no formal qualifications. 75 people (18.8%) earned over $70,000 compared to 17.2% nationally. The employment status of those at least 15 was that 234 (58.6%) people were employed full-time, and 78 (19.5%) were part-time.

== Education ==
Hāwea Flat School is a contributing primary school for years 1 to 6 with a roll of 394 students as of July 2026. The school opened in 1882.
