= Peyton DePriest =

American soccer player (born 1999)

Personal information
- Full name: Peyton Nicole DePriest
- Date of birth: September 24, 1999 (age 27)
- Place of birth: Bowling Green, Kentucky
- Height: 1.64 m (5 ft 5 in)
- Position: Forward

College career
Years	Team	Apps	(Gls)
2017–2021	Middle Tennessee Blue Raiders	71	(58)

Senior career*
Years	Team	Apps	(Gls)
2022–2023	Saint-Étienne	19	(14)
- * Club domestic league appearances and goals

Peyton Nicole DePriest (born September 24, 1999, in Bowling Green, Kentucky) is an American former soccer player who played as a striker for AS Saint-Étienne.

== Early life and education ==
DePriest was born in Bowling Green, Kentucky on September 24, 1999. She grew up in Franklin, Tennessee and attended Franklin High School.

From 2010 to 2018, DePriest played for the Tennessee Soccer Club, winning the U18 National Championship her final year.

In 2021, she received a bachelor's degree in exercise science from Middle Tennessee State University with a 3.94 grade point average. She immediately entered a master's program in Leisure, Sport, and Tourism Management.

== Career ==
During her time at Middle Tennessee State University (MTSU), DePriest was a prominent member of the women's soccer team. In her first season, she showcased her skills by scoring 13 goals, resulting in her sharing the top spot nationally with Khadija Shaw for the highest number of goals scored by a freshman. Her performance earned her the title of C-USA Freshman of the Year, followed by the recognition of 2018 C-USA Player of the Year. That summer, she also participated in the U23 national training camp. In 2018, 2019, and 2021, she was honored with the title of C-USA Offensive Player of the Year, becoming the second player in program history to receive the honor. By the time of her graduation, DePriest held MTSU records for the most career goals scored (58), best career shooting percentage, and single-season goals per game mark. Furthermore, she had secured C-USA records for career goals (58) and career points (127).

In 2022, DePriest made her professional debut when she signed with AS Saint-Étienne in France.
