= Waiwera South =

Coordinates: 46.217°S 169.492°E

Waiwera South is a small settlement in the South Island of New Zealand, close to the boundary between the Otago and Southland regions. The settlement is located between Balclutha and Clinton, immediately to the south of State Highway 1, between branches of the Waiwera River and Kaihiku Stream, two minor tributaries of the Clutha River. The South Island Main Trunk railway also runs through the township. The settlement's population is around 100.

The land to the north of Waiwera South is flat, part of the floodplain of the Clutha; to the south, the land rises to form the Kaihiku Hills, the northernmost edge of the hilly ranges which form much of The Catlins.

The settlement's name is thought to have originally been Waiwhero. This name, though seeming to come from Māori words meaning "red water", is more likely the name of a local Waitaha chief. A local shibboleth is the occasional use of the non-standard pronunciation "wy-vra" to refer to the town, as opposed to the usual Māori pronunciation "wy-weh-rah".

== Education ==
Waiwera South School is a co-educational state primary school for Year 1 to 8 students, with a roll of 26 as of July 2025.
