= Mornington, Dunedin =

Suburb of Dunedin, New Zealand

Mornington
- Suburb
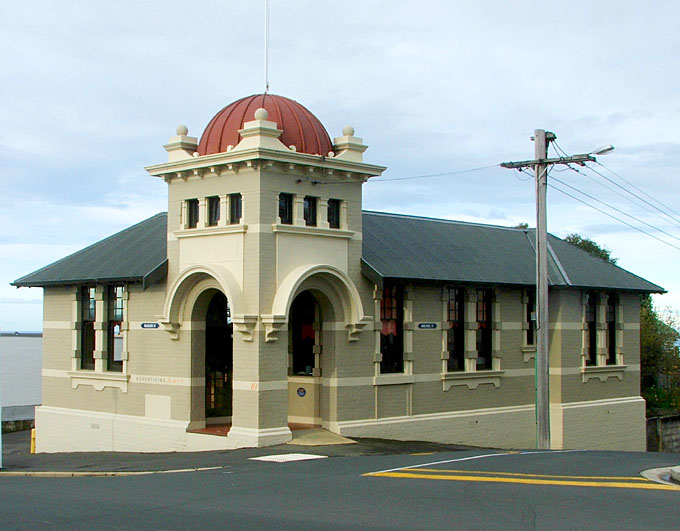
- Mornington's distinctive former post office building in Mailer Street
- Interactive map of Mornington
- Coordinates: 45.8824°S 170.4777°E
- Country: New Zealand
- City: Dunedin
- Local authority: Dunedin City Council

Area
  - Land: 109 ha (270 acres)

Population (June 2025)
  - Total: 2,910
  - Density: 2,670/km^{2} (6,910/sq mi)

	Belleknowes	City Rise
Kenmure	Mornington
Dunedin North	Maryhill	South Dunedin

Mornington is a suburb of the city of Dunedin, in the South Island of New Zealand. It is situated on hilly slopes 2 kilometres (1.2 mi) to the west of the city centre, the slopes forming part of a ridge which surrounds the heart of the city.

According to the 2013 New Zealand census, Mornington has a population of 3,267, a decrease of 126 people since the 2006 census. There were 1,518 males and 1,749 females.

The use of the name Mornington for the area was first recorded in 1862. There seems to be some conjecture about the origin of the name – some sources record it as being purely descriptive, with the suburb receiving the first rays of the sunrise. There is some likelihood, however, that it was named by early landholder David Mailer after Mornington, Victoria. Mornington was a separate borough until amalgamation with Dunedin city in 1916

Mornington's main streets are Mailer Street, Elgin Road, Glenpark Avenue, Eglinton Road, and Kenmure Road. It is a mainly residential suburb, with a retail area on Mailer Street. The suburb is surrounded by the suburbs of Kenmure to the west, Roslyn to the north, Maryhill to the southwest, Belleknowes to the northeast, and The Glen – divided roughly between Mornington and Caversham in the southeast.

To the east lies the City Rise, an area that includes some old grand houses which surround the southern end of the city centre. The Town Belt, a bush-clad green belt dating to the early years of Dunedin's settlement, follows the slopes of the ridge, and lies immediately below Mornington, most prominently to the northeast.

Mornington is the home to several sports grounds and teams, and was the site of New Zealand's first golf course, opened in 1872. The Zingari-Richmond Rugby Club is based at Montecillo ground in Eglinton Road. Montecillo, the city's home for war veterans, was moved from Eglinton Road to South Dunedin in the 1990s. Immediately above Montecillo ground is Unity Park, which is a venue for Mornington Football (soccer) club. Unity Park affords panoramic views across the central city, and is the site of a statue of Antarctic explorer Admiral Richard Byrd, commemorating the 1928 departure for the southern continent from Dunedin by Byrd's 1928 expedition

Landmarks within Mornington include the suburb's former post office in Mailer Street, a distinctive building completed in 1905 with small a mock-Byzantine domed tower above the entrance.

== Demographics ==
Mornington covers 1.09 km^{2} (0.42 sq mi) and had an estimated population of 2,910 as of June 2025, with a population density of 2,670 people per km^{2}.

Historical population
Year	Pop.	±% p.a.
2006	2,820	—
2013	2,703	−0.60%
2018	2,802	+0.72%

Mornington had a population of 2,802 at the 2018 New Zealand census, an increase of 99 people (3.7%) since the 2013 census, and a decrease of 18 people (−0.6%) since the 2006 census. There were 1,176 households, comprising 1,374 males and 1,428 females, giving a sex ratio of 0.96 males per female. The median age was 35.0 years (compared with 37.4 years nationally), with 468 people (16.7%) aged under 15 years, 699 (24.9%) aged 15 to 29, 1,305 (46.6%) aged 30 to 64, and 330 (11.8%) aged 65 or older.

Ethnicities were 84.6% European/Pākehā, 12.1% Māori, 4.2% Pasifika, 8.6% Asian, and 2.8% other ethnicities. People may identify with more than one ethnicity.

The percentage of people born overseas was 19.8, compared with 27.1% nationally.

Although some people chose not to answer the census's question about religious affiliation, 59.0% had no religion, 27.5% were Christian, 0.4% had Māori religious beliefs, 1.3% were Hindu, 0.7% were Muslim, 1.0% were Buddhist and 3.0% had other religions.

Of those at least 15 years old, 729 (31.2%) people had a bachelor's or higher degree, and 348 (14.9%) people had no formal qualifications. The median income was $31,700, compared with $31,800 nationally. 315 people (13.5%) earned over $70,000 compared to 17.2% nationally. The employment status of those at least 15 was that 1,200 (51.4%) people were employed full-time, 396 (17.0%) were part-time, and 87 (3.7%) were unemployed.

== Education ==
Mornington School is a state contributing primary school serving years 1 to 6 with a roll of 227 students as of March 2026. The school first opened in 1865.
