= Tim Priest (police officer) =

Australian police officer and author

Tim Priest, is a former New South Wales Police Detective Sergeant in Australia. He served in the Sydney suburb of Cabramatta and led a police revolt against his commanders for failing to take action about gang crime and heroin dealing in South West Sydney. Prime Minister John Howard announced that Tim Priest would be the new Chairman of the Prime Minister's Crime Advisory Board and advise the Coalition Federal Government on Crime Prevention initiatives.

He wrote a book called To Protect And To Serve with Richard Basham about his experiences dealing with the drug trade and the police service.

In 2002 he gave evidence to an enquiry into the crime- and drugs ridden suburb of Cabramatta and attracted national and international headlines. His testimony led to the resignations or sackings of the State's Police Minister, Education Minister, Police Commissioner and Deputy and Assistant Commissioners. Major changes were made to the NSW police force and the way that police handle gangs and drugs in Sydney.

The Cabramatta Parliamentary Enquiry's final report (2002) recommended that the Government adopt some of the initiatives that Priest had offered as a means to solving the crisis in Cabramatta. Ultimately the NSW Government adopted the recommendations and the NSW Police implemented them in 2002.

In 2003, he gave a talk at a Quadrant dinner in November 2003 titled "The Rise of Middle Eastern Crime in Australia" in which he also talked about his experiences policing specific households of people of Lebanese descent, and criticised police commissioner Peter Ryan and journalist Mike Carlton.
