= Vernon Leader =

New Zealand cricketer

Personal information
- Full name: John Vernon Leader
- Born: 14 May 1908; Christchurch, Canterbury, New Zealand
- Died: 22 March 1995 (aged 86); Dunedin, Otago, New Zealand
- Batting: Left-handed
- Bowling: Right-arm medium

Domestic team information
- Years: Team
- 1928/29–1940/41: Otago

Career statistics
Competition	First-class
Matches	11
Runs scored	292
Batting average	17.17
100s/50s	0/1
Top score	58
Balls bowled	1315
Wickets	18
Bowling average	26.38
5 wickets in innings	1
10 wickets in match	0
Best bowling	6/44
Catches/stumpings	2/–
- Source: ESPNcricinfo, 7 February 2024

John Vernon Leader (14 May 1908 – 22 March 1995) was a New Zealand cricketer and mountaineer. He played eleven first-class matches for Otago between the 1928–29 and 1940–41 seasons.

Leader was born at Christchurch in 1908 but was educated at Otago Boys' High School in Dunedin. He played schools representative cricket for Otago.

Leader made his senior representative debut during the 1928–29 season in a Plunket Shield match against Auckland at Carisbrook, scoring seven runs and not taking a wicket. He played irregularly for the provincial side―his next two first-class appearances were during Otago's Plunket Shield winning campaign of 1932–33. In a total of 11 first-class matches he scored 292 runs and took 18 wickets, making his last first-class appearances during the 1940–41 season. His best performance came in the 1938–39 Plunket Shield, when he took 6 for 44 and 3 for 58 against Auckland. In the 1950s he was one of the selectors for Otago.

Leader was a notable mountain climber. In 1935 he became the first person to climb West Peak on Mount Earnslaw alone. In 1972, aged 64, he became the oldest person to make the "grand traverse" of Mount Cook's three peaks.
