= Tahuna Normal Intermediate School =

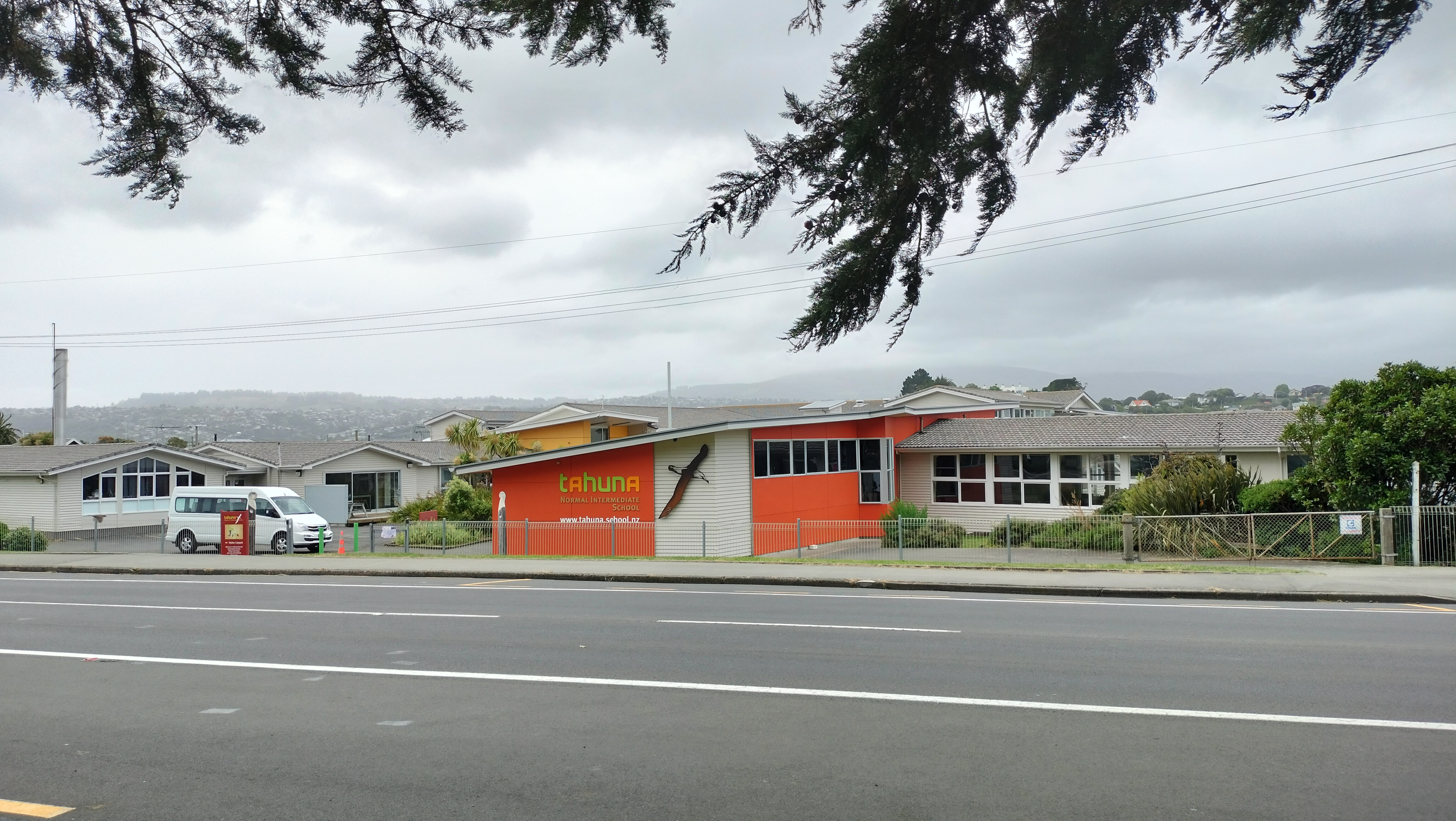
- View of school buildings from Tahuna Road

Location
- 31 Auld Street, St. Kilda, Dunedin; 45.904018°S 170.517192°E

Information
- Type: State Intermediate (Years 7, 8)
- Ministry of Education Institution no.: 3839
- Principal: Simon Clarke
- Gender: Co-educational
- Enrolment: 494 (July 2026)
- Socio-economic decile: 8
- Website: tahuna.school.nz

Tahuna Normal Intermediate School is a school for Year 7 (Form One) and Year 8 (Form Two) students, based in St Kilda, Dunedin, New Zealand. It is near St Kilda Beach.

== History ==
In 2021, the school awarded a contract to Pacific Membrane Group to build a 20m by 40m "outdoor sports canopy." Construction began in 2022 but was still incomplete by May 2024. The Otago Daily Times reported that several schools across the country were experiencing supply issues with school-led projects.
