= Andersons Bay =

Suburb of Dunedin, New Zealand

- Suburb
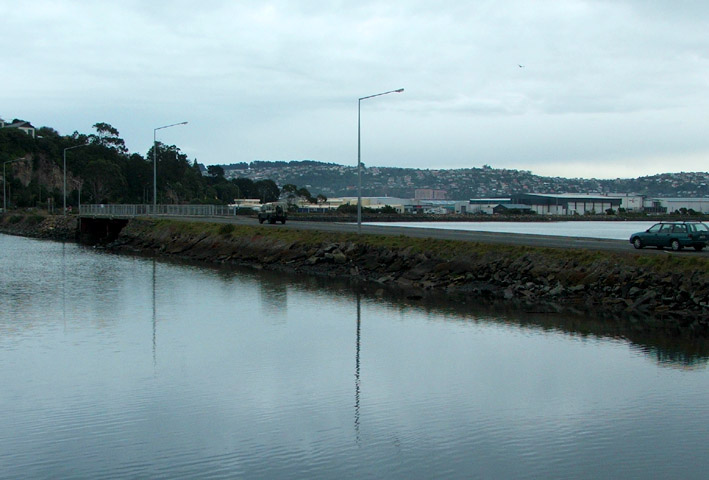
- Causeway across the mouth of the Andersons Bay Inlet
- Interactive map of Andersons Bay
- Coordinates: 45.8950°S 170.5284°E
- Country: New Zealand
- City: Dunedin
- Local authority: Dunedin City Council

Area
  - Land: 126 ha (310 acres)

Population (June 2025)
  - Total: 2,450
  - Density: 1,940/km^{2} (5,040/sq mi)

Vauxhall	Waverley	Shiel Hill
Musselburgh	Andersons Bay
Tahuna	Tainui	Ocean Grove

Andersons Bay (sometimes spelt in the grammatically correct former form Anderson's Bay, and often known locally as "Andy Bay") is a suburb of the New Zealand city of Dunedin. It is located in the southeast of the city's urban area, 2.8 kilometres (1.7 mi) southeast of the city's centre.

== Geography ==
The suburb of Andersons Bay extends south from the Andersons Bay Inlet, an indentation in the southern shore of the Otago Harbour, and across the isthmus joining the Otago Peninsula to the mainland.

The suburb's name is also occasionally used by Dunedinites for the area extending north along the Southern Endowment, an area of land reclaimed from the harbour which sits close to its western shore – towards the suburb of South Dunedin. This area, which was reclaimed during the mid-twentieth century, was the location of the bay for which the suburb is named. The Southern Endowment, largely used for light industrial purposes, also includes a sports complex, the Edgar Centre.

South of the Andersons Bay Inlet the suburb comprises residential housing. It is bounded by Musselburgh in the west and southwest, Shiel Hill in the east, and the coastal suburbs of Tahuna and Tainui in the south. These two smaller suburbs, which lie close to the Pacific Ocean, are often considered part of either Andersons Bay or Musselburgh. The rocky outcrops of the Musselburgh Rise stand immediately to the west and south of the Andersons Bay Inlet.

Close to the southern edge of the Andersons Bay Inlet a large memorial stone commemorates the Taranaki Māori prisoners of the New Zealand Wars who were transported south to Dunedin, many of whom constructed the causeway across the head of the inlet and much of Dunedin's foreshore roads as forced labour. A branch railway ran along Portobello Road in this area from the 1870s until 1912.

One of Dunedin's secondary schools, Bayfield High School stands on reclaimed land at the southern end of the inlet. This school lies close to the boundary of the suburbs of Andersons Bay and Musselburgh.

Andersons Bay's main roads include Portobello Road and Portsmouth Drive (in the industrial area north of the inlet, and Musselburgh Rise, Silverton Street, and Somerville Street (in the residential area to the south). Shore Street and Marne Street skirt the western and eastern shores of the inlet; Marne Street links with Larnach Road, which runs steeply up to the suburbs of Waverley and Vauxhall.

== History ==
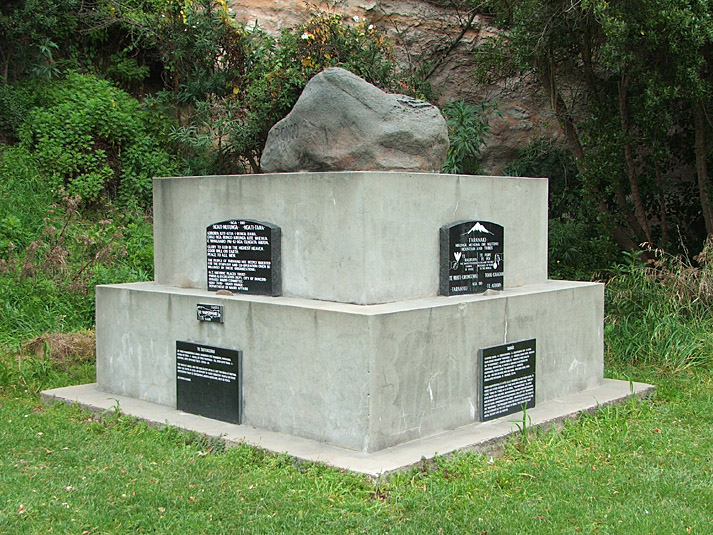
Rongo (memorial stone) to Taranaki Māori transported to Dunedin during the Land Wars.

Māori named the area Puketai or Puketahi, probably meaning "single or isolated hill". It is likely that a pā of this name was sited somewhere in the vicinity, possibly on the rise overlooking Tomahawk Lagoon in what is now the suburb's southeast, or on some section of the Musselburgh Rise. Such a site would have commanded a strategic position prior to the reclamation of land from the harbour and from swamp, as it would have controlled almost all land passage to the Otago Peninsula.

Andersons Bay gained its current name due to early settler James Anderson and his son and daughter-in-law John and Isabella, who were the first European settlers in the district in 1844 - four years before the official founding of the Otago Settlement and Dunedin. James's grandson John was the first European child born in the area, in 1846. Their home was close to what is now the corner of Somerville and Silverton Streets, a corner known for many years by the now almost-forgotten name of Ross's Corner.

Andersons Bay Inlet, once known as Andersons Cove, represents the remnant of a far larger expanse of water which included the long-reclaimed Tainui Inlet. Much of this was reclaimed in the 1950s to provide grounds for Bayfield High School. In the late 19th century both a railway and ferry service connected this area with central Dunedin, but neither has survived. The ferry operated only during the 1890s, and the railway operated from 1877 until the early years of the twentieth century. Rail planners envisaged a railway line running along the shore of the peninsula to Portobello, but Andersons Bay was the furthest the line ever reached.

Andersons Bay had its own council briefly, the Bay Town Board. This administered the area from 1905 until its amalgamation with Dunedin City in 1912.

Andersons Bay lost its post office when 580 others closed, or were reduced, on 5 February 1988.

Andersons Bay hit news headlines in 1995 after one of New Zealand's most notorious crimes took place in Every Street, close to the boundary of Andersons Bay and Shiel Hill. The case, in which five of the six members of the Bain family were slain, led to one of New Zealand's most prominent causes célèbres after the arrest of the remaining member of the family, David Bain, for the murders. David Bain, found guilty, served 13 years of a life sentence before succeeding in having the case reopened. His retrial, in 2009, resulted in a verdict of "not guilty".

On 15 March 2019 part of Somerville Street in Andersons Bay was cordoned off while police, including Armed Offenders Squad officers, searched a house formerly occupied by the perpetrator of the Christchurch mosque shootings.

On 18 February 2026 a landslip on Belmont Lane led to the evacuation of seven properties and the temporary closure of Portobello Road between Portsmouth Drive and Timaru Street.

== Tahuna and Tainui ==
Tahuna and Tainui are two small, somewhat vaguely defined suburbs which lie to the south of Andersons Bay and Musselburgh, close to Dunedin's southern coastline (Ocean Beach). Both are often considered parts of either Musselburgh or Andersons Bay.

== Demographics ==
Andersons Bay covers 1.26 km^{2} (0.49 sq mi) and had an estimated population of 2,450 as of June 2025, with a population density of 1,944 people per km^{2}.

Historical population
Year	Pop.	±% p.a.
2006	2,391	—
2013	2,340	−0.31%
2018	2,379	+0.33%

Andersons Bay had a population of 2,379 at the 2018 New Zealand census, an increase of 39 people (1.7%) since the 2013 census, and a decrease of 12 people (−0.5%) since the 2006 census. There were 894 households, comprising 1,155 males and 1,224 females, giving a sex ratio of 0.94 males per female. The median age was 40.8 years (compared with 37.4 years nationally), with 471 people (19.8%) aged under 15 years, 402 (16.9%) aged 15 to 29, 1,152 (48.4%) aged 30 to 64, and 351 (14.8%) aged 65 or older.

Ethnicities were 92.1% European/Pākehā, 8.1% Māori, 2.3% Pasifika, 5.2% Asian, and 2.6% other ethnicities. People may identify with more than one ethnicity.

The percentage of people born overseas was 20.6, compared with 27.1% nationally.

Although some people chose not to answer the census's question about religious affiliation, 58.3% had no religion, 33.0% were Christian, 0.3% were Hindu, 0.5% were Muslim, 1.0% were Buddhist and 1.8% had other religions.

Of those at least 15 years old, 672 (35.2%) people had a bachelor's or higher degree, and 255 (13.4%) people had no formal qualifications. The median income was $35,100, compared with $31,800 nationally. 390 people (20.4%) earned over $70,000 compared to 17.2% nationally. The employment status of those at least 15 was that 984 (51.6%) people were employed full-time, 339 (17.8%) were part-time, and 63 (3.3%) were unemployed.

== Education ==
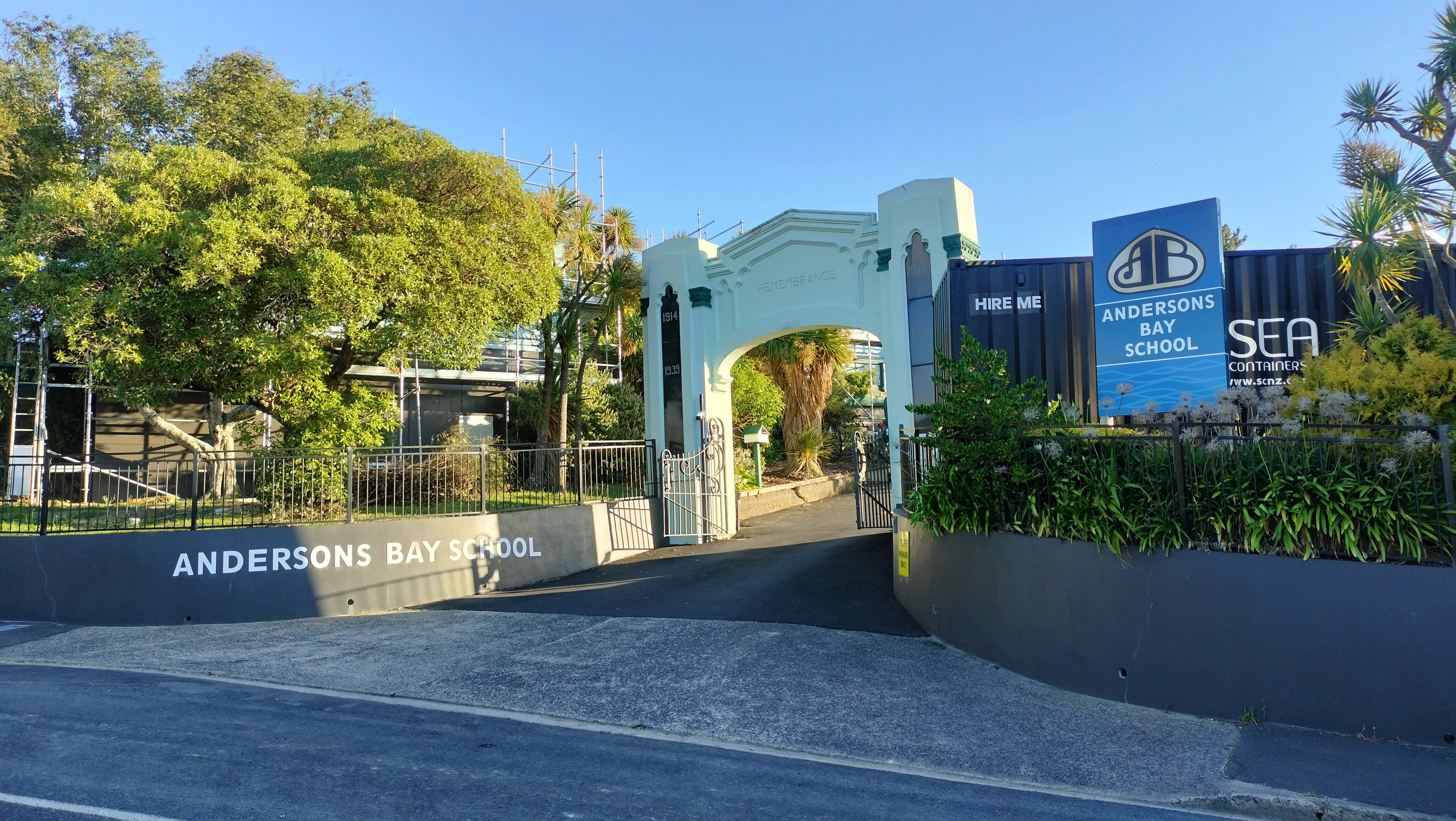
Andersons Bay School in December 2025

Andersons Bay School is a primary school for year 1 to year 6 children (5 to 10 years old). It has a decile rating of 10. It is one of the largest primary schools in Dunedin, with a roll of 289 students as of March 2026. The school brought in the use of a school uniform in 2014.

The school celebrated its 150th anniversary with a reunion in 2008.
