= Valpy =

Valpy is a surname. Notable people with the surname include:

- Abraham John Valpy (1787–1854), English printer and publisher
- Arabella Valpy (1833–1910), New Zealand Salvation Army leader
- Caroline Valpy (1804–1884), a British-New Zealand artist
- Juliet Valpy (1835–1911), New Zealand artist
- Michael Valpy (born 1942), Canadian journalist and author
- Richard Valpy (1754–1836), British schoolmaster
- William Henry Valpy (1793–1852), New Zealand settler
- William Henry Valpy, Jr. (1832–1911), New Zealand settler
- Catherine Fulton, née Valpy (1829–1919), New Zealand suffragist
- Ellen Jeffreys, née Valpy (1827–1904), New Zealand artist

== See also ==
- Valpy French (1825–1891), Anglican missionary in India and Persia
