= Abraham John Valpy =

English printer and publisher

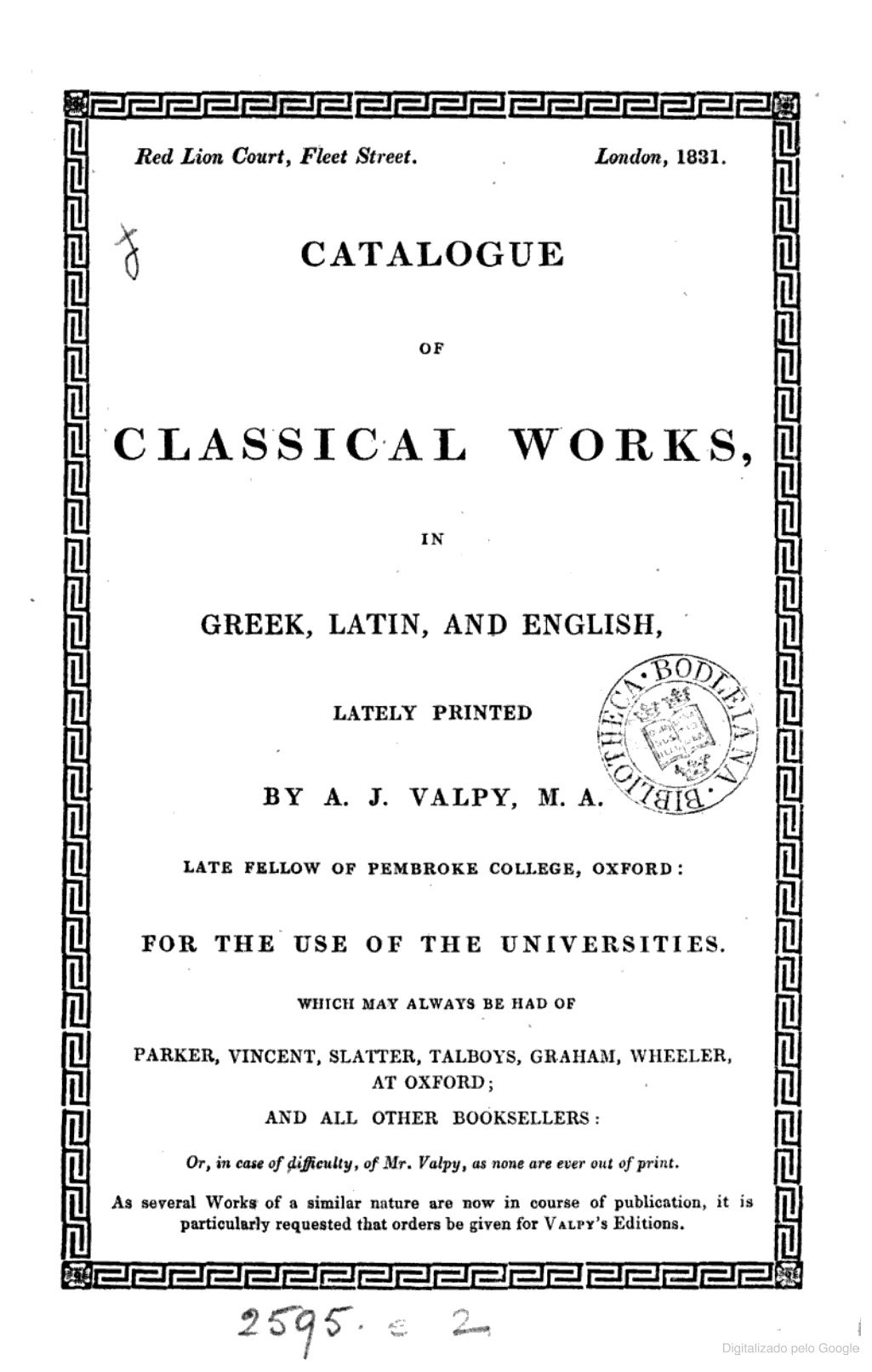
Catalogue of classical works ... lately printed by A.J. Valpy (1831)

Abraham John Valpy (1786 – 19 November 1854) was an English printer and publisher.

== Life and career ==
He was the son of the Reading schoolmaster Richard Valpy and was born in that town.

He is remembered in connection with two great undertakings in the department of classical literature. These were reissues of (1) Stephanus' Greek Thesaurus, for which E. H. Barker was chiefly responsible; and (2) Valpy's Delphin Classics, a book series of 143 volumes with text drawn from the 18th century French Delphin Classics (Ad usum Delphini) series and with variorum notes, under the editorial superintendence of George Dyer.

He also founded the Classical Journal in 1810 and published the periodical The Museum in the years 1822–1825.

In the years 1813–1828 he published The Pamphleteer, a book series described as being "a collection of the best pamphlets of the day" and which included contributions from William Wilberforce, Jeremy Bentham, George Canning, William Huskisson and Stamford Raffles.

He also published the Family Classical Library: English Translations of Greek and Latin Classics (52 volumes, 1830–1834) and an edition of the plays and poems of Shakespeare (15 Volumes, 1832–1834).

== Personal life ==
In 1813 Abraham Valpy married Harriet Teast (nee Wylde) (1788–1864). His younger brother, William Henry Valpy, migrated to New Zealand where he became a prominent settler in the Dunedin area. William's wife Caroline Valpy and daughters Ellen Jeffreys (née Valpy) and Juliet Valpy achieved a reputation as talented artists in that country. Another daughter, Arabella Valpy, was instrumental in bringing the Salvation Army to New Zealand and yet another daughter, Catherine Fulton née Valpy, was a New Zealand suffragist. The Dunedin suburbs of Caversham and Forbury were named by William in honour of his Reading roots.

== Sources ==
- Courtney, William Prideaux (1899). "Valpy, Abraham John" . Dictionary of National Biography. Vol. 58. pp. 84–85.; NB a revised edition of entry published as: Courtney, W. P.; Jenkyns, Richard. "Valpy, Abraham John (bap. 1786, d. 1854)". Oxford Dictionary of National Biography (online ed.). Oxford University Press. doi:10.1093/ref:odnb/28054. (Subscription, Wikipedia Library access or UK public library membership required.)
