= Burnside, Dunedin =

Suburb of Dunedin, New Zealand

Burnside
- Suburb
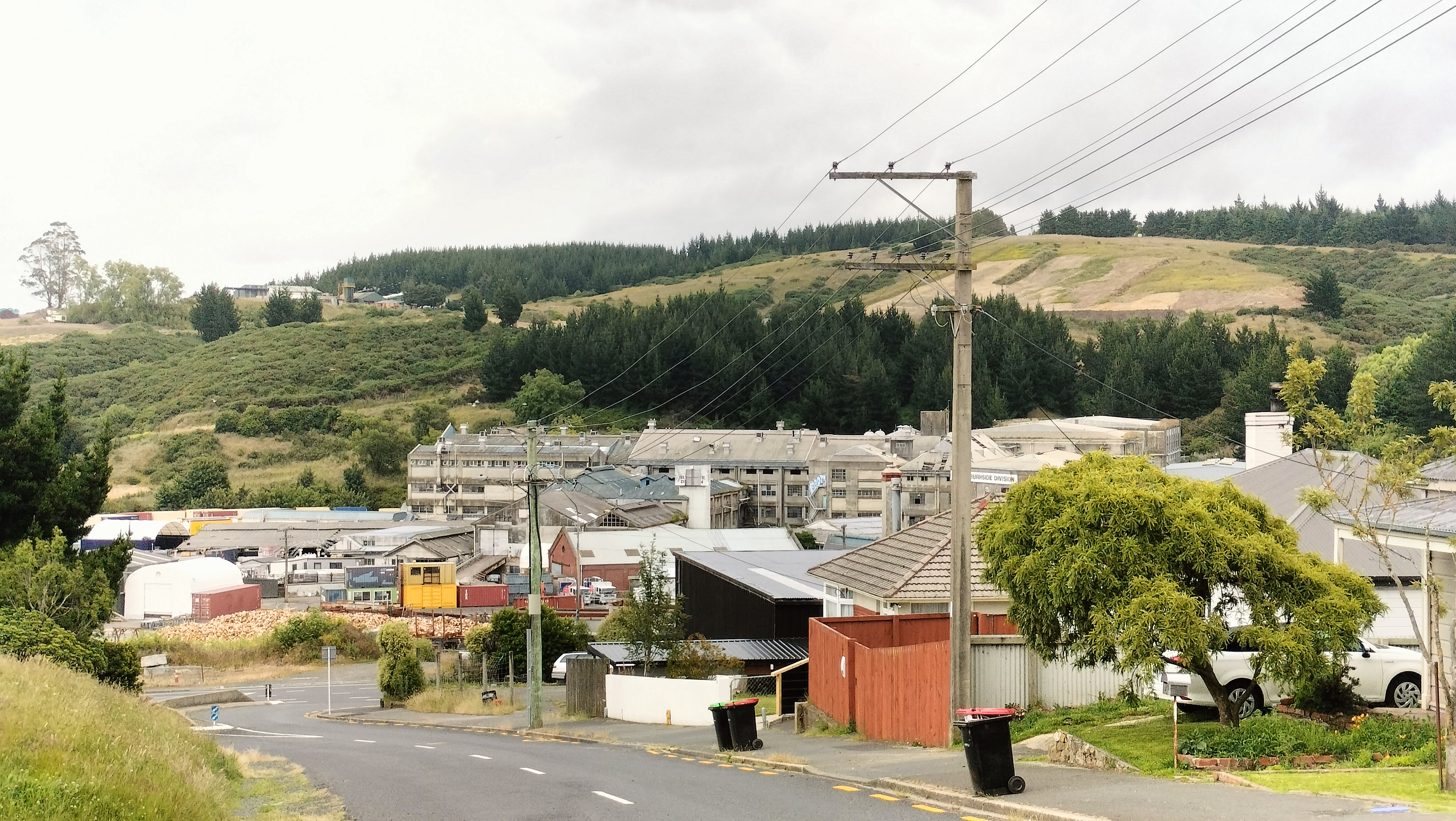
- Landscape shot of Burnside taken from Short Street
- Interactive map of Burnside
- Coordinates: 45.898°S 170.455°E
- Country: New Zealand
- City: Dunedin
- Local authority: Dunedin City Council

Area
  - Land: 192 ha (470 acres)

Population (2018 Census)
  - Total: 141
  - Density: 73.4/km^{2} (190/sq mi)

		Balaclava
Abbotsford	Burnside	Calton Hill
Green Island	Concord

Burnside is a mainly industrial suburb of the New Zealand city of Dunedin. It is located at the mouth of a long valley, the Kaikorai Valley, through which flows the Kaikorai Stream. This valley stretches to the northeast for 3.5 kilometres (2.2 mi). Burnside is 5.5 kilometres (3.4 mi) to the southwest of the city centre, close to eastern end of the much larger suburb, Green Island. Other suburbs located nearby include Concord, immediately to the southeast and Kenmure further up Kaikorai Valley.

Burnside is separated from the central urban area of Dunedin by the large ridge which surrounds the city's heart. This ridge is part of the crater wall of the long-extinct Dunedin Volcano. The ridge lies immediately to the east of Burnside, with the main pass over it, the saddle of Lookout Point, lying 0.8 kilometres (0.50 mi) to the east.

== Major industries ==
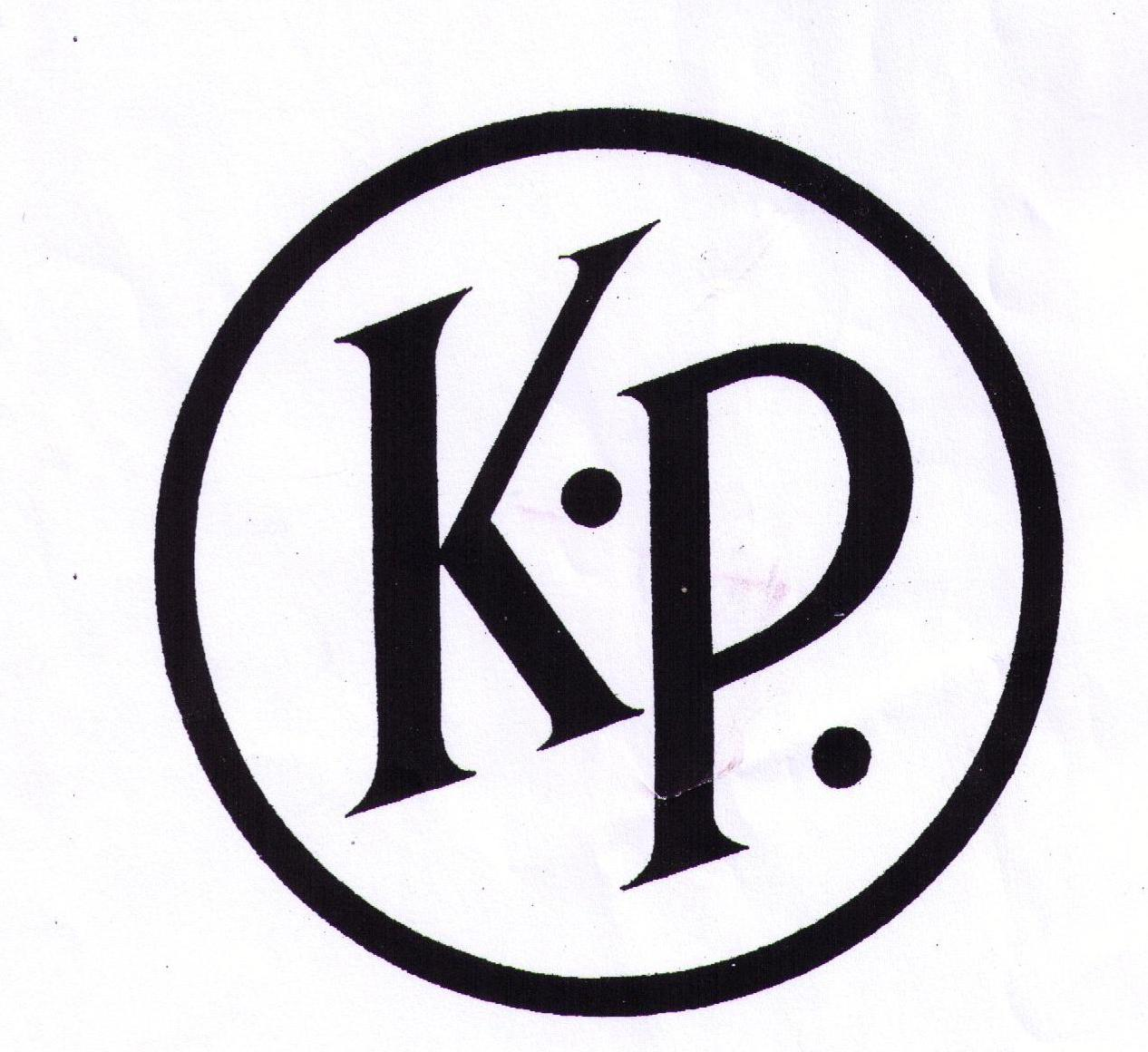
Logo

=== Kempthorne Prosser & Co's New Zealand Drug Company ===
Kempthorne Prosser's Burnside Chemical Works that made fertilisers from sulphuric acid opened in 1881 and were the first of its kind in the colony. It closed in the early 1960s and was sold to Dominion Fertiliser before being demolished.

=== New Zealand Refrigerating Company ===
Burnside is the site of the former Burnside Freezing Works of New Zealand Refrigerating Company, the first works of its kind in New Zealand. This large complex has its origin in a plant opened in 1881, and an abattoir continued to operate at this site until 2008.

Plans from 2009 to turn the site into an industrial city are yet (as of 2021) to come to fruition.

=== Otago Iron Rolling Mills ===
Previously Smellie Brothers' Iron Rolling Mills. The rolled metal was manufactured from scrap iron. Heated to a white-hot mass before being put under a steam hammer the metal was then rolled and converted to square, angle, flat, rolled and standard iron sold to wholesale merchants throughout the country.

=== Other industries ===
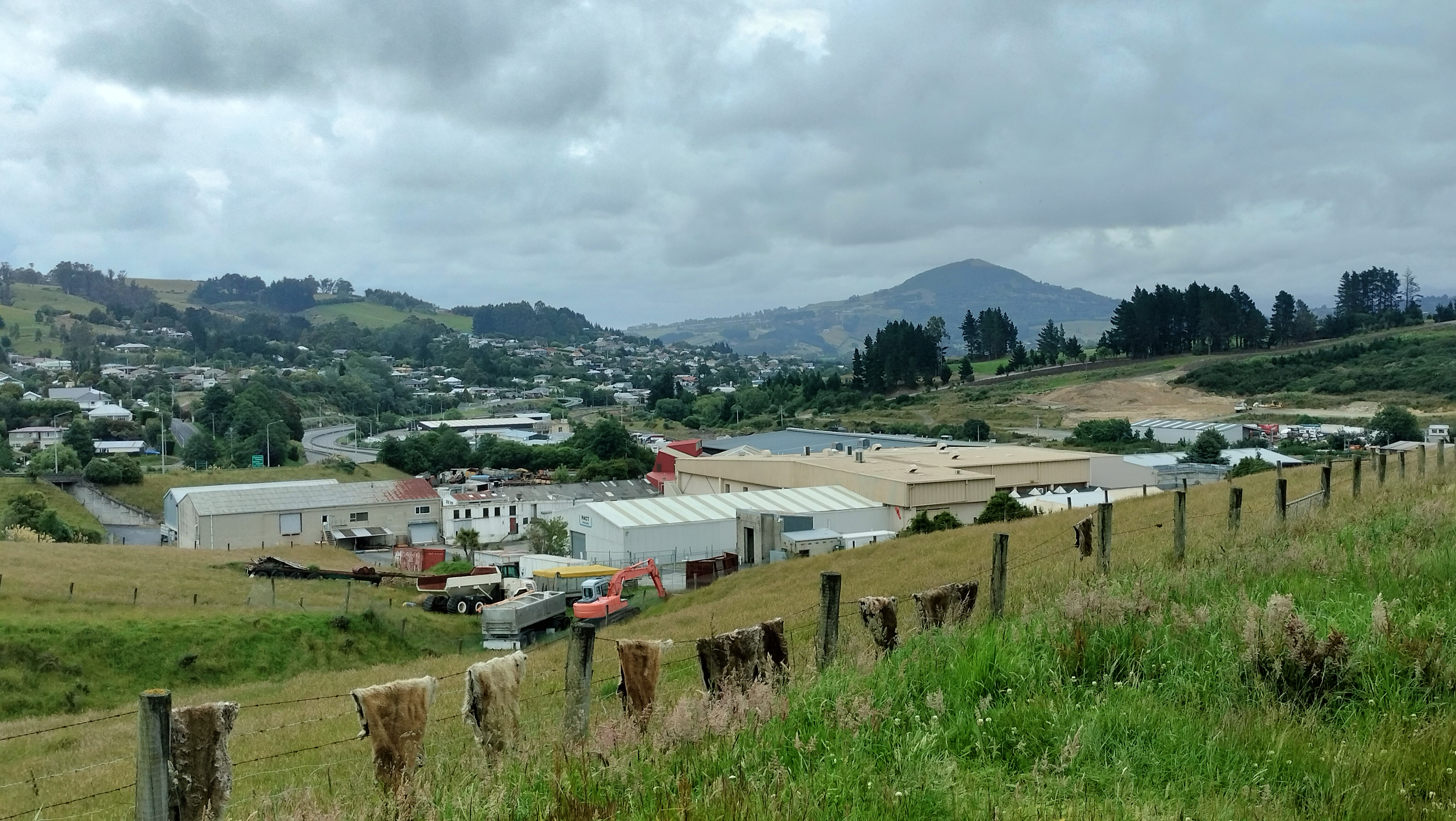
A landscape shot of factories and warehouses in Burnside

A tannery, flour mill, and several fellmongeries.

Another former landmark industry in the area was the Burnside Cement Factory, which also operated until the 1980s. A warehouse for a fire manufacturer was built on the site in 2018.

Among other industries in the area are numerous small manufacturing plants and wholesalers, and several car sales yards, all in lower Kaikorai Valley Road.

To its west and northwest Burnside is predominantly rural hillsides which contain one of the city's main reservoirs, the Southern Reservoir, which is stocked with rainbow trout.

Burnside's location means that there are several major transport routes associated with it. A large motorway interchange lies in Burnside, with slip roads from the Dunedin Southern Motorway to Green Island and the Kaikorai Valley, as well as routes connecting the motorway and Kaikorai Valley with Concord and the southwestern hill suburb of Corstorphine. The South Island Main Trunk railway passes through Burnside (though there are no longer passenger stations in the suburb) entering a tunnel which runs beneath Lookout Point, emerging in Caversham, New Zealand.

== Demographics ==
Historical population
Year	Pop.	±% p.a.
2006	108	—
2013	123	+1.88%
2018	141	+2.77%

Burnside covers 1.92 km^{2} (0.74 sq mi), and is part of the larger Kaikorai-Bradford statistical area statistical area. It had a population of 141 at the 2018 New Zealand census, an increase of 18 people (14.6%) since the 2013 census, and an increase of 33 people (30.6%) since the 2006 census. There were 48 households. There were 75 males and 66 females, giving a sex ratio of 1.14 males per female. The median age was 33 years (compared with 37.4 years nationally), with 27 people (19.1%) aged under 15 years, 36 (25.5%) aged 15 to 29, 63 (44.7%) aged 30 to 64, and 12 (8.5%) aged 65 or older.

Ethnicities were 83.0% European/Pākehā, 17.0% Māori, 6.4% Pacific peoples, 6.4% Asian, and 2.1% other ethnicities (totals add to more than 100% since people could identify with multiple ethnicities).

Although some people objected to giving their religion, 66.0% had no religion, 17.0% were Christian, 4.3% were Hindu, 2.1% were Buddhist and 4.3% had other religions.

Of those at least 15 years old, 18 (15.8%) people had a bachelor or higher degree, and 24 (21.1%) people had no formal qualifications. The median income was $34,100, compared with $31,800 nationally. The employment status of those at least 15 was that 72 (63.2%) people were employed full-time, 15 (13.2%) were part-time, and 3 (2.6%) were unemployed.
