= Calton Hill, New Zealand =

Suburb of Dunedin, New Zealand

Calton Hill
- Suburb
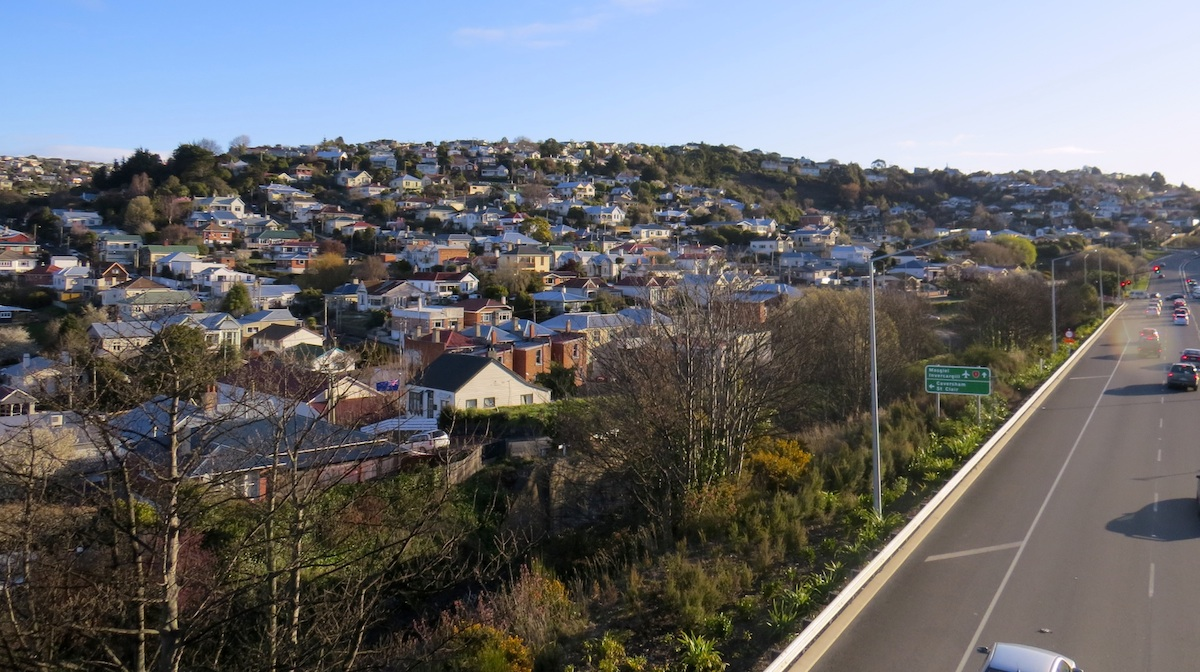
- Calton Hill, viewed from above the Dunedin Southern Motorway
- Interactive map of Calton Hill
- Coordinates: 45°54′0″S 170°28′15″E
- Country: New Zealand
- City: Dunedin
- Established: 1900s

Area
  - Land: 66 ha (160 acres)

Population (June 2025)
  - Total: 1,530
  - Density: 2,300/km^{2} (6,000/sq mi)

Lookout Point	Balaclava	Maryhill
Burnside	Calton Hill	Caversham
Concord	Corstorphine	Kew

Calton Hill is an elevated southern residential suburb of the city of Dunedin in New Zealand's South Island. The suburb is named after Calton Hill in Edinburgh, Scotland, and some of its street names carry similar etymological roots.

The suburb was established in the 1900s, as part of the second wave of suburban development in Dunedin. The parent suburb is Caversham, one of Dunedin's (and New Zealand's) oldest suburbs, established two generations prior as part of the first wave of settlement of the area. During the first wave of settlement before Calton Hill was established, it is unclear what modern day Calton Hill was called; possibilities include Caversham Hills or, more informally, John Sidey's farm.

Calton Hill is the geographical area bounded by: the Dunedin Southern Motorway to the north and the Caversham Valley Forest Reserve beyond; farmland in the south and west that borders Concord and the Burnside industrial area; and an arbitrary eastern border of Corstorphine Road, Sidey Street, Cole Street and South Road (where it terminates near the Dunedin Southern Motorway). The South Island Main Trunk railway and the motorway (part of State Highway 1) further distinguish its northern border.

From many places on the northern and eastern slopes, Calton Hill has views to Mt Cargill (Kapukataumahaka) and Flagstaff (Te Whanaupaki) in the north and the Pacific Ocean in the south-east. To the east, Calton Hill looks over the central plains of Dunedin city with Signal Hill (Te Pahuri o te Rangipohika), the Otago Harbour and Otago Peninsula in the distance. From the western slopes, the Kaikorai Valley and Green Island are in immediate view with Saddle Hill and the Taieri Plains beyond.

== Geography ==
The heart of Dunedin City is a central plain surrounded by hills, the remnants of a long-extinct volcano. Calton Hill lies around 6 km (3.7 mi) to the southwest of the city centre (The Octagon); line of sight with Calton Hill from the Octagon is obscured by a large hill spur heading east from the main ridge line that forms the western edge of central Dunedin. Looking up and to the west from the southern end of Dunedin's central plain, Calton Hill is the most northern prominence.

Calton Hill has a crowning northerly ridge with two high points, bookended by the upper section of Corstorphine Valley in the south and Lookout Point saddle in the north. Two north-northeast running spurs and slopes drop down from this ridge into the upper reaches of the Caversham Valley. Between these two spurs lies a north-facing bowl. To the southwest, the hill's slopes meet farmland bordering Burnside and Concord. The majority of the suburb is between 60 and 130 m above sea level.

=== Surrounding areas ===
Calton Hill shares its immediate borders with suburbs of Corstorphine, Concord and Burnside (separated by farmland), and Caversham and Maryhill (separated by partially forested, partially populated south facing hill slopes of the Caversham Valley). Calton Hill also shares borders with the small suburb of Lookout Point to the north. The 3.4-hectare (8.4-acre) Caversham Valley Forest Reserve is located as part of this area. Purchased by the Dunedin City Council in 1994 with the assistance of the Royal Forest and Bird Protection Society, it is home to various native bird and invertebrate species, including one species of velvet worm believed to be endemic to the Dunedin area.

Residential areas in New Zealand are often not clearly defined, and suburban boundaries often overlap and change depending on subjective understandings. It is unclear whether residents within the geographical area of Calton Hill identify with Calton Hill as the community they belong to, or Lookout Point, Caversham, or Corstophine.

== History ==
Prior to the arrival of humans to New Zealand, the area of Calton Hill was likely clothed in a dense and highly diverse mixed podocarp/broadleaf forest. Soil consisted largely of windblown loess over a weathered bedrock of sandstone covered by the Dunedin Volcanic Complex metamorphic processes.

=== Pre-colonial history ===
Approximately 800 years ago, Māori arrived on these islands. During the pre-colonial period mana whenua (territorial rights) over the Calton Hill area were held by three indigenous iwi (tribes), though there is no known archaeological evidence that shows direct residential occupation of Calton Hill itself. By the 19th century, two of these three iwi (Kāti Māmoe and Waitaha) had largely been subsumed by the largest, Kāi Tahu. The Calton Hill/Caversham Valley area was likely used as a thoroughfare south alongside coastal transportation provided by waka hourua (double hulled sailing canoes). Various areas may have been sites for nohoanga (temporary food gathering camps), gathering potable water, mahinga kai (food gathering area) for aruhe (bracken root) and ti kouka (cabbage tree), and for collecting other useful materials and resources.

There are only two surviving place names of the area to suggest it was an important area to the Māori. The bordering saddle of Lookout Point was named Koranga-a-runga-te-raki after Kāti Māmoe late 18th century chief Te Raki Ihia, who was largely responsible for joining the Kāi Tahu and Kãti Māmoe iwi together. He was buried here so that "his spirit might see hence his old haunts to the southward." The ridge-line which runs from St Clair Beach to the Lookout Point saddle is known as Whakaherekau (possibly meaning "to make a conciliatory present"). This latter name may have been used by tangata whenua to name the entire area.

=== European colonisation ===
At the time of the Treaty of Waitangi being negotiated and signed in January and February 1840, Calton Hill was probably by then a mosaic of tussock grassland and bracken shrubland with pockets of podocarp and broadleaf forest in steep gullies. Botanical records indicate the Calton Hill area that once was covered in dense podocarp, broadleaf forest had been displaced by human-lit fires. In the years prior to this it is unlikely the area would have been used by the small number of Europeans who inhabited the country.

From 1844 to 1863 Ngāi Tahu sold their lands to the Crown in a series of nine purchases. Calton Hill was 200 acres of a total of 400,000 acres (160,000 hectares) that made up the Otago Purchase, completed on 31 July 1844. The Crown reimbursed just £2,400 to local chiefs. In 1848, the first colonist ships arrived in the Dunedin area.

In 1855 John Sidey purchased a large area of land stretching from the Caversham Hills (modern day Corstophine, Calton Hill) to Mount Grand/ Kaikorai Hill 4 km (2.5 mi) away above Kaikorai Valley. With the exception of steep, inaccessible gully areas, most other area would have been cleared, sown with exotic grass species, and fenced for cattle farming. A small number trees may have been harvested for building products and firewood. During this time, there was a non-shingled road that skirted the northern edge of Calton Hill and up the Caversham Valley and over the Lookout Point saddle.

In 1861, gold was discovered in Central Otago. Whilst hundreds of kilometres away, the northern edge of modern-day Calton Hill was a short stretch of the primary goldrush highway. Thousands of people began trekking past with their swags following the Caversham Valley as the only road south to the diggings of the Otago gold rush. John Sidey would supply the miners with meat from his farm and other carted supplies.

Now, the area has two railway lines that have been tunnelled through the sandstone beneath. One is no longer open for transport; the other remains part of the main south trunk line. The first tunnel was established in December 1873. The second completed in 1910, the tunnels provided a transport link to and from the city and other urban areas of Dunedin until the 1960s. The Caversham railway station, only 10 to 15 minutes walk from any part of Calton Hill, was the nearest station. In addition to the railway line, between 1880 and 1940, residents could also use the Dunedin cable tramway system. The nearest station was also at Caversham.

=== The twentieth century ===
The first published mention of the existence of Calton Hill is from 1907. The farmland was surveyed for the establishment of roads, related infrastructure and residential sections. The "Township of Calton Hill" was formally gazetted by the City of Dunedin 19 November 1907 with advertisements appearing in newspapers for "choice sections, view and sun, low prices". Bare land remained for much of the sections until the first houses were built immediately prior to World War I, with remaining farmland tendered for grazing.

A concentrated phase of building occurred during the 1950s and 1960s, completed through the Government's state housing scheme established 15–20 years previous. Mass public transport was being replaced by mass private transport; garages were retrofitted on older houses to store cars and the suburb's population increased. Riselaw Road School was established in 1953 along with a community hall, play centre, and other facilities for children and families on the adjacent Riselaw Road site.

In September 2026 it was announced that streets in a new Calton Hill subdivision would be named after prominent Dunedin women, Rachel Reynolds (Rachel Reynolds Place), Doris Lusk (Lusk Lane), Ada Fache (Fache Lane), Elizabeth Hinds (Hinds Place) and Eileen Soper (Soper Close).

== Demographics ==
Calton Hill covers 0.66 km^{2} (0.25 sq mi) and had an estimated population of 1,530 as of June 2025, with a population density of 2,318 people per km^{2}.

Historical population
Year	Pop.	±% p.a.
2006	1,524	—
2013	1,434	−0.87%
2018	1,482	+0.66%

Calton Hill had a population of 1,482 at the 2018 New Zealand census, an increase of 48 people (3.3%) since the 2013 census, and a decrease of 42 people (−2.8%) since the 2006 census. There were 582 households, comprising 726 males and 753 females, giving a sex ratio of 0.96 males per female. The median age was 32.2 years (compared with 37.4 years nationally), with 342 people (23.1%) aged under 15 years, 351 (23.7%) aged 15 to 29, 681 (46.0%) aged 30 to 64, and 108 (7.3%) aged 65 or older.

Ethnicities were 84.0% European/Pākehā, 13.6% Māori, 7.5% Pasifika, 4.3% Asian, and 5.7% other ethnicities. People may identify with more than one ethnicity.

The percentage of people born overseas was 14.4, compared with 27.1% nationally.

Although some people chose not to answer the census's question about religious affiliation, 59.1% had no religion, 25.1% were Christian, 0.6% had Māori religious beliefs, 1.4% were Hindu, 1.6% were Muslim, 0.6% were Buddhist and 3.0% had other religions.

Of those at least 15 years old, 189 (16.6%) people had a bachelor's or higher degree, and 219 (19.2%) people had no formal qualifications. The median income was $28,000, compared with $31,800 nationally. 78 people (6.8%) earned over $70,000 compared to 17.2% nationally. The employment status of those at least 15 was that 582 (51.1%) people were employed full-time, 174 (15.3%) were part-time, and 63 (5.5%) were unemployed.

A high proportion of Calton Hill residents are of low socio-economic status compared to those of other suburbs of Dunedin, with a significant proportion of the households being in the Riselaw Road state-owned housing areas built during the 1950s and 1960s.

== Governance ==
Calton Hill falls within Dunedin City and is under the governance of Dunedin City Council and the Otago Regional Council. The area is not represented by any of Dunedin's six community boards, but is solely part of the greater area of the city of Dunedin. Public health services are under the management of the Southern District Health Board. Indigenous governance of Calton Hill falls within the takiwa of the Otakou Runaka, one of the 18 hapū of the Kāi Tahu iwi.

Nationally, Calton Hill falls within the Taieri electorate. As of 2022, the MP for Taieri is Ingrid Leary (Labour). Calton Hill is also part of Te Tai Tonga electorate, one of the country's seven Māori seats.

== Infrastructure and schools ==
Community facilities include two public bus services, Calton Hill Community Hall, the Dunedin Public Library Book bus (which visits the suburb once a week), two children's playground areas, and sports fields alongside the primary school. Potential public recreation areas lie to the north with a forest reserve, and to the south with underutilised sports grounds and bordering farmland. The closest commercial/retail area is in South Road, Caversham. Residents are serviced by two retail food businesses on opposite ends of Riselaw Road. There are a few home-based businesses, but the area is primarily residential.

Originally Riselaw Road School was a hub for the community. Now, the local primary school has been amalgamated and renamed as Carisbrook School Heights Site. It has two classes on its roll. In 2020 it is now Southern Health School. Adjacent to the school is the Riselaw Road Playcentre. The nearest secondary schools are Queen's High School and King's High School located in Forbury, 2–3 km to the south on the boundary between South Dunedin and St Kilda.
