= Pat Harrison (educationalist) =

New Zealand educationalist (1932–2025)

Dame Pat Harrison DNZM QSO

Principal of Queen's High School
- In office 1974–1994

Personal details
- Born: Patricia Mary Thomson; 6 September 1932 Dunedin, New Zealand
- Died: 6 September 2025 (aged 93) Dunedin, New Zealand
- Spouse: Arthur Keith Harrison (m. 1957; died 2022)
- Children: 3

Dame Patricia Mary Harrison DNZM QSO (née Thomson; 6 September 1932 – 6 September 2025) was a New Zealand educationalist.

== Background ==
Born in Dunedin on 6 September 1932, Harrison was educated at Otago Girls' High School from 1946 to 1950. She went on to study at Dunedin Teachers' College and the University of Otago, graduating with a Master of Arts degree with second-class honours in 1957.

In 1957, she married Arthur Keith Harrison, and the couple went on to have three children.

Pat Harrison died at Dunedin Hospital on 6 September 2025, at the age of 93.

== Education career ==
In 1955, Harrison's first teaching post was at Queen's High School, Dunedin, where she became interested in students with special needs. All of her teaching career, apart from three years in Christchurch, was spent in South Dunedin, and she served as principal of Queen's High School, Dunedin from 1975 to 1994.

== Community involvement ==
After her retirement, Harrison continued working with young people in Dunedin, helping the vulnerable and those who drop out of formal education, through programmes run by various community organisations including the Otago Youth Wellness Trust, which she founded in 1996.

Between 1983 and 1994, Harrison was a member of the University of Otago Council. She also served as a member of the Otago Regional Council. Other community roles included being an executive member of the Dunedin Council of Social Services, and chair of the Otago Regional Access Employment Council.

== Honours and awards ==
In the 1987 Queen's Birthday Honours, Harrison was appointed a Companion of the Queen's Service Order for public services. In 1990, she received the New Zealand 1990 Commemoration Medal, and in 1993 she was awarded the New Zealand Suffrage Centennial Medal. She was made a Distinguished Companion of the New Zealand Order of Merit, for services to education and the community, in the 2001 Queen's Birthday Honours, and following the restoration of titular honours by the New Zealand government in 2009, she accepted redesignation as a Dame Companion of the New Zealand Order of Merit.
