= Balaclava School =

Location
- 2 Mercer Street; Dunedin, Otago; New Zealand; 45.8886°S 170.4672°E

Information
- Type: Co-educational, Primary
- Established: 1964; 62 years ago
- Ministry of Education Institution no.: 3709
- Principal: Gary Marsh
- Enrolment: 252 (July 2026)
- Website: www.balaclava.school.nz

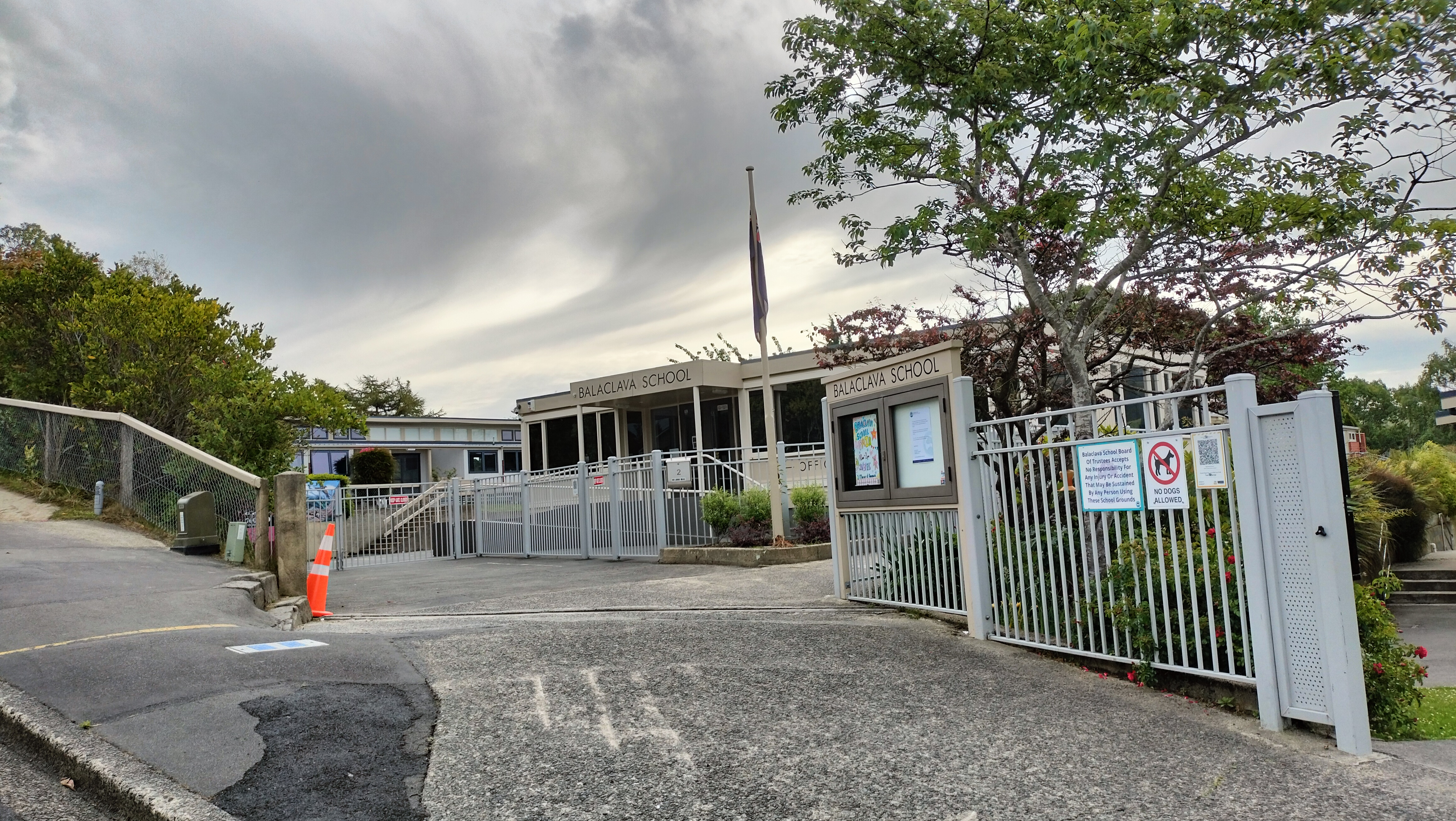
Entrance of Balaclava School

Balaclava School is a co-educational primary school, situated in the suburb of Balaclava in the city of Dunedin, New Zealand. The school first opened in 1964, and serves years 1 to 6, with a roll of 251 students.

== Vision and values ==
Balaclava School's primary vision is to foster and create a supportive space for students to develop a lifelong love for learning and reach their full potential.

=== BVA ===
Balaclava School's school culture is based around the abbreviation BVA (Building Values and Achievement). Through the emphasis of BVA, students can develop a strong sense of encouragement and wellbeing, to help facilitate the next step in their education.

=== GRIT ===
The acronym GRIT (Growth Mindset, Respect, Integrity, and Thrive), is geared towards promoting a growth mindset for students, as well as encouraging students to embrace challenges and develop resilience.

== Facilities ==
The school campus consists of 11 classrooms, with various play areas in between certain classrooms. Other facilities include, a library, a tennis court, a garden area, a wooden castle fort and a vast football field, nicknamed by the students at the school, "The footy field".

=== Treehouse ===
In 2020, two pupils: Bonnie Wilson and Gretel Calvert drafted a concept of a treehouse they wanted to design for Balaclava School. The treehouse designed features a tube slide, a climbing wall, a fireman’s pole and a large game of noughts and crosses.

The school encouraged its pupils to do a design challenge for a piece of children's play equipment, which they believed the school was lacking. After the senior leadership team inspected all the submitted designs, Bonnie and Gretel's design was chosen as the selected design. Their design was selected because of its features and since it utilized a mature tree in the forest area of the school grounds.

On the 18th of April 2021, after $50,000 was raised for the project, the treehouse was officially opened to the pupils of Balaclava by Bonnie and Gretel.

== See also ==
- List of schools in Otago
- Maryhill, New Zealand
