= Eileen Soper (New Zealand journalist) =

New Zealand journalist, writer and Girl Guide Commissioner

Eileen Louise Soper (née Service, 14 December 1900 – 24 October 1989) was a New Zealand journalist, writer and Girl Guide Commissioner. She was born in Sydney, New South Wales, Australia, in 1900.

As an adult, she was active in the cultural life of Dunedin. She worked as an editor of the Otago Daily Times under her maiden name, Eileen Service. She became an associate editor for the Otago Witness, where she wrote for the children's pages as Dot of 'Dot's Little Folk' until 1932. She married a chemistry professor from the University of Otago, Frederick George Soper, in 1938, with whom she traveled extensively overseas. After 1946, she dedicated herself to writing.

In September 2026 it was announced that a new street in the Dunedin suburb of Calton Hill would be named Soper Closer in Soper's honour.
