= New Zealand Refrigerating Company =

New Zealand meat export company

New Zealand Refrigerating Company Limited bought and absorbed by CMC in 1905
- Type: Public listed company
- Industry: Meat export
- Founded: 19 August 1881; 145 years ago in Dunedin, New Zealand
- Founder: Committee chaired by John Roberts
- Defunct: 1 May 1905 and then operated by CMC
- Fate: purchased and absorbed by Christchurch Meat Company Limited
- Headquarters: Burnside, Dunedin, New Zealand
- Areas served: New Zealand, United Kingdom
- Products: Fresh and frozen lamb, beef and meat of other animals, offals and the by-products

New Zealand Refrigerating Company Limited formerly Christchurch Meat Company Limited renamed Waitaki International Limited
- Industry: Meat export
- Founded: 7 January 1889; 137 years ago in Christchurch, New Zealand
- Founder: John Cooke (1852–1917)
- Defunct: 15 December 2015 Waitaki International Limited
- Headquarters: Islington, Christchurch, New Zealand
- Areas served: New Zealand, United Kingdom, United States
- Products: Fresh and frozen lamb, beef and meat of other animals, offals and the by-products

New Zealand Refrigerating Company Limited founded 1881 by a committee led by John Roberts killed New Zealand livestock at its Burnside Works built in 1883 in Green Island Dunedin, froze the carcasses and shipped them for wholesaling in Smithfield, London.

In 1905 Christchurch Meat Company of Islington bought New Zealand Refrigerating Company Limited and on 25 August 1916 Christchurch Meat Company took its subsidiary's name as its own.

The main New Zealand Refrigerating Company works at Islington near Christchurch was operated over the last quarter of the 20th century by the same company finally trading as Silver Fern Farms. The works closed in 2008.

The site in Islington was acquired early in the 21st century cleared and rebuilt as a business and industrial park, Waterloo Business Park, named after Waterloo Road on its eastern boundary.

== New Zealand Refrigerating Company ==
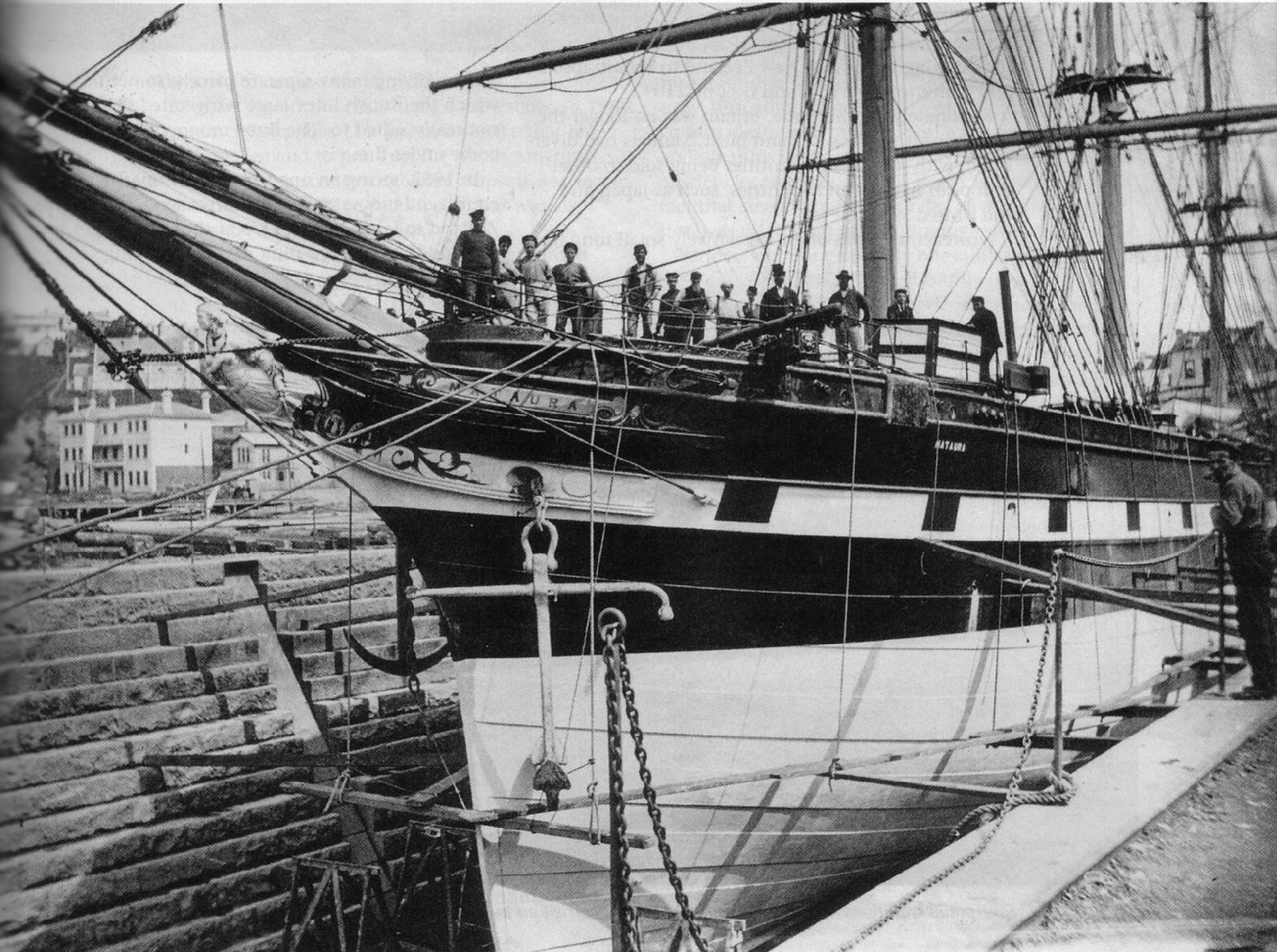
S S Mataura in dry dock

A committee was formed in Dunedin early in 1881 but it was not until New Zealand Shipping Company's steamer S S Mataura arrived over twelve months later that New Zealand Refrigerating Company directors: John Roberts, Edwin Spence and Alexander Begg took responsibility for overseeing the loading of freshly killed stock owned by runholders for freezing on board ship. As well as the 3,844 sheep, 6 bullocks and 77 sucking pigs the Mataura carried: hares, rabbits, fowls, ducks, barracudas, hapuka, pūkeko, frost fish, cheeses, hams and a cask of penguin skins. The New Zealand Refrigerating Company made a tiny profit but the shipping company's costs of the voyage exceeded their freight charge. The shippers on their own account were pleased with results but the overfat sheep were unsaleable.

=== Canterbury Meat Export Company ===
The Canterbury Meat Export Company from its canning works in remote Templeton (now Islington), Christchurch, pigs were brought in to dispose of the waste, made New Zealand's first meat exports in 1870. Defective tins, over-supply and a period when station-owners were unwilling to take the risk of having their own livestock canned led to the company's liquidation and the acquisition of the plant by the Bank of New Zealand. The plant was recommissioned in 1879

=== Canterbury Frozen Meat and Dairy Produce Company ===
In Christchurch John Cooke (1852–1917) formed The Canterbury Frozen Meat and Dairy Produce Company in March 1882. Cooke had acquired the Templeton works of Canterbury Meat Export and plant in Belfast. CFM did not take Templeton but bought some of the land at Belfast and a new freezing works at Belfast was in operation in February 1883.

== Canterbury Frozen Meat Company (later renamed New Zealand Refrigerating Company) ==
The old Templeton canning works long back in use became the site of a new Freezing work in 1889 erected by the newly formed Canterbury Frozen Meat Company, secretly promoted by John Cooke. The new company with its directors and shareholders almost entirely from Belfast Northern Ireland bought the farmers' livestock taking the risk of getting a good price in London. This arrangement had great appeal for small farmers. The trade became established but unregulated shipments created shortages and gluts on the British market and farmers who shipped on their own account found it difficult to check on the activities of possibly unscrupulous buyers.

== Canterbury Lamb ==
This is the company that established the reputation of Canterbury lamb in Britain.

== Killing capacity ==
Advertised daily killing capacity in 1927:

Sheep and lambs

- 7,000 Islington
- 6,000 Smithfield
- 6,000 Imlay
- 2,000 Picton
- 3,500 Burnside

Cattle

- 50 Islington
- 50 Smithfield
- 200 Imlay
- 30 Picton
- 50 Burnside

== Businesses bought by CMC / NZR ==
Year founded and year bought by Christchurch Meat Company / New Zealand Refrigerating Company

- Christchurch Meat Company Islington

1882 New Zealand Refrigerating Company, Burnside 1905
1885 South Canterbury Refrigerating Company, Smithfield 1895
1881 Towers & Company London 1915
1891 Wanganui Meat Freezing Company, Castlecliff 1926 (and closed)
1891 Nelson Brothers (London), Blenheim 1897
1897 Wairau Freezing Company, Spring Creek 1899

25 August 1916 Christchurch Meat Company changed its name to The New Zealand Refrigerating Company Limited

- New Zealand Refrigerating Company Islington

1916 New Zealand Refrigerating Company, Imlay
1924 G B Field & Company, London 1930
1958 New Zealand Meat Packers Wanganui 1964

== Sold ==
1914 Christchurch Meat Company, Pukeuri 1922 Waitaki Farmers Freezing Company

Christchurch Meat Company Pukeuri near Oamaru 5 Mark 1914 taken over by Waitaki Farmers Freezing Company in 1922
