= Concord, New Zealand =

Concord
- Suburb
- Interactive map of Concord
- Coordinates: 45.902°S 170.457°E
- Country: New Zealand
- City: Dunedin
- Local authority: Dunedin City Council

Area
  - Land: 116 ha (290 acres)

Population (June 2025)
  - Total: 1,510
  - Density: 1,300/km^{2} (3,370/sq mi)

	Burnside
Green Island	Concord	Calton Hill
		Corstorphine

Concord is a small residential suburb of the New Zealand city of Dunedin. It is southwest of the city centre. It lay on State Highway 1 until the construction of the Dunedin Southern Motorway in the 1990s, but is now bypassed by traffic from central Dunedin. The former Main South Road is now largely reduced to a narrow one-way street leading down from Lookout Point, virtually a long slip-road from the start of the motorway, though it is still two-way through Concord itself, and serves (along with Stevenson Road, which it becomes) as an important link road to Corstorphine and Calton Hill.

== Demographics ==
Concord covers 1.16 km^{2} (0.45 sq mi) and had an estimated population of 1,510 as of June 2025, with a population density of 1,302 people per km^{2}.

Historical population
Year	Pop.	±% p.a.
2006	1,485	—
2013	1,464	−0.20%
2018	1,512	+0.65%

Concord had a population of 1,512 at the 2018 New Zealand census, an increase of 48 people (3.3%) since the 2013 census, and an increase of 27 people (1.8%) since the 2006 census. There were 564 households, comprising 765 males and 747 females, giving a sex ratio of 1.02 males per female. The median age was 35.7 years (compared with 37.4 years nationally), with 312 people (20.6%) aged under 15 years, 297 (19.6%) aged 15 to 29, 708 (46.8%) aged 30 to 64, and 198 (13.1%) aged 65 or older.

Ethnicities were 88.1% European/Pākehā, 12.3% Māori, 5.8% Pasifika, 2.8% Asian, and 4.0% other ethnicities. People may identify with more than one ethnicity.

The percentage of people born overseas was 9.9, compared with 27.1% nationally.

Although some people chose not to answer the census's question about religious affiliation, 59.1% had no religion, 30.6% were Christian, 0.4% had Māori religious beliefs, 0.6% were Hindu, 2.0% were Muslim, 0.2% were Buddhist and 0.8% had other religions.

Of those at least 15 years old, 162 (13.5%) people had a bachelor's or higher degree, and 285 (23.8%) people had no formal qualifications. The median income was $29,300, compared with $31,800 nationally. 117 people (9.8%) earned over $70,000 compared to 17.2% nationally. The employment status of those at least 15 was that 618 (51.5%) people were employed full-time, 180 (15.0%) were part-time, and 48 (4.0%) were unemployed.

== Education ==
Concord School is a state contributing primary school for Year 1 to 6 students, with a roll of 54 students as of March 2026. It was established in 1914.
