= Caroline Valpy =

New Zealand artist

- Born: Caroline Penelope Jeffreys; 1804; Kanpur, India
- Died: 30 October 1884 (aged 79–80); Mornington, Dunedin, New Zealand
- Spouse: William Henry Valpy
- Children: Ellen Jeffreys, Catherine Fulton, Arabella Valpy, Juliet Valpy, William Henry Valpy Jr. and Caroline Hensley

Caroline Penelope Valpy (née Jeffreys; 1804 – 30 October 1884) was a British-New Zealand artist.

== Biography ==
Caroline Valpy (Note: Erroneously called Mrs Catherine Valpy in Platts (1980)) was born Caroline Penelope Jeffreys in Kanpur, India in 1804 to Reverend Richard Jeffreys, chaplain to the East India Company. She was sister to Reverend Charles Jeffreys. Valpy married William Henry Valpy in India. They had six children: Ellen Jeffreys, Catherine Fulton, Arabella Valpy, Juliet Valpy, William Henry Valpy, Jr. and Caroline Hensley.

They moved to England in 1837, before coming to Dunedin, New Zealand aboard the Ajax in 1849. They lived at Forbury, Dunedin, close to the current suburban road, Valpy Street.

Valpy and her daughters, especially Ellen, were known to be talented artists. They are described as having filled numerous notebooks with drawings and watercolours. Valpy's artwork is represented in the Otago Early Settlers' Association, Dunedin. Valpy's artwork, Early Dunedin 1851, is also recorded as being reproduced in a 1948 calendar for July/August 1948.

She died on 30 October 1884 in Mornington and is buried in Dunedin Southern Cemetery with her daughter Arabella Valpy and granddaughter, Jessie Mackworth.
