= Queen's High School, Dunedin =

Queen's High School

Location
- 195 Surrey Street; Saint Clair; Dunedin 9012; New Zealand; 45.903551°S 170.492071°E

Information
- Type: Girls' Secondary
- Motto: Latin: Amore Discimus Discendi Vivere (Through Love of Learning, We Learn to Live.)
- Established: 1955
- Ministry of Education Institution no.: 384
- Principal: Barbara Agnew
- Enrolment: 592 (July 2026)
- Socio-economic decile: 5M
- Website: queens.school.nz

Queen's High School is a state single-sex girls' secondary school in Dunedin.

It is located at the southern end of the city close to the boundary between the suburbs of St Clair and Forbury, next to the parallel single-sex boys' school, King's, with which it shares some facilities.

Pat Harrison (later Dame Pat) was principal of the school from 1975 to 1994.

Notable people associated with Queen's include ex-drama teacher Terry McTavish and alumna chemical engineer Gretchen Kivell.

== Enrolment ==
As of July 2026, the school has roll of 592 students, of which 149 (25.2%) identify as Māori.

As of 2026, the school has an Equity Index of 463, placing it amongst schools whose students have average socioeconomic barriers to achievement (roughly equivalent to decile 5 and 6 under the former socio-economic decile system).

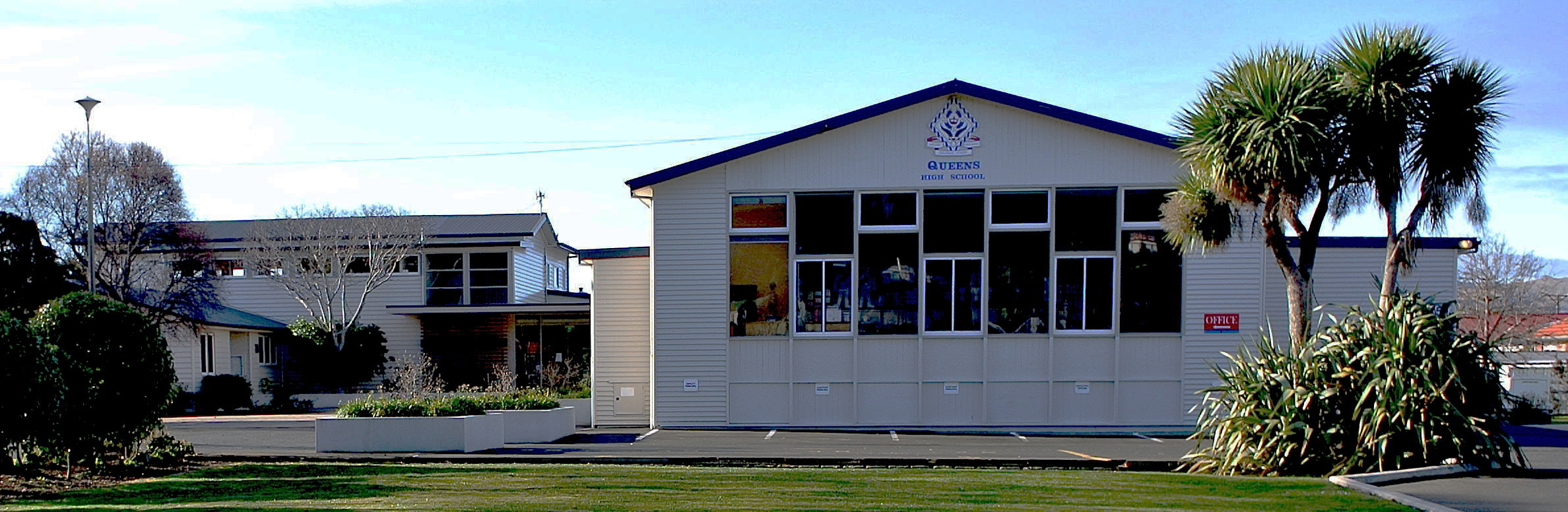
Main entrance at 195 Surrey Street
