= William Henry Valpy =

New Zealand settler

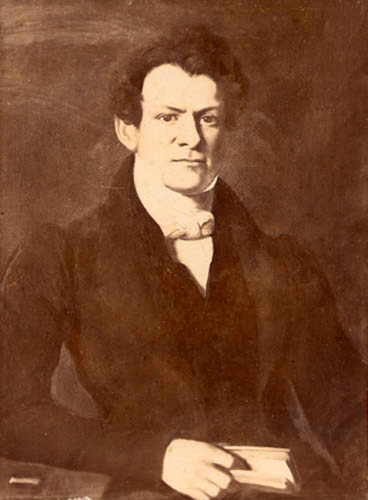
- Portrait of William Henry Valpy
- Born: 2 January 1793
- Died: 25 September 1852
- Spouse: Caroline Jeffreys (m. 1826)

William Henry Valpy (2 January 1793 – 25 September 1852) was a noted early settler of Dunedin, New Zealand. He is sometimes referred to locally as "The father of Saint Clair", as he was the first settler in the area now occupied by the suburb of Saint Clair.

Valpy was born in Reading, Berkshire, the son of English educationalist Richard Valpy and the younger brother of the English printer and publisher Abraham John Valpy. On 12 January 1810, Valpy petitioned the East India Company, with support from director William Astell, for admission to the East-India College with a view to obtaining a post with the Company in Bengal. In due course, Valpy was appointed a Magistrate & Collector. The responsibility of the role was the maintenance of law and order, and the collection of revenue. The role continues to exist in India in modified form as the District Magistrate.

Valpy married Caroline Jeffreys (born 1804 in Kolkata) in Kanpur on 1 May 1826.

Valpy's Magistrate & Collector posts included: Kalpi in 1835; Varanasi later that year, when he was selected to co-operate with the Rajah of Benares in settlement of revenues, and; Sarum in 1838, from whence he sought a salary increase which was not only declined, but also resulted in a reduction in his salary to 26,000 rupees.

He retired to England in 1836, but poor health prompted him to emigrate with his family to healthier climes. They arrived in the new settlement of Otago only one year after its founding, in January 1849. William and Caroline travelled with five of their six children: artist Ellen Penelope Valpy Jeffreys, Catherine Henrietta Elliot Valpy Fulton (who became a suffragist), Arabella Valpy (who was instrumental in bringing the Salvation Army to New Zealand), Juliet Valpy, and William. Their sixth child, Caroline, remained in England with her husband.

At the time he was regarded as the wealthiest man in the colony. Valpy was the first settler in the south Dunedin area, with two large farm properties he named "Caversham" and "The Forbury" after places connected with his family in and around the town of Reading, in the English county of Berkshire. The names still survive as the names of Dunedin's suburbs of Caversham and Forbury, and a road in the suburb of Saint Clair close to the former site of the Forbury estate buildings is named Valpy Street. These farms were important sources of employment for many of the new community, as was Valpy's construction of a road linking the properties with the heart of the city. This road formed the basis of several arterial routes still in use in Dunedin.

Valpy was heavily involved in local politics, though his Anglican English background came under strenuous attack from the Scottish Presbyterian community of early Dunedin. In May 1851, Valpy was invited by Sir George Grey to represent Otago in the original New Zealand Legislative Council. Following a numerously attended public meeting in opposition of Valpy accepting the invitation, Valpy declined. The strain of this conflict, along with Valpy's continuing poor health, took their toll, and Valpy died in Dunedin in September 1852, only three and a half years after he had arrived in New Zealand. Whilst his health had been delicate, his death on 25 September 1852 was unexpected. Just three days earlier, his daughters Juliet and Catherine had married at his homestead; the latter had married James Fulton. Caroline Valpy died on 30 October 1884 at Mornington, aged 80.
