= William Henry Valpy Jr. =

New Zealand settler (1832–1911)

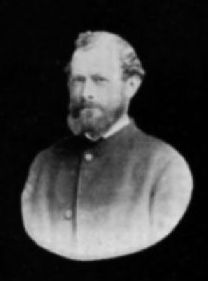
Portrait of William Henry Valpy Jr.

William Henry Valpy Jr. (8 January 1832 – 19 January 1911) was one of the earliest settlers of Otago, a province in the south of New Zealand.

Valpy was born in Calcutta. His father, William Henry Valpy, was a Magistrate & Collector for the East India Company. His mother was Caroline Valpy (née Jeffreys), a sister of Julius Jeffreys. Due to his father's precarious health, the family emigrated to New Zealand, where they arrived at Port Chalmers by the ship Ajax on 8 January 1849.

Prior to the family leaving England in 1847, Valpy Sr. had purchased land at the second or third balloting in London under the Otago Association. The family first settled at "The Forbury" by the Ocean Beach, now known as St Clair. Valpy Jr. was placed in charge of a sheep run at Waihola. In 1852, Valpy Jr. shipped the first fat stock sent by sea from Otago to Canterbury. After several weeks in Lyttelton, he and two shepherds returned to Otago on horseback in a 12-day journey, the first people to accomplish such a feat. His report to John Robert Godley of the feasibility of such an overland journey was published in the Lyttelton Times. During the same year Valpy Jr. moved to the Horseshoe Bush run, at the head of Lake Waihola, and in 1854, he took up the Maerewhenua station, in the Waitaki District in North Otago, and in 1856, purchased the Oamaru and Upper Taipo runs. Due to a severe accident, he was forced to sell his properties. Valpy Jr. then took up the Patearoa run, in the Upper Taieri, but sold it in 1860 to Dr. Buchanan. After that Valpy Jr. lived in retirement until 1874, when he was appointed Crown lands ranger for the northern portion of Otago, but retired from the position in 1888, when he and his family took up two runs at the head of Lake Wakatipu. They afterwards sold these properties. In the early 1860s, Valpy Jr. was made a justice of the peace, and he acted as Sergeant-at-Arms in the Otago Provincial Council, during the time that Julius Vogel was Provincial Treasurer.

Valpy married in 1858 to Penelope Caroline Every, the daughter of Simon Frederick Every, of Silver Acres, Andersons Bay, Dunedin. His wife was a descendant of the Every baronets. They had five sons and three daughters. His last residence was Kohimarama near Glenorchy at the head of Lake Wakatipu. He died on 19 January 1911 while he stayed at his son James' place in Oamaru; he had turned 79 only a few days earlier. His wife died in 1924 aged 84.
