= Corstorphine, New Zealand =

Suburb of Dunedin, New Zealand

Corstorphine
- Suburb
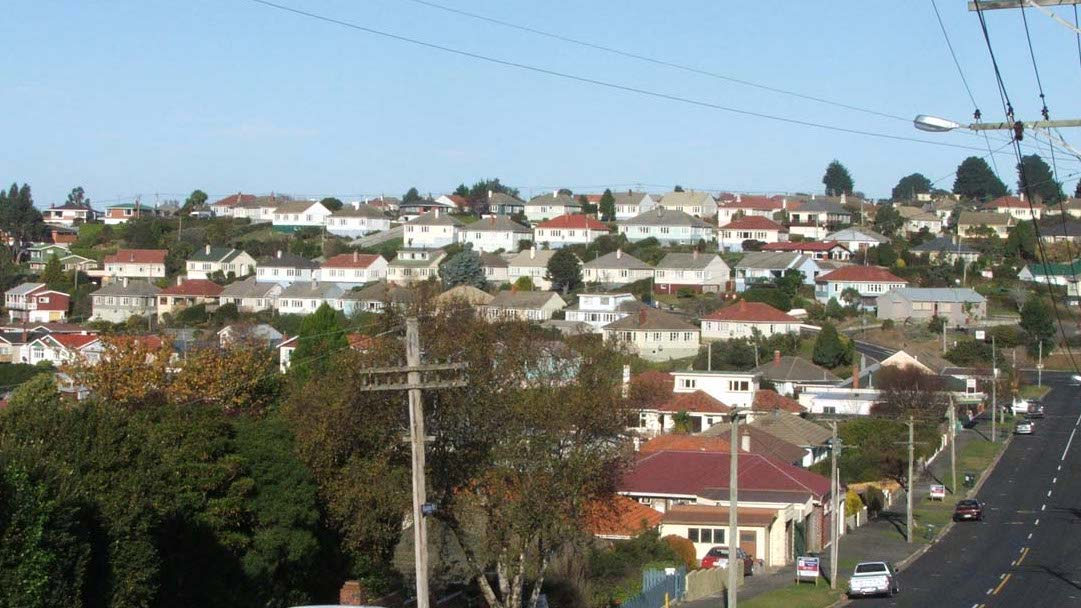
- State housing in Corstorphine
- Interactive map of Corstorphine
- Coordinates: 45.9045°S 170.4709°E
- Country: New Zealand
- City: Dunedin
- Local authority: Dunedin City Council

Area
  - Land: 157 ha (390 acres)

Population (June 2025)
  - Total: 3,880
  - Density: 2,470/km^{2} (6,400/sq mi)

Calton Hill	Caversham	Forbury
Concord	Corstorphine	St Kilda
		St Clair

Corstorphine is a suburb of southwest Dunedin in the South Island of New Zealand. It is located on the slopes of Calton Hill - a spur of Forbury Hill - between Caversham Valley and the Pacific Ocean. The suburbs of Saint Clair and Forbury lie to the east and south, and Caversham and Lookout Point lie to the north.

== Geography ==
Corstorphine is a largely residential suburb, containing a substantial amount of state housing built from the 1930s to the 1960s. Its main roads include Middleton Road, Sidey Street, Riselaw Road, and Corstorphine Road. A small group of shops is located at the top of Middleton Road.

To the west is largely rural land, connected via the rural Blackhead Road and Green Island Bush Road to Green Island and Waldronville. The popular Tunnel Beach lies 1.5 kilometres from the top of Middleton Road and is accessed via Blackhead Road. To the north of Corstorphine, the smaller suburb of Calton Hill connects Corstorphine with the upper Caversham Valley and Lookout Point by way of Riselaw Road.

== History ==
The name "Corstorphine" comes from the house and land owned by early settler John Sidey, who arrived in Dunedin in 1848. It originates from Corstorphine, a village near Edinburgh, though the names are pronounced differently (the Scottish village has the emphasis on the second syllable, rather than the first). Many of the streets in Corstorphine and Kew are named after places in Scotland, among them Skibo Street, Dornoch Street, and Lockerbie Street.

Sidey's son Sir Thomas became a prominent local and national politician during the later nineteenth century. Sidey's residence, Corstorphine House, was built in 1864 and was substantially extended in 1910. It is one of the suburb's main landmarks.

== Kew ==
On the lower slopes lies the smaller suburb of Kew. Here, Easther Crescent, named after the area's first house owner, a naval captain, runs along a terrace at the edge of the hill, connecting with Saint Clair at Allandale Road to the south and descending to Forbury Corner and Caversham in the north-east. Kew Park lies at Forbury Corner, a major suburban road junction, with the area immediately above it occasionally referred to as Kew Rise.

The suburb's name comes from the Kew Botanical Gardens in London. Built on part of Sidey's former farmland, the suburb was intended to be residential, and has no commercial premises.

== Demographics ==
Corstorphine (including Kew) covers 1.57 km^{2} (0.61 sq mi) and had an estimated population of 3,880 as of June 2025, with a population density of 2,471 people per km^{2}.

Historical population
Year	Pop.	±% p.a.
2006	3,357	—
2013	3,510	+0.64%
2018	3,618	+0.61%

Corstorphine had a population of 3,618 at the 2018 New Zealand census, an increase of 108 people (3.1%) since the 2013 census, and an increase of 261 people (7.8%) since the 2006 census. There were 1,515 households, comprising 1,716 males and 1,902 females, giving a sex ratio of 0.9 males per female, with 717 people (19.8%) aged under 15 years, 609 (16.8%) aged 15 to 29, 1,653 (45.7%) aged 30 to 64, and 648 (17.9%) aged 65 or older.

Ethnicities were 84.7% European/Pākehā, 10.4% Māori, 5.7% Pasifika, 7.4% Asian, and 3.2% other ethnicities. People may identify with more than one ethnicity.

The percentage of people born overseas was 19.0, compared with 27.1% nationally.

Although some people chose not to answer the census's question about religious affiliation, 52.5% had no religion, 35.2% were Christian, 0.4% had Māori religious beliefs, 0.7% were Hindu, 0.5% were Muslim, 1.0% were Buddhist and 2.2% had other religions.

Of those at least 15 years old, 768 (26.5%) people had a bachelor's or higher degree, and 573 (19.8%) people had no formal qualifications. 369 people (12.7%) earned over $70,000 compared to 17.2% nationally. The employment status of those at least 15 was that 1,299 (44.8%) people were employed full-time, 432 (14.9%) were part-time, and 108 (3.7%) were unemployed.

Individual statistical areas
Name	Area (km^{2})	Population	Density (per km^{2})	Households	Median age	Median income
Kew (Dunedin City)	0.71	1,734	2,442	732	41.8 years	$31,700
Corstorphine	0.87	1,884	2,166	783	37.7 years	$26,100
New Zealand					37.4 years	$31,800

== Education ==
Corstorphine School was a contributing primary school serving years 1 to 6, which opened in 1950 and closed in 2010 due to declining roll numbers. The site was sold in 2014.
