= Juliet Valpy =

New Zealand artist (1835–1911)

Juliet Anna Owen Valpy Mackworth (23 August 1835 – 9 April 1911) was a New Zealand artist, and one of six children of William Henry Valpy and Caroline Valpy (born Jeffreys), a pioneering family who arrived in Dunedin, New Zealand in January 1849 aboard the Ajax. She was born in Sikraul Varanasi, Uttar Pradesh, India, where her father was a judge.

She married William Mackworth at her parents' home The Forbury, Dunedin, on 22 September 1852, in a double wedding with her sister Catherine, who was marrying James Fulton. Three days after the wedding, their father unexpectedly died. Mackworth and Valpy had a daughter, Wilhelmina, but Mackworth died while she was an infant. Valpy married Bayly Pike, and had four children with him.

Her watercolour paintings survive in the Hocken Collections.
