= Richard Valpy =

18th/19th-century English academic and priest

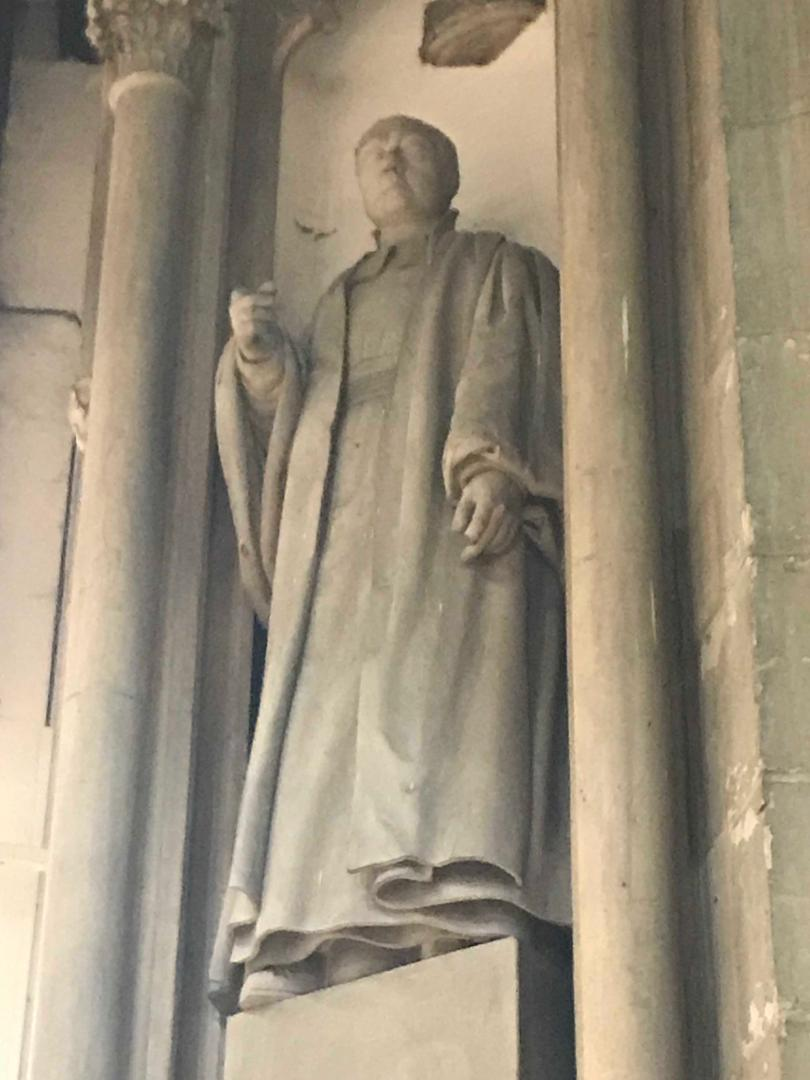
Valpy by Samuel Dixon, St Laurence's Church, Reading (Roche Abbey stone)

Richard Valpy (7 December 1754 – 28 March 1836) was a British schoolmaster and priest of the Church of England. He is best known as the head master of Reading Grammar School, in the town of Reading, England.

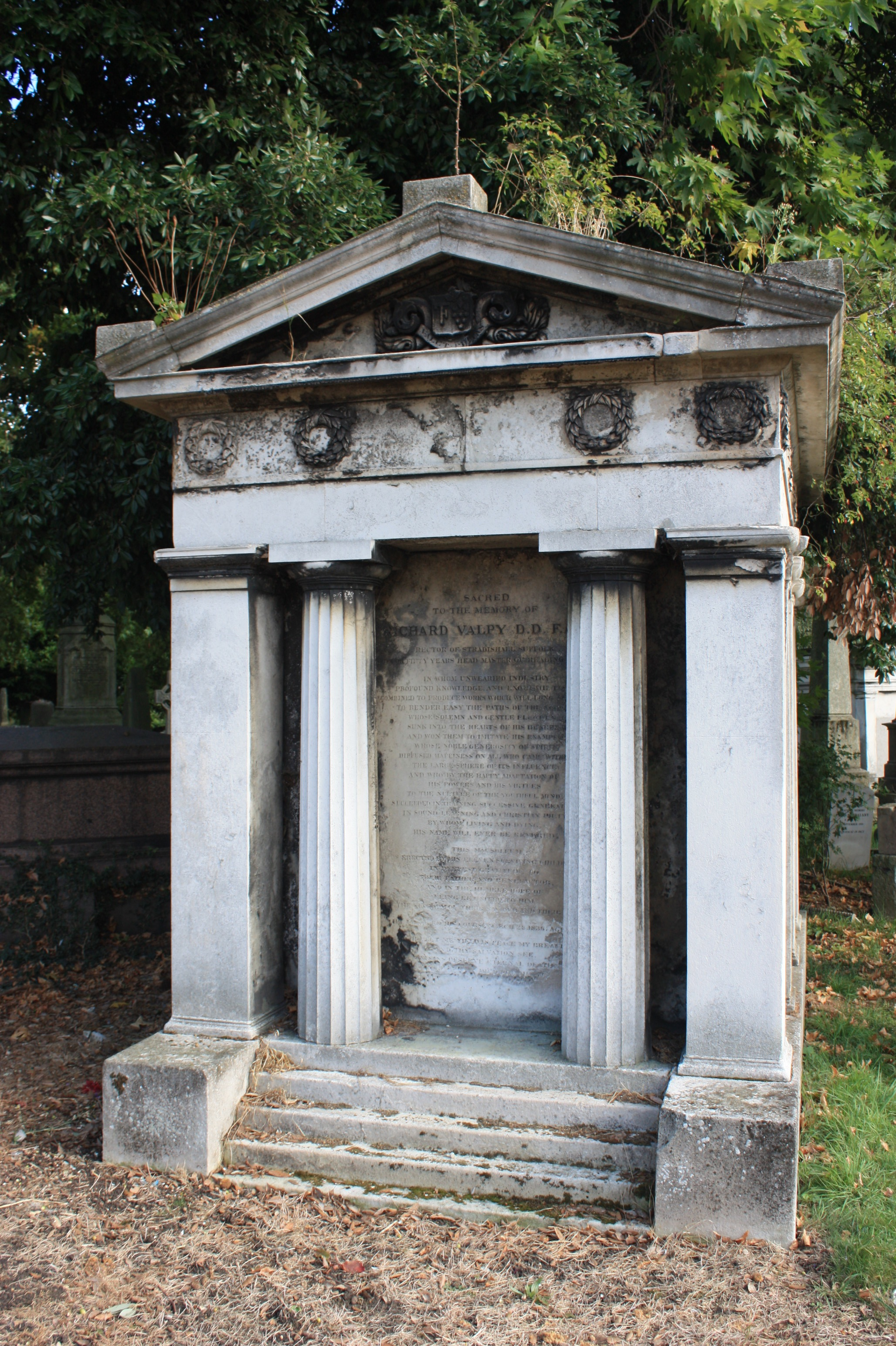
Valpy's tomb at Kensal Green Cemetery

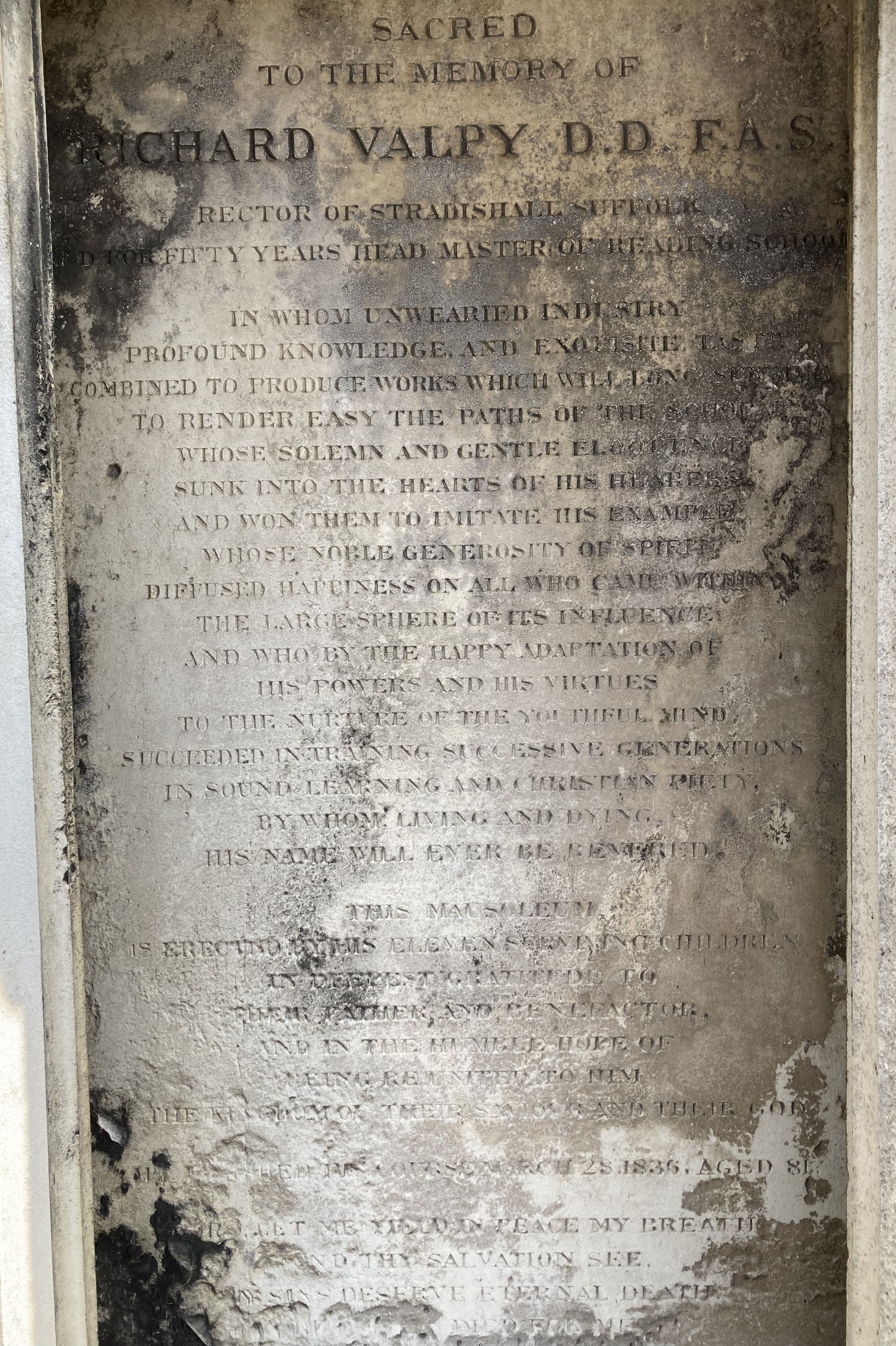
Epitaph on the Valpy's grave

== Life and career ==
Valpy was born the eldest son of Richard and Catherine Valpy in Jersey. He was sent to schools in Normandy and Southampton and completed his education at Pembroke College, Oxford. In 1777 he was ordained. After holding a mastership at Bury, in 1781 he became head master of Reading School, a post which he held for 50 years. From 1787 he held also the rectory of Stradishall, Suffolk. During the early part of Valpy's long head-mastership the school flourished greatly. At least 120 boys attended it.

He was the author of Greek and Latin grammars which enjoyed a large circulation. His Greek Delectus and Latin Delectus were long familiar to public school boys. He is said to have been a mighty flogger, and to have refused two bishoprics. In 1800 he was requested by his old pupils to sit for a full-length portrait and 30 years later, on the occasion of his jubilee, he was presented with a service of plate. Mary Russell Mitford spoken of him as vainer than a peacock.

The school was declining before Valpy's long reign closed. His successor was his son, Francis Valpy (1797–1882), appointed in 1830. Richard Valpy died in London. He is buried in a mausoleum in front of the main chapel in Kensal Green Cemetery.

A statue was erected in Reading's St Lawrence's Church to commemorate him. Valpy Street, in Reading town centre and adjacent to the then site of Reading Grammar School, is named after him.

His brother Edward Valpy was an English cleric, classical scholar and schoolteacher, and he was the father of printer and publisher Abraham John Valpy and of New Zealand pioneer William Henry Valpy.

== Bowdlerisation ==
"The Second part of King Henry the Fourth, altered from William Shakespeare as it was acted at Reading School in October 1801. Published as it was performed for the benefit of the Humane Society" By Richard Valpy.

"WHEN the First Part of King Henry the Fourth was played at Reading School, it was sufficient to curtail some tedious pages, and to omit some exceptionable expressions. In the Second Part it was absolutely necessary to do more. This Play in the original is disfigured not only with indelicate speeches, but with characters that cannot now be tolerated on a public theatre."

== Sources ==
- Chisholm, Hugh, ed. (1911). "Valpy, Richard" . Encyclopædia Britannica. Vol. 27 (11th ed.). Cambridge University Press. pp. 865–866.
- Lee, Sidney, ed. (1899). "Valpy, Richard" . Dictionary of National Biography. Vol. 58. London: Smith, Elder & Co.
- "The Town of Reading during the early part of the Nineteenth century", (1910). By W. M. Childs, M.A., Principal of University College, Reading. (Available online The Town of Reading during the early part of the Nineteenth century )
