= Maryhill, New Zealand =

Suburb of Dunedin, New Zealand

Maryhill
- Suburb
- Interactive map of Maryhill
- Coordinates: 45.8884°S 170.4794°E
- Country: New Zealand
- City: Dunedin
- Local authority: Dunedin City Council

Area
  - Land: 124 ha (310 acres)

Population (June 2025)
  - Total: 2,300
  - Density: 1,900/km^{2} (4,800/sq mi)

Kenmure	Mornington	City Rise
Kaikorai Valley	Maryhill	Kensington
Calton Hill	Caversham	South Dunedin

Maryhill is a residential suburb of the New Zealand city of Dunedin. It is located on a ridge to the southwest of the central city between the suburbs of Mornington, Kenmure, and Caversham. The smaller suburb of Balaclava lies immediately to its west. Maryhill is believed to take its name from a district in the city of Glasgow in Scotland, where many of the early settlers of the suburb originated. In this regard it is unusual among Dunedin suburbs, many of which are named for suburbs of Edinburgh - Maryhill and the nearby Little Paisley are the only suburbs named for Glaswegian locations, and the latter is an old name rarely used today. A second theory is that Maryhill was named in honour of Mary, the wife of early Dunedin settler John Bathgate.

The main road in Maryhill is Glenpark Avenue, which runs south from a series of small streets which connect it with Mailer Street Mornington. At its southern end, it links with a tortuous zig-zag road, Lancefield Street, which leads to the suburb of Caversham. Several roads cross Glenpark Avenue; notable among them are Maryhill Terrace and Glen Road. These connect with Caversham at The Glen, in Maryhill's southwestern corner. Elgin Road, which runs parallel with Glenpark Avenue and lies at roughly the border of Maryhill, Mornington, and Kenmure, forms a major access road at Maryhill's western edge. This route links with Mailer Street and Kenmure Road at its northernmost point, and with Mornington Road at its southern end.

Little Paisley is an old name for an area close to the boundary of Maryhill and Mornington, between the top of Glen Road and Eglinton Road close to Dunedin Southern Cemetery. It gained this name in the early years of Dunedin's settlement, was settled by weavers from Paisley. The name is rarely used today.

Maryhill was connected from 1855 to 1955 to the Dunedin cable tramway system via the Maryhill Extension. The line, which followed Glenpark Avenue from Mornington, was perfectly straight, and was sometimes referred to as The Big Dipper because of its undulating course.

Maryhill's notable residents have included writer and publisher Sir Alfred Hamish Reed.

== Balaclava ==
Balaclava, named for the Crimean War battle, is a small residential suburb lying close to the southern end of Elgin Road, and in the streets which branch off it. It is linked to Kenmure and the Kaikorai Valley by Barr Street, and with Lookout Point by Mornington Road.

== Demographics ==
Maryhill covers 1.24 km^{2} (0.48 sq mi) and had an estimated population of 2,300 as of June 2025, with a population density of 1,855 people per km^{2}.

Historical population
Year	Pop.	±% p.a.
2006	2,232	—
2013	2,127	−0.69%
2018	2,277	+1.37%

Maryhill had a population of 2,277 at the 2018 New Zealand census, an increase of 150 people (7.1%) since the 2013 census, and an increase of 45 people (2.0%) since the 2006 census. There were 909 households, comprising 1,107 males and 1,170 females, giving a sex ratio of 0.95 males per female. The median age was 36.0 years (compared with 37.4 years nationally), with 453 people (19.9%) aged under 15 years, 492 (21.6%) aged 15 to 29, 1,074 (47.2%) aged 30 to 64, and 264 (11.6%) aged 65 or older.

Ethnicities were 84.8% European/Pākehā, 9.9% Māori, 5.7% Pasifika, 8.4% Asian, and 3.8% other ethnicities. People may identify with more than one ethnicity.

The percentage of people born overseas was 19.4, compared with 27.1% nationally.

Although some people chose not to answer the census's question about religious affiliation, 52.8% had no religion, 36.0% were Christian, 0.1% had Māori religious beliefs, 0.9% were Hindu, 0.8% were Muslim, 0.9% were Buddhist and 1.8% had other religions.

Of those at least 15 years old, 546 (29.9%) people had a bachelor's or higher degree, and 234 (12.8%) people had no formal qualifications. The median income was $33,600, compared with $31,800 nationally. 276 people (15.1%) earned over $70,000 compared to 17.2% nationally. The employment status of those at least 15 was that 987 (54.1%) people were employed full-time, 291 (16.0%) were part-time, and 78 (4.3%) were unemployed.

== Education ==
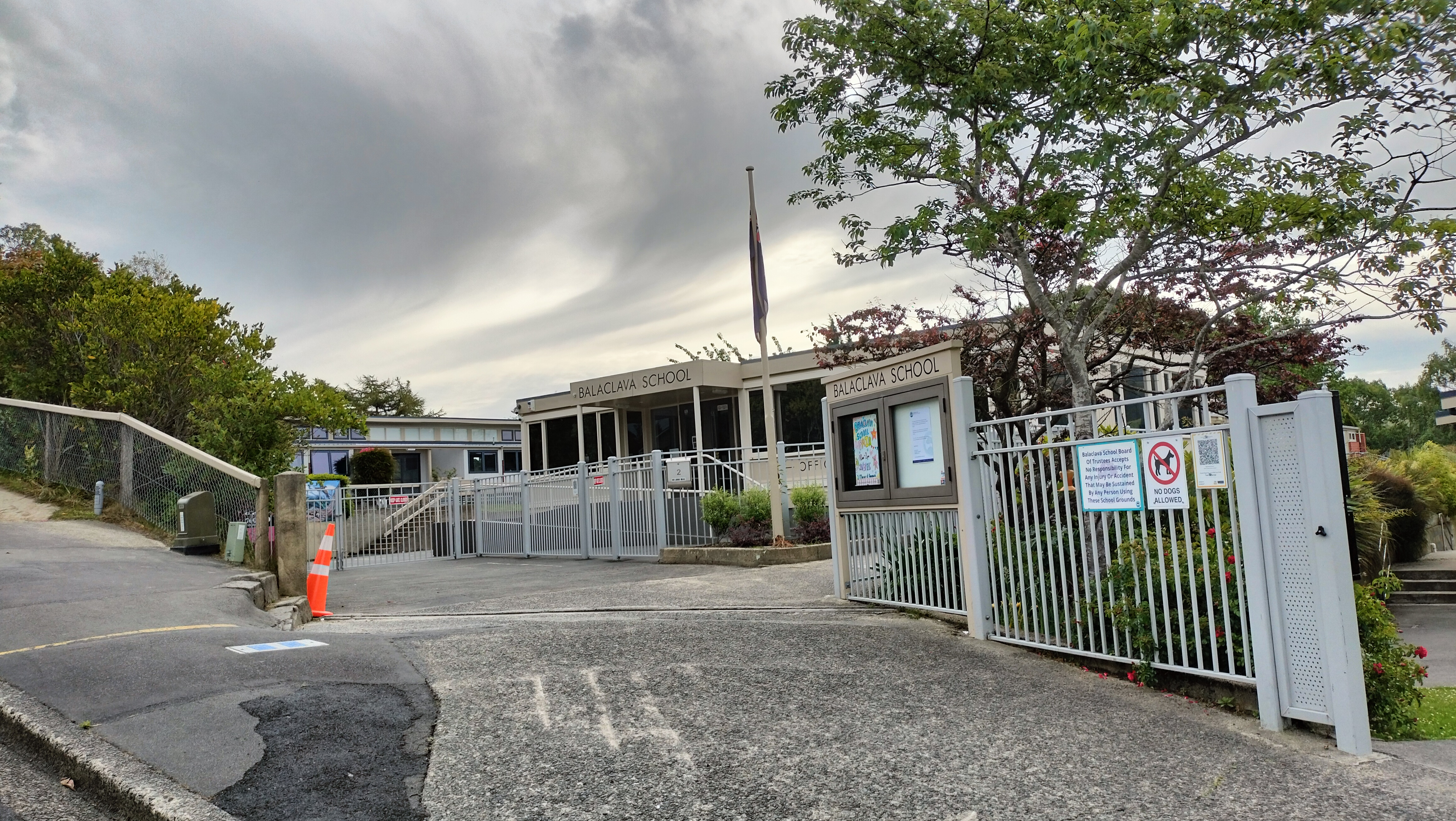
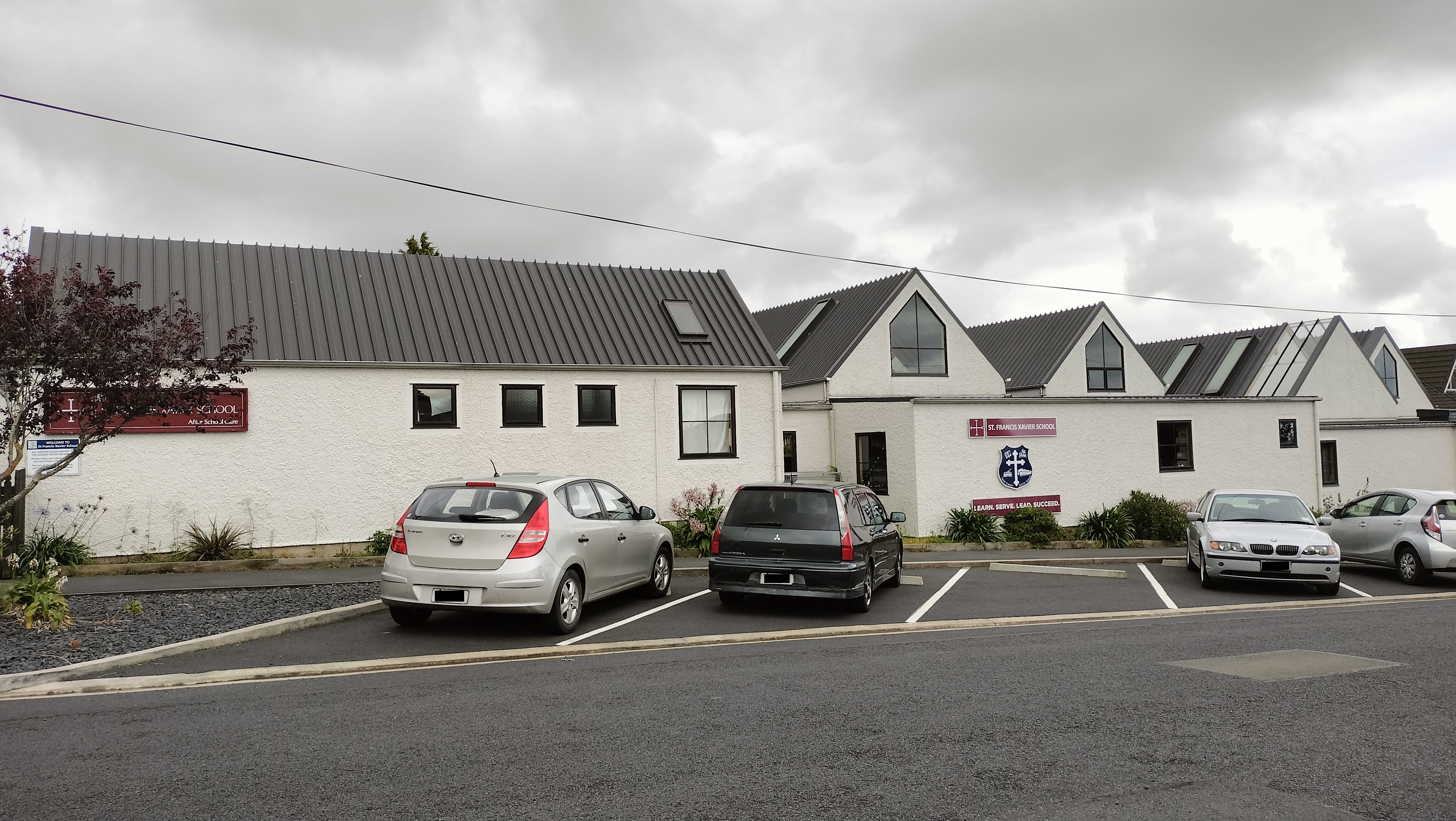
Balaclava School and St Francis Xavier School

Balaclava School is a primary school serving years 1 to 6 with a roll of 234 students. It opened in 1964.

St Francis Xavier School is a Catholic state-integrated contributing primary school serving years 1 to 6 with a roll of 93 students. The school started in a church in 1919 and moved to its own building in 1929.

Both schools are coeducational. Rolls are as of March 2026.
