= Arabella Valpy =

New Zealand politician (1833–1910)

- Born: 1833; West Bengal, India
- Died: 18 January 1910 (aged 76–77)
- Parents: William Henry Valpy (father); Caroline Valpy (mother)

Arabella Valpy (1833 – 18 January 1910) was one of six children of William Henry Valpy and Caroline Valpy (born Jeffreys), a pioneer family that emigrated from Britain to Dunedin, New Zealand, in January 1849 aboard the Ajax. Arabella was born in West Bengal, India, where her father was a judge.

Valpy is remembered for inviting General William Booth to New Zealand to introduce The Salvation Army to the colony. She wrote to him in April 1882, including a bank draft for two hundred pounds to cover costs, and in November 1882 two officers were sent to New Zealand to found the Salvation Army.

She established the Band of Hope Coffee Rooms with her sisters Ellen Penelope Jeffreys and Catherine Valpy and also used her own money to hire a building in Dunedin for a Sailors' Coffee Room, which she ran herself.

Valpy supported the passing of the Electoral Act 1893, which extended suffrage to women and signed the petition to Parliament asking for the vote to be extended to women.
