= Ellen Jeffreys =

New Zealand artist (1827–1904)

- A silhouette of Ellen Jeffreys by Frances Jeffreys, c.1840
- Born: Ellen Penelope Valpy; 12 February 1827; Hamirpur, India
- Died: 8 September 1904 (aged 77); Mornington, New Zealand
- Occupation: Watercolour painter

Ellen Penelope Jeffreys (12 February 1827 – 8 September 1904) was a New Zealand artist. She was born in Hamirpur, India on 12 February 1827, where her father was a judge. She was one of six children of William Henry Valpy and Caroline Valpy (born Jeffreys), a pioneer family which arrived in Dunedin on board the Ajax in January 1849.

Ellen married her cousin Henry Jeffreys in Dunedin in 1852, and the couple moved to Australia with their baby daughter, Caroline. However Caroline died in 1854 and Ellen returned to Dunedin in 1860, pregnant and bringing with her her infant son, Henry. The child, Edmond, was born six months after her return. Ellen moved to live in Oamaru while her sons grew up. Her elder son was hospitalised for mental instability and her younger son died of typhus, and Ellen later moved back to Dunedin to live with her sister Catherine Fulton.

In Dunedin, Ellen joined her sisters Catherine and Arabella Valpy in their charitable work, including establishing the Band of Hope Coffee Rooms.

Her delicate water-colours of local Dunedin scenes are included in the collections of the Hocken Collections and the Otago Early Settlers Museum. They reflect the early influence of an Italian governess and drawing teacher, and of a year spent travelling in Europe with her family.
