= Catherine Fulton =

NZ diarist, community leader, philanthropist, social reformer

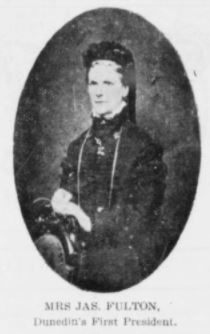
- Born: Catherine Henrietta Elliot Valpy; 19 December 1829; England
- Died: 6 May 1919 (aged 89); Dunedin, New Zealand
- Known for: temperance activism and activism for women's right to vote
- Spouse: James Fulton
- Parent(s): Caroline Jeffreys and William Henry Valpy

Catherine Henrietta Elliot Fulton (née Valpy, 19 December 1829 – 6 May 1919) was a New Zealand diarist, community leader, philanthropist, social reformer and suffragist. She was a founding member of the Dunedin chapter of Women's Christian Temperance Union of New Zealand (WCTU NZ) in 1885 and national president of the WCTU NZ from 1889 to 1892.

== Early life ==
Fulton was one of six children born to William Henry Valpy and Caroline Valpy (née Jeffreys). She was born in Cheltenham, Gloucestershire or in Reading, Berkshire, England on 19 December 1829. She was educated in England and arrived in New Zealand on the Ajax in January 1849.

== Marriage and children ==
Fulton married James Fulton in 1852 and moved to his farm "Ravenscliffe" on the Taieri Plains, Otago. Together they had eight children:

- Arthur Robert William Fulton (1853–1889)
- James Edward Fulton (1854–1928)
- Francis John Fulton (1856–1874)
- Caroline Arabella Fulton (1859–1929)
- Herbert Valpy Fulton (1861–1927)
- Catherine Juliet Fulton Sutherland (1862–1946)
- Robert Valpy Fulton (1865–1924)
- Mabel Violet Fulton Barnett (1866–1958)

The Fultons hosted Presbyterian church services in their house in the early days, and Catherine Fulton taught Sunday school and Bible classes.

== Public life ==
Fulton was the national President of the Women's Christian Temperance Union (WCTU) of New Zealand from 1889 to 1892. She had worked with the American WCTU missionary Mary C. Leavitt to found the Dunedin branch in May 1885 and was its first President. At the first national convention of the WCTU NZ in 1886, Fulton announced that the Dunedin Union had opened the Leavitt House (the former Star and Garter Hotel) to offer a meeting place for their activities with youth who had signed the temperance pledge. Under the leadership of Mrs. McKenzie they had recruited nearly 400 children. They provided after-school activities, including scientific temperance instruction and Bible reading classes. They offered evening classes in cooking, sewing, and carpentry as well as a club for boys.

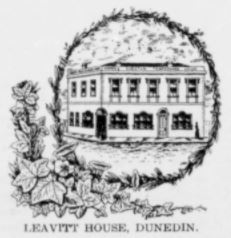

Along with her sisters Ellen and Arabella, she established the Band of Hope Coffee Rooms. She was a strong advocate for women's suffrage and included in her diaries her frustration with politicians who opposed it.

In 1879, James Fulton was elected to the House of Representatives, and in 1889 was appointed to the Legislative Council. He presented to the Upper House a WCTU NZ petition for Women's Franchise that his wife had organised in 1891 - over 10,000 signatures. Catherine Fulton attended the council sessions daily, along with the wives of other parliamentarians, to follow the passage of the Women's Suffrage bill through Parliament, but it failed that year. When the newly amended Electoral Bill was passed in 1893, she drove her women neighbours to the polling booths so they could vote.

After her husband died in 1891, she continued to run the farm alone. Aged 90, she died on 6 May 1919 and was survived by three sons and three daughters.
