= Forbury, New Zealand =

Suburb of Dunedin, New Zealand

Forbury
- Suburb
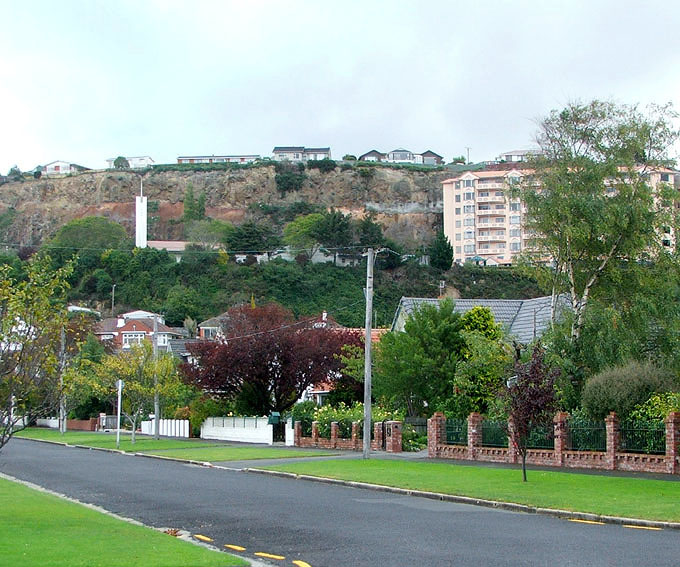
- The Frances Hodgkins Retirement Village and the spire of Dunedin's LDS Church lie to the west of Forbury Road, as seen from Wilson Avenue, Forbury
- Interactive map of Forbury
- Coordinates: 45°54′10″S 170°29′20″E
- Country: New Zealand
- City: Dunedin
- Local authority: Dunedin City Council

Area
  - Land: 56 ha (140 acres)

Population (June 2025)
  - Total: 1,330
  - Density: 2,400/km^{2} (6,200/sq mi)

Caversham		South Dunedin
Kew	Forbury
	St Clair	St Kilda

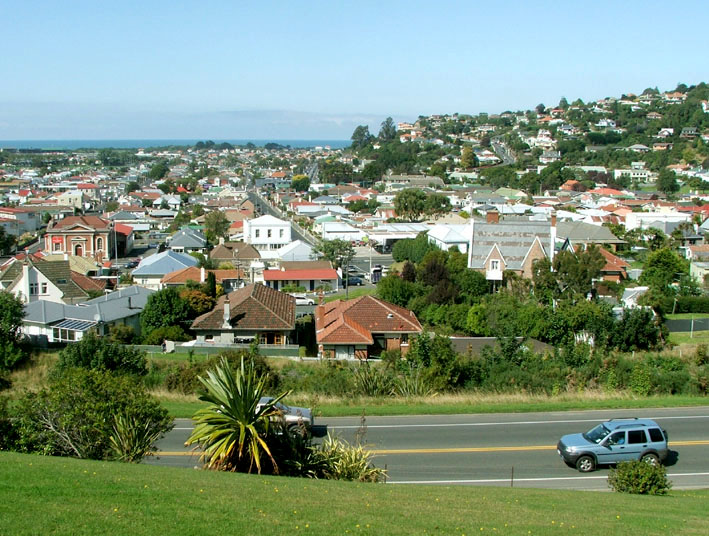
Forbury is visible in the centre left of this image, which looks across Caversham to St Clair Beach.

Forbury is a small residential suburb of the New Zealand city of Dunedin. It is 3 kilometres (1.9 mi) south-southwest of the city centre and lies immediately to the north of St Clair, between it and Caversham.

The suburb is low lying, having originally been marshy land reclaimed in the later 19th century. As such, it is often prone to flooding. It lies at the northwest corner of a plain that stretches across South Dunedin and St Kilda known locally as "The Flat". The land rises to the northwest of the suburb to form Caversham Valley, and immediately to the west the land rises abruptly in a cliff face that is located one kilometre inland from St Clair Beach. The suburb stretches to the east of this cliff across the plain towards South Dunedin. Apart from Caversham and St Clair, Forbury is bounded by St Kilda in the south, Kew in the west, and South Dunedin in the east.

The name Forbury is somewhat confusing, as it is used for several local features, not all of them within the suburb. Notable among these is the former Forbury Park Raceway, one of the city's main horse-racing venues, which actually lies in St Kilda. Forbury Corner, an important road junction, lies in Caversham, though not far from the northern boundary of Forbury.

Prominent features of Forbury include Tonga Park, a sports ground used by Caversham Football Club, and the twin single-sex secondary schools, King's and Queen's. Forbury Road is the suburb's main arterial route, aligned roughly north-south and linking Caversham at Forbury Corner with St Clair at the Esplanade. The suburb's other main roads include Bay View Road, Macandrew Road, Surrey Street, and Easther Crescent. Dunedin's main LDS church sits close to the cliff face at the suburb's western edge, and one of the city's main retirement villages, the Frances Hodgkins Retirement Village is built against the cliff face immediately to the north.

== History ==
Prior to European settlement, the area of Forbury was not permanently settled, but several tracking and walking routes crossed The Flat. The first non-native residents were the Valpys, who arrived in Otago in January 1849, and set up farms along the western edge of The Flat. The farms, named Caversham and The Forbury, were named by early settler William Henry Valpy after Caversham and the Forbury, places around his former home town of Reading, Berkshire, England. The Valpys, who were among the new colony's richest people, built a road known initially as "Valpy's Track" between Dunedin and their farm, roughly along the current route of Hillside and Forbury Roads. The family and their retinue of servants and labourers formed a virtual village close to the northern end of modern St Clair. Other notable settlers in the area were the McIndoe family, whose descendants included noted plastic surgeon Archibald McIndoe.

Much of the swampy ground along the route of Valpy's Track in the area of modern Forbury was reclaimed by Chinese market gardeners, many of whom leased their land from the Valpys and McIndoes. any of the Chinese had come to Otago at the time of the Otago gold rush. Prior to their work, the flat was largely covered with flax and ferns, although their digging produced considerable evidence that the area had once been heavily wooded. The market gardens extended across much of the area of Forbury, across what is now Tonga Park and from Kircaldy Street, St Kilda to Forbury Road.

Although Forbury is now almost entirely a residential suburb, this was not always the case. One of Otago's principal quarries, Shiel's Brickmaking, existed close to the cliff to the west of Forbury Road from 1901 until the 1930s.

== Demographics ==
Forbury covers 0.56 km^{2} (0.22 sq mi) and had an estimated population of 1,330 as of June 2025, with a population density of 2,375 people per km^{2}.

Historical population
Year	Pop.	±% p.a.
2006	1,302	—
2013	1,293	−0.10%
2018	1,326	+0.51%

Forbury had a population of 1,326 at the 2018 New Zealand census, an increase of 33 people (2.6%) since the 2013 census, and an increase of 24 people (1.8%) since the 2006 census. There were 558 households, comprising 633 males and 693 females, giving a sex ratio of 0.91 males per female. The median age was 38.1 years (compared with 37.4 years nationally), with 261 people (19.7%) aged under 15 years, 249 (18.8%) aged 15 to 29, 561 (42.3%) aged 30 to 64, and 255 (19.2%) aged 65 or older.

Ethnicities were 79.9% European/Pākehā, 13.8% Māori, 7.9% Pasifika, 8.1% Asian, and 3.2% other ethnicities. People may identify with more than one ethnicity.

The percentage of people born overseas was 18.6, compared with 27.1% nationally.

Although some people chose not to answer the census's question about religious affiliation, 52.5% had no religion, 35.1% were Christian, 0.2% had Māori religious beliefs, 0.9% were Hindu, 0.5% were Muslim, 0.9% were Buddhist and 2.3% had other religions.

Of those at least 15 years old, 213 (20.0%) people had a bachelor's or higher degree, and 258 (24.2%) people had no formal qualifications. The median income was $24,800, compared with $31,800 nationally. 81 people (7.6%) earned over $70,000 compared to 17.2% nationally. The employment status of those at least 15 was that 465 (43.7%) people were employed full-time, 156 (14.6%) were part-time, and 54 (5.1%) were unemployed.

== Education ==
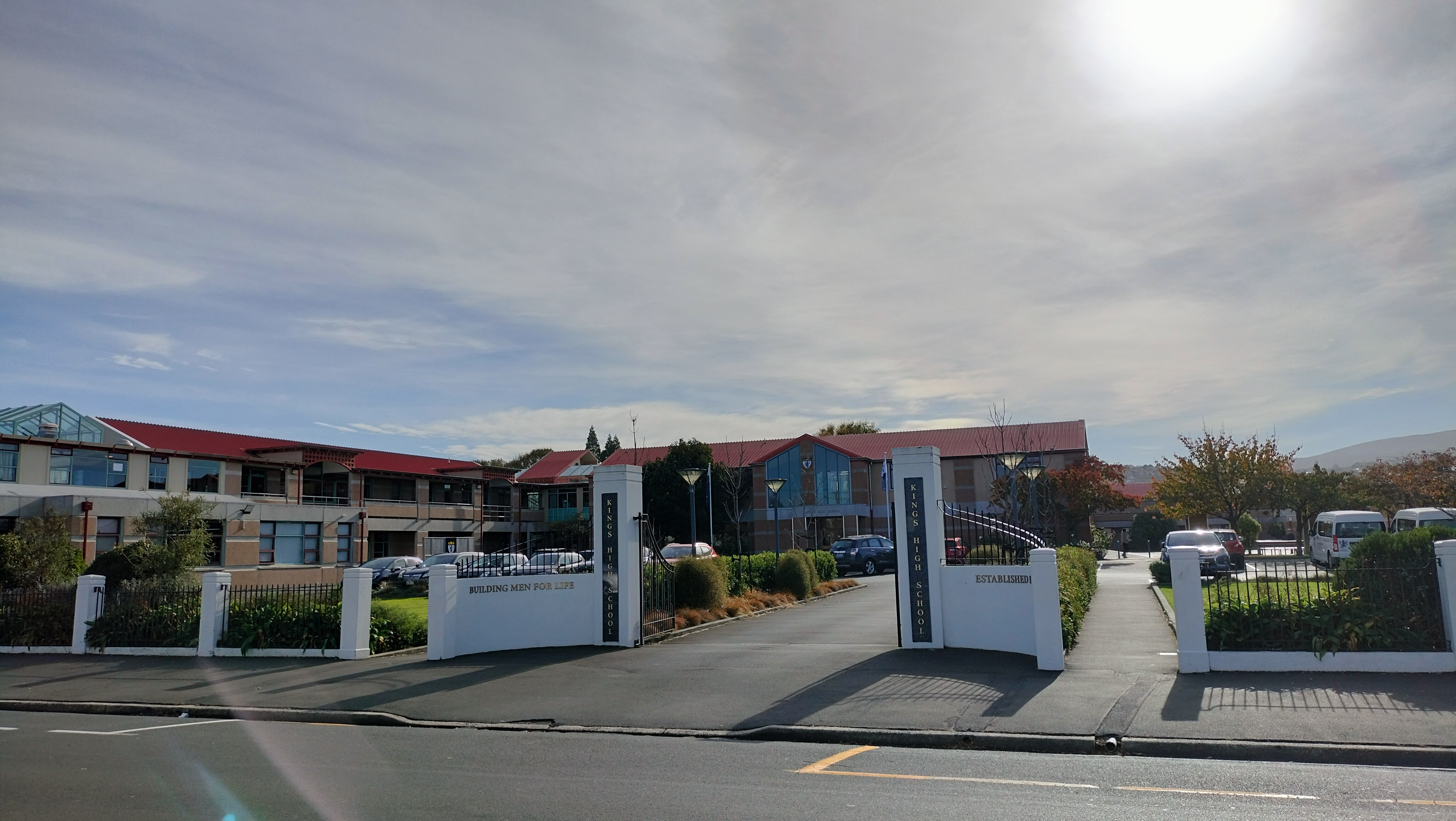
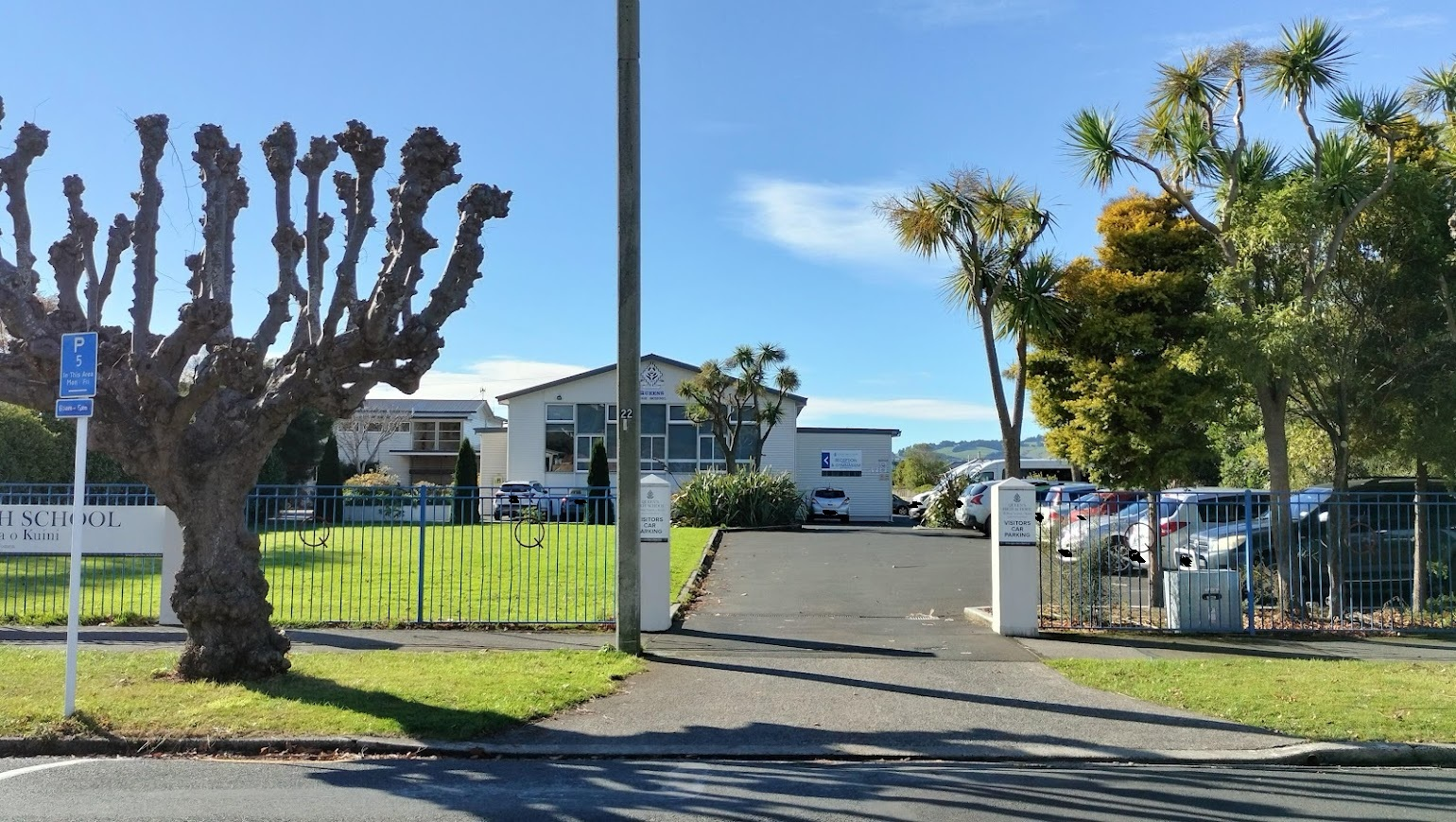
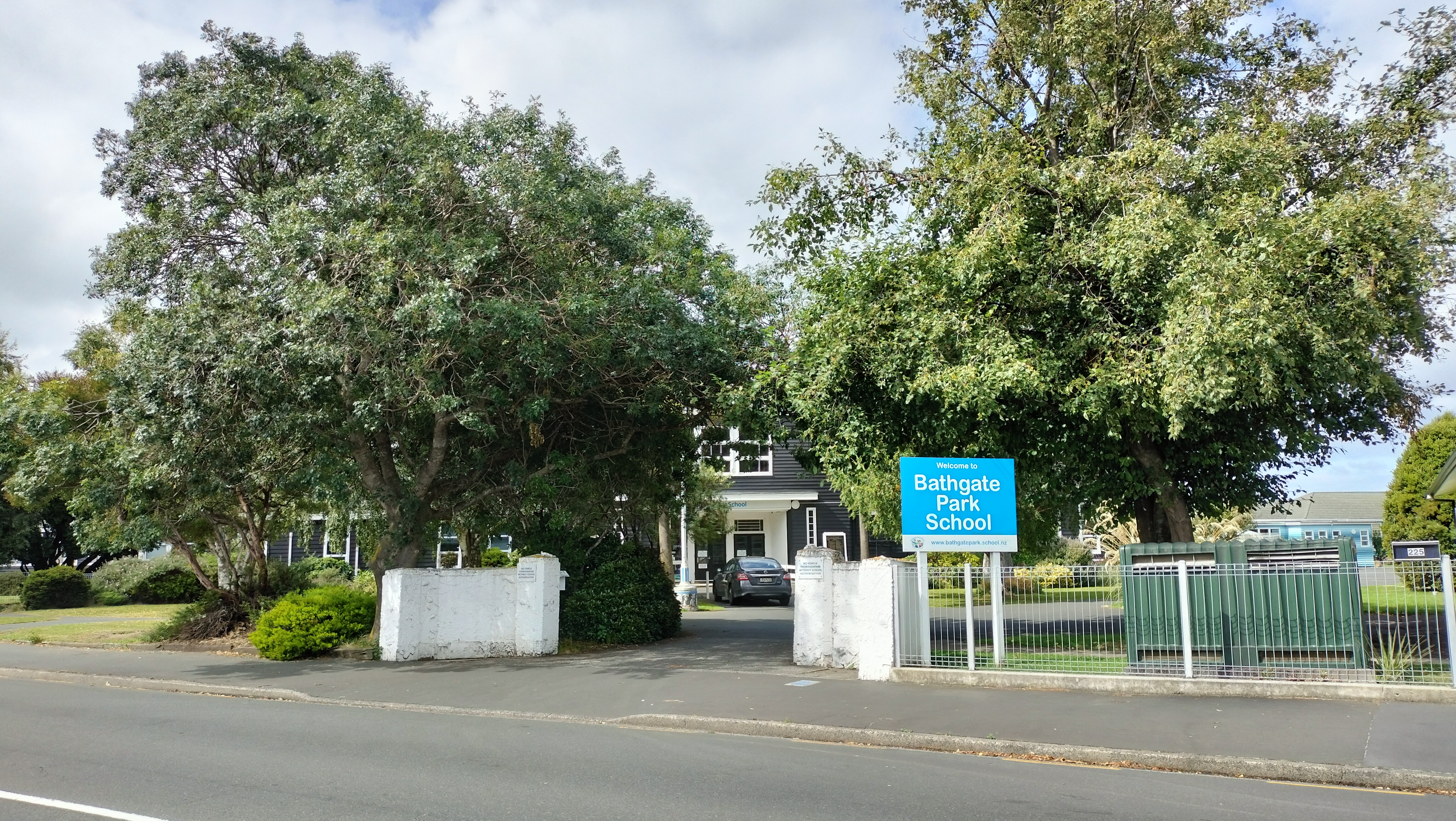
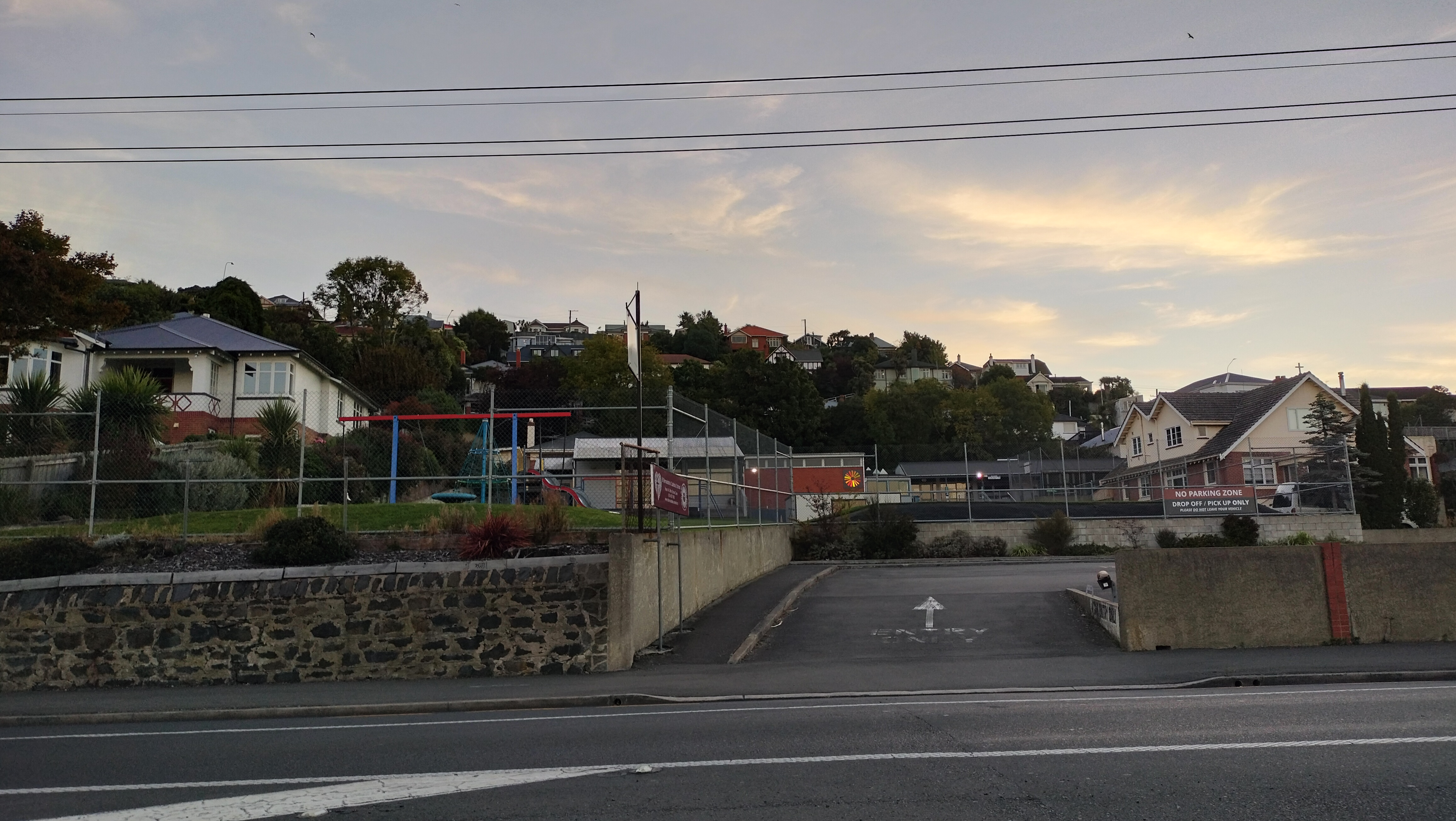
King's High School, Queen's High School, Bathgate Park School and St Bernadette's School

King's High School and Queen's High School are single-sex secondary schools serving years 9 to 13 with rolls of 911 and 611 students, respectively as of March 2026. King's opened in 1936 and Queen's in 1955.

Bathgate Park School is a state full primary school serving years 1 to 8 with a roll of 111 students. The school was established in 2012 after the merger of Forbury School and Macandrew Intermediate. A state-integrated Catholic primary school, St Bernadette's School, is also located in Forbury. It caters for year 1 to 6 students. As of 2022, it has a roll of .

Forbury is home to several kindergartens, and the headquarters of umbrella organisation Dunedin Kindergartens is based in the suburb on Forbury Road.
