= Marlow Park =

Public park and playground in Dunedin, New Zealand

- Dinosaur Park
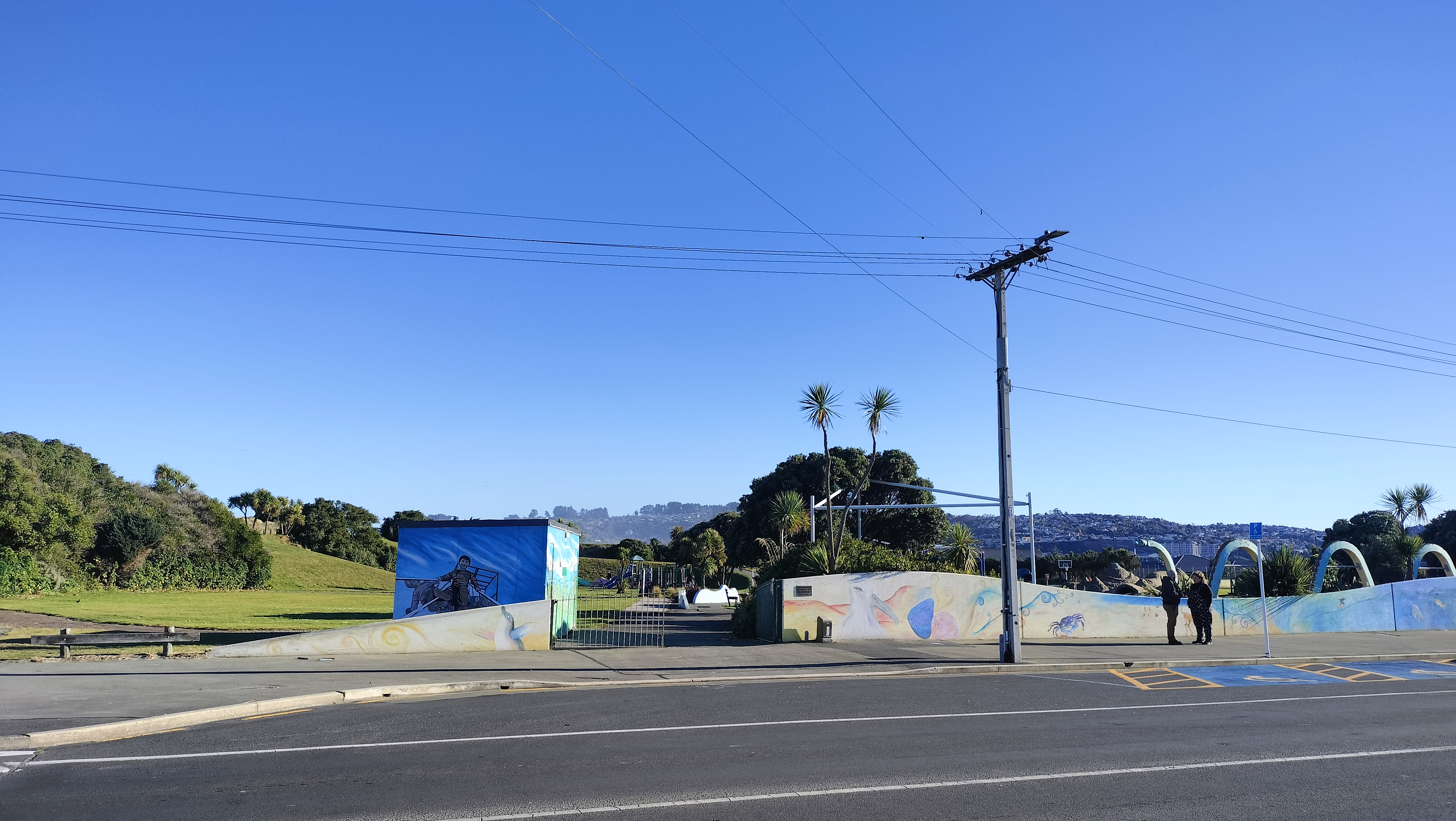
- Entrance to Marlow Park along John Wilson Ocean Drive
- Interactive map of Marlow Park
- Type: Public park and playground
- Location: St Kilda, Dunedin, New Zealand
- Coordinates: 45.90756°S 170.51000°E
- Established: c. 1970
- Owner: Dunedin City Council
- Operator: Dunedin City Council
- Status: Open

Marlow Park, locally known as the Dinosaur Park, is a public park and playground located in the suburb of St Kilda in Dunedin, New Zealand. It is one of the city's best-known playgrounds, recognised for its large concrete dinosaur slide and other sculptural play features. The park is managed by the Dunedin City Council and is a popular recreational space for families and the wider community.

== Location ==
Marlow Park is situated on John Wilson Ocean Drive, near St Kilda Beach, on Dunedin's southern coastline, from which it is sheltered by a line of grassy dunes. Its coastal setting places it within walking distance of the beach and within easy reach of the St Clair Esplanade, making it a frequent destination for both residents and visitors. The park is nestled between two sports grounds, Kettle Park to the west and Hancock Park to the east, and is also close to Tahuna Park sports ground.

== History ==
Marlow Park was developed in the early 1970s. The playground was a project led by the Dunedin South Rotary Club. Since its construction, the park has become informally known as the "Dinosaur Park", a name derived from its prominent dinosaur-themed play structures. While the playground has remained largely unchanged for several decades, it has retained strong cultural significance for generations of Dunedin families.

=== Redevelopment plans ===
In 2025, the Dunedin City Council approved funding for a major redevelopment of Marlow Park as part of its destination playground programme. The council allocated approximately NZ$4.62 million for the upgrade, with planning and detailed design work commencing in late 2025.

Concept plans released during public consultation in January 2026 proposed new play equipment, including in-ground trampolines, a parkour course, and a fossil-themed sand play area. Iconic features such as the dinosaur slide and concrete whale are intended to be retained and refurbished. Construction is expected during the 2026–27 period, subject to final design approval. In June 2026 the Dunedin City Council discussed removing the dinosaur slide as part of proposed renovations, prompting councillor Andrew Simms to launch a campaign to save the slide.

== Facilities ==
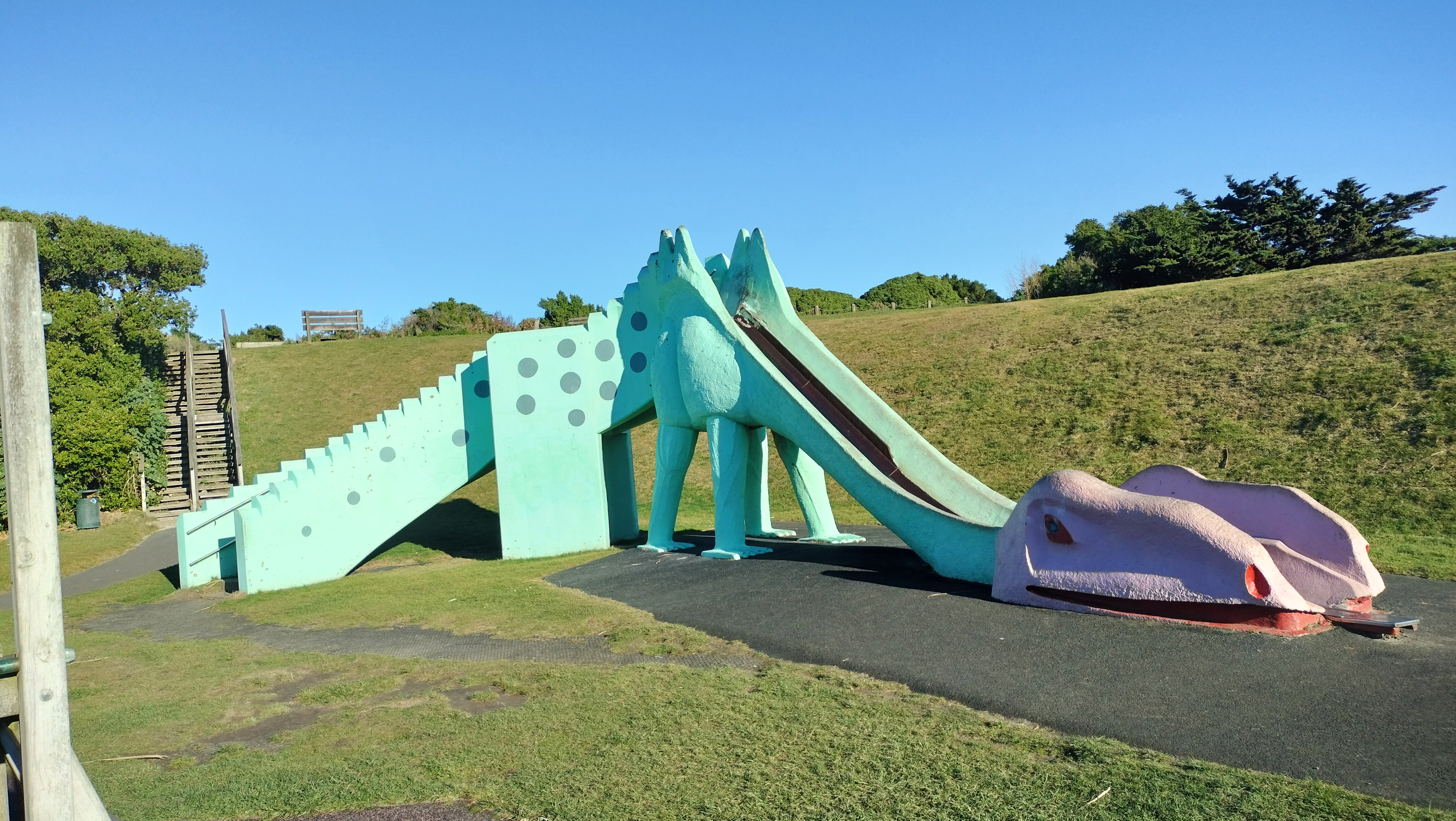
Marlow Park's iconic dinosaur slide

Marlow Park includes a range of recreational and amenity features:

- Dinosaur-themed playground, including a large concrete dinosaur slide and sculptural play elements such as a concrete whale
- Picnic areas
- Public toilets and drinking fountains
- Bookable cycle learning area designed to teach road safety skills
- Grass areas suitable for informal recreation
- Nearby car parking and beach access

== Use ==
The park is primarily used for informal recreation and community play. It is especially popular with families and school-aged children and is frequently used for cycling practice due to its dedicated road-safety learning area.

== Cultural significance ==
Marlow Park is regarded as one of Dunedin's most recognisable playgrounds and is commonly described as a nostalgic landmark for residents. Its distinctive concrete play structures and long association with childhood recreation have contributed to its enduring popularity within the city.
