= Suburbs of Dunedin =

Dunedin is a city of 131,800 people (June 2024) in the South Island of New Zealand. The principal suburbs of Dunedin are as follows. Inner and outer suburbs are ordered by location, clockwise from the city centre, starting due north:

== City Centre ==
Map of central Dunedin. Key: 1-George St 2-The Octagon 3-Moray Place 4-Princes St (numbered at The Exchange) 5-Upper Stuart St 6-Lower Stuart St The black line is the railway, the blue lines are State Highway 1 (northbound to the left, southbound to the right).

The centre of the city is The Octagon, an eight-sided plaza with a central carriageway. This is surrounded by another, larger octagonal street called Moray Place. The main retail area stretches north up George Street toward Dunedin North, and to a lesser extent south along Princes Street and east along Lower Stuart Street. At the end of Lower Stuart Street, 400 metres from the Octagon, lie Anzac Square and the Dunedin Railway Station, with an industrial area and the harbour beyond.

Half a kilometre south of the Octagon along Princes Street is The Exchange, at one time the site of the Dunedin Stock Exchange. The University of Otago was sited here for its first few years before moving to Dunedin North. It was originally called Custom House Square, still its official name.

The city's main retail and business area first grew here, at the intersection of Princes and Rattray Streets, with the main warehousing area immediately to the east, south of the roughly triangular park of Queens Gardens. This area, which has been largely renovated and beautified in the first years of the 21st century, is known as the Warehouse Precinct. Queens Gardens contains the city's main cenotaph. Close by this to the east lie the Otago Settlers Museum and Dunedin Chinese Garden. Beyond this are the docks at the head of the Otago Harbour. The area to the east of the railway from the docks north to the railway station has been the subject of long-term rejuvenation and redevelopment plans which may eventually see it turned into a district of boutique restaurants and shops.

The central business district has slowly moved north to George Street, although there has been some recent retail development in Crawford and Cumberland Streets, south and east of the Exchange. Immediately above and to the west of the central city is the hilly area known as City Rise, which contains many of the city's more impressive old houses. It is bounded from above by the Town Belt, one of the world's oldest green belts, designed by Charles Kettle in 1846.

== Inner suburbs ==
The centre of Dunedin lies within a circle of hills broken only by the Otago Harbour and Ocean Beach, the latter being a long beach better known divided as St Clair, Middle St Kilda beaches. Suburbs within these hills and along their crest are usually regarded as inner while those beyond are outer. Since this distinction is largely by topography rather than true distance, several "outer suburbs" (such as Wakari and Halfway Bush) lie as close to the city centre as some inner suburbs (such as those in the North East and Leith Valleys) and share many of their features.

The main inner suburbs, clockwise from due north of the city centre, include the following:

=== Pine Hill, Dalmore, and Liberton ===
Pine Hill is a southern spur of Mount Cargill, the 660-metre volcanic outcrop that dominates the northern end of Dunedin's urban area and is topped by the city's main television transmitter tower. The hill lies between the valleys of the Leith River (usually called the Water of Leith) to the west and its tributary Lindsay Creek to the east, and looks down across North East Valley. The Northern Motorway, part of State Highway 1 winds north around the hill's western flank. The suburb, which sits atop the spur, is four kilometres north of the city centre. Pine Hill's 2001 population was 2,259, including the older suburb of Dalmore to the south and the post-war state housing development of Liberton. The latter is home to Liberton Christian School, Dunedin's first special-character Protestant primary school. The upper section of Pine Hill (Campbells Road area) is often referred to as Pine Heights. Dalmore is also home to the annual Feastock festival held in a backyard on Fea Street.

=== Dunedin North ===
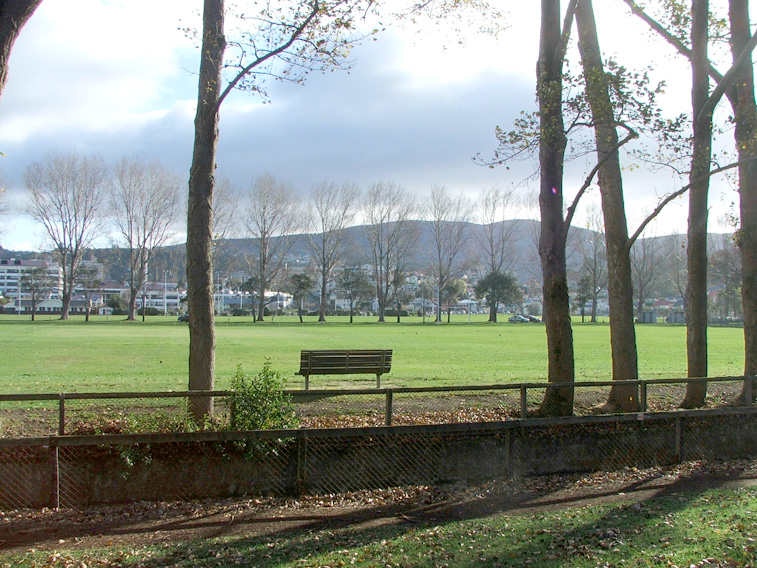
Logan Park

The northern end of the city centre is designated Dunedin North. Its main features are the main campuses of Dunedin's two public tertiary institutions, the University of Otago and Otago Polytechnic, which are situated along the lower reaches of the Water of Leith. This river disgorges into the Otago Harbour in Dunedin North, close to one of the city's main parks, Logan Park (a reclaimed lake), which contains the Logan Park High School and the sporting facilities of the Caledonian Ground and University Oval. The city's main indoor sporting arena, Forsyth Barr Stadium is also located in Dunedin North, immediately to the southeast of Logan Park. Dunedin North's 2001 population, including the University area, was 7,047.

One of the city's oldest cemeteries, the Dunedin Northern Cemetery, is located in Dunedin North, as are the Dunedin Botanical Gardens. State Highway 1 joins the Dunedin road network at a busy intersection at the foot of Pine Hill and North East Valley at the "Gardens Corner", close to the Botanical Gardens' northwestern edge.

=== North East Valley and The Gardens ===
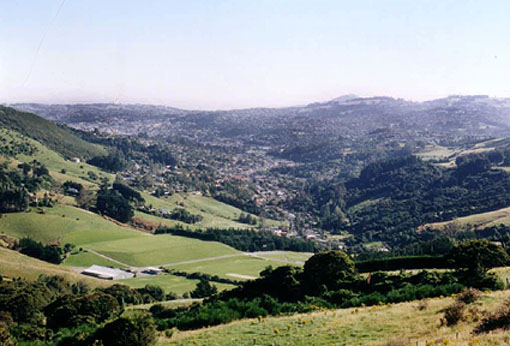
Looking down North East Valley towards Dunedin city

Lindsay Creek, a tributary of the Water of Leith, flows southwest down the long North East Valley at the northern end of Dunedin's urban area. This valley, lying between Pine Hill and Signal Hill, houses a residential suburb consisting of one main road with streets heading off it up the steep hills on either side. One of these streets, Baldwin Street, is listed as the world's steepest street. The original North East Valley post office was located near the foot of Baldwin Street, but was relocated to the Gardens to be nearer the retail area. North East Valley's 2001 population was 4,266.

The southern end of the valley is usually referred to as The Gardens or The Gardens Corner (The Dunedin Botanical Gardens are located nearby). The Gardens Corner contains one of Dunedin's main retail areas, and also one of its busiest road intersections - here the Northern Motorway (State Highway 1) joins Dunedin's one-way street system. This area includes Dunedin North Intermediate School and several University halls, notably Knox College and Salmond College.

=== Normanby and Mount Mera ===
Normanby is the name of the northern end of North East Valley, at which point Dunedin's urban area gives way to open countryside. The land here is steeply sloping, as it is the foothills of Mount Cargill. The slopes of Mount Cargill itself are densely wooded, and are crisscrossed with walking tracks, some of which start at the Bethune's Gully reserve, at the northern end of Normanby. Chingford Park, at the Normanby end of the valley is now a sports field and recreational reserve, but was originally the residence of one of Sam Neill's forebears, who was founder of Dunedin Company Wilson Neill. The large house is now gone, but the stone stables still on the site are impressive.

Mount Mera is an area of state housing sitting on the north facing side of the valley, just above Normanby.

=== Opoho ===
Opoho suburb sits on the western flank of Signal Hill overlooking North East Valley and the Dunedin Botanic Gardens. It is a residential suburb with very mixed demographics, containing student flats, significant numbers of elderly citizens, and the houses of many in the academic community. Above the suburb sits the Centennial Lookout, a memorial built on the top of Signal Hill to mark the centenary of New Zealand in 1940. Impressive views over the city can be gained from here.

=== Ravensbourne ===
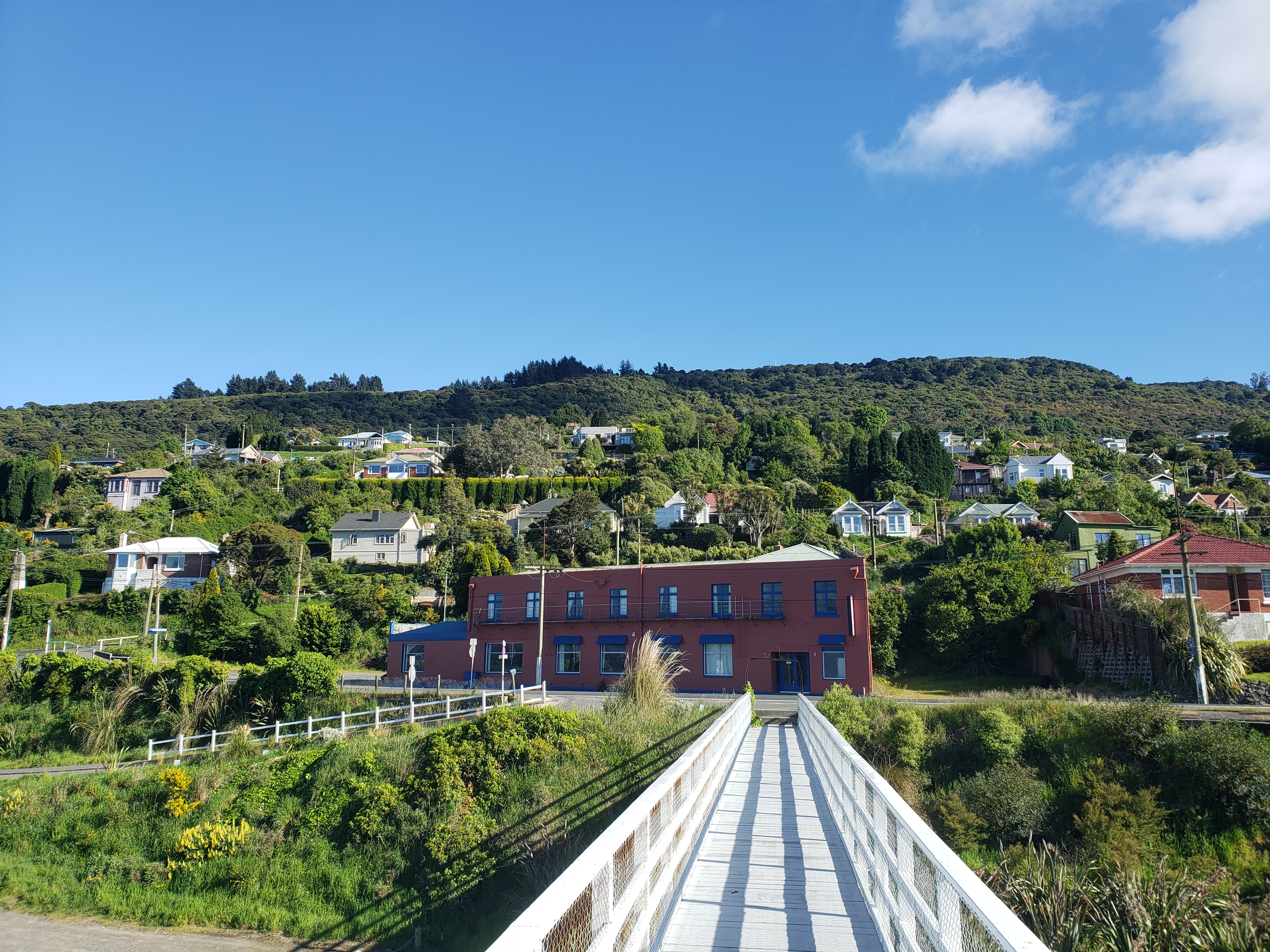
View of Ravensbourne from the railway bridge

The suburb of Ravensbourne sits on the southern slopes of Signal Hill, close to the edge of the Otago Harbour. It is one of the older hill suburbs in the west harbour area of Dunedin. Separated from the inner city by a quarry at the eastern end of Logan Park. It is dominated by the Ravensdown fertiliser factory at the southern end of the suburb at the harbour's edge. Ravensbourne's 2001 population was 1,269.

=== Shiel Hill, Waverley, and Vauxhall ===
Across the Harbour from Ravensbourne are (from north to south) Shiel Hill, Waverley, and Vauxhall. They form a continuous residential suburb at the western end of Otago Peninsula on the flank of Shiel Hill, overlooking Andersons Bay and the upper reaches of Otago Harbour.

=== Ocean Grove (Tomahawk) ===
Ocean Grove, formerly called Tomahawk (a name by which it is still widely known) lies on the south coast of the city end of Otago Peninsula, in and around the valley formed by the two-lobed Tomahawk Lagoon. It has much the feel of a separate settlement, as it is separated from sight of Dunedin by the bluff of Lawyers Head. Other than the lagoon, its main feature is Tomahawk Beach. The area was the site of coastal defences during World War II, and the remains of lookouts from the era can be found on a hill above the suburb. Ocean Grove is connected by road to Tahuna (which lies to the west), and via a steep road to the ridge road along the centre of Otago Peninsula.

=== Andersons Bay, Tahuna, and Tainui ===
Andersons Bay is a residential and light industrial zone to the south of the central city and east of South Dunedin. It extends along the former shoreline and across reclaimed land close to the head of the Otago Harbour, with its southernmost point being at the Andersons Bay Inlet at the foot of part of the Otago Peninsula. A major sports facility, The Edgar Centre, is located close to the harbour foreshore just to the north of Andersons Bay Inlet. Andersons Bay's 2001 population was 2,532. Dunedin's main cemetery, Andersons Bay Cemetery and the golf links of Chisholm Park are located in the smaller suburb of Tahuna, which lies to the south, close to the coastal promontory of Lawyers Head. Between the two is the small residential suburb of Tainui.

=== Musselburgh ===
Musselburgh (named after the Scottish town) is located at the foot of the Otago Peninsula. It is at the narrowest point of the isthmus (at this point some 1,500 metres wide) connecting the Peninsula to the mainland. Musselburgh is dominated by a series of large rocky outcrops known as the Musselburgh Rise which stand above the eastern edge of the flat area of St Kilda. Musselburgh's 2001 population was 2,835.

=== South Dunedin and Kensington ===
South Dunedin is the city's second most important retail district, and lies immediately below the major road junction of Cargill's Corner some 2,500 metres south of the city centre. The main features of South Dunedin are the railway workshops which cover some 100,000 square metres (25 acres) at the northern edge of the suburb, and Carisbrook (the city's former main sports stadium), both of which straddle the border of South Dunedin and Caversham. At the northeastern edge of the suburb, closest to the city centre, is the small residential area of Kensington. South Dunedin's 2001 population was 2,538.

=== St Kilda ===
The beaches of St Kilda and St Clair—properly called Ocean Beach—stretch along the city's south coast for some 3,500 metres between Lawyers Head and Forbury Head. The suburb of St Kilda, which until 1989 was a separate borough, is a densely populated residential area stretching across the flat land between the beach and the light industrial areas to the south of the central city. St Kilda's 2001 population was 5,904. At the southern end of the suburb lies Forbury Park, the city's main horse racing (trotting and pacing) venue.

St Kilda has three pubs, a bowling green, a badminton hall as well as an Olympic-sized ice-skating rink. It is also the home of the St Kilda Sentinel Brass Band, Pirates Rugby Club, Otago Model Engineering Society, Ocean Beach Railway, the St Kilda Surf Lifesaving Club, and a Hot Rod club.

=== St Clair and Forbury ===
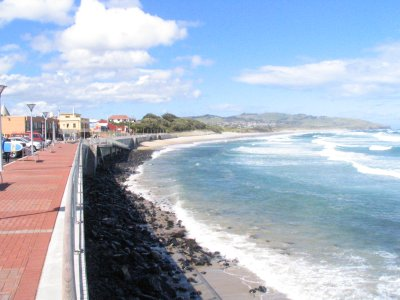
St Clair Beach, Dunedin

Five kilometres southwest of the city centre, St Clair lies on the lower slopes and at the foot of Forbury Hill. One of the city's wealthier suburbs, many fine houses are situated in the tree-clad slopes. Close to the summit of the hill is one of the city's top golf courses (St Clair Golf Course) and the ruins of Cargill's Castle. At the foot of the hill are St Clair Beach, a restaurant and resort complex, and an open-air heated salt-water swimming pool; the beach's sea wall, esplanade and oceanway were rebuilt and renovated in 2004. The beach is one of the South Island's more popular surfing venues and is also home to the St Clair Surf Life Saving Club. The small promontory of White Island lies three kilometres off the beach. The twin single-sex secondary schools of King's and Queen's lie close to the point where St Clair, St Kilda and Forbury meet. The smaller suburb of Forbury is located to the north of St Clair, between it and Caversham. St Clair's 2001 population was 4,179.

=== Corstorphine and Kew ===
Close to the summit of Forbury Hill, and stretching out towards St Clair to the south and the outer suburb of Concord to the west is the large suburb of Corstorphine. This suburb, which contains a large proportion of state houses, was built during the 1930s-1950s. Lower down the hill to the east, close to Caversham and Forbury, lies the smaller but more prosperous suburb of Kew.

=== Calton Hill ===
Calton Hill, as its name suggests is an alleviated suburb on the south-western edge of 'inner' Dunedin. From Forbury Hill lies the spur known as Calton Hill which runs north into the Caversham Valley. Named after Calton Hill in Edinburgh, Scotland, the 'Township of Calton Hill' was gazetted on the 19 November 1910. There is currently no official census information for population of the suburb, but aerial maps suggest approximately 400-500 households. Five roads form its perimeter: Caversham Valley Road motorway to the north; Riselaw Road in the south-west; Corstophine Road in the south-east (until Sidey Street intersection); and Sidey Street/ Burnett Street in the north-east. The suburb contains 2-3 retail business, but is mainly residential. There is farmland on its south-western border, whilst the direct neighbour suburbs are Caversham, Corstophine, Concord and Lookout Point.

=== Caversham and Lookout Point ===
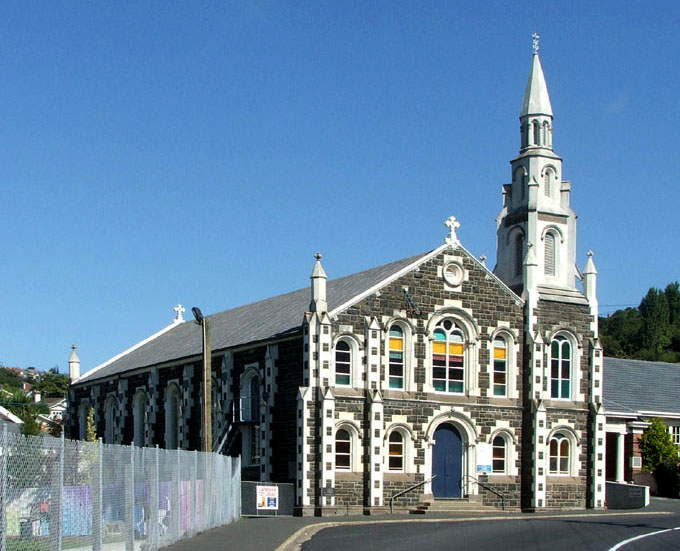
Caversham Presbyterian Church

One of Dunedin's older suburban areas is Caversham, lying in a valley close to the Dunedin Southern Motorway (part of State Highway 1), the main transport access to Dunedin from the south. The suburb contains a small retail area, but is mainly residential. Carisbrook, the city's former main rugby venue, is situated at the eastern end of the suburb. This end of the suburb is dominated by one of Dunedin's largest industrial sites, the Hillside Railway Workshops. At the western end of the suburb, the valley rises steeply, culminating in a saddle of the motorway at Lookout Point. From here, there are views over the outer suburbs of Burnside, Green island, and Abbotsford. Caversham's 2001 population was 5,019.

=== Mornington, Maryhill, and Balaclava ===
Due west of the city centre, with primary access up High Street, sits the hill suburb of Mornington. Southwest of it is Maryhill, while Balaclava is a small locality to the west of Maryhill. Mornington was originally served by a cable car from The Exchange, with a connecting line running from Mornington to Maryhill.

Maryhill takes its name from a district in the city of Glasgow in Scotland, due to settlers from Maryhill in Scotland many years ago.

=== Roslyn and Belleknowes ===
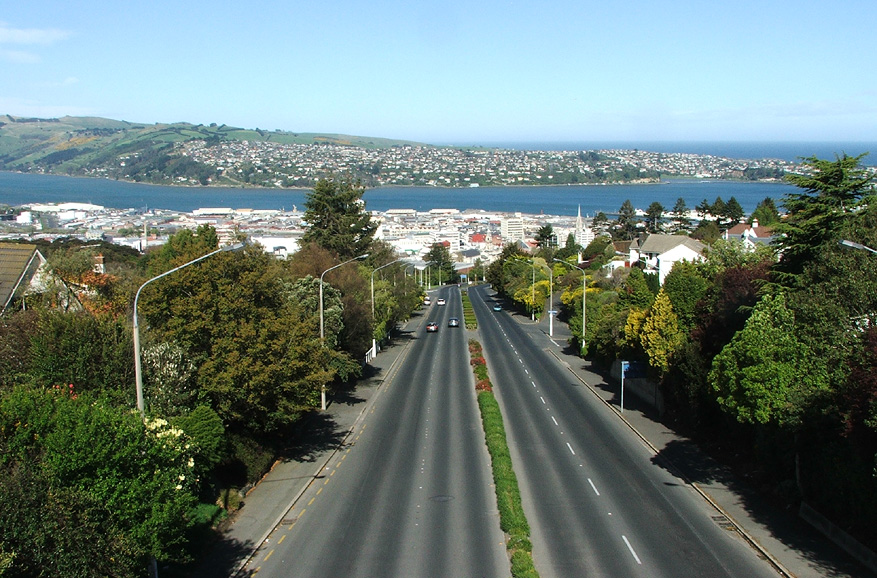
Looking from the Roslyn bridge, toward Dunedin City

The suburb of Roslyn lies atop a crest which forms part of the inner ring of hills around Dunedin. Excellent views of the inner city can be gained from the Roslyn overbridge, which is 1,500 metres northwest of the city centre, and 150 metres above sea level. Several of the city's most prestigious schools are located close to this suburb and its northern neighbour, Maori Hill. Its southwestern end merges imperceptibly into Belleknowes. Roslyn's 2001 population was 3,957.

=== Maori Hill and Prospect Park ===
Along with St Clair, Maori Hill is regarded as one of Dunedin's more exclusive suburbs. Many fine houses are located among the trees of the city's Town Belt, which snakes around the slopes of the crest which surrounds much of the inner city. Unlike neighbouring hill suburbs like Roslyn, Maori Hill was not served by a cable car, possibly underlying its greater degree of exclusivity. Maori Hill's 2001 population was 1,956. Prospect Park, a small suburb centred on the park of the same name, is sited at the northern end of the ridge which runs through the hill suburbs south to Lookout Point, overlooking the broad canyon of the Leith Valley.

=== Woodhaugh, Glenleith, and Leith Valley ===
At the northeastern end of the coastal plain that makes up the central city area, the Water of Leith forms a valley leading between Maori Hill and Pine Hill. In its lower reaches, this valley is broad, and is dominated by Woodhaugh Gardens. Much of Dunedin's water supply comes from reservoirs in the upper reaches of the Leith Valley. These include Ross Creek Reservoir, the oldest reservoir still in active use in New Zealand. Numerous popular walking tracks traverse the bush-clad reserve land surrounding this reservoir. Once a quarry, this is one of the city's oldest parks, dating from 1895. The area around the park is known as Woodhaugh and is a popular area for student accommodation, 15 minute walk to the university and the centre of the city. Beyond Woodhaugh, the valley narrows to become Glenleith, a residential suburb which follows the ribbon of the river. Past Glenleith is rough, undeveloped hill country, dotted by small farms. This area and the two suburbs of Glenleith and Woodhaugh is often collectively known simply as Leith Valley.

== Outer suburbs ==
Many of the outer suburbs of Dunedin were separate towns until local government reorganisation in the late 1980s, and are still regarded as towns by some Dunedinites. The main outer suburbs, clockwise from the city centre (starting due north), include the following:

=== Maia and Burkes ===
Beyond Ravensbourne on the main road to the mouth of the Otago Harbour and the town of Port Chalmers lie the two small settlements of Maia and Burkes (or Burkes Bay). Maia, whose name thought by casual observers to be of Māori origin, was actually named by a former mayor for a character from Greek mythology, Maia, one of the daughters of the Titan Atlas.

=== St Leonards ===
On the west bank of the Otago Harbour beyond Burkes, equidistant between Ravensbourne and Port Chalmers, lies the sleepy residential settlement of St Leonards. This was named by early settler David Carey (after whom Careys Bay, near Port Chalmers, was named) for St Leonards-on-Sea in England, which was the birthplace of his wife. St Leonards' 2001 population was 729.
