= Scottish New Zealanders =

New Zealanders of Scottish ancestry

- (Scotland) (New Zealand)
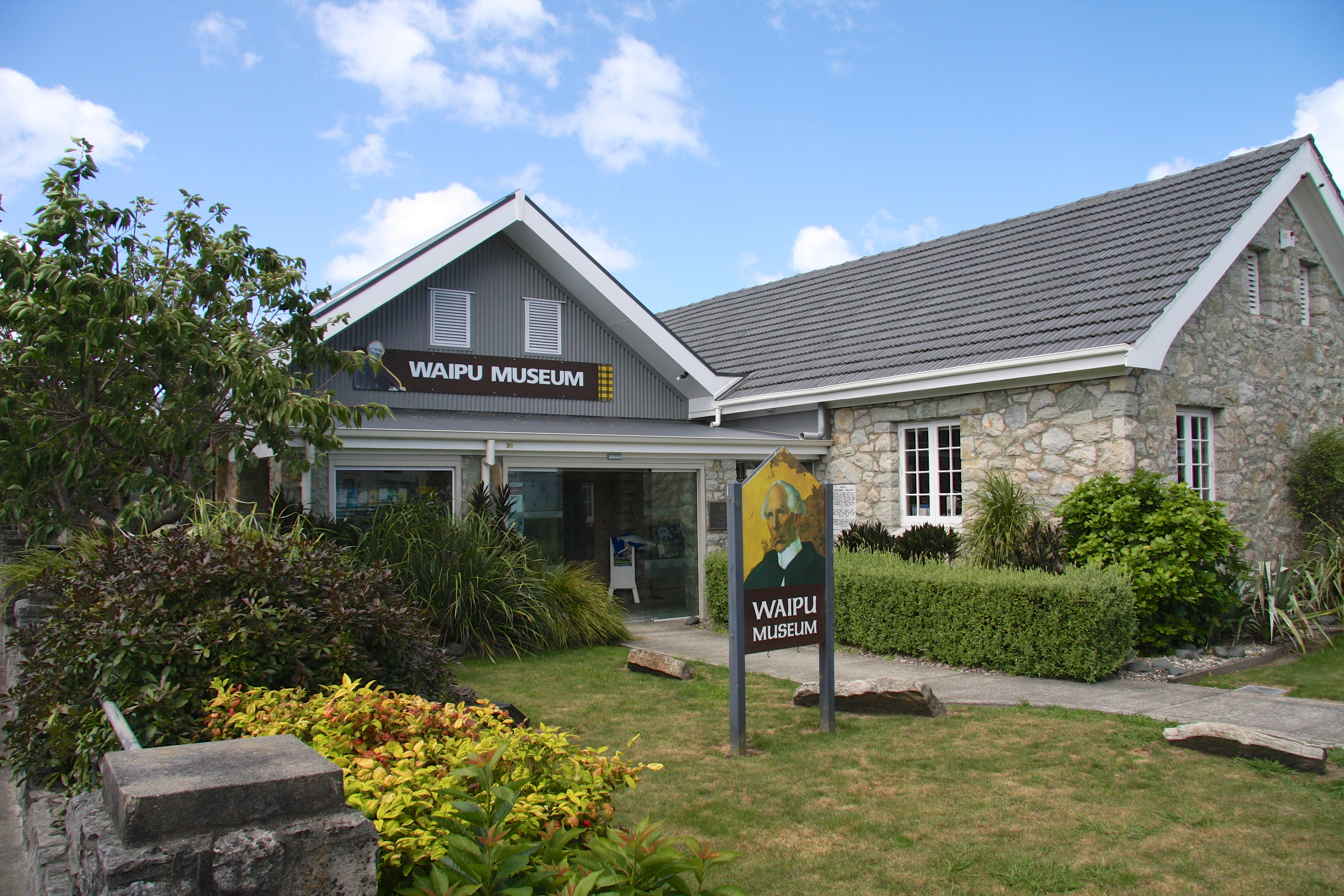
- Waipu Scottish Migration Museum

Total population
- 18,627 (by birth, 2018); estimated amount by ancestry 1-2 million

Regions with significant populations
- throughout New Zealand, but especially in Otago, and Southland, with the highest concentration in Dunedin

Languages
- New Zealand English (Southland burr), Scots, Scottish Gaelic

Religion
- Historically or traditionally Protestantism, especially Presbyterianism, (large minorities of other Protestant denominations), with smaller Catholic minorities. Increasingly irreligious

Related ethnic groups
- Scottish people, Scottish Australians, European New Zealanders, Irish New Zealanders, Welsh New Zealanders

Scottish New Zealanders are New Zealanders of Scottish ancestry or who originate from Scotland. The number of New Zealanders who are descended from Scots is unknown, as the New Zealand census asks for ethnicity, not ancestry, and most have now assimilated; nonetheless, the vast majority of Pākehā, or European New Zealanders are of British and Irish descent, and it has been estimated that 1–2 million New Zealanders have roots in Scotland. This includes many Māori, as a large proportion have European roots as well. Most Scottish New Zealanders live in New Zealand's deep southern regions of Otago and Southland, where they have had a substantial influence. Scottish influence on Dunedin, one of New Zealand's most historically important cities was profound, and Presbyterianism is the major religion south of Christchurch. In some parts of Otago and all of Southland, there is a distinct accent known as the "Southland burr", which differs from mainstream New Zealand English for being strongly rhotic.

Scottish migration to New Zealand dates back to the earliest period of European colonisation. However, identification as "British" or "European" New Zealanders can sometimes obscure their origin. The majority of Scottish immigrants settled in the South Island. All over New Zealand, the Scots developed different means to bridge the old homeland and the new. Many Caledonian societies were formed, well over 100 by the early twentieth century, who helped maintain Scottish culture and traditions. From the 1860s, these societies organised annual Caledonian Games throughout New Zealand. The Games were sports meets that brought together Scottish settlers and the wider New Zealand public. In so doing, the Games gave Scots a path to cultural integration as Scottish New Zealanders.

== Numbers ==
Scottish-born of New Zealand per official census figures.

Year	Population	% of overseas-born
1858	7,976	
1901	47,858	
1961	47,078	
2001	28,683	4.1%
2006	29,016	3.3%
2013	25,953	2.6%
2018	26,136	

The settlement of English in the North Island and northern South Island and Scottish in the Deep South is reflected in the dominance of Anglicanism and Presbyterianism in the respective regions.

In 2013, the number of New Zealanders born in Scotland was recorded as 25,953, making it the eighth most common place of birth. This can be contrasted with the mid-20th century, e.g. in 1956, when the figure was 46,401, making Scotland the second most common place of birth. However, these figures only include people born in Scotland, not those New Zealanders who claim a Scottish identity through their parents, grandparents, or even further back. In addition, many New Zealanders come from mixed origins, with Scottish New Zealanders co-identifying as Māori or another ethnic group. In 2006, 15,039 self-identified as Scottish.

== Scottish culture in New Zealand ==
Te Ara: The Encyclopedia of New Zealand notes that in many cases, the distinctive cultural features of Scottish settlers often disappeared in a generation or two, being replaced with a British identity which consisted mostly of English culture:

After one generation in New Zealand the Irish and Gaelic languages disappeared, and a more generalised loyalty to Britain developed. School pupils learnt about the heroes of Britain and read British literature. Most of this was in fact English culture, although certain Scottish writers like Walter Scott had their place. Even the Irish, who followed the fortunes of their homeland politically, played the English game of rugby football. The sense of being Britons was a necessary prelude to becoming New Zealanders.

Today, if there can be said to be a "stronghold" of Scottish culture in New Zealand, it would be in the regions of Southland and Otago, although many of the place names around the Waikato region also bear links with Scotland (notably the city of Hamilton and town of Huntly).

Some of the following aspects of Scottish culture can still be found in some parts of New Zealand.

- Bagpiping and pipe bands
- Burns Supper
- Ceilidhs
- Highland games
- Hogmanay, the Scottish New Year
- Presbyterianism – the majority of Scottish settlers were Presbyterian (although a substantial number were not).
- Tartan, some regions having their own tartan, such as Otago. Additionally Scottish dress is worn by some New Zealanders to celebrate their ancestral heritage.
- Tartan Day, which in New Zealand falls on 1 July, the date of the repeal proclamation in 1782 of the Act of Proscription that banned the wear of Scottish national dress.
- Some parts of South Island have a rhotic accent called Southland burr, reflecting an influence from Lowland Scots and Scottish English, although this is less pronounced than in Scotland itself.

The Scottish Gaelic language and culture did not fare well. Turakina in Wanganui was originally settled by Gaelic speakers, but there is not much trace other than annual Highland games.

In the past, Scottish army regiments have been raised from New Zealand, such as the New Zealand Scottish Regiment, and their successor units still exist in the New Zealand Army. According to Collins Encyclopaedia of Scotland:

New Zealand contains two battalions of New Zealand Scottish affiliated to the Black Watch. Their forerunners include a number of Highland Companies, and the Dunedin Highland Rifles

The Otago and Southland Regiment is still linked to the Highlanders in the British Army.

== Otago and Southland Province ==
The Otago Settlement, sponsored by the Free Church of Scotland, materialised in March 1848 with the arrival of the first two immigrant ships from Greenock on the Firth of Clyde – the John Wickliffe and the Philip Laing. Captain William Cargill, a veteran of the Peninsular War, served as the colony's first leader: Otago citizens subsequently elected him to the office of Superintendent.

Provincial government in New Zealand ceased in 1876, and the national limelight gradually shifted northwards. The colony divided itself into counties in 1876, two in Otago being named after the Scottish independence heroes Wallace and Bruce.

Originally part of Otago Province, Southland Province (a small part of the present Region, centred on Invercargill) was one of the provinces of New Zealand from 1861 until 1870. It rejoined Otago Province due to financial difficulties, and the provinces were abolished entirely in 1876.

In 1856, a petition was put forward to Thomas Gore Browne, the Governor of New Zealand, for a port at Bluff. Browne agreed to the petition and gave the name Invercargill to the settlement north of the port. Inver comes from the Scots Gaelic word inbhir meaning a river's mouth and Cargill is in honour of Captain William Cargill, who was at the time the Superintendent of Otago, of which Southland was then a part.

== Dunedin ==
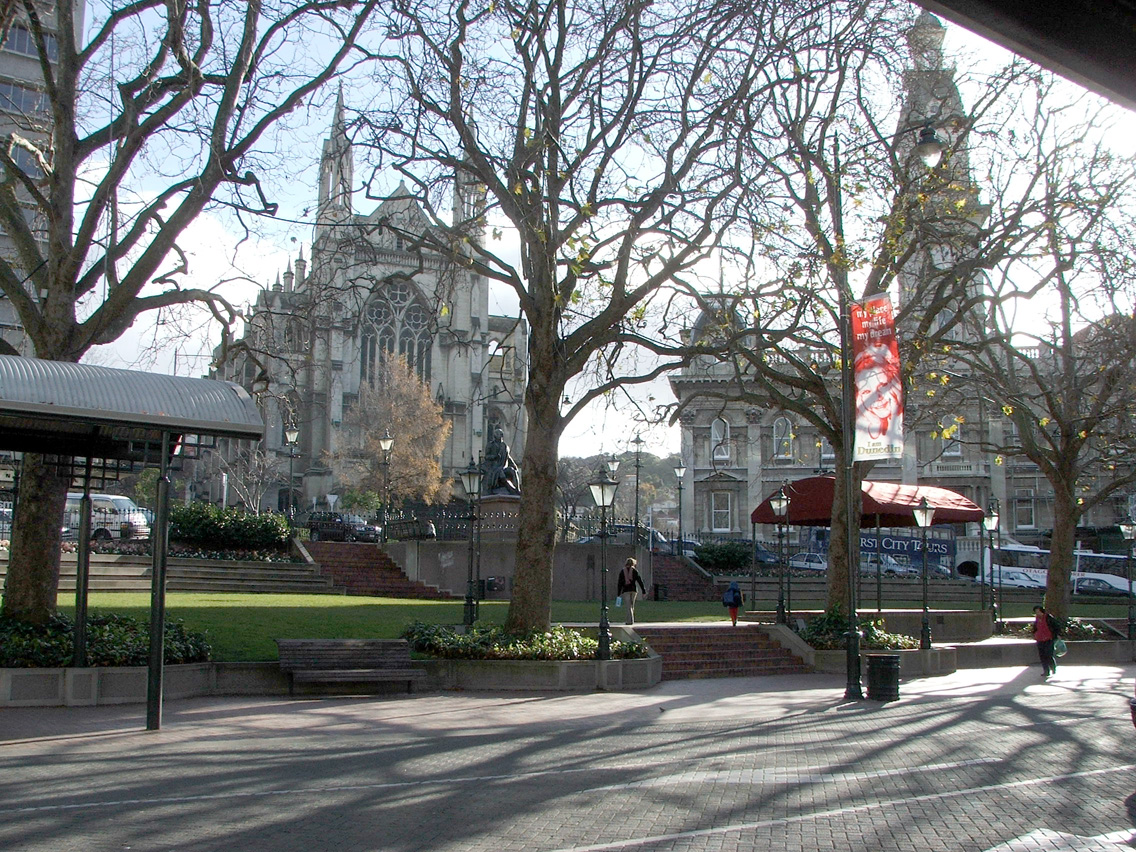
The Octagon, looking towards St. Paul's Cathedral (left) and the Municipal Chambers (right). The Robert Burns statue is visible in front of the cathedral.

The Lay Association of the Free Church of Scotland founded Dunedin at the head of Otago Harbour in 1848 as the principal town of its Scottish settlement. The name comes from Dùn Èideann, the Scottish Gaelic name for Edinburgh, the Scottish capital. Charles Kettle the city's surveyor, instructed to emulate the characteristics of Edinburgh, produced a striking, 'Romantic' design. The result was both grand and quirky streets as the builders struggled and sometimes failed to construct his bold vision across the challenging landscape. Captain William Cargill, a veteran of the war against Napoleon, was the secular leader. The Reverend Thomas Burns, a nephew of the poet Robert Burns, was the spiritual guide.

The Octagon was first laid out during Charles Kettle's surveying of the city in 1846. His plans for the centre of Dunedin included a large Octagonal area (Moray Place) enclosing a smaller octagonal shape, originally designated as a reserve. Despite the reserve status, the Church of England sought to build in the centre of the Octagon, applying directly to Governor Sir George Grey. It was not until building was about to commence that the local (predominantly Scottish and Presbyterian) community became aware of what was happening. This resulted in a major furore within the city. Otago Superintendent William Cargill was put in charge of the dispute, resulting in the Anglicans being forced to withdraw their plans for The Octagon (The Anglican St. Paul's Cathedral stands today at the northern edge of The Octagon).

Many of the suburbs of Dunedin are named after their Edinburgh equivalents.

== Otago Highlanders ==
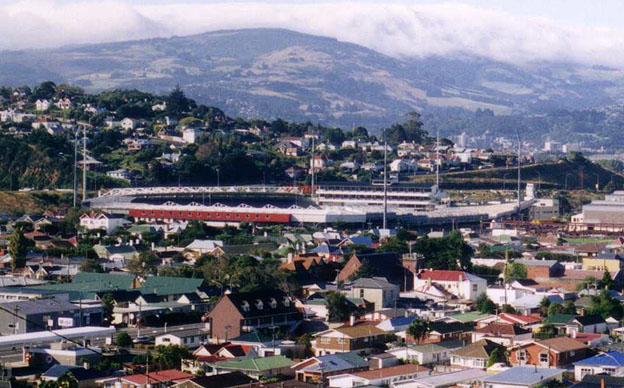
Carisbrook, home ground of the Highlanders in Dunedin

Dunedin's main rugby union team are called The Highlanders. The name Highlanders was chosen after the early Scottish settlers in the lower South Island. These Scottish settlers were the founders of Dunedin—known as the "Edinburgh of the South", and the city where the Highlanders are based. According to the Highlanders official website: " The name and image of the Highlander conjures up visions of fierce independence, pride in one's roots, loyalty, strength, kinship, honesty, and hard work." The colours of the Highlanders encompasses the provincial colours of North Otago, Otago, and Southland; yellow, blue and maroon. Blue is also the predominant colour of the Flag of Scotland, and is used by many sports teams in that country.

== University of Otago ==
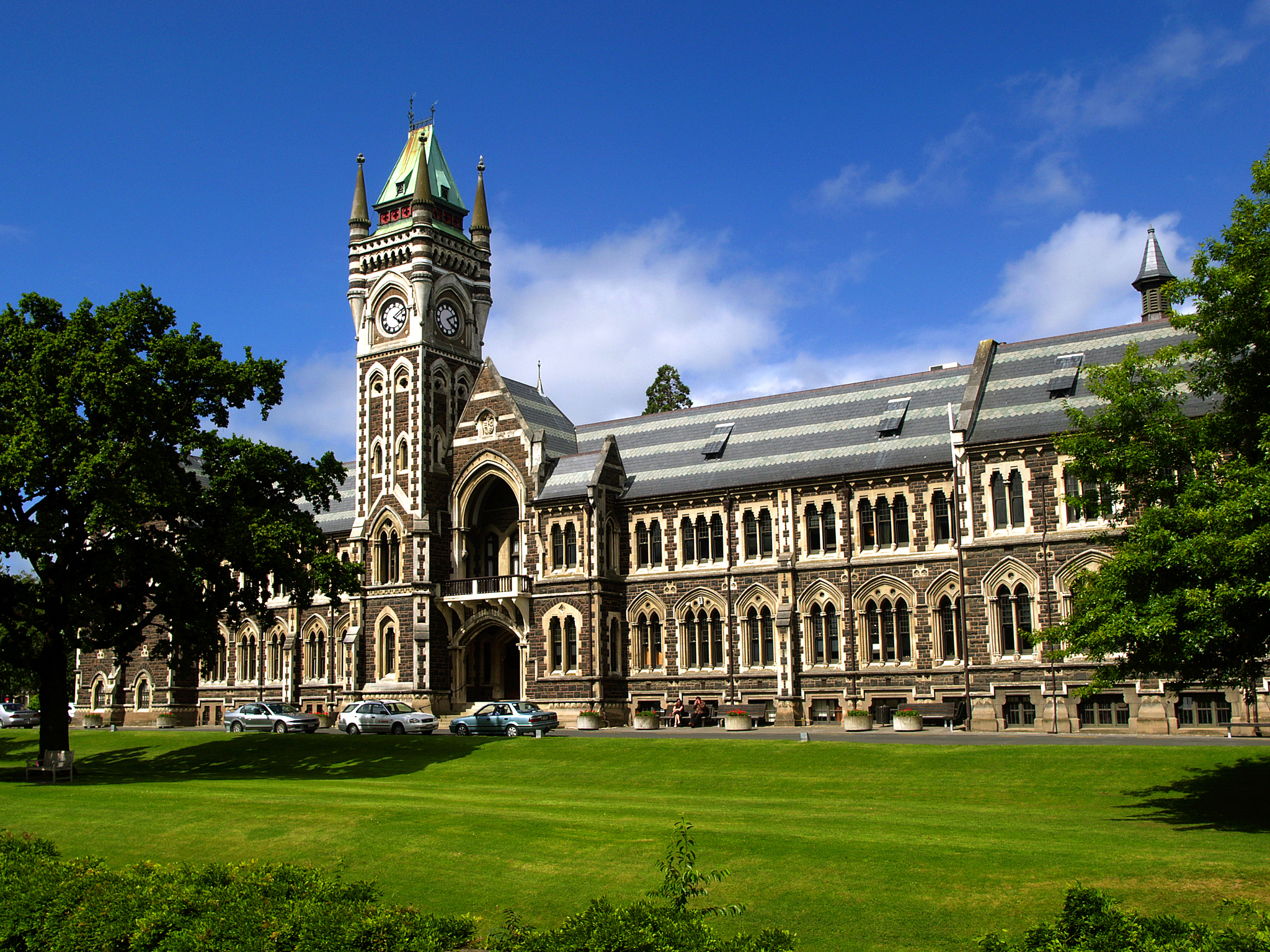
The University clocktower, looking east.

Dunedin founders Thomas Burns and James Macandrew urged the Otago Provincial Council during the 1860s to set aside a land endowment for an institute of higher education. An ordinance of the council established the university in 1869, giving it 100,000 acres (400 km^{2}) of land, and the power to grant degrees in Arts, Medicine, Law and Music. Burns was named Chancellor, but he did not live to see the university open on 5 July 1871. The university issued just one degree before becoming an affiliate college of the federal University of New Zealand in 1874. With the dissolving of the University of New Zealand in 1961 and passage of the University of Otago Amendment Act 1961, the university regained authority to confer degrees.

The University's coat of arms was granted by the Lord Lyon King of Arms on 21 January 1948, and features a yellow saltire, on blue.

== Notable Scottish New Zealanders ==
See also – Category:New Zealand people of Scottish descent

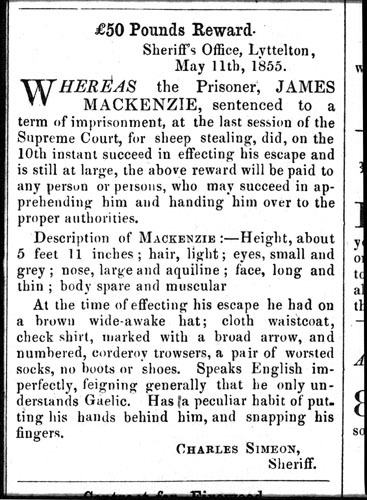
Reward poster for James Mckenzie published in The Lyttelton Times in May 1855 after he escaped from prison where he was being held for stealing sheep; note reference to language

- Janet Frame, author
- John Barr, poet, wrote in Lallans
- Norman McLeod (minister)
- Katie Sadleir, Olympian, born Torphins
- Elizabeth Yates (mayor)
- Alistair Campbell (poet)
- James Keir Baxter, writer
- Winston Peters, New Zealand First politician, of Scottish and Māori roots
- Minnie Dean (1844–1895) murderer, and the only woman to receive the death penalty in New Zealand, born Greenock
- James Mckenzie, possibly born in Ross-shire, Scotland, in 1820 was a New Zealand outlaw who has become one of the country's most enduring folk heroes; the Mackenzie Basin in the central South Island is named for him
- Kate Sheppard, suffragist, born in Liverpool, England to Scottish parents
- George Smith Duncan, engineer
- Elizabeth Grace Neill, lobbied for passage of laws requiring training and registration of nurses and midwives in New Zealand
- Bret McKenzie, one-half of the comedy duo Flight of the Conchords
- Calum Hood, bassist in 5 Seconds of Summer
- John Logan Campbell, politician
- John Rae (musician)
- Rita Angus, painter

=== Prime Ministers ===
Many of the prime ministers of New Zealand have been of Scottish descent. They include:

- Robert Stout (1844–1930), born Lerwick
- Thomas Mackenzie (1854–1930), born Edinburgh
- Peter Fraser (1884–1950), born Tain
- Edward Stafford (politician), on three occasions in the mid-19th century, born Edinburgh
- Sir John Ross Marshall (New Zealand politician), (1912-1988)

=== "Kilted Kiwis" ===
"Kilted Kiwi" is a nickname given to New Zealanders who would go on to play in the Scotland national rugby union team. They have had a mixed reception, but have included some notable players. The original "kilted Kiwi" was Sean Lineen. However one of the first New Zealand born Scotland players was Andrew Alexander Bonar Lindsay, who played 2 tests in 1910-11. To qualify, they either have to have at least one Scottish parent or grandparent.

Other so-called "kilted Kiwis" apart from Sean Lineen have included:

- Brendan Laney
- John Leslie
- Martin Leslie
- Glenn Metcalfe
- Gordon Simpson
- Sean Maitland
- John Hardie
- Blair Cowan
- Hugh Blake
- Grayson Hart

However, this has not always been a one way trade. At least one All Black was born in Scotland – Angus Stuart.

== Scottish placenames ==
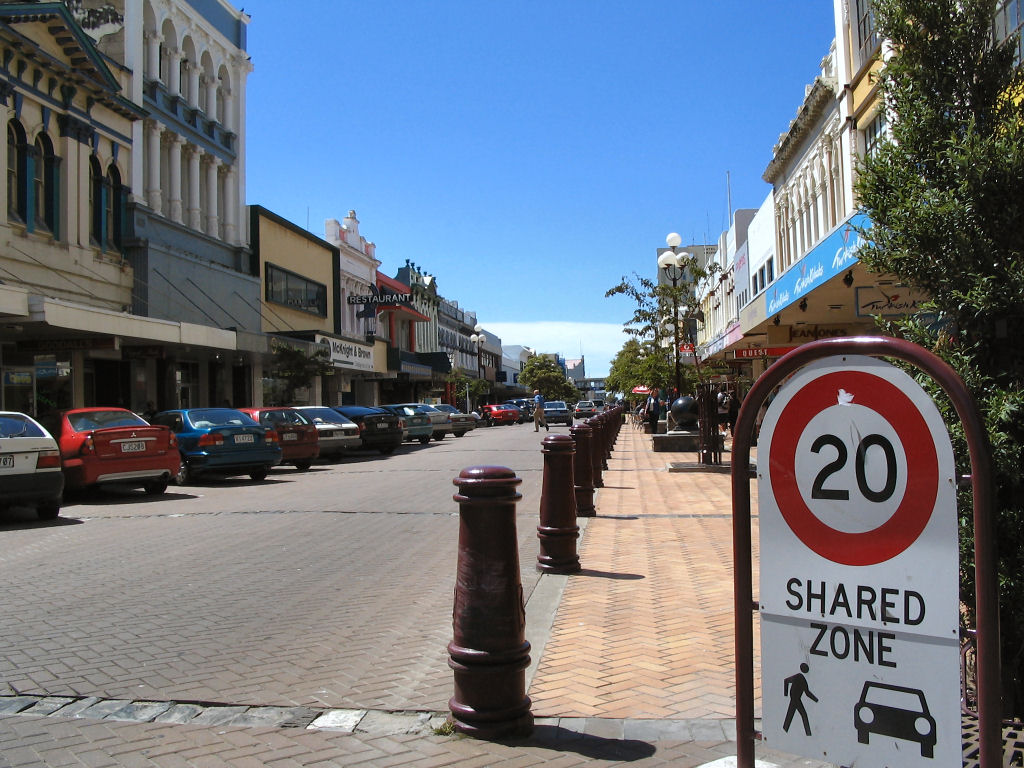
Cnr of Esk and Dee Streets, looking up Esk st, one of the main shopping streets of Invercargill.

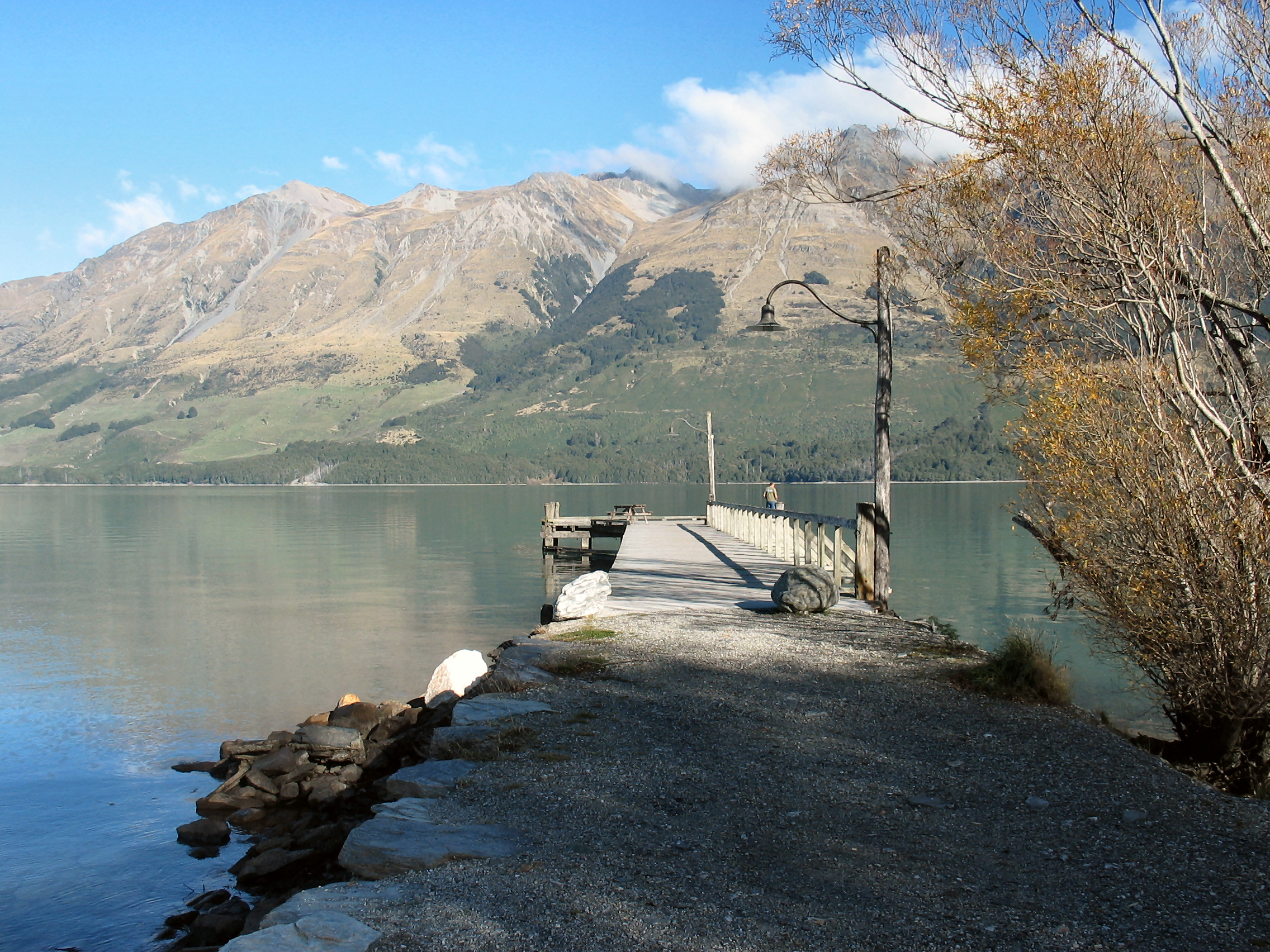
Looking at Lake Wakatipu from Glenorchy

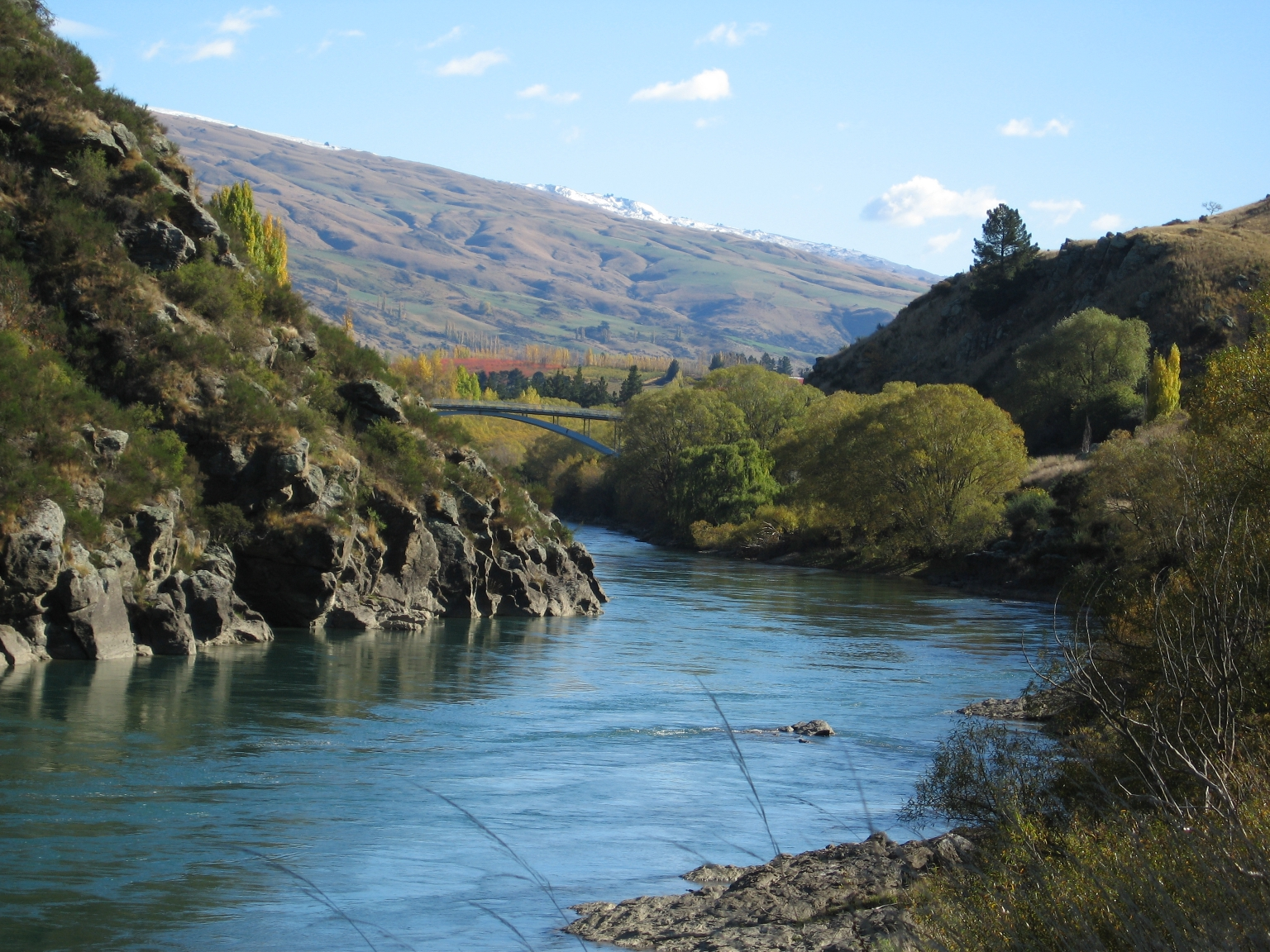
View of the Clutha River towards Roxburgh Bridge.

There are Scottish placenames all over New Zealand, but they tend to be concentrated in the southern part of South Island. Notable Scottish placenames in New Zealand include:

- North Island
  - Huntly
  - Napier
- South Island
  - Dunedin, from Dun Eideann, the Scottish Gaelic for Edinburgh. The town was originally to be called "New Edinburgh". Many of its street and suburb names mirror those of Edinburgh.
  - Invercargill, from "Inver" meaning a river mouth (an anglicisation of the Scottish Gaelic Inbhir), plus "Cargill"
  - Balclutha, from Baile Chluaidh meaning the town on the Clutha River (Abhainn Chluaidh – River Clyde)
  - Lammerlaw Range (mountains)
  - Lammermoor Range (mountains)
  - The Grampians (mountains)
  - Oban, the "capital" and only town of Stewart Island/Rakiura
  - Ulva Island
  - Water of Leith (river)

Many of the artificial lakes that have been formed as part of the Waitaki River hydroelectric scheme have also been given Scottish names, among them Lake Benmore and Lake Aviemore.

The South Island also contains the Strath-Taieri and the Ben Ohau Range of mountains, both combining Scots Gaelic and Māori origins. Invercargill has the appearance of a Scottish name, since it combines the Scottish prefix "Inver" (Inbhir), meaning a river's mouth, with "Cargill", the name of a Scottish official. (Many of Invercargill's main streets are named after Scottish rivers: Dee, Tay, Spey, Esk, Don, Doon, Clyde, etc.). Inchbonnie is a hybrid of Lowland Scots and Scottish Gaelic.

== In popular culture ==
- An Angel at My Table (1990), is a fictionalised film version of Janet Frame's autobiographical works, and deals with her family life.
- Black Sheep (2006), a comedy horror, which features the Oldfields, a family of Scottish New Zealanders who live on a farm called "Glenolden". The villain is called Angus, and it also features a scene in which haggis is being made.
- A novel based partly on James Mckenzie's life, Chandler's Run, by Denise Muir, was published in 2008.
- The Piano (1993) tells the story of a silent but strongwilled Scotswoman, Ada McGrath (played by Holly Hunter), whose father arranges a marriage to New Zealand frontiersman Alistair Stewart (portrayed by Sam Neill).

== See also ==
- Demographics of New Zealand
- Immigration to New Zealand
- Europeans in Oceania
- European New Zealanders
- History of New Zealand
- Pākehā
- Waipu Scottish Migration Museum
