= St Kilda Beach =

St Kilda Beach may refer to:

- St Kilda Beach, Victoria in Australia
- The western half of Ocean Beach, Otago in New Zealand
