= Kettle Park =

Community sports fields and former landfill site in Dunedin, New Zealand

- Interactive map of Kettle Park
- Type: Sports fields and recreational grounds
- Location: St Kilda, Dunedin, New Zealand
- Coordinates: 45.90845°S 170.50606°E
- Established: ~1960
- Owned by: Dunedin City Council
- Operated by: Dunedin City Council
- Status: Open

Kettle Park is a large recreational sports field complex in the suburb of St Kilda, Dunedin, New Zealand. It is primarily used for rugby and association football (soccer), and serves as the home ground for local sports clubs and community competitions. The park is notable not only for its sporting use but also for its history as a former coastal landfill site, part of which lies beneath the playing surfaces and adjacent dunes.

== Location ==
Kettle Park is situated on Victoria Road in the St Kilda area of southern Dunedin, bordering the dune system of Middle Beach and Ocean Beach. Its coastal position places it close to other recreational spaces in the suburb and within walking distance of the beach environment.

The park is one of a strip of recreational facilities running close to Dunedin's southern shore, including Marlow Park, Hancock Park, Tahuna Park, and Chisholm Park Golf Links.

== History ==
=== Landfill origins ===
The land that is now Kettle Park was used as a municipal landfill from roughly 1900 until the early 1950s, receiving a range of demolition, industrial and household waste typical of early twentieth‑century tips. After closure, the site was capped with soil and gradually repurposed for recreational use, although the presence of buried waste has remained an ongoing environmental and engineering consideration due to coastal erosion and contaminant risks.

Investigations by engineering and environmental consultants in the 2010s and 2020s revealed that the landfill material extends beneath the sports fields and into adjacent dunes, containing asbestos, heavy metals such as copper, lead, and zinc, and other mixed demolition waste. Due to its proximity to the beach and dune face, coastal erosion has periodically exposed parts of the capped landfill, prompting the Dunedin City Council to deploy temporary coastal protection measures and investigate long‑term remediation options.

=== Development as sports fields ===
Following its closure as a tip and capping with topsoil in the 1950s–60s, Kettle Park was progressively developed as a community open space with multiple marked grounds for rugby and soccer. Over time, it became a hub for club and school sport, particularly for rugby competitions and football matches. Because of its coastal exposure, windblown sand has occasionally posed challenges for play and facility maintenance.

== Name ==
The park is named in honour of Charles Henry Kettle (1821–1862), a surveyor who played a key role in the early planning of Dunedin in the mid‑19th century. Kettle's work shaping the city's layout has been recognised in several local place names and commemorations.

== Facilities ==
Kettle Park comprises several marked playing surfaces and associated facilities, including:

- Multiple rugby fields are used for senior and junior competitions
- Soccer pitches configured for community football clubs
- Floodlighting on selected fields for evening training and matches
- Changing rooms, toilets and showers adjacent to the grounds
- Perimeter access ways and spectator areas
- Support facilities used by local clubs for meetings and events

Facilities are administered by the Dunedin City Council, with booking arrangements coordinated through sports code contacts and local organisations.

== Sporting use ==
Kettle Park is a key venue in Dunedin's grassroots sporting ecosystem, hosting regular fixtures, training, and tournaments. It is especially associated with rugby union matches played by club sides, including the Dunedin Rugby Football Club, one of the city's longest‑running rugby organisations, with clubrooms located nearby on Moana Rua Road. Many junior, senior and community competitions across rugby and football codes use Kettle Park throughout the year.

== Environmental concerns and coastal management ==
The former landfill beneath Kettle Park remains a subject of ongoing environmental monitoring and potential remedial planning due to the risk of coastal erosion exposing buried contaminants. The Dunedin City Council has investigated mitigation strategies, including dune reinforcement and long‑term remediation plans that anticipate climate‑driven sea-level rise and storm impacts. Remediation cost estimates have run into the tens of millions of dollars in planning discussions due to the complexity of removing or stabilising historic waste beneath active recreational grounds.
