= Wests (drink) =

New Zealand beverage company

Wests NZ Limited
- Industry: Manufacturing, retail
- Founded: 1876
- Headquarters: Dunedin, New Zealand
- Products: Cordial; soft drinks; milkshakes
- Website: www.wests.co.nz

Wests Chocolade – one of the unusual flavours for which this brand is known.

Wests NZ is a manufacturer of soft drinks and cordials based in Dunedin, New Zealand. It is the oldest continuous manufacturer of soft drinks in New Zealand.

== History ==
Wests began production in 1876 when Tom West created a range of cordials in the back of his grocery store in Maclaggan Street, Dunedin. These proved popular with the city's inhabitants and provided growth for the fledgling business. Production expanded to include ginger beer in 1906, and in 1914 a purpose-built factory was constructed in Saint Kilda in the south of the city.

The business was owned by Alf and Kaye Loretan from 2007, before they sold it to Angela and Craig McFarlane in 2021.

== Products ==
Wests today produces soft drinks and cordials in a range of flavours, many of them unique to the brand. These include chocolade (chocolate-flavoured lemonade), RedZenergy (energy drink), cola and raspberry, and pineapple and pear. Wests also produce milkshake and slushy syrups, as well as postmix concentrates and soda syrup refills in a variety of flavours.

=== Sugar-free ===
Many of Wests' regular soft-drink flavours are also offered in sugar-free varieties, which has led to the company offering New Zealand's largest range of sugar-free soft drinks. Diet milkshake as well as soda syrup flavours have recently also been added to the company's sugar-free range.

== Factory shop ==
Located next to the production factory, Wests' factory shop offers the range of Wests' products as well as general convenience store products.

== See also ==
- Foxton Fizz
