= St Clair Surf Life Saving Club =

Surf lifesaving club based in St Clair, Dunedin, New Zealand

St Clair Surf Life Saving CLub
- Founded: 1911
- Type: Non-profit organization
- Location: Dunedin, New Zealand.
- Region served: Metropolitan Dunedin,
- Volunteers: 500
- Website: St Clair SLSC

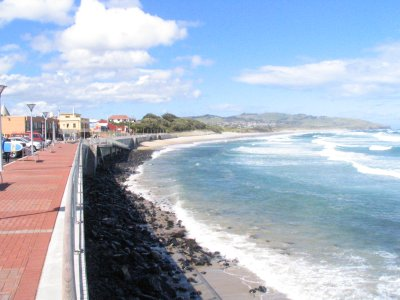
St Clair Beach, Dunedin.

St Clair Surf Life Saving Club (often shortened to St Clair SLSC) is a surf lifesaving club based at St Clair in Dunedin, New Zealand. The club is the largest of the six clubs based in the Otago region, and is one of 71 clubs nationwide. Established in 1911, St Clair has a long tradition of upholding the safety for visitors to Saint Clair Beach.

St Clair has a long tradition in surf sports events, and is a previous winner of the Nelson Shield. It has also supplied several members to the Surf Life Saving Otago representative programme. Club life member Duke Gilles was the inventor of the first mono-hulled surf canoe.

The club hosts an annual midwinter swim each year which attracts large crowds to the cool Pacific Ocean waters.

== Notable members ==
- David Gerrard
- Duke Gilles
- Chris Laidlaw

Dunedin

Climate chart (precipitation, max. and min. temperature)
J	F	M	A	M	J	J	A	S	O	N	D
73 19 12	59 19 11	70 18 10	62 15 8	68 13 6	69 10 4	61 10 3	55 11 4	49 13 6	64 15 7	67 16 9	76 18 10
- █ Average max. and min. temperatures in °C
- █ Precipitation totals in mm
Imperial conversion
J	F	M	A	M	J	J	A	S	O	N	D
2.9 66 54	2.3 66 52	2.8 64 50	2.4 59 46	2.7 55 43	2.7 50 39	2.4 50 37	2.2 52 39	1.9 55 43	2.5 59 45	2.6 61 48	3 64 50
- █ Average max. and min. temperatures in °F
- █ Precipitation totals in inches
