= St Clair, New Zealand =

Suburb of Dunedin, New Zealand

St Clair
- Suburb
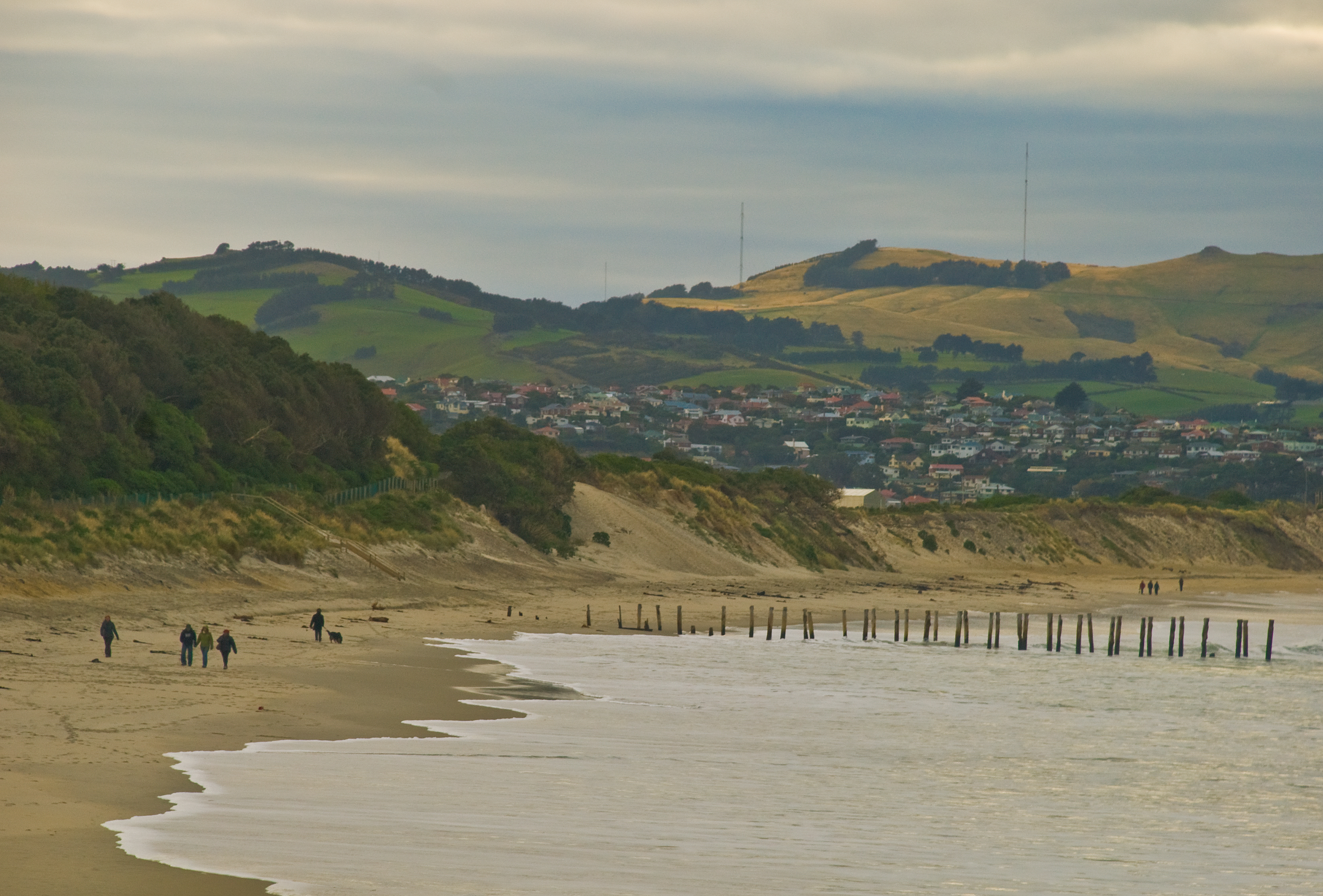
- St Clair Beach in 2009
- Interactive map of St Clair
- Coordinates: 45°54′40″S 170°29′10″E
- Country: New Zealand
- City: Dunedin
- Established: 1850s

Area
  - Land: 203 ha (500 acres)

Population (June 2025)
  - Total: 2,390
  - Density: 1,180/km^{2} (3,050/sq mi)

Corstorphine	Forbury, Kew	South Dunedin
St Clair Park	St Clair	St Kilda
	Pacific Ocean

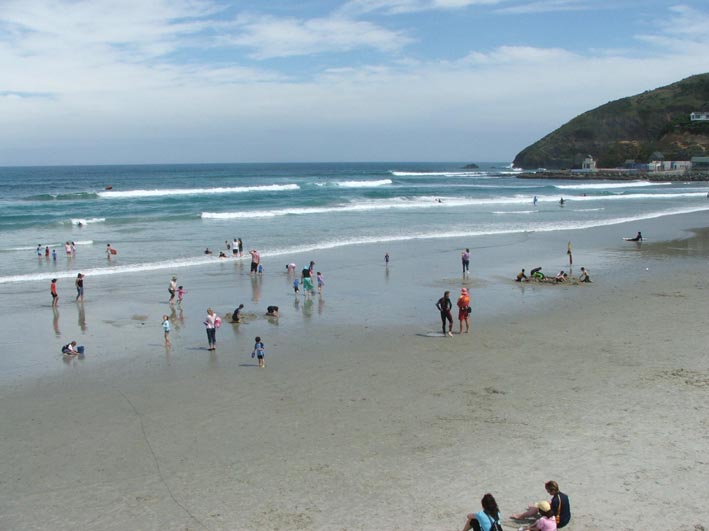
St Clair Beach, with the head of Forbury Hill in the background. The swimming pool is visible close to the ocean's edge at top right.

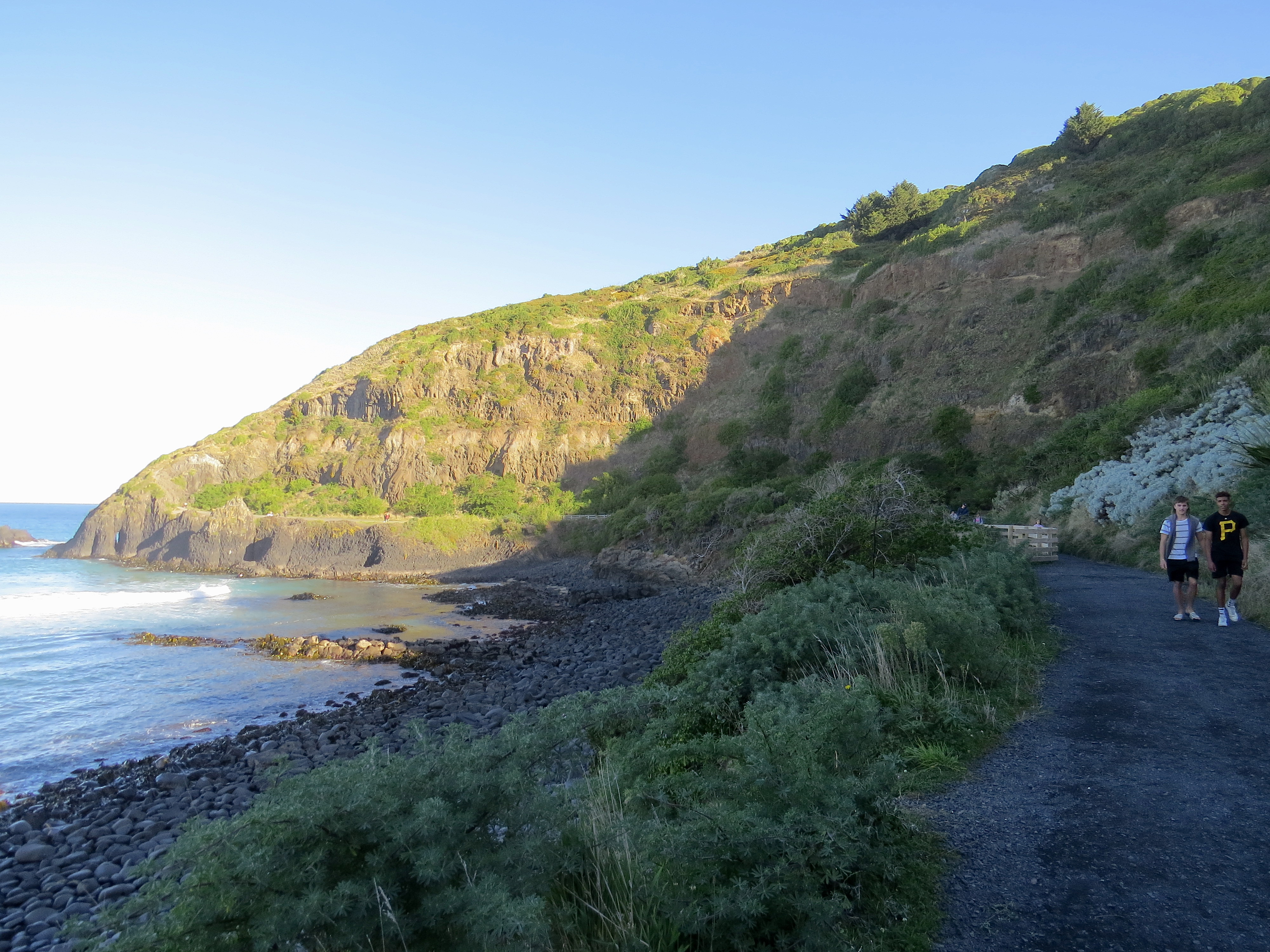
Second Beach and the head of Forbury Hill

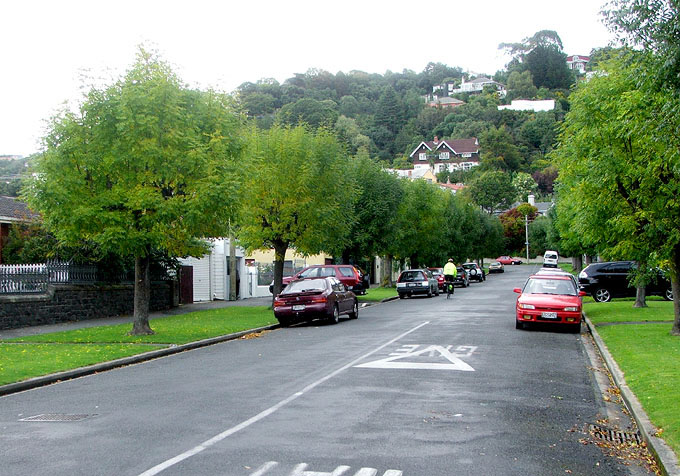
Valpy Street is named for the suburb's founding father, W.H. Valpy. His homestead was located close to the brown and white house on the slopes of Forbury Hill in the background of this picture.

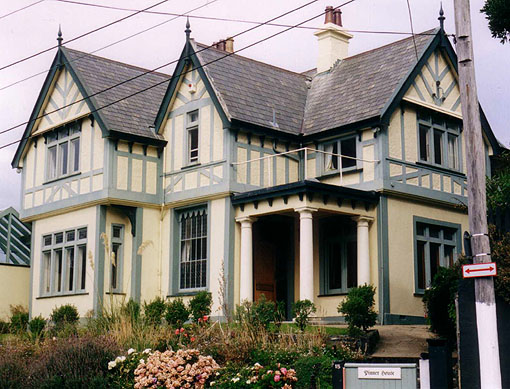
Pinner House, Cliffs Road, designed by F. W. Petre in Tudor Revival style

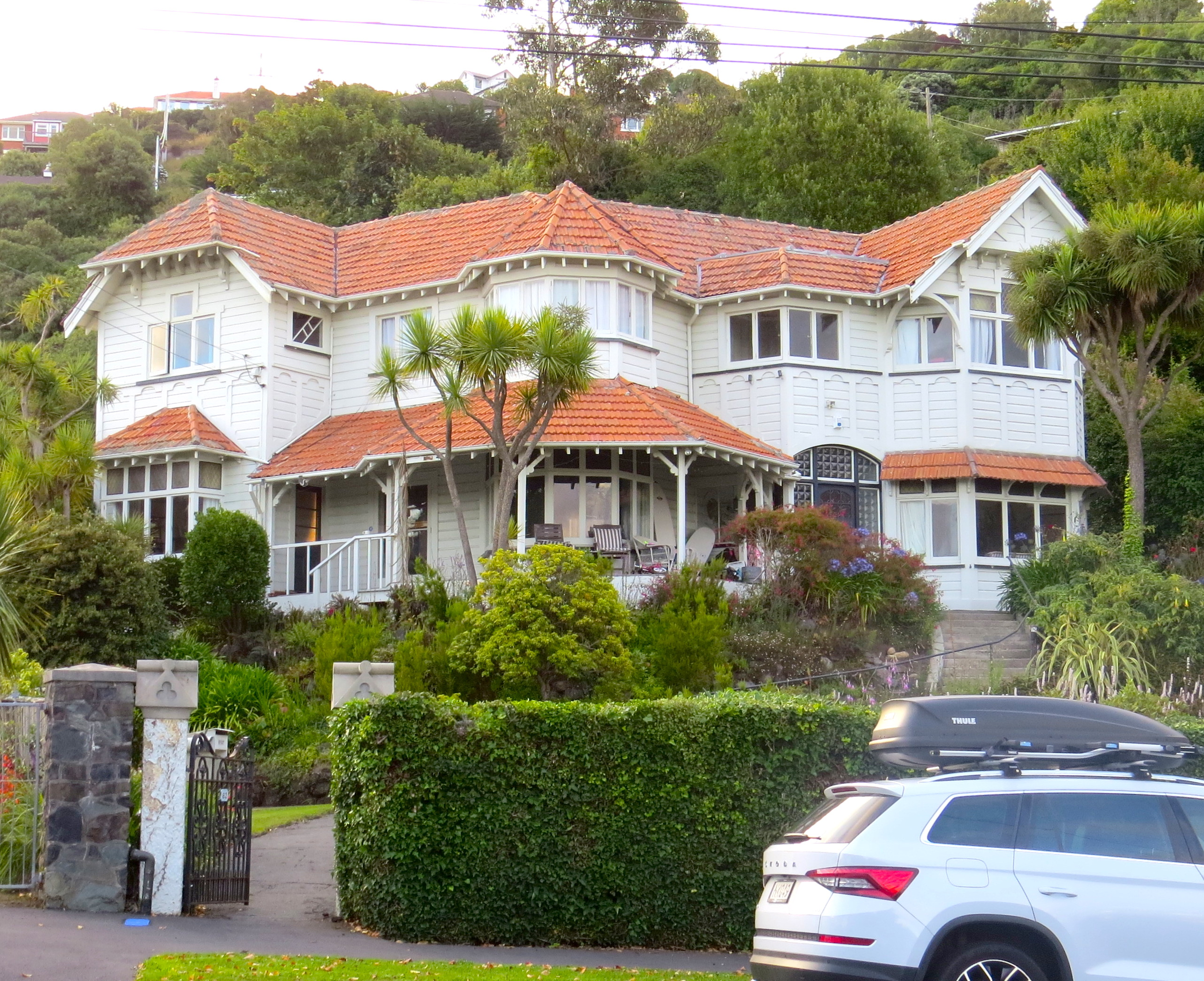
A prominent house in Norfolk Street, St Clair, was designed by architect John Burnside as his own family home

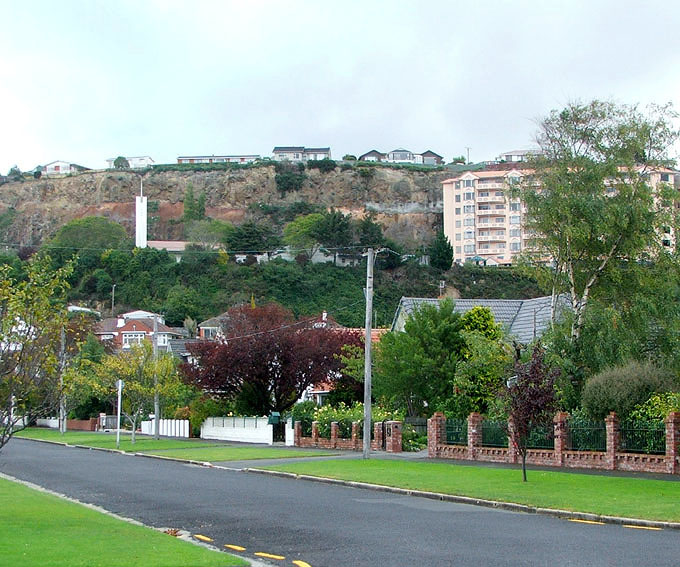
The Frances Hodgkins Retirement Village and the spire of Dunedin's LDS Church meetinghouse are visible against the cliffs of the former quarry that lies to the west of Forbury Road.

St Clair is a coastal residential suburb of Dunedin, New Zealand. It is located on the Pacific Ocean coast five kilometres from the city centre on the southwesternmost part of the coastal plain which makes up the southern part of the urban area, and also climbs the slopes of Forbury Hill immediately to the west of this plain. According to the New Zealand Census, St Clair's population in 2023 was 2,470.

== Geography ==
St Clair's main geographical features are St Clair Beach and the promontory of Forbury Hill, which rises 159 metres (522 ft) above the plain. The summit of the hill lies within the grounds of St Clair Golf Course, in the west of the suburb.

Forbury Hill's flanks include a large cliff face one kilometre inland from the beach and a rocky headland which juts into the Pacific Ocean. The small outcrop of White Island lies to the immediate south of St Clair beach. The inland cliff, which runs parallel with and to the west of Forbury Road, was the site of a quarry in the early days of the city. The city's largest retirement village and its only meetinghouse for the LDS Church both lie in the shadow of this cliff.

A small stream runs from the flank of Forbury Hill, passing into a culvert before reaching the sea at the western end of St Clair Beach. Bedford Street, a main thoroughfare from the flat part of the suburb to its hillier parts, follows the steep valley of this stream for much of its short length.

The suburb is surrounded by the suburbs of Corstorphine, Kew, Forbury, and St Kilda. Its main roads are Forbury Road, Bedford Street, Bay View Road, Ravenswood Road, and Allandale Road, with a small shopping area close to the junction of Allandale and Forbury Roads. Victoria Road, which begins at the edge of the suburb, also links it with St. Kilda. An esplanade runs along the coast from the southern end of Forbury Road (where it joins Bedford Street and Victoria Road), and is the site of several restaurants and cafes.

=== St Clair Beach ===
St Clair Beach is the suburb's most well-known feature. It is the western end of the long beach (Ocean Beach) which stretches along the city's southern shore, and is a popular surfing venue, regularly hosting national and South Island surfing championships. The beach at St Clair is backed by sea wall, behind which is an esplanade consisting of pedestrian walkway and a one-way street. The eastern end of the esplanade leads onto a pathway across the dunes which run along the back of the beach a far as St Kilda.

The beach and the dunes are often the victims of erosion if weather patterns see series of storms hit the city from the south. Such erosion between 2002 and 2007 saw emergency measures taken to add sand to the dunes in 2007 and 2008. Further erosion in 2013–2015 encroached on the dunes to the extent that a public footpath inland from the top of the dunes was permanently closed. The erosion is a long-term ongoing concern, as evidenced by attempts at beach protecting begun in 1904 which saw the addition of sturdy wooden piles and sandbreaks to the beach. The last surviving sets of wooden posts from these efforts were a landmark of St Clair Beach, often seen as being the dividing line between St Clair and Middle Beaches. Heavy storms during the winter of 2015 left these posts in a poor condition, and the last of the posts was washed away by 2021. Remedial work has to be frequently undertaken to shore up the dunes, and there is considerable local concern about the long-term viability of the residential area behind them. The presence of an old landfill immediately behind the dunes exacerbates the potential environmental problems from the erosion.

At their western end, St Clair Beach and esplanade culminate in a small promontory, immediately beneath which sits St Clair hot saltwater pool, a lido-style pool nestled within a natural rock outcrop.

=== Second Beach ===
Second Beach is a smaller beach lying around a promontory at the southwest end of St Clair Beach. It is rocky rather than sandy, and is flanked by a natural amphitheatre of cliffs. These cliffs include hexagonal basalt columns, one of three such outcrops in Dunedin (the others being at Blackhead, further to the west, and at the Organ Pipes formation on Mount Cargill. As with the main St Clair Beach, the area is popular with surfers, though the shoreline here is less easily accessible than at its neighbour.

A popular 800 metre-long walking track leads from behind the St Clair hot saltwater pool to cliffs at the head of Forbury Hill, along a ridge behind Second Beach. The walking track is well-tended, and traverses an area which was the site of quarrying operations from the early days of Dunedin until the 1950s. Only the overgrown remnants of concrete and stone walls remain of this today as indications of this history. The area has now been rewilded, with native species such as tī kōuka, taupata, ngaio, poroporo, hebe, and harakeke, alongside several introduced plants such as wild lupin and artemisia. The beach is often frequented by seals and sea-lions.

A distinctive feature of the area is a natural blowhole in the foot of Forbury Head, located close to the southwestern end of the walking track. From this point, there is a panoramic view eastward along Dunedin's southern coast and along the Pacific coast of Otago Peninsula as far as Lion's Head Rock and Tow Rock at the entrance to Sandfly Bay, 18 kilometres (11 miles) to the east. From the end of the track, a rough, steep climbing route continues around the edge of Forbury Head's cliffs.

The Second Beach track was closed throughout late 2024 after being heavily damaged and inundated with slips by October's record rainfall. Further, less extensive, damage was caused by storms in January 2026.

== History ==
There is known to have been Māori settlement in the area close to what is now St Clair Esplanade in pre-European times, with artefacts having been discovered close to the western end of the Esplanade and also occasionally uncovered in the dunes which lie to the east. It is believed that there was also a burial site close to Cargill's Castle. A major pre-European track led along the length of the dunes and from there over Forbury Hill to connect with the land to the south.

The name Whakaherekau was used by Māori for the coastal strip encompassing parts of what are now St Kilda and St Clair. This has been translated as meaning either "to make a conciliatory present" or "a prepared snare that caught nothing".

Early European settlement in the area was led by William Henry Valpy (1793–1852). Valpy and his family arrived in New Zealand in 1849, setting up a 48 ha (120 acres) farm property centred on what are now Valpy Street and Norfolk Street. The property was named "The Forbury" after Forbury Gardens, a public gardens in Reading, Berkshire. Valpy was born in Reading, where his father Richard Valpy had been a schoolmaster. Valpy was reputedly the wealthiest man in New Zealand.

Chinese settlers were notable among early residents in the St Clair area, and largely through their effort the swampy land inland from the beach was drained, and converted into market gardens. Much of the young city's vegetable production was centred on Chinese allotments in an area close to what is now Macandrew Road, Forbury. Habitation remained sparse until the early twentieth century, but rapid growth immediately prior to World War I saw the population expand.

The suburb was largely populated by the city's more wealthy residents, with impressive houses by Francis Petre built close to the beach in Cliffs Road, two of which survive. Noted early residents included the Petres, the Cargills, the Sideys (including Sir Thomas Sidey), and the McIndoes. The McIndoe family included the founder of one of the city's main printing firms, John McIndoe, and Sir Archibald McIndoe, a pioneer in the field of plastic surgery.

There was also major industry in the early days of the suburb, with both horticulture and quarrying being of importance. The latter supplied many of the materials for C & W Shiel's brickworks, one of the early city's most important industries. The brickworks lay on the eastern side of Forbury Road with a quarry to the west (the quarry is now the site of the LDS Church meetinghouse and the Francis Hodgkins Retirement village); the brickworks were fed via a conveyor over a structure which bridged Forbury Road.

St Clair Beach has been a popular attraction for Dunedinites since the early days of the city. In 1912 a grandiose two-storeyed pavilion was erected on the esplanade, which was a popular if short-lived structure, burning to the ground in 1915. The site of the pavilion was later used for a band rotunda, though it too has long gone.

The cliffs above Second Beach were the site of a gun battery – part of a coastal defence system – from the 1880s until the end of World War I. Nothing now remains of the battery, the site of which was later subdivided for residential use as part of Cliffs Road.

In May 2013, the suburb's esplanade began collapsing, with numerous sinkholes appearing in the walkway. Walls meant to block off the sea, built in 2004 to replace those built in the 1880s and 1914, were leaking. The Esplanade was repaired, but erosion of the dunes immediately to the east continues, threatening the long-term viability of coastal properties in the vicinity.

== Modern St Clair ==
St Clair Beach is a popular summer destination for Dunedinites. It is one of the South Island's more popular surfing venues and is also home to the St Clair Surf Life Saving Club. At the western end of the beach, under the shadow of Forbury Hill, lies the St Clair Hot Salt Water Pool, an open-air public swimming pool nestled within rocks a handful of metres from the sea. The beach is also the site of the city's annual "midwinter plunge", which sees residents brave the chilly waters every year at the winter solstice. The beach's sea wall, esplanade and oceanway were rebuilt and renovated in 2004. In recent years the esplanade area has become a hub of culture with many cafes, restaurants and bars.

One of the city's wealthier suburbs, many fine houses are situated in the upper part of St Clair on the slopes of Forbury Hill. This part of the suburb is often referred to as St Clair Park, possibly a reference to the St Clair golf course – one of the city's main courses – which straddles the top of the hill. Near to this are the ruins of Cargill's Castle, a former stately home built for early settler Edward Cargill in 1877. As a residential suburb, industrial activity in 21st-century St Clair is negligible.

== Demographics ==
St Clair covers 2.03 km^{2} (0.78 sq mi) and had an estimated population of 2,390 as of June 2025, with a population density of 1,177 people per km^{2}.

Historical population
Year	Pop.	±% p.a.
2006	2,355	—
2013	2,346	−0.05%
2018	2,346	+0.00%

St Clair had a population of 2,346 at the 2018 New Zealand census, unchanged since the 2013 census, and a decrease of 9 people (−0.4%) since the 2006 census. There were 897 households, comprising 1,119 males and 1,227 females, giving a sex ratio of 0.91 males per female. The median age was 44.7 years (compared with 37.4 years nationally), with 405 people (17.3%) aged under 15 years, 402 (17.1%) aged 15 to 29, 1,107 (47.2%) aged 30 to 64, and 438 (18.7%) aged 65 or older.

Ethnicities were 90.5% European/Pākehā, 9.7% Māori, 3.2% Pasifika, 4.9% Asian, and 3.1% other ethnicities. People may identify with more than one ethnicity.

The percentage of people born overseas was 21.7, compared with 27.1% nationally.

Although some people chose not to answer the census's question about religious affiliation, 55.8% had no religion, 36.3% were Christian, 0.1% had Māori religious beliefs, 0.3% were Hindu, 0.4% were Muslim, 0.6% were Buddhist and 1.5% had other religions.

Of those at least 15 years old, 744 (38.3%) people had a bachelor's or higher degree, and 225 (11.6%) people had no formal qualifications. The median income was $40,500, compared with $31,800 nationally. 489 people (25.2%) earned over $70,000 compared to 17.2% nationally. The employment status of those at least 15 was that 990 (51.0%) people were employed full-time, 288 (14.8%) were part-time, and 57 (2.9%) were unemployed.

== Education ==
St Clair School is a state contributing primary school serving years 1 to 6 with a roll of 359 students. The school was established in 1896. The twin single-sex secondary schools of King's and Queen's lie close to the point where St Clair, St Kilda and Forbury meet.

There are several creches and kindergartens in and around St Clair; the headquarters of umbrella organisation Dunedin Kindergartens is based on Forbury Road in Forbury just to the north of St Clair.

== See also ==
- Suburbs of Dunedin
