= St Kilda, New Zealand =

Suburb of Dunedin, New Zealand

St Kilda
- Suburb
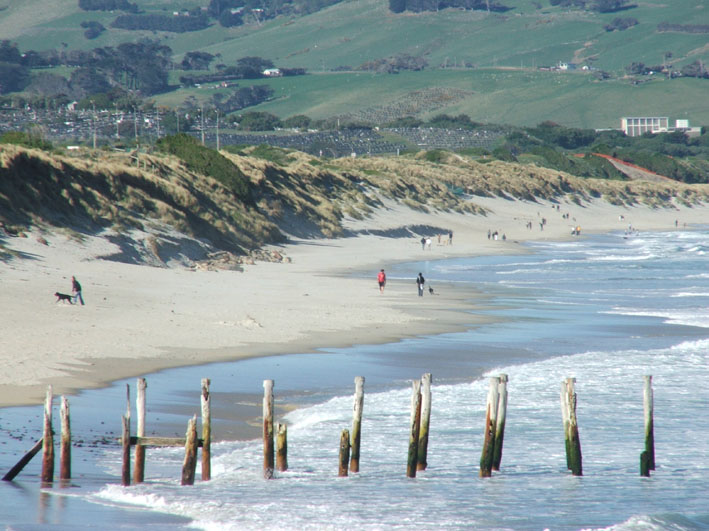
- Looking east along Middle Beach and St Kilda Beach
- Interactive map of St Kilda
- Coordinates: 45.9048°S 170.5009°E
- Country: New Zealand
- City: Dunedin
- Local authority: Dunedin City Council

Area
  - Land: 219 ha (540 acres)

Population (June 2025)
  - Total: 5,520
  - Density: 2,520/km^{2} (6,530/sq mi)

Forbury	South Dunedin	Musselburgh
	St Kilda	Tainui
St Clair	(Pacific Ocean)

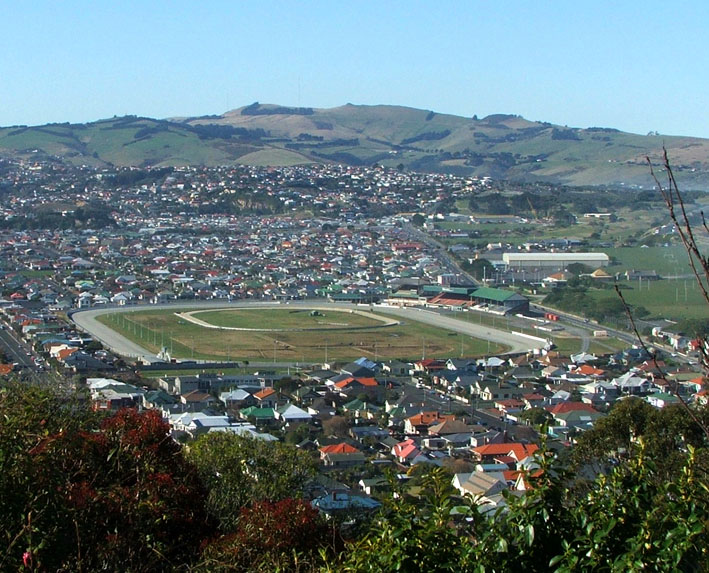
Looking across Forbury Park and southern St Kilda from the west. The large white building in the upper right of the picture is Dunedin Ice Stadium, with Marlow Park immediately to its right.

St Kilda is a suburb of the New Zealand city of Dunedin. A densely populated residential suburb, it lies on the southern part of the city's central plain, to the southwest of the head of the harbour and immediately north of Ocean Beach, parts of which (St Kilda Beach and Middle Beach) are within the suburb and form its major geographical feature. According to the New Zealand Census, St Kilda's 2023 population was 5,710.

== Geography ==
The suburb has fairly well-defined boundaries, having been a separate borough from 1875 until the time of local government restructuring in 1989. The borough was bounded by Forbury Road in the west, Bay View Road in the north, and Royal Crescent in the east, and at the time of its amalgamation into Dunedin City, was the most densely populated borough in New Zealand. Much of the borough's growth was between 1900 and 1930, during which time the population rose from around 1500 to 8000, slowly declining from that time to its current figure. Many of St Kilda's houses date from this period.

St Kilda was named for the Melbourne suburb by early property developer George Scott, who had arrived in New Zealand from Victoria in 1862. The area was previously known by the Māori name Whakahekerau.

St Kilda gave its name to a New Zealand electoral constituency which covered much of southern Dunedin and the Otago Peninsula. This electorate existed from 1946 to 1993 (after which it was replaced by the Dunedin South electorate), and was represented in turn by Fred Jones (Labour, 1946–1951), Sir James Barnes (National, 1951–1957), Bill Fraser, (Labour, 1957–1981), and Michael Cullen (Labour, 1981–1993).

St Kilda is surrounded by the suburbs of St Clair, Forbury, Caversham, South Dunedin, Musselburgh and Tainui. Other major streets in St Kilda include Prince Albert Road in the east (which contains most of the suburb's few shops), Queens Drive, Richardson Street and Victoria Road, the last of which runs along the southern shore, separated from the Pacific Ocean by wide high dunes. The Sir James Barnes Memorial Lookout is located close to the highest point of the dunes and commands views across the plain on which St Kilda lies and the surrounding parts of the city.

== Infrastructure and community ==
The streets of St Kilda form a grid pattern which is interrupted by a long crescent (Hargest Crescent), which runs around the original boundary of the city's main horse racing venue, Forbury Park (the park was reduced to its current size in 1909). The suburb also contains the Dunedin Ice Stadium, an Olympic-sized ice-skating rink and several sports fields, notably De Carle Park, Marlow Park, Kettle Park, and Hancock Park. Chisholm Park Golf Course also lies partly within St Kilda. St Kilda has three pubs, a bowling green, tennis courts, and a badminton hall. Though it contains no secondary schools, the paired single-sex King's High School and Queen's High School lie close to its northern edge.

St Kilda is also the home of the St Kilda Sentinel Brass Band, Pirates Rugby Club, Otago Model Engineering Society, Ocean Beach Railway, St Kilda Surf Lifesaving Club, Hot Rod Club and Ocean Beach Scout Group. Being mainly residential, there are few notable industries within the suburb, an exception being Wests, a soft drink manufacturers located in Bay View Road.

== Demographics ==
St Kilda covers 2.19 km^{2} (0.85 sq mi) and had an estimated population of 5,520 as of June 2025, with a population density of 2,521 people per km^{2}.

Historical population
Year	Pop.	±% p.a.
2006	5,259	—
2013	5,298	+0.11%
2018	5,502	+0.76%

St Kilda had a population of 5,502 at the 2018 New Zealand census, an increase of 204 people (3.9%) since the 2013 census, and an increase of 243 people (4.6%) since the 2006 census. There were 2,328 households, comprising 2,586 males and 2,910 females, giving a sex ratio of 0.89 males per female, with 984 people (17.9%) aged under 15 years, 1,086 (19.7%) aged 15 to 29, 2,313 (42.0%) aged 30 to 64, and 1,119 (20.3%) aged 65 or older.

Ethnicities were 84.3% European/Pākehā, 12.0% Māori, 5.6% Pasifika, 7.0% Asian, and 2.9% other ethnicities. People may identify with more than one ethnicity.

The percentage of people born overseas was 17.6, compared with 27.1% nationally.

Although some people chose not to answer the census's question about religious affiliation, 54.2% had no religion, 33.5% were Christian, 0.3% had Māori religious beliefs, 0.8% were Hindu, 1.0% were Muslim, 0.9% were Buddhist and 2.5% had other religions.

Of those at least 15 years old, 846 (18.7%) people had a bachelor's or higher degree, and 1,041 (23.0%) people had no formal qualifications. 363 people (8.0%) earned over $70,000 compared to 17.2% nationally. The employment status of those at least 15 was that 1,974 (43.7%) people were employed full-time, 600 (13.3%) were part-time, and 195 (4.3%) were unemployed.

Individual statistical areas
Name	Area (km^{2})	Population	Density (per km^{2})	Households	Median age	Median income
St Kilda South	1.14	2,964	2,600	1,236	36.9 years	$27,800
St Kilda North	1.06	2,538	2,394	1,092	43.0 years	$24,200
New Zealand					37.4 years	$31,800

== Mayors of St Kilda Borough ==
St Kilda had its own mayor during its time as a borough between 1875 and 1989. The following is a list of holders.

	Name	Term
1	John Pugh Jones	1875–1877
2	Caleb Moore	1877–1878
(1)	John Pugh Jones	1878–1880
3	George Thomas Clarke	1880–1883
4	Hugh Gourley	1883–1888
5	James Stenhouse	1888–1890
(4)	Hugh Gourley	1890–1895
6	Thomas Shepherd Culling	1895–1900
7	Robert Mitchell	1900–1901
8	Gabriel Hodges	1901–1903
9	Charles Gore	1903–1904
10	James John Marlow	1904–1906
11	Bill Burk	1906–1908
12	William Thomas McFarlane	1908–1910
13	Donald Cameron	1910–1911
14	Hugh McMillan Ewing	1911–1912
15	Somerled Bartlett Macdonald	1912–1913
(12)	William Thomas McFarlane	1913–1917
16	Charles Nunn Scurr	1917–1918
17	Adam David Edgar	1918–1921
18	James William Dove	1921–1923
19	Charles Todd	1923–1925
20	Robert William Hall	1925–1929
21	John Beattie	1929–1934
(17)	Adam David Edgar	1934–1935
22	Herbert Hastings Leary	1935–1936
(10)	James John Marlow	1936–1941
23	Norman Douglas Anderson	1941–1947
24	William Rutherford	1947–1950
25	Alfred Harold Finnie	1950–1962
26	Richard Samuel Jones	1962–1968
27	Raymond George Pearson	1968–1974
28	Percy Bruce Jones	1974–1980
29	Ivan James Lawson	1980–1989
