= White Island (Otago) =

Island off the coast of Otago, New Zealand

White Island, Otago
Māori: Ponuiahine or 'Pomuiahine'
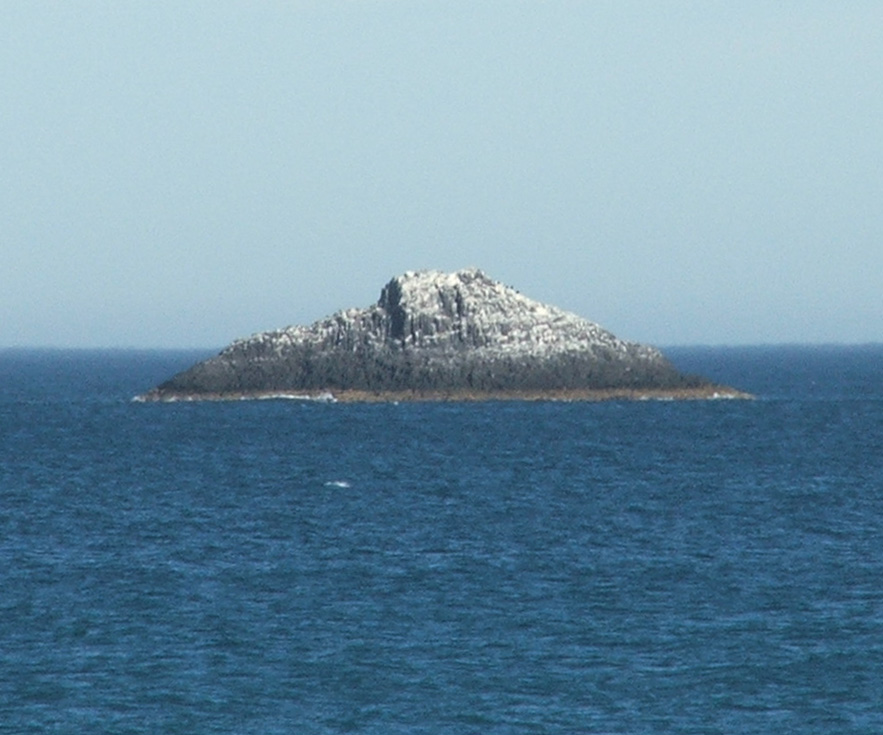
- White Island, as seen from St. Clair Beach
- Interactive map of White Island, Otago

Geography
- Coordinates: 45.933561°S 170.498572°E
- Area: 1,600 m^{2} (17,000 sq ft)
- Length: 80 m (260 ft)
- Width: 30 m (100 ft)
- Highest elevation: 15 m (49 ft)

Administration
- New Zealand

Demographics
- Population: 0

White Island (Māori: Pounui-a-Hine) is an island 2,500 metres (2,700 yd) off the coast of Otago, within the boundaries of the city of Dunedin, South Island, New Zealand. It is uninhabited, and is a well-known landmark visible from the city's two inner city beaches at St Clair and St Kilda. The island is 80 metres (87 yd) in length and 30 metres (33 yd) wide at its widest point, covering 1,600 square metres (17,000 sq ft) and rising to a height of approximately 15 metres (49 ft). A rocky reef, parts of which break the surface at low tide, extends for 100 metres (110 yd) from the western end of the island.

== Name ==
The island's Māori-language name is Ponuiahine – also given as 'Pomuiahine'. It has been translated literally (and "ridiculously" according to Griffiths and Goodall) as 'great night of the girl'. It should perhaps be 'Pou-nui-a-Hine' ('large post of Hine'), referring to a person called 'Hine', which was often a man's name.

== Ragged Rock ==
White Island may be the 'Ragged Rock' where the Sydney sealer Brothers, chartered by Robert Campbell and under the command of Robert Mason landed three men out of a gang of eleven in November 1809. William Tucker who later settled at Whareakeake (Murdering Beach), near Otago Heads, was in the gang. Alternatively Ragged Rock may be Green Island.

== 1826 sighting ==
On 1 May 1826 Thomas Shepherd, keeping a journal as he approached this coast as nurseryman to the first New Zealand Company's settlement expedition in the Rosanna, accompanied by the Lambton, said he 'saw two remarkable Sugar loaf Rocks in the sea near the shore about 100 feet (30 m) high'. A man was sent ashore and came back with a Māori man called Tatawa who 'said he belonged to Otago'. Shepherd later confirmed this was the part of the coast he was talking about. There is a reef south of White Island where the sea may be seen breaking. Presumably in the 1820s it too rose well above the sea. By the time of Dunedin's settlement in 1848 there was only the single island visible.

== See also ==
- Desert island
- List of islands of New Zealand
- Lists of islands
