= Ocean Beach, Otago =

Beach in Dunedin, New Zealand

Coordinates: 45°54′33″S 170°30′30″E

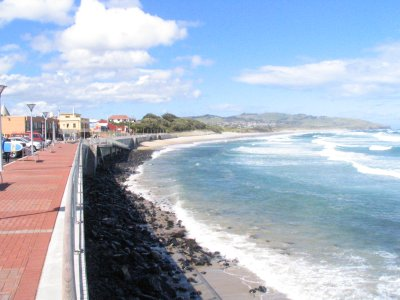
Ocean Beach from the western end of St Clair Esplanade.

Ocean Beach (Māori: Whakahekerau) is a long sandy beach which runs along the Pacific Ocean coast of south Dunedin, New Zealand. It stretches for some three kilometres from St Clair in the southwest along the coast of St Kilda to the foot of Lawyers Head in the east. The beach is a popular recreation area for swimming, surfing, and walking.

== Geography ==
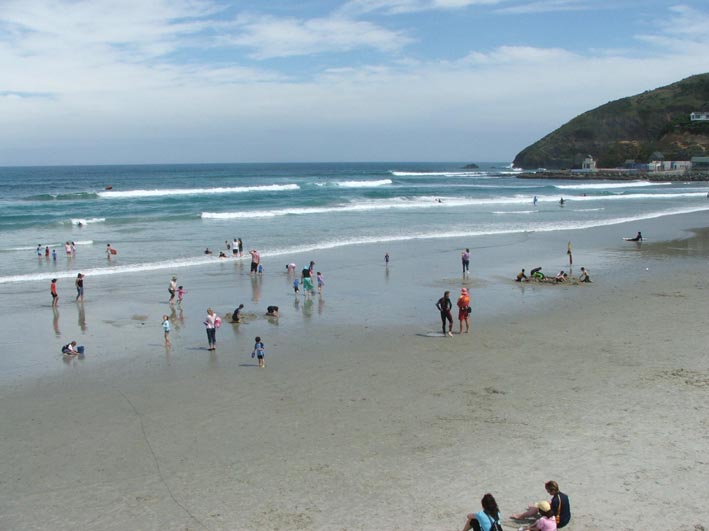
St Clair Beach. The salt-water pool is visible at top right.

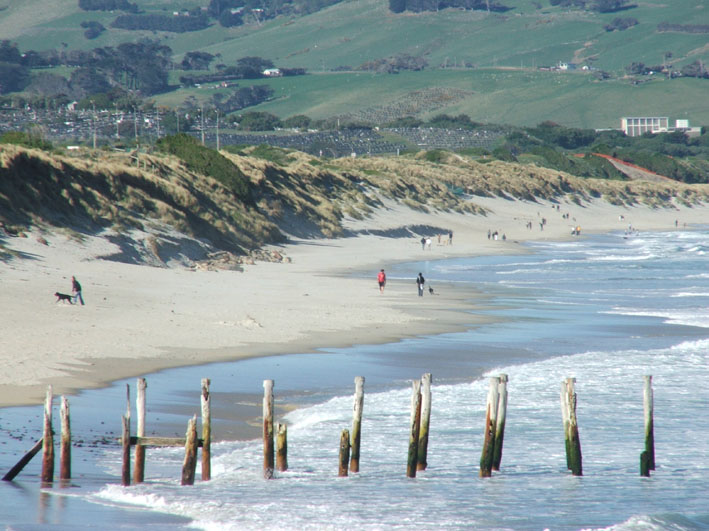
Looking past the posts at the end of St Clair Beach towards St Kilda. The dunes behind Middle Beach are clearly shown. Stormy seas in the early years of the 21st century reduced and finally removed the last remaining posts.

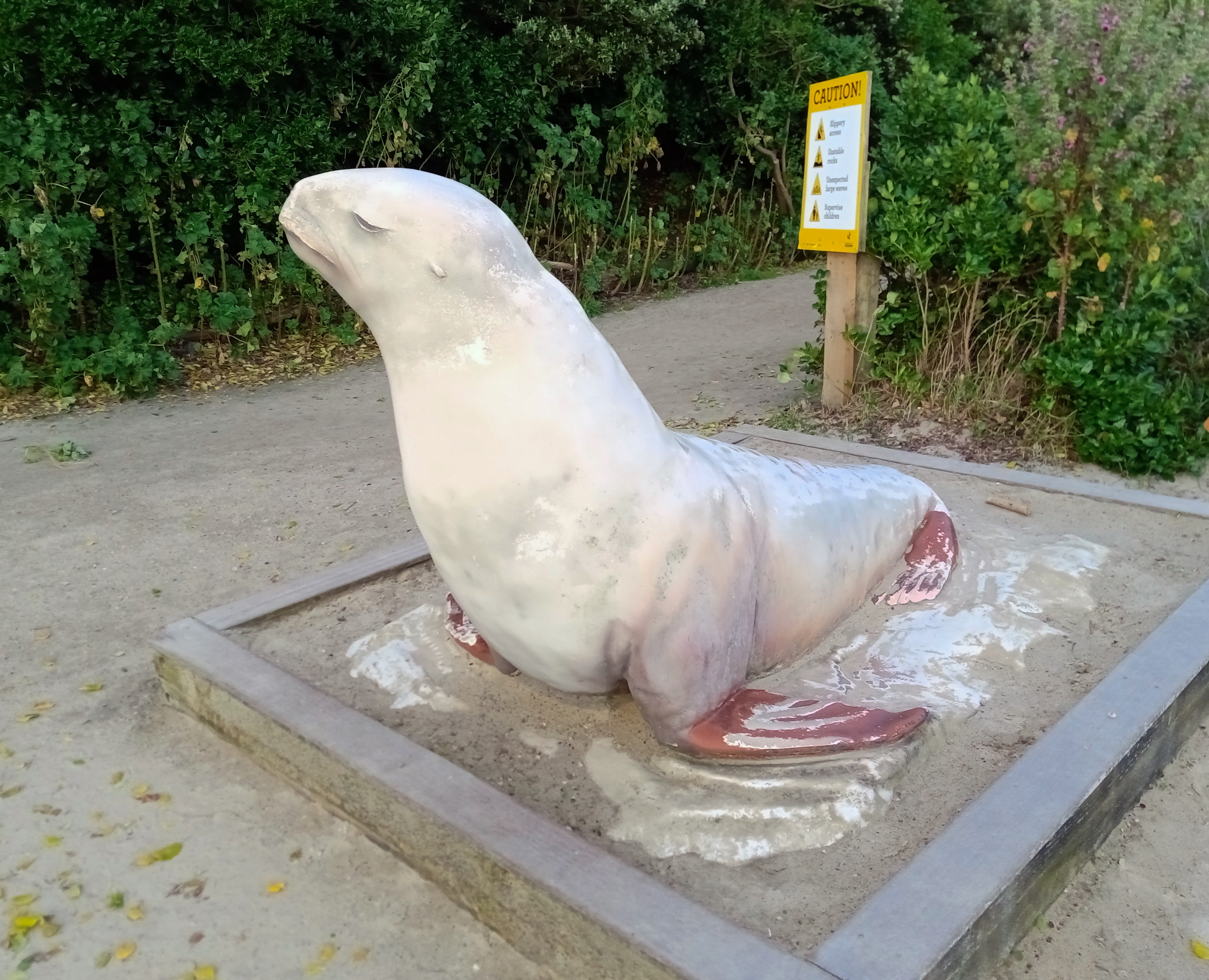
Statue of Mum by Bryn Jones, St Clair Esplanade

The beach is divided into three roughly equal lengths, known as St Clair Beach, Middle Beach, and St Kilda Beach. Access is easiest at the St Clair end, with steps and ramps down to the beach from St Clair Esplanade. The esplanade is the site of several cafes and restaurants. At its end, also the western end of the beach, is the St Clair salt-water swimming pool, the city's oldest pool, opened in 1884. The pool has been upgraded on several occasions, most recently in 2002. A short walking track leads southwest from the pool to Second Beach, a small stony beach sitting at the bottom of the basalt cliffs of Forbury Head.

St Clair Beach is a popular surfing venue, as well as having a patrolled swimming area. Shark nets have been deployed one kilometre out from the beach every summer since 1970, making this a safe swimming area. Major surf lifesaving and surfing championships are regularly hosted at St Clair Beach. The western end of St Clair Beach was marked for over a century by a series of old wooden posts, the remains of an old breakwater groyne. These posts are often erroneously thought by to be the remains of a jetty. During the Victorian and Edwardian eras, there were several groynes along the beach which protected it from erosion. The groynes fell into disrepair, with the last of the posts from the last groyne remaining in place until a major storm in the 2010s.

The other major access-point to the beach is at St Kilda, where a sandy slope leads down to the sea from the road. Here, too, is a patrolled swimming area. Between the two access points is Middle Beach. This is backed by a series of high dunes topped by a walkway linking St Clair Esplanade with the Sir James Barnes Lookout, which offers views across south Dunedin from above Forbury Park Raceway. Behind these dunes are several of the city's sports grounds, notably Kettle Park. The Ocean Beach Railway runs through these parks from the Otago Model Engineering Club's premises close to the St Kilda beach access point.

In recent years the dunes have been subject to severe erosion, and measures have been taken by the Dunedin City Council to reinforce them. This is not the first time that erosion has threatened properties along this stretch of Dunedin's coast. Heavy seas during the 1890s and early 1900s caused loss of land close to St Clair, and the current esplanade is sited along the line of the first sea wall to be built along this stretch of coast, built between 1911 and 1913.

== Wildlife ==
Despite being a well-frequented beach within an urban area, Ocean Beach is regularly visited by a wide array of wildlife. Both seals and sea lions are occasional visitors, as are blue penguins.

A 2015 fibreglass statue by Bryn Jones of Mum, a sea lion who repopulated the species along the Otago coast, is located at the east end of St Clair Esplanade, overlooking the tree cover near the promenade.

== See also ==
- White Island, Otago
- Tunnel Beach
