= 1979 Abbotsford landslip =

Landslide in Abbotsford, New Zealand

Coordinates: 45.897095°S 170.434739°E

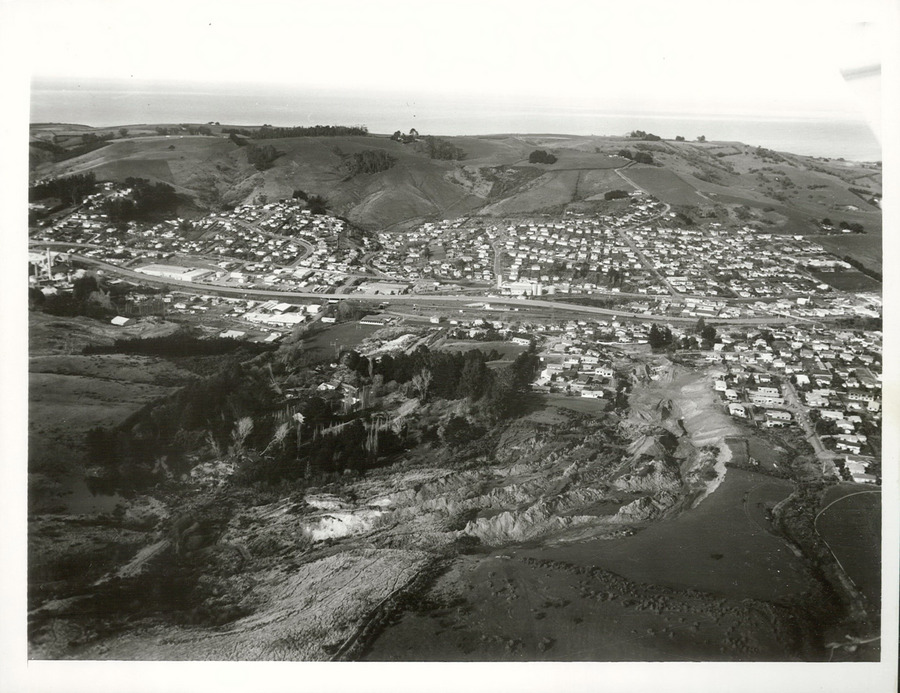
Aerial photo of Abbotsford landslip

On 8 August 1979, a major landslip occurred in the Dunedin, New Zealand, suburb of Abbotsford. It was the largest landslide in a built-up area in New Zealand's history, resulting in the destruction of 69 houses – around one sixth of the suburb – but no fatalities.

== Geography ==
The suburb of Abbotsford sits on the slopes of a hill in the southwest of Dunedin, separated from the main urban area by open semi-rural land. The larger suburb of Green Island sits on gentler slopes immediately to the south. Between the two lies the valley of the Kaikorai Stream and its tributary, Miller Stream. At the time of the slippage, Abbotsford was within Green Island Borough.

Much of the northeastern end of Abbotsford's residential area was built on unstable ground. Schist bedrock is covered with a thick layer of Abbotsford mudstone, with a top coating of sand and clay-rich Cenozoic alluvial soil (Green Island Loose Sand). This type of surface becomes slick during even moderate rainfall. Landslides of this type of material have been relatively widespread within the Greater Dunedin area throughout both recent prehistory and historical times.

The land was also sloping, and quarrying and the construction of the nearby Dunedin Southern Motorway during the 1960s and early 1970s may have further affected the land's stability. The event was non-seismic, the increased rainfall over the previous decade was the trigger and the slope gave way due to the clay seams that formed parallel to the bedding. The clay seams formed due to flexural slip.

== Background ==
There have been numerous smaller historical slips at Abbotsford, notably during the construction of the Dunedin-Mosgiel rail line in 1914. Despite this and a 1951 University of Otago report which stated that the land was unsuitable for building, the area was chosen as viable for residential subdivision. During subdivision, extra watercourses were built to handle excess rain runoff, but these proved insufficient to handle heavy downfalls. Christie Street, which runs up Abbotsford hill in the east of the suburb had existed before World War II, but the subdivision of land around it began in earnest only from 1953.

Several houses needed to be demolished because of slippage caused during the construction of the Dunedin Southern Motorway in 1966 and 1968. From 1968, cracks started appearing in houses in Christie Street, with evidence of subsidence and earth movement becoming more common in the following years. In November 1978, water mains ruptured in Christie Street, and in May 1979 the Green Island Borough Council had to replace drains which had separated by as much as 50 centimetres (20 in). This was followed by further breaks in both water and sewerage pipes during June. Between 1 July and 16 July, four houses were evacuated; six more were to become empty before the end of the month. During July, Cabinet ministers Bill Young and Derek Quigley visited the area, but Prime Minister Robert Muldoon refused to call a state of civil emergency or allow the Earthquake and War Damage Commission to pay full compensation on damaged or destroyed houses.

By mid-July, the land was moving at close to 25 millimetres (1 in) per day. The chance of a major slip was discussed, but it was felt that there would be considerable warning before this happened, and as such residents were not officially evacuated (although several left their homes of their own volition). Heavy rain during late July led to an increase in the rate of slippage, and non-residents were barred from visiting the area. By early August the rate of slippage had increased to over 1 metre (3.3 ft) per day. More houses were evacuated during this time. At the instigation of Green Island mayor Vic Crimp, a state of civil emergency was finally declared starting at 8 am on 6 August and the area was partially evacuated. Plans were drawn up on 7 August for the complete evacuation of the area, though this had not been completed by the time the slip occurred.

== Landslip ==
At around 9.07 pm on 8 August, Abbotsford hill gave way. In all, some 18 hectares (44 acres) of land – nearly half of it residential – moved a distance of 48 metres (157 ft) down the hill in a mere 15 minutes. This land included most of the eastern side of Christie Street, most parts of Mitchell and Edward Streets east of Christie Street, the short Gordon Street, and the cul-de-sac, Charles Street. A large area of open land belonging to the Orchard Sun Club was also part of the slip. Sixty-nine houses were destroyed, either directly in the slip or later for safety reasons. At the foot of the hill, much of Miller Park sports ground and neighbouring Armstrong Lane were inundated.

The slip involved some 5 million cubic metres (180 million cubic feet) of sand and colluvium up to 40 metres (130 ft) in thickness. A 150-metre (490 ft) wide rift up to 16 metres (52 ft) in depth was left at the head of the slip.

Hundreds of people were left homeless, though – largely through good luck – there were no deaths and the worst injuries were very minor. Some residents only had seconds to leave their homes, and a group of seventeen residents had to be rescued from a small moving island of solid land.

== Aftermath ==
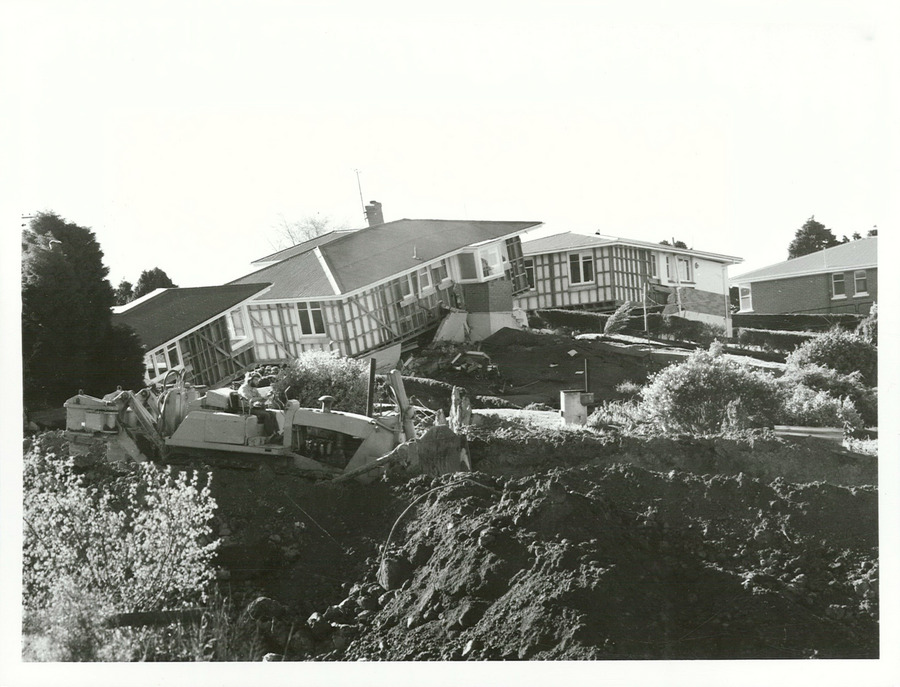
Bulldozers flattening land in front of a subsided house

The state of civil emergency continued until 18 August. Total damage was estimated at $NZ 10–13 million. Some houses survived the slide relatively intact and were moved to new locations. A Commission of Inquiry into the reasons for the slip sat for 58 days and produced its report in November 1980. The Commission concluded that the area had a geological predisposition to slippage, with potentially unstable weak clay layers, rich in montmorillonite clay. The situation was aggravated by the removal of sand from the toe of the hill at a quarry (Harrison's Pit) and during construction of both the residential area and motorway. Though not directly referred to in the Commission's findings, it is possible that a minor earthquake in the area in 1974 also contributed to the slide.

The landslip led to changes in building and subdivision practices in New Zealand, with geological assessment of the land now common prior to the approval of any land development. Land cover and landslip insurance regulations were also substantially rewritten in 1984 as a direct result of the Abbotsford landslip.

Much of the land which suffered slippage has since been landscaped into parkland, with stands of trees added to help stabilise the earth. The slip site now hosts rugby grounds and a paintball venue.
