= Walton Park Branch =

Branch railway line in New Zealand

Map

The Walton Park Branch was located in Otago, New Zealand and operated from 1874 until 1957, except for the first section, which survived until 1980. It was adjacent to the Fernhill Branch and was, in the words of David Leitch and Brian Scott, essentially "an industrial service siding rejoicing in the status of a branch line."

== Construction ==
The line was built to serve coal mines and ran east from the Main South Line, with the junction at Green Island. Construction commenced on 17 February 1874, and on 2 July 1874, it was open some 3.22 kilometres to Walton Park. Five years later, a brief extension of 0.77 km was opened to Saddle Hill on 24 September 1879. The only structure associated with the branch built along its entire length was a shelter shed at Walton Park.

== Operation ==
The Walton Park Branch's operations were of little significance. A review in 1895 said the line was in good order, and nothing of any note occurred until the section from Walton Park to Saddle Hill closed on 24 July 1944. This event in itself was so unremarkable that the railways annual report failed to mention it. After this stage, the branch was shunted only when required and did not even appear on the public timetable by 1950. Coal traffic ceased seven years later and official closure occurred on 1 May 1957, though the first 0.58 km to Geddes was retained and used as a spur until 1 January 1980, and had necessitated the construction of an expensive underpass tunnel when the long drawn out construction of the Dunedin Southern Motorway began in the 1970s.

== Today ==
Very little remains of the Walton Park Branch. In 2000 the Southern Motorway extension was built over the formation to Saddle Hill. Commercial and residential development has obliterated the rest of the old formation, though some is still visible from State Highway 1, a significant relic being the motorway underpass tunnel at Green Island. The rather unremarkable line is just as unremarkable in death as it was in life.
