= Fairfield, Otago =

Fairfield
- Suburb
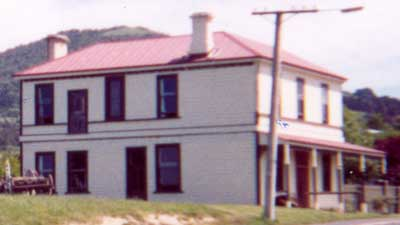
- Coach and Horses Hotel, Fairfield
- Interactive map of Fairfield
- Coordinates: 45°54′S 170°24′E
- Country: New Zealand
- City: Dunedin
- Local authority: Dunedin City Council
- Community board: Saddle Hill Community Board

Area
  - Land: 396 ha (980 acres)

Population (June 2025)
  - Total: 2,620
  - Density: 662/km^{2} (1,710/sq mi)

Mosgiel	Wingatui
East Taieri	Fairfield	Abbotsford
(Saddle Hill)	Waldronville	Green Island

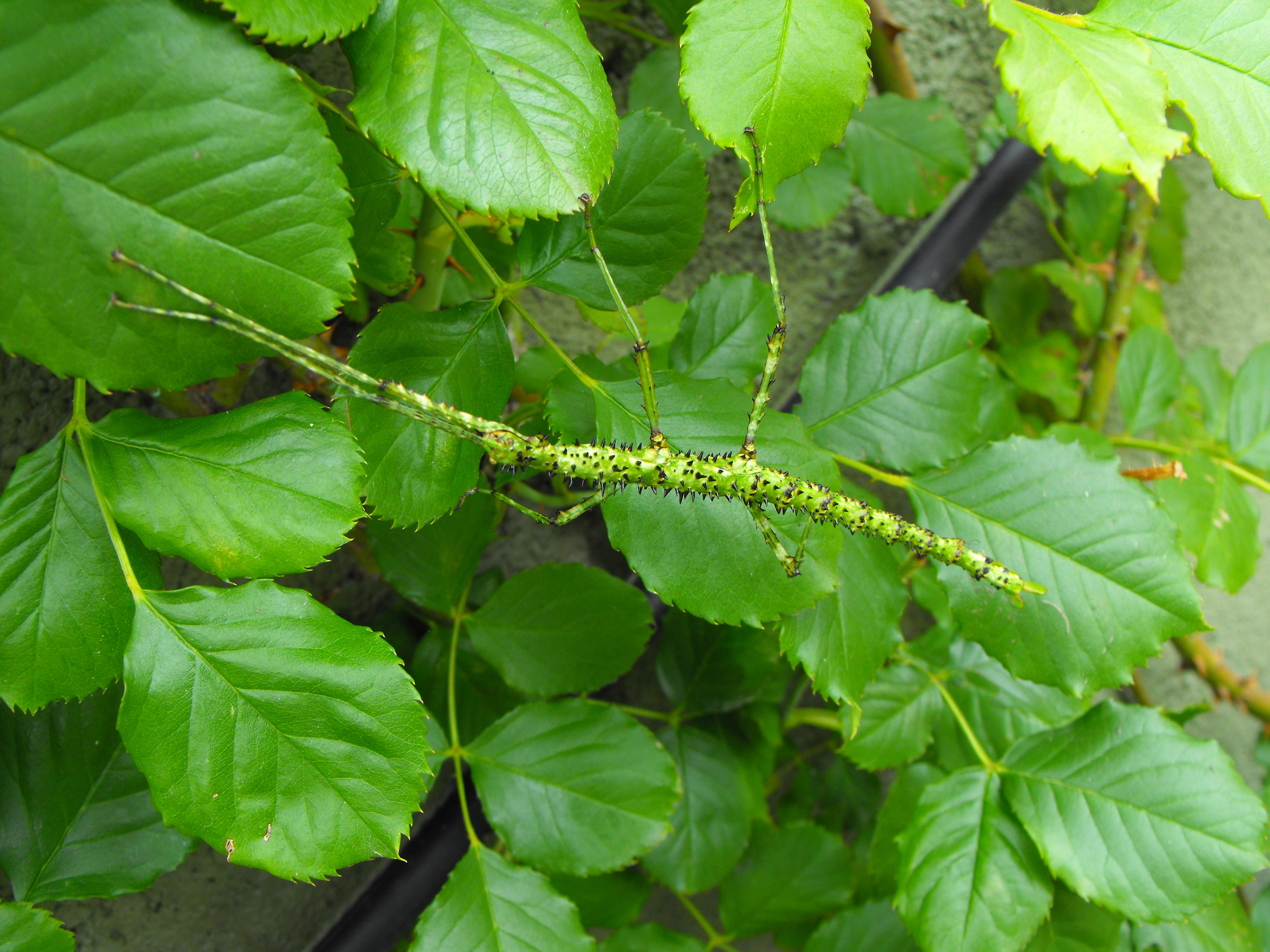
The rare Acanthoxyla prasina, or prickly stick insect, is resident in Fairfield.

Fairfield is a suburb of Dunedin, New Zealand.

Fairfield lies in rolling hill country, close to the slopes of Saddle Hill and Scroggs Hill. The name Fairfield was originally given as a descriptive name by early European settler William Martin to his farm property, located close to where the town now stands.

Under the 1989 local government reforms, the city of Dunedin and its surrounding region was grouped into a territorial authority called Dunedin City. Under this system, Fairfield is officially an outer suburb within this territorial authority.

Until 2000, Fairfield was located on State Highway 1, but is now on a bypass of the Dunedin Southern Motorway. Fairfield is situated about 11 km (7 mi) west-southwest of the Octagon, Dunedin's city centre.

As of the 2013 New Zealand census (delayed from 2011 due to the 2011 Christchurch earthquake), Fairfield had a population of 2,379 – an increase of 5.0% from the population of 2,275 in the 2006 census. Fairfield accounts for 2.0% of the total Dunedin City territorial authority population.

The local primary school is Fairfield School.

== Demographics ==
Fairfield covers 3.96 km^{2} (1.53 sq mi) and had an estimated population of 2,620 as of June 2025, with a population density of 662 people per km^{2}.

Historical population
Year	Pop.	±% p.a.
2006	2,268	—
2013	2,415	+0.90%
2018	2,511	+0.78%

Fairfield had a population of 2,511 at the 2018 New Zealand census, an increase of 96 people (4.0%) since the 2013 census, and an increase of 243 people (10.7%) since the 2006 census. There were 933 households, comprising 1,263 males and 1,248 females, giving a sex ratio of 1.01 males per female. The median age was 44.3 years (compared with 37.4 years nationally), with 462 people (18.4%) aged under 15 years, 402 (16.0%) aged 15 to 29, 1,227 (48.9%) aged 30 to 64, and 423 (16.8%) aged 65 or older.

Ethnicities were 93.0% European/Pākehā, 6.8% Māori, 1.1% Pasifika, 4.1% Asian, and 1.7% other ethnicities. People may identify with more than one ethnicity.

The percentage of people born overseas was 11.7, compared with 27.1% nationally.

Although some people chose not to answer the census's question about religious affiliation, 56.3% had no religion, 36.0% were Christian, 0.1% had Māori religious beliefs, 0.4% were Hindu, 0.2% were Muslim, 0.1% were Buddhist and 1.2% had other religions.

Of those at least 15 years old, 378 (18.4%) people had a bachelor's or higher degree, and 339 (16.5%) people had no formal qualifications. The median income was $38,700, compared with $31,800 nationally. 426 people (20.8%) earned over $70,000 compared to 17.2% nationally. The employment status of those at least 15 was that 1,104 (53.9%) people were employed full-time, 360 (17.6%) were part-time, and 42 (2.0%) were unemployed.

== Education ==
Fairfield School is a full primary serving years 1 to 8 with a roll of 497 students. It was established in 1872 as Waldron School. A fire destroyed the school in 1951, and it was rebuilt on the current site in 1963.

Te Kura Kaupapa Māori o Ōtepoti is a composite school serving years 1 to 13 with a roll of 89 students. The school was founded in 1994, and teaches entirely in the Māori language.

Both schools are coeducational. Rolls are as of July 2026.

== Walton Park ==
The suburb of Walton Park, which developed from a 2000s subdivision, is located to the south of Fairfield, on the opposite side of the Dunedin Southern Motorway (part of SH 1). It sits on a rise on a minor road leading towards Waldronville and Brighton.

Waldronville and the nearby Kaikorai Lagoon can be seen from the park which gives the suburb its name, a sports ground surrounded by reclaimed bush, through which there are several recreational walks. The southern edge of the park is bounded by Christies Creek, which flows into the Kaikorai Lagoon.

The area around Walton Park was previously the 360-acre property of solicitor James Howorth, who lived on the site in the late 19th century. Part of the area was mined for coal and clay, both used by a nearby brickworks. The coal mine was served by a spur of the South Island Main Trunk rail line, the Walton Park Branch.
