= Dunedin Southern Motorway =

Road in New Zealand

Dunedin Southern Motorway
- State Highway 1

Route information
- Maintained by NZ Transport Agency Waka Kotahi
- Length: 13 km (8.1 mi)
- Existed: 1972–present

Major junctions
- Northeast end: Lookout Point, Dunedin
- SH 87 at Mosgiel
- Southwest end: Mosgiel

Location
- Country: New Zealand
- Primary destinations: Dunedin, Green Island, Fairfield, Mosgiel

Highway system
- New Zealand state highways; Motorways and expressways; List

The Dunedin Southern Motorway is the main arterial route south from the South Island city of Dunedin, part of New Zealand's State Highway 1. Despite its name, only a portion of the route is officially classified as motorway. The route is the southernmost section of median-divided highway in the world.

== Route ==
SH 1 traverses central Dunedin as two multi-lane one-way streets, travelling past the University of Otago and the CBD before the separate streets rejoin as a single multi-lane road at the Andersons Bay Road intersection in South Dunedin; the intersection is a busy signal-controlled "T" junction between SH 1 and Andersons Bay Road.

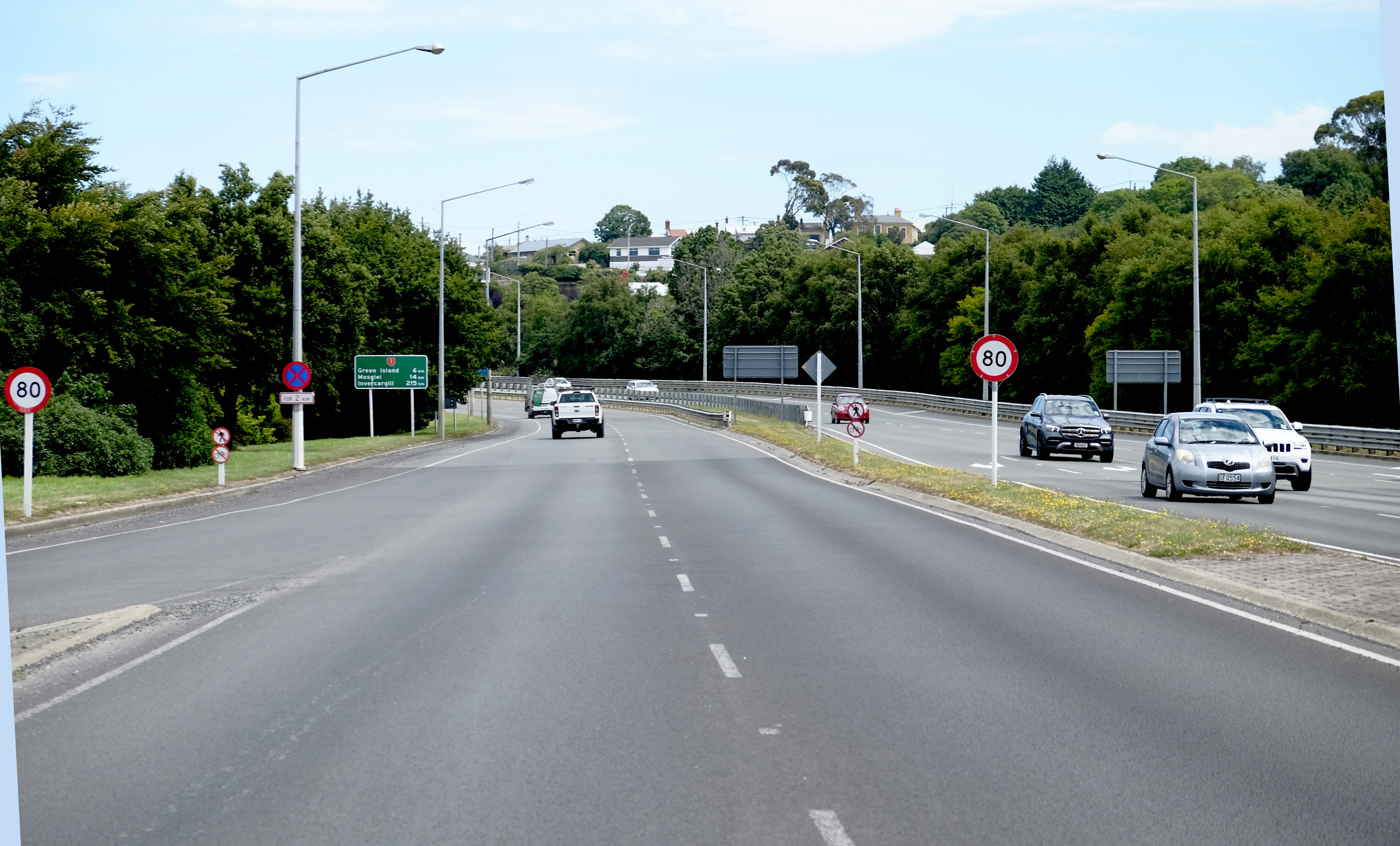
Start of divided carriageway at Anderson's Bay Road

From the Andersons Bay Road intersection, SH 1 becomes a four lane limited-access median-divided road with an 80 km/h speed limit until the Barnes Drive intersection. Known as the Caversham Bypass, SH 1 crosses King Edward Street (South Dunedin's main street) in Kensington and South Road near the Glen by way of twin overbridges. While this section meets most technical definitions of a motorway with full access restrictions, including no pedestrian or cycle traffic, it is not designated a motorway by the NZ Transport Agency due to its short length. The Main South Line parallels SH 1 along the southeast side of the road.

At the base of Calton Hill, SH 1 intersects with Barnes Drive at a signal-controlled intersection. Here limited-access restrictions end briefly and the speed limit drops to 60 km/h. SH 1 ascends Calton Hill to Lookout Point as a median divided arterial named Caversham Valley Road. There are several streets that intersect with SH 1, albeit with left in/left out only turning restrictions. A service lane offers access to residential properties on the southbound side of the road and links to South Road.

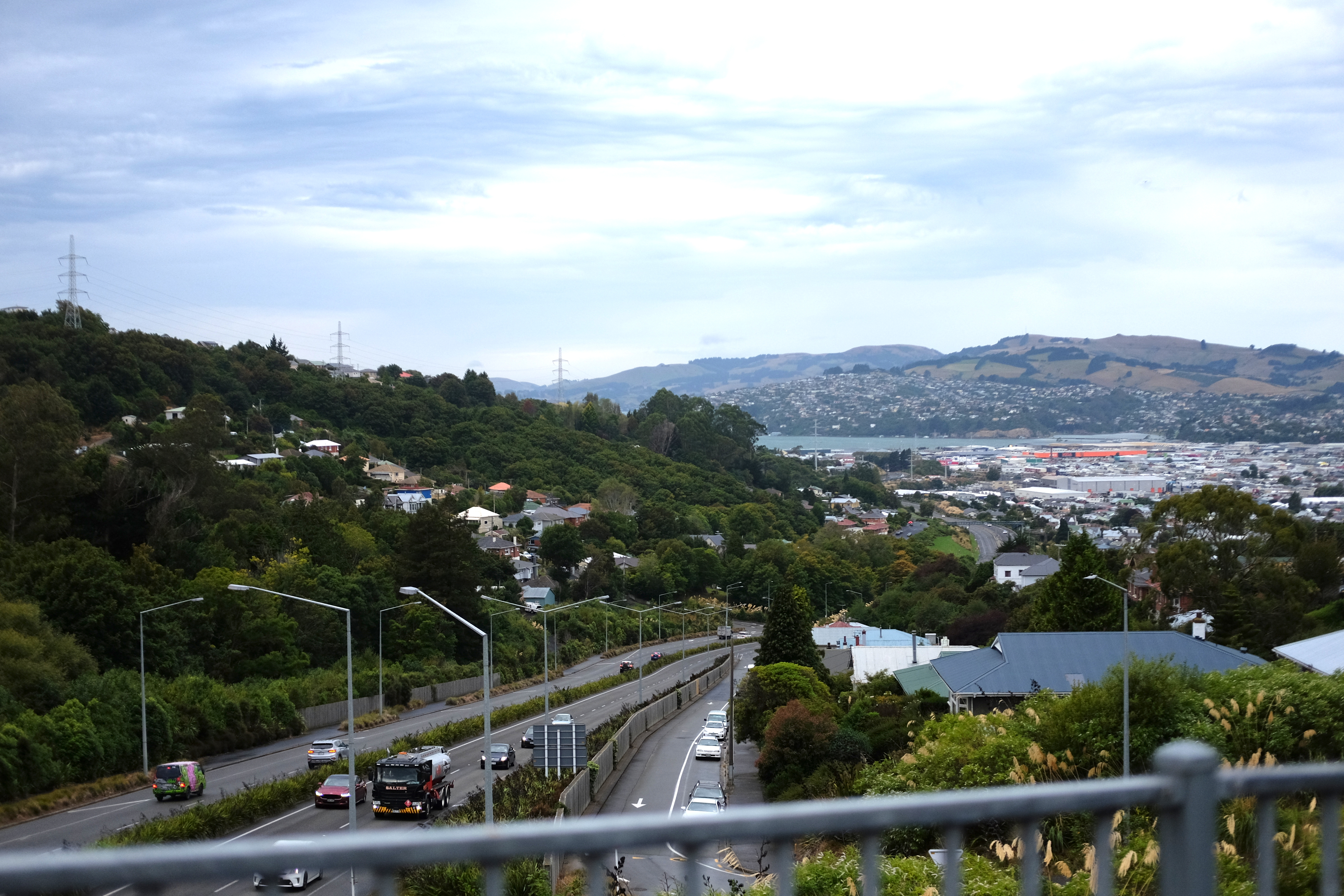
Ascent to Lookout Point before becoming a motorway

Near the crest of Lookout Point, an overbridge crosses the highway, linking Mornington Road and Riselaw Road. The overbridge, along with left in/left out intersections on both sides of the highway, provides a small grade-separated interchange. As the highway begins to descend the hill, the motorway designation begins, with a concrete median barrier, resumption of limited access restrictions and a speed limit increase to 100 km/h.

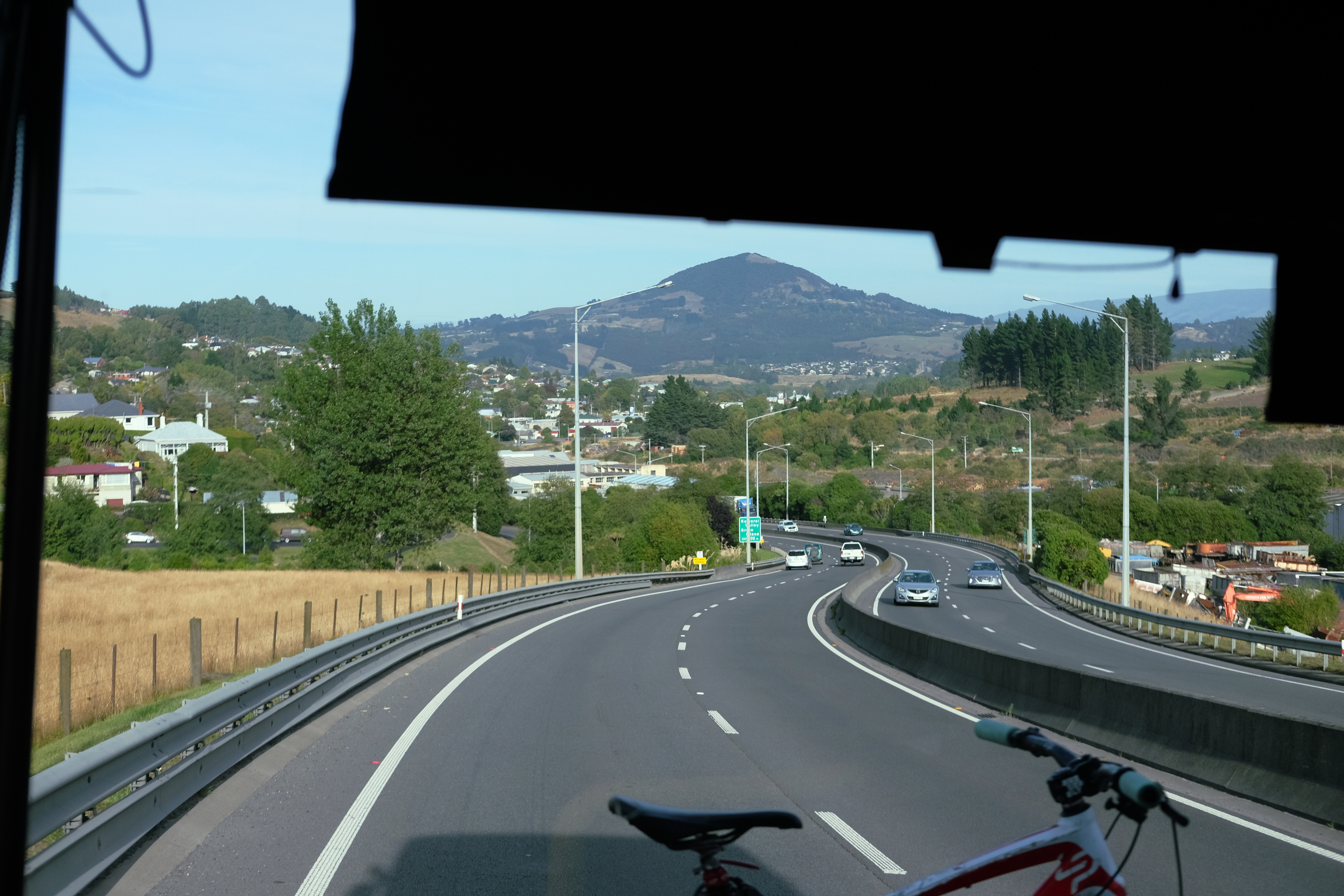
Beginning of the motorway on the descent

The motorway winds relatively steeply down past the site of New Zealand Refrigerating Company's former Burnside Freezing Works, and crosses the Main South Road/Kaikorai Valley Road interchange via an overbridge.

Map of the Caversham Bypass Motorway

Once on the flat of the Kaikorai Valley the motorway passes underneath the northbound on-ramp from Green Island before passing between the suburbs of Green Island and Abbotsford to the Green Island/Sunnyvale full diamond interchange.

Beyond this interchange the motorway crosses the Kaikorai Estuary and by-passes the suburb of Fairfield. There is a half diamond interchange at Old Brighton Road (northbound on, southbound off) before the motorway climbs towards its highest point, crossing a ridge of Saddle Hill. A new overbridge was constructed to take Old Brighton Rd over the new motorway. This was named after W.G (Bill) Auld MBE, a local resident who was a staunch advocate for the motorway bypassing Fairfield. He died shortly before the completion of the motorway but on the day of his funeral his hearse took him down the route he fought hard to implement.

There is another half-diamond interchange (northbound off, southbound on) and a separate overbridge for Morris Road. The motorway then descends from the slopes of Saddle Hill onto the floodplain of the Taieri River at Mosgiel. There is a full diamond interchange with SH 87, the primary access to Mosgiel from SH 1. At this point the motorway narrows from four lanes to two. The motorway designation continues for a further 600 metres before SH 1 continues as an ordinary single carriageway through the suburb of East Taieri.

== History ==
A motorway extending south from the Andersons Bay intersection was first proposed from the late 1950s, when Dunedin, like other major centres in New Zealand, was experiencing rapid vehicle growth and a decline in public transport usage.

A report from De Leuw Cather was commissioned by the Dunedin City Council in 1963, which recommended a number of changes primarily to Dunedin's arterial road system. A number of roads around the city were widened to four lanes, and the report recommended that investigation, design, and construction begin of the proposed southern motorway.

During this time period the then Ministry of Works designated a substantial amount of land for future upgrade works along SH 1, with a view that by the late 1990s much of it would be rebuilt as motorway, possibly along the lines of a US Interstate, with bypasses of all small towns, grade separation of all intersections, and no private property accesses. Within the Dunedin area, Council planning maps from the 1960s and 1970s show a designation for a "Dunedin to Milton Motorway" which is part of these Ministry of Works designations.

The present constructed motorway generally follows along the route of this early designation. Further evidence of the Ministry of Works intentions can be seen on the "flood-free" section of SH 1 near Henley on the Taieri Plains, 35 km south of Dunedin, where the two-lane road has a 2.5-metre shoulder on the northbound side and a standard 0.5-metre shoulder on the southbound. This two-lane road was constructed in the early 1970s as the northbound lanes of a motorway, with the intention that separate southbound lanes would be constructed in the future.

=== Section-by-section construction ===
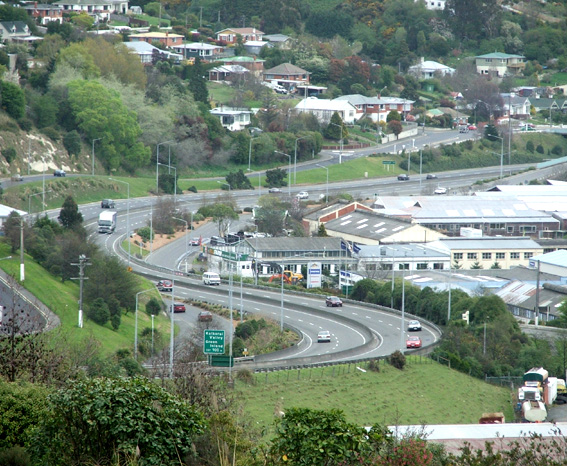
The Dunedin Southern Motorway snakes its way south past Burnside and Green Island

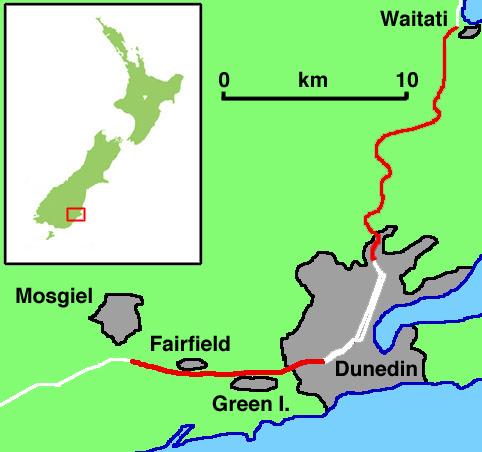
Dunedin Northern and Southern Motorways (marked in red - other parts of State Highway 1 are marked in white)

The motorway was constructed in a number of sections.

The first section was completed in 1972 and bypassed the suburb of Green Island. This section began at the southern end of Kaikorai Valley Road at Burnside, and travelled south for 2.5 kilometres, dividing Green Island from Abbotsford. It ended at the southern end of Green Island, and connected with the main south road through Fairfield. Construction of this section of motorway is considered by some people to have been a causal factor of the Abbotsford landslip in 1979. Around the same time, construction began on the section traversing Saddle Hill, from Mosgiel to Fairfield. Earthworks were undertaken to allow for the construction of a four-lane motorway with northbound and southbound slip lanes extending from a future interchange with SH 87 at Mosgiel. At the time the road was constructed with two lanes and a northbound passing lane northward from the SH 1/SH 87 intersection.

The second section was a short 700-metre section of four-lane dual carriageway completed in 1978. It extended southwards from the Andersons Bay intersection, across King Edward Street on twin bridges to connect with South Road near the Glen.

The 1980s saw the extension of the motorway south from the Glen to Barnes Drive, bypassing Caversham. Due to funding constraints this section was only built as a single two-lane carriageway, albeit with no intersections.

In 1987, due to high accident and congestion problems, the at-grade intersection with SH 87 at Mosgiel was upgraded into a full diamond interchange. Under severe funding constraints the SH 87 bridge was built to accommodate only two lanes of SH 1 travelling underneath, which will make widening of SH 1 at this point more costly.

In 1989-1990 the Green Island motorway was extended northwards up Calton Hill past the Burnside Freezing Works to re-connect with SH 1 at Lookout Point.

A major extension was completed in 2003 when the 4.5-km Fairfield Bypass was opened. This connected the southern terminus of the Green Island Motorway with the northern end of the Saddle Hill section of SH 1. There were several delays in construction of this stretch due to the presence of mine workings that created major difficulties in the stabilisation of the land along the route. The Saddle Hill section was upgraded at this time to a four-lane divided motorway to take advantage of the preparatory earthworks completed in the 1960s. The completion of the Fairfield section meant that SH 1 was now an uninterrupted four-lane divided motorway from Lookout Point to the SH 87 interchange.

From 2010 - 2015, NZTA undertook a safety improvement project on the Caversham section of the highway, the project was delivered in two stages. Stage 1 of the project upgraded the Caversham Bypass from the Glen to Barnes Drive to a four lane median divided highway, this involved a duplication of the South Road overbridge. Stage 2 upgraded the Caversham Valley Road section from Barnes Drive to Lookout Point. Caversham Valley Road was widened, adding shoulders, a kerbed median, the southbound service lane and the Riselaw Road overbridge.

== Future works ==
=== East Taieri Bypass ===
Map of the proposed East Taieri Bypass

Land was designated in the early 1960s by the then Ministry of Works for a motorway corridor from the SH 1/SH 87 interchange southwards through East Taieri towards Allanton. This would have re-aligned SH 1 along this route and have extended the motorway southwards for several kilometres beyond its present terminus. A stretch of SH 1 was realigned in this area during the 1970s, moved westward to avoid the edge of the coastal range of hills, and the junction with SH 86 at Allanton was redesigned, but no further work towards a potential motorway extension was carried out. Transit New Zealand did not seek to renew the designation for this road in 2007, meaning that this project is now unlikely to proceed. As of 2023, houses have been built on parts of the former designation and a 380-unit retirement village is under construction, presumably therefore, any future bypass of East Taieri will require a different alignment.

== Junction list ==
| Territorial authority | Location | km | Destination | Notes |
|---|---|---|---|---|
| Dunedin City | Kensington | | SH 1 northbound (Andersons Bay Road) – City Centre, Timaru; SH 1 southbound (Cumberland Street); Andersons Bay Road – South Dunedin, Andersons Bay, Otago Peninsula | Traffic light controlled intersection Dunedin Southern Motorway begins |
| Dunedin City | Caversham | | Southern Scenic Route (Barnes Drive); Caversham, South Dunedin, Carisbrook | Traffic light controlled intersection |
| Dunedin City | Caversham | | Burnett Street | Southbound exit and entrance |
| Dunedin City | Caversham | | Aberfeldy Street | Northbound exit and entrance |
| Dunedin City | Lookout Point | | South Road – Corstorphine | Southbound exit and entrance |
| Dunedin City | Lookout Point | | Riselaw Road – Mornington | Southbound exit and entrance |
| Dunedin City | Lookout Point | | Mornington Road – Mornington | Northbound exit and entrance |
| Dunedin City | Lookout Point | | Main South Road – Concord, Burnside | Southbound exit and northbound entrance Motorway designation begins |
| Dunedin City | Lookout Point | | Short Street | Northbound entrance |
| Dunedin City | Burnside | | Main South Road – Kaikorai Valley, Concord, Green Island | Northbound exit and southbound entrance |
| Dunedin City | Green Island | | Main South Road – Green Island, Abbotsford | Southbound exit only |
| Dunedin City | Sunnyvale | | Main South Road – Abbotsford, Brighton, Green Island | |
| Dunedin City | Fairfield | | Old Brighton Road – Fairfield, Saddle Hill | Southbound exit and northbound entrance |
| Dunedin City | Fairfield | | Saddle Hill Road – Fairfield, Saddle Hill | Northbound exit and southbound entrance |
| Dunedin City | Kinmont Park | | SH 87 (Quarry Road) – Mosgiel | |
| Dunedin City | Kinmont Park | | Braeside; SH 1 south – Airport, Invercargill | Dunedin Southern Motorway and motorway designation end |

== See also ==
- List of motorways in New Zealand
