= Fairfield School, Dunedin =

Fairfield School

Location
- 10 Sickels St, Fairfield, Dunedin; 45.900647°S 170.391515°E

Information
- Type: Primary and Intermediate (Year 0-8)
- Motto: Independence through Responsibility
- Established: 1872
- Ministry of Education Institution no.: 3736
- Principal: Greg Lees
- Enrolment: 497 (July 2026)
- Socio-economic decile: 10
- Website: fairfield.school.nz

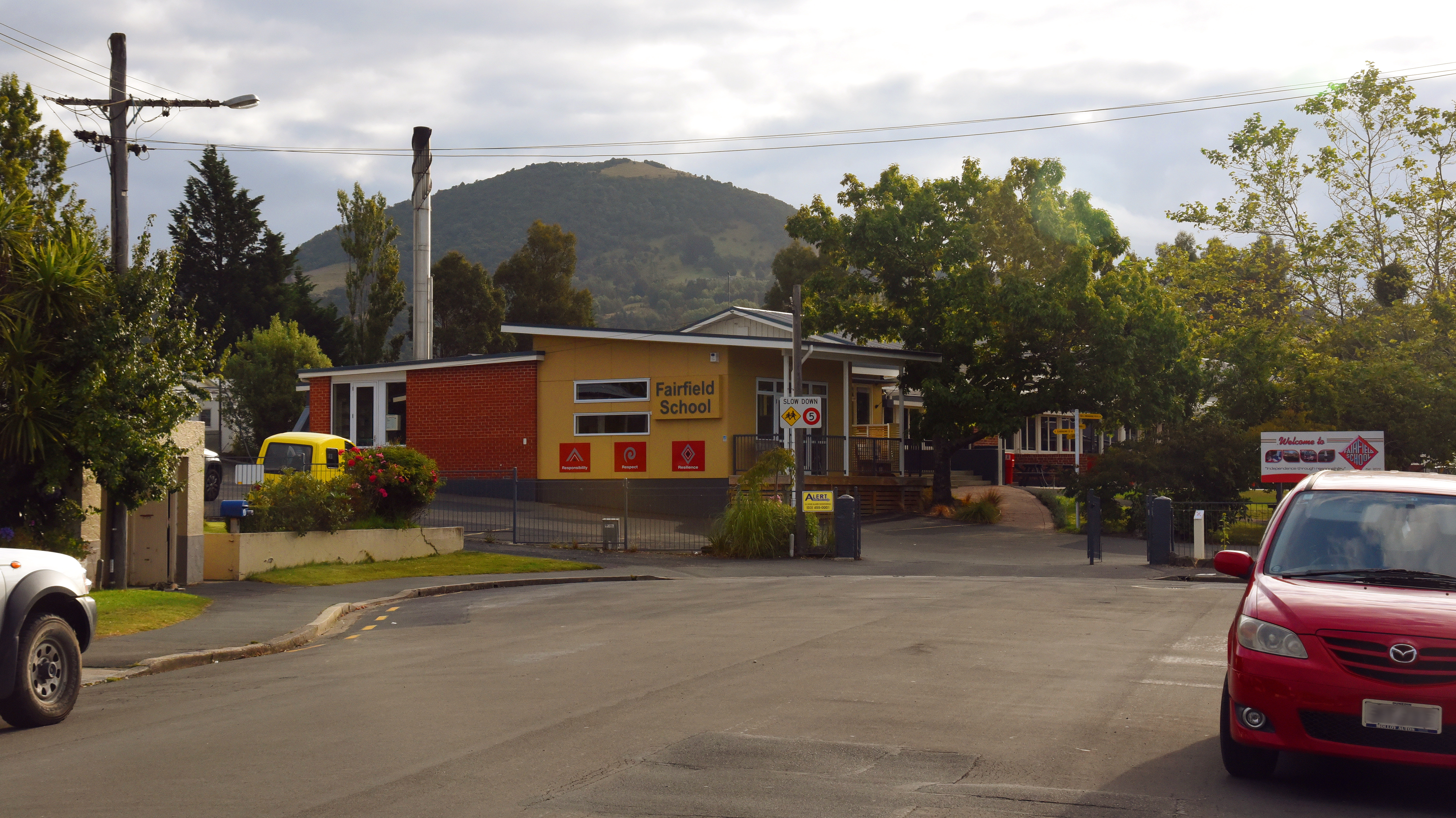
Photograph of Fairfield School entrance from Sickels Street.

Fairfield School is a Primary and Intermediate school in Dunedin, New Zealand.

The school was established during the late 19th century in the suburb of Fairfield by William Martin. It is situated on Sickels Street near the Dunedin Southern Motorway.

The school has restricted enrolment to a limited geographical zone to reduce class sizes.
