= Waldronville =

- Suburb
- Interactive map of Waldronville
- Coordinates: 45°55′25″S 170°24′15″E
- Country: New Zealand
- City: Dunedin
- Local authority: Dunedin City Council
- Community board: Saddle Hill Community Board

Area
  - Land: 52 ha (130 acres)

Population (2018 Census)
  - Total: 909
  - Density: 1,700/km^{2} (4,500/sq mi)

	Fairfield	Green Island
	Waldronville	St Clair
Brighton	(South Pacific Ocean)

Waldronville is a coastal settlement on the Pacific Ocean coast of the South Island of New Zealand. Established in the 1950s as a commuter settlement, it is located 13 kilometres (8.1 mi) to the southwest of Dunedin city centre, and lies within the city's limits. Waldronville was developed by Bill Waldron (1909-1976), when he purchased the McCraws farm in the early 1950s, initially for 200 houses. In the mid-1970s, two other streets were added to the southwest of the settlement. In the mid-1990s, Friendship Drive and Wavy Knowes developments were added to the northeast.

The township of Brighton lies 7 kilometres (4.3 mi) to the southwest of Waldronville; the tiny settlement of Westwood lies halfway between Brighton and Waldronville.

Waldronville is located close to the Kaikorai Lagoon, an expanse of water at the mouth of the Kaikorai Stream protected from the ocean by a sandbar which stretches inland almost as far as the Dunedin suburb of Green Island, 3 kilometres (1.9 mi) to the north. The lagoon is part of a research project aimed at establishing a national estuarine monitoring protocol. The actual island which shares the suburb's name lies 2 kilometres (1.2 mi) offshore to the south of Waldronville. The Island Park Recreation Reserve is a protected area between the village and coast.

The rocky outcrop of Blackhead is located to the east of Waldronville. A major quarry is located at Blackhead, mining basalt for road metal. There are hexagonal basalt columns at Blackhead, similar to those further to the east at Second Beach.

Many of Waldronville's streets are named after World War II-era aircraft. The settlement is connected to Brighton and Taieri Mouth to the southwest via a coastal road; in the other direction the road stretches to Green Island. A narrow rural road runs past the quarry and on past Tunnel Beach, connecting with Dunedin's main suburban street system at Corstorphine.

Green Park Cemetery, one of Dunedin's main cemeteries, is located close to Waldronville (at 45°55′40″S 170°23′10″E).

Dunedin's only permanent motor racing circuit, Beachlands Speedway, is located close to the southern end of Waldronville.

== Demographics ==
Historical population of the settlement
Year	Pop.	±% p.a.
2006	699	—
2013	783	+1.63%
2018	909	+3.03%

Waldronville settlement covers 0.52 km^{2} (0.20 sq mi), and is part of the larger Waldronville statistical area.

The settlement had a population of 909 at the 2018 New Zealand census, an increase of 126 people (16.1%) since the 2013 census, and an increase of 210 people (30.0%) since the 2006 census. There were 318 households, comprising 462 males and 438 females, giving a sex ratio of 1.05 males per female, with 198 people (21.8%) aged under 15 years, 150 (16.5%) aged 15 to 29, 465 (51.2%) aged 30 to 64, and 93 (10.2%) aged 65 or older.

Ethnicities were 94.4% European/Pākehā, 8.3% Māori, 0.3% Pasifika, 4.0% Asian, and 1.3% other ethnicities. People may identify with more than one ethnicity.

Although some people chose not to answer the census's question about religious affiliation, 59.4% had no religion, 29.7% were Christian, 0.3% were Muslim, 0.3% were Buddhist and 2.3% had other religions.

Of those at least 15 years old, 123 (17.3%) people had a bachelor's or higher degree, and 147 (20.7%) people had no formal qualifications. 141 people (19.8%) earned over $70,000 compared to 17.2% nationally. The employment status of those at least 15 was that 408 (57.4%) people were employed full-time, 117 (16.5%) were part-time, and 15 (2.1%) were unemployed.

=== Waldronville statistical area ===
Waldronville statistical area covers 9.54 km^{2} (3.68 sq mi) and had an estimated population of 1,370 as of June 2025, with a population density of 144 people per km^{2}.

Historical population of the statistical area
Year	Pop.	±% p.a.
2006	861	—
2013	1,128	+3.93%
2018	1,299	+2.86%

Waldronville had a population of 1,299 at the 2018 New Zealand census, an increase of 171 people (15.2%) since the 2013 census, and an increase of 438 people (50.9%) since the 2006 census. There were 441 households, comprising 666 males and 636 females, giving a sex ratio of 1.05 males per female. The median age was 38.0 years (compared with 37.4 years nationally), with 297 people (22.9%) aged under 15 years, 204 (15.7%) aged 15 to 29, 675 (52.0%) aged 30 to 64, and 123 (9.5%) aged 65 or older.

Ethnicities were 93.1% European/Pākehā, 7.9% Māori, 0.7% Pasifika, 5.1% Asian, and 1.6% other ethnicities. People may identify with more than one ethnicity.

The percentage of people born overseas was 13.9, compared with 27.1% nationally.

Although some people chose not to answer the census's question about religious affiliation, 60.7% had no religion, 29.3% were Christian, 0.7% were Muslim, 0.5% were Buddhist and 1.4% had other religions.

Of those at least 15 years old, 210 (21.0%) people had a bachelor's or higher degree, and 180 (18.0%) people had no formal qualifications. The median income was $40,300, compared with $31,800 nationally. 225 people (22.5%) earned over $70,000 compared to 17.2% nationally. The employment status of those at least 15 was that 588 (58.7%) people were employed full-time, 171 (17.1%) were part-time, and 21 (2.1%) were unemployed.

== Education ==
Waldronville School was a state full primary school serving years 1 to 8, which closed in 2010 due to a declining roll. The site was cleared in 2013 to allow the creation of a residential subdivision.
