= Island Park Recreation Reserve =

Coordinates: 45°55′41″S 170°24′20″E

Island Park Recreation Reserve is a coastal reserve in Waldronville, just to the southwest of Dunedin, New Zealand. The Kaikorai Stream and Westwood Recreation Reserve lie to the west. The reserve was established in 1977, coming into effect in 1978.
