= 1974 Dunedin earthquake =

Earthquake in New Zealand

- Location within New Zealand
- UTC time: 1974-04-09 07:49:46
- Local date: 9 April 1974
- Local time: 7:49 pm
- Magnitude: 4.9 M or 5.0 M
- Epicentre: 45.97°S 170.52°E

A magnitude 4.9 or 5.0 earthquake occurred near the New Zealand city of Dunedin on 9 April 1974. With Dunedin being in an area of New Zealand that rarely experiences earthquakes, this was the largest in the city since its founding in the 1840s, and the first to cause damage. Over 3,000 damage claims were lodged with the Earthquake and War Damage Commission, collectively valued at about $250,000 (equivalent to $3,600,000 in 2026). Most damage was to house chimneys.

== Tectonic setting ==
Eastern Otago has been described as a "more tectonically stable" area of New Zealand, meaning significant earthquakes rarely occur in the area. Most earthquakes felt in eastern Otago originate from Fiordland, which is "highly active", and is about 200–300 kilometres to the west. In the 70 years leading up to 1974, Dunedin experienced at least four earthquakes measuring at least V (moderate) on the modified Mercalli intensity scale.

== Earthquake ==
The earthquake struck Dunedin at approximately 7:49 pm on 9 April 1974. Its epicentre was located offshore, about 5 kilometres south of the suburb of St Clair, and at a depth of 12 to 20 kilometres. It either had a magnitude of 4.9 or 5.0 and a modified Mercalli intensity of VIII (severe) or VII (very strong) at a maximum. A peak ground acceleration of 0.27g (0.27 times the acceleration of Earth's gravity) was measured in St Clair. The earthquake was described as being "sharp" and having a "strong vertical motion". Seismologists are uncertain on which fault the earthquake was located, but it is believed to have been on the Green Island Fault, as it is the closest to the epicentre. There were aftershocks at 8:20 pm and 9:50 pm, which both had a magnitude of 3.7.

The earthquake caused power outages, chimneys to fall and the telephone system to be overloaded. It was reported to have broken windows and caused cracks to appear in "a number" of buildings. It took about 45 minutes for power to be restored to Corstorphine. False alarms from automatic warning systems caused all of Dunedin's available fire appliances to be dispatched.

The Earthquake and War Damage Commission received about 3,000 damage claims (totalling about $250,000, equivalent to $3,600,000 in 2026), which D. G. Bishop of the New Zealand Geological Survey found "extraordinarily large for an earthquake of this magnitude". This was the highest since the 1968 Inangahua earthquake. Damage was mostly minor, mostly occurring on houses, with over half of claims involving chimney damage. Damage to chimneys was "consistent and widespread" in the "southern suburbs of the alluvium between Otago Peninsula and St Clair" according to Adams and Keans, and occurred throughout the rest of the city but in lower numbers. Many claims involved masonry damage, plumbing damage and interior plaster being cracked. Bricks fell out of Knox Church.

This was the first earthquake in Dunedin to cause widespread damage since its founding in the 1840s, and is the strongest earthquake to hit the city. The next largest earthquake in the area since then was a magnitude 4.7 earthquake in 2015. A commemorative event was held on the 50th anniversary of the earthquake, in 2024. It included a short film about the earthquake, made by a University of Otago student.
