= Abbotsford, New Zealand =

Suburb of Dunedin, New Zealand

Abbotsford
- Suburb
- Interactive map of Abbotsford
- Coordinates: 45.897°S 170.426°E
- Country: New Zealand
- City: Dunedin
- Local authority: Dunedin City Council

Area
  - Land: 236 ha (580 acres)

Population (June 2025)
  - Total: 2,980
  - Density: 1,260/km^{2} (3,270/sq mi)

| Fairfield | Abbotsford | Kaikorai Valley |
| | Green Island |

Abbotsford is a suburb of the New Zealand city of Dunedin. It is located to the west of the city centre.

It is Immediately to the north of Green Island, and separated from it by State Highway 1 and South Island Main Trunk Railway (opened to Green Island in 1874). Abbotsford is an entirely residential suburb with virtually no retail or service sector of its own – for these it relies on Green Island.

== The Abbotsford landslip ==
On the night of 8 August 1979, a major landslide occurred in Abbotsford, resulting in the destruction or relocation of some 69 houses, and requiring the evacuation of over 600 people. No-one was killed. This remains the largest landslip to have occurred in an urban area of New Zealand.

== Sunnyvale ==
In the southwest corner of Abbotsford, abutting the northwest corner of Green Island, is the Sunnyvale neighbourhood. Until the early 2000s, the main road route south out of Dunedin passed through Sunnyvale, but it and Fairfield, 2 km to the west, were bypassed by a motorway extension in 2002. The sports arena of Sunnyvale Park, serving Abbotsford and Green Island, is located in the suburb.

== Demographics ==
Abbotsford covers 2.36 km^{2} (0.91 sq mi) and had an estimated population of 2,980 as of June 2025, with a population density of 1,263 people per km^{2}.

Historical population
| Year | Pop. | ±% p.a. |
|---|---|---|
| 2006 | 2,400 | — |
| 2013 | 2,496 | +0.56% |
| 2018 | 2,817 | +2.45% |

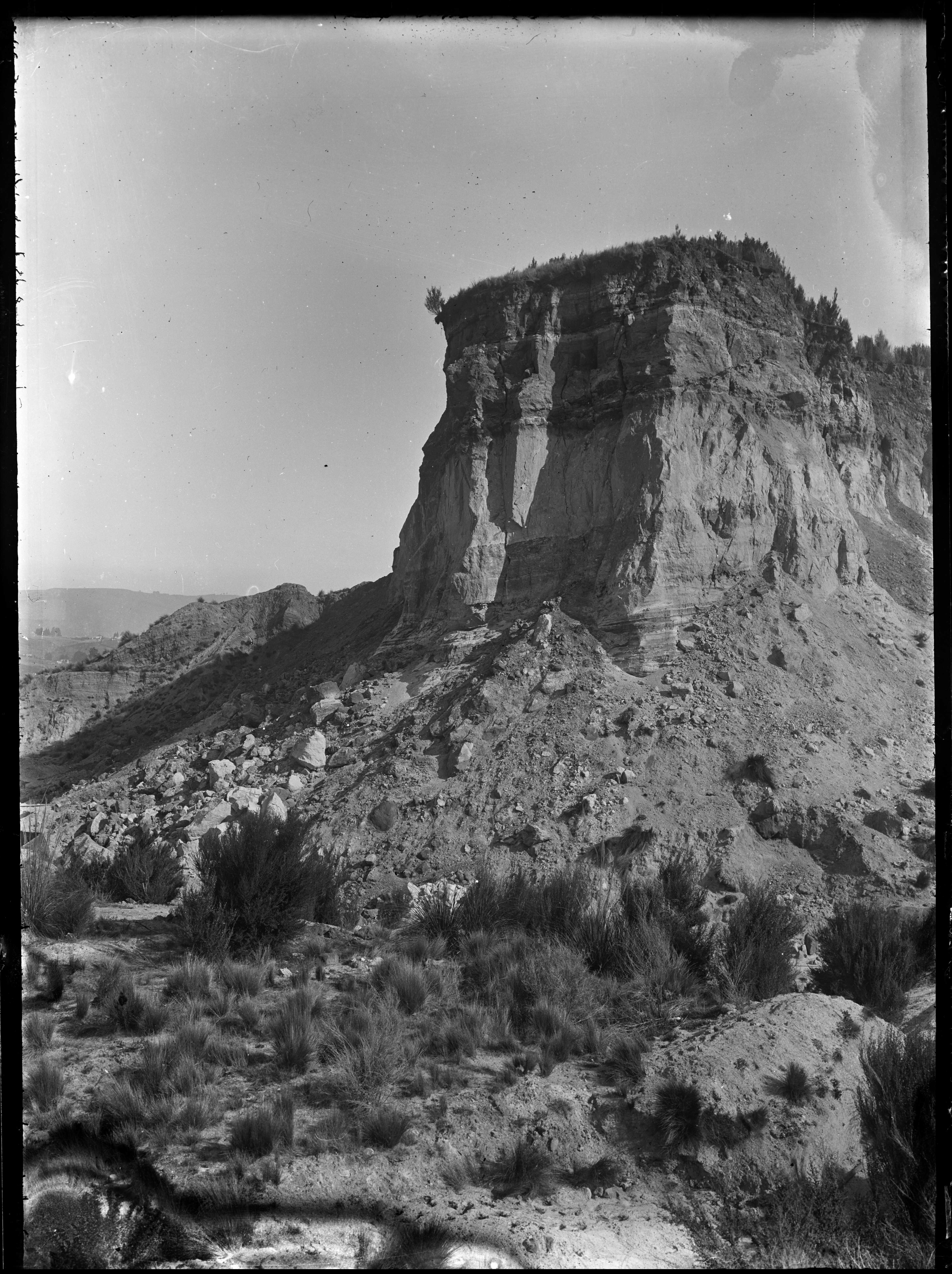
View of a rocky outcrop with slipping rock below, and tussock grass in the foreground. Described in the photographer's album as "Sand pit. Abbotsford". Photograph taken by Albert Percy Godber in October 1925.

Abbotsford had a population of 2,817 at the 2018 New Zealand census, an increase of 321 people (12.9%) since the 2013 census, and an increase of 417 people (17.4%) since the 2006 census. There were 1,092 households, comprising 1,401 males and 1,413 females, giving a sex ratio of 0.99 males per female. The median age was 38.8 years (compared with 37.4 years nationally), with 549 people (19.5%) aged under 15 years, 528 (18.7%) aged 15 to 29, 1,338 (47.5%) aged 30 to 64, and 405 (14.4%) aged 65 or older.

Ethnicities were 93.9% European/Pākehā, 9.1% Māori, 1.6% Pasifika, 2.8% Asian, and 1.3% other ethnicities. People may identify with more than one ethnicity.

The percentage of people born overseas was 7.8, compared with 27.1% nationally.

Although some people chose not to answer the census's question about religious affiliation, 65.0% had no religion, 26.2% were Christian, 0.1% had Māori religious beliefs, 0.2% were Hindu, 0.2% were Muslim, 0.1% were Buddhist and 1.4% had other religions.

Of those at least 15 years old, 276 (12.2%) people had a bachelor's or higher degree, and 525 (23.1%) people had no formal qualifications. The median income was $36,200, compared with $31,800 nationally. 327 people (14.4%) earned over $70,000 compared to 17.2% nationally. The employment status of those at least 15 was that 1,275 (56.2%) people were employed full-time, 339 (14.9%) were part-time, and 69 (3.0%) were unemployed.

== Education ==
Abbotsford School is a state full primary school for Year 1 to 8 students, with a roll of 274 students as of March 2026. It was established in 1953.
