= Natural Hazards Commission =

New Zealand government agency

- Toka Tū Ake (Māori)

Crown entity overview
- Formed: 1945
- Headquarters: Level 11, Majestic Centre, 100 Willis Street, Wellington; 41°17′18.13″S 174°46′28.09″E
- Minister responsible: David Seymour
- Crown entity executives: Chris Black, Chair; Tina Mitchell, Chief executive
- Website: eqc.govt.nz

The Natural Hazards Commission – Toka Tū Ake is a New Zealand Crown entity that invests in natural disaster research and education and provides natural disaster insurance to residential property owners.

It is a continuation of the Earthquake and War Damage Commission, set up in 1945 and known as the Earthquake Commission (EQC; Māori: Kōmihana Rūwhenua) from 1993 until 2024.

== History ==
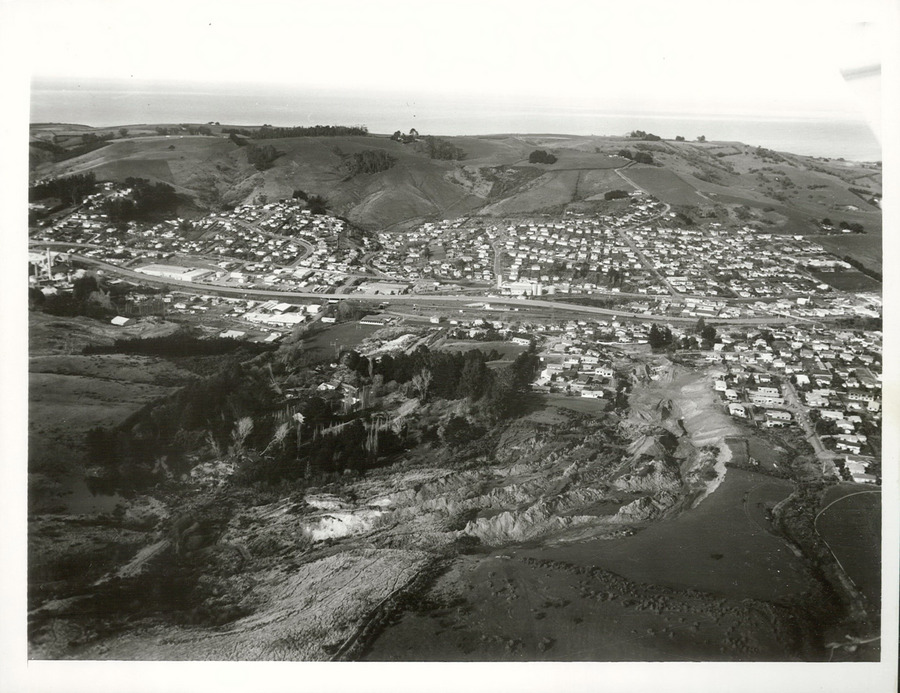
Abbotsford landslip, 1979

=== Earthquake and War Damage Act 1945 ===
Following several destructive earthquakes between 1929 and 1942, the government decided to set up a statutory scheme of disaster insurance, resulting in the Earthquake and War Damage Act 1945 and the creation of the Earthquake and War Damage Commission. The act provided for the establishment of an Earthquake and War Damage Fund and the scheme was financed by a compulsory levy imposed on all fire insurance policies. Responsibility for collecting the levies was placed on the insurance companies. The act was administered by the State Insurance Office, which provided staff and accounting services; Treasury determined the fund's investment policy. The levy was set at 5 cents per $100 of value and cover was limited to indemnity value. Over time, cover was extended to other natural disasters and to cover damage to land as well as to buildings. The need to cover land damage was identified in a report that followed the 1979 Abbotsford landslip in Dunedin when 69 homes were lost.

=== Earthquake Commission Act 1993 ===
The Earthquake Commission Act 1993 renamed the commission and introduced new changes to the system. The insurance was known as EQCover. It was now limited to residential buildings; cover for buildings was confirmed as being for replacement (new), not indemnity, value; and war damage cover was removed. These changes reduced the government's exposure to a very large potential liability and brought the EQC system more in line with current insurance industry practices. In 2001 the commission founded GeoNet along with GNS Science and Land Information New Zealand.

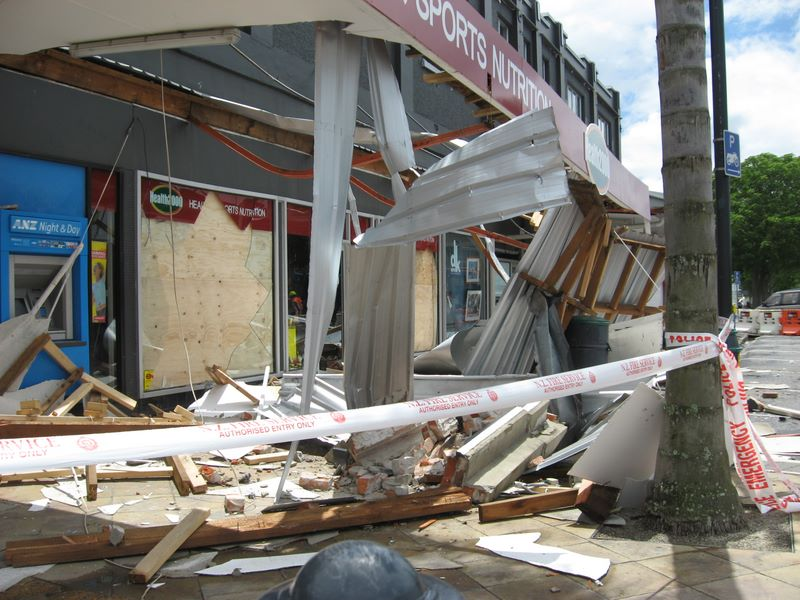
Gisborne Earthquake, 2007

In its first 65 years, the commission was called on to settle only relatively minor claims and the disaster fund continued to grow, reaching $6.1 billion by August 2010. The most notable natural disaster during this period was the 1979 Abbotsford landslip, near Dunedin, that caused the destruction of 69 houses. A subsequent commission of enquiry led, in 1984, to land damage being covered. Another noteworthy event was the 2007 Gisborne earthquake after which the EQC received over 3,100 claims and paid out over $16 million. A more significant series of payouts was required after the 2010–2011 Canterbury and Christchurch earthquakes (see § Canterbury earthquake sequence).

=== Natural Hazards Insurance Act 2023 ===
A bill proposing to update the legislation governing the Earthquake Commission was introduced into Parliament in March 2022. The overarching objectives of its changes were "to enable better community recovery from natural hazards, to clarify the role of the Commission and the cover provided by the Bill, and to enhance the durability and flexibility of the legislation." The bill passed and came into effect on 1 July 2024, changing the commission's name to the Natural Hazards Commission.

== Constitution and functions ==
The Natural Hazards Insurance Act 2023 is the primary legislation which sets the constitution and functions of the commission. Under Part 5 of the Act, the commission is a Crown entity under the Crown Entities Act 2004 with a board of between 5 and 9 members. Its primary objective is "to reduce the impact of natural hazards on people, property, and the community" and its more specific objectives are:

- to administer natural hazard cover, in particular by managing and settling claims, in a fair and timely manner in accordance with the Act.
- to contribute to the management of the financial risk to the Crown of providing natural hazard cover by managing the Fund, collecting the levy, and arranging reinsurance or other risk transfer products.
- to contribute to improved awareness and understanding of matters relating to natural hazards, improved natural hazard risk management, and improved readiness for, resilience to, and recovery from, natural hazards.
- to facilitate the arrangement by the Crown of reinsurance or other risk transfer products in respect of Crown risks beyond those covered in the Act.

Its statutory functions include:

- administering natural hazard cover, in particular by managing and settling claims.
- managing the Natural Hazard Fund, including by investing the Fund.
- collecting the Natural Hazard Fund levy, which is a compulsory levy added to all home insurance policies and transferred by private insurers to the Natural Hazard Fund for use when needed.
- arranging reinsurance or other risk transfer products in respect of all or part of natural hazard cover.
- facilitating and sharing research and education on matters related to natural hazard impacts, cover, resilience and planning.
- supporting the Minister in performing the Minister’s functions.
- monitoring, investigations and enforcement of possible offences against the Act.

As of June 2021, the commission had 310 permanent and fixed term staff.

== Claims settlement ==
This is determined by the Natural Hazards Insurance Act 2023 and by legal precedents created over time. Settlement money comes first from the Natural Disaster Fund, then from any re-insurers, and finally from the government, under a Crown guarantee. EQCover insures the policyholders building, personal property, and land.

Each claim is subject to an excess payable by the claimant and a capped maximum sum payable by the commission, known as 'the cap'. As of 2018, the excess and cap for a building claim were 1% and $100,000; for personal property they were 1% and $20,000; and for land they were 10% and a variable cap sum determined by a formula that includes current market land prices. Goods and services tax is added to the cap payable. These cap amounts are subject to change but in 2018 they remained the same as they were in 1993. In 1993, $100,000 was enough to cover the cost of rebuilding most houses: in 2018, building costs had increased more than fourfold. In most cases, private home insurance policies cover the cost of natural disaster damage above the amount paid by the commission.

== Canterbury earthquake sequence ==
On 4 September 2010, a powerful earthquake struck near Darfield in Canterbury. It began a series of earthquakes and aftershocks lasting till around 2016. The most destructive of these was the 22 February 2011 earthquake, centred close to Christchurch, in which 185 people died. The then Earthquake Commission (EQC) received over 470,000 claims, more than 15,000 families lost their homes, and repair costs were estimated at over $40 billion. EQC acknowledged several times during this period that the scale of the disaster was unprecedented. Speculation at the time about the scale of the damage proved to be significantly incorrect.

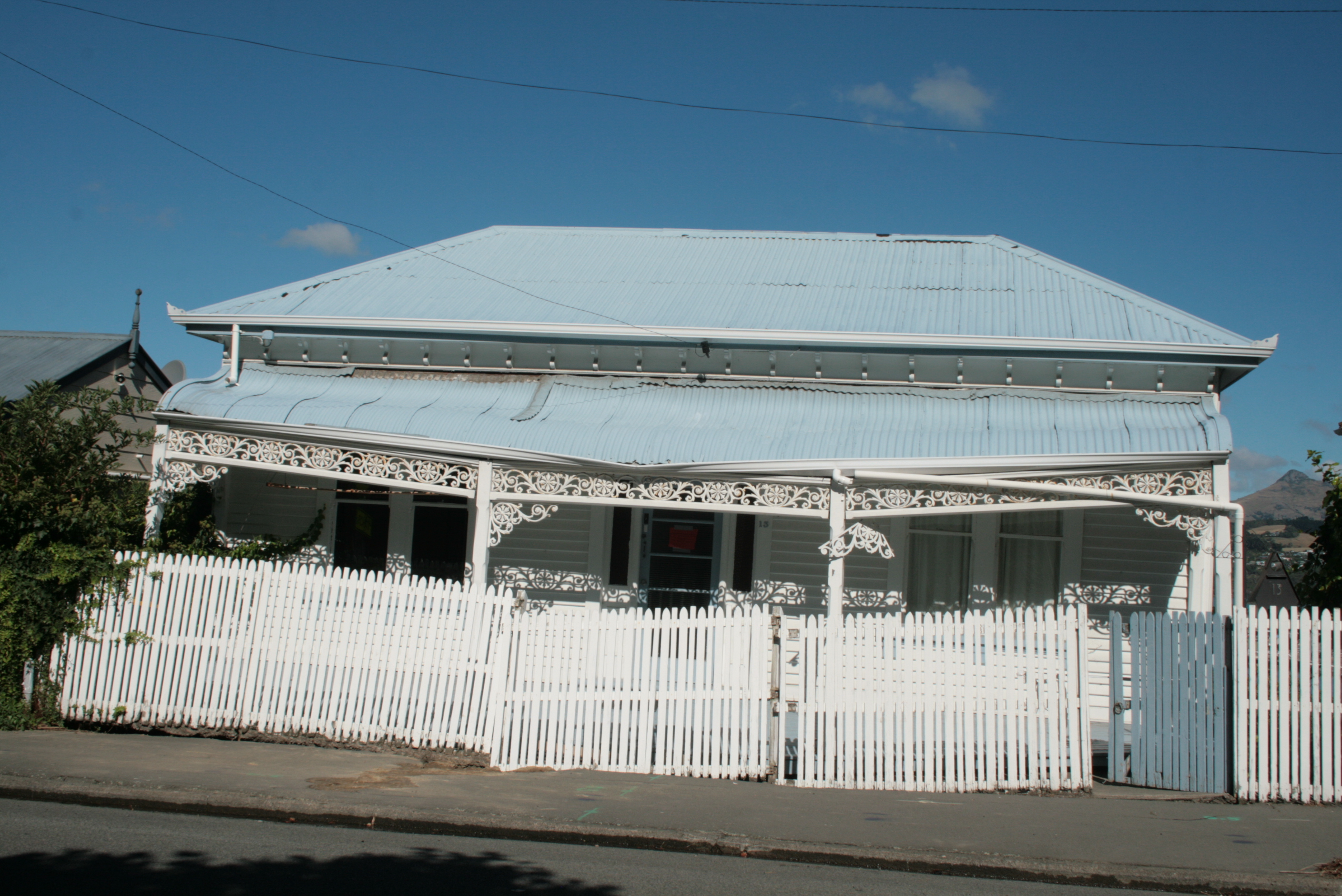
Earthquake damaged villa in Christchurch, March 2011

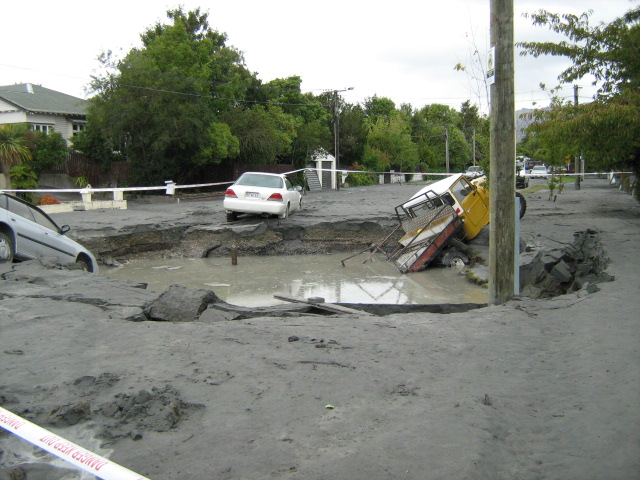
The result of land damage caused by ground liquefaction

In August 2016, the Insurance Council of New Zealand (ICNZ) stated that they were still being handed earthquake claims from EQC from the Christchurch earthquakes, and were thus not able to give a final cost to the insurance industry. In July 2016, EQC had 250 complex cases from Christchurch unresolved, 364 first-time repairs yet to be finished, and 6,144-second-time repairs being handled. If the damage stays "under cap" (i.e. it is up to $100,000 plus GST), EQC assessors dealt with the claim. When the claim goes "over cap", the settlement process is handed to the commercial insurer. This situation led to much double-handling and many inefficiencies, and has been widely criticised. In 2015, the Insurance Council of New Zealand submitted to the government that the process be changed and all assessments be handled by commercial insurers instead. Following the 2016 Kaikōura earthquake, the government agreed to this proposal in December 2016. It was also stated that "under cap" claims in Christchurch that have still to be settled will remain with EQC.

There is a $1.5 billion NZD excess for each earthquake event. If the required EQC payout exceeds the total of the excess and reinsurance ($4 billion NZD) the remainder of the payout is met by the EQC up to the limit of the Natural Disaster Fund. If the payout exceeds those assets, a Crown Guarantee requires that the Government pay the remainder.

=== EQC's handling of the earthquake claims ===
EQC's preferred method of settling claims till this point had been to make payment rather than to repair the damage. However, soon after the 4 September 2010 earthquake, EQC's then chairman, Michael Wintringham, confirmed in the commission's 2010–11 Annual Report that it had been asked by the government to settle claims by repairing buildings, (if the cost was not above cap, in which case EQC would cash settle and pass the claim to the owner's private insurance company).

This preference to repair was both to prevent the predicted upward spiral in building costs if repair money flooded the market, and to reduce the inevitable stress on home owners having to manage their own repairs. The then Chief Executive, Ian Simpson, prefaced these comments by stating: "It is important that we are accurate with our claims settlement process. Not just for our customers in a very difficult and uncertain time but also for the continued confidence of the global insurance market and the protection of the EQC funds for all New Zealanders". The protection of the Disaster Fund is a core responsibility of the commission. EQC's later response was to engage Fletcher Building, the country's largest construction company, as its agent to undertake the necessary repair work. The result was The Canterbury Home Repair Programme. In doing this, EQC indemnified Fletcher Building against any future liability. In June 2013, the Auditor-General reported on EQC's performance in managing the Canterbury Home Repair Programme. She found it had been "mixed".

For building claims, EQC chose first to assess properties to determine the extent and cost of repairing any damage. This was usually carried out by a two-person team comprising an assessor and an estimator. Assessors had no specific qualification other than to be seen as persons of good character with the ability to spot any unjustified or fraudulent claims. Retired police officers were often used. Estimators had building industry experience.

During this period, EQC pointed out the magnitude of the task it faced, its relative success, and the external factors that hindered it from providing an even better service. In 2013, commenting on a report it had commissioned, EQC said: "(the) earthquakes involved the kind of damage you would expect in wartime". It continued: "much has been achieved by EQC throughout the process of responding to Canterbury events as assessments have been completed, contents claims settled, emergency work undertaken and managed repairs underway in Christchurch".

Aside from settling claims, the commission had to deal with many litigation issues.

In 2011, the High Court decided to establish an Earthquake List to handle the expected large number of earthquake related cases. By February 2018, 1,048 claims had been filed, many of them involving EQC.

In March 2013, EQC was criticised after an employee accidentally sent a file containing details on more than 80,000 claims to a contractor. EQC obtained a High Court injunction preventing publication, which a disgruntled ex-employee and blogger breached by publishing an online link to the list. The blogger was found to be in contempt and fined.

In 2015, an earlier finding of "incompetence" against an engineer working for EQC was dismissed by the Chartered Professional Engineers Council (CPEC).

In 2015, a group of around 100 home owners launched proceedings against the EQC for not settling claims according to the standard required by the EQC Act. In April 2016, both parties agreed in a public statement that EQC's standard did comply with the act. The group then discontinued its claim. Both sides claimed success. The High Court awarded costs against the group.

=== Results of EQC's claim handling ===
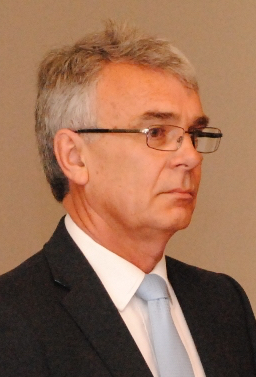
Maarten Wevers

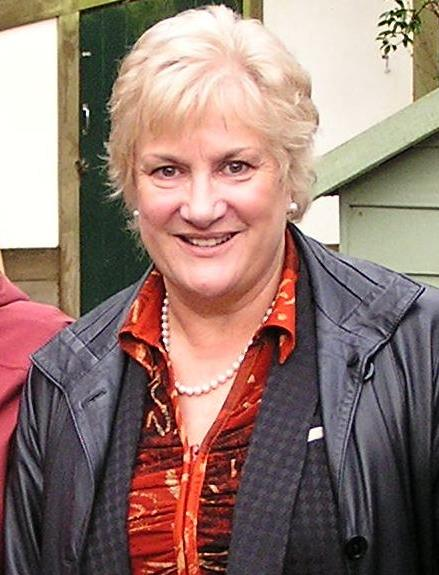
Annette King

Throughout the process, EQC received unwavering public support from the minister responsible, Gerry Brownlee. This support was contrasted by complaints of EQC mismanagement.

In October 2017, a new government was sworn in and the minister responsible changed. In February 2018, Megan Woods, the new minister, expressed her frustration with the EQC board and the pace of claims settlement. After seven years there were more than 2,600 claims still unresolved. She said she would appoint an independent ministerial advisor to work with the board and management who would report directly to her. The minister said: "I've made it clear I am not satisfied with where EQC is in respect of the Canterbury earthquake work seven years on from the 22 February event".

In response Maarten Wevers, the chairman and a lifelong public servant, resigned. He stated: "It is clear that the minister has no confidence in the board and staff of the commission. As chair, I take responsibility for that, and have stepped aside so that the minister can appoint someone whom she assesses will be able to do a better job." A few days later, the minister announced the appointment of Annette King as an interim chairperson, and said: "I'm keen to see a broadening of skills to include people who have been at the coalface and understand the reality faced by those people at the coalface".

An editorial in the Otago Daily Times, on the same day, read:

It beggars belief that more than seven years on from the most damaging event – Christchurch's deadly 22 February magnitude-6.3 quake – there are still residents waiting for their claims to be completed. It is a disgraceful state of affairs, particularly when EQC was established to provide a rapid, comprehensive recovery from disaster. These quakes were its first really big test – and it failed. There are still more than 2600 claims outstanding out of more than 470,000".

=== Public inquiry ===
In November 2018, then Minister Megan Woods announced an independent public inquiry into EQC's handling of the Canterbury earthquake claims chaired by Silvia Cartwright. Cartwright's report, released in April 2020, found that EQC was poorly prepared for the Canterbury earthquakes. She made a number of recommendations about clarifying EQC's role and improving its processes for claims handling and communicating with claimants. Cartwright said:

I fully accept that staff, managers and the board of EQC faced an overwhelming task from September 2010, made significantly worse by the ongoing major earthquakes that ensued, an absence of clear prior direction from government, added responsibilities and inadequate internal systems. In the circumstances, EQC's commitment and aspects of its response are commendable. It is necessary, however, to emphasise that its advance planning had many inadequacies, as did the undertaking of its functions after the major events began. The affected public has borne the burden of this.

In addition Cartwright noted the significant impact on the EQC reputation given their appalling mismanagement of the Canterbury earthquakes.

Unquestionably, there has been serious damage to EQC’s reputation; some deserved but much because it was simply unprepared for the role assigned to it. Prior to 2010, EQC was a trusted Crown entity, left to its own devices by the Government and not given much support for its attempts to secure and build its funds or to plan for the future. It was and continues to be successful in securing reinsurance in spite of New Zealand’s seismic risks and the recent catastrophic events, in part because of its commitment to research in understanding future hazards. EQC is derided by many, predominantly in Canterbury. A similar reaction to private insurers is also apparent, although more muted. But a body such as EQC—seen as the face of government—that had always been helpful and supportive prior to the Canterbury earthquakes was seen to be uncaring, miserly and inefficient. This reputation gathered pace and EQC is now frequently mentioned with distaste and even expletives.

== List of ministers ==
The following ministers have held responsibility for the commission. From 1993 until 2011, there were no separate ministerial appointments; under the Earthquake Commission Act 1993, the Minister of Finance was the responsible minister. Separate ministerial appointments resumed for the twelve years after the Canterbury and Christchurch earthquakes.

Key

Labour National

No.	Name	Portrait	Term of Office		Prime Minister
As Minister in charge of Earthquake and War Damage Commission
1	Ernest Corbett		26 November 1954	23 March 1956	Holland
2	Dean Eyre		23 March 1956	12 December 1957	Holland
2	Dean Eyre		23 March 1956	12 December 1957	Holyoake
3	Philip Skoglund		12 December 1957	12 December 1960	Nash
4	Arthur Kinsella		12 December 1960	20 December 1963	Holyoake
5	John Rae		20 December 1963	9 February 1972	Holyoake
6	George Gair		9 February 1972	8 December 1972	Marshall
7	Bill Fraser		8 December 1972	10 September 1974	Kirk
8	Hugh Watt		10 September 1974	12 March 1975	Rowling
9	Mick Connelly		12 March 1975	12 December 1975	Rowling
10	Bert Walker		12 December 1975	13 December 1978	Muldoon
11	Derek Quigley		13 December 1978	15 June 1982	Muldoon
12	Keith Allen		15 June 1982	26 July 1984	Muldoon
13	Fraser Colman		26 July 1984	15 August 1987	Lange
14	Roger Douglas		15 August 1987	14 December 1988	Lange
15	David Caygill		14 December 1988	2 November 1990	Lange
15	David Caygill		14 December 1988	2 November 1990	Palmer
15	David Caygill		14 December 1988	2 November 1990	Moore
16	Ruth Richardson		2 November 1990	29 November 1993	Bolger
As Minister responsible for the Earthquake Commission
17	Gerry Brownlee		14 December 2011	26 October 2017	Key
17	Gerry Brownlee		14 December 2011	26 October 2017	English
18	Megan Woods		26 October 2017	27 June 2019	Ardern
19	Grant Robertson		27 June 2019	6 November 2020	Ardern
20	David Clark		6 November 2020	1 February 2023	Ardern
20	David Clark		6 November 2020	1 February 2023	Hipkins
21	Deborah Russell		1 February 2023	27 November 2023	Hipkins

== See also ==
- Earthquake insurance
