= Saddle Hill (New Zealand) =

Hill in Dunedin, Otago Region, New Zealand

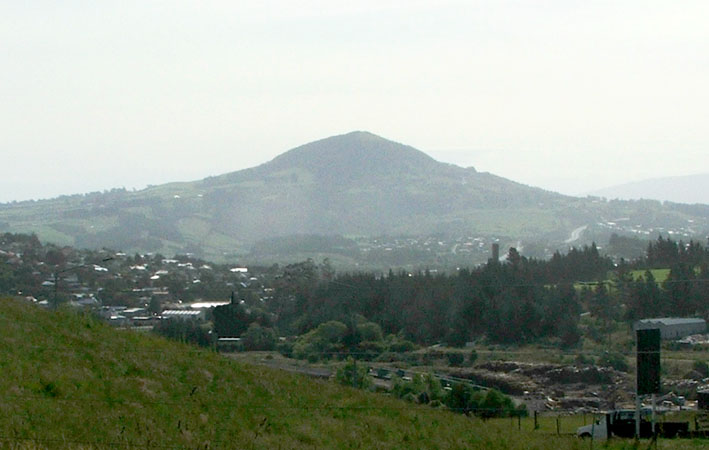
- Saddle Hill rises over the town of Green Island, as seen from Lookout Point, Dunedin.

Highest point
- Elevation: 473 m (1,552 ft)
- Parent peak: Silver Peak
- Isolation: to Flagstaff)
- Coordinates: 45°54′39″S 170°21′20″E

Naming
- Native name: Pukemakamaka (Māori)

Geography
- Country: New Zealand
- Region: Otago
- District: Dunedin

Geology
- Volcanic zone: Dunedin Volcano complex

Saddle Hill is a prominent landmark overlooking the northeastern end of the Taieri Plains in Otago, New Zealand. Within the limits of Dunedin city, it is located 18 kilometres to the west of the city centre, between Mosgiel and Green Island, and is clearly visible from many of the city's southern hill suburbs. A lookout on the northern slopes of the hill commands a good view across the plains, with Lake Waihola visible 25 kilometres to the west in clear weather.

The hill has two peaks with the eastern peak rising to 473 metres, and the western peak – Jeffray's Hill – rising to 431 metres.

Of largely volcanic origin, the hill is part of the extinct Dunedin Volcano complex, with a base of Cretaceous breccia overlaid with Miocene igneous rocks, these in turn overlaid with Cenozoic sediments. Erosion has revealed a volcanic plug on the western peak, giving the hill its distinct breast-like shape.

The hill was – along with Cape Saunders on the Otago Peninsula – one of just two places in Otago to have been named by Captain James Cook on his 1769 voyage of discovery. Cook described the hill in his journal as "a remarkable saddle". According to pre-European Māori tradition, the hill is the remains of a taniwha called Meremere and the northern and southern peaks of hill were known by Māori by the names Makamaka and Pikiwara respectively. Early settlers' maps occasionally record the hill as "Saddleback Hill".

A small coal seam on the hill was exploited by early European settlers, and was mined from as early as 1849, the first coal mine in the country. Jaffray's Hill (often wrongly called Jeffrey's Hill, and named for the Jaffray family who owned the land from 1849 until 1937), was extensively mined for basalt gravel until the mid-1980s. A DCC landscape architect reviewed the visual effects of quarrying in 2008 after concerns from local residents, and found the hill to be "relatively unchanged". This finding, however, has been successfully challenged in court with much public opinion against the continued quarrying.

== Demographics ==
The statistical area of Saddle Hill-Chain Hills covers 47.61 km^{2} (18.38 sq mi) and had an estimated population of 1,340 as of June 2025, with a population density of 28 people per km^{2}.

Historical population
Year	Pop.	±% p.a.
2006	1,071	—
2013	1,191	+1.53%
2018	1,224	+0.55%

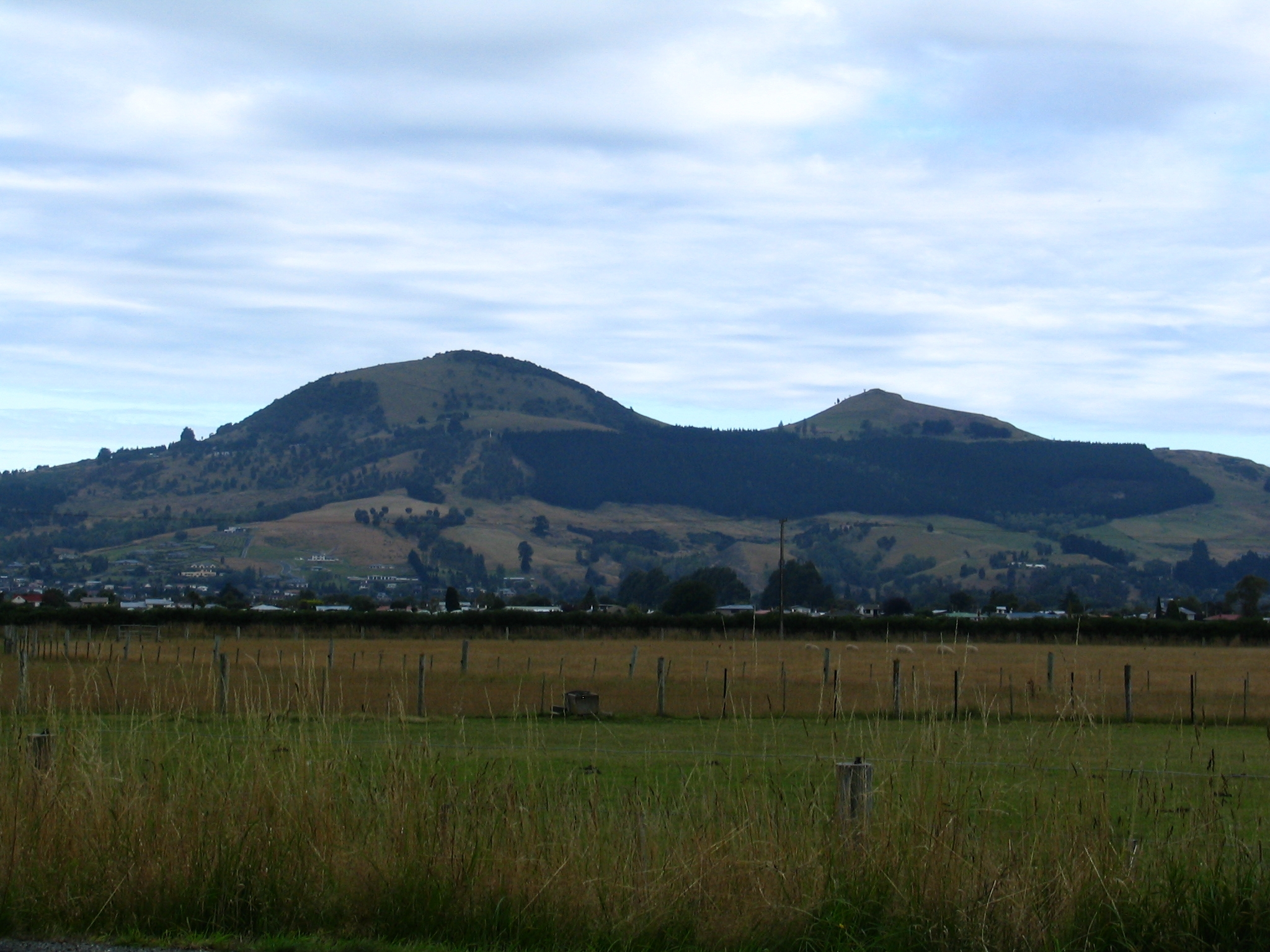
Saddle Hill from the Taieri Plains, showing the shape which gives the hill its name. East to the left.

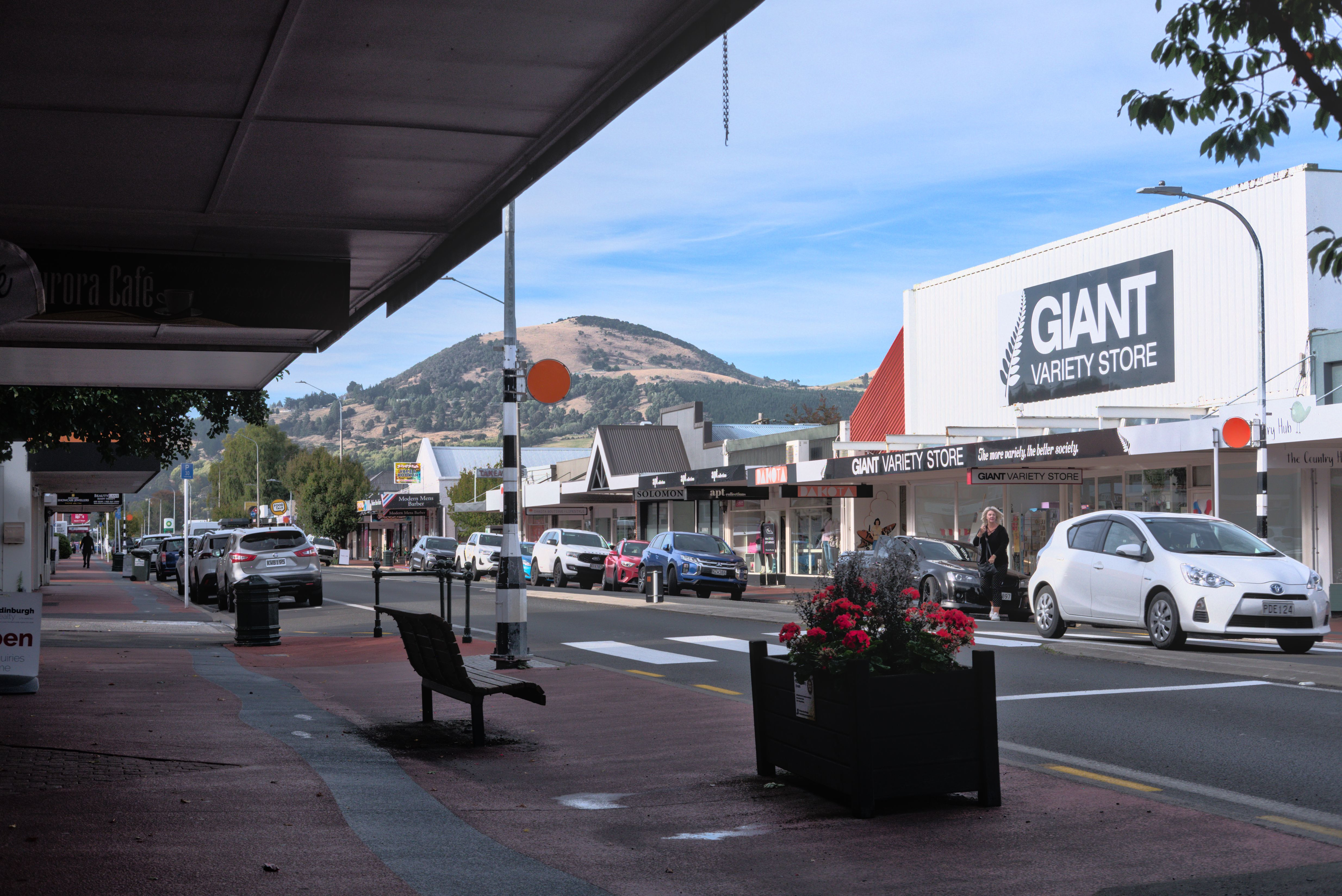
Saddle Hill from the main street of Mosgiel.

Saddle Hill-Chain Hills had a population of 1,224 at the 2018 New Zealand census, an increase of 33 people (2.8%) since the 2013 census, and an increase of 153 people (14.3%) since the 2006 census. There were 432 households, comprising 609 males and 612 females, giving a sex ratio of 1.0 males per female. The median age was 46.1 years (compared with 37.4 years nationally), with 192 people (15.7%) aged under 15 years, 216 (17.6%) aged 15 to 29, 657 (53.7%) aged 30 to 64, and 156 (12.7%) aged 65 or older.

Ethnicities were 94.1% European/Pākehā, 4.7% Māori, 0.7% Pasifika, 1.7% Asian, and 2.2% other ethnicities. People may identify with more than one ethnicity.

The percentage of people born overseas was 16.7, compared with 27.1% nationally.

Although some people chose not to answer the census's question about religious affiliation, 55.6% had no religion, 37.0% were Christian, 0.2% had Māori religious beliefs, 0.5% were Muslim, 0.5% were Buddhist and 1.2% had other religions.

Of those at least 15 years old, 267 (25.9%) people had a bachelor's or higher degree, and 150 (14.5%) people had no formal qualifications. The median income was $37,600, compared with $31,800 nationally. 252 people (24.4%) earned over $70,000 compared to 17.2% nationally. The employment status of those at least 15 was that 561 (54.4%) people were employed full-time, 171 (16.6%) were part-time, and 18 (1.7%) were unemployed.
