= Brighton, New Zealand =

Brighton
- Settlement
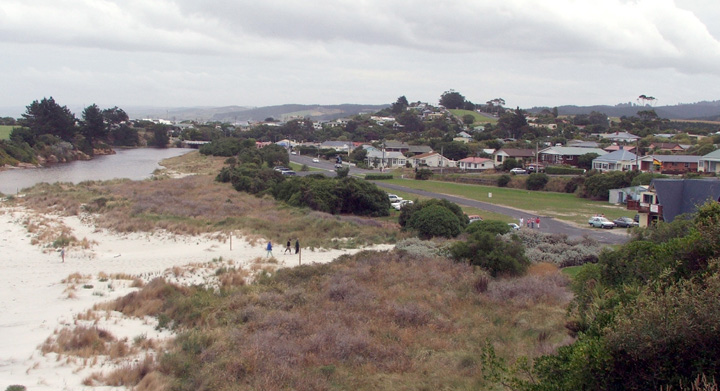
- Brighton
- Interactive map of Brighton
- Coordinates: 45°56′54.9″S 170°19′38.2″E
- Country: New Zealand
- Island: South Island
- Region: Otago
- District: Dunedin
- Community board: Saddle Hill Community Board
- Electorates: Taieri; Te Tai Tonga (Māori)

Government
  - Territorial authority: Dunedin City Council
  - Regional council: Otago Regional Council
  - Mayor of Dunedin: Sophie Barker
  - Taieri MP: Ingrid Leary
  - Te Tai Tonga MP: Tākuta Ferris

Area
  - Total: 3.40 km^{2} (1.31 sq mi)

Population (June 2025)
  - Total: 1,470
  - Density: 432/km^{2} (1,120/sq mi)
- Time zone: UTC+12 (NZST)
  - Summer (DST): UTC+13 (NZDT)
- Area code: 03
- Local iwi: Ngāi Tahu

Brighton is a small seaside town in Otago and within the city limits of Dunedin in New Zealand's South Island. It is located 20 kilometres southwest from the city centre on the Southern Scenic Route.

== History ==
The area around modern Brighton was not the site of permanent settlement by pre-colonial Māori, but was on their regular trails from their homes on Otago Peninsula to their traditional hunting grounds. Archaeological evidence suggests that the area around Brighton was the site of seal and sea lion hunting, as well as hunting of moa. Stone tool making may have also taken place around the area.

European settlement began in the 1860s. The town was named by an early resident, Hugh Williams, after Brighton in England. Early industries included coal mining, with lignite being plentiful at nearby Ocean View. The town was also a service town for the local farming community. During the early 20th century, the town was a popular resort for people from nearby Dunedin, with several guest houses. With increased motorised transport, the town became a commuter settlement and day-trip destination after World War II.

== Geography ==
Brighton is connected by coastal road with the Dunedin commuter settlement of Waldronville to the northeast (and from there to Dunedin itself) and with Taieri Mouth to the southwest. The settlement of Ocean View lies immediately to the east of Brighton, separated from it by a large bluff (simply known as "Big Rock") which juts towards the ocean to the northeast of Brighton Beach. The coast road winds around this headland on its entry to Brighton from Dunedin.

The town faces a small bay which includes a broad sheltered beach, Brighton Beach, and other beaches extend from here, north and east to Waldronville Lagoon and south and west to Taieri Mouth. They make the area popular for summer day trips from Dunedin. At the southern end of Brighton Beach is the mouth of the Otokia Creek, a small stream which has its sources 10 kilometres (6.2 mi) to the southwest in the coastal hills which separate the coast from the Taieri Plains. A small reserve and walkway links the town's main road with the mouth of the Otokia Creek. The reserve contains abundant birdlife, including oystercatchers and spoonbills.

== Demographics ==
Brighton covers 3.40 km^{2} (1.31 sq mi) and had an estimated population of 1,470 as of June 2025, with a population density of 432 people per km^{2}.

Historical population
Year	Pop.	±% p.a.
2006	1,509	—
2013	1,446	−0.61%
2018	1,473	+0.37%

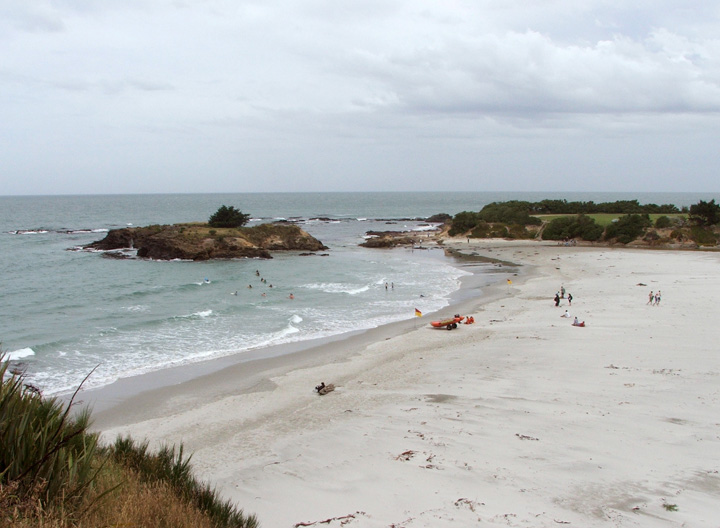
Brighton Beach, immediately to the southeast of the town

Brighton had a population of 1,473 at the 2018 New Zealand census, an increase of 27 people (1.9%) since the 2013 census, and a decrease of 36 people (−2.4%) since the 2006 census. There were 615 households, comprising 756 males and 717 females, giving a sex ratio of 1.05 males per female. The median age was 44.2 years (compared with 37.4 years nationally), with 264 people (17.9%) aged under 15 years, 213 (14.5%) aged 15 to 29, 768 (52.1%) aged 30 to 64, and 228 (15.5%) aged 65 or older.

Ethnicities were 93.5% European/Pākehā, 10.4% Māori, 1.6% Pasifika, 2.9% Asian, and 2.2% other ethnicities. People may identify with more than one ethnicity.

The percentage of people born overseas was 15.9, compared with 27.1% nationally.

Although some people chose not to answer the census's question about religious affiliation, 59.5% had no religion, 28.7% were Christian, 0.2% had Māori religious beliefs, 0.4% were Hindu, 0.2% were Buddhist and 2.4% had other religions.

Of those at least 15 years old, 243 (20.1%) people had a bachelor's or higher degree, and 240 (19.9%) people had no formal qualifications. The median income was $34,400, compared with $31,800 nationally. 186 people (15.4%) earned over $70,000 compared to 17.2% nationally. The employment status of those at least 15 was that 645 (53.3%) people were employed full-time, 204 (16.9%) were part-time, and 39 (3.2%) were unemployed.

== Education ==
Big Rock Primary School is a full primary school serving years 1 to 8 with a roll of 100 students as of July 2026. The school was created when Brighton and Ocean View schools merged in 2008.

== Notable residents ==
- James K. Baxter (1926–1972), a poet, grew up here.
- Jeff Wilson, a former New Zealand internal rugby union player and husband of Adine Wilson lived here.
- Adine Wilson is a New Zealand international netball player and wife of Jeff Wilson.

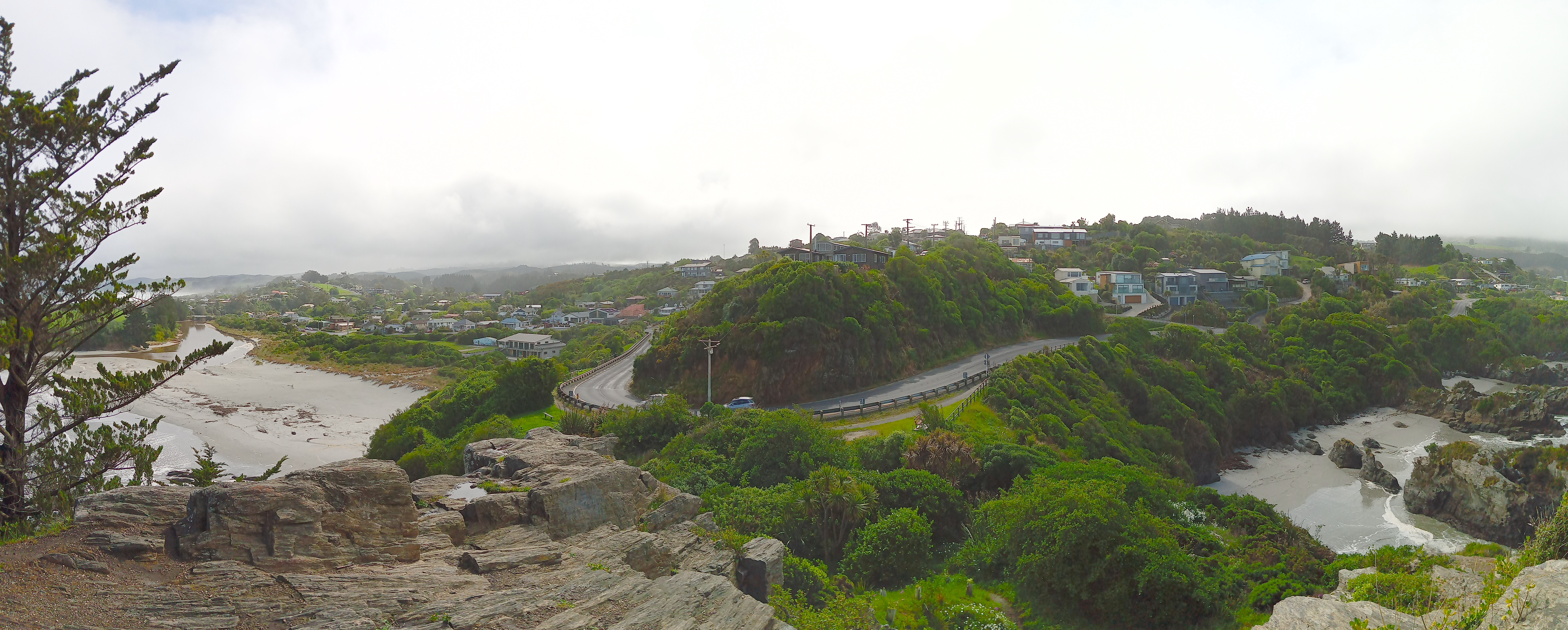
The coast road winds around Big Rock between Brighton (left) and Ocean View (right)
