= Green Island, New Zealand =

Suburb of Dunedin, New Zealand

Green Island
- Suburb
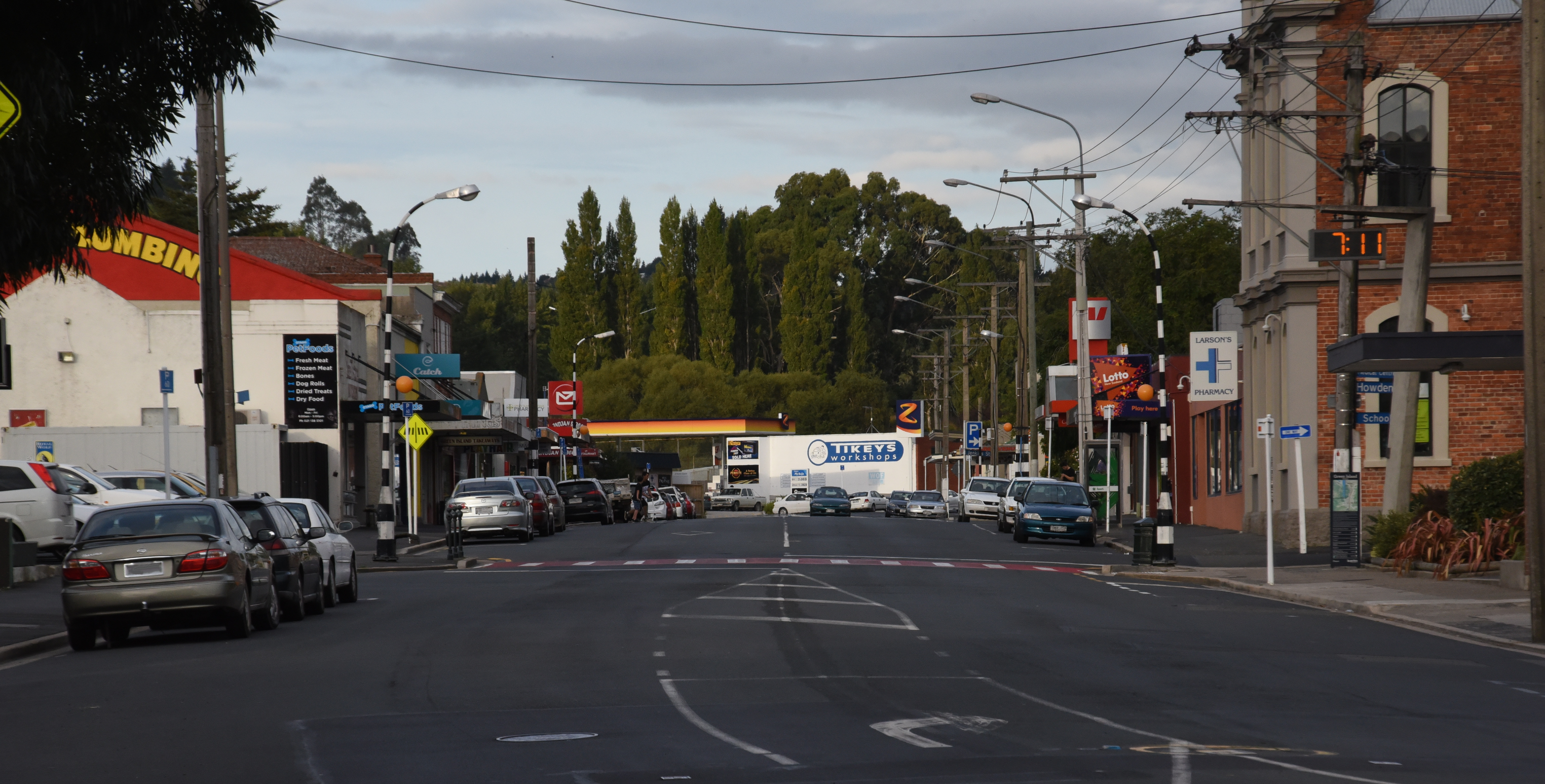
- Main South Road, Green Island
- Interactive map of Green Island
- Coordinates: 45°54′10″S 170°25′50″E
- Country: New Zealand
- City: Dunedin
- Local authority: Dunedin City Council

Area
  - Land: 364 ha (900 acres)

Population (June 2025)
  - Total: 2,480
  - Density: 681/km^{2} (1,760/sq mi)

Fairfield	Abbotsford	Kaikorai Valley
	Green Island	Burnside
Waldronville

Green Island is a suburb of Dunedin, New Zealand. Not an actual island, this former borough takes its name from the Green Island bush, uncleared native forest extending from the valley where the community is centred over the hills towards the coast. The name of the nearby offshore island — Green Island (Okaihe) — was used to identify the bush and, thus, also lent its name to the mainland suburb.

== Green Island suburb ==
Under the 1989 local government reforms, the city of Dunedin and its surrounding region was grouped into a territorial authority called Dunedin City. Under this system, Green Island is officially an outer suburb within this territorial authority.

Green Island is on State Highway 1, about 9 km (6 mi) west-southwest of the Octagon, Dunedin's city centre. Along with neighbouring Abbotsford, it is the westernmost suburb within Dunedin City's main urban area. Green Island's main economy is based on light and small scale heavy industry.

Prior to 1950 Green Island, and neighbouring Burnside, had a strong Brass Band and Silver Band communities.

=== Schools ===
Green Island School is a state full primary school serving years 1 to 8 with a roll of 132 students. The school first opened in 1863, and moved to the current site in 1883.

St Peter Chanel School is a Catholic state-integrated contributing primary school serving years 1 to 6. It is located on Main South Road, and has a roll of 47 students.

Both schools are coeducational. Rolls are as of March 2026.

=== Sport ===
==== Green Island Rugby Club ====
Established in 1884 and known as "The Grizzlies". The club's colours are green and gold. The club's home ground is Miller Park. In 2017 the club fielded three senior teams, one colts (U-20) team and a thriving school age grade consisting of 22 teams (ages 5–13). Green Island won the Premier Championship in 1972, 1973, 1978 and 2024. The clubs playing strength has dropped since the late 1990s with the decline of employment opportunities in the town and a general drop in player numbers throughout the Dunedin region, although the club has a thriving social side and a loyal band of supporters and has seen a resurgence off the field in recent years.

The club has in 2019 won the Speights Jug Trophy for winning the first round of Premier Rugby. They have also won numerous interclub trophies through this round.

The club has had six All Blacks:

- Greg Cooper
- Jackson Hemopo
- Lyn Jaffray
- Merv Jaffray
- Brian McKechnie
- Ben Smith

=== Other sport ===
Green Island's football club, Green Island FC, is based at Sunnyvale Park. The park is also the home of the Green Island Cricket Club. The Cricket Club has been highly successful in recent times winning multiple national club championships. The town is also home to a successful boxing club, and Green Island Rhythmic Gymnastics Club is a nationally ranked local sporting club.

== Demographics ==
Green Island covers 3.64 km^{2} (1.41 sq mi) and had an estimated population of 2,480 as of June 2025, with a population density of 681 people per km^{2}.

Historical population
Year	Pop.	±% p.a.
2006	2,283	—
2013	2,235	−0.30%
2018	2,319	+0.74%

Green Island had a population of 2,319 at the 2018 New Zealand census, an increase of 84 people (3.8%) since the 2013 census, and an increase of 36 people (1.6%) since the 2006 census. There were 948 households, comprising 1,155 males and 1,164 females, giving a sex ratio of 0.99 males per female. The median age was 38.9 years (compared with 37.4 years nationally), with 435 people (18.8%) aged under 15 years, 426 (18.4%) aged 15 to 29, 1,098 (47.3%) aged 30 to 64, and 354 (15.3%) aged 65 or older.

Ethnicities were 91.3% European/Pākehā, 10.3% Māori, 2.5% Pasifika, 3.1% Asian, and 2.8% other ethnicities. People may identify with more than one ethnicity.

The percentage of people born overseas was 9.2, compared with 27.1% nationally.

Although some people chose not to answer the census's question about religious affiliation, 60.7% had no religion, 28.1% were Christian, 0.4% had Māori religious beliefs, 0.1% were Hindu, 1.0% were Muslim, 0.4% were Buddhist and 2.1% had other religions.

Of those at least 15 years old, 249 (13.2%) people had a bachelor's or higher degree, and 459 (24.4%) people had no formal qualifications. The median income was $32,300, compared with $31,800 nationally. 168 people (8.9%) earned over $70,000 compared to 17.2% nationally. The employment status of those at least 15 was that 993 (52.7%) people were employed full-time, 255 (13.5%) were part-time, and 72 (3.8%) were unemployed.

== Abbotsford ==
Immediately to the north of Green Island, and only separated from it by the State Highway and South Island Main Trunk Railway is Abbotsford. Abbotsford is also a suburb within the Dunedin City territorial authority.
