= Chatham Island waka =

15th-century canoe discovered in 2024

- Material: Wood, fibres
- Discovered: August 2024; Chatham Island, Chatham Islands
- Discovered by: Vincent Dix and Nikau Dix

The remains of an oceangoing waka (canoe) were found in August 2024 on Chatham Island, the main island of New Zealand's Chatham Islands archipelago; the remains were hence called the Chatham Island waka. Parts of the waka have been dated to the 15th century and are a significant archaeological find relating to the migration of Polynesians in the Pacific.

== Background ==
The Chatham Islands is an archipelago about 860 kilometres (530 mi) to the east of the South Island of New Zealand. The resident population is confined to the two main islands: Chatham Island (known as Rēkohu in Moriori and Wharekauri in Māori) and Pitt Island (known as Rangihaute in Moriori and Rangiāuria in Māori). It was first populated by the Moriori people, who arrived from Eastern Polynesia and New Zealand in oceangoing waka (canoes). Moriori oral tradition suggests a date of first arrival in the Chatham Islands from East Polynesia between 1000 and 1200 CE, with a second wave of arrival, originating from New Zealand, around 1400 to 1500.

== Discovery and analysis ==
The waka was discovered in August 2024 by Vincent Dix and his son Nikau Dix on a beach on the northern coast of Chatham Island, after a nearby creek had been flooded by heavy rains. Beachcombing for timber, Nikau Dix collected some from the beach and took it back to their property. On inspection, he and his father discovered that the aged wood appeared to partially resemble a vessel. They returned to the area and making their way up a creek that drained onto the beach, and discovered more pieces of timber, some which showing signs of having been worked with tools. The authorities were alerted to the find. The site was partially excavated and the timber was determined to be that of an oceangoing waka.

Analysis of the timbers indicates that they are from a waka tuitui, used for passage on the ocean. It was constructed from a series of planks, a method of assembly used for vessels in the Pacific prior to 1400. After that time, in New Zealand, the size of trees meant that waka could be made from hollowed-out logs rather than the more complex planked technique. The initial report produced by researchers notes that the discovered waka may predate the divergence of the Moriori and Māori cultures, and be from a period when extensive ocean voyages were still taking place. According to Moriori leader Maui Solomon, oral traditions maintain that a waka, called 'Rangihoua', was wrecked along the island's north coast. He noted that this was "not far from where this waka has been found."

Some 450 individual parts of the waka have been recovered and placed in storage with more remnants remaining at the site, which has been sealed. The site of the excavation is on Department of Conservation land, adjacent to the Rix farm. The relatively exposed nature of the area prompted a recommendation that the remainder of the waka be removed with urgency.

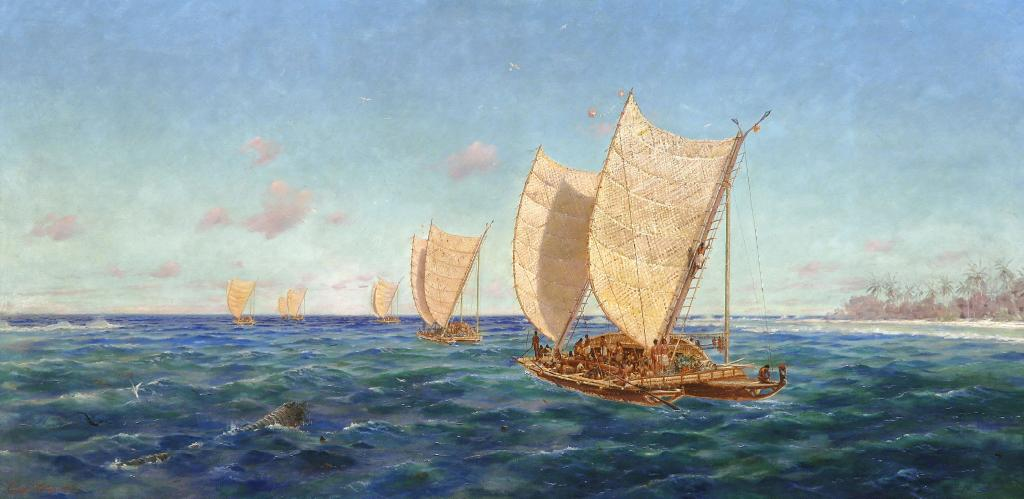
A 1906 painting, entitled Departure of the Six Canoes from Raratonga for New Zealand, AD1350, of oceangoing waka

The largest portion retrieved from the waka is a plank about 5 metres long, which has holes for fastenings. Smaller pieces include carved wood with shell and stone decorations, as well as remnants of fibres used as rope. A portion of a bottle gourd was found, along with woven material. At least of some of the fibres have been tentatively dated to around 1440 to 1470 using radiocarbon dating. One fibre sample was even older, dating to about 1415, and the material of the bottle gourd was assessed as being grown around 1400. It is likely that the rope fibres are much more contemporaneous with the last usage of the waka; therefore the waka itself may be older. At least some of the timber is New Zealand podocarp, but it has not been tested as of December 2025. Permission has not been granted for it to be radiocarbon dated as this involves destruction of the material being sampled.

As of May 2025, no other oceangoing waka with a comparable age to that of the Chatham Island has been found. The find is significant with implications for the understanding of the migration of Polynesian people across East Polynesia through to New Zealand.

== Ownership ==
Further excavations of the waka have been halted while its ownership is assessed, which is a legal requirement under New Zealand's Protected Objects Act 1975. Representatives of the Moriori have made a claim with the Ministry for Culture and Heritage on behalf of the tribe. Catherine Sixtus, a German national, commenced proceedings in the Māori Land Court for an injunction to halt the investigations into the waka. She alleged that the waka was made in one of the Hanseatic states of Germany with wood exported from New Zealand. It was further alleged that the waka was carved by Sydney Parkinson, the artist on Captain James Cook's 1768 expedition to the South Pacific in 1768–1771. Two other persons with links to Germany also claimed ownership of the waka. The presiding judge dismissed Sixtus's action, stating he did "not consider it is plausible on the basis of information currently before the Court that this waka originates from the Hanseatic states of Germany".

Potentially large portions of the waka may still be buried in the sand dunes at Chatham Island. An excavating archeologist considered only about 10% of the waka had been recovered but no action had been taken by Ministry for Culture and Heritage to excavate the site further. Concern regarding the potential risk of the loss of any remaining portions of the waka at the site due to storm events or coastal erosion led to legal action being taken against the ministry which had argued it was only responsible for the portions of the waka found, and not any that still remained in the sand dunes. The Māori Land Court disagreed with the ministry's position and in August 2026 determined that it was to held responsible for the remainder of the waka in addition to what had already been recovered.

== See also ==
- Anaweka waka: a 14th century waka discovered in 2012 on the northwestern coast of the South Island of New Zealand
- Papanui waka: a 15th century waka discovered in 2014 on the eastern coast of the South Island of New Zealand
