= Papanui waka =

Canoe discovered in 2014 in New Zealand

- Material: Wood
- Discovered: October 2014; Papanui Inlet, South Island, New Zealand
- Discovered by: Shar Briden

The remains of a waka (canoe) were found in October 2014 at Papanui Inlet on the Otago Peninsula of the South Island of New Zealand; the remains were hence called the Papanui waka. The waka has been dated to the mid- to late 15th century and is the second oldest in New Zealand, after the Anaweka waka.

== Background ==
New Zealand was the last major land mass to be discovered in the Pacific. It was likely first settled around 1,300 CE, by Polynesians sailing on ocean-going waka (canoes). These settlers were the forerunners of the Māori, the indigenous people of New Zealand. There has been a Māori presence at Papanui Inlet, near Dunedin, on the Otago Peninsula of the South Island for hundreds of years. The first in the area were the Waitahi people, and then Ngāti Māmoe. Ngāi Tahu subsequently became the dominant iwi (tribe) in the 18th century. Papanui Inlet has been well known since the early 20th century for its archaeological interest. Being exposed to coastal erosion has resulted in many archeological finds over the years.

== Discovery and analysis ==
The remnants of the waka were discovered by archeologist Shar Briden, with a 1.2 metres (3.9 ft) portion extending from sand dunes at Papanui Inlet in October 2014. She and her colleagues were monitoring the area for erosion which was exposing vulnerable material of archeological interest. Further excavation uncovered the remainder of the waka. The area had already been the site of previous waka-related finds; an outrigger was found in 2009 and some planks that may have been used to extend the freeboard of a waka hull had been excavated earlier in 2014.

The found portion of the waka was its hull and measured 6.33 metres (20.8 ft) in length and 0.65 metres (2.1 ft) at its widest point. It was formed from a single piece of wood from a totara tree (Podocarpus totara), which is endemic to New Zealand. The hull is missing the ends. Its interior includes a prominent ridge feature, proximate the gunwale, running down a substantial portion of its length. It also has a somewhat V-shaped profile, with a slightly flatted keel line that may have been useful for launching and beaching. Dilys Johns and her co-authors suggest that the waka was used as a coastal transport.

Flax fibres used as cordage were found in and around the waka during its excavation and these are highly likely to be contemporaneous with its last usage. These have been radiocarbon dated to the mid- to late 15th century, around 1435 to 1500. At the time of its discovery, it had been thought that the waka was most likely associated with Ngati Mamoe. However the age of the waka makes it more likely it dates back to the time of the Waitahi iwi.

The Papanui waka is the second oldest known waka to be found in New Zealand; the Anaweka waka, found in 2012, is believed to be an ocean-going waka dating to the 14th century.

== Preservation ==
Following its excavation, it was stored in a purpose built container of water at Ōtākou Marae. Immersion in water is important for preservation of the wood. It was subsequently transferred into a solution of polyethylene glycol, which will displace the water in the hull at a cellular level. The waka will in due course be dried out.

== See also ==
- Chatham Island waka
