= Papanui Inlet =

Coordinates: 45°50′50″S 170°41′40″E

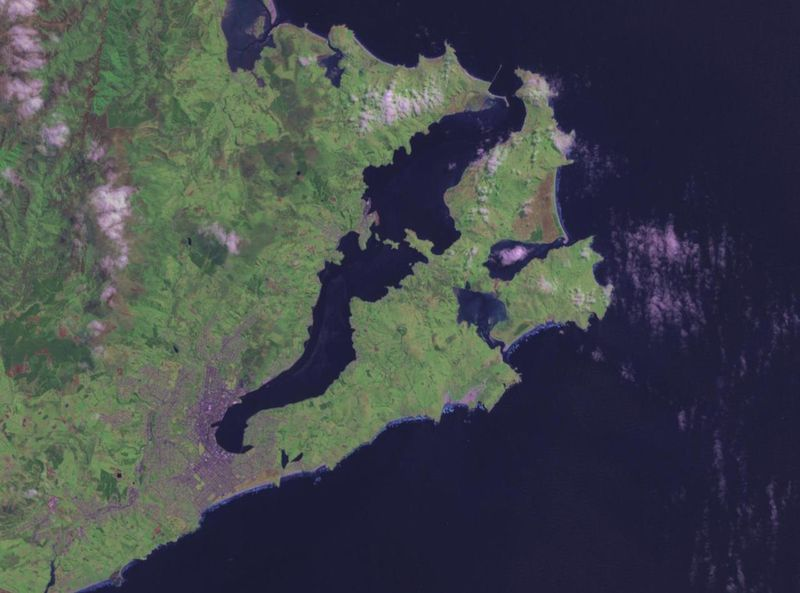
Papanui Inlet (upper, right) and Hoopers Inlet (lower, left) are clearly visible on this NASA satellite photo of Otago Peninsula and Otago Harbour.

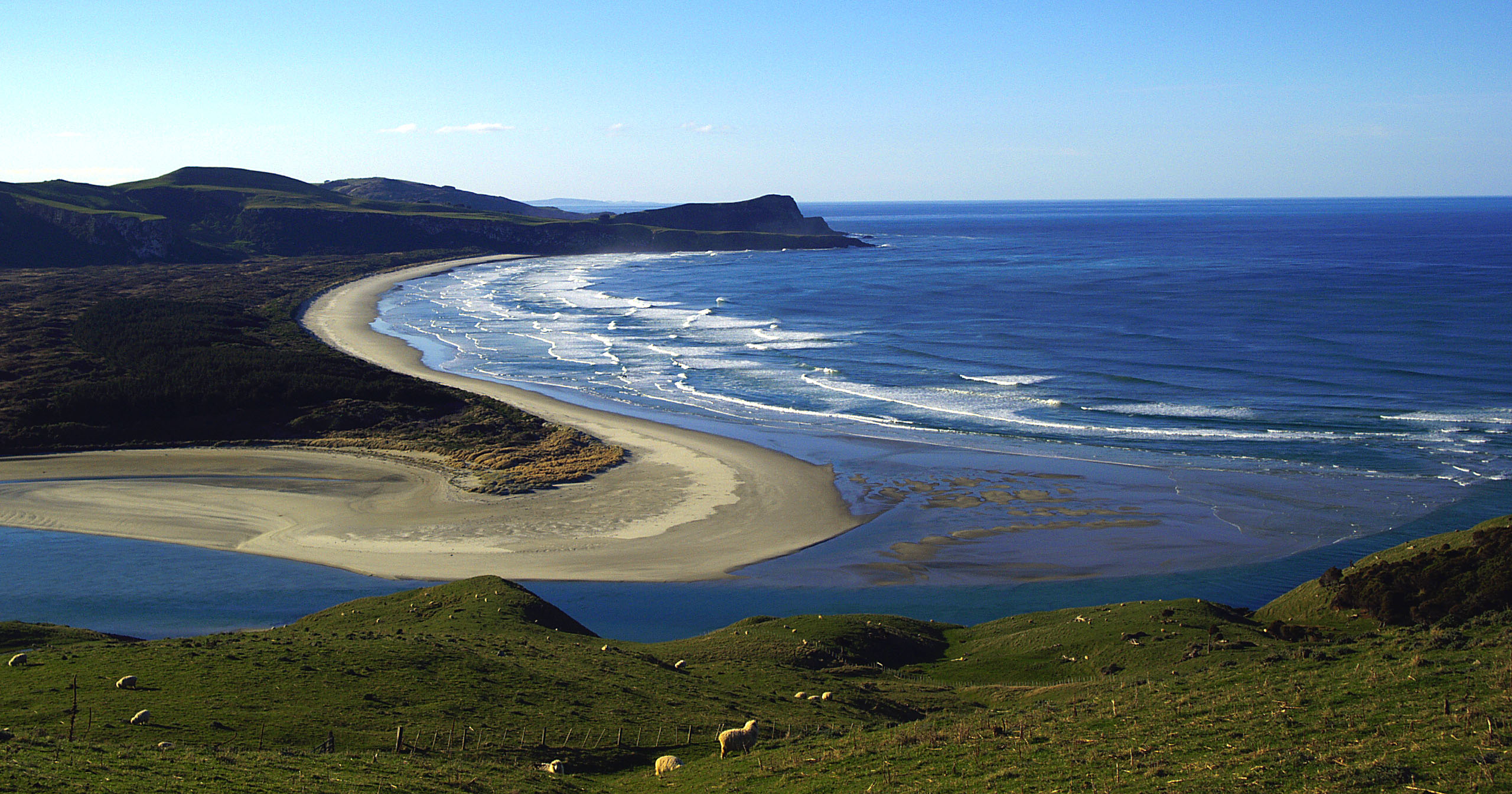
Looking north from near Cape Saunders past the mouth of Papanui Inlet to Victory Beach

Papanui Inlet is the northernmost of two large inlets in the Pacific coast of Otago Peninsula, in the South Island of New Zealand.

The inlet's name is of Māori origin, and means large flat area (papa, flat area, and nui, big). 'Papanui' originally referred to the Papanui peninsula. The inlet was known by Māori as Makahoe. The name 'Papanui' was adopted also for the inlet after European settlement.

Like its near neighbour, Hoopers Inlet, Papanui Inlet is known for its diverse bird life. The inlet lies 3 km to the east of Portobello. A short road linking the two inlets enables Papanui Inlet to be reached by road from both Portobello and the city of Dunedin (of which it is administratively a part), the centre of which lies 18 kilometres to the west. Both inlets are shallow, becoming predominantly sand and mud flats at low tide.

The mouth of Papanui Inlet opens to the east, directly into the Pacific Ocean. While the southern shore of the inlet is flanked by steep hills, the northern shore is dominated by a large area of flat land known as Okia Flat, much of which is protected as Okia Reserve. Beyond this lies Wickliffe Bay, which is bordered by Victory Beach, Otago Peninsula's longest beach. This flat land effectively narrows the mouth of the inlet. The remains of the 1861 wreck of the SS Victory (for which the beach is named) are still visible close to the inlet's mouth at low tide. Both this wreck and a historic midden close to the southern shore of the inlet's mouth are registered as Category II historic sites by the New Zealand Historic Places Trust. In October 2014, the remnants of a canoe, the Papanui waka was found in the sand dunes of the area. Dating to the 15th century, likely contemporary with the Waitaha iwi's occupation of the area, it is the second oldest known waka in New Zealand.

Papanui Inlet is separated from Hoopers Inlet by a strip of land which is the isthmus to a hilly peninsula containing Cape Saunders and the peninsula's highest point, the 408-metre Mount Charles. A road, leading to Cape Saunders, skirts the southern shore of the inlet.

The inlet is registered as a Coastal Protection Area by the Otago Regional Council, due to its cultural and spiritual values to the Kāi Tahu iwi, its status as an important habitat for bird and sea life, and for its historic sites.
