= Anaweka waka =

Canoe discovered in 2012 in New Zealand

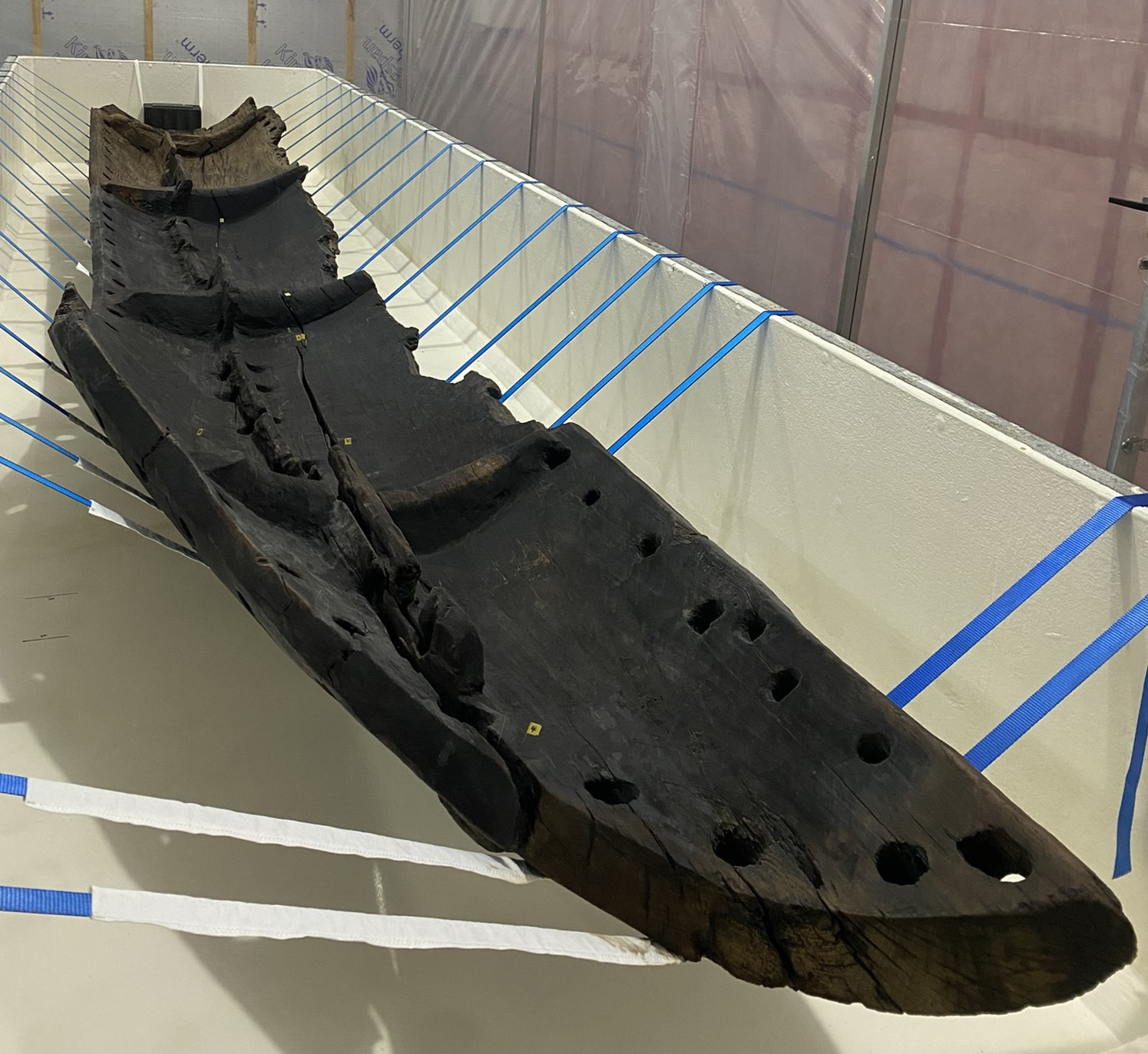
- The waka in storage
- Material: Wood
- Discovered: January 2012; Anaweka estuary, South Island, New Zealand
- Discovered by: Flynn Nicholls

The remains of a waka (canoe) were found in January 2012 at Anaweka estuary on the northwestern coast of the South Island of New Zealand; the remains were hence called the Anaweka waka. The waka has been dated to the 14th century and is a significant archaeological find relating to the migration of Polynesians to New Zealand.

== Background ==
New Zealand was the last major land mass to be discovered in the Pacific. It was likely first settled around 1,300 CE, by Polynesians sailing on ocean-going waka (canoes). These settlers were the forerunners of the Māori, the indigenous people of New Zealand. The waka used on the voyages to New Zealand were likely to have been double-hulled, with triangular sails, about 20 metres (66 ft) in length, and carried a crew of up to 15 people. It is likely that the settler population of Māori originated from different parts of Eastern Polynesia, most notably the Society Islands and the Cook Islands. Eastern Polynesians had a strong navigation tradition, acquired through multiple generations of experience of sea-going voyages, and they were quite capable journeying of long distances from these places to New Zealand.

== Discovery and analysis ==
The remnants of the waka were discovered in January 2012 by Flynn Nicholls at the mouth of Anaweka estuary, on the northwestern coast of New Zealand's South Island. His family had been picnicking in the area when he noticed a portion of the waka protruding from in sand dunes. The wood had become exposed as a result of a recent storm. It was well preserved due to being saturated with water but, until being exposed after the storm event, buried in an anaerobic environment.

On excavation and analysis, it was determined that what was found was a 6 metres (20 ft) portion of the hull of an ocean-going waka. Likely to be of a composite construction, several large components, such as the hull portion found at Anaweka, would have been knitted or otherwise connected together. The hull portion lacked a keel or gunwale section.

It was contoured at one end, and for this reason it is likely to have formed part of either the bow or stern portion of the hull. The other end included a butt joint which would allowed it to be connected to another portion of the hull. About its perimeter are provided a series of lashing holes. Some of these holes were found to have been filled with caulking. The surface that would have formed the external side of the hull has been worked to be relatively smooth, while the inner surface is clearly worked with adaze-like tools. Four vertical ribs, extending from what would have been the bottom edge, proximate the keel, to the upper edge, proximate the gunwales, of the hull, are carved into the inner surface. A longitudinal stringer extends from the contoured end of the hull portion through to the fourth and last of the ribs. It is speculated that this would have provided some structural integrity along the length of the hull. This was provided with lashing holes, so may have also been used as attachment points for ancillary equipment, and showed signs of repair.

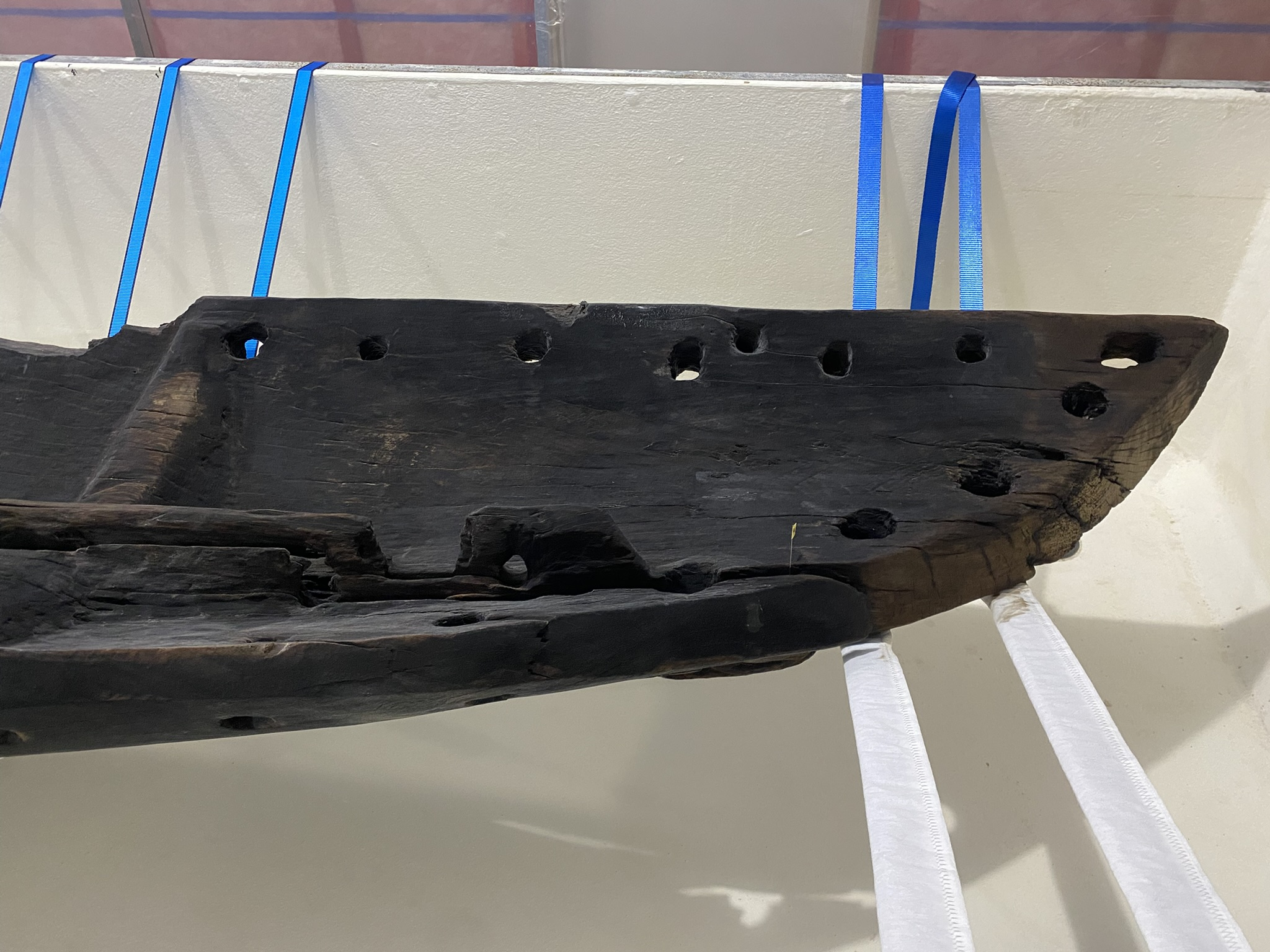
The inner side of the contoured end of the waka, clearly showing the lashing holes and the longitudinal stringer

A feature of note is the presence, on the outer surface near the contoured end of the hull portion, of a raised relief carving of a sea turtle. These animals are of cultural significance to Eastern Polynesians and often appear in artwork from that region. However the usage of the turtle in Māori culture is relatively rare, with only a few instances being known. That it is present on the hull portion may be indicative of a connection to the traditions of Eastern Polynesia at the time of the construction of the waka. Furthermore, the presence of the ribs and stringers are indicative of East Polynesian techniques employed in the construction of waka. Conventional Māori waka, at least the time of first contact with Europeans, lacked these features. As such, the Anaweka waka is argued by researchers Dilys Johns, Geoffrey Irwin and Yun K. Sung to be "an early adaptation of East Polynesian canoe technology to New Zealand".

The found portion of the waka was formed from a single piece of wood from a mataī tree (Prumnopitys taxifolia), which is a New Zealand species. On analysis, the caulking was determined to be bark from the tōtara tree (Podocarpus totara), which had been repeatedly folded and pounded. Therefore, the waka was most likely made in New Zealand. Using radiocarbon dating techniques, the wood has been determined to date to around 1226 to 1280. The caulking, which is more likely to be contemporaneous with the usage of the waka, has been dated to around 1313 to 1415; the width of the age band may be due to some caulking resulting from repair work, rather than at the time of construction. It is likely have seen repeated use up until at least 1400, within a few generations of the first arrival of East Polynesians to New Zealand. This dating is supported by archaeological evidence at nearby sites of human settlement in the area.

== Preservation ==
On recovery from the site, the waka was stored at a building at dairy company Fonterra's Tākaka site at nearby Golden Bay and preservation work, supervised by archaeologists from the University of Auckland commenced. In order to remove chlorides from the wood, a standard conservation technique used for wooden objects that has been buried for a lengthy period of time was applied; the waka was immersed in polyethylene glycol (PEG) for several years. The PEG permeates into the wood and replaces its water content. In April 2023, it commenced a controlled, drying out process, which is likely to take up to five years.

In July 2025, it was proposed to display the waka at a purpose built facility at Pioneer Park next to the Golden Bay Museum, in Tākaka. A majority of public submissions on the matter supported Pioneer Park as the preferred location to display the waka. This was duly approved by the Tasman District Council in August 2026, with construction of a dedicated facility expected to commence in late 2028. An existing memorial at the site, the Tākaka Pioneers' Memorial, will be relocated.

== Ownership ==
When the waka was discovered in 2012, the Ministry for Culture and Heritage took custody of it pursuant to the Protected Objects Act 1975. This legislation requires it to take the necessary steps to protect and preserve items deemed taonga tūturu, which are protected objects of cultural significance to Māori, until its ownership is established. The waka was deemed to be one such item. Ngāti Kuia and Manawhenua ki Mōhua, which represents three local iwi (tribes), have both made claims of ownership, which will be assessed by the Māori Land Court.

== See also ==
- Papanui waka: a 15th century waka discovered in 2014 on the eastern coast of the South Island of New Zealand
- Chatham Island waka: a 15th-century waka discovered in 2024 on Chatham Island
