= Victory Beach =

Beach in New Zealand

Victory Beach is located on the Pacific Ocean coast of the Otago Peninsula, in the South Island of New Zealand. It is 24 kilometres (15 mi) by road from Dunedin city centre and 7 kilometres (4.3 mi) from the nearby town of Portobello. The longest beach on the peninsula, Victory Beach is located northeast of the entrance to Papanui Inlet and stretches for 3.2 kilometres (2.0 mi). The beach's name derives from the wreck of the SS Victory on the beach in 1861.

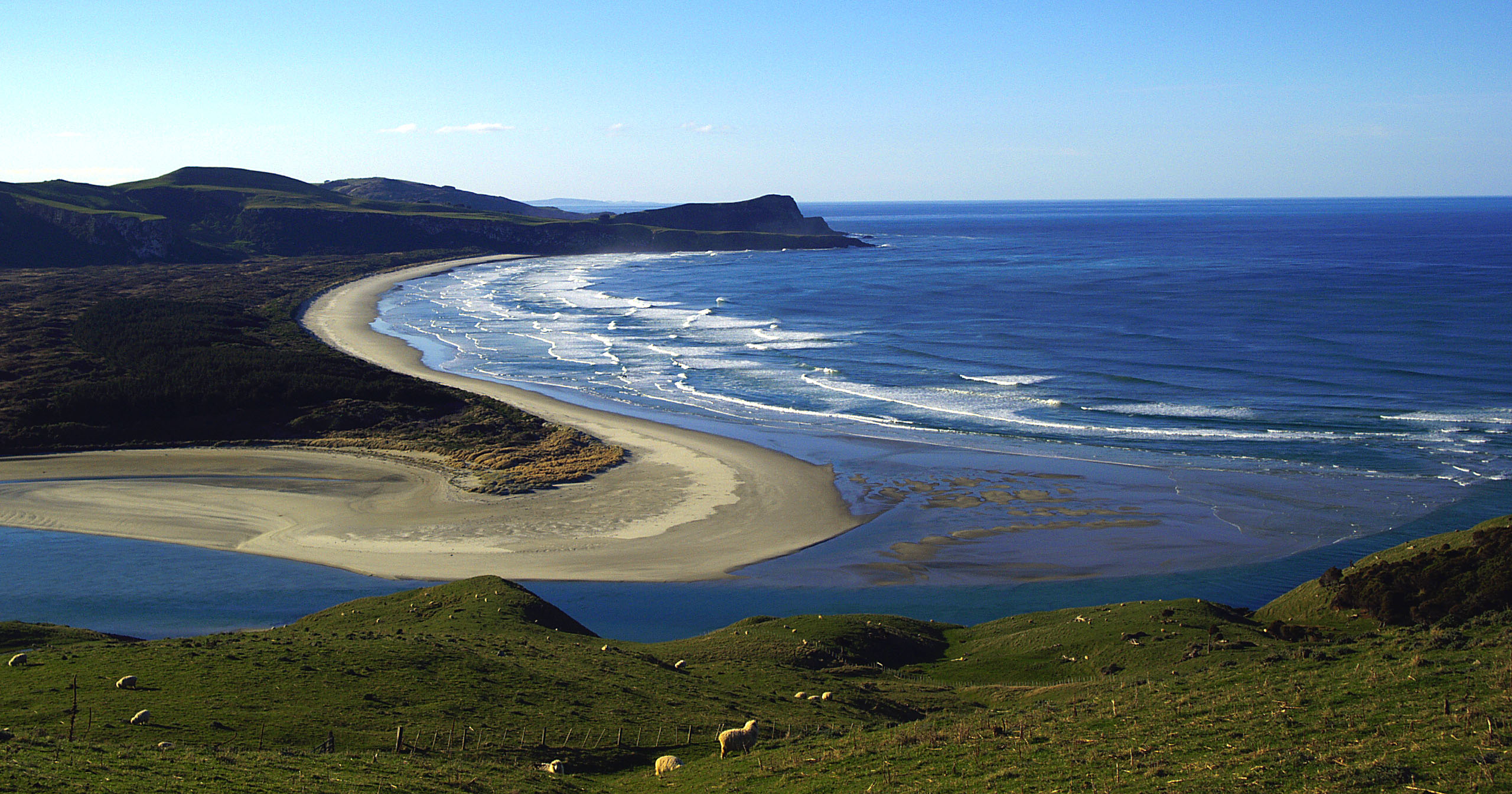
Victory Beach from the south

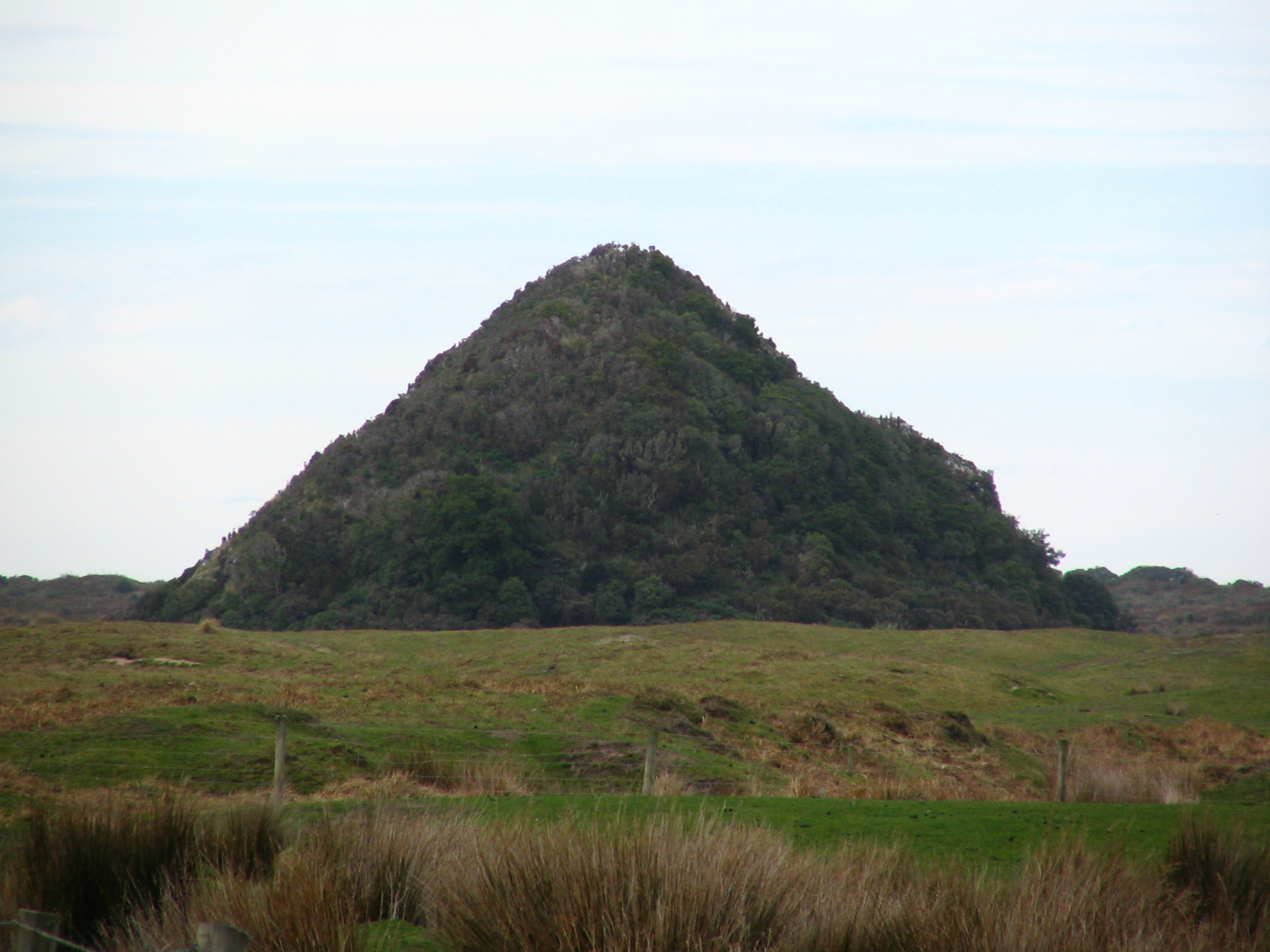
Western side of Little Pyramid

== Physical geography ==
Victory Beach is approximately 3.2 kilometres (2.0 mi) long and faces close to due east. To the north it ends at the cliffs of Kaika Hill, which project out into the sea to form the headland of Te Wharekaiwi. To the south it peters out in a tidal sandflat at the mouth of Papanui Inlet. The beach is backed by a series of high sand dunes, which protect the swampy area behind called Okia Flat. The beach and headlands to the north and south form Wickliffe Bay, so named for the ship John Wickliffe, which – along with the Philip Laing – brought the first permanent European settlers to Otago.

Okia Flat is dominated by two large outcrops of columnar basalt known as the Pyramids; respectively the Large Pyramid or Pū-wheke-o-Kia, to the north, and the Little Pyramid or Te Matai o Kia to the south. The Little Pyramid has a cave near its base, carved out by wave erosion.

=== Access ===
Access to the beach is via Dick Road, a narrow metalled road which begins at the meeting of Weir Road and Papanui Inlet Road. Both of these are most easily accessed from Portobello on the Otago Harbour coast of the Peninsula – the former via Harington Point Road and the latter via Allans Beach Road and Sheppard Road. At the end of Dick Road, a 2 kilometres (1.2 mi) walking track leads to the beach past the Pyramids. A detour from the walking track leads up the Little Pyramid to a viewing site. The track thereafter splits to form a loop track to the beach with a network of further tracks over the dunes. Joins in the track are marked by yellow and black poles, but these can be inconspicuous.

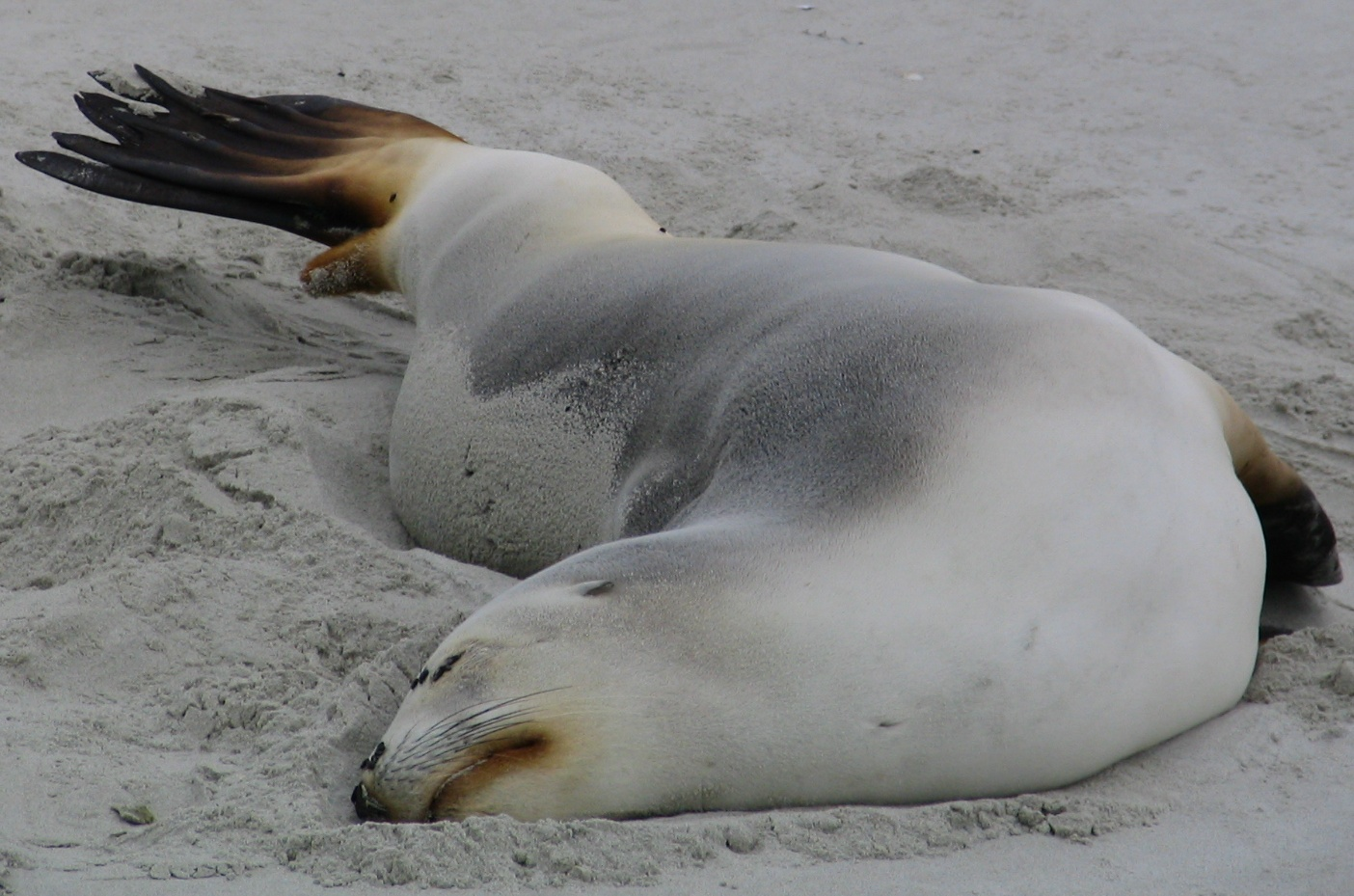
A New Zealand sea lion asleep on Victory Beach

== Wildlife and vegetation ==
Administered partly by the Yellow-eyed Penguin Trust, the beach is a habitat for many rare species, notably yellow-eyed penguins. Other notable birds found in the area include royal spoonbills, and the beach is located close to the royal albatross breeding colony at Taiaroa Head. Both New Zealand sea lions and New Zealand fur seals are also found in the area. Skinks and geckos are common in the grass of Okia Flat. Though they are not frequent visitors, the Flat is reputed to be the most likely place in Dunedin for elephant seal sightings.

The native pīkao grass of the Flat has largely been displaced by marram grass, as well as other introduced plants such as lupins and exotic grasses. Conservation efforts are under way to restore the pīkao. There are dense thickets of tree nettle, including some about the base of the Little Pyramid. Visitors are advised to avoid skin contact with this plant.

== History ==
=== Māori occupation ===
The cave at the base of the Little Pyramid is a major archaeological site. Māori oral history states that it was used for shelter by a warrior recovering from his wounds. There is evidence of occupation from over 500 years ago, including middens, adzes, and bones of moa and humans.

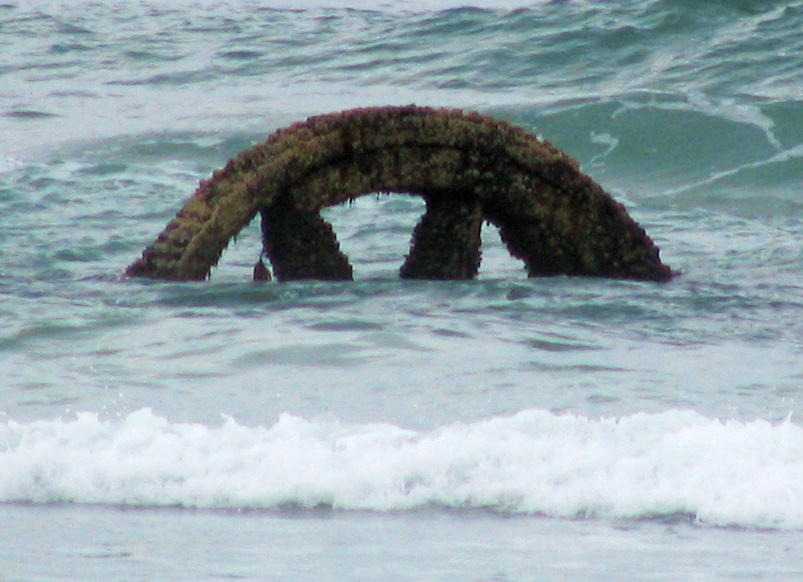
Flywheel from the SS Victory, in the surf at low tide

=== Victory wreck ===
The steamship SS Victory departed Port Chalmers bound for Melbourne at 4:30 pm on 3 July 1861, carrying passengers, mail and cargo. It ran aground at the southern end of the beach (45.8425°S 170.7321°E) at about 6 pm, seven minutes after chief mate George Hand took charge of the ship. Captain James Toogood ran the engines full astern for around 90 minutes, but the ship was embedded in 6–7 feet of sand, so the passengers and mail were unloaded. There were no deaths. Hand was found guilty of being intoxicated and in neglect of duty, and sentenced to serve three months hard labour on 20 July; the court also criticised the captain. On 24 July and the following day the ship's cargo, equipment and hull were auctioned off on the beach, recovering around £1,900 from an estimated value of £25,000.

=== Modern history ===
The beach was used as a location for the television movie Out of Ashes, starring Elisabeth Lanz.

Victory Beach is occasionally used by naturists for nude sunbathing. New Zealand has no official nude beaches, as public nudity is legal on any beach where it is "known to occur".
