= Waka hurdling =

Maori sporting competition

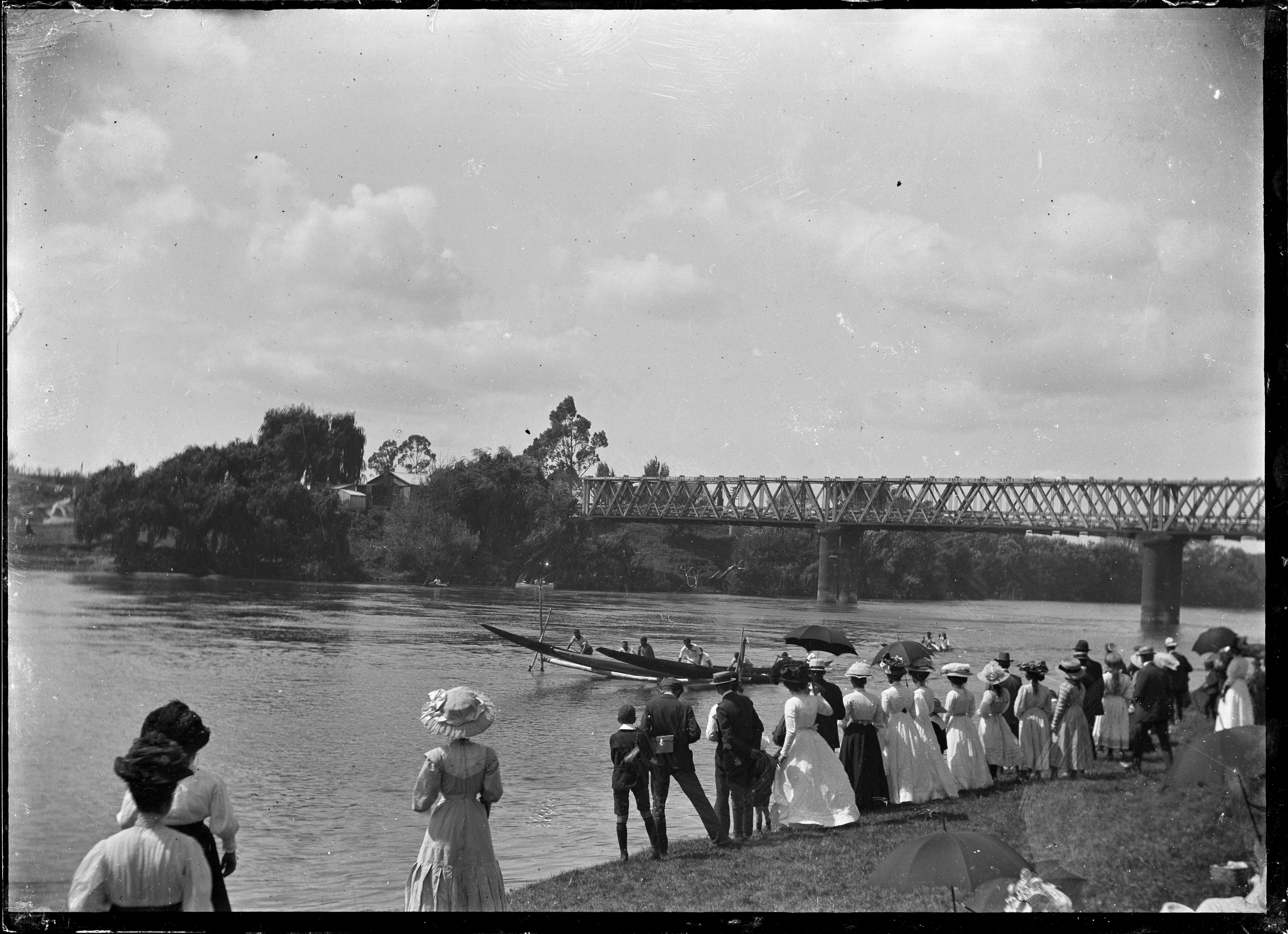
- Waka hurdle race on the Waikato River at Ngāruawāhia, 1910
- Nicknames: Waka peke

Characteristics
- Contact: No
- Team members: Two per waka
- Type: Boat sport
- Venue: River or lake

Presence
- Country or region: New Zealand

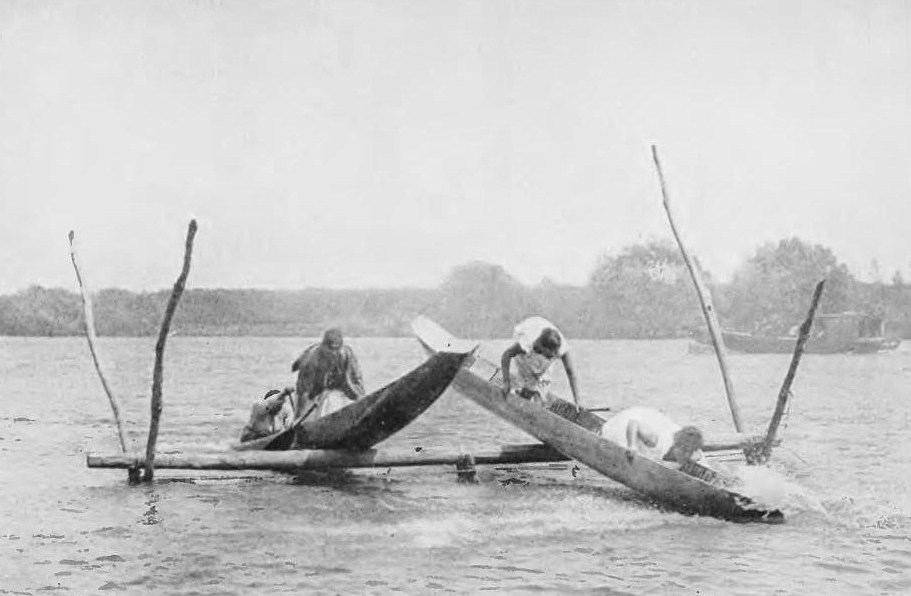
Women's teams competing

Waka hurdling, also sometimes called waka peke (jumping waka), is a Māori sporting competition of jumping unornamented waka tīwai (river canoes) over wooden beams set in the water. There have been attempts to revive the sport and keep the tradition going. The Auckland Museum has a photograph of the sport and spectators. The hurdles are made of long tree branches. Albert Percy Godber photographed the sport in 1910. The competition is part of the festivities of traditional Māori regattas.

== See also ==
- Waka jumping
