= John Langridge (merchant) =

New Zealand shopkeeper (1864–1931)

- Langridge in Tākaka in his captain's uniform
- Born: John Joshua Langridge; 1864; Temuka, New Zealand
- Died: 20 February 1931 (aged 66–67); Waipukurau, New Zealand
- Occupation: shopkeeper
- Spouse: Bessie Langridge née Heley

John Joshua Langridge (1864 – 20 February 1931) was a New Zealand shopkeeper by trade. Born in Temuka, he later lived in Brunner, Tākaka, and then in Ōtāne. He was described of having "possessed of unbounded energy" and got involved in most organisations where he lived, often in a leading manner. He unsuccessfully stood in the 1922 general election for the Liberal Party.

== Career ==
Langridge was born in Temuka in 1864. From age 14, he worked in a general store in his home town. When his employer died, Langridge moved to Brunner (then known as Brunnerton) on the West Coast, where after some time he founded a general store with two business partners. The business did well until the strike at the Brunner Mine, which resulted in the business failing by October 1890 from the resulting local recession. Langridge left Brunner in late 1892, being farewelled at a large function. He was presented with a silver tea and coffee service by the Brunner Rifles, of which he had been captain. The business community, through the mayor of the Brunner Borough, presented a gold ring and a silver-mounted walking stick.

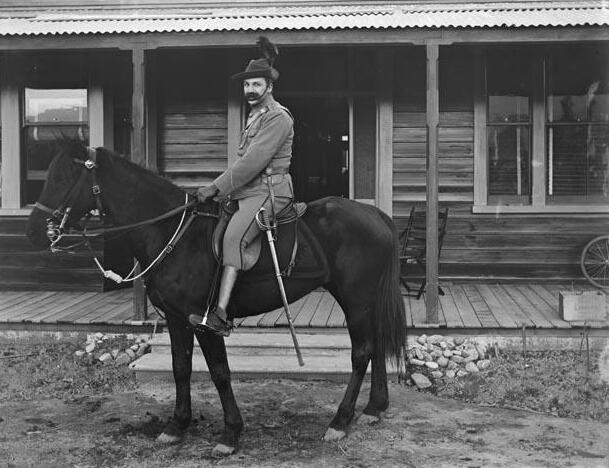
Captain Langridge

Langridge moved to Tākaka in late 1892, with The Colonist giving a favourable report on his reputation in Brunner, and appreciating that another justice of the peace joined the community. He had purchased the store Thomas Allwood Cook. When a county councillor died in April 1893 and it became known that Cook, who was also a county councillor, would leave the district, The Colonist described Langridge as a suitable candidate for one of the positions. However, Langridge did not contest the by-election nor the next regular election.

Langridge suggested to create the Tākaka Pioneers' Memorial and was the driving force behind it. A committee formed in May 1906 to progress the proposal.

Langridge was farewelled from Tākaka in May 1908, with many speakers at the function praising him for his support of many community initiatives. The Colonist described Langridge as being "possessed of unbounded energy and [he] took an active and leading part in almost everything that was going". By then, not enough funds had been collected for the Pioneers' Memorial, and he returned to Tākaka in August 1908 and went from house to house canvassing for memorial funds.

Since November 1909, they lived in Ōtāne.

Langridge was a candidate in the 1922 general election in the Waipawa electorate for the Liberal Party. He was defeated by the incumbent from the Reform Party, George Hunter.

== Private life ==
During 1890, Langridge married Elizabeth "Bessie" Ruth Heley. (Note: They married on 11 March 1890 according to the marriage certificate 1890/538, which is available via Births, Deaths, and Marriages Online.) He died on 20 February 1931 at the Waipukurau Public Hospital. He was survived by his wife and five of their children (one son and four daughters).
