= Tākaka Pioneers' Memorial =

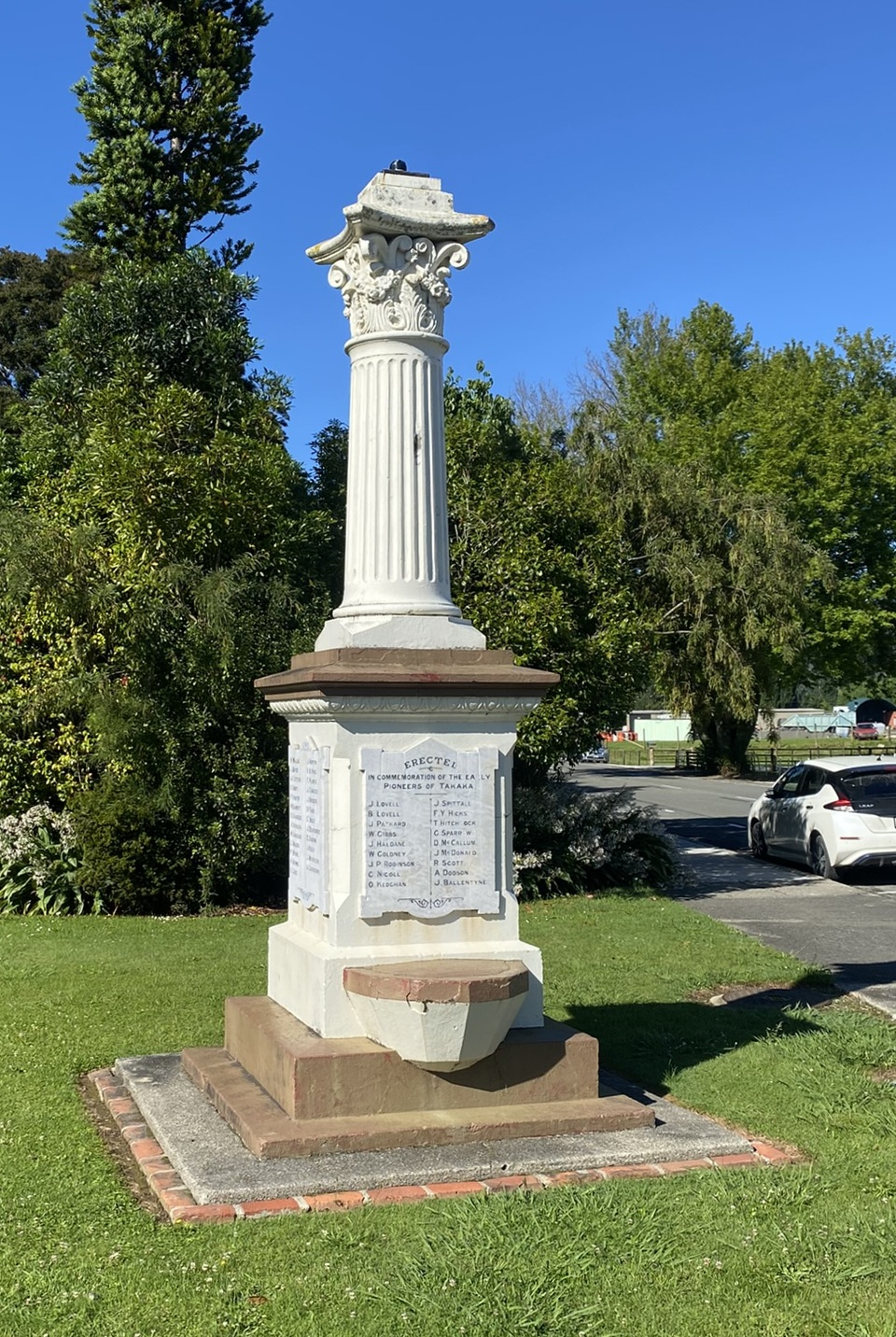
- The monument in 2025
- Interactive map of Tākaka Pioneers' Memorial
- Location: Tākaka, New Zealand
- Coordinates: 40.85736°S 172.8063°E
- Designer: George Miller
- Material: Reinforced concrete with a cement render
- Width: 7 ft (2.1 m)
- Height: 19 ft (5.8 m)
- Weight: 9 tons
- Opening date: 31 March 1909
- Dedicated to: 69 pioneers
- Relocated: 23 February 1984

The Tākaka Pioneers' Memorial is a monument in Tākaka, New Zealand, commemorating 69 early European settlers in the wider area. John Langridge had the idea for the memorial, and was the leading force behind it, probably inspired by a similar memorial from 1897 in his home town Temuka. A memorial committee progressed the idea from May 1906 onwards. The patriarchs of settler families who were in the area by the mid-1860s were eligible to be listed for a subscription. No women are listed, as per the custom of the time, and those who did not pay are also missing. The naming of individual pioneers is an uncommon feature. The original placement of the memorial opposite to the Telegraph Hotel is believed to have provided Tākaka's first street light through a gas lamp mounted at the top of the memorial. The top of the memorial has changed numerous times mostly due to vandalism; the original ornate gas lamp was replaced by an ornate globe, later replaced with a town clock, an ornate lamp based on the original, and then a plain globe. For many years, the top of the monument has been left empty. Including the lamp, the memorial is 5.8 m (19 ft) high. The memorial used to have a water trough which has since been filled in.

The Tākaka Pioneers' Memorial was unveiled on 31 March 1909. Much to the surprise of the community, the monument was relocated in 1984 to what is now known as Memorial Park. As of 2026, there is a proposal for a museum for the Anaweka waka under discussion that would see the memorial relocated once again.

== History ==
=== First location ===
The wider Tākaka area was first settled by Pākehā in 1842, when Ann Lovell and her husband James moved to Motupipi. (Note: Māori first settled in New Zealand from the late 1200s. According to the Golden Bay Museum, Golden Bay was settled around 1300.) John Langridge (Note: Langridge had first come to Tākaka in 1892, i.e. he was a relative newcomer compared to other committee members.) first suggested that a memorial for the early settlers of Tākaka be erected and he led the proposal, and a committee formed on 9 May 1906 to progress the proposal. The initial committee included John Langridge, John Rose, Maurice Hunter, William Charles Baigent, James Packard, John William Moulder (secretary), James Page, Owen Keoghan, Alex Haldane, Samuel Fittall, Robert Cann, and Ray Bensemann. Langridge later became secretary of the committee and Rose took on the chairmanship. Ken Wright of the Nelson Historical Society, who has written a history about the memorial, estimates that the cut-off for inclusion on the memorial was the mid-1860s. From his research, he concluded that a subscription had to be paid before a name was to be included, as many settlers who moved to the district before the mid-1860s are not included. Only men are named, and where more than one generation was present, only the patriarch is listed.

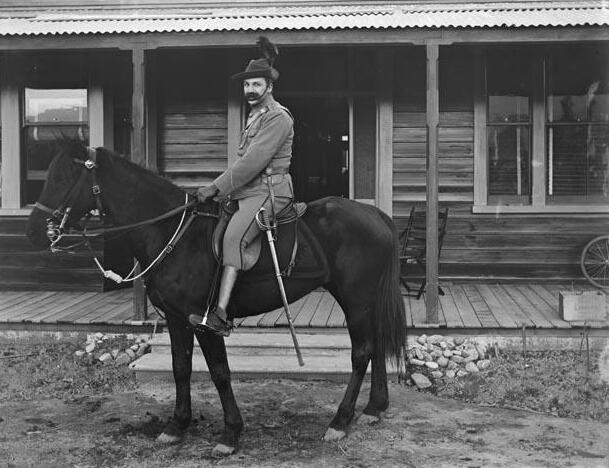
Langridge in his captain's uniform

The committee raised funding via subscriptions, with Langridge taking a leading role. He was farewelled from Tākaka in May 1908, with many speakers at the function praising him for his support of many community initiatives. By then, not enough funds had been collected for the Pioneers' Memorial, and he returned to Tākaka in August 1908 and went from house to house canvassing for memorial funds. Once sufficient funds had been pledged, the subscribers were given the choice of the form and site of the memorial. In September 1908, the committee requested that Takaka County purchase some land at the junction of Commercial Street, Motupipi Street, and Willow Street and make it available for the monument, to which the county councillors agreed in a majority vote. The subscribers met in early December 1908 and agreed on the form of the memorial to a design by George Miller.

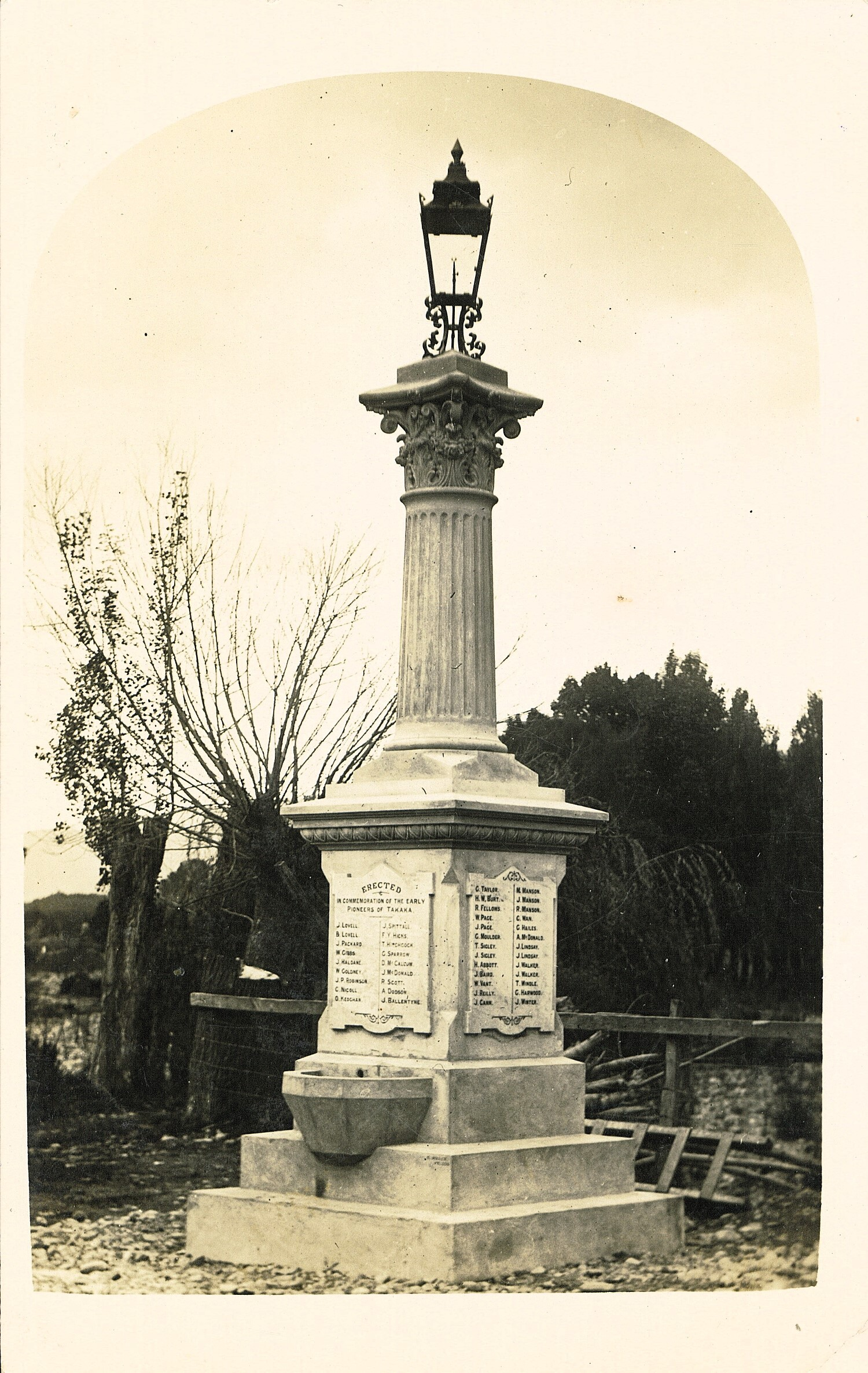
The Tākaka Pioneers' Memorial in its original location with its ornamental lamp

The monument was unveiled on the afternoon of 31 March 1909, with attendance compromised by rain and unsettled weather. As Langridge was absent, the unveiling was done by the chair of the county council, William James Reilly. (Note: The source gives W. J. Reilly as the name, but his full name was William James Reilly as shown in his obituary.) A parade was held, with the brass band ahead of the old settlers, which were led by Joseph Packard (Note: Packard's son James was on the organising committee.) as the oldest resident, (Note: Joseph Packard was born in July 1825, i.e. he was 83 at the unveiling.) followed by the high school cadets. John Rose, as chairman of the organising committee, was master of ceremonies. Speeches were given by the three ministers of the Tākaka churches and some of the early settlers. Afterwards, refreshments were had at Haase's hotel opposite.

In a 1942 photo, the original ornamental lamp had been changed to a white glass globe. This was replaced in September 1977 with a town clock, as initiated by councillor Pat Reilly, fully subscribed by descendants of the original pioneers. After that clock was vandalised beyond repair, it was replaced by an ornamental lamp similar to the 1909 lamp.

=== Second location ===
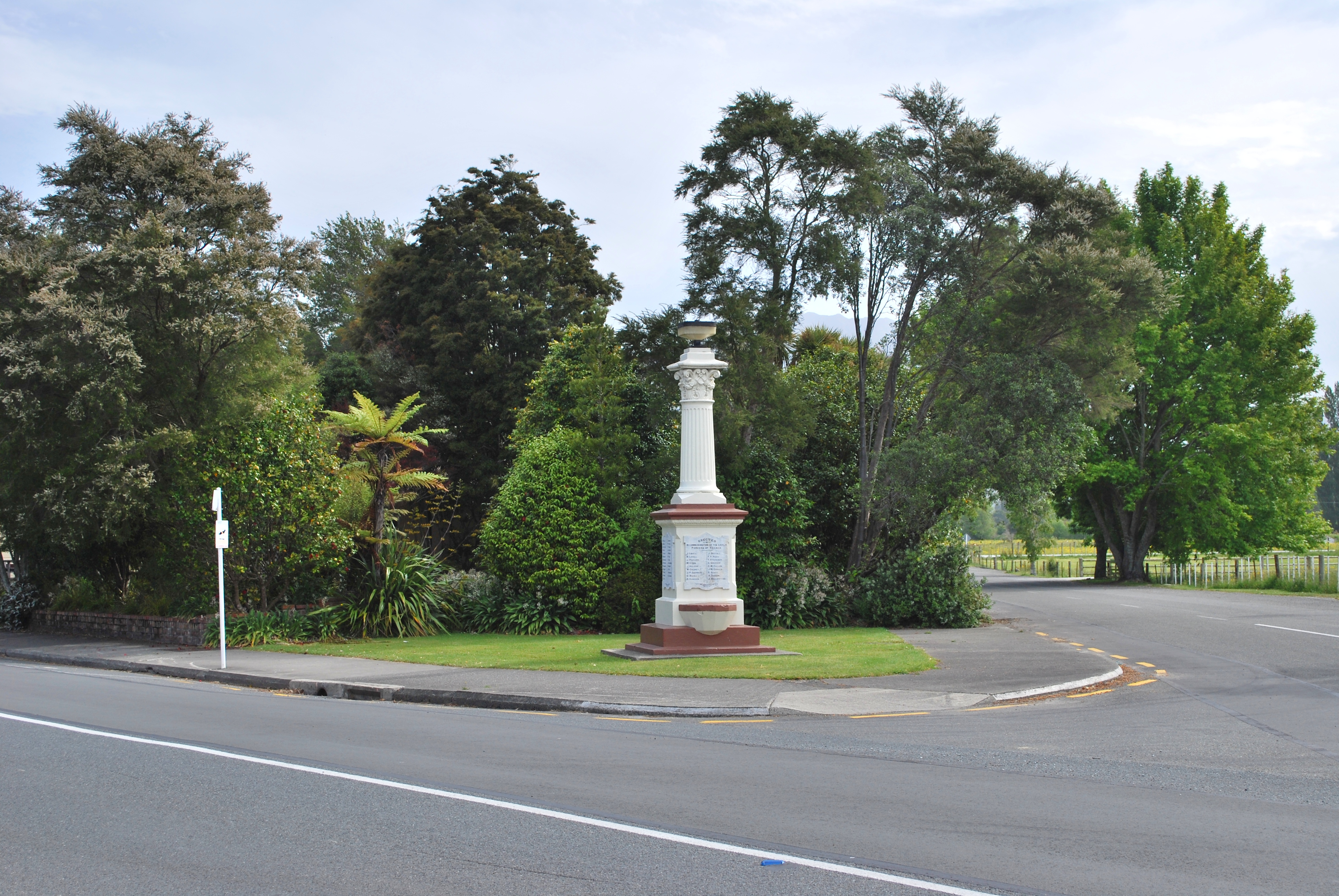
The memorial in 2011 still with a light mounted at the top

It was councillor Bob Taylor who suggested during the 15 February 1984 county council meeting that the monument be moved to make room for a proposed road at the original location – a road that was never built. Taylor moved the motion, and Pat Reilly seconded it, and the proposal passed. Only eight days later, on 23 February, the memorial was moved to its new location. An area around and underneath the base was excavated, the 9-tonne memorial lifted onto a truck, driven down Commercial Street, and lifted into its new location at the corner with Reilly Street. The plan for the relocation was unknown to the public, as the action caused public concern, with the county clerk receiving 30 calls with complaints about the action.

The monument was once again vandalised in December 1988, with the globe smashed, some damage to the structure, and lead letters pulled out. The ornate globe was replaced with a plain version. Half the lead lettering was replaced in June 1996, a renovation that took about 100 hours and paid for by Tasman District Council. Further letter repairs were carried out in late 2006.

In June 2026, Tasman District Council (TDC) started consultation on whether using Pioneer Park, which holds the monument, for a new museum building to house the Anaweka waka. If the museum goes ahead, the monument would have to be relocated. Pioneer Park is held by the council as a reserve with a designation for a museum. Local iwi are driving the museum proposal and their spokesperson stated that the project would only go ahead if TDC leased Pioneer Park to them.

== Description ==
Tākaka
Location history:
1 Junction corner
2 Pioneer Park

The memorial was designed by George Miller (1872–1949), a monumental sculptor based in Hardy Street in Nelson. The structure is made of reinforced concrete with a cement render as a finish. There are three square bases of reducing sizes, with the bottom base 2.1 m (7 ft) wide. The monument is 5.8 m (19 ft) high. A trough was attached to the top base, and this was variously described as a drinking fountain or a horse drinking trough. Either way, the trough has since been filled in. A manual pump provided by the county council used to supply the water to the trough. The dado or die holds the panels with the settlers' names. Above is a fluted column. On top of the capital of Corinthian order was initially a decorated lamp. The initial placement of the monument was at what was then known as Junction corner, i.e. the intersection of Commercial, Motupipi and Willow Streets. Moulder, as secretary, had stated that the monument would provide some lighting along those streets and it appears that at the unveiling in 1909, there was little (if any) other street lighting in Tākaka. The gas was supplied free of charge by Otto Haase from his hotel—the Telegraph Hotel—on the opposite side of the intersection; Haase would also light the lamp every night. (Note: Haase had taken over the Telegraph Hotel in 1902 and during his proprietorship, the venue was also known as Haase's Hotel.)

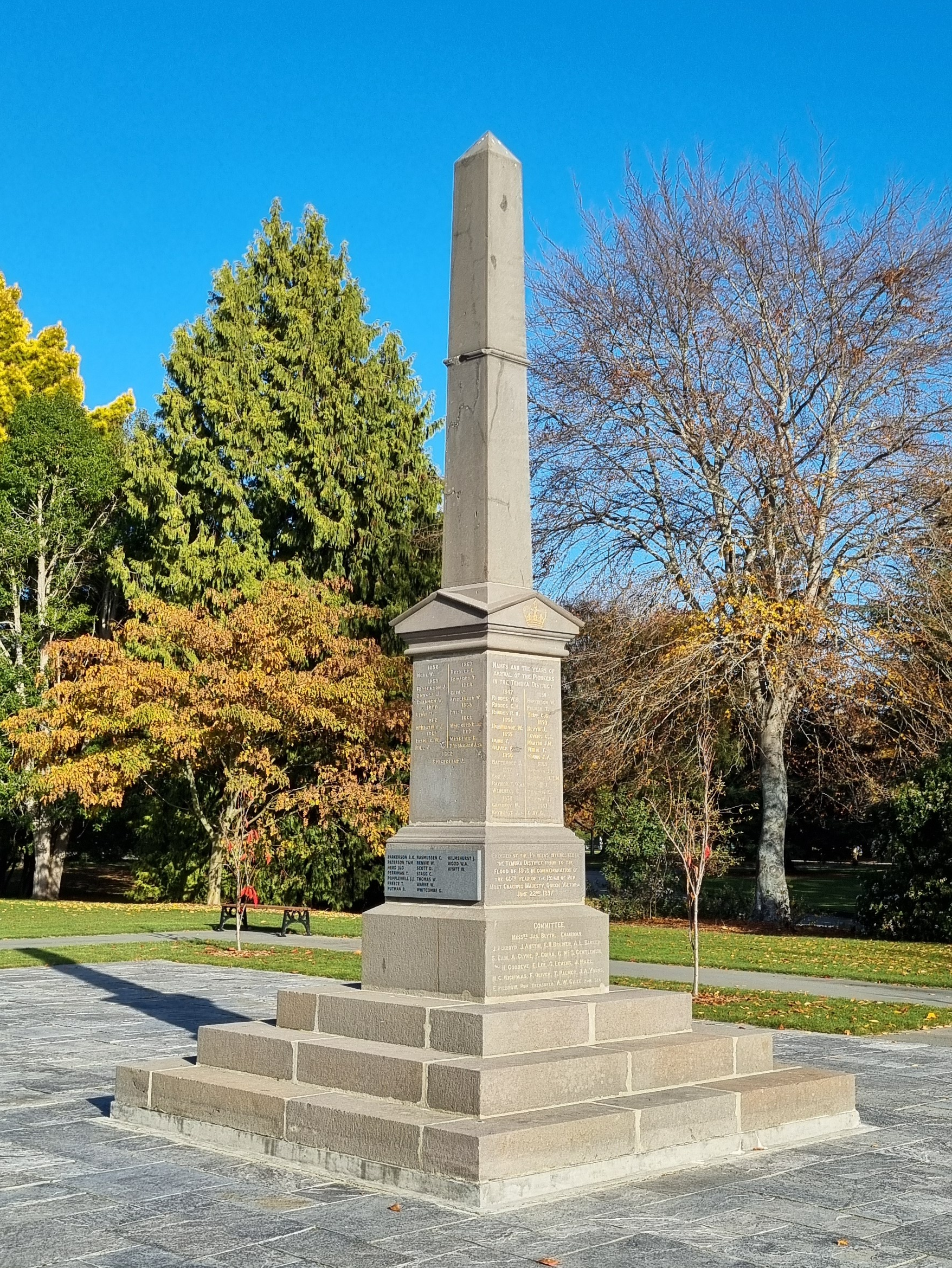
The Temuka Pioneers' Memorial is thought to have been Langridge's inspiration for the Tākaka monument.

Unlike other settlers' memorials that display a general statement about early pioneers, this one is unusual for listing 69 individual names. There are three marble tablets, with the names of the settlers inset and leaded. The central panel has the heading "Erected in commemoration of the Early Pioneers of Takaka", and the three earliest settlers from Motupipi are the first three names on that panel, acknowledging that European settlement started with them. In the mid-2000s, there was discussion whether to add an additional plaque to the memorial with the missing pioneer settlers, but this did not happen.

The monument is not heritage-registered by either TDC or by Heritage New Zealand.

According to Ken Wright's research, the project was inspired by the settlers' memorial unveiled in Langridge's home town Temuka in December 1897. The Temuka memorial has a similar shape and also contains the unusual feature of listing the individual settlers, who paid one guinea to have their name included. The cut off for inclusion was settlement prior to the Temuka flood of February 1868.

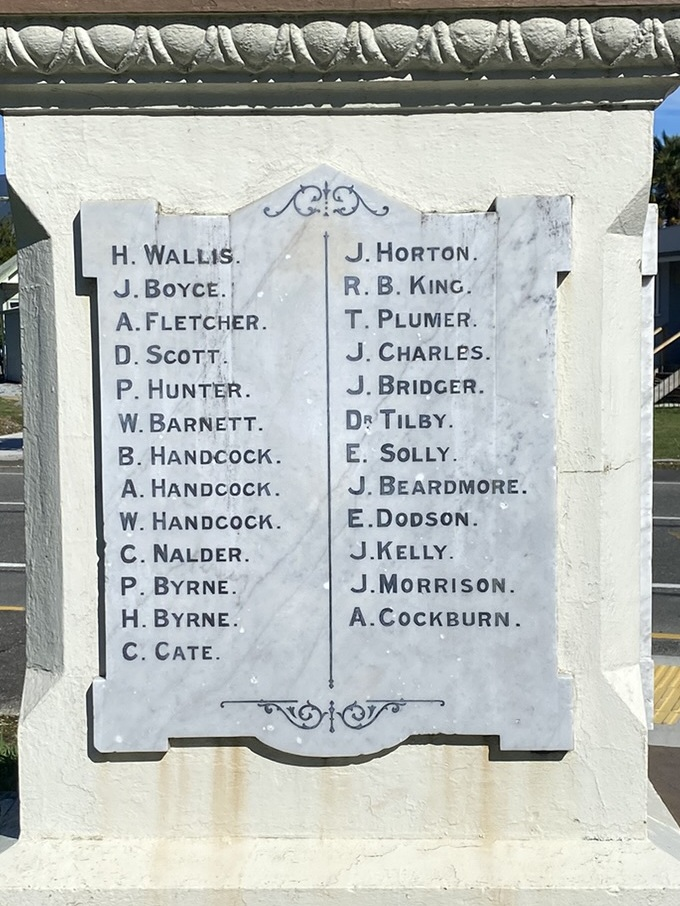
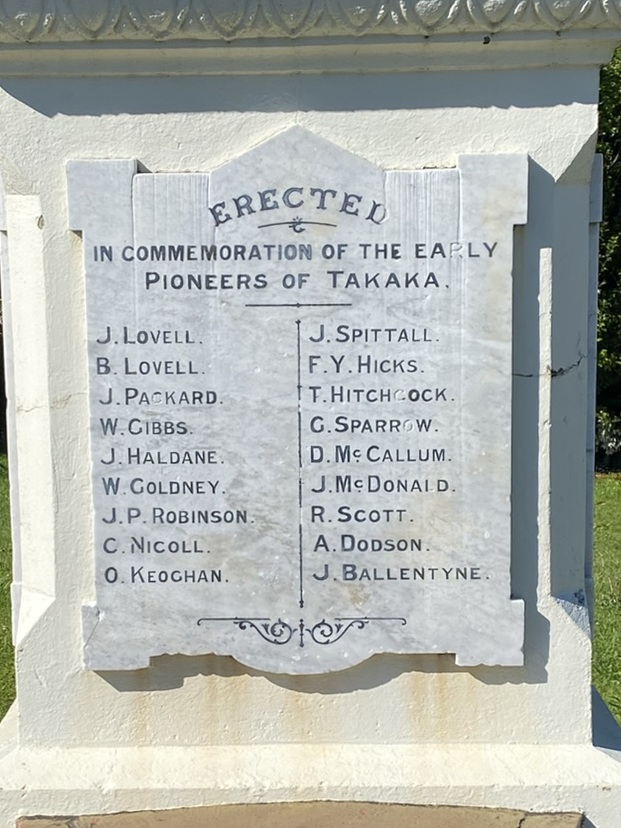
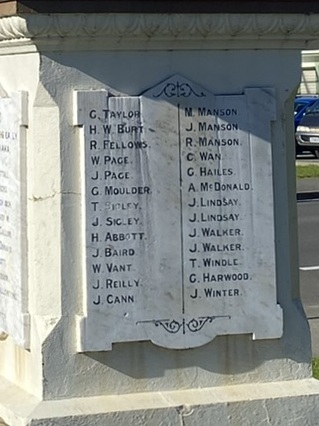
The panels (left, centre, right) with the inscribed names
