= Waka (canoe) =

Māori watercraft, usually canoes

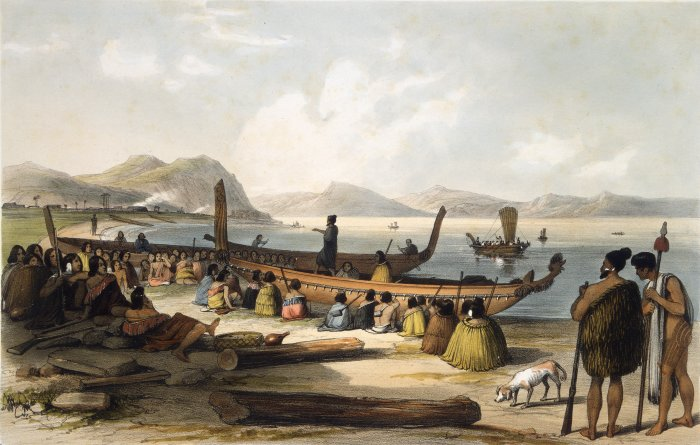
Waka taua (war canoes) at the Bay of Islands, 1827–1828

Waka (Māori: [ˈwaka]) are Māori watercraft, usually canoes ranging in size from small, unornamented canoes (waka tīwai) used for fishing and river travel to large, decorated war canoes (waka taua) up to 40 metres (130 ft) long.

The earliest remains of a canoe in New Zealand were found near the Anaweka estuary in a remote part of the Tasman District and radiocarbon-dated to about 1400. The canoe was constructed in New Zealand, and was a sophisticated canoe, compatible with the style of other Polynesian voyaging canoes at that time.

Since the 1970s, about eight large double-hulled waka of about 20 metres have been constructed for oceanic voyaging to other parts of the Pacific. They are made of a blend of modern and traditional materials, incorporating features from ancient Melanesia, as well as Polynesia.

== Waka taua (war canoes) ==
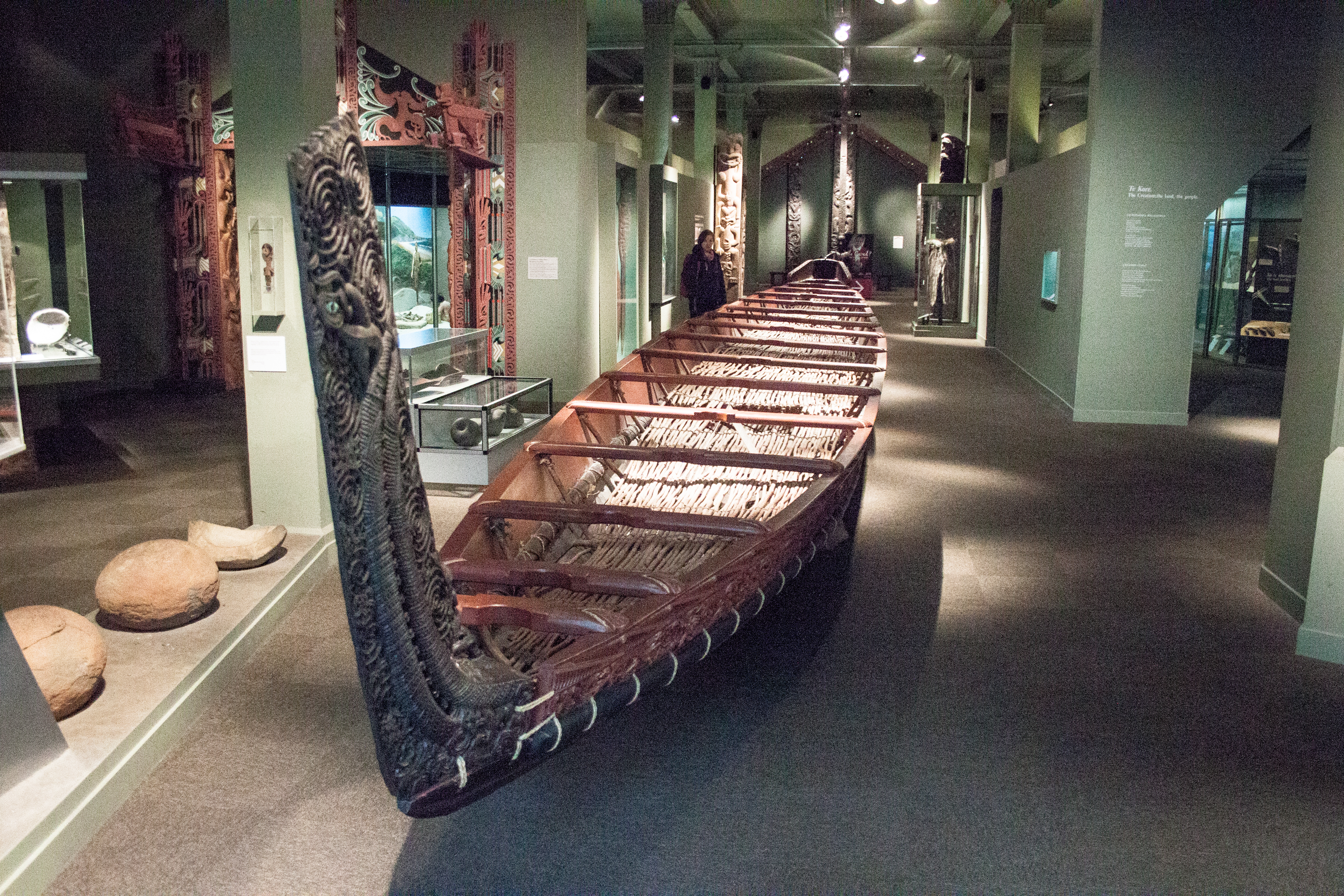
A waka taua on display at the Otago Museum in Dunedin

Waka taua (in Māori, waka means "canoe" and taua means "army" or "war party") are large canoes manned by up to 80 paddlers and are up to 40 metres (130 ft) in length. Large waka, such as Ngā Toki Matawhaorua, which are usually elaborately carved and decorated, consist of a main hull formed from a single hollowed-out log, along with a carved upright head and tailboard. The gunwale is raised in some by a continuous plank, which gives increased freeboard and prevents distortion of the main hull components when used in a rough seas. Sometimes the hull is further strengthened, as in the case of Te Winika, a 200-year-old design, by a batten or stringer running lengthwise both inside and outside the hull just above the loaded waterline. The resurgence of Māori culture has seen an increase in the numbers of waka taua built, generally on behalf of a tribal group, for use on ceremonial occasions.

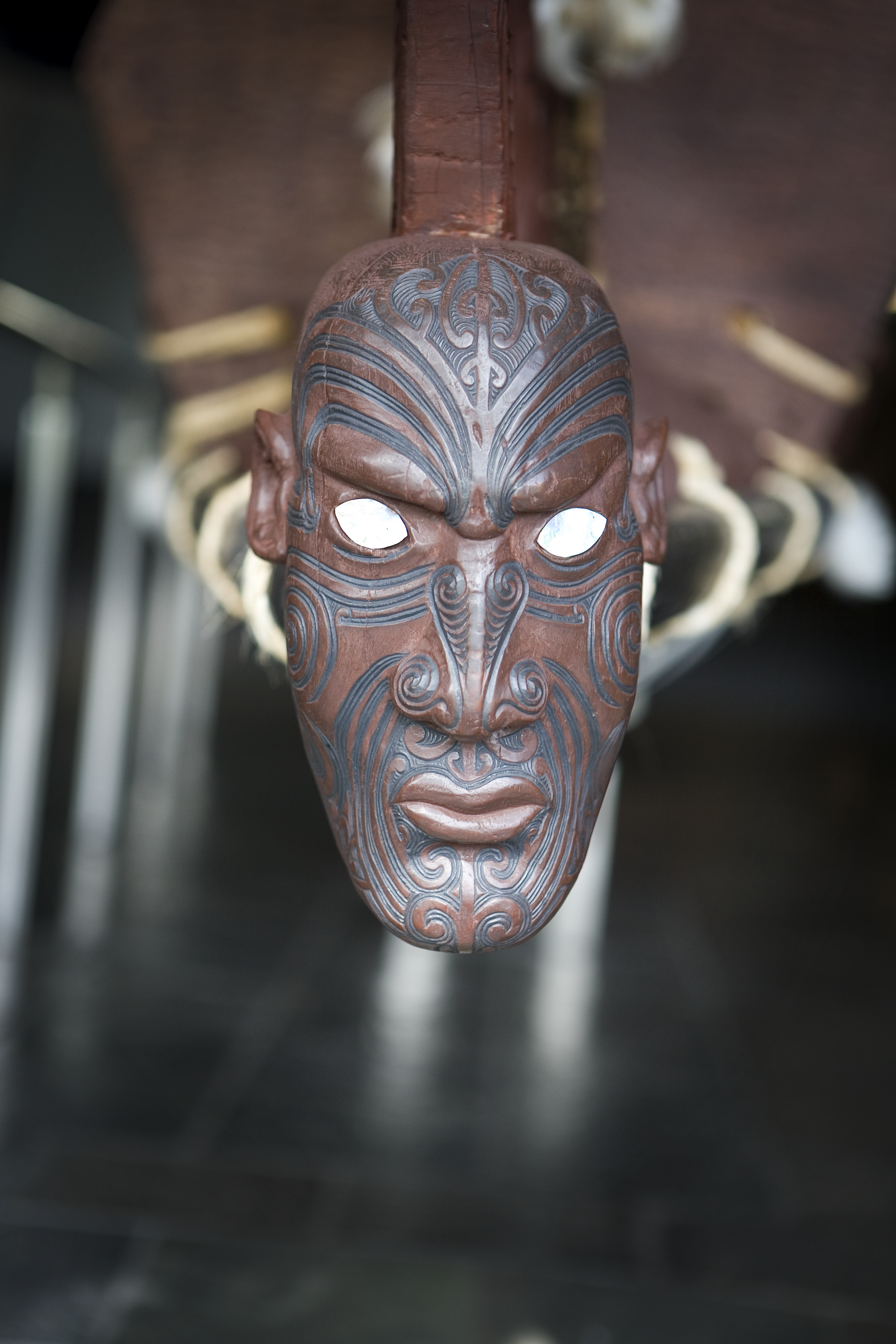
Detailed kanohi (face) on the front of the waka taua Te Winika, on display at Te Whare Taonga o Waikato Museum & Gallery

Traditionally the war canoe was highly tapu (sacred). No cooked food was allowed in the craft and the waka had to be entered over the gunwales, not the bow or stern, which were highly decorated with powerful symbols. Waka were often painted with black or white with black representing death. The main colour was red, using paint made from kōkōwai (red ochre), which stood for tapu. Sometimes a waka would be placed upright as a marker for a dead chief with the curved bottom of the hull carved. Māori told missionaries during the Musket Wars that battles between waka took place at sea with the aim being to ram an enemy's waka amidships at high speed. The ramming vessel would ride up over the gunwale and either force it under water or cause it to roll over. This description matches the attack on the ship's boat of Abel Tasman in Golden Bay in 1642 when a Māori catamaran rammed a cockboat and four Dutch sailors were killed.

=== Traditional construction ===
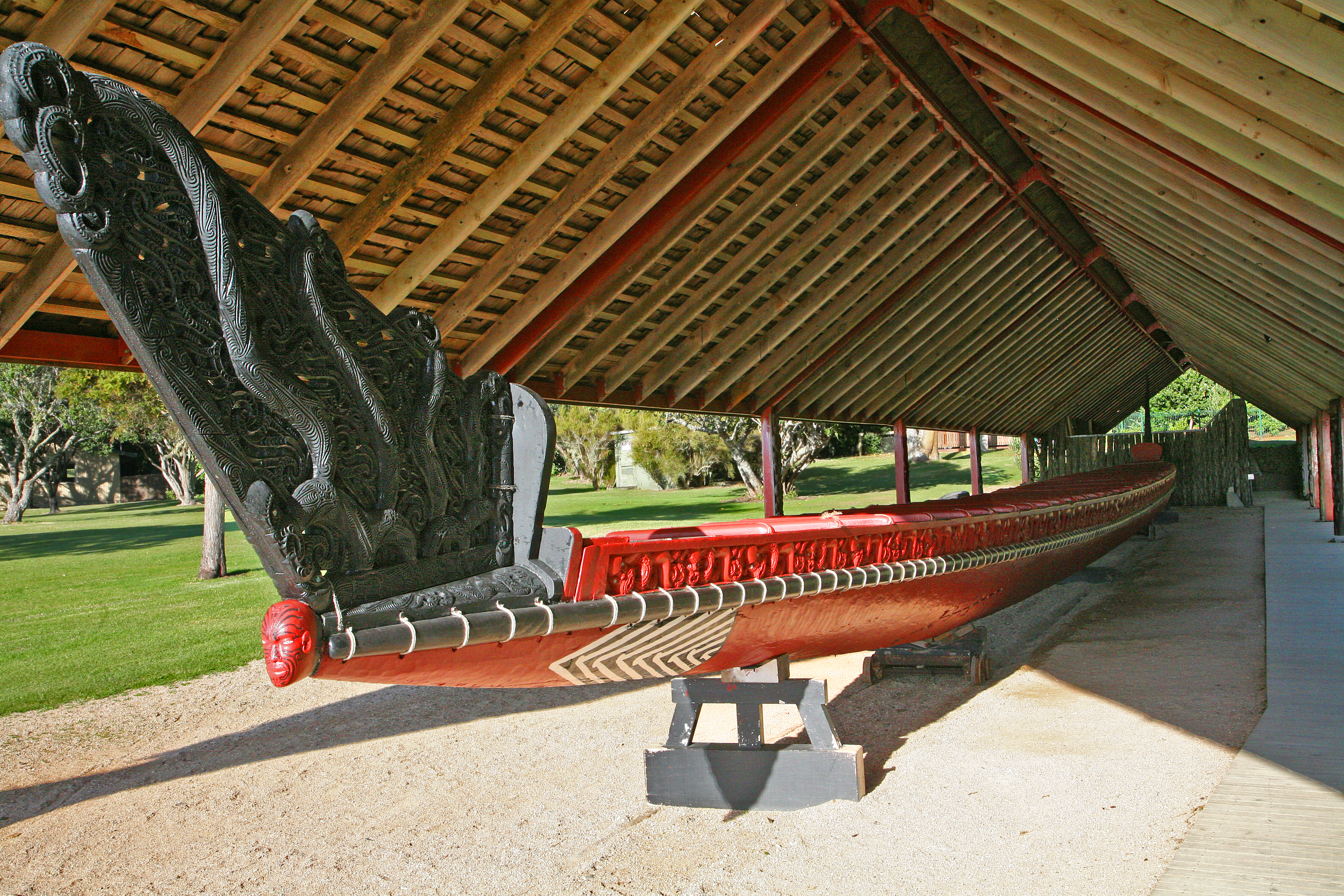
Traditional waka at Waitangi Treaty House site

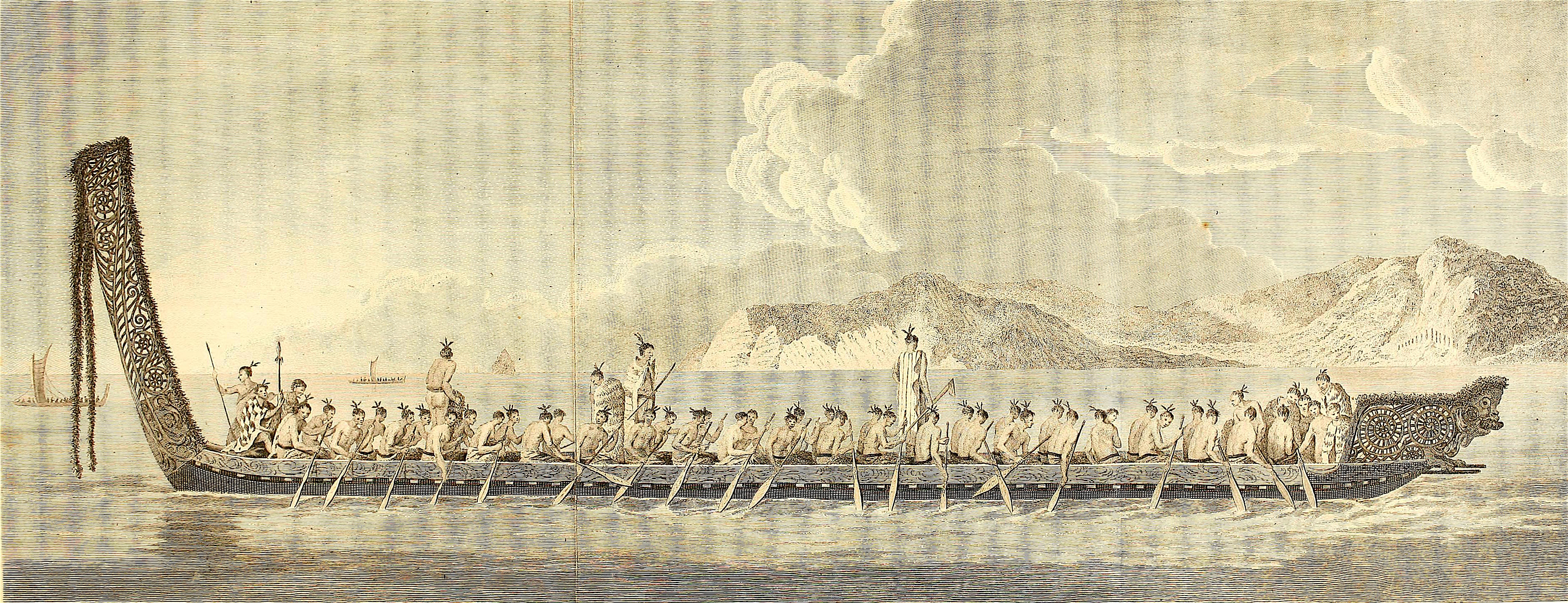
Drawing of a traditional waka, 1773

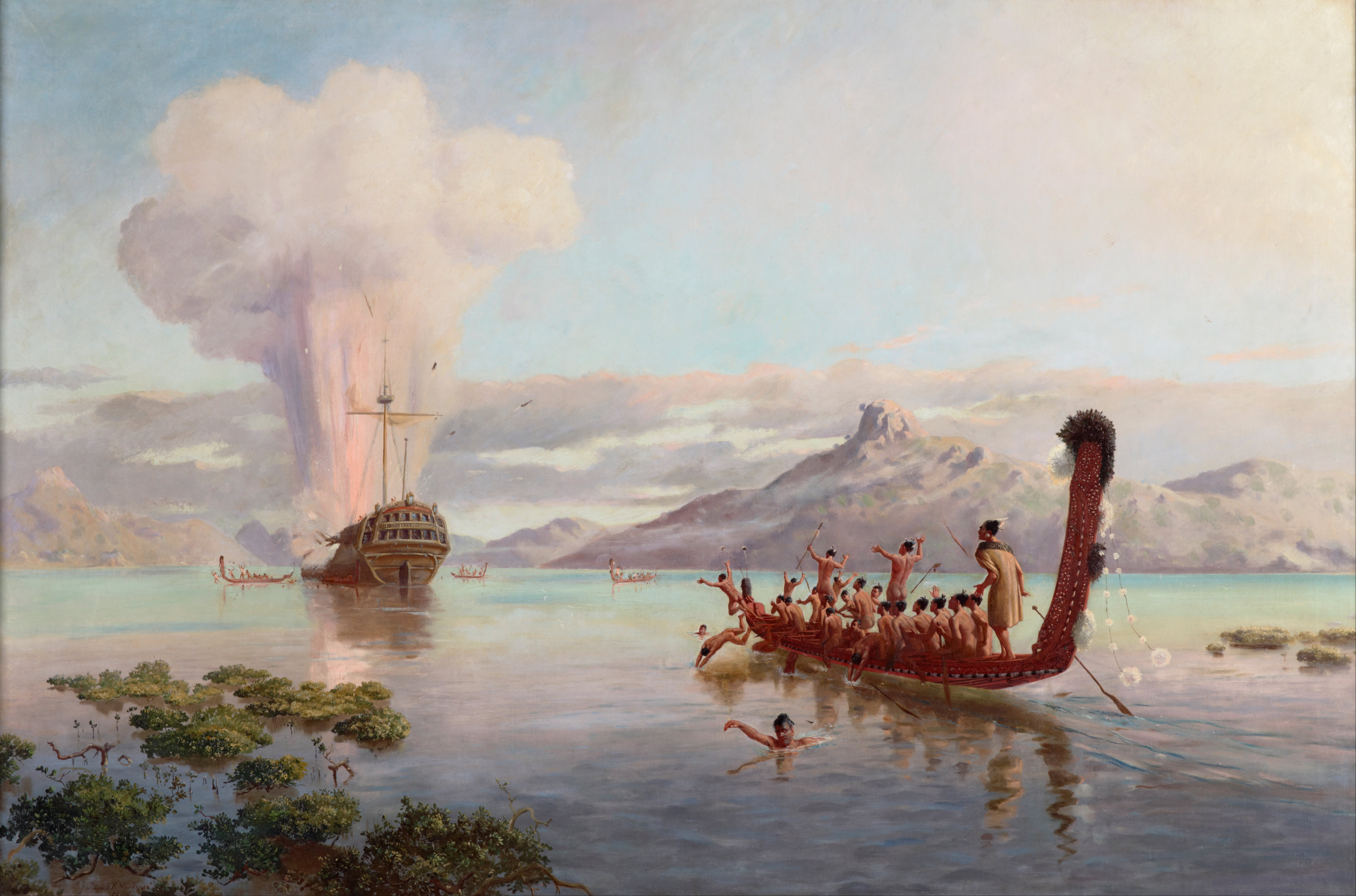
Waka at the blowing up of the Boyd, painting by Louis John Steele (1889)

During the classic period (about 1500 to 1770) a hapū would select a tōtara tree and prepare it years ahead for felling. Tōtara is a lightweight wood with a high natural oil content that helps prevent rot. This would include the removal of bark from one side of the trunk and the clearing of the ground and the planting of food crops for workers. After a karakia, the tree would be felled by a combination of fires around the base and chopping with toki (hand adzes). On an especially large tree with aerial roots a stage about 3 m high was built of wood. On this was built a framework on which was suspended a giant upside-down toki (axe), about 2.5 m long. The long axis of the toki was tied to the crossmember of the upper framework so that it could pivot back and forth, like a swing. Heavy rocks were tied to each side of the long axis at its lowest point to give momentum. The toki was pulled back and released so that the cutting edge bit into the wood that was weakened by fire. It could take two to three weeks to cut down a large tree in this manner.

Once felled, the head of the tree and branches were removed, then the hull was roughly shaped in situ, using fire and hand adzes, under the guidance of the chief designer. A stone toki was used by relatively gentle, but regular and repeated blows. The head was soaked in water to make the binding swell and hold the stone blade more firmly. Once the shaping was complete, the log of 3–4 tonnes was pulled by teams of men to a stream or river, using multiple ropes made from raupō (bulrush). Some men pulled the waka forward while others restrained it on downhill slopes. Accidents at this stage were apparently common. Saplings were used as skids and rollers over uneven ground.

The final shaping was done closer to the papakāinga (home base) to be nearer to food. A waka could take a year to make if the construction went smoothly, but it could be abandoned if there was an accident or a death of an important person. Such abandoned, uncompleted waka have been found in post-contact times. Most large waka were built in several main interlocking sections and stitched together with flax rope. Small pegs were put into the holes, which swelled and sealed when wet. Tree gum could also seal the holes. A large finished waka weighed about three tonnes and could remain in use for many decades. All large waka had names and were objects of pride and admiration.

The image above shows a waka taua with unusually high freeboard. A noticeable feature of a loaded waka taua was its very low freeboard of 400–500 mm, which made the vessel unseaworthy in all but good weather, despite the presence of one or two young men on board dedicated to bailing. The normal timber used, tōtara, is a lightweight native podocarp, which retains its natural oils even when cut down. This prevented the timber opening up and splitting. Angela Ballara noted that they only put to sea when it was fine. One voyage across the stormy Cook Strait was delayed for a week while the travellers waited for fine weather. The missionary William Williams, son of Henry Williams, noted that the voyage of a waka taua was a leisurely affair due to the requirements of foraging for food and waiting for fine weather.

The 18-month construction of Tāhere Tikitiki, a waka taua, in the early 1970s was recorded in the 1974 National Film Unit documentary Tāhere Tikitiki – The Making of a Māori Canoe directed by David Sims, providing a visual insight into the building of a waka. The canoe was commissioned by the Māori Queen, Te Arikinui Dame Te Atairangikaahu, and constructed at Tūrangawaewae Marae by master carver Piri Poutapu.

=== Traditional sails ===
Tasman noted that two of the waka which attacked his ships in Golden Bay in today's Tasman District in December 1642, had a sail that Tasman referred to as a Tingang sail—a small triangular sail often temporarily hoisted. Later, early Europeans from the 1830s onwards gave detailed descriptions of the use, appearance and materials used in Māori sails. Although there were regional variations within New Zealand, most sails were temporary and could be hoisted or struck in a few minutes. The roughly triangular sail, usually made from either flax, tī leaves or raupō or a combination, was set about one-third back from the bow. The raupō sail was much lighter. The mast and yard spars were small diameter, with the yard being thinner, about 5 metres (16 ft) high, long, and permanently attached to the sail so the rig was raised as a single unit. Loops were woven into both the luff and the leech of the sail for attachment to the spars. Tānekaha branches were favoured, as the tree was common as far south as Nelson. It was a straight, strong and flexible wood. An added advantage may have been that the wood bled red tannin, a colour strongly favoured by Māori.

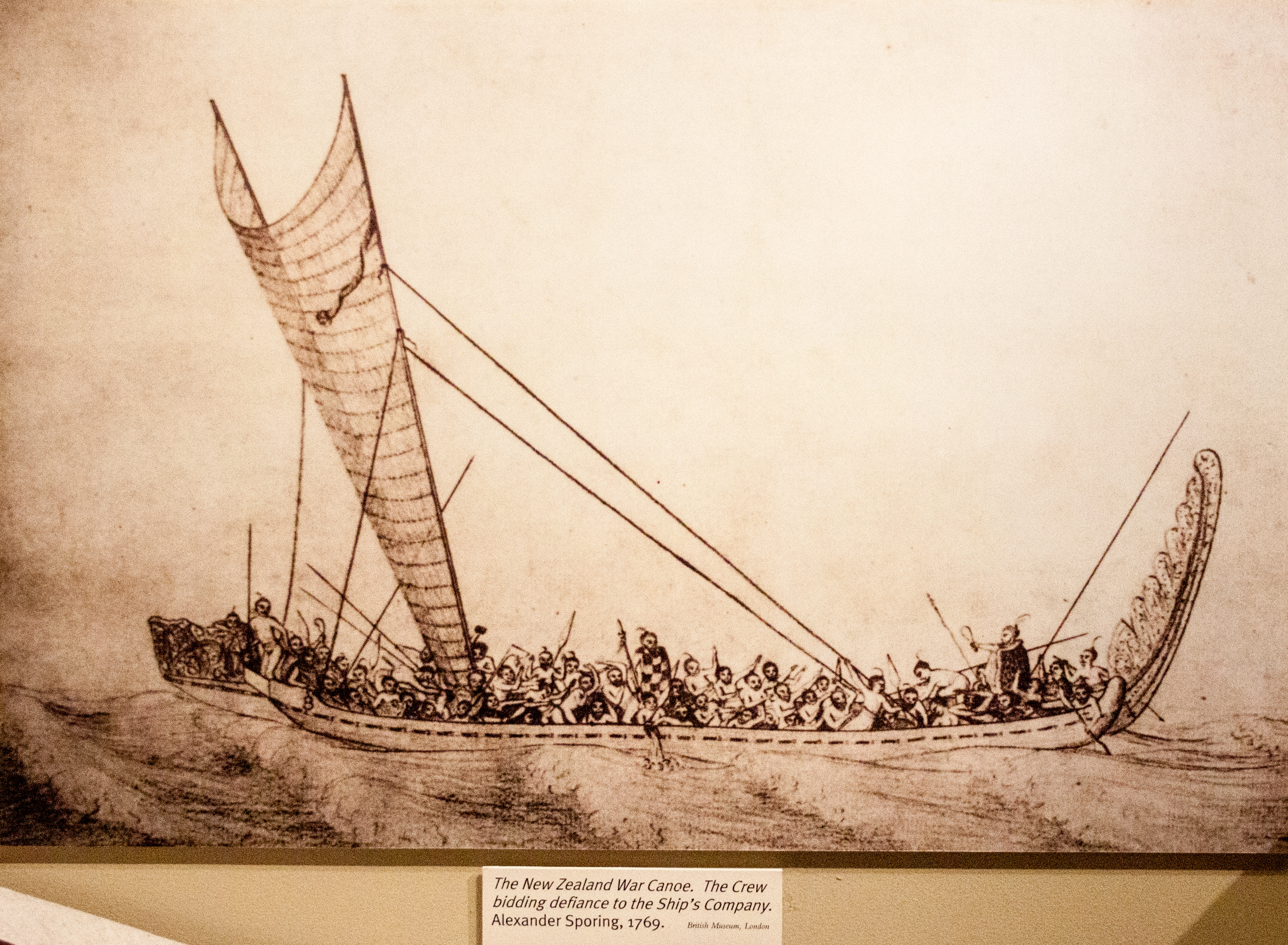
Māori waka with triangle sail drawn by Herman Spöring during Cook's first voyage to New Zealand in 1769

The head of the triangle sail was the shortest—about 2 metres (6.6 ft)—and often decorated with tufts of feathers that may have served as wind indicators. The mast was held in place by a forestay, a backstay and two side stays. The sheet to control the sail angle led from the top of the yard directly to the sheet handler, although early British sailors were critical of the sheet being tied off. The sail was only used downwind, as the waka lacked a keel or centre-board to prevent leeway, therefore preventing windward sailing. Rarely, two sails of the same size, were used in larger waka.

Due to its slim hull the waka could sail at considerable speed down wind. When struck, the sail was wrapped around the two spars and laid along the centre of the waka thwarts, between the paddlers. Sometimes a pattern was woven into the sail, using a different material. The only known example of a traditional waka sail is in the British Museum. Capsizes were not unknown, with the hull being tipped to get rid of water, then bailed out. This type of triangular sail, with straight mast and high angled sprit, is identical to that used in the Marquesan Islands. Although there are references to the use of the Society Island–type crescent-shaped sail in New Zealand, these appear to have been rare and no examples exist.

== Technology changes ==
From the arrival of James Cook in 1769 and especially Marion Du Fresne's longer stay in New Zealand in 1772, Māori obtained iron and steel, which they did not previously have. Māori quickly adopted this material, especially for carving. Māori learnt to ask sailors to sharpen 8-inch-long (20 cm) ships' nails to a chisel point on a ship's wheel in exchange for fish. This period between 1779 and 1820 has been called the golden age of Māori wood carving. Much of the carving was on waka taua.

During the middle 19th century, from 1835, the arrival of large numbers of European settlers and ships – a hundred ships visited the Bay of Islands in 1839 – meant that ship's boats were far more commonly available and were increasingly used by Māori in preference to waka. This was a trend that missionaries such as Marsden and Williams noted as beginning in the 1830s. The beamier and lighter ship's boat was a better load carrier with more stability and was sometimes equipped with sails for windward sailing. Use of ship's boats became common, as many Māori worked on a wide variety of sealing, whaling and trading sailing vessels, both in New Zealand and in the Pacific.

Few waka were used for movement of warriors during the Land Wars. When the Invasion of the Waikato started in 1863, the government forces made a point of sinking all the waka they could find on the Waikato River and its tributaries to slow rebel communication. Some examples of these were later placed in the Auckland War Memorial Museum.

== Ocean-going canoes ==
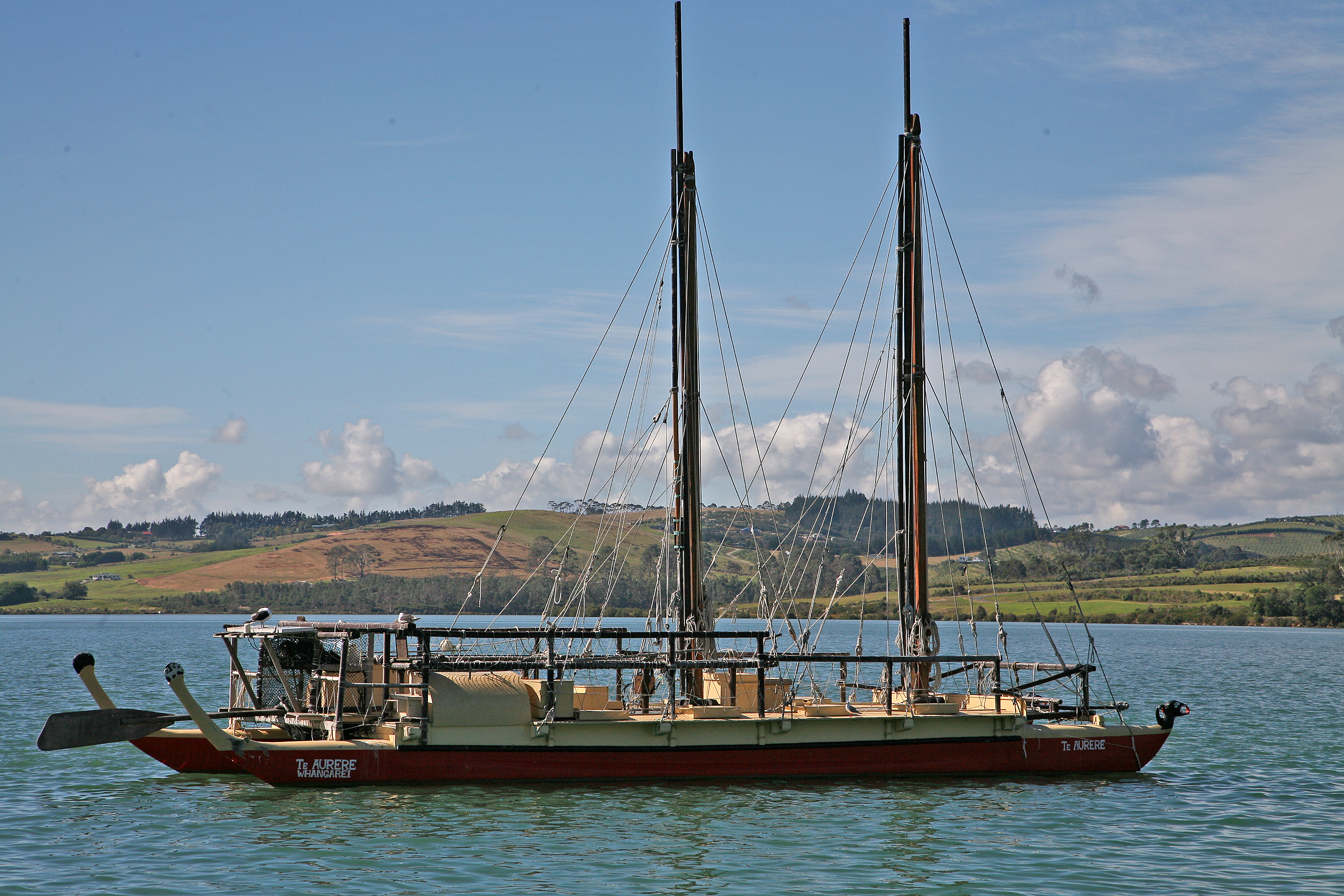
Te Aurere, a reconstructed waka hourua, in Mangonui in 2009

Ocean-going waka, whatever their size, could be paddled, but achieved their best speeds when propelled by sail. The Polynesian settlers of New Zealand migrated to New Zealand in large waka; according to legend, some of these were possibly waka hourua, double-hulled vessels. The names and stories associated with those waka were passed on in oral history, but dates, names, times, and routes were frequently muddled as the descendants of the settlers multiplied and separated into iwi (tribes) and hapū (sub-tribes). The word waka has come to refer to an association of iwi descended from the crew of one of the migratory canoes.

In 1992, Hekenukumai Busby built Te Aurere, a waka hourua, using traditional methods and materials. It has voyaged across the Pacific, to Hawaii, Tahiti, the Marquesas, New Caledonia and Norfolk Island, as well as repeatedly circumnavigating the North Island using Polynesian navigation methods. The Anaweka waka, discovered in 2012 at Anaweka estuary on the northwestern coast of the South Island, is a hull section portion of what is likely to have been an ocean-going waka.

== Waka ama (outrigger canoes) ==
Early European explorers saw Māori using waka ama (outrigger canoes). "Sydney Parkinson, an artist on Captain James Cook's first voyage to New Zealand in 1769, and the German scientist Johann Reinhold Forster, who sailed with Cook in 1773, described waka fitted with outriggers (ama, amatiatia or kōrewa)". Already rare in Cook's time, waka ama had largely faded from memory by the early 19th century. However, the term waka ama occurs in old stories, such as the story of Māui published by Grey in 1854 and in a few old waiata; Tregear also mentions the waka ama as "a possession of the Māori", adding that "It was beneath the outrigger of such a canoe that the famous Maui crushed his wife's brother Irawaru before turning him into a dog. Both the double canoe and the outrigger have entirely disappeared from among the Māoris, and it is doubtful if any native now alive has seen either of them in New Zealand".

Two outrigger floats were found in swamps along the Horowhenua coast of Cook Strait, and another float was found in Moncks Cave near Christchurch. All three floats were short, suggesting that Māori outriggers were small and used only in sheltered waters.

The Māori words for the parts of the outrigger, such as ama and kīato, recorded in the early years of European settlement, suggest that Māori outrigger canoes were similar in form to those known from central Polynesia.

Since the 1990s, waka ama racing, introduced from Pacific nations into New Zealand during the 1980s and 1990s, using high-tech canoes of Hawaiian or Tahitian design,has become an increasingly popular sport among Māori, often performed as part of cultural festivals held in summer.

== Other materials used ==
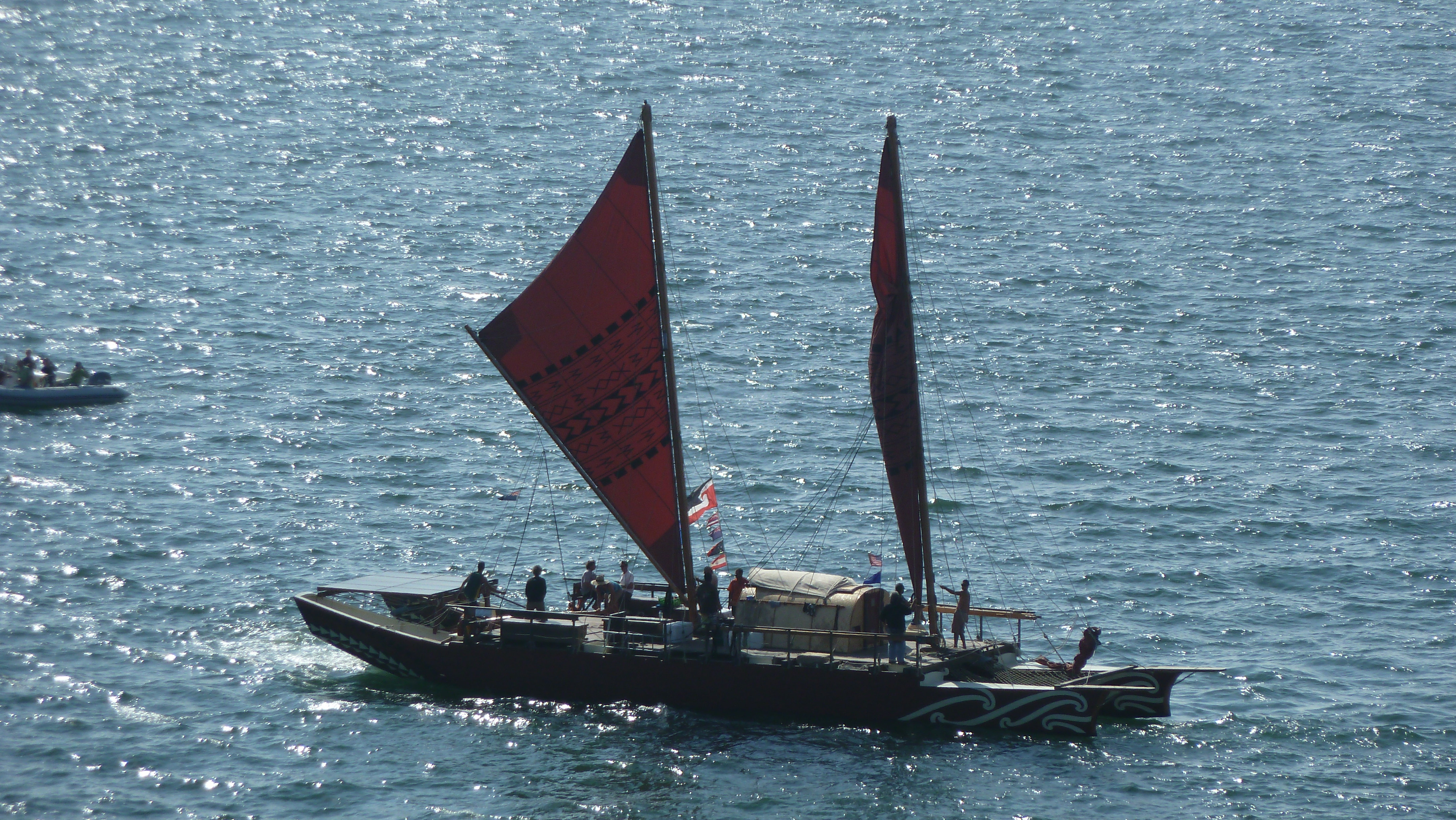
Haunui, a replica ocean-going waka

Some waka, particularly in the Chatham Islands, were not conventional canoes, but were constructed from raupō or flax stalks.

In 2009, the Okeanos Foundation for the Sea and Salthouse Boatbuilders built a fleet of vaka moana or waka hourua with fibreglass hulls. One of these, Haunui, was gifted to the Te Toki Voyaging Trust in New Zealand.

Te Tuhono, a waka taua in the National Museum of Scotland, was restored and partially reconstructed by the Māori craftsman George Nuku, using carved poly(methyl methacrylate) (PMMA) to recreate missing sections.

== Related meanings ==
The word "waka" is also used in broader senses that can be translated as "vessel", "container", or "vehicle".

A waka huia is a hollowed and carved vessel used for storing of taonga (treasures) such as the prized tail feathers of the now extinct huia (Heteralocha acutirostris) that are worn as ornaments in the hair.

In current Māori language usage, waka is used to refer to cars (along with the transliterated term motokā), as well as other transportation modes such as waka rererangi for aircraft and a waka ātea for spacecraft. The word features in the names of New Zealand government agencies such as Waka Kotahi (NZ Transport Agency) and the now-defunct "Te Manatū Waka" (Ministry of Transport).

== See also ==
- Chundan vallam
- Dragon boat
- Dugout canoe
- Hōkūleʻa
- Nouka Baich
- Polynesian Voyaging Society
- Salisipan
- Swan boat (racing)
- Tomako
- Vaka (sailing), a word with a similar etymology
- Waka hurdling, sport
- Waka jumping, switching political party
