= Anaweka River =

Coordinates: 40.7497°S 172.288°E

Location
- Country: New Zealand

Physical characteristics
- Mouth
  - location: Tasman Sea

The Anaweka River is small river in a remote area of the Tasman District of New Zealand. Its source is on the slopes of Mount White in the Wakamarama Range. The river flows to the Tasman Sea, the mouth being about 3 kilometres (2 mi) south of the southern end of the road from Farewell Spit and Collingwood. The river flows through the North-west Nelson Forest Park.

In January 2012, the Anaweka waka was discovered at the mouth of the Anaweka River.

== See also ==
- List of rivers of New Zealand
