= Dunedin =

City in Otago, New Zealand

Dunedin Ōtepoti (Māori)
- City
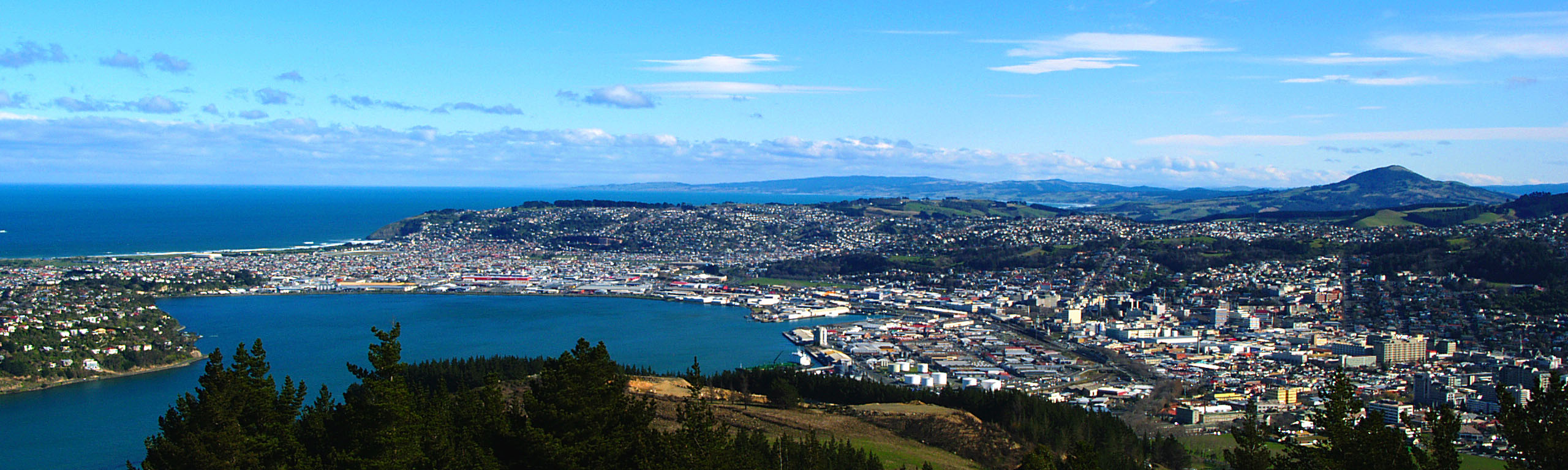
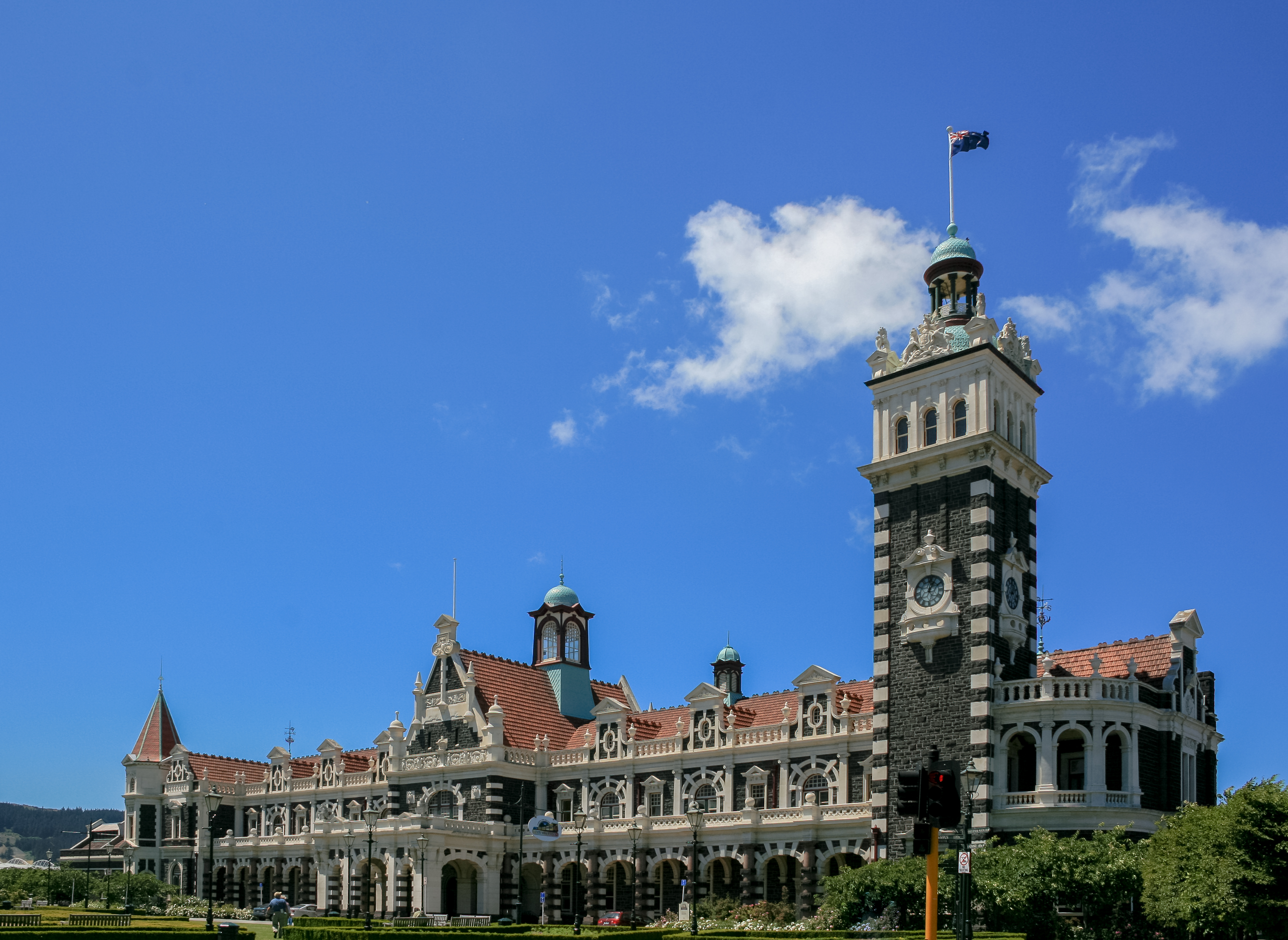
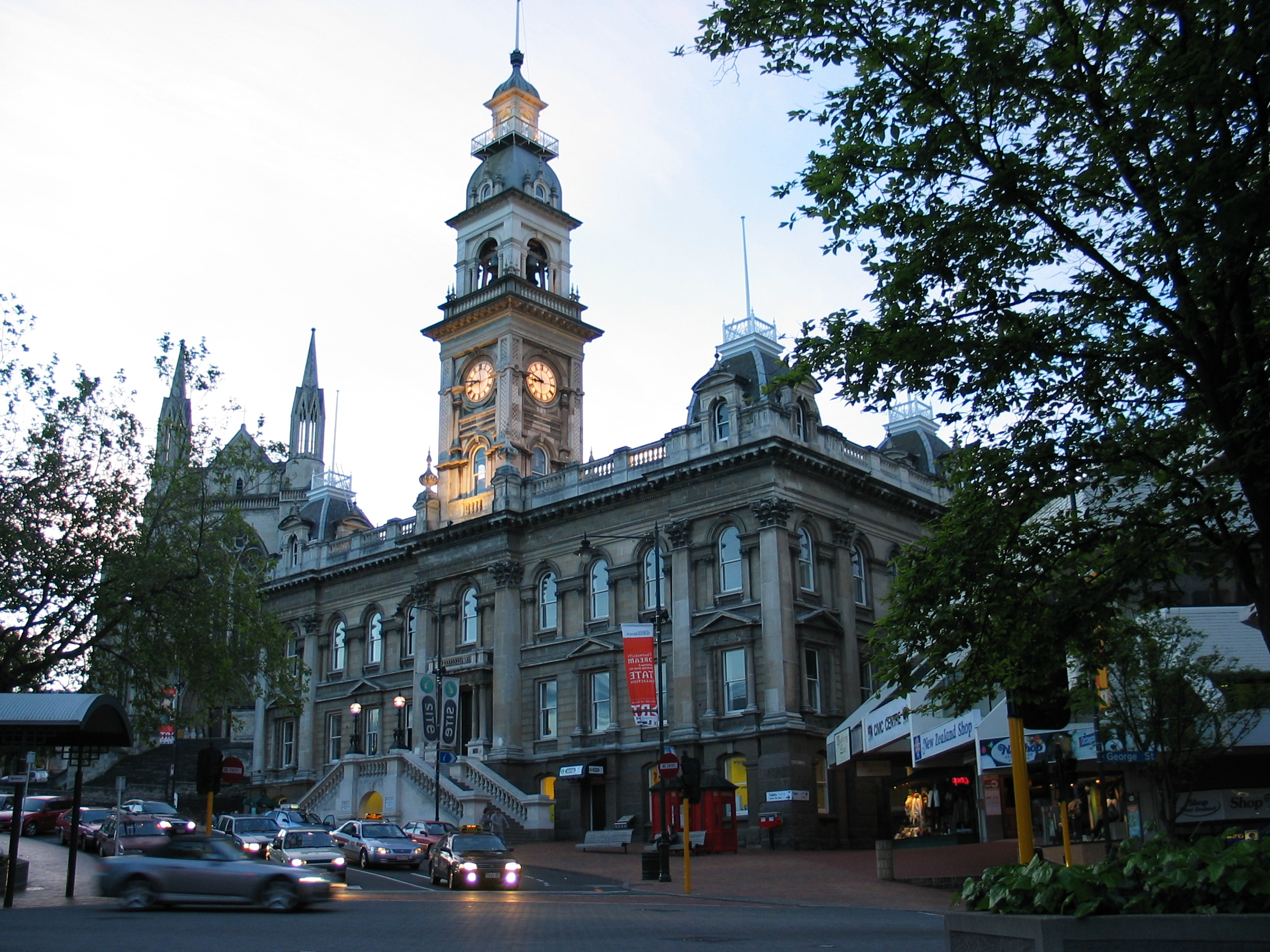
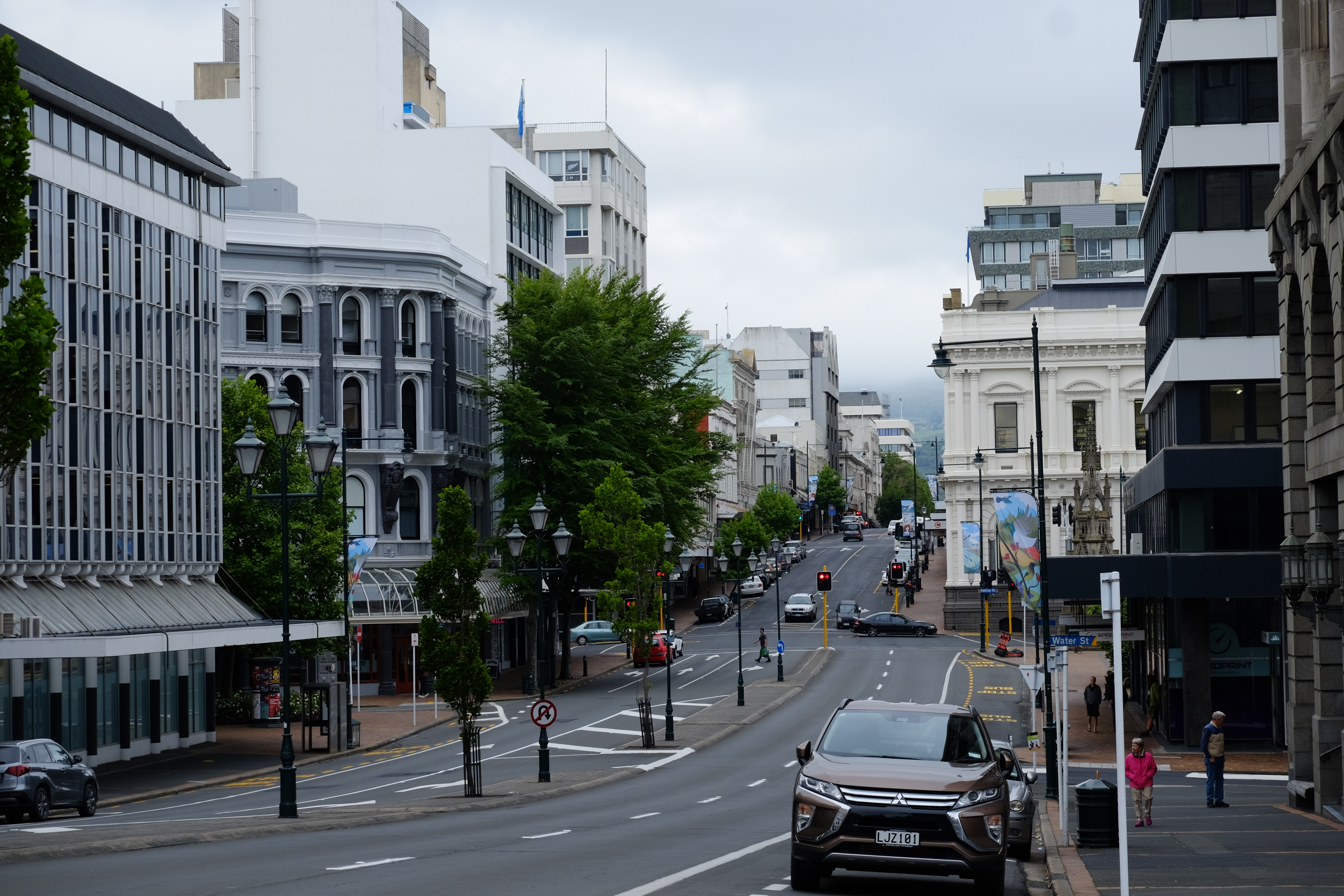
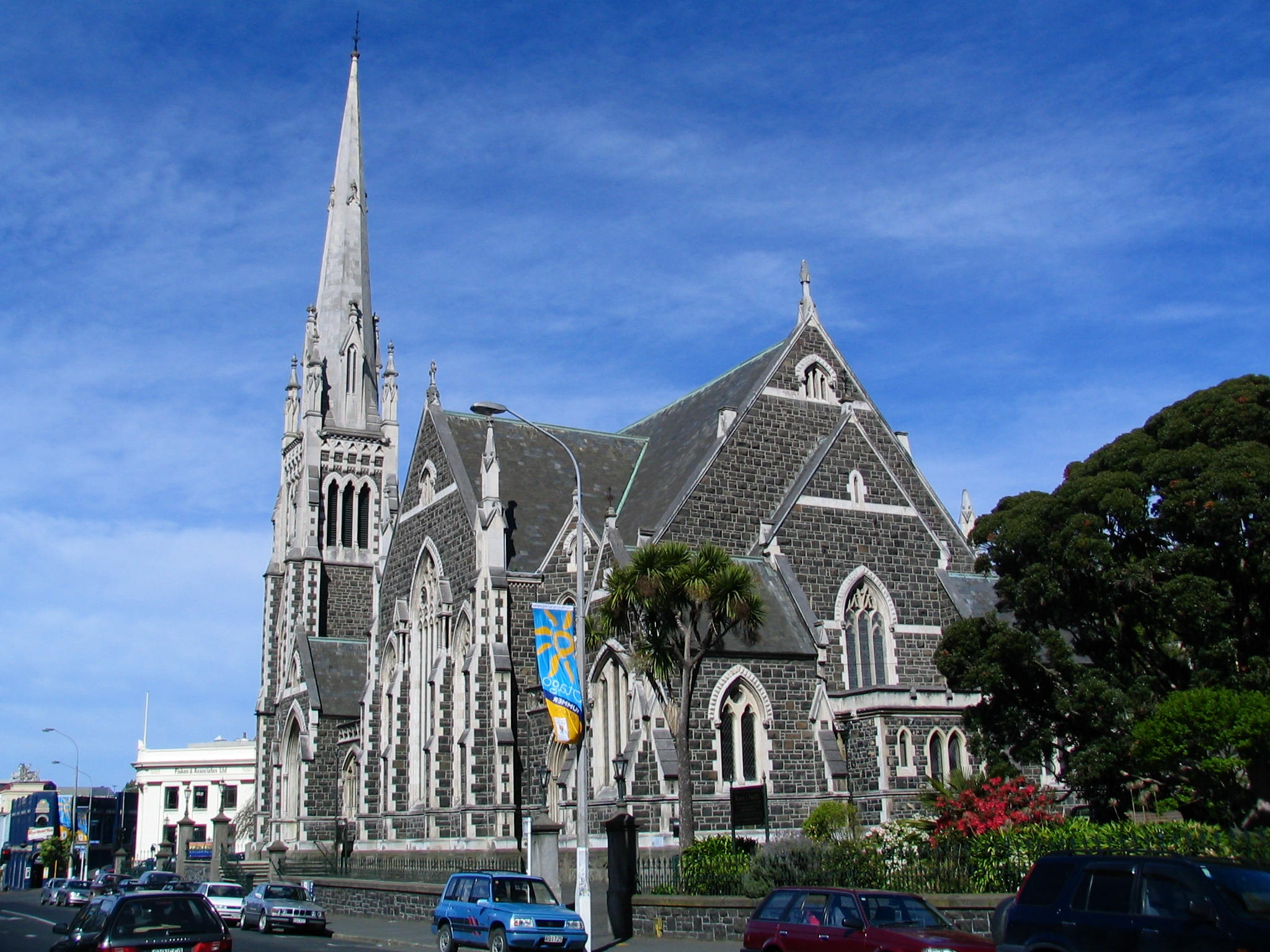
- Cityscape seen from Signal Hill Dunedin railway station Town Hall on The Octagon Princes Street Knox Church

- Flag Coat of arms
- Nicknames: Edinburgh of the South; Dunners (colloquial)
- Motto: Maiorum Institutis Utendo (By following in the Steps of our Forefathers)
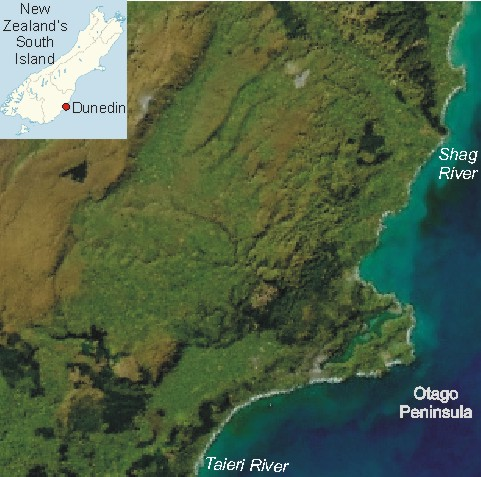
- Coordinates: 45°52′27″S 170°30′13″E
- Country: New Zealand
- Region: Otago
- Communities: Strath Taieri; Waikouaiti Coast; Mosgiel-Taieri; West Harbour; Otago Peninsula; Saddle Hill
- Settled by Māori: c. 1300
- Settled by Europeans: 1848
- Incorporated: 1855; 171 years ago
- Named for: Dùn Èideann – Scottish Gaelic name for Edinburgh
- NZ Parliament: Dunedin; Taieri; Te Tai Tonga (Māori)

Government
  - Type: Mayor–Council
  - Body: Dunedin City Council
  - Mayor: Sophie Barker
  - Deputy Mayor: Cherry Lucas
  - MPs: Rachel Brooking (Labour); Ingrid Leary (Labour); Tākuta Ferris (Te Pāti Māori)

Area
  - Territorial: 3,286.14 km^{2} (1,268.79 sq mi)
  - Urban: 91.16 km^{2} (35.20 sq mi)

Population (June 2025)
  - Territorial: 132,800
  - Density: 40.41/km^{2} (104.7/sq mi)
  - Urban: 104,000
  - Urban density: 1,140/km^{2} (2,950/sq mi)
- Demonym: Dunedinite
- Time zone: UTC+12:00 (NZST)
  - Summer (DST): UTC+13:00 (NZDT)
- Postcodes: 9010, 9011, 9012, 9013, 9014, 9016, 9018, 9022, 9023, 9024, 9035, 9076, 9077, 9081, 9082, 9092
- Area code: 03
- Local iwi: Ngāi Tahu
- Website: www.dunedin.govt.nz

Dunedin (/dʌˈniːdɪn/ dun-EE-din; (Note: Also pronounced /dʌˈniːdən/ dun-EE-dən or /dəˈniːdən/ də-NEE-dən.) Māori: Ōtepoti) is the second-most populous city in the South Island of New Zealand (after Christchurch), and the principal city of the Otago region. Its name comes from Dùn Èideann ("fort of Edin"), the Scottish Gaelic name for Edinburgh, the capital of Scotland. With an estimated population of 132,800 as of June 2025, Dunedin is New Zealand’s seventh most populous metropolitan and urban area.

For cultural, geographical, and historical reasons, the city has long been considered one of New Zealand's four main centres. (Note: The description of Auckland, Wellington, Christchurch and Dunedin as the four main centres neatly divides the country geographically into northern and southern halves of each of the two main islands. These centres are thus described in a wide range of fields, from encyclopedias of New Zealand to scientific research institutes, the tourism industry to nationwide organisations and government departments, and from the entertainment industry to newspaper reports.) The urban area of Dunedin lies on the central-eastern coast of Otago, surrounding the head of Otago Harbour. The harbour and hills around Dunedin are the remnants of an extinct volcano. The city suburbs extend out into the surrounding valleys and hills, onto the isthmus of the Otago Peninsula, and along the shores of the Otago Harbour and the Pacific Ocean.

Archaeological evidence points to the beginning of a lengthy occupation of the Dunedin area by Māori between 1250 and 1300 AD, with many pā constructed during the Classical period. Migrations by Kāi Tahu in the mid-17th century were followed by the arrival of Europeans sealers and whalers in the early 1800s. After an initial period of co-habitation and trade, the local Māori population was heavily reduced by introduced illnesses such as measles.

Sealer and ex-convict William Tucker was the first European to settle in the region, building a house at Murderers Beach in 1815. The Ōtākou whaling station established by the Weller Brothers was briefly one of the largest European settlements in New Zealand, but closed in the 1840s after whaling stocks had been hunted to near-extinction.

A Scottish settlement was established in 1848 by the Lay Association of the Free Church of Scotland, and between 1855 and 1900 many thousands of Scots emigrated to the incorporated city. Dunedin's population and wealth boomed during the 1860s' Otago gold rush. For a brief period of time it became New Zealand's largest urban area. The Union Company, which became the biggest shipping line in the Southern Hemisphere, was founded in Dunedin in 1875. The city saw substantial migration from mainland China at the same time, predominantly from Guangdong and Guangxi. Dunedin is home to New Zealand's oldest Chinese community.

Today, Dunedin has a diverse economy which includes manufacturing, publishing, arts, tourism and technology-based industries. The mainstay of the city's economy remains centred on tertiary education, with students from the University of Otago, New Zealand's oldest university, and the Otago Polytechnic, accounting for a large proportion of the population; 21.6 per cent of the city's population was aged between 15 and 24 at the 2006 census, compared to the New Zealand average of 14.2 per cent. Dunedin is also noted for its vibrant music scene, as the 1980s birthplace of the Dunedin sound (which heavily influenced grunge, indie and modern alternative rock). In 2014, the city was designated as a UNESCO City of Literature.

== History ==
=== Māori settlements ===
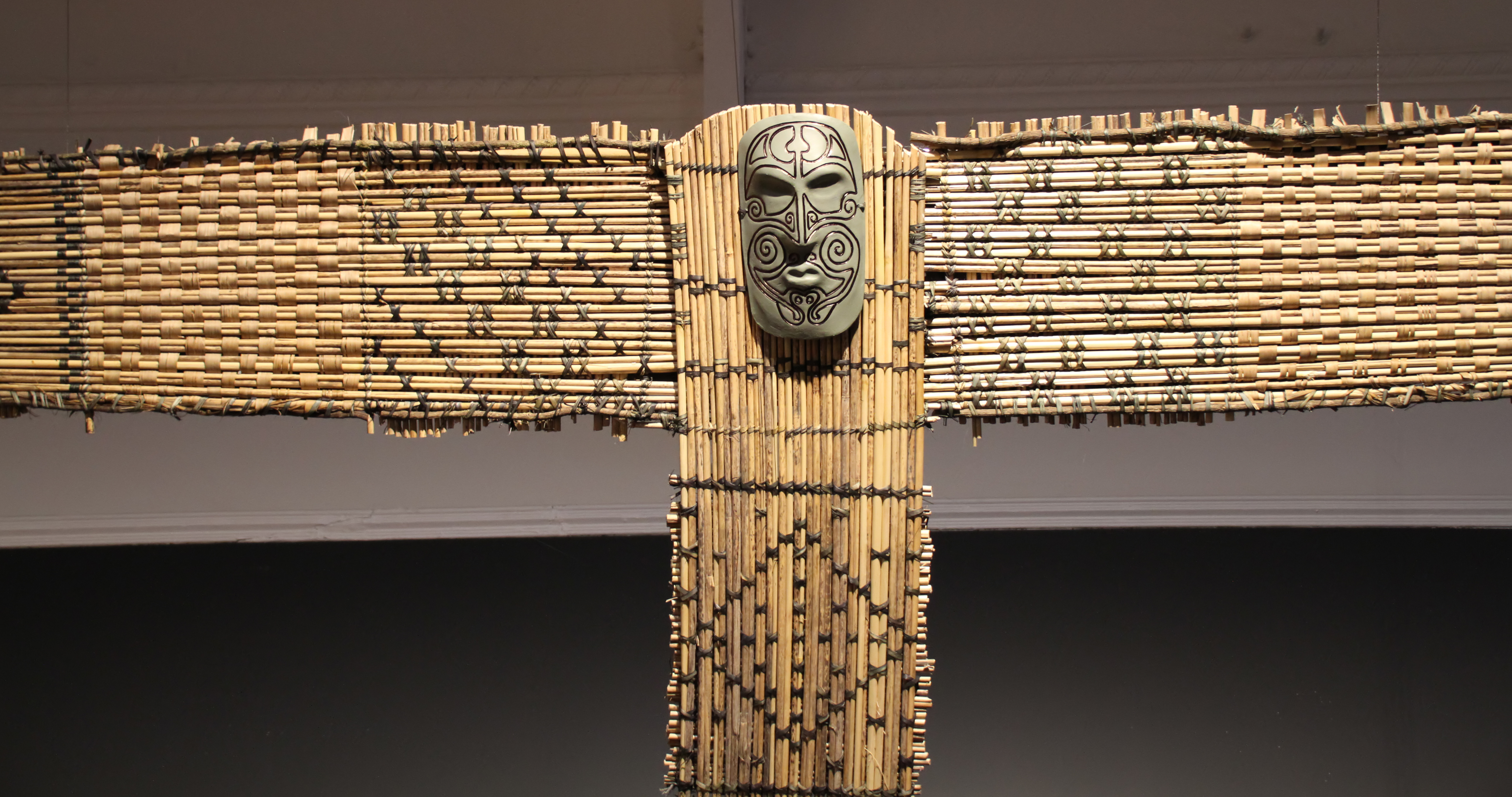
Dunedin Museum Māori artefact

Archaeological evidence shows the first human (Māori) occupation of New Zealand occurred between 1250 and 1300 AD, with the population concentrated along the southeast coast. A camp site at Kaikai Beach, near Long Beach to the north of the present-day city of Dunedin, has been dated from about that time. There are numerous archaic (moa-hunter) sites in what is now Dunedin, several of them large and permanently occupied, particularly in the 14th century. The population contracted but expanded again with the evolution of the Classical Māori culture which saw the building of several pā, fortified settlements, notably Pukekura (at Taiaroa Head), about 1650. There was a settlement in what is now central Dunedin (Ōtepoti), occupied as late as about 1785 but abandoned by 1826. There were also Māori settlements at Whareakeake (Murdering Beach), Pūrākaunui, Mapoutahi (Goat Island Peninsula) and Huriawa (Karitane Peninsula) to the north, and at Taieri Mouth and Otokia (Henley) to the south, all inside the present boundaries of Dunedin.

Māori tradition tells first of a people called Kahui Tipua living in the area, then Te Rapuwai, semi-legendary but considered to be historical. The next arrivals were Waitaha, followed by Kāti Māmoe late in the 16th century and then Kāi Tahu (Ngāi Tahu in modern standard Māori) who arrived in the mid-17th century. European accounts have often represented these successive influxes as "invasions", but modern scholarship has cast doubt on that view. They were probably migrations – like those of the Europeans – which incidentally resulted in bloodshed. The sealer John Boultbee recorded in the late 1820s that the 'Kaika Otargo' (settlements around and near Otago Harbour) were the oldest and largest in the south.

=== Early arrivals from Europe ===
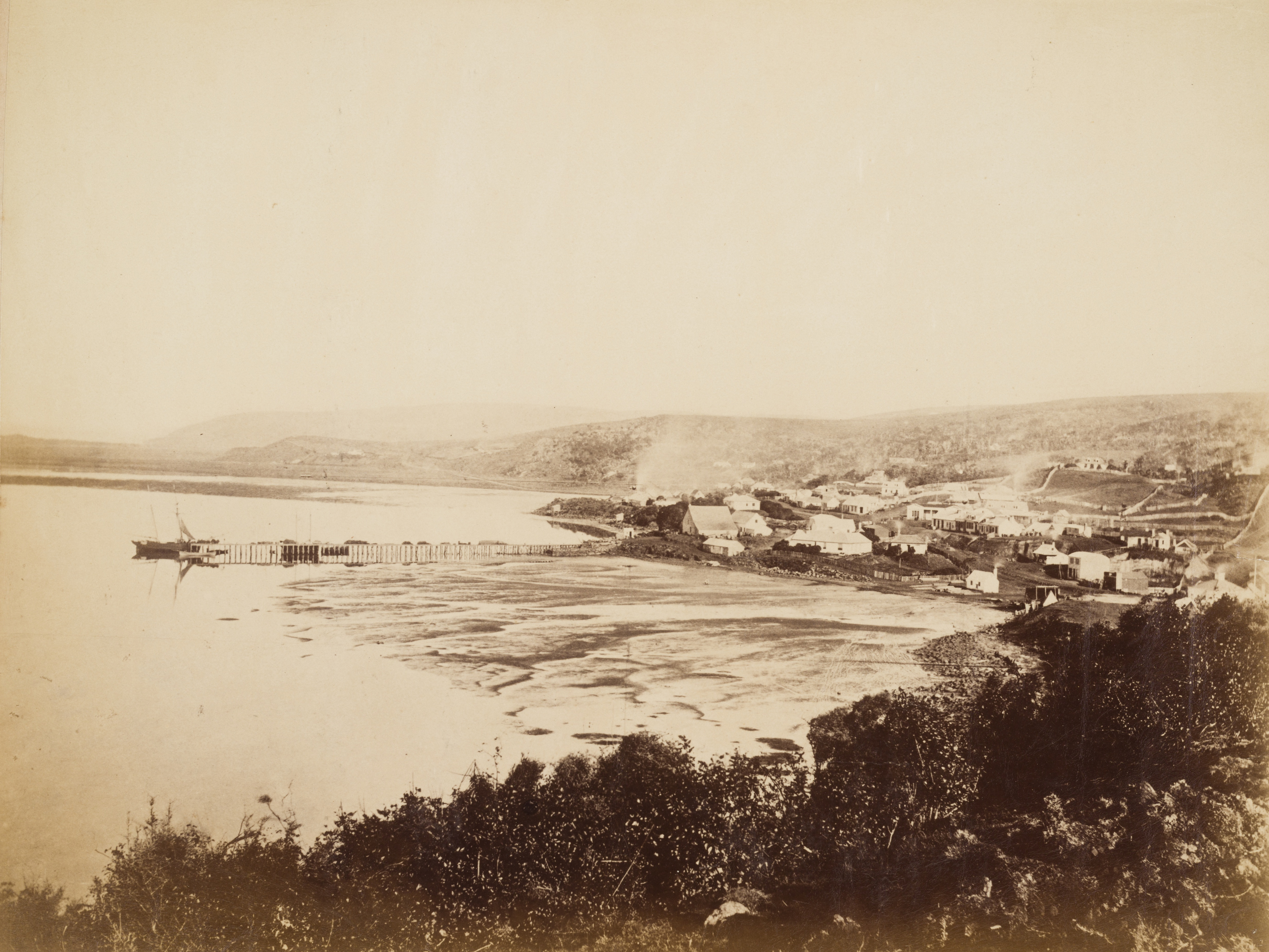
Dunedin, New Zealand, c. 1856

Lieutenant James Cook stood off what is now the coast of Dunedin between 25 February 1770 and 5 March 1770, naming Cape Saunders (on the Otago Peninsula) and Saddle Hill. He reported penguins and seals in the vicinity, which led Australian, American and British sealers to visit from the beginning of the 19th century. The early years of sealing saw a feud between sealers and local Māori from 1810 to 1823, the "Sealers' War" sparked by an incident on Otago Harbour. William Tucker was the first European to settle in the area, in 1815.

Permanent European occupation dates from 1831, when the Weller brothers of New South Wales founded their whaling station at Otago (present-day Ōtākou) on the Otago Harbour. Epidemics severely reduced the Māori population. By the late 1830s, the Harbour had become an international whaling port. Wright & Richards started a whaling station at Karitane in 1837 and Sydney-born Johnny Jones established a farming settlement and a mission station (the South Island's first) at Waikouaiti in 1840. The settlements at Karitane and Waikouaiti have endured, making modern Dunedin one of the longest-standing European-settled territories in New Zealand.

Early in 1844, the Deborah, captained by Thomas Wing and carrying (among others) his wife Lucy and a representative of the New Zealand Company, Frederick Tuckett, sailed south from Nelson to determine the location of a planned Free Church settlement. After inspecting several areas around the eastern coast of the South Island, Tuckett selected the site which would become known as Dunedin. (Tuckett rejected the site of what would become Christchurch, as he felt the ground around the Avon River / Ōtākaro was swampy.)

The Lay Association of the Free Church of Scotland, through a company called the Otago Association, founded Dunedin at the head of Otago Harbour in 1848 as the principal town of its special settlement.

The name "Dunedin" comes from Dùn Èideann, the Scottish Gaelic name for Edinburgh, the capital of Scotland. Charles Kettle the city's surveyor, instructed to emulate the characteristics of Edinburgh, produced a striking, "Romantic" town-planning design. There resulted both grand and quirky streets, as the builders struggled and sometimes failed to construct his bold vision across the challenging landscape. Captain William Cargill (1784–1860), a veteran of the Napoleonic Wars, served as the secular leader of the new colony. The Reverend Thomas Burns (1796–1871), a nephew of the poet Robert Burns, provided spiritual guidance. By the end of the 1850s, around 12,000 Scots had emigrated to Dunedin, many from the industrial lowlands.

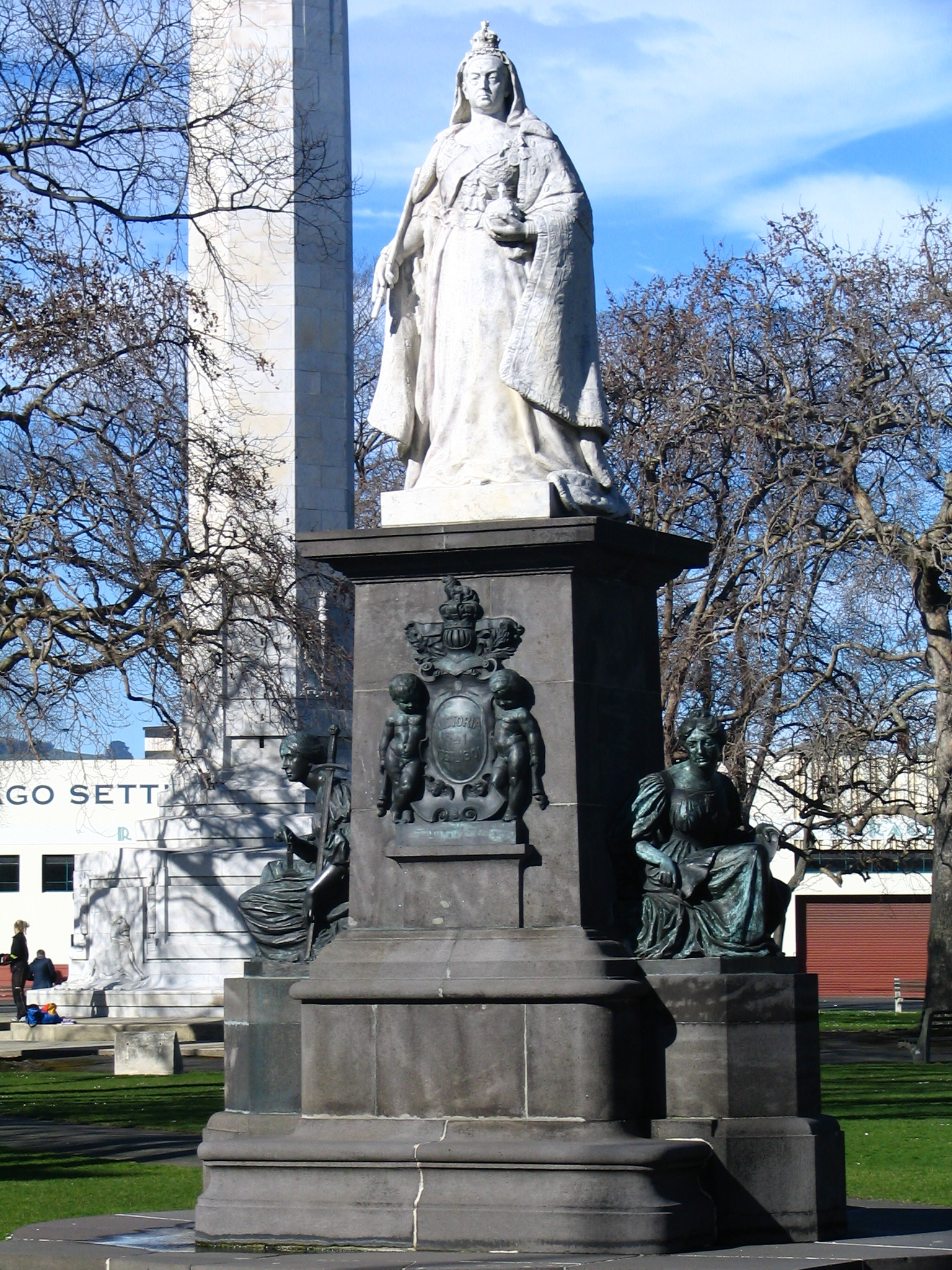
Statue of Queen Victoria in Queens Gardens in Dunedin. Europeans settled in Dunedin intensively during the Victorian era.

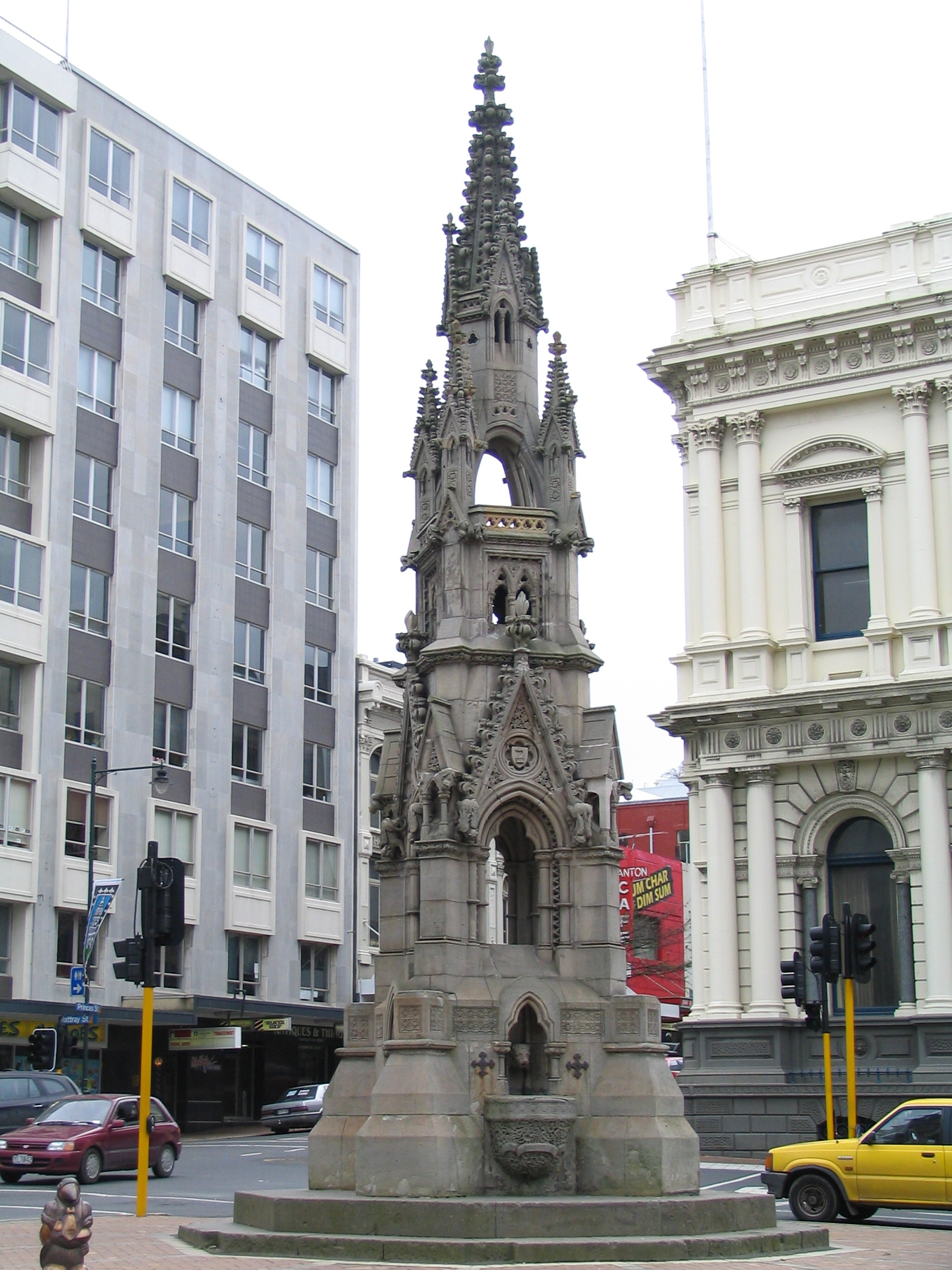
Monument to William Cargill on Princes Street

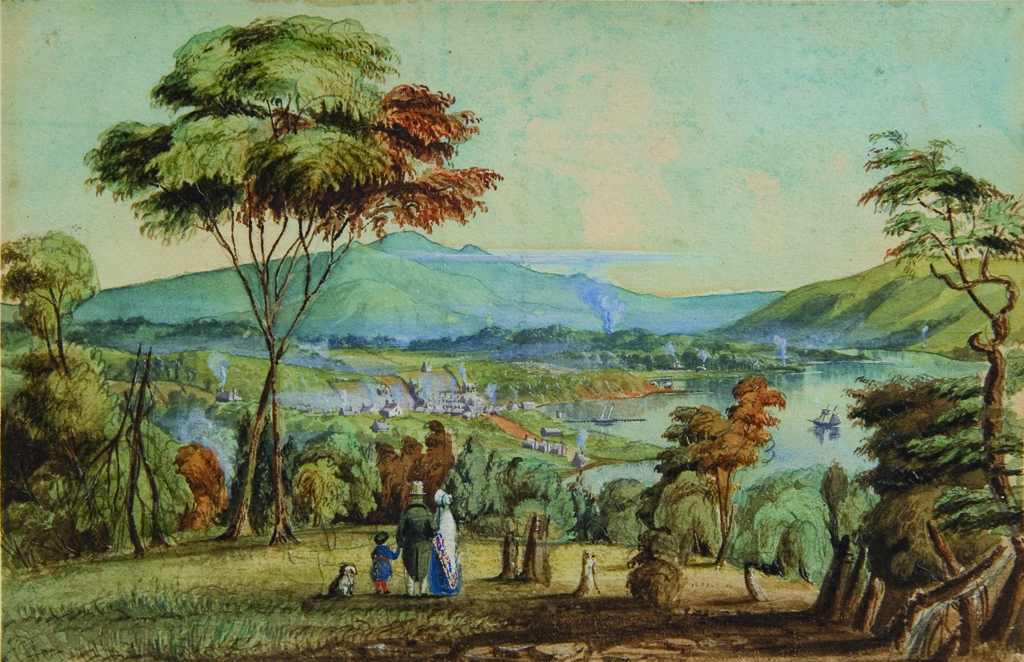
Dunedin from Little Paisley (1849)

=== Gold rush era ===
In 1852, Dunedin became the capital of the Otago Province, the whole of New Zealand from the Waitaki south. In 1861, the discovery of gold at Gabriel's Gully, to the south-west, led to a rapid influx of people and saw Dunedin become New Zealand's first city by growth of population in 1865. The new arrivals included many Irish, but also Italians, Lebanese, French, Germans, Jews and Chinese. The Dunedin Southern Cemetery was established in 1858, the Dunedin Northern Cemetery in 1872. In the 1860s, Ross Creek Reservoir was created so as to serve Dunedin's need for water.

The London-owned Bank of Otago opened its doors in Dunedin in 1863, opened 12 branches throughout its region, then in 1873 merged with the new National Bank of New Zealand also based in London and also operated from Dunedin but, true to its name, it rapidly expanded throughout New Zealand. Dunedin remained the principal local source of the nation's development capital until the Second World War.

Dunedin and the region industrialised and consolidated, and the Main South Line connected the city with Christchurch in 1878 and Invercargill in 1879. Otago Boys' High School was founded in 1863. The Otago Museum opened in 1868. The University of Otago, the oldest university in New Zealand, in 1869. Otago Girls' High School was established in 1871.

By 1874, Dunedin and its suburbs had become New Zealand's largest city with a population of 29,832 displacing Auckland's 27,840 residents to second place. A major innovation for the city's rapidly expanding economy was the foundation of the Union Company, a shipping line founded by James Mills in Dunedin in 1875, with the backing of Scottish shipbuilder Peter Denny. The line became the largest in the Southern Hemisphere, and by the 1890s dominated shipping along its San Francisco-Auckland-Sydney route. Competition from the American line Matson, Inc. after the annexation of Hawaii threatened Union Company's dominance and forced them to switch the Auckland stop for Wellington-Rarotonga-Papeete.

Between 1881 and 1957, Dunedin was home to cable trams, being both one of the first and last such systems in the world. Early in the 1880s the inauguration of the frozen meat industry, with the first shipment leaving from Port Chalmers in 1882, saw the beginning of a later great national industry. The first successful commercial shipment of frozen meat from New Zealand to the United Kingdom was on the Dunedin in 1881.

After ten years of gold rushes the economy slowed but Julius Vogel's immigration and development scheme brought thousands more, especially to Dunedin and Otago, before recession set in again in the 1880s. In these first and second times of prosperity, many institutions and businesses were established, New Zealand's first daily newspaper, art school, medical school and public art gallery. The Dunedin Public Art Gallery was among these new foundations. It had been actively promulgated by artist William Mathew Hodgkins. There was also a remarkable architectural flowering producing many substantial and ornamental buildings. R. A. Lawson's First Church of Otago and Knox Church are notable examples, as are buildings by Maxwell Bury and F. W. Petre. The other visual arts also flourished under the leadership of W. M. Hodgkins. The city's landscape and burgeoning townscape were vividly portrayed by George O'Brien (1821–1888). From the mid-1890s, the economy revived. Institutions such as the Otago Settlers Museum (now renamed as Toitū Otago Settlers Museum) and the Hocken Collections—the first of their kind in New Zealand—were founded. More notable buildings such as the Railway Station and Olveston were erected. New energy in the visual arts represented by G. P. Nerli culminated in the career of Frances Hodgkins.

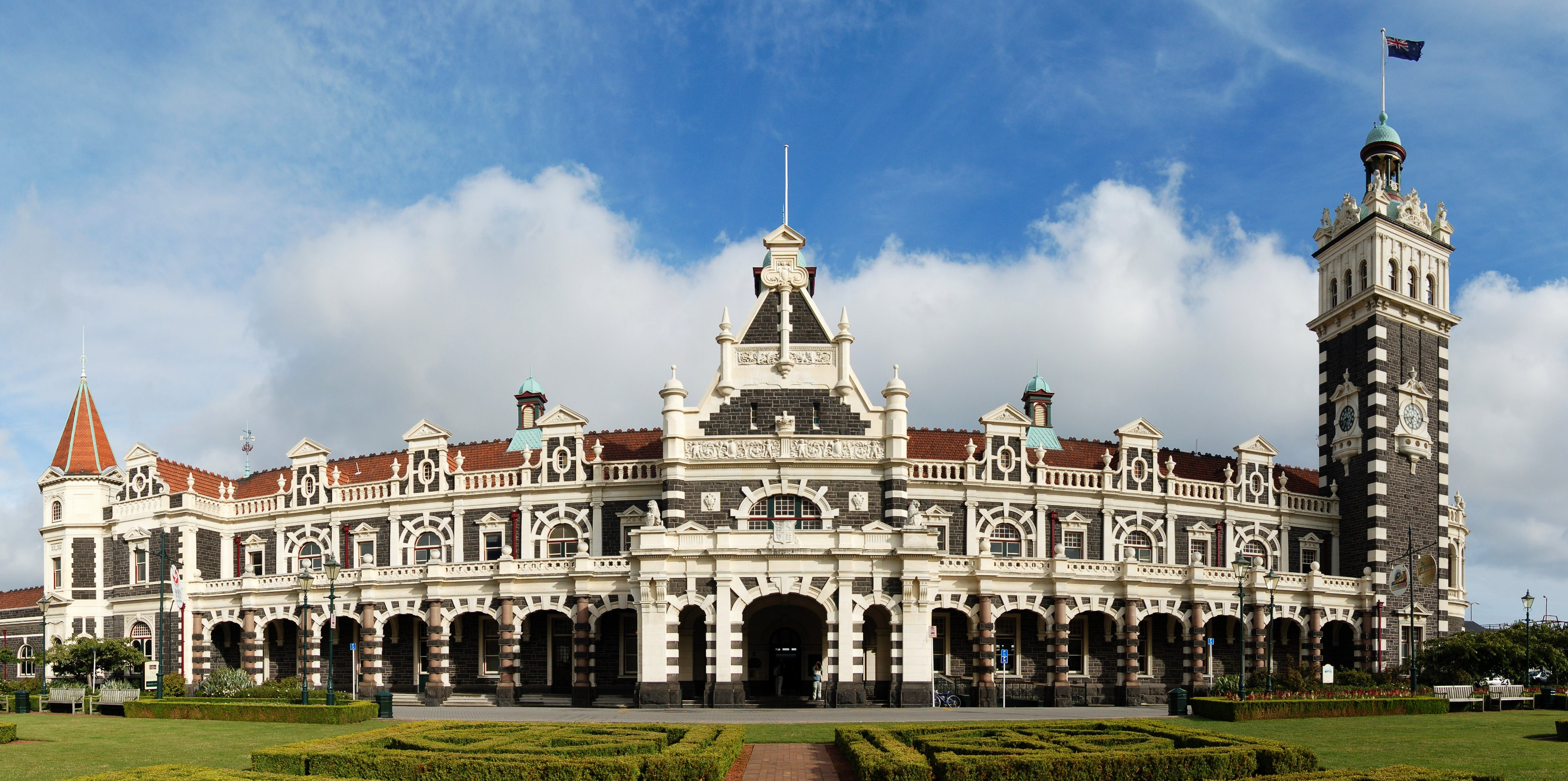
Dunedin railway station, built in 1906, is famed for its "gingerbread" architecture.

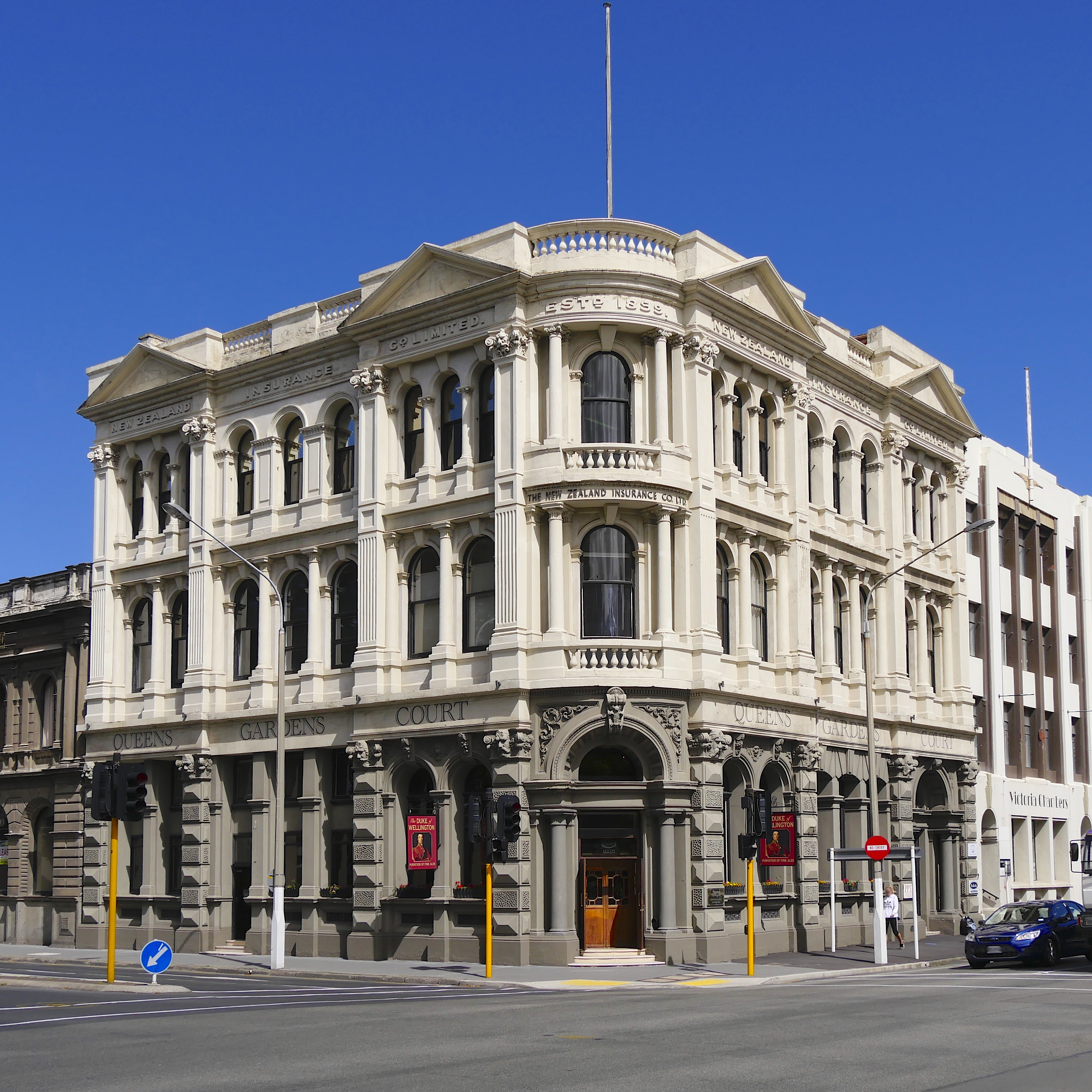
New Zealand Insurance Co Ltd, Dunedin (built 1899)

=== Early modern era ===
By 1900, Dunedin was no longer the country's biggest city. Influence and activity moved north to the other centres ("the drift north"), a trend which continued for much of the following century. Despite this, the university continued to expand, and a student quarter became established. At the same time, people started to notice Dunedin's mellowing, the ageing of its grand old buildings, with writers like E. H. McCormick pointing out its atmospheric charm. In 1901 the British royals, the Duke and Duchess of Cornwall and York toured Dunedin. Dunedin grew during the early 20th-century via annexation of surrounding municipalities — between 1904 and 1916 Dunedin annexed the boroughs of Caversham, South Dunedin, North East Valley, Maori Hill, Roslyn, and Mornington as well as the Bay Town District. In 1963 West Harbour Borough was annexed by Dunedin and in 1968 it annexed the entire Peninsula County.

In the 1930s and early 1940s a new generation of artists such as M. T. (Toss) Woollaston, Doris Lusk, Anne Hamblett, Colin McCahon and Patrick Hayman once again represented the best of the country's talent. The Second World War saw the dispersal of these painters, but not before McCahon had met a very youthful poet, James K. Baxter, in a central city studio.

Numerous large companies had been established in Dunedin, many of which became national leaders. Late among them was Fletcher Construction, founded by Sir James Fletcher in the early 20th century. Kempthorne Prosser, established in 1879 in Stafford Street, was the largest fertiliser and drug manufacturer in the country for over 100 years. G. Methven, a metalworking and tap manufacturer based in South Dunedin, was also a leading firm, as was H. E. Shacklock, an iron founder and appliance manufacturer later taken over by the Auckland concern Fisher and Paykel. The Mosgiel Woollens was another Victorian Dunedin foundation. Hallensteins was the colloquial name of a menswear manufacturer and national retail chain, while the DIC and Arthur Barnett were department stores, the former a nationwide concern. Coulls, Somerville Wilkie—later part of the Whitcoulls group—had its origins in Dunedin in the 19th century. There were also the National Mortgage and Agency Company of New Zealand, Wright Stephensons Limited, the Union Steamship Company and the National Insurance Company and the Standard Insurance Company among many others, which survived into the 20th century.

Panorama of the Botanical Gardens, c.1923–1928

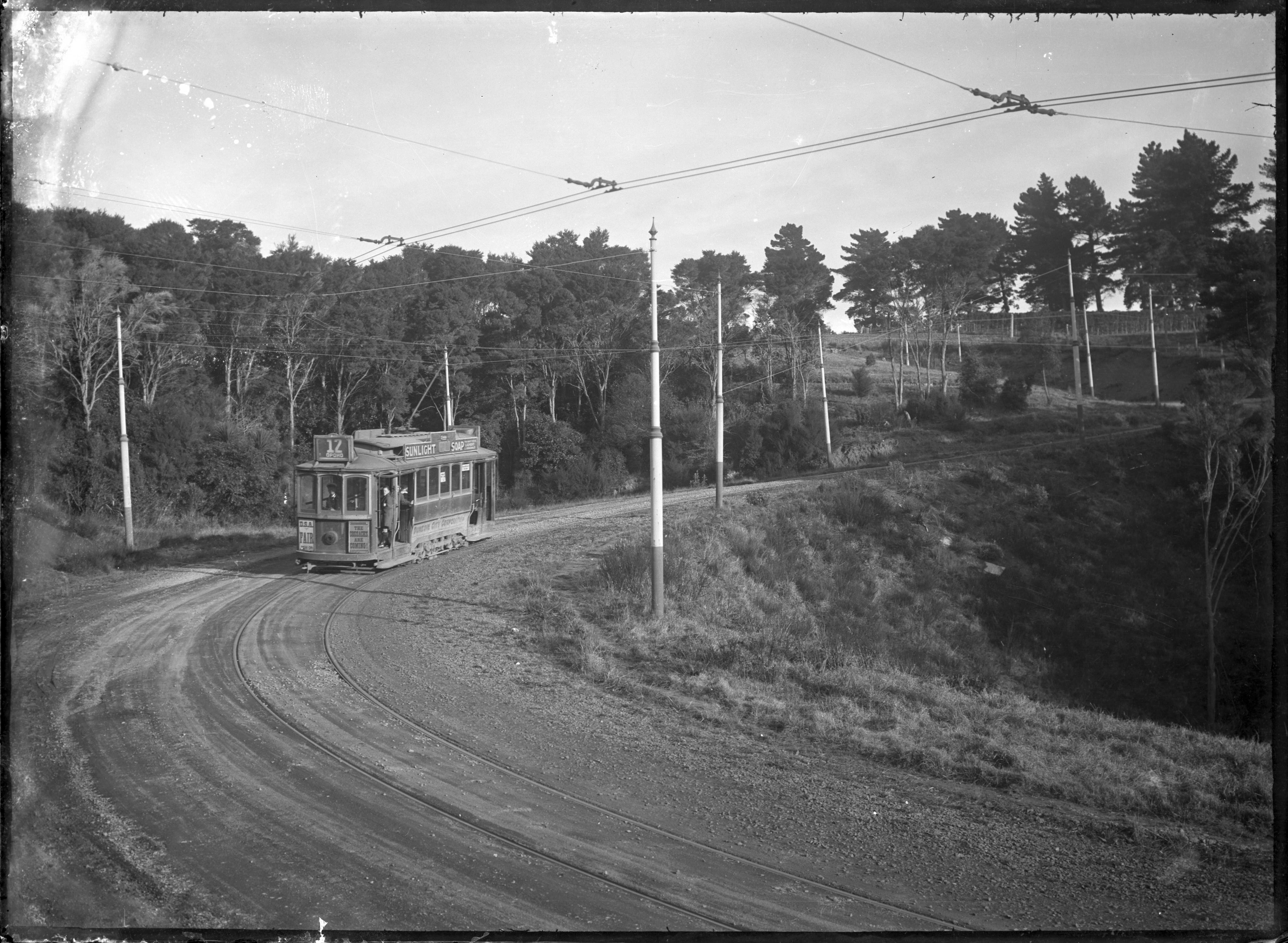
Opoho tram in Dunedin (1926)

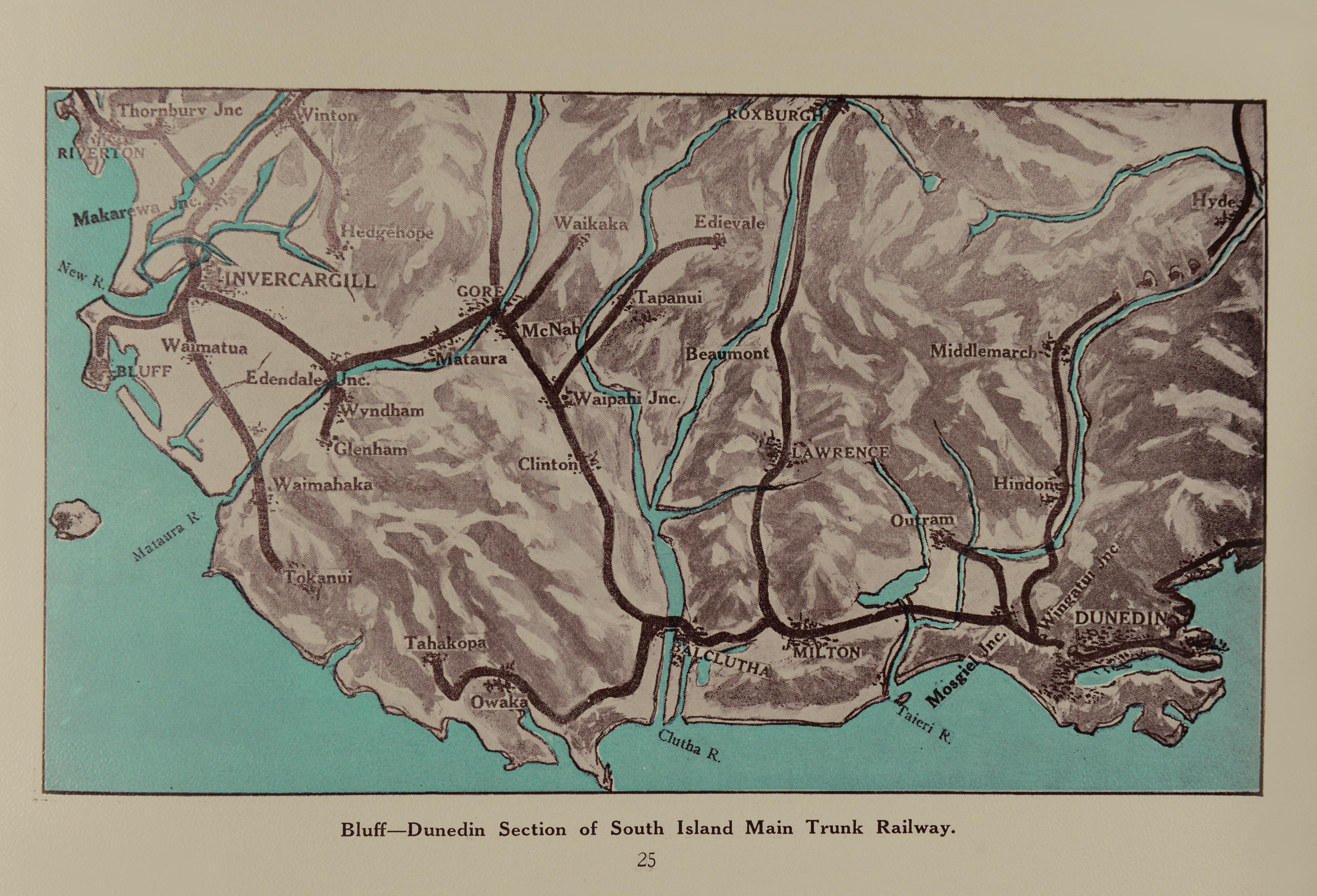
Dunedin area railway map (1928)

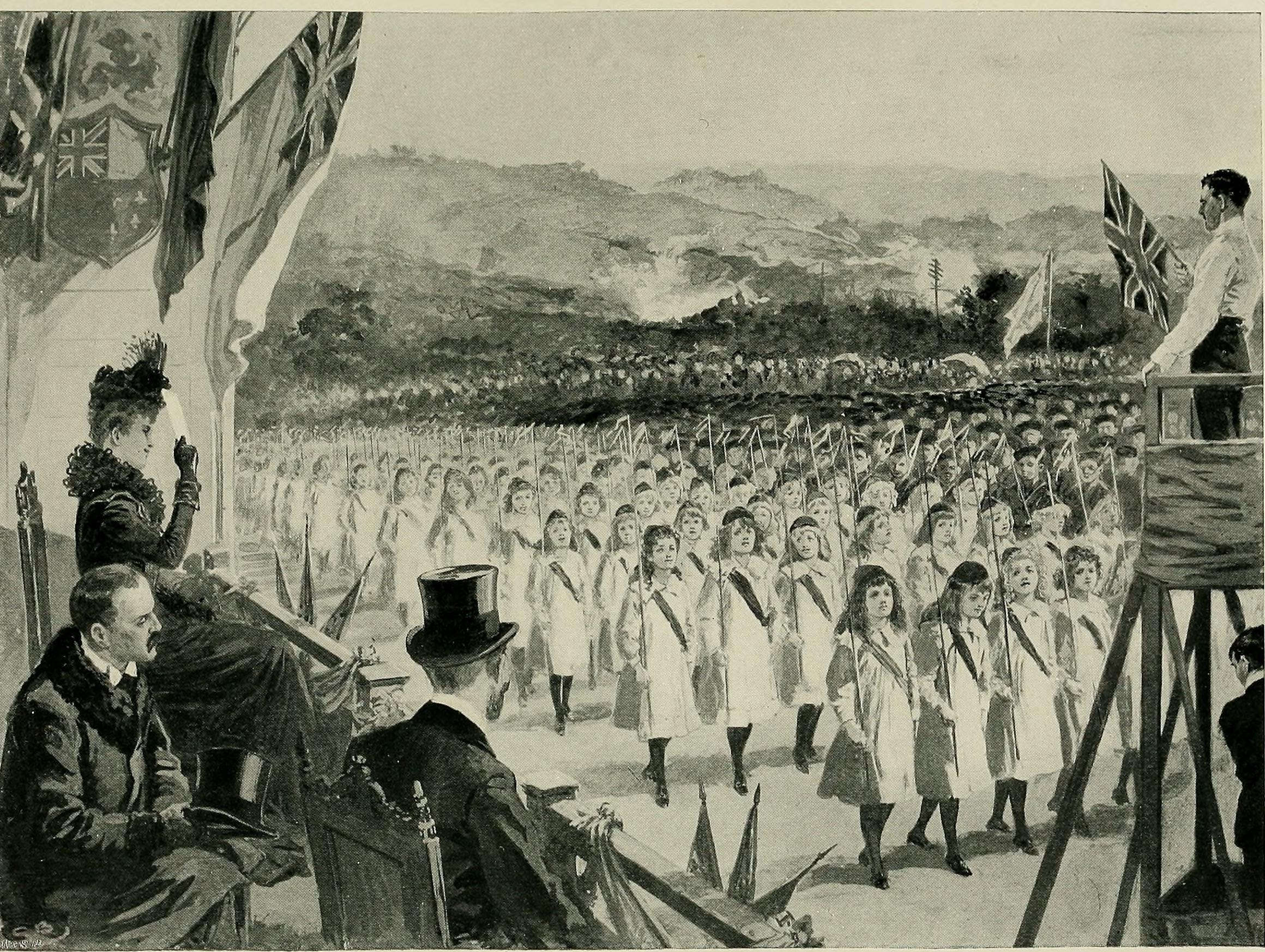
Royal tour of Dunedin in 1901

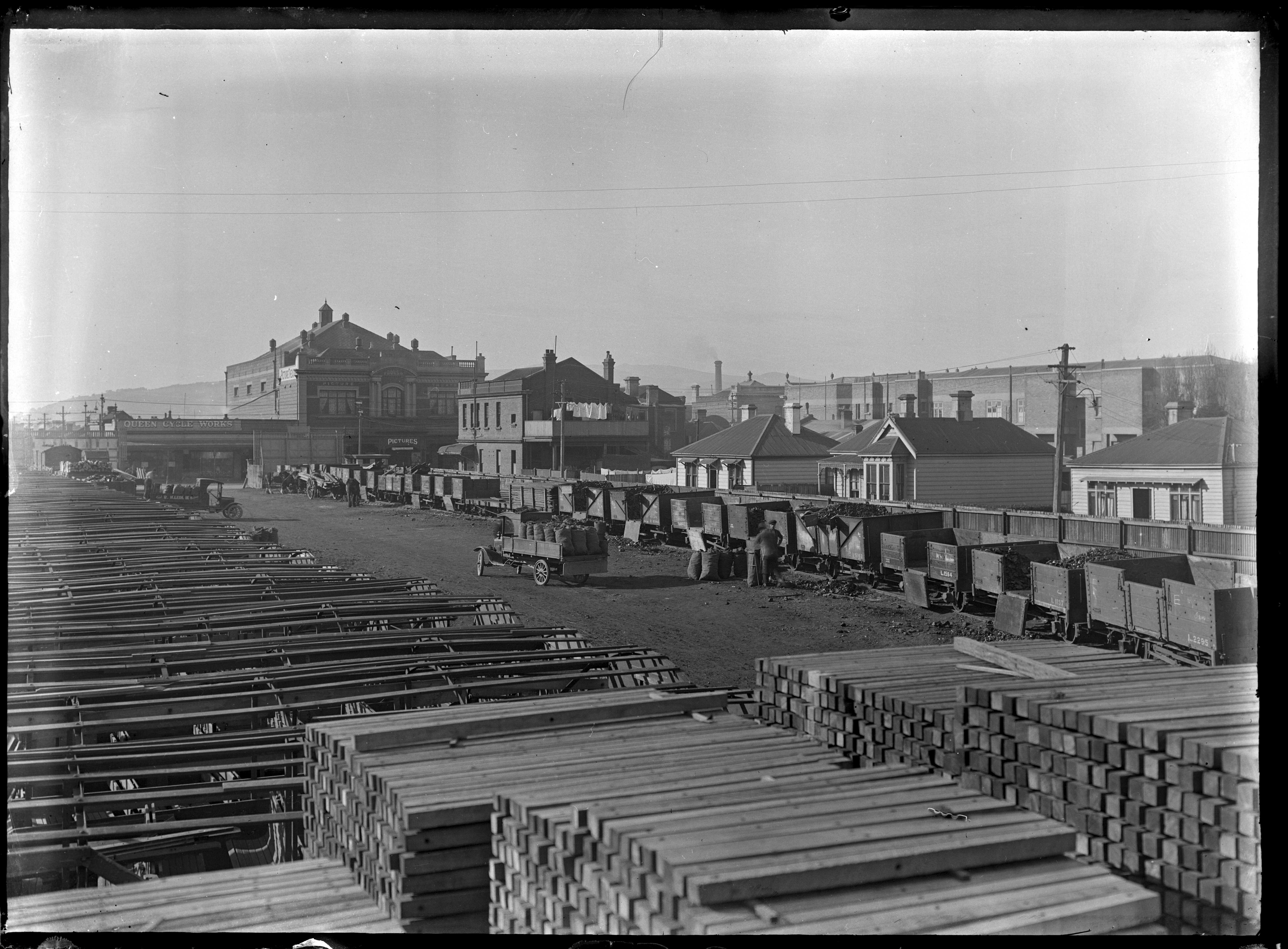
Railway siding for unloading coal and timber, Dunedin (1926)

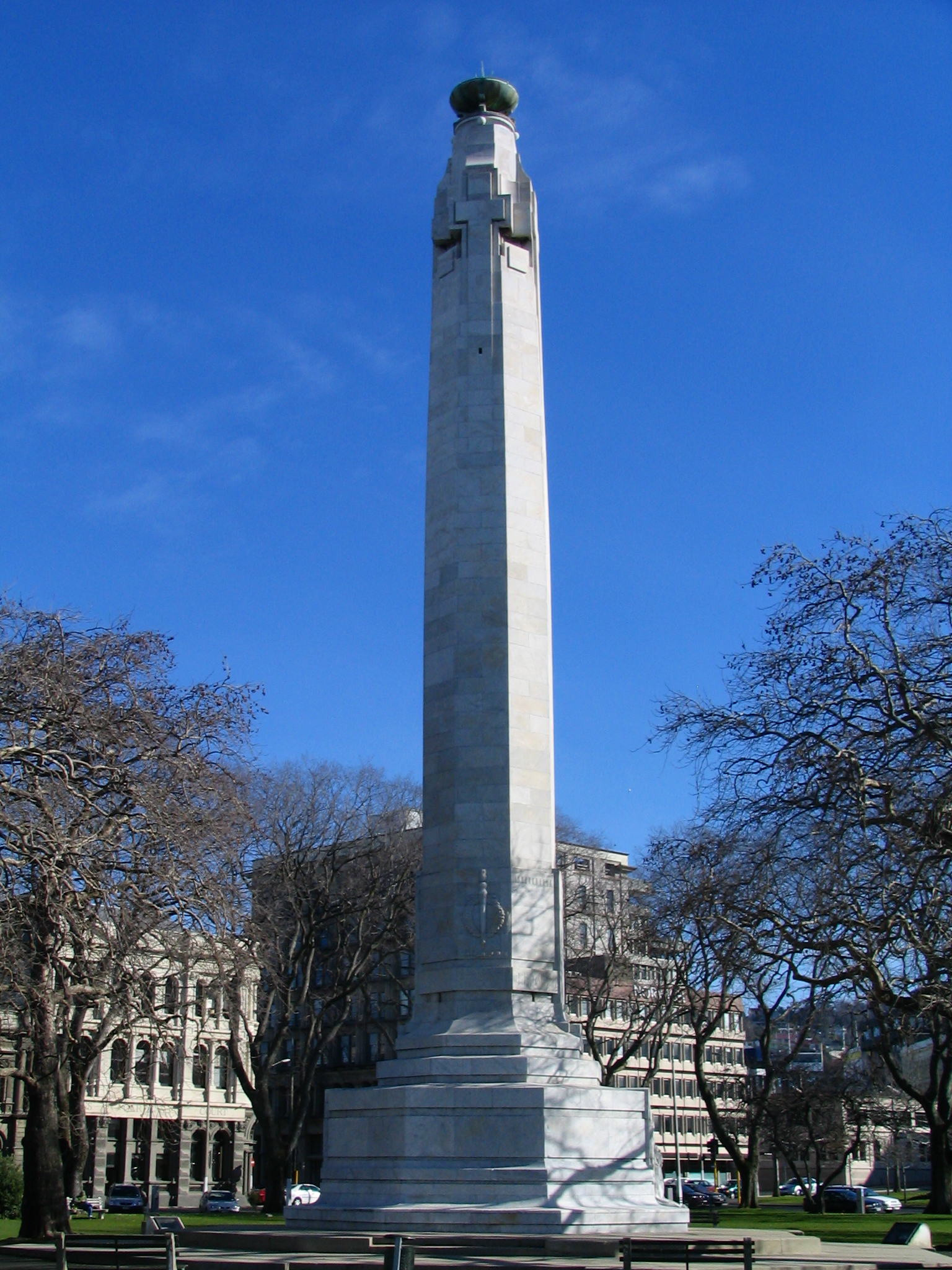
Dunedin Cenotaph, erected in 1927

=== Post-war developments ===
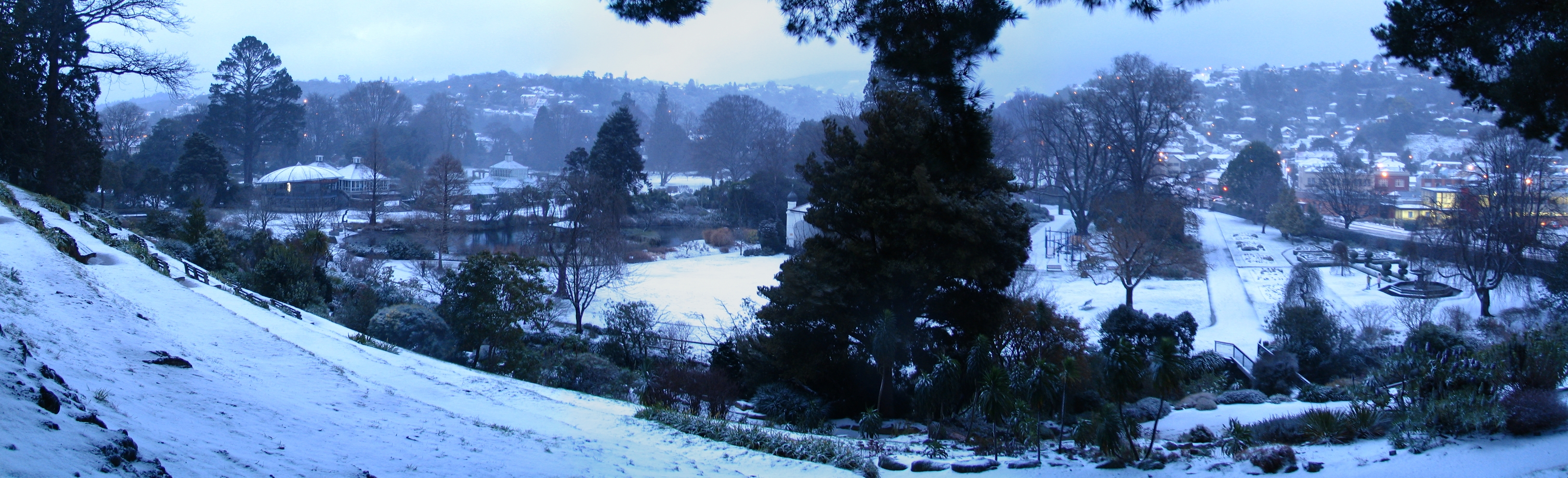
Dunedin Botanic Gardens in winter

After the Second World War prosperity and population growth revived, although Dunedin trailed as the fourth 'main centre'. A generation reacting against Victorianism started demolishing its buildings and many were lost, notably William Mason's Stock exchange in 1969. (Dunedin Stock Exchange building) Although the university continued to expand, the city's population contracted, notably from 1976 to 1981. This was a culturally vibrant time with the university's new privately endowed arts fellowships bringing writers including James K Baxter, Ralph Hotere, Janet Frame and Hone Tuwhare to the city.

During the 1980s Dunedin's popular music scene blossomed, with many acts, such as The Chills, The Clean, The Verlaines and Straitjacket Fits, gaining national and international recognition. The term "The Dunedin sound" was coined to describe the 1960s-influenced, guitar-led music which flourished at the time. Bands and musicians are still playing and recording in many styles.

By 1990, population decline had steadied and slow growth occurred thereafter with Dunedin re-inventing itself as a 'heritage city' with its main streets refurbished in the Victorian style. R. A. Lawson's Municipal Chambers (Dunedin Town Hall) in the Octagon were handsomely restored. The city was also recognised as a centre of excellence in tertiary education and research. The university's and polytechnic's growth accelerated. Dunedin has continued to refurbish itself, embarking on redevelopments of the art gallery, railway station and the Toitū Otago Settlers Museum. Meanwhile, the continued blossoming of local creative writing saw the city gain UNESCO City of Literature status in 2014.

Dunedin has flourishing niche industries including engineering, software engineering, biotechnology and fashion. Port Chalmers on the Otago Harbour provides Dunedin with deep-water facilities. It is served by the Port Chalmers Branch, a branch line railway which diverges from the Main South Line and runs from Christchurch by way of Dunedin to Invercargill. Dunedin is also home to MTF, the nationwide vehicle finance company.

The cityscape glitters with gems of Victorian and Edwardian architecture—the legacy of the city's gold-rush affluence. Many, including First Church, Otago Boys' High School and Larnach Castle were designed by one of New Zealand's most eminent architects R. A. Lawson. Other prominent buildings include Olveston and the Dunedin Railway Station. Other unusual or memorable buildings or constructions are Baldwin Street, claimed to be the world's steepest residential street; the Captain Cook tavern; Cadbury Chocolate Factory (Cadbury World) (In 2018, both the factory and Cadbury World closed to make way for a new NZ$1.4 billion hospital to replace the existing Dunedin Public Hospital); and the Speight's brewery.

The thriving tertiary student population has led to a vibrant youth culture (students are referred to as 'Scarfies' by people who are not students), consisting of the previously mentioned music scene, and more recently a burgeoning boutique fashion industry. A strong visual arts community also exists in Dunedin, notably in Port Chalmers and the other settlements which dot the coast of the Otago Harbour, and also in communities such as Waitati.

Sport is catered for in Dunedin by the floodlit rugby and cricket venues of Forsyth Barr Stadium and University Oval, Dunedin, respectively, the new Caledonian Ground football and athletics stadium near the university at Logan Park, the large Edgar Centre indoor sports centre, the Dunedin Ice Stadium, and numerous golf courses and parks. There is also the Wingatui horseracing course to the south of the city. St Clair Beach is a well-known surfing venue, and the harbour basin is popular with windsurfers and kitesurfers. Dunedin has four public swimming pools: Moana Pool, Port Chalmers Pool, Te Puna o Whakaehu and St Clair Salt Water Pool.

In February 2021, the East Otago towns of Waikouaiti and Karitane in New Zealand reported high lead levels in their water supplies. Local and national authorities responded by dispatching water tanks to assist local residents and providing free blood tests, fruits and vegetables. The lead poisoning scare also attracted coverage by national media. By early March 2021, the Southern District Health Board confirmed that test results indicated that long-term exposure to lead in the water supply posed little risk to the local population.

In late January 2024, the Dunedin City Council and Otago Regional Council released a joint draft strategy to expand housing development and industrial land over the next thirty years to accommodate a projected 10% population growth.

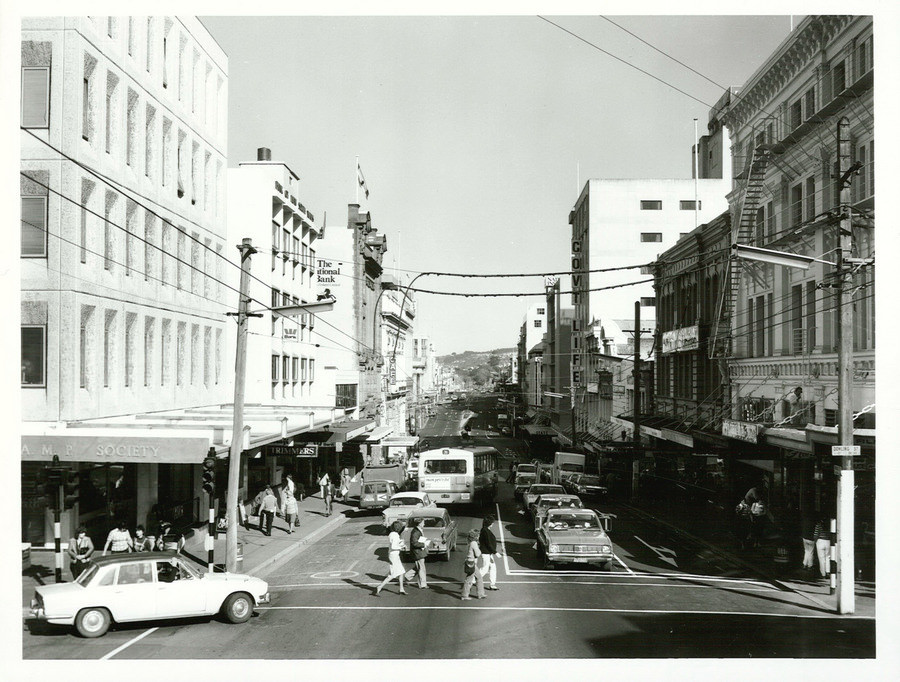
Princes Street in April 1982

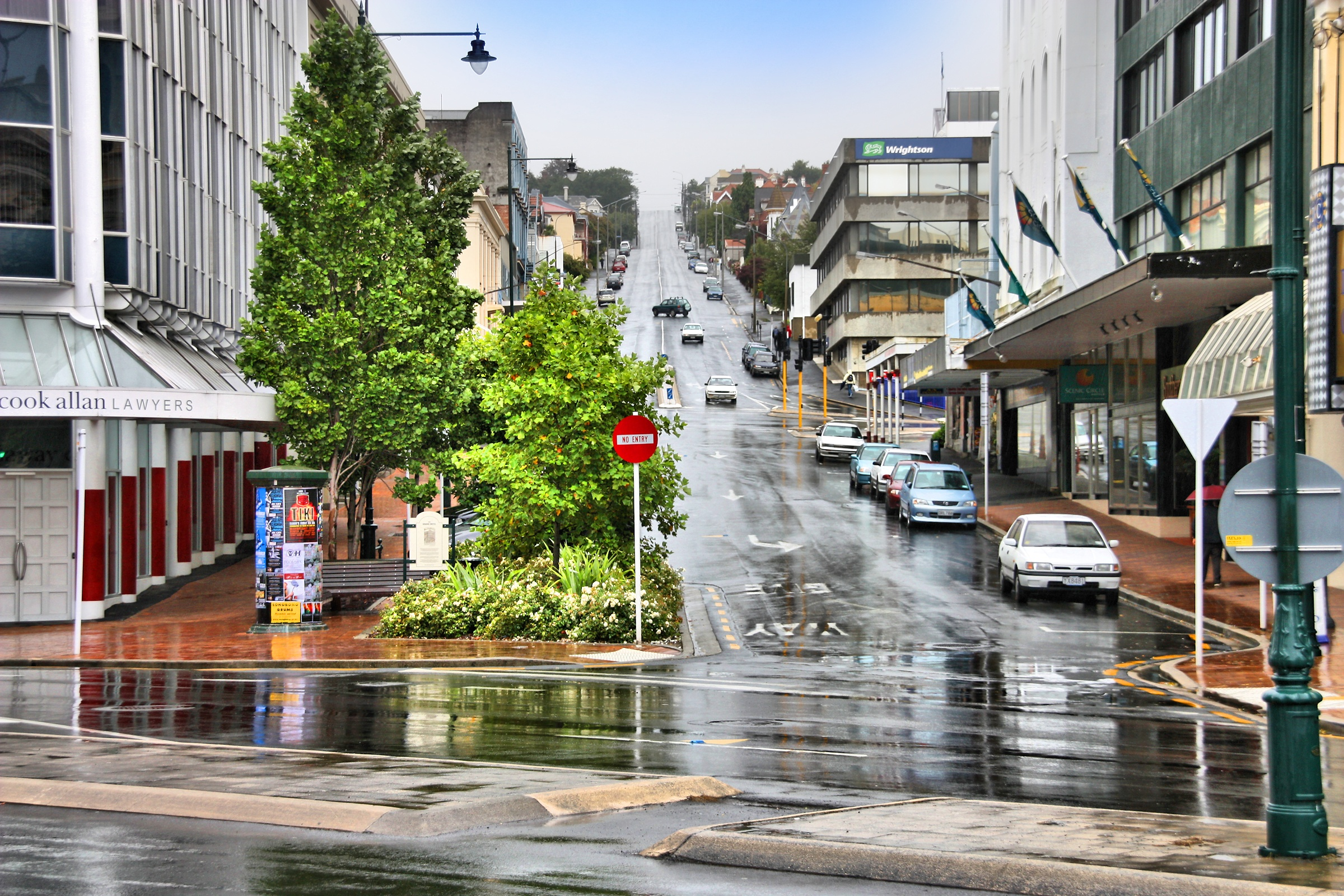
High Street Dunedin (2009)

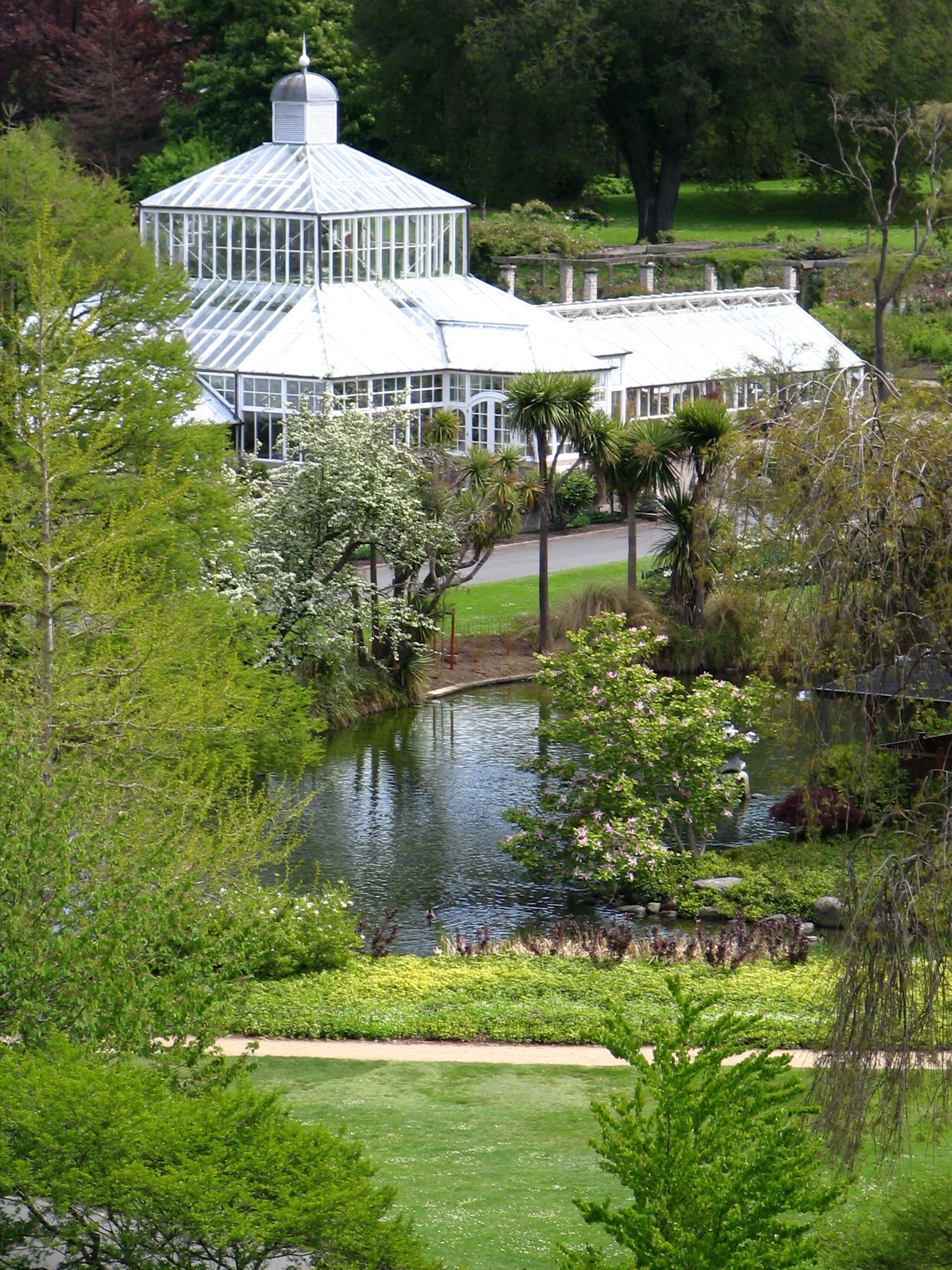
Botanic Gardens in Spring

== Geography ==
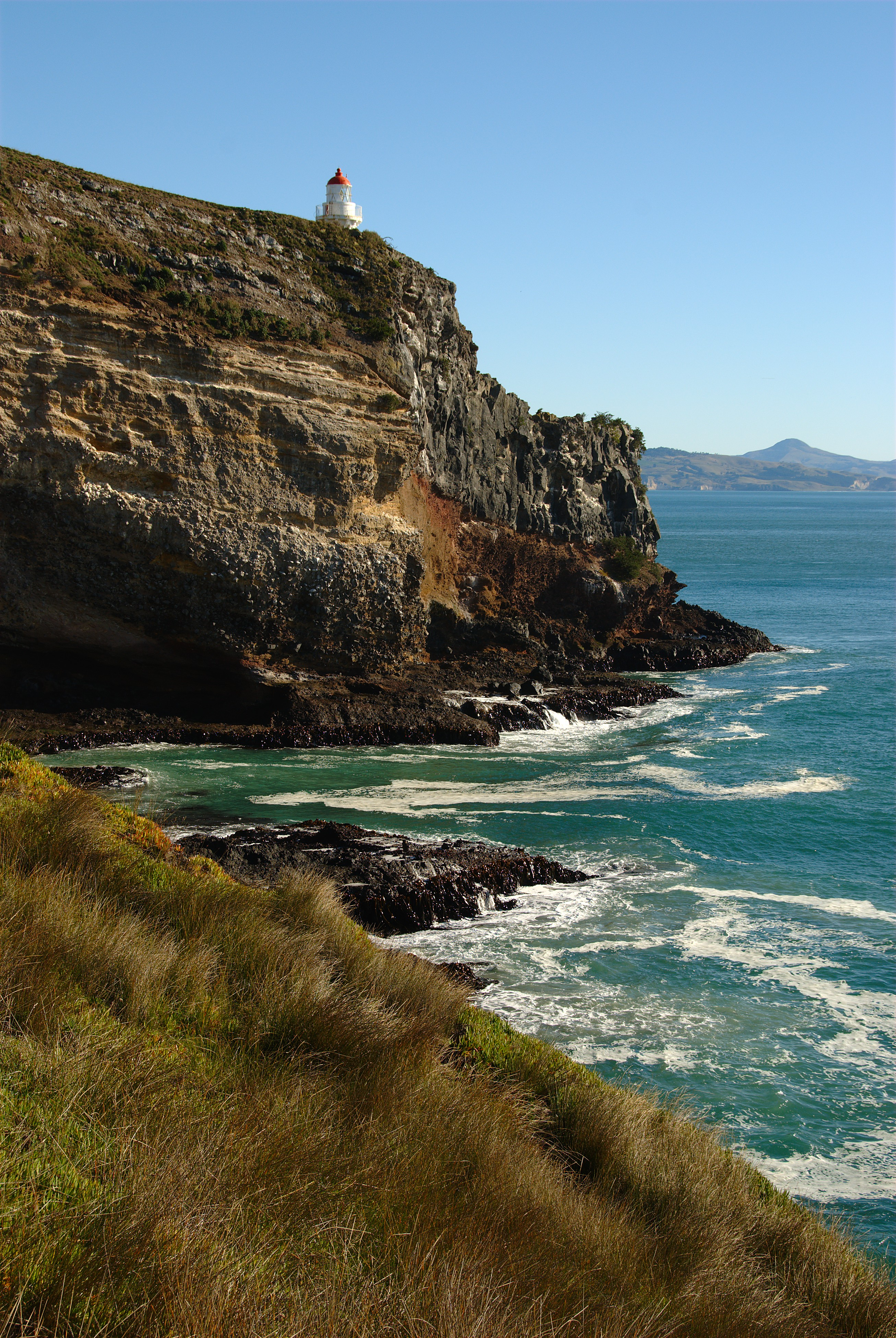
Taiaroa Head with lighthouse

The Dunedin City territorial authority has a land area of 3,314.8 km^{2} (1,279.9 sq mi), slightly larger than the American state of Rhode Island or the English county of Cambridgeshire, and a little smaller than Cornwall. It was the largest city in land area in New Zealand until the formation of the 5,600 km^{2} (2,200 sq mi) Auckland Council on 1 November 2010. The Dunedin City Council boundaries since 1989 have extended to Middlemarch in the west, Waikouaiti in the north, the Pacific Ocean in the east and south-east, and the Waipori/Taieri River and the township of Henley in the south-west.

Dunedin is situated at the head of Otago Harbour, a narrow inlet extending south-westward for some 15 miles. The harbour is a recent creation formed by the flooding of two river valleys. From the time of its foundation in 1848, the city has spread slowly over the low-lying flats and nearby hills and across the isthmus to the slopes of the Otago Peninsula.

=== Geology ===
Eastern Otago is tectonically stable, meaning that it does not experience many earthquakes. One of the few known faults near Dunedin is the Akatore Fault. The first earthquake to cause widespread damage in Dunedin since its founding was the 1974 Dunedin earthquake, which had a magnitude of 4.9 and caused about $3.5 million in damages (2024 terms).

=== Inner city ===
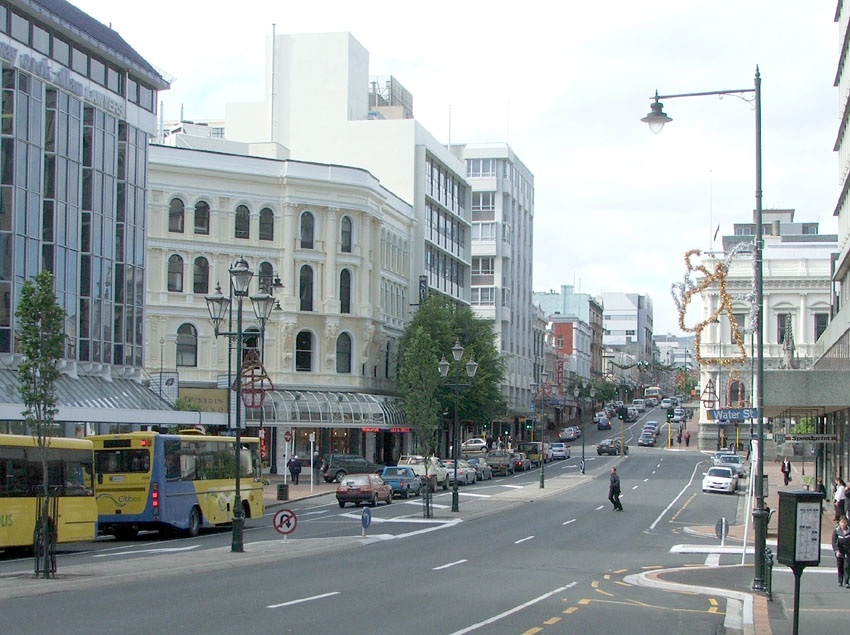
Princes Street was developed during Dunedin's 1860s boom from the gold rush, and consequently is one of New Zealand's most historic streets

The central region of Dunedin is known as the Octagon. It was once a gully, filled in the mid-nineteenth century to create the present plaza. The initial settlement of the city took place to the south on the other side of Bell Hill, a large outcrop which had to be reduced to provide easy access between the two parts of the settlement. The central city stretches away from this point in a largely northeast–southwest direction, with the main streets of George Street and Princes Street meeting at The Octagon. Here they are joined by Stuart Street, which runs orthogonally to them, from the Dunedin Railway Station in the southeast, and steeply up to the suburb of Roslyn in the northwest. Many of the city's notable old buildings are located in the southern part of this area and on the inner ring of lower hills which surround the central city (most of these hills, such as Maori Hill, Pine Hill, and Maryhill, rise to some 200 metres [660 ft] above the plain). The head of the harbour includes a large area of reclaimed land ("The Southern Endowment"), much of which is used for light industry and warehousing. A large area of flat land, simply known colloquially as "The Flat" lies to the south and southwest of the city centre, and includes several larger and older suburbs, notably South Dunedin and St Kilda. These are protected from the Pacific Ocean by a long line of dunes which run east–west along the city's southern coastline and separate residential areas from Ocean Beach, which is traditionally divided into St. Clair Beach at the western end and St Kilda Beach to the east.

Dunedin is home to Baldwin Street, which, according to the Guinness Book of Records, is the steepest street in the world. Its gradient is 1 in 2.9. The long-since-abandoned Maryhill Cablecar route had a similar gradient close to its Mornington depot.

Beyond the inner range of hills lie Dunedin's outer suburbs, notably to the northwest, beyond Roslyn. This direction contains Taieri Road and Three Mile Hill, which between them formed the original road route to the Taieri Plains. The modern State Highway 1 follows a different route, passing through Caversham in the west and out past Saddle Hill. Lying between Saddle Hill and Caversham are the outer suburbs of Green Island and Abbotsford. Between Green Island and Roslyn lies the steep-sided valley of the Kaikorai Stream, which is today a residential and light industrial area. Suburban settlements—mostly regarded as separate townships—also lie along both edges of the Otago Harbour. Notable among these are Portobello and Macandrew Bay, on the Otago Peninsula coast, and Port Chalmers on the opposite side of the harbour. Port Chalmers provides Dunedin's main deep-water port, including the city's container port.

The Dunedin skyline is dominated by a ring of (traditionally seven) hills which form the remnants of a volcanic crater. Notable among them are Mount Cargill (700 m [2,300 ft]), Flagstaff (680 m [2,230 ft]), Saddle Hill (480 m [1,570 ft]), Signal Hill (390 m [1,280 ft]), and Harbour Cone (320 m [1,050 ft]).

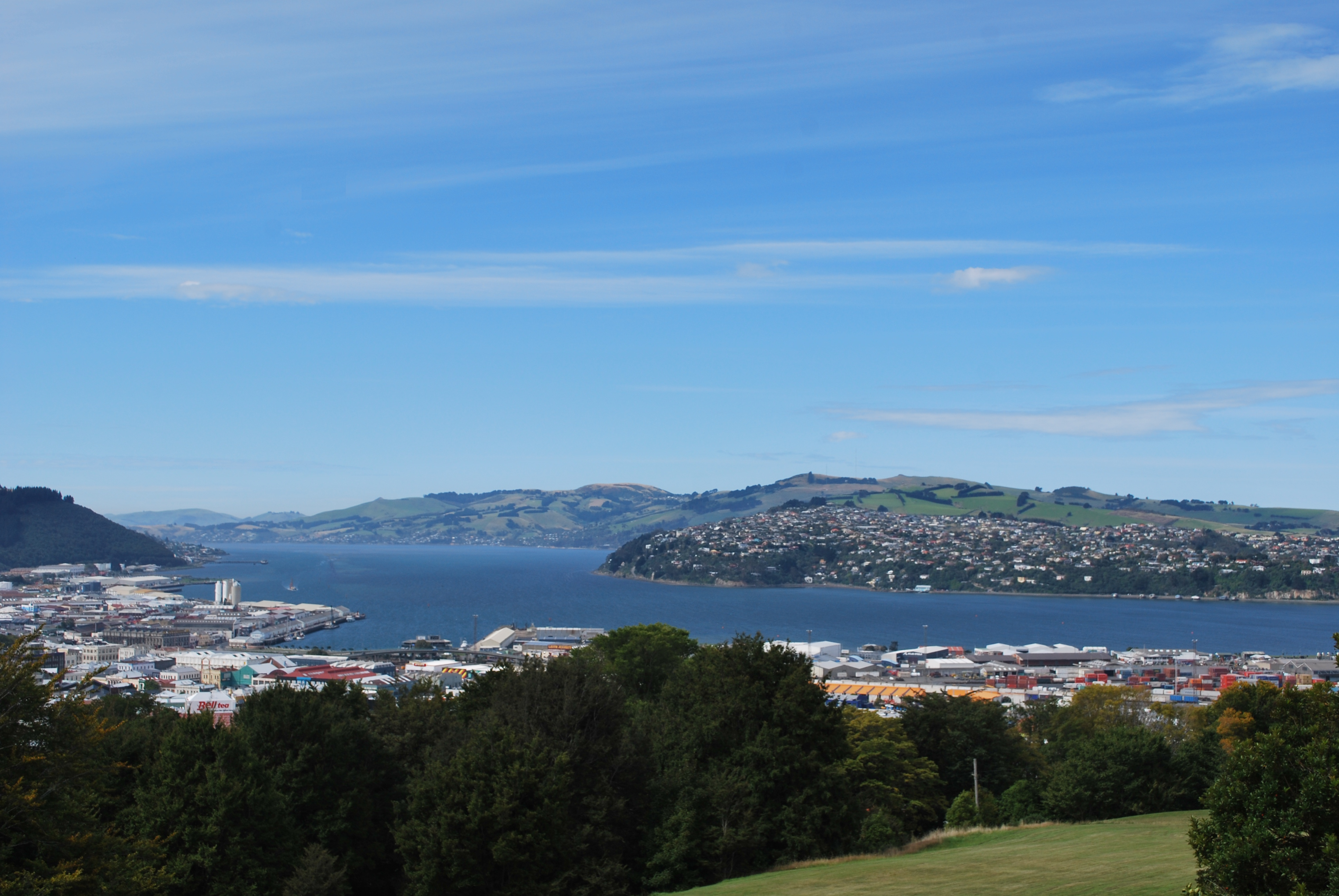
Dunedin seen from Unity Park lookout in the suburb of Mornington

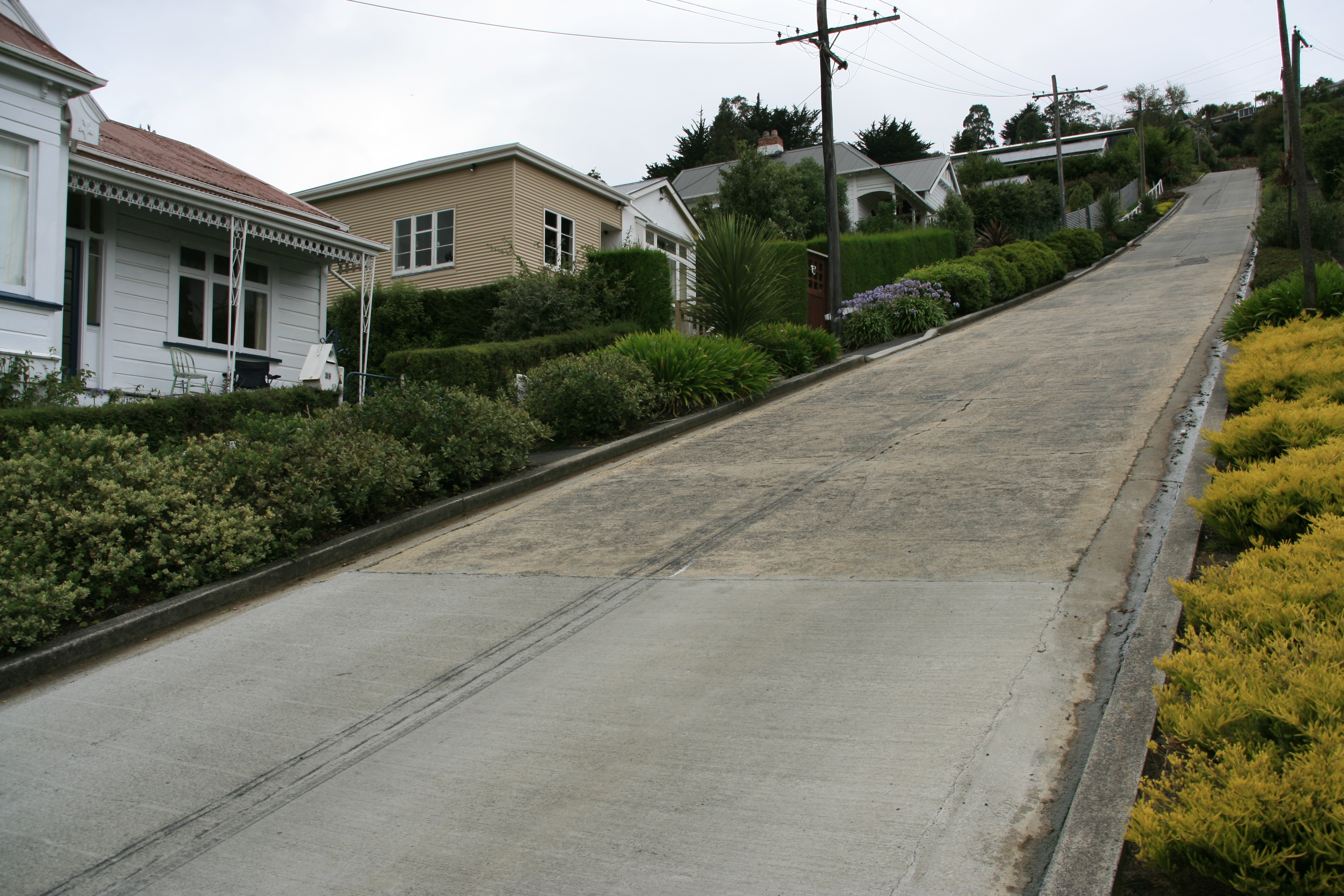
Baldwin Street in North East Valley is the world's steepest residential street

=== Hinterland ===
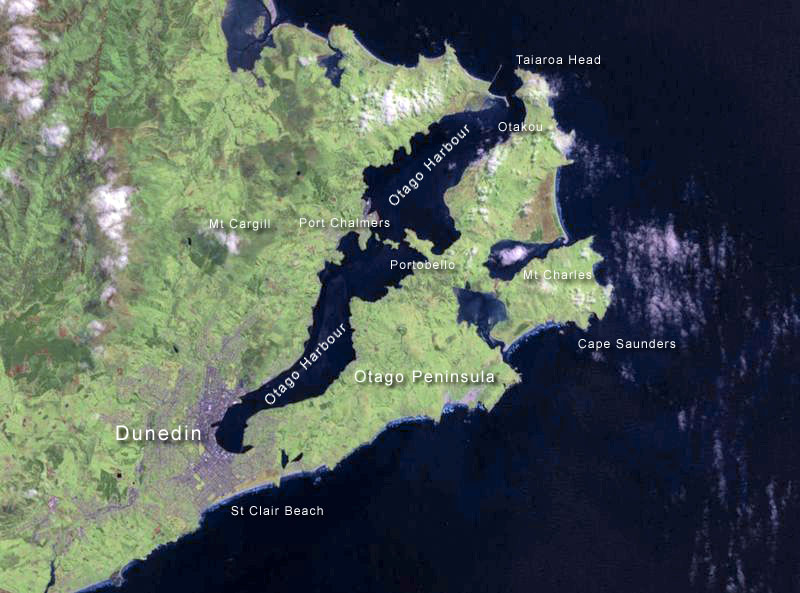
Dunedin (grey area to lower left) sits close to the isthmus of the Otago Peninsula, at the end of Otago Harbour

Dunedin's hinterland encompasses a variety of different landforms. To the southwest lie the Taieri Plains, the broad, fertile lowland floodplains of the Taieri River and its major tributary, the Waipori. These are moderately heavily settled, and contain the towns of Mosgiel, and Allanton. They are separated from the coast by a range of low hills rising to some 300 metres (980 ft). Inland from the Taieri Plain is rough hill country. Close to the plain, much of this is forested, notably around Berwick and Lake Mahinerangi, and also around the Silverpeaks Range which lies northwest of the Dunedin urban area. Beyond this, the land becomes drier and opens out into grass and tussock-covered land. A high, broad valley, the Strath-Taieri lies in Dunedin's far northwest, containing the town of Middlemarch, one of the area's few concentrations of population.

To the north of the city's urban area is undulating hill country containing several small, mainly coastal, settlements, including Waitati, Warrington, Seacliff, and Waikouaiti. State Highway 1 winds steeply through a series of hills here, notably The Kilmog. These hills can be considered a coastal extension of the Silverpeaks Range.

=== Environment and ecotourism ===
To the east of Dunedin lies the entirety of the Otago Peninsula, a long finger of land that formed the southeastern rim of the Dunedin Volcano. The peninsula is lightly settled, almost entirely along the harbour coast, and much of it is maintained as a natural habitat by the Otago Peninsula Trust. The peninsula contains several fine beaches, and is home to a considerable number of rare species, including yellow-eyed and little penguins, seals, and shags. Taiaroa Head, on the peninsula's northeastern point, is a site of global ecological significance, as it is home to the world's only mainland breeding colony of royal albatross.

=== List of suburbs ===
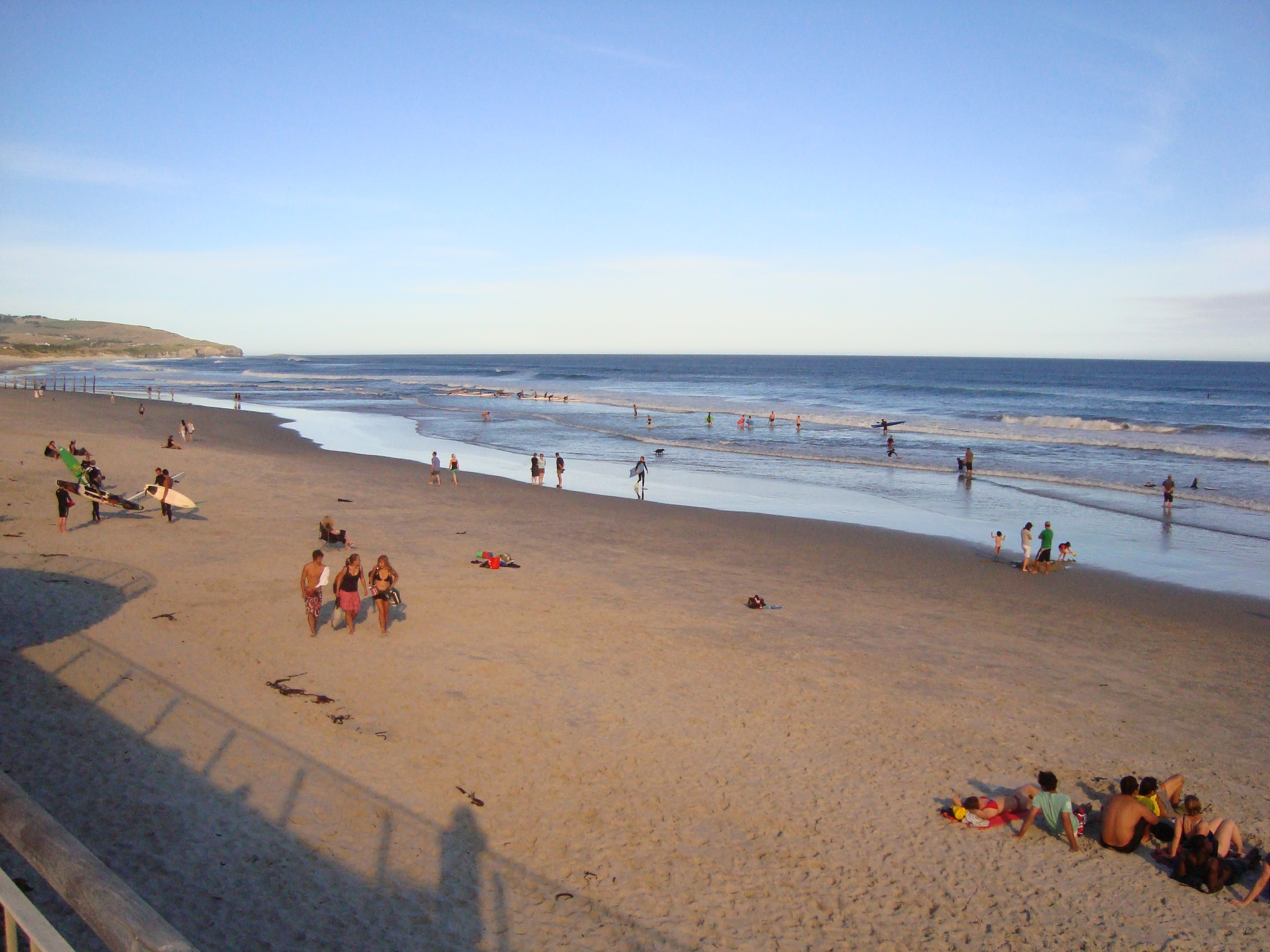
Beach in the suburb of St Clair

Inner suburbs

(clockwise from the city centre, starting at due north)
Woodhaugh; Glenleith; Leith Valley; Dalmore; Liberton; Pine Hill; Normanby; Mt Mera; North East Valley; Opoho; Dunedin North; Ravensbourne; Highcliff; Shiel Hill; Challis; Waverley; Vauxhall; Ocean Grove (Tomahawk); Tainui; Andersons Bay; Musselburgh; South Dunedin; St Kilda; St Clair; Corstorphine; Kew; Forbury; Caversham; Concord; Maryhill; Kenmure; Mornington; Kaikorai Valley; City Rise; Belleknowes; Roslyn; Kaikorai; Wakari; Maori Hill.

Outer suburbs

(clockwise from the city centre, starting at due north)
Burkes; Saint Leonards; Deborah Bay; Careys Bay; Port Chalmers; Sawyers Bay; Roseneath; Broad Bay; Company Bay; Macandrew Bay; Portobello; Burnside; Green Island; Waldronville; Westwood; Saddle Hill; Sunnyvale; Fairfield; Abbotsford; Bradford; Brockville; Halfway Bush; Helensburgh.

==== Towns within city limits ====
(clockwise from the city centre, starting at due north)
Waitati; Waikouaiti; Karitane; Seacliff; Warrington; Pūrākaunui; Long Beach; Aramoana; Ōtākou; Mosgiel; Brighton; Taieri Mouth; Henley; Allanton; East Taieri; Momona; Outram; West Taieri; Waipori; Middlemarch; Hyde.

Since local council reorganisation in the late 1980s, these are suburbs, but are not commonly regarded as such.

=== Climate ===
The climate of Dunedin in general is temperate. Under the Köppen climate classification, Dunedin features an oceanic climate. This leads to mild summers and coolish winters. Winter is not particularly frosty with around 49 frosts per year, lower than most other South Island locations, but sunny. Snowfall is not particularly common and significant snowfall is uncommon (perhaps every two or three years), except in the inland hill suburbs such as Halfway Bush and Wakari, which tend to receive a few days of snowfall each year. Spring can feature "four seasons in a day" weather, but from November to April it is generally settled and mild. Temperatures during summer can reach 30 °C (86 °F). Due to its maritime influence, Dunedin's mild summers and mild winters both stand out considering its latitude.

Dunedin has relatively low rainfall in comparison to many of New Zealand's cities, with usually only between 600 and 750 millimetres (30 in) recorded per year. However, wet weather is frequent, since much of this rainfall occurs in drizzle or light rain and heavy rain is relatively rare. Dunedin is one of the cloudiest major centres in the country, recording approximately 1,850 hours of bright sunshine per annum. Prevailing wind in the city is mainly a sometimes cool southwesterly and during late spring will alternate with northeasterlies. Warmer, dry northwest winds are also characteristic Foehn winds from the northwest. The circle of hills surrounding the inner city shelters the inner city from much of the prevailing weather, while hills just to the west of the city can often push inclement weather around to the west of the city.

Inland, beyond the heart of the city and into inland Otago, the climate is sub-continental: winters are quite cold and dry, summers warm and dry. Thick freezing ground fogs are common in winter in the upper reaches of the Taieri River's course around Middlemarch, and in summer, the temperature occasionally reaches 30 °C (86 °F).

Climate data for Dunedin (1991–2020 normals, extremes 1947–present)
Month	Jan	Feb	Mar	Apr	May	Jun	Jul	Aug	Sep	Oct	Nov	Dec	Year
Record high °C (°F)	35.7 (96.3)	34.6 (94.3)	31.1 (88.0)	29.5 (85.1)	25.7 (78.3)	20.6 (69.1)	20.3 (68.5)	21.7 (71.1)	25.6 (78.1)	31.0 (87.8)	31.3 (88.3)	34.5 (94.1)	35.7 (96.3)
Mean daily maximum °C (°F)	18.9 (66.0)	18.7 (65.7)	17.6 (63.7)	15.4 (59.7)	13.2 (55.8)	10.8 (51.4)	10.4 (50.7)	11.4 (52.5)	13.3 (55.9)	14.9 (58.8)	16.1 (61.0)	17.5 (63.5)	14.9 (58.7)
Daily mean °C (°F)	15.2 (59.4)	15.1 (59.2)	13.9 (57.0)	11.8 (53.2)	9.6 (49.3)	7.4 (45.3)	6.7 (44.1)	7.8 (46.0)	9.5 (49.1)	11.0 (51.8)	12.3 (54.1)	14.0 (57.2)	11.2 (52.1)
Mean daily minimum °C (°F)	11.6 (52.9)	11.5 (52.7)	10.2 (50.4)	8.2 (46.8)	6.1 (43.0)	3.9 (39.0)	3.0 (37.4)	4.2 (39.6)	5.7 (42.3)	7.0 (44.6)	8.5 (47.3)	10.4 (50.7)	7.5 (45.6)
Record low °C (°F)	2.2 (36.0)	2.0 (35.6)	1.0 (33.8)	−1.2 (29.8)	−4.5 (23.9)	−8.0 (17.6)	−3.3 (26.1)	−3.7 (25.3)	−6.5 (20.3)	−1.1 (30.0)	0.8 (33.4)	2.9 (37.2)	−8.0 (17.6)
Average rainfall mm (inches)	70.5 (2.78)	69.9 (2.75)	53.9 (2.12)	60.8 (2.39)	63.6 (2.50)	58.5 (2.30)	51.7 (2.04)	54.7 (2.15)	47.1 (1.85)	60.1 (2.37)	62.5 (2.46)	70.8 (2.79)	724.1 (28.5)
Average rainy days (≥ 1.0 mm)	9.1	7.5	7.6	8.0	9.7	8.5	7.8	8.7	8.2	10.5	9.6	10.4	105.6
Average relative humidity (%)	73.7	76.5	78.2	77.1	80.2	79.7	79.0	78.2	69.7	70.2	69.8	72.4	75.4
Mean monthly sunshine hours	182.1	167.5	165.1	131.5	112.7	95.9	114.8	122.0	147.4	175.6	176.3	184.6	1,775.5
Mean daily daylight hours	15.3	14.0	12.4	10.8	9.4	8.7	9.1	10.3	11.8	13.4	14.9	15.7	12.1
Percentage possible sunshine	38	42	43	41	39	37	41	38	42	42	39	38	40
Source 1: NIWA
Source 2: Weather Spark

Climate data for Dunedin Airport (1991–2020 normals, extremes 1962–present)
Month	Jan	Feb	Mar	Apr	May	Jun	Jul	Aug	Sep	Oct	Nov	Dec	Year
Record high °C (°F)	35.7 (96.3)	34.9 (94.8)	32.2 (90.0)	27.3 (81.1)	26.5 (79.7)	20.8 (69.4)	21.1 (70.0)	22.2 (72.0)	25.0 (77.0)	31.0 (87.8)	31.3 (88.3)	33.1 (91.6)	35.7 (96.3)
Mean maximum °C (°F)	30.0 (86.0)	29.7 (85.5)	28.1 (82.6)	24.1 (75.4)	21.2 (70.2)	17.3 (63.1)	17.0 (62.6)	18.8 (65.8)	22.1 (71.8)	24.9 (76.8)	26.2 (79.2)	29.0 (84.2)	31.8 (89.2)
Mean daily maximum °C (°F)	21.1 (70.0)	20.9 (69.6)	19.5 (67.1)	16.6 (61.9)	13.7 (56.7)	10.8 (51.4)	10.5 (50.9)	12.2 (54.0)	14.6 (58.3)	16.3 (61.3)	17.8 (64.0)	19.8 (67.6)	16.2 (61.1)
Daily mean °C (°F)	15.3 (59.5)	15.0 (59.0)	13.3 (55.9)	10.6 (51.1)	8.0 (46.4)	5.5 (41.9)	4.9 (40.8)	6.5 (43.7)	8.8 (47.8)	10.4 (50.7)	12.1 (53.8)	14.2 (57.6)	10.4 (50.7)
Mean daily minimum °C (°F)	9.5 (49.1)	9.1 (48.4)	7.2 (45.0)	4.7 (40.5)	2.3 (36.1)	0.2 (32.4)	−0.7 (30.7)	0.9 (33.6)	3.0 (37.4)	4.6 (40.3)	6.4 (43.5)	8.5 (47.3)	4.6 (40.4)
Mean minimum °C (°F)	2.9 (37.2)	2.5 (36.5)	0.4 (32.7)	−2.1 (28.2)	−4.3 (24.3)	−5.9 (21.4)	−6.6 (20.1)	−5.2 (22.6)	−3.4 (25.9)	−1.6 (29.1)	0.3 (32.5)	1.9 (35.4)	−7.0 (19.4)
Record low °C (°F)	−0.3 (31.5)	−0.9 (30.4)	−1.9 (28.6)	−4.5 (23.9)	−8.8 (16.2)	−8.6 (16.5)	−8.8 (16.2)	−7.6 (18.3)	−6.5 (20.3)	−5.2 (22.6)	−2.1 (28.2)	−0.9 (30.4)	−8.8 (16.2)
Average rainfall mm (inches)	66.8 (2.63)	64.2 (2.53)	48.4 (1.91)	50.9 (2.00)	59.1 (2.33)	49.4 (1.94)	39.6 (1.56)	40.8 (1.61)	40.7 (1.60)	59.5 (2.34)	54.5 (2.15)	68.5 (2.70)	642.4 (25.3)
Source: CliFlo

== Demographics ==
The Dunedin City territorial authority has a population of 132,800 as of June 2025. This comprises 104,000 people in the Dunedin urban area, 15,100 people in the Mosgiel urban area, 1,470 people in Brighton, 1,310 people in Waikouaiti, and 10,920 people in the surrounding settlements and rural area.

Historical population for the territorial area
Year	Pop.	±% p.a.
2006	118,683	—
2013	120,249	+0.19%
2018	126,255	+0.98%
2023	128,901	+0.42%

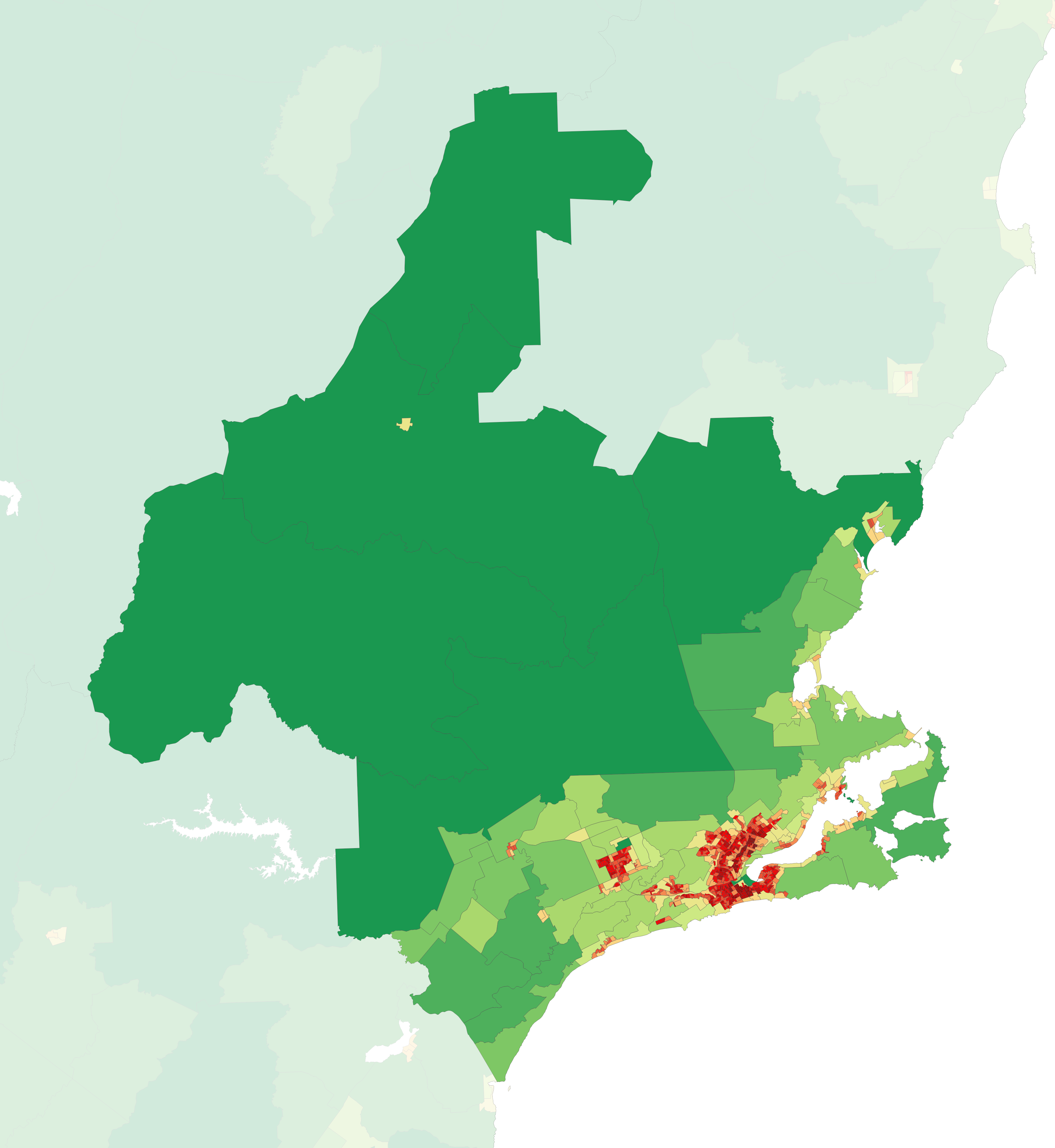
Population density in the 2023 census

Dunedin City had a population of 128,901 in the 2023 New Zealand census, an increase of 2,646 people (2.1%) since the 2018 census, and an increase of 8,652 people (7.2%) since the 2013 census. There were 61,722 males, 66,300 females and 873 people of other genders in 49,920 dwellings. 5.8% of people identified as LGBTIQ+. The median age was 37.0 years (compared with 38.1 years nationally). There were 19,056 people (14.8%) aged under 15 years, 34,455 (26.7%) aged 15 to 29, 53,055 (41.2%) aged 30 to 64, and 22,329 (17.3%) aged 65 or older.

People could identify as more than one ethnicity. The results were 85.1% European (Pākehā); 10.8% Māori; 3.9% Pasifika; 9.3% Asian; 1.7% Middle Eastern, Latin American and African New Zealanders (MELAA); and 2.6% other, which includes people giving their ethnicity as "New Zealander". English was spoken by 97.6%, Māori language by 2.3%, Samoan by 0.8% and other languages by 12.0%. No language could be spoken by 1.6% (e.g. too young to talk). New Zealand Sign Language was known by 0.5%. The percentage of people born overseas was 21.1%, compared with 28.8% nationally.

Religious affiliations were 27.6% Christian, 1.0% Hindu, 1.2% Islam, 0.3% Māori religious beliefs, 0.7% Buddhist, 0.6% New Age, 0.1% Jewish, and 1.5% other religions. People who answered that they had no religion were 60.5%, and 6.6% of people did not answer the census question.

Of those at least 15 years old, 24,159 (22.0%) people had a bachelor's or higher degree, 58,182 (53.0%) had a post-high school certificate or diploma, and 20,418 (18.6%) people exclusively held high school qualifications. The median income was $33,500, compared with $41,500 nationally. 9,825 people (8.9%) earned over $100,000 compared to 12.1% nationally. The employment status of those at least 15 was that 48,852 (44.5%) people were employed full-time, 17,673 (16.1%) were part-time, and 3,528 (3.2%) were unemployed.

=== Urban area ===
The Dunedin urban area covers 91.16 km^{2} (35.20 sq mi) and had an estimated population of 104,000 as of June 2025, with a population density of 1,141 people per km^{2}.

Historical population for the urban area
Year	Pop.	±% p.a.
2013	95,901	—
2018	99,885	+0.82%
2023	100,908	+0.20%

The urban area had a population of 100,908 in the 2023 New Zealand census, an increase of 1,023 people (1.0%) since the 2018 census, and an increase of 5,007 people (5.2%) since the 2013 census. There were 48,096 males, 52,020 females and 792 people of other genders in 38,127 dwellings. 6.7% of people identified as LGBTIQ+. The median age was 34.1 years (compared with 38.1 years nationally). There were 14,475 people (14.3%) aged under 15 years, 30,684 (30.4%) aged 15 to 29, 40,515 (40.2%) aged 30 to 64, and 15,234 (15.1%) aged 65 or older.

People could identify as more than one ethnicity. The results were 83.0% European (Pākehā); 11.2% Māori; 4.5% Pasifika; 10.9% Asian; 2.0% Middle Eastern, Latin American and African New Zealanders (MELAA); and 2.5% other, which includes people giving their ethnicity as "New Zealander". English was spoken by 97.5%, Māori language by 2.5%, Samoan by 0.9% and other languages by 13.6%. No language could be spoken by 1.6% (e.g. too young to talk). New Zealand Sign Language was known by 0.5%. The percentage of people born overseas was 23.0, compared with 28.8% nationally.

Religious affiliations were 27.1% Christian, 1.2% Hindu, 1.4% Islam, 0.3% Māori religious beliefs, 0.8% Buddhist, 0.6% New Age, 0.1% Jewish, and 1.7% other religions. People who answered that they had no religion were 60.6%, and 6.4% of people did not answer the census question.

Of those at least 15 years old, 20,169 (23.3%) people had a bachelor's or higher degree, 45,513 (52.7%) had a post-high school certificate or diploma, and 14,928 (17.3%) people exclusively held high school qualifications. The median income was $31,800, compared with $41,500 nationally. 7,266 people (8.4%) earned over $100,000 compared to 12.1% nationally. The employment status of those at least 15 was that 37,755 (43.7%) people were employed full-time, 14,250 (16.5%) were part-time, and 3,099 (3.6%) were unemployed.

== Culture ==
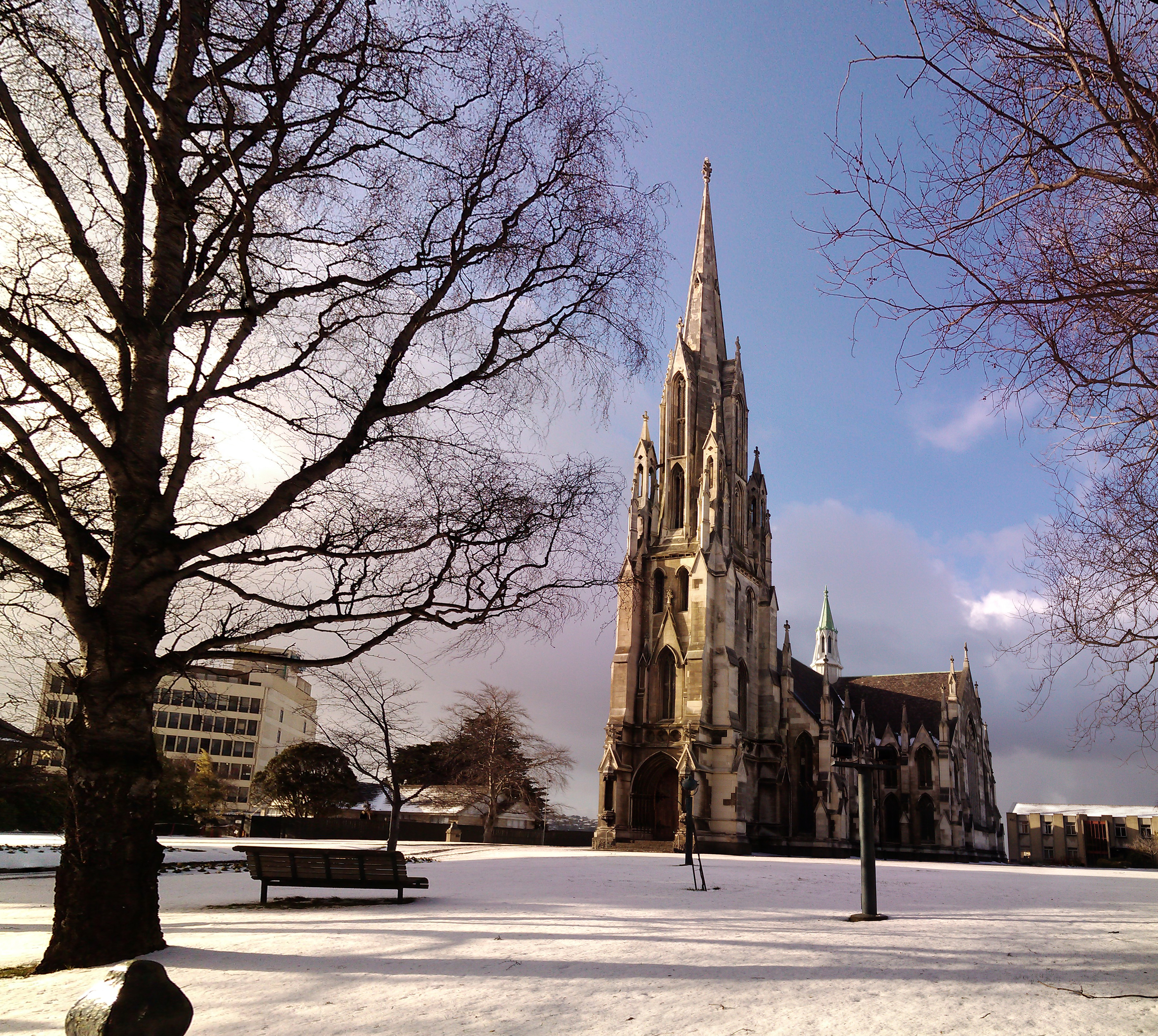
First Church of Otago

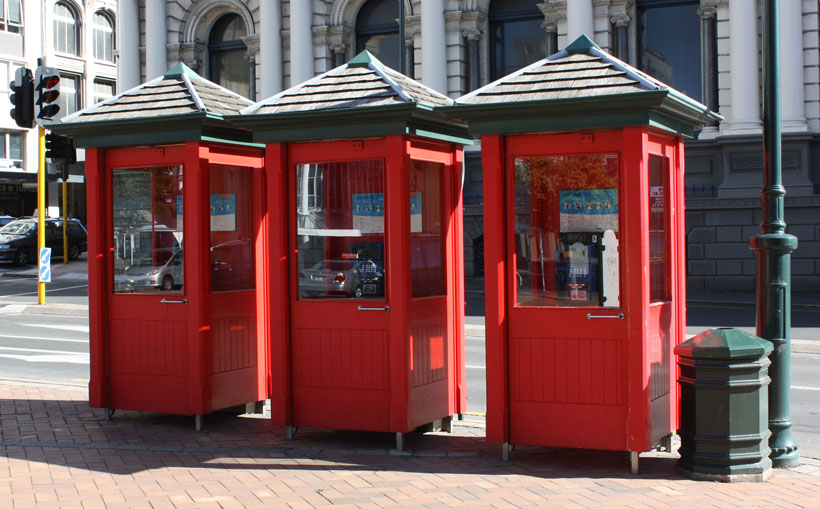
Phone booths in Central Dunedin

=== Literature ===
In December 2014, Dunedin was designated as a UNESCO Creative City of Literature. Mayor of Dunedin Dave Cull said at the time, "This announcement puts our city on the world map as a first-class literary city. We keep honourable company; other cities bestowed with City of Literature status include Edinburgh, Dublin, Iowa City, Melbourne, Reykjavík, Norwich and Kraków."

Dunedin's application was driven by a steering committee and an advisory board of writers, librarians and academics from a range of Dunedin institutions. The bid highlighted the quality of the city's considerable literary heritage, its diverse combination of literary events, businesses, institutions and organisations, plus its thriving community of writers, playwrights and lyricists.

UNESCO established the Creative Cities Network to develop international co-operation among cities and encourage them to drive joint development partnerships in line with UNESCO's global priorities of 'culture and development' and 'sustainable development'. Each city in the network reflects one of UNESCO's seven Creative City themes: folk art, gastronomy, literature, design, film or music. Dunedin is New Zealand's first city to be appointed to the Creative City network.

Paul Theroux described Dunedin as "cold and frugal with its shabby streets and mock-gothic university". The university students he described as "ignorant, assertive and dirty". Billy Connolly described Dunedin as "a dreary town. It's got that Scottish Presbyterian feel about it". Michael Palin in Full Circle says of Dunedin "at first glance it is a dour, damp, chilly place, its buildings heavy with ponderous Presbyterian pride...but beneath a grey and sober heart there lurks a wild heart." In 1895, Mark Twain said of the Scots who settled in Dunedin, "They stopped here on their way from home to heaven – thinking they had arrived".

=== Music ===
==== Choirs ====
Dunedin is home to many choirs. These include the following:

- The 140-member City of Dunedin Choir is Dunedin's leading performer of large-scale choral works.
- The Southern Consort of Voices is a smaller choir regularly performing Choral Works.
- The Royal Dunedin Male Choir, conducted by Richard Madden, performs two concerts a year
- The Dunedin RSA Choir regularly performs concerts and has played an important and valued role in Dunedin City's commemorative celebrations of significant historical events. ANZAC, of course, is one such occasion, and the ANZAC Revue held on the evening of every ANZAC Day, occupies a special place of honour in the choir's calendar.
- The all-female Dunedin Harmony Chorus are an important part of the Dunedin culture.
- The Southern Children's Choir, based at Marama Hall in the university, is Dunedin's main children's choir. Most schools in Dunedin have choirs, many having more than one.
- The Southern Youth Choir is a concert-based youth choir.
- The University of Otago is home to three official choirs: the two chapel choirs (Knox and Selwyn), and the travelling Cantores choir.
- Several Dunedin Churches and Cathedrals hold choirs. Among these are St. Joseph's Catholic Cathedral, home to two choirs: the Cathedral Choir and the Gabrieli Singers; Knox Church's large mixed gender choir for adults and children, the Knox Church Choir; All Saints' Church, Dunedin, has choral scholars from Selwyn College, Otago, St. John's Church, Roslyn's small mixed-gender parish choir; and St. Paul's Anglican Cathedral's mixed-gender adult choir.
- The Dunedin Red Cross Choir (of New Zealand Red Cross), conducted by Eleanor Moyle, is one of only three Red Cross choirs globally. Established in 1942, this choir performs regularly in Dunedin at various Rest Homes and holds an annual concert at the Kings and Queens Performing Arts Centre.

==== Instrumental classical and jazz ensembles ====
The Dunedin Symphony Orchestra is a semi-professional orchestra based in Dunedin. Other instrumental ensembles include the Rare Byrds early music ensemble, the Collegiate Orchestra, and the Dunedin Youth Orchestra. Many schools also hold school orchestras and bands. There are also three brass bands in Dunedin: St. Kilda Brass, Kaikorai Brass, and Mosgiel Brass. The Otago Symphonic Band and City of Dunedin Pipe Band are also important Dunedin musical ensembles.

==== Popular music ====
Dunedin lends its name to the Dunedin sound, a form of indie rock music which was created in the city in the 1980s. Some Dunedin bands recorded on the Flying Nun Records label, based in Christchurch. Among the bands with Dunedin connections were The Chills, The Clean, The Verlaines, The Bats, Sneaky Feelings, The Dead C and Straitjacket Fits, all of which had significant followings throughout New Zealand and on the college radio circuit in the United States and Europe.

Dunedin has been home to bands since the end of the Dunedin sound era. Six60, Nadia Reid and Julian Temple Band are Dunedin artists.

=== Sport ===
==== Major teams ====
- Highlanders – Super Rugby rugby union team who are the Super Rugby champions of 2015 (represents Otago, Southland and North Otago Rugby Unions)
- Otago Rugby Football Union – Mitre 10 Cup rugby union team
- Otago Volts and Otago Sparks – men's and women's cricket teams
- Southern Steel – ANZ Championship netball team (represents Otago & Southland Netball – Based in Invercargill)
- Southern United – association football team in the New Zealand Football Championship
- Otago Nuggets and Southern Hoiho – Men's and Women's basketball teams competing in the National Basketball League and Tauihi Basketball Aotearoa
- Dunedin Thunder – New Zealand Ice Hockey League team
- Otago Whalers – National Competition Rugby League Team

==== Grounds and stadiums ====
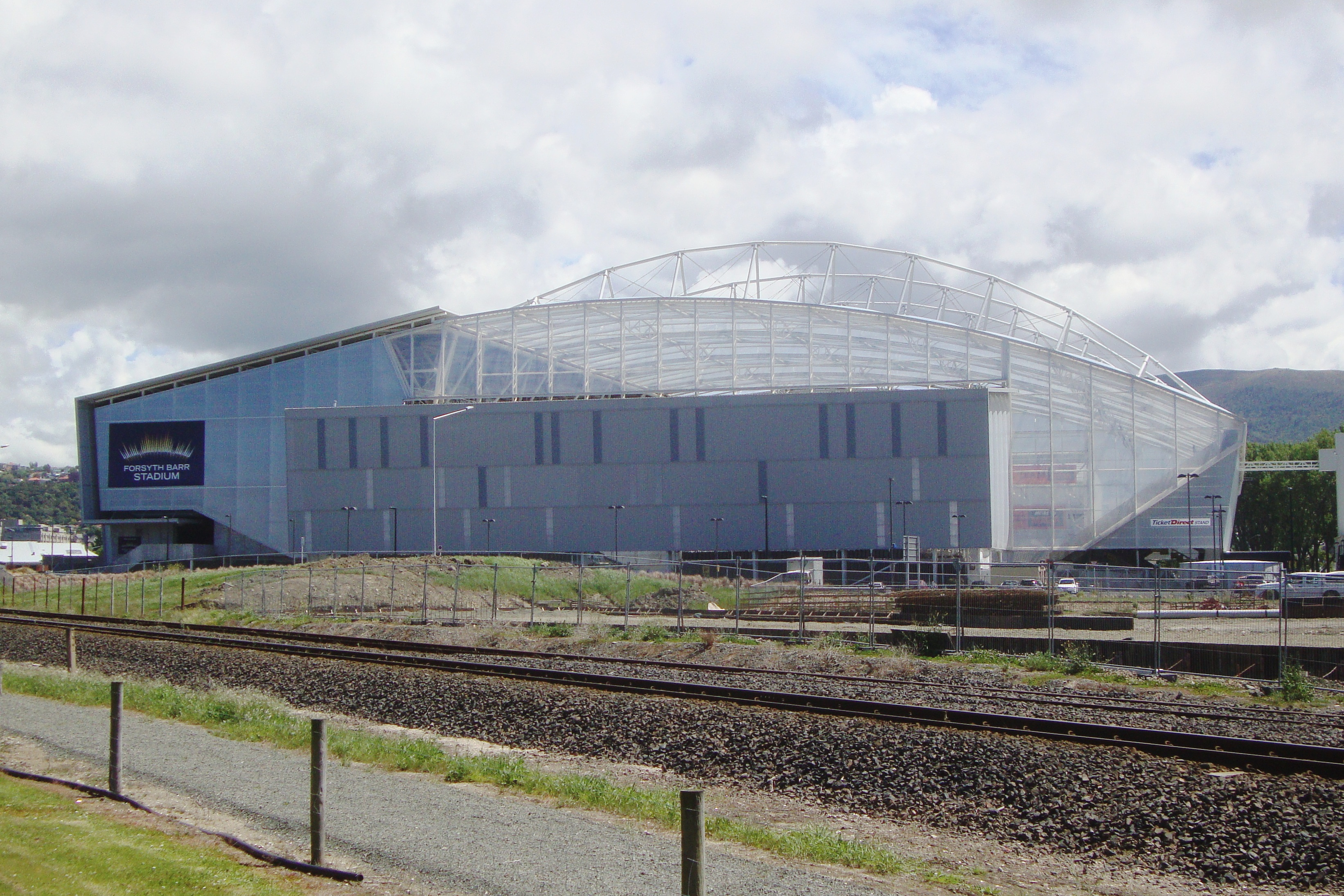
Forsyth Barr Stadium, Dunedin North

- Caledonian Ground
- Carisbrook (now defunct)
- Dunedin Ice Stadium
- The Edgar Centre
- Forsyth Barr Stadium at University Plaza
- Logan Park
- Moana Pool
- Tonga Park
- University Oval – Notable for being the southernmost venue on the planet that hosts Test Cricket.

=== Theatre ===
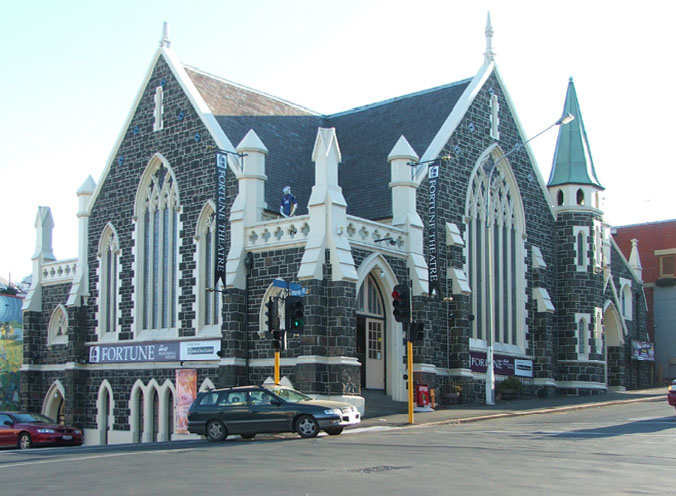
Fortune Theatre laid claim to being the world's southernmost professional theatre company

The city hosts a large theatre venue, the Regent Theatre in the Octagon. Dunedin hosted the world's southernmost professional theatre company, the Fortune Theatre, based in the former Trinity Methodist Church, until it closed in 2018. Smaller theatres in Dunedin include the Globe Theatre, the Mayfair Theatre, the New Athenaeum Theatre, and the Playhouse Theatre.

=== Visual arts ===
Dunedin has a substantial public art gallery, the Dunedin Public Art Gallery, in the Octagon. The city contains numerous other galleries, including over a dozen dealer galleries, many of which are found south of the Octagon along Princes Street, Moray Place and Dowling Street. There are also several more experimental art spaces, notably the Blue Oyster in Dowling Street.

Many notable artists have strong links with Dunedin, among them Ralph Hotere, Frances Hodgkins, Grahame Sydney, and Jeffrey Harris.

=== Marae ===
Dunedin has three marae (meeting grounds) for Ngāi Tahu, each with its own wharenui (meeting house). Ārai-te-uru marae in Wakari includes the Ārai-te-uru wharenui. Ōtākou Marae in Ōtākou includes the Tamatea wharenui. Huirapa / Puketeraki marae in Karitāne includes the Huirapa wharenui.

=== Honours ===
Asteroid 101461 Dunedin discovered by British astronomer Ian P. Griffin in 1998, was named in honour of the city. The official naming citation was published by the Minor Planet Center on 8 November 2019 (M.P.C. 118220).

== Government ==
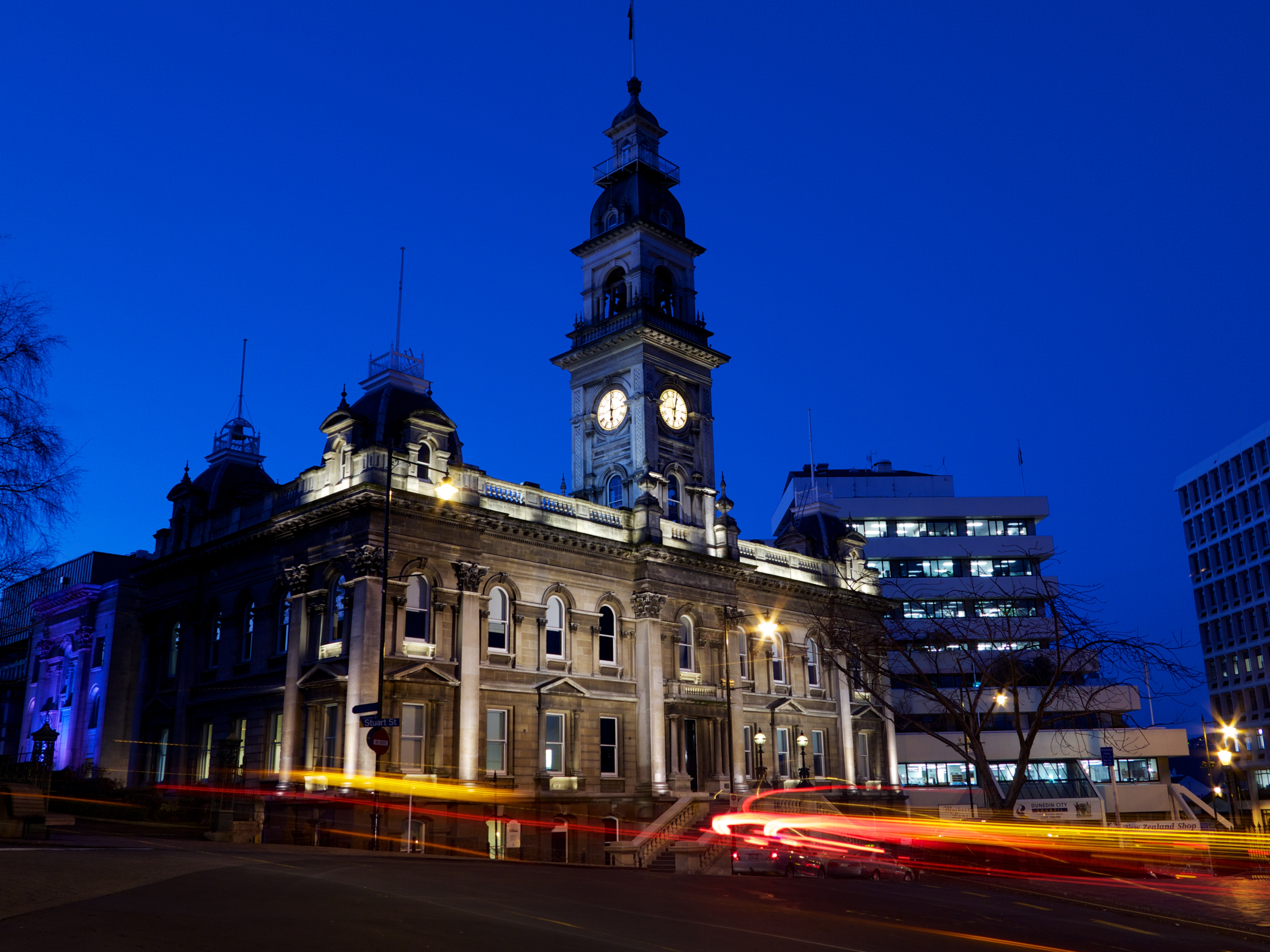
The Dunedin Town Hall

=== Local ===
The Dunedin City Council (DCC) governs the Dunedin City territorial authority. It is made up of an elected mayor (currently Sophie Barker elected 17 October 2025) and fourteen additional councillors elected across three wards, one of whom gets chosen as deputy mayor.

=== National ===
Dunedin is covered by two general electorates, Dunedin and Taieri, and one Māori electorate, Te Tai Tonga.

The city in general is a stronghold of the New Zealand Labour Party, having won the Dunedin-based electorate seats continuously since the 1978 election. As of the 2023 general election, both general electorates are held by the party, with Rachel Brooking representing Dunedin and Ingrid Leary representing Taieri. Te Tai Tonga (which covers the entire South Island and part of Wellington in the North Island) is held by Te Pāti Māori and represented by Tākuta Ferris. Scott Willis and Mark Patterson are both List MPs from the Taieri electorate.

== Media ==
The major daily newspaper is the Otago Daily Times, which is also the country's oldest daily newspaper and part of the Allied Media (formerly Allied Press) group. Weekly and bi-weekly community newspapers include The Star, and the university student magazine Critic Te Ārohi.

The city is served by all major national radio and television stations. The city's main terrestrial television and FM radio transmitter sits atop Mount Cargill, north of the city, while the city's main AM transmitter is located at Highcliff, east of the city centre on the Otago Peninsula. Local radio stations include Radio Dunedin, community station Otago Access Radio (formerly Hills AM, then Toroa Radio), and the university radio station, Radio One.

Television broadcasts began in Dunedin on 31 July 1962 with the launch of channel DNTV2, the last of the four main centres to receive television. In November 1969, DNTV2 was networked with its counterpart stations in Auckland, Wellington and Christchurch to form NZBC TV. In 1975, the NZBC was broken up, with the Wellington and Dunedin studios taking over NZBC TV as Television One (now TVNZ 1) while Auckland and Christchurch studios launched Television Two (now TVNZ 2).

The city had one local television station called Channel 39, which was owned by Allied Press. It closed on Christmas 2025.

The television news broadcaster 1News along with Radio New Zealand and NZME also have bureaus in Dunedin. In May 2021, the former television news broadcaster Newshub's owner Discovery, Inc. announced that it would be closing down its Dunedin bureau as part of a restructuring process.

The city is home to several prominent media-related production companies, notably Natural History New Zealand and Taylormade Media.

The city was once home to the head offices of Radio Otago—now called RadioWorks (part of Mediaworks) and based in Auckland. It was also formerly the home to several now-defunct newspapers, prominent among which were the Otago Witness and the Evening Star.

== Education ==
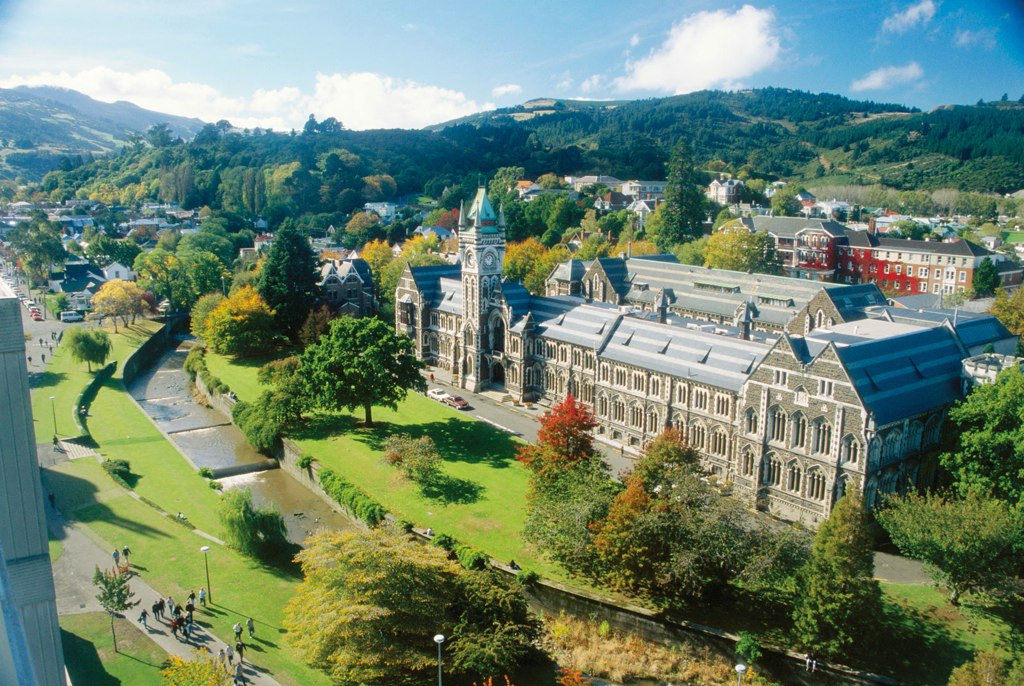
The University of Otago, considered one of the world's most beautiful university campuses

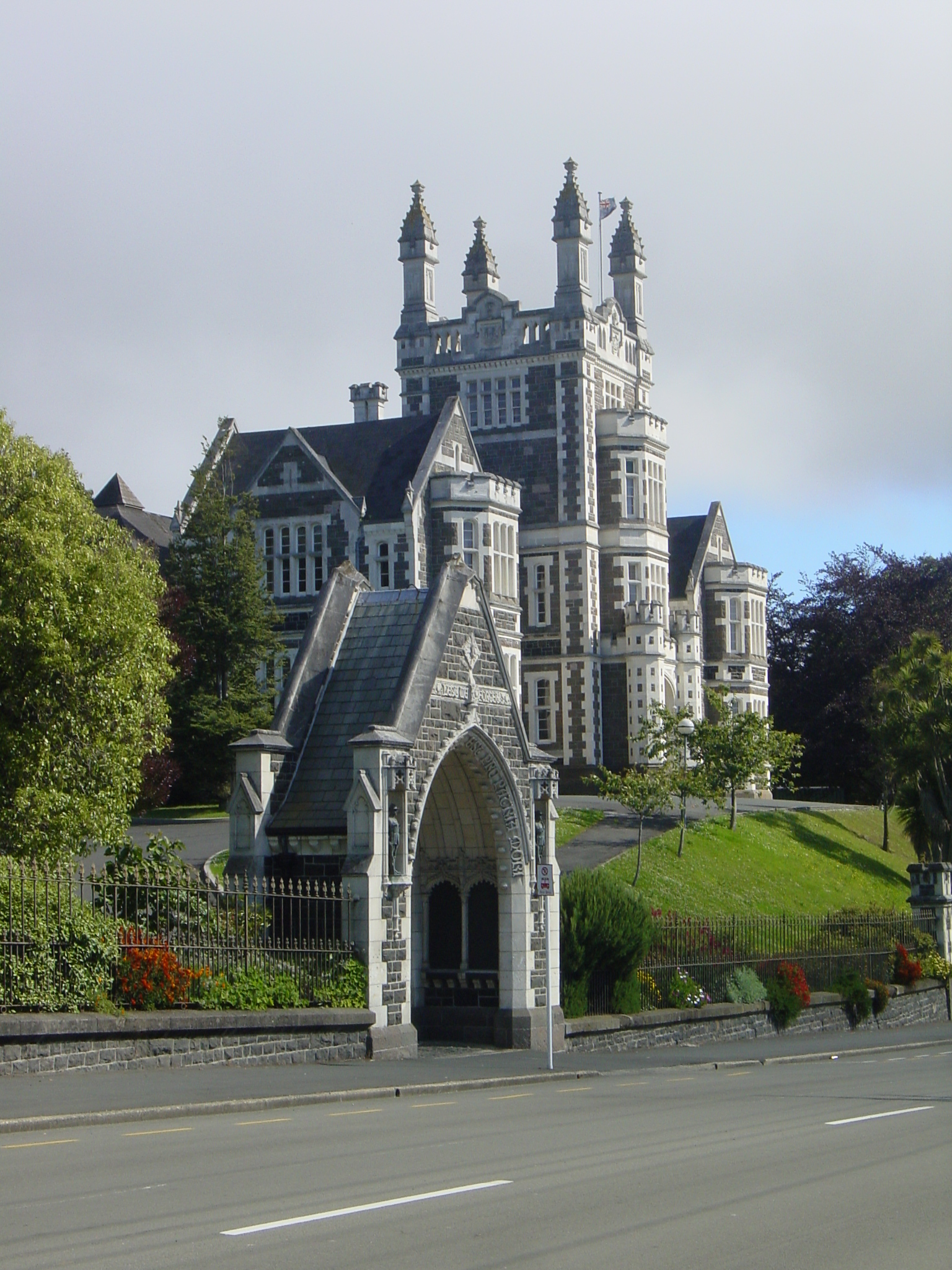
Otago Boys' High School

=== Secondary ===
Dunedin is home to 12 secondary schools: eight state and four state-integrated. The oldest secondary school is state-run Otago Boys' High School, founded in 1863. Its sister school, Otago Girls' High School (1871) is the oldest state girls' secondary school in New Zealand, even though it preceded the state education system by six years.

Other state schools include Bayfield High School, Kaikorai Valley College and Logan Park High School. King's High School and Queen's High School are single-sex schools based in St Clair, and Taieri College in Mosgiel. The four state-integrated schools are Columba College, a Presbyterian girls' school; St. Hilda's Collegiate School, an Anglican girls' school; John McGlashan College, a Presbyterian boys' school; and Trinity Catholic College, a Catholic coeducational school.

=== Tertiary ===
- University of Otago
  - Dunedin College of Education
- Otago Polytechnic

== Infrastructure and services ==
=== Public health and hospitals ===
Dunedin Hospital is the main public hospital in Dunedin. Other hospitals include:

- Mercy Hospital – a private non-profit hospital opened in 1936 and relocated to Maori Hill in 1969
- Wakari Hospital

The Dunedin Hospital and the Wakari Hospital, which are closely related, are operated by Te Whatu Ora. Ambulance services are provided by St John New Zealand.

=== Utilities ===
Aurora Energy owns and operates the electricity distribution network servicing the city and the Taieri plains, while OtagoNet Joint Venture owns and operates the electricity distribution network in the rural areas north and west of the city. Electricity is primarily supplied from Transpower's national grid at two substations: Halfway Bush and South Dunedin, with part to the OtagoNet network also supplied from Transpower's Naseby substation in central Otago.

== Transport ==
=== Road ===
The Dunedin urban area is served by two state highways, with an additional two state highways and one tourist route serving other parts of the district. The main state highway in Dunedin is State Highway 1, which runs in a north to south-west direction through the middle of the city, connecting Dunedin with Invercargill to the south and Timaru and Christchurch to the north. Between The Oval and Mosgiel, State Highway 1 follows the eleven-kilometre Dunedin Southern Motorway. State Highway 88 connects central Dunedin to the city's port facilities at Port Chalmers.

Other State Highways in the city are: State Highway 86 connecting SH 1 at Allanton with Dunedin International Airport, State Highway 87 connecting SH 1 at Kinmont with SH 85 at Kyeburn via Middlemarch, serving the Dunedin city hinterland.

Dunedin is the northeastern terminus of the Southern Scenic Route, a tourist highway connecting Dunedin to Te Anau via The Catlins, Invercargill and Fiordland.

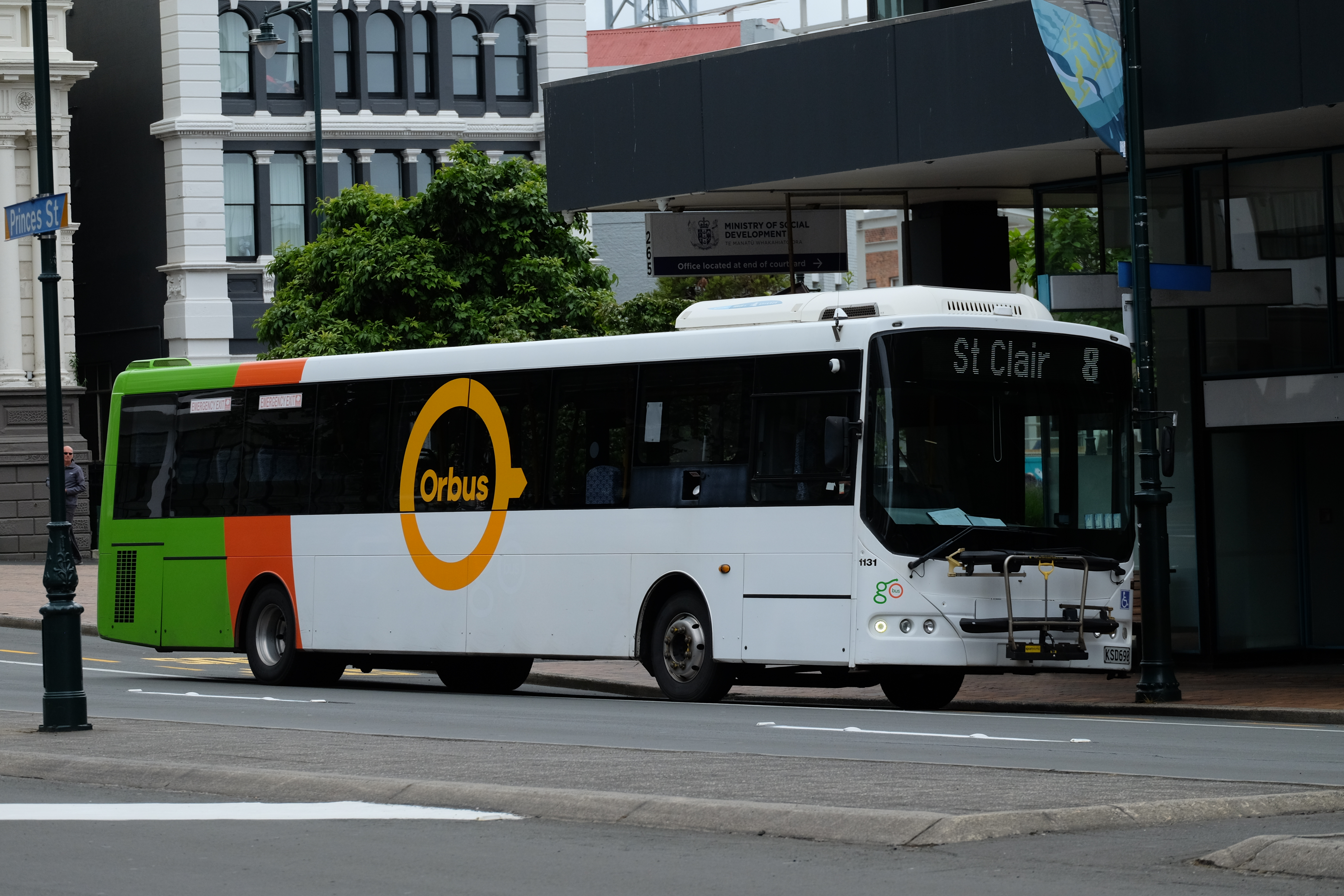
Orbus in Dunedin.

=== Bus ===
Buses in Dunedin are organised by the Otago Regional Council. A total of 64 buses operate on 17 weekday routes and 13 weeknight/weekend/holiday routes across the city. Buses are run by two operators, Ritchies Transport with three routes and Go Bus Transport with the remainder. Dunedin City Council-owned operator Citibus was a major player until 2011 when Passenger Transport (New Zealand) purchased Citibus from Dunedin City Holdings, and both companies were subsequently bought by Go Bus.

=== Rail ===
Dunedin Railway Station, located east of the Octagon, is the city's main railway station. Once the nation's busiest, the decline in rail over the years saw the withdrawal of most services. Suburban services ceased in 1982, and the last regular commercial passenger train to serve Dunedin, The Southerner, was cancelled in February 2002. The Taieri Gorge Railway now operates tourist-oriented services from the station, the most prominent of which is the Taieri Gorge Limited, which operates daily along the former Otago Central Railway through the scenic Taieri Gorge. Taieri Gorge Railway also operates to Palmerston once weekly. The station is also sometimes visited by excursions organised by other heritage railway societies, and by trains chartered by cruise ships docking at Port Chalmers.

=== Air ===
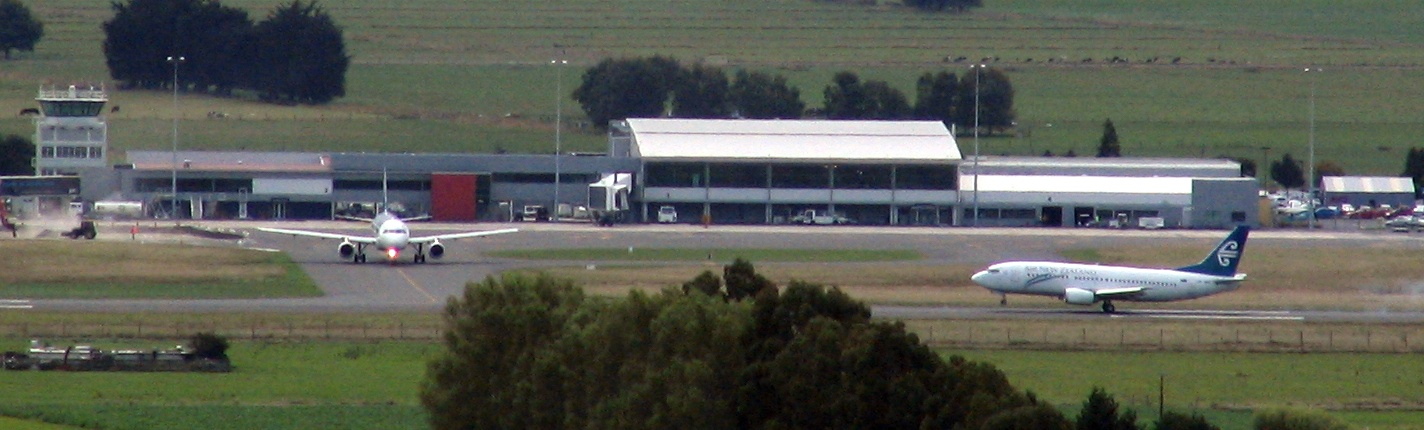
Dunedin International Airport – an Air New Zealand 737 lands on the runway while an Air New Zealand A320 waits on the taxiway

Dunedin International Airport is located 22 km (13.67 mi) southwest of the city, on the Taieri Plains at Momona. The airport operates a single terminal and 1,900-metre (6,200 ft) runway, and is the third-busiest airport in the South Island, after Christchurch and Queenstown. It is primarily used for domestic flights, with regular flights to and from Auckland, Christchurch, Wellington and charter flights to and from Queenstown, Wānaka, and Invercargill, but it also has international flights arriving from and departing to Gold Coast, Queensland year round. In recent years, a decline in international passengers can be attributed to fewer international flights operating direct to the airport.

=== Sea ===
As of 2018, a ferry operates between Port Chalmers and Portobello it started in 2018 and is the first since the early 20th century. Occasional calls have been made to revive them, and a non-profit organisation, Otago Ferries Inc., has been set up to examine the logistics of restoring one of the original ferries and again using it for this route.

In 1866, plans were made for a bridge across the Otago Harbour between Port Chalmers and Portobello, but this grand scheme for an 1140-metre structure never eventuated. Plans were also mooted during the 1870s for a canal between the Pacific coast at Tomahawk and Andersons Bay, close to the head of the harbour. This scheme also never came to fruition.

== Panoramas ==
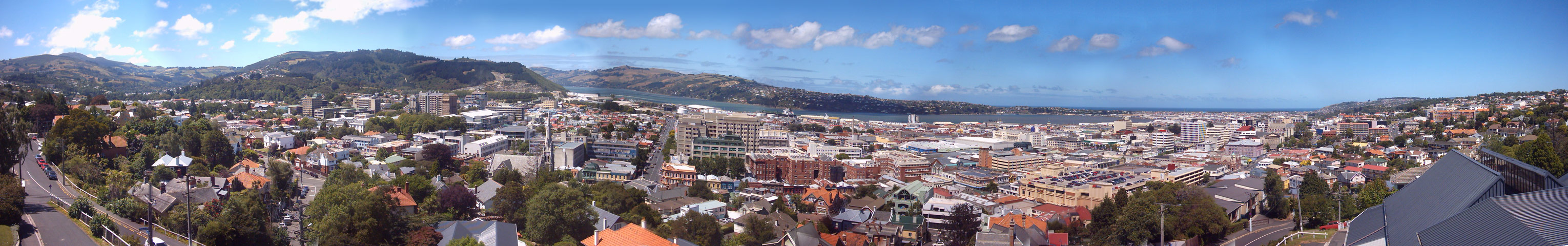
180° view of Dunedin shot from the hills on the west. Mount Cargill is at the extreme left of picture, and the Otago Peninsula is beyond the harbour to the centre
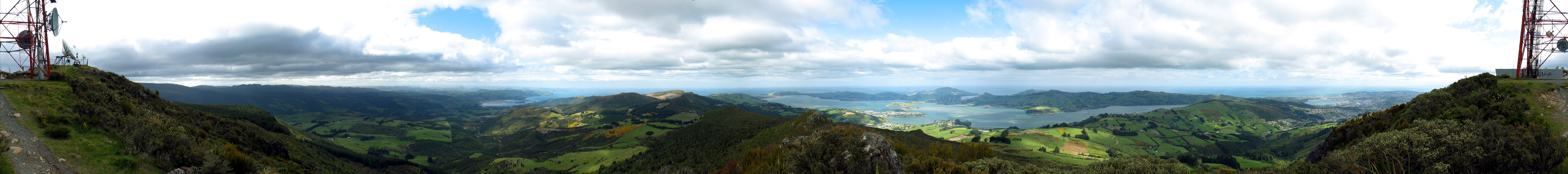
A panorama from just east of the summit of Mount Cargill. The harbour runs from its entrance near the centre to the city centre on the right, the peninsula beyond. The base of a television mast is at the extreme left and right edges
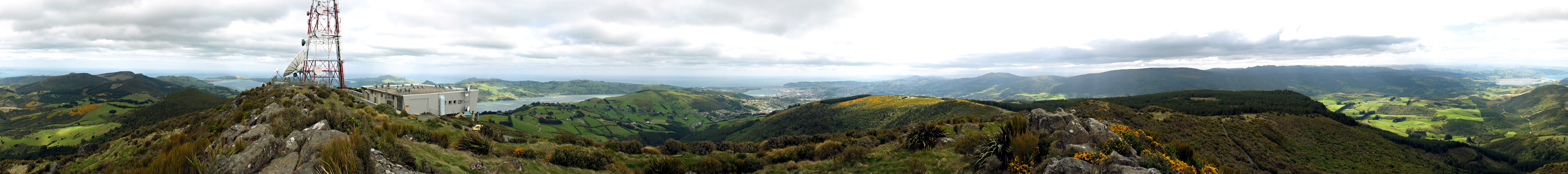
The view from the summit of Mount Cargill. The base of a television mast can be seen on the left, with the harbour and the peninsula beyond. The city centre is in the middle
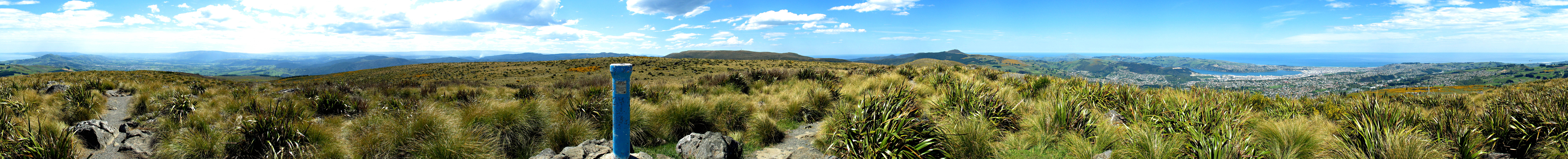
The view from the summit of Flagstaff. The city centre is on the right, and Mosgiel on the left. Mount Cargill is slightly right of centre
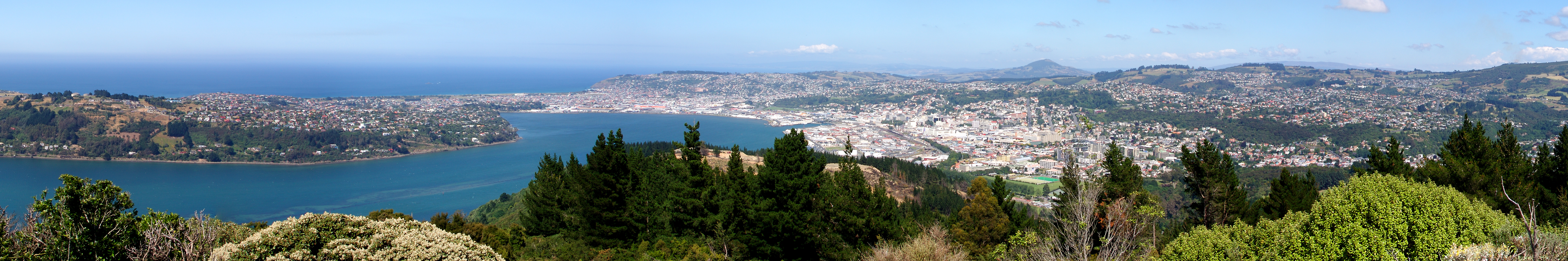
The view from the summit of Signal Hill. Dunedin CBD is in the centre of the image. The Otago Peninsula stretches out to the left

== Events ==
=== Annual events ===
- January – Whare Flat Folk Festival ends
- February – New Zealand Masters Games (Biennial event)
- February – Otago University Students' Association & Otago Polytechnic Orientation Weeks
- February – Dunedin Summer Festival
- March – Dunedin Fringe Festival
- March/April – iD Dunedin Fashion Week
- May – Capping week (University of Otago) including the Capping Show run by the Otago University Students' Association
- May – International Rally of Otago
- May – Dunedin Writers & Readers Festival
- May – Regent Theatre 24-hour book sale (reputedly the southern hemisphere's largest regularly held second-hand book sale)
- June – Dunedin Midwinter Carnival
- June – St. Clair Polar Plunge
- July – University Reorientation
- July – New Zealand International Science Festival (every second year)
- July – Taste Otago Dunedin Food and Wine Festival
- July – Dunedin International Film Festival
- September – Dunedin City Marathon
- September – Dunedin Beer Festival
- October – Dunedin Arts Festival – every second year (even numbered years)
- October – Rhododendron Week
- December – Samstock Music Festival
- December – Santa Parade
- December – Whare Flat Folk Festival begins
- December – New Year's Eve Party Octagon

=== Past events ===
- 1865 – New Zealand Exhibition
- 1889 – New Zealand and South Seas Exhibition (1889)
- 1898 – Otago Jubilee Industrial Exhibition (1898)
- 1925 – New Zealand and South Seas International Exhibition (1925)

== Main sights ==
- Dunedin Railway Station – Railway operator in New Zealand
- Dunedin Town Hall – Municipal building in Dunedin, New Zealand
- Larnach Castle – Mock castle in Dunedin, New Zealand
- Cargill's Castle – Castle ruins in Dunedin, New Zealand
- List of historic places in Dunedin
- Olveston – Historic home and museum in New Zealand
- Otago Farmers Market – Weekly market in Dunedin, New Zealand
- Speight's Brewery – Brewery in Dunedin, New Zealand
- University of Otago Registry Building
- University of Otago Clocktower complex – Historic buildings in the University of Otago campus, New Zealand
- Regent Theatre – Theatre in Dunedin, New Zealand
- Fortune Theatre – Former theatre company in Dunedin, New Zealand
- Dunedin Hospital – Main hospital in Dunedin, New Zealand
- The Octagon – City centre of Dunedin
- Orokonui Ecosanctuary – Fenced wildlife sanctuary north of Dunedin, New Zealand
- Royal Albatross Centre
- St. Clair Beach – Beach in Dunedin, New Zealand
- Forsyth Barr Stadium – Multi-purpose stadium in Dunedin

=== Museums, art galleries, and libraries ===
- Otago Museum
- Toitū Otago Settlers Museum – Museum in Dunedin, New Zealand
- Dunedin Public Art Gallery – Art gallery in Dunedin New Zealand
- Dunedin Public Libraries – Public library system in New Zealand
- Hocken Collections – Research library in Dunedin, New Zealand
- Port Chalmers Maritime Museum

=== Churches ===
- All Saints' Church
- First Church – 19th-century Presbyterian church in Dunedin, New Zealand
- Hanover Street Baptist Church – now Hanover Hall
- Kaikorai Presbyterian Church
- Knox Church – 19th-century Presbyterian church in Dunedin, New Zealand
- St. Joseph's Cathedral – Catholic cathedral in Dunedin, New Zealand
- St Michael's Antiochian Orthodox Church – Greek Orthodox Church in Otago, New Zealand
- St. Matthew's Church – Church building in Dunedin, New Zealand
- St. Paul's Cathedral – Anglican church in Dunedin, New Zealand
- Trinity Wesleyan Church – now the Fortune Theatre (presently not in use)

=== Parks and gardens ===
- Botanic Garden – Botanical garden
- Dunedin Chinese Garden – Chinese garden in Dunedin, New Zealand
- Woodhaugh Gardens – Public park and playground in Dunedin, New Zealand

== International relations ==
=== Sister cities ===
Dunedin is twinned with several cities throughout the world. These include:

- Edinburgh, Scotland, United Kingdom (1974)
- Otaru, Shiribeshi Subprefecture, Hokkaido, Japan (1980)
- Portsmouth, Virginia, United States of America (1962)
- Shanghai, China (1994)

== See also ==
- Dunedin Study – Long-running study of 1037 people born over the course of a year in Dunedin, New Zealand
- List of people from Dunedin
