= 2024 Otago floods =

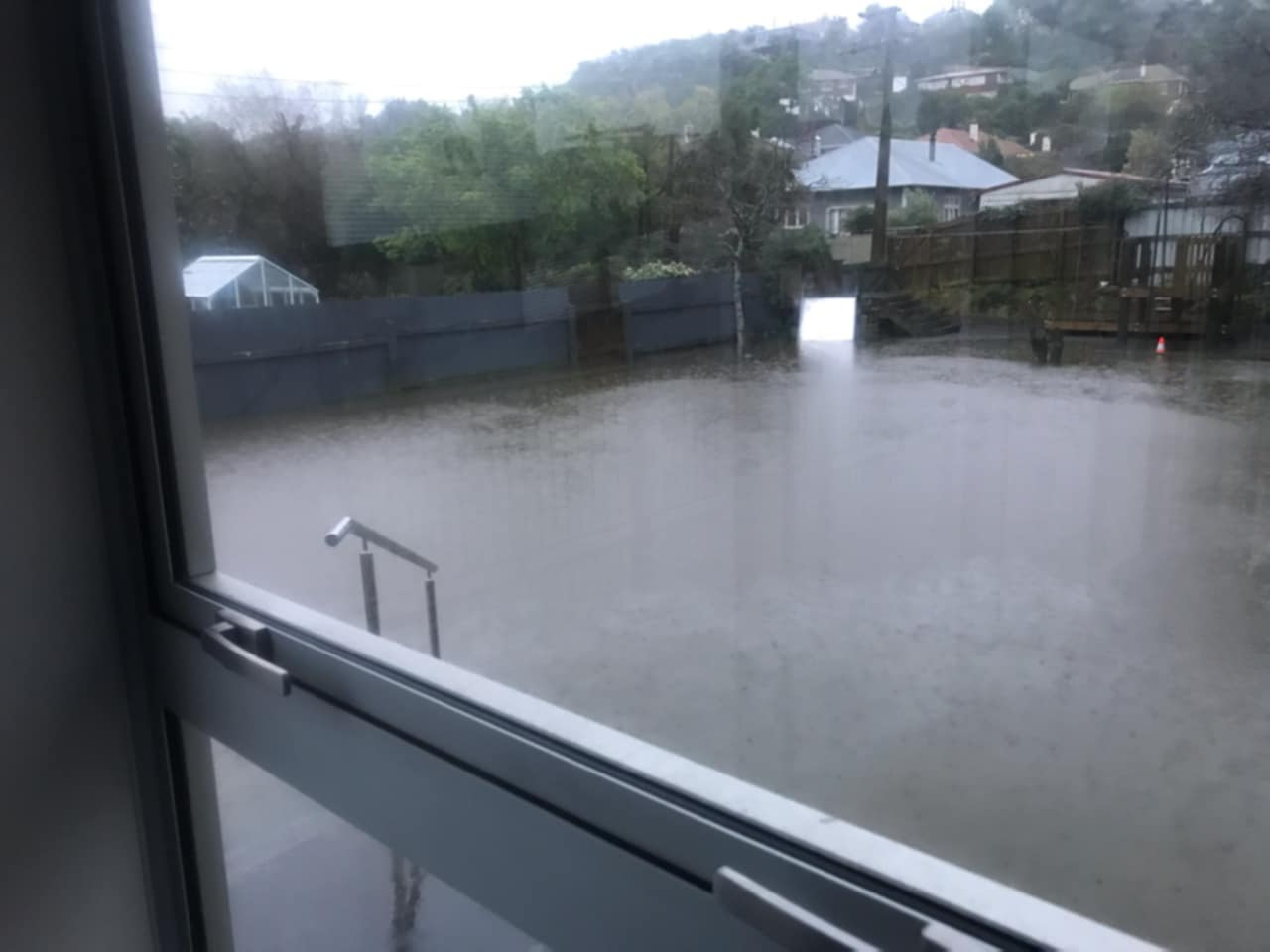
- Flooding in Musselburgh, Dunedin
- Date: 2-4 October 2024
- Location: Dunedin and Clutha District, Otago
- Property damage: NZ$1.5 million (US$930,000) to road and infrastructure in South Otago; NZ$33.8 million (US$21 million) in private insurance claims

In early October 2024, the Otago region of New Zealand's South Island experienced heavy rainfall and significant flooding and landslides. The weather event affected coastal areas in Otago including North Otago, Dunedin, and the Clutha District, which received an estimated two-months worth of rainfall between 2 and 4 October. On 3 October, a state of emergency was declared in Dunedin, with residents in some low-lying suburbs being told to evacuate. By 4 October, the Clutha District had also declared a state of emergency. By 6 October, the state of emergency in Dunedin and Clutha had been lifted due to improving weather conditions and floodwaters subsiding.

== Flood event ==
In early October 2024, MetService had reported low-pressure system approaching New Zealand from the Tasman Sea, bringing warm and humid air across the country. These rain-bearing easterly winds swept into Dunedin, the coastal Clutha District and eastern Otago throughout 3 and 4 October, soaking an already inundated region which had already experienced wet weather. By 3 October 2024, MetService had issued a red severe weather warning for Dunedin, North Otago and the coastal Clutha District, where 150mm of rain was forecast over a 34-hour period. This marked the second red weather warning that the Metservice had issued this year and the 15th red warning issued in New Zealand history. In addition, MetService issued heavy rainfall warnings for the Bay of Plenty and Gisborne District in the North Island.

By 4 October, Emergency Management Otago estimated that Dunedin had received 160mm of rainfall during the 48-hour period leading up to 10:30 am on 4 October. In addition, 180mm of rainfall fell in hill suburbs while the Clutha District experienced 90 mm of rainfall. Similarly, the National Institute of Water and Atmospheric Research's (NIWA) Dunedin weather station estimated that Dunedin had recorded 130.8mm of rain in the last 24 hours by 9:30 am on 4 October, describing it as the "wettest day in over a century" since April 1923. That same day, the MetService retained a red warning in North Otago, Dunedin and coastal Clutha, with rain rates of 8 to 15mm/h forecast for those areas.

While the red warning in parts of Otago had initially been extended until 11pm on 4 October, MetService subsequently downgraded this warning to a yellow heavy rain watch until 9am on 5 October. MetService forecast occasional showers in the coastal Otago area for the night of 4 October and the morning of 5 October, with 10–14 mm accumulating in some places. In addition, the yellow heavy rain watch in Clutha was cancelled while the watch for Southland was lifted.

By 4 October, Balclutha had reported 90mm of rain at 10:30am. By nighttime, the Clutha River's water levels had begun to drop, reaching a peak of 1,940 cubic metres per second (cumecs) at 10pm. Rivers in the Clutha District remained high due to heavy rainfall and snow melt from Central Otago.

On 4 October, the Orauea and Waimatuku rivers respectively rose 4.12 metres and 1.84 metres above their normal water levels, prompting Emergency Southland to activate its flood warning systems for the two rivers and close the Otautau Bridge. By 5 October, Environment Southland confirmed that 16 sites along the Mataura, Waikaia Rivers, Waimea Stream, Ōreti, Makerawa, Aparima, Orauea Rivers, Otautau Stream and Waiau Rivers had reached "High River Watch" status and that their water levels were dropping. That same day, MetService lifted its heavy rain watch for eastern Otago.

=== Related events ===
In addition severe thunderstorms, showers and strong winds were reported in parts of the North Island on 3 October. In the Whitianga township of Ferry Landing, over 103 properties were left without power after strong winds caused trees to fall on power lines. MetService subsequently lifted its severe thunderstorm watch over Auckland and Northland at 4:40 am on 3 October. MetService also reported that Auckland experienced 40 to 60mm of rainfall between 8pm and 5am during that period.

== Impact ==
=== Dunedin and environs ===
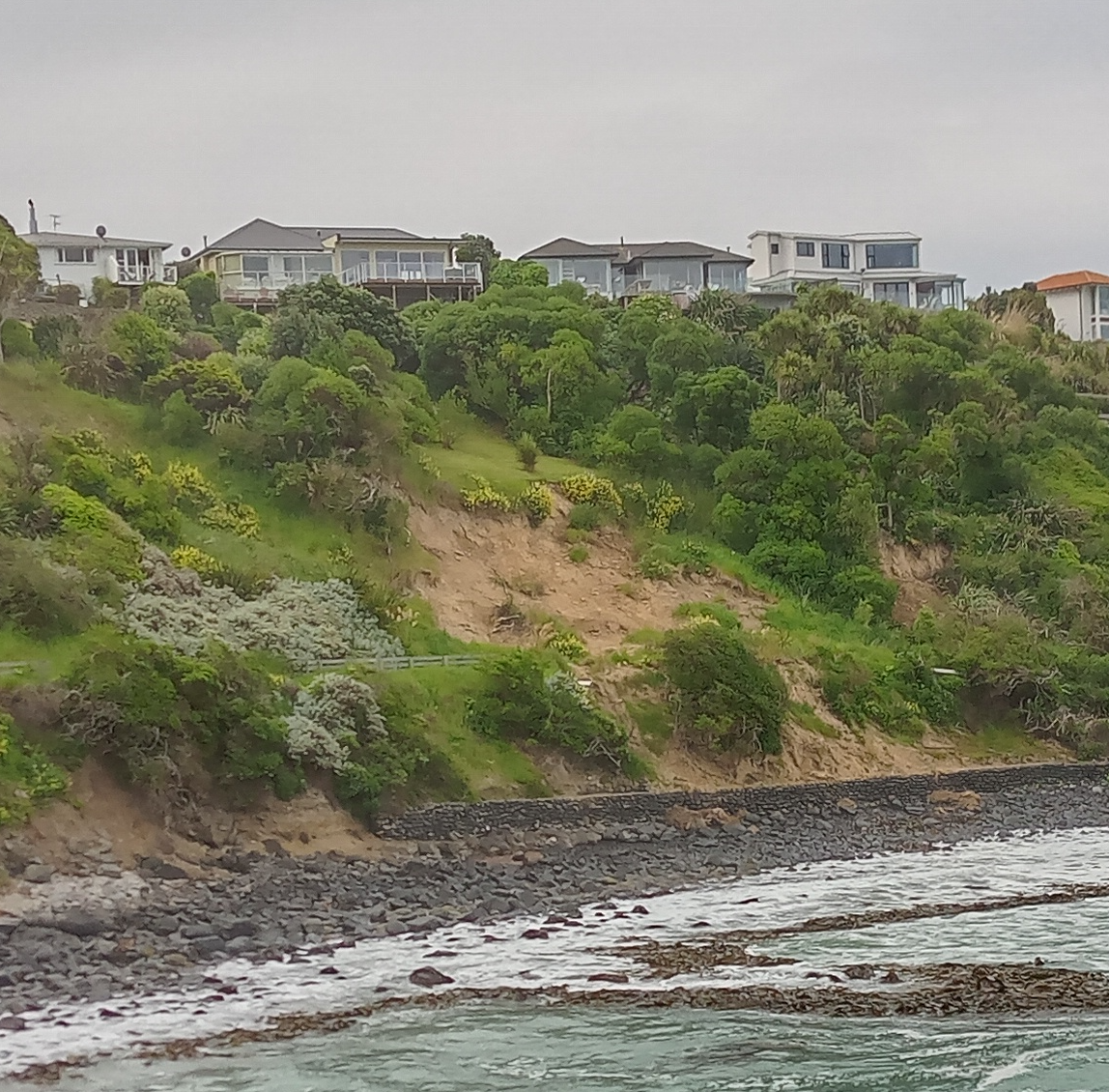
A landslip which blocked the Second Beach Track, St Clair, Dunedin, after the October 2024 Otago floods

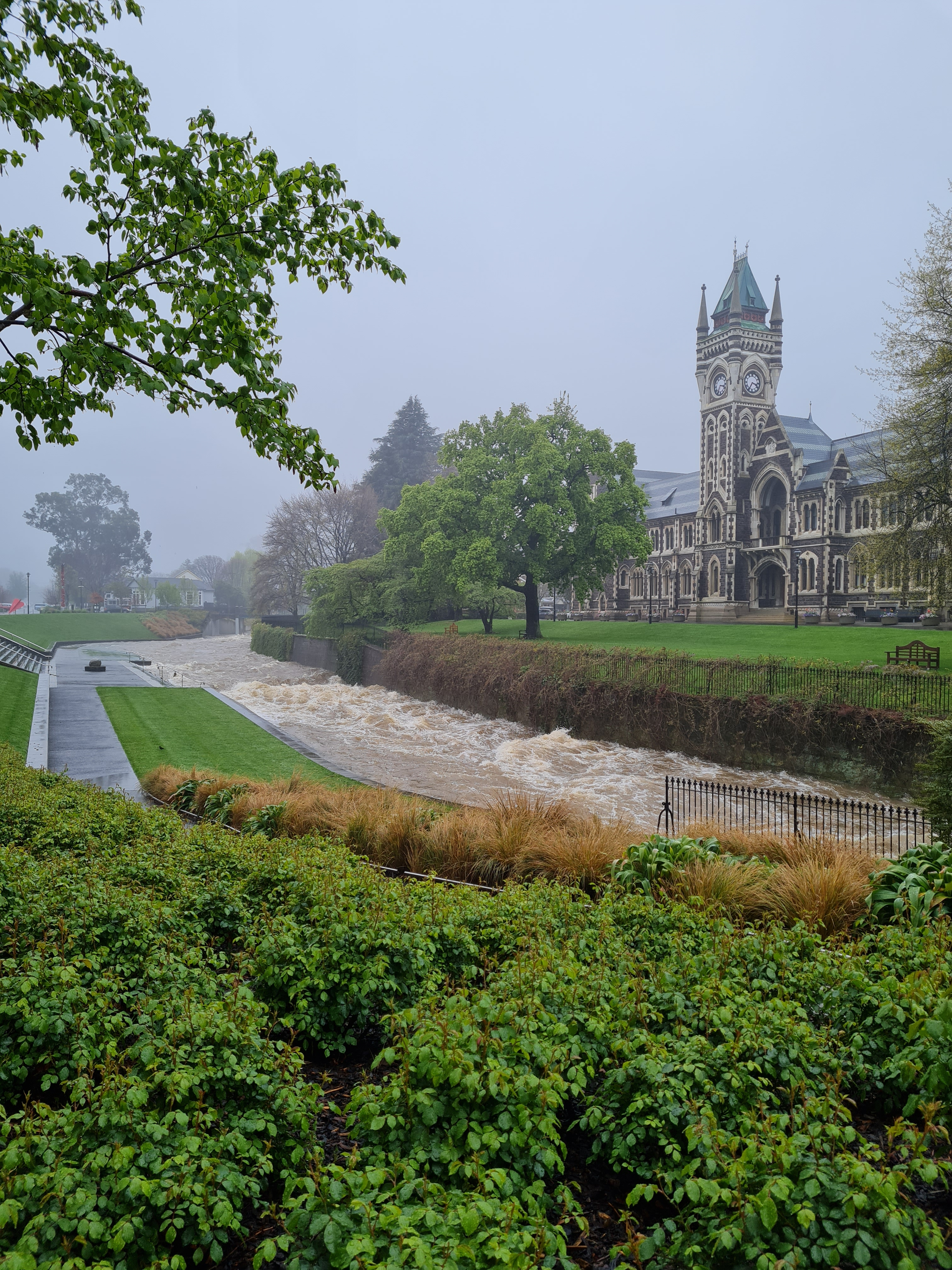
The Water of Leith during a high-flow event (recorded discharge of 33.86 m^{3}/s, two-minutes prior of photo being taken) outside the University Registry Building

At 9:30 pm on 3 October, Civil Defence ordered residents of Surrey Street in the South Dunedin suburbs of Caversham and Forbury to evacuate due to flooding. About 100 people were evacuated from their homes overnight and welfare centres were established at the Saint Clair Golf Club and Forsyth Barr Stadium. According to the Otago Daily Times, 60 homes had been evacuated in South Dunedin by 4 October. In addition, members of the local four-wheel drive club, LandSAR, New Zealand Police, Fire and Emergency New Zealand (FENZ) and the New Zealand Red Cross conducted welfare checks in flood-affected parts of Dunedin and assisted with evacuations. South Dunedin has historically been vulnerable to flooding since it was formerly wetlands that had been drained and resettled for housing during the 19th and 20th centuries. The suburb had experienced significant flooding in 2015 due to the failure of a key pumping station in Portobello.

By 4 October, the Dunedin suburbs of Tainui, Musselburgh, St Kilda, Green Island, Caversham, Kaikorai Valley, Peninsula Road and the area around Hoopers and Papanui Inlets had reported surface flooding. In addition, parts of the North Otago towns of Waikouaiti and Karitane were also flooded. Slips were also reported near Ravensbourne, the Otago Peninsula, Careys Bay, Deborah Bay and Brighton. The Royal Albatross Centre was also cut off due to a road slip. Second Beach Track, a nature walkway in the southwest of the city, remained closed for the remainder of 2024 after heavy slips blocked part of its route.

On 4 October, Waikouaiti Coast Community Board member Sonya Billyard also reported that Waikouaiti had been cut off due to the closure of parts of New Zealand State Highway 1 and the Coast Road. That same day, the NZ Transport Agency Waka Kotahi reported that several highways in coastal Otago including State Highway 88 between Forsyth Barr Stadium and Port Chalmers were closed due to flooding and landslips. In addition, the Dunedin City Council reported 40 roads in Dunedin including Cavell Street, Marlow Street, Cutten Street, MacAndrew Road, Blackhead Road, Tomahawk Road, Kaikorai Valley Road and Portobello Road were closed due to flooding. According to The New Zealand Herald, flooding led to the closure of the four highways to Dunedin, temporarily isolating the city. By noon 4 October, 26 local roads in Dunedin remained closed.

=== Clutha District and others ===
By 3 October, surface flooding had led to the closure of several roads in the Clutha District including Taieri Ferry Rd, Toko Mouth Rd, and Milton's Back Road. In addition, several roads in the Gore District including MacGibbon Road, Waiarikiki Road and McGregor Road were closed due to flooding. In addition, the Lindis Pass (New Zealand State Highway 8) between Tarras and Omarama was also closed due to snowfall. While flooding and road closures in Gore and Invercargill were limited, farmers in the Southland Region had been adversely affected by heavy rainfall in September 2024.

By 4 October, 17 roads in the Clutha District and 17 roads in the Waitaki District remained closed. Roads in the Clutha District affected by flooding and slips included Finlayson Rd, Moturata Rd, Barnego Road between Te Houka and Balclutha, Kaitangata's main street and parts of Karoro Creek Road between Kaka Point and Ahuriri Flat. By 5 October, 65 roads were closed in the Clutha District; with 53 caused by flooding and 12 by landslides.

By 5 October, several wastewater treatment plants in the Clutha District had been inundated due to heavy rainfall and flooding, with sewage and chemicals contaminating floodwaters. The Clutha District Council confirmed that affected wastewater treatment plants were located in Tapanui, Balclutha, Milton, Kaitangata, Waihola, Owaka and Kaka Point. In response, the Council advised residents to avoid floodwaters and to use alternative toilets, limit flushing, bag toilet paper, and avoid using dishwashers, washing machines and washing cars.

On 5 October, the Southland District Council confirmed that 25 roads in the district remained closed as of 8:30 am. The Council confirmed that it was working to reopen the Otautau Stream bridge. That same day, the Gore District Council confirmed that 11 roads remained close. Stuff also reported that Toko Mouth in South Otago was still without electricity. Clutha District Council incident controller Stan Leishman said that the Council aimed to restore power by 6 October. Kaka Point near The Catlins was also cut off by flooding.

== Responses ==
=== Local authorities and civil defence ===
On 3 October, local Civil Defence authorities warned Otago and Southland residents to monitor weather forecasts and prepare for heavy rain by clearing drains and self-evacuating if necessary. The Dunedin City Council also dispatched contractors to check the city's stormwater system and encouraged residents to clear drains of leaves and other debris. Mayor of Dunedin Jules Radich also confirmed that the DCC would commence the distribution of sandbags. That same day, the Otago Regional Council's (ORC) general manager of science and resilience Tom Dyer confirmed that the council was monitoring rivers and streams across the Otago region and had dispatched contractors to clear coastal river mouths.

In response to heavy rainfall and flooding, the DCC and Clutha District Council declared states of emergency in their areas on 3 October. In response to overnight flooding, local authorities and the New Zealand Red Cross established several welfare centres at the Saint Clair Golf Club and Forsyth Barr Stadium in Dunedin, East Otago Community Centre in Waikouaiti, three centres in the Clutha District, Milton and Hampden. Sandbags were also distributed at the Dunedin Ice Stadium, Mosgiel, Middlemarch and the East Otago Events Centre. The DCC also established skip bins for flood-contaminated waste in South Dunedin, Tomahawk Bay and Waikouaiti.

On 4 October, FENZ Assistant Commander Nic McQuillan confirmed that firefighters had responded to 34 flood-related calls between 6pm on 3 October and 7:15 am on 4 October. Firefighters also helped Police evacuate houses near a landslide in St Leonards. The Otago Regional Council also initially suspended all Dunedin bus services due to flooding but later allowed some bus routes to resume on a limited basis. Firefighters later rescued 13 bus passengers on the flooded Waihola highway west of Dunedin. On 4 October, the DCC ordered an evacuation of Waikouaiti.

On 4 October, Mayor of Dunedin Jules Radich said that the city's pipes "coped well" with the flooding and praised the resilience and solidarity of the local community. Radich also said that the level of rainfall during the October 2024 floods was heavier than the 2015 Otago flood, which adversely affected South Dunedin. That same day, Mayor Radich said that the DCC was working to restore running water to the end of the Otago peninsula by the end of 5 October. However, a huge landslip near Ravensbourne was complicating efforts to restore running water to West Harbour and Port Chalmers. In response to flooding in South Dunedin, Radich said that the suburb would need more pipes and pumps to cope with heavy rain in the future.

On 5 October, Mayor of Clutha Bryan Cadogan said that the district was in recovery mode with teams assessing flood damage. On 6 October, local authorities lifted the states of emergency in both Dunedin and Clutha due to improving weather conditions and subsiding floodwaters. On 7 October, the DCC began collecting sandbags and resumed kerbside rubbish collection. While 20 roads remained close across Dunedin, State Highway 88 to Port Chalmers had reopened by Monday morning. However, the Coast Road to Toko Mouth in the Clutha District remained close due to the risk of further slips.

=== Central government ===
On 3 October, Emergency Management and Recovery Minister Mark Mitchell confirmed that he was travelling to Dunedin to support the local community and Civil Defence teams. He arrived in Dunedin on 4 October, where he praised the local emergency response as "proactive and outstanding." He also visited evacuation centres to thank volunteers. Mitchell also reiterated the central government's willingness to assist flood-affected communities in Dunedin. On 4 October, Prime Minister Christopher Luxon also expressed his sympathies with Otago and Southland communities affected by the flooding.

On 4 October, Emergency management group controller Matt Alley, Police and the NZ Transport Agency also advised residents in flood-affected areas to stay home. That same day, an Urban Search and Rescue (USAR) team and New Zealand Defence Force personnel had been mobilised to assist with evacuations and flood recovery efforts in Dunedin.

On 5 October, the Ministry of Social Development issued Civil Defence payments to flood-affected residents in Otago including Dunedin and the Clutha District. By 7 October, Civil Defence payments had been approved for residents of several Clutha areas including Bruce Ward, Kaitangata Matau Ward, Balclutha Ward and Catlins Ward. That same day, Invercargill Member of Parliament Penny Simmonds confirmed that the New Zealand Government had approved an additional NZ$50,000 in government support for flood-affected farmers in Southland and Otago.

On 7 October, Luxon visited Dunedin with Emergency Management Minister Mitchell and New Zealand First list MP Mark Patterson to express support for local residents. He also thanked Dunedin Mayor Julesh Radich and Clutha District Mayor Bryan Cadogan, local councillors and the Civil Defence Team for their work during the flooding. Luxon also confirmed that the Ministry for Primary Industries and Ministry for Social Development would provide support for flood-affected communities. During his visit, Luxon said that he was unaware of Dunedin's failed bid to seek NZ$132.5 million from the New Zealand Treasury's National Resilience Plan to buy at-risk properties in South Dunedin to convert into local flood mitigation systems but acknowledged that New Zealand needed a national response to climate adaptation challenges. Similarly, Mitchell confirmed that the Government was working on a national buyout blueprint for homeowners whose properties were affected by extreme weather events.

Luxon's Dunedin visit also attracted protesters at Dunedin Airport, the Otago Regional Council's headquarters and outside the Dunedin Civil Defence bunker, who opposed the New Zealand Government's plans to downgrade the Dunedin Hospital rebuild and supported a ceasefire in the Gaza war. DCC councillor Steve Walker supported the protesters at the ORC headquarters, accusing the Prime Minister of lying about his promise to fund the Dunedin Hospital rebuild fully. Labour MP for Dunedin Ingrid Leary said the Government had neglected the South Island in favour of the North Island and urged the Government to implement a good relief package for Dunedin.

=== Private sector ===
On 4 October, Aurora Energy confirmed that its teams were responding to power outages in Cape Saunders. Later that day, Aurora Energy temporarily cut power to some customers in Central Dunedin while water was drained from one of its underground substations. That same day, the Bank of New Zealand offered an assistance package to flood-affected customers in Otago and Southland.

On 4 October, Stuff reported that road closures had caused bread shortages at Pak'nSave supermarkets in Invercargill and Queenstown.

== Aftermath ==
=== Economic impact ===
On 9 October, Radio New Zealand reported that many farms in the Clutha District were still flooded a week after the 3–4 October flood event. Clutha Deputy Mayor Ken Payne estimated that a third of the rural education institute Telford's farmland was still submerged, including its milking platform. Farmers were also reporting stock and grazing losses, needing to buy extra feed and send their cows elsewhere for milking. Otago Regional Council science and resilience manager Tom Dyer admitted that the council could have acted faster in cutting into the floodbank to allow the water to drain faster prior to the flooding. Over a dozen Balclutha businesses including MV Motors and Clutha Panel Repairs reported flood damage to their properties and equipment, with Clutha Panel repairs estimated that flooding had caused $100,000 worth in damages.

On 12 October, Fifelity Life insurance company issued a three-month temporary premium waiver for eligible customers in Dunedin and the Clutha District. By 17 October, the Insurance Council of New Zealand had received over 1,000 flood-related insurance claims in Dunedin and Otago. By 21 February 2025, the Insurance Council of New Zealand confirmed that it had received 1,920 private insurance claims relating to the floods from the Otago region, totaling NZ$33.8 million (US$21 million).

The Clutha District Council's deputy chief executive Jules Witt estimated that flood damage to the district's transport network could cost over more than NZ$1 million, and could take months to repair. The Waitaki District Council's roading operations lead engineer Mark Renalson estimated that repair and cleanup costs totaled at least NZ$500,000. The first $100,000 would be funded by the council's operations budget while the rest would be split on a 43:57 basis between the Council and NZ Transport Agency Waka Kotahi. Waitaki District Council water services manager Marty Pacey estimated that Three Waters repair costs to a 200-metre section of Dansey Pass would cost about $20,000. On 29 November 2024, the Clutha District Council estimated that roads and infrastructure in South Otago had sustained NZ$1.5 million (US$930,000) worth of damages.

=== Housing ===
By 5 October, nine homes in Dunedin had been "red-stickered" by Dunedin City Council (DCC) building inspectors, rendering them unsafe to live in. By 6 October, the number of "red stickered" homes in Dunedin had risen to 11. By 9 October, DCC building inspectors had classified 11 homes as "red stickered" and 31 homes as "yellow stickered" (limiting access). 13 homes were "white stickered" (meaning that buildings had little damage but that residents should take precautions).

By 17 October, almost 50 properties in Dunedin had been red or yellow stickered, rendering them uninhabitable or unsafe to live in. In response, the Ministry of Business, Innovation and Employment activated its Temporary Accommodation Service to support households displaced by the flooding.

=== Water infrastructure and services ===
Following the flooding, boil water notices had been issued in several Dunedin and Clutha suburbs including West Harbour and Tapanui. Due to broken water supply pipes pipes, residents of the Otago peninsula, West Harbour, Ocean View, Brighton, Outram, Waikouaiti, Karitane and Hawsbury were instructed to conserve water. Temporary water tanks were installed in Vauxhall, Macandrew Bay and Portobello while portaloos were placed in Aramoana.

On 7 October, boil water and water conservation notices also remained in force in parts of Dunedin and the Clutha District. By 9 October, boil water and water conservation notices remained in place in the Dunedin suburbs of Ravensbourne, Maia, Roseneath, Sawyers Bay, Port Chalmers, Carey's Bay, Deborah Bay and St Leonards. By 12 October, a boil water notice was still active in the Clutha District due to significant damage to local water infrastructure.

=== Flood mitigation ===
In late January 2025, Mayor of Dunedin Jules Radich unveiled a proposed NZ$44 million plan to combat flooding in South Dunedin. This plan involved a three-pronged approach including diverting the Bay View Road and New Street stormwater systems to a new pipe connected to the Portobello pumping station (NZ$1.9m), upgrading the Forbury Road pipe ($12m), and disconnecting the Hillside Road mains and pumping to the Orari Street outfall (NZ$15.2m). The draft 2025 budget also included allocating NZ$15 million for future medium-term flood alleviation work in South Dunedin. Dunedin City councillors voted by a margin of 13 to 1 to approve the plan; with the sole objection coming from Cr Lee Vandervis.
