= Te Aka Ōtākou =

Cycleway in Dunedin, New Zealand

Coordinates: 45°52′14″S 170°32′05″E

- Location: Dunedin, New Zealand
- Established: 2023
- Use: Walking, Cycling

Te Aka Ōtākou (The Otago Vine) is a cycleway and shared pathway for walking and cycling in Dunedin, New Zealand, which follows the shoreline of the Otago Harbour. It also known as the Otago Harbour Cycleway, and has previously been known by various names, including The Harbour Loop, and by the names of various sections (e.g., the Dunedin-St Leonards cycleway).

== Route ==
The cycleway has been built in various section through the early years of the 21st century, and as of 2022 extended in an unbroken section from St Leonards along the western edge of the Otago Harbour south to the heart of Dunedin City parallel with the South Island Main Trunk railway and SH 88, along Portsmouth Drive on the Southern Endowment at the head of the harbour, and along Portobello Road close to the shore of Otago Peninsula as far as Macandrew Bay (opened in September 2020). Further sections were then completed from Broad Bay to Portobello. The completion in 2023 of sections between St Leonards and Port Chalmers and between Macandrew Bay and Broad Bay created a single cycleway/pathway 36 kilometres (22 mi) in length. The cycleway briefly shares roadway between Fryatt Street and Wharf Street close to the city's docks, a distance of some 1200 metres.

== New infrastructure ==
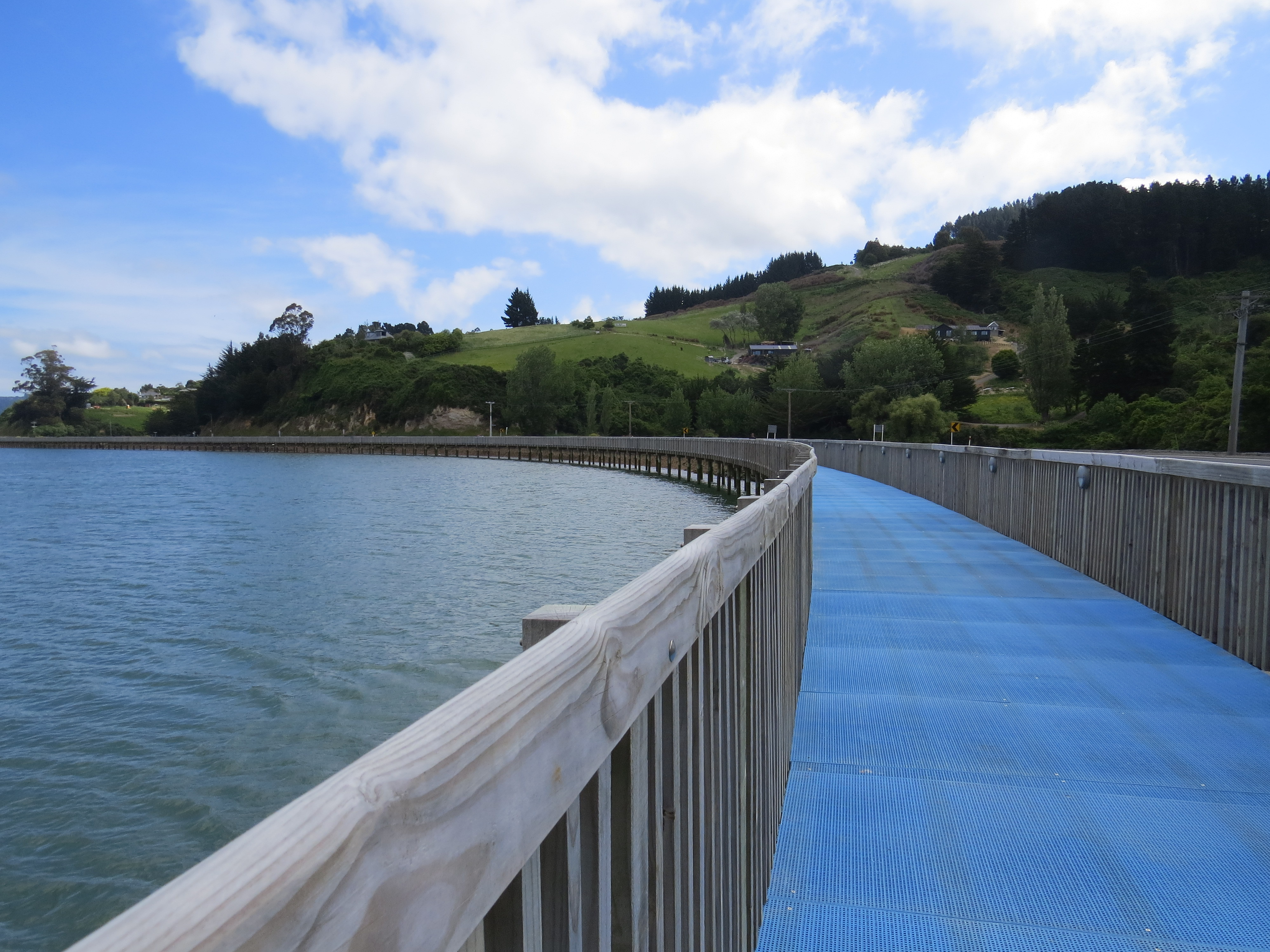
Foot and cycle causeway at Blanket Bay

The creation of the pathway has included the widening of various roads around the city, notably the extension and separating of paths on the embankment that runs along the edge of Otago Peninsula. On the other side of the harbour, causeways used by the rail line have been widened to create room for the cycleway, and a new 600-metre (660 yd) boardwalk causeway was constructed crossing Blanket Bay between St Leonards and Port Chalmers.

Within the heart of the city, a new bridge was constructed across the mouth of the Water of Leith and extensive short cycling and walking paths were created close by at the time of the construction of the nearby Forsyth Barr Stadium.

== Artwork ==
The section of cycleway close to Roseneath includes a large retaining wall decorated with a stylised taniwha by local artist Simon Kaan.

The cycleway runs close to a controversial sculpture of giant teeth, Harbour Mouth Molars by Regan Gentry, at the northwestern end of Portsmouth Drive.

A large brutalist sculpture, Kuri/Dog by Stephen Mulqueen, guards the harbourside close to Otago Yacht Club, just to the northwest of the mouth of the Leith. This was constructed prior to the opening of the cycleway in 2008. The cycleway also passes close to another older work, Toroa by Peter Nicholls.
