= Blanket Bay (Otago Harbour) =

Bay in New Zealand

Coordinates: 45°50′00″S 170°35′30″E

Blanket Bay is a bay on the western side of Otago Harbour, within the city of Dunedin, New Zealand.

== Geography ==
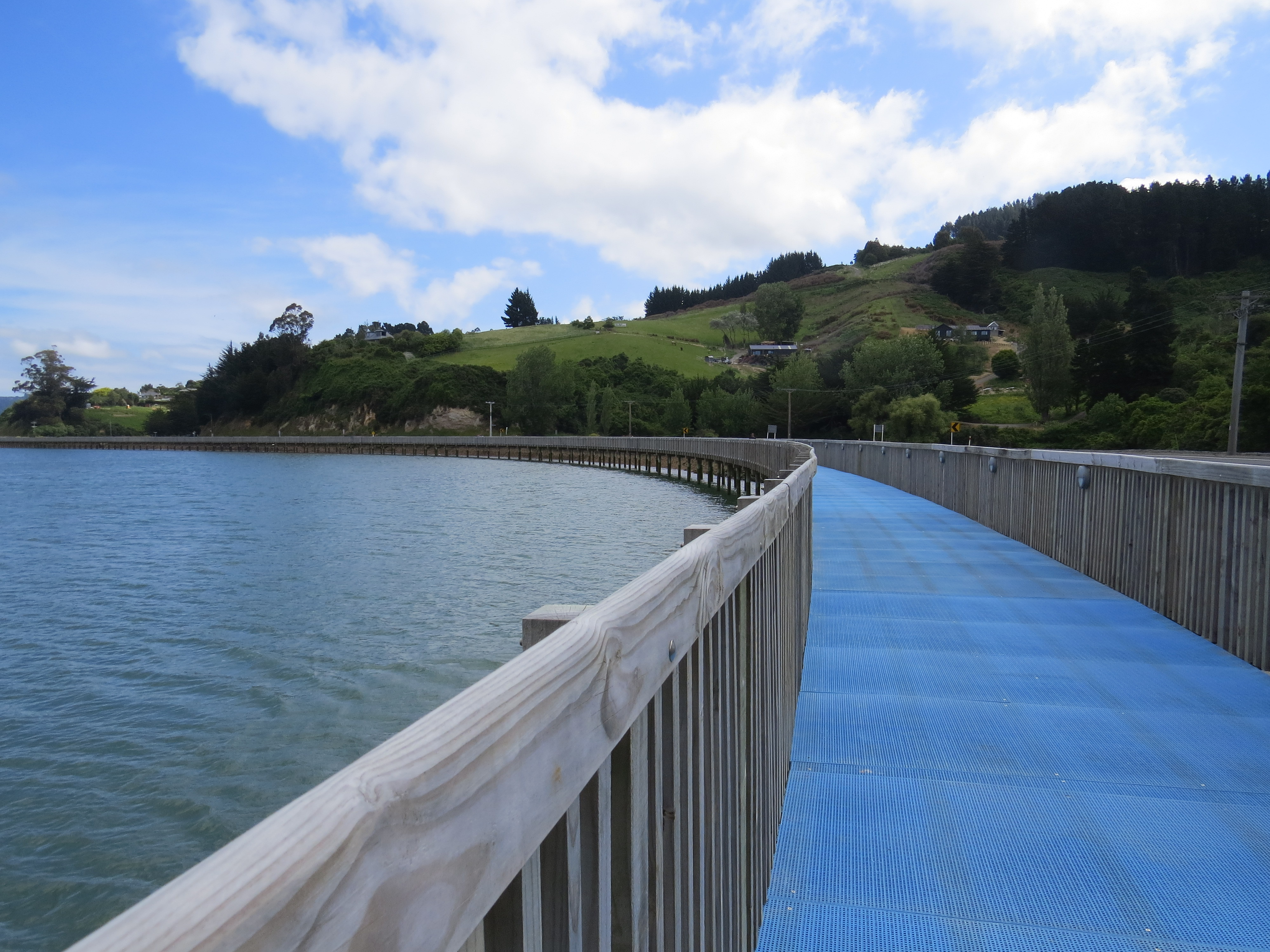
Foot and cycle causeway, part of Te Aka Ōtākou, at Blanket Bay

One of the largest of the bays on the western side of the harbour, it stretches from Kilgours Point, on the Roseneath Peninsula in the north to Curles Point, on the outskirts of the settlement of St Leonards in the south, a distance of some 1,200 metres (0.75 mi). The bay has two lobes, with the coast bowing out to a small headland halfway along the bay's length. The harbour's main shipping channel, the Victoria Channel, runs across the mouth of the bay.

The bay is crossed by three causeways. Of these the oldest is part of SH 88, the main road between Dunedin city centre and the city's port, Port Chalmers. This largely hugs the edge of hills along the harbour edge, but a remnant of bay lies behind the road, connected to it by drainage pipes. The second causeway is a railway link, part of the South Island Main Trunk, that runs across the mouth of the bay. Between the two, running close to the road link, is a combined foot and cycle path completed in 2023. This is part of Te Aka Ōtākou (The Otago Vine), a link running around the perimeter of the harbour.

== History ==
Blanket Bay was the site of one of Otago's most notable shipwrecks. On 4 July 1863, the two harbour steamers Pride of the Yarra and Favourite collided at the mouth of Blanket Bay, resulting in the loss of 12 lives, including the Rev. Thomas Hewett Campbell, newly appointed rector of Otago Boys' High School, and his family.
