= Blanket Bay =

There are several places called Blanket Bay:

== In Australia ==
- Blanket Bay (Victoria), in Great Otway National Park

== In New Zealand ==
- Blanket Bay (Otago Harbour), located south of Port Chalmers in Otago Harbour
- Blanket Bay (Lake Wakatipu), located close to Glenorchy, Otago
- Blanket Bay, at the southern tip of Secretary Island in Doubtful Sound, Fiordland
