= Roseneath, New Zealand =

Roseneath is the name of two places in New Zealand:

- Roseneath, Wellington, a suburb of Wellington
- Roseneath, Otago, on the shore of Otago Harbour
