= List of shipwrecks in July 1863 =

The list of shipwrecks in July 1863 includes ships sunk, foundered, grounded, or otherwise lost during July 1863.

== 1 July ==
List of shipwrecks: 1 July 1863
Ship	State	Description
Catherine Green	United Kingdom	The ship struck reefs off Bermuda and sank.
Diligence	United Kingdom	The ship was wrecked in Hondeklip Bay.
Maese	United Kingdom	The ship ran aground near Tarifa, Spain. She was on a voyage from Swansea, Glamorgan to Galați, Ottoman Empire. She was refloated and put in to Cádiz, Spain in a leaky condition.

== 2 July ==
List of shipwrecks: 2 July 1863
Ship	State	Description
Anna F. Schmidt	United States	American Civil War, CSS Alabama's South Atlantic Expeditionary Raid: The 784-ton ship, with a cargo of clothes, medicines, clocks, sewing machines, and an invention for killing bed bugs, was captured and burned in the South Atlantic Ocean (25°27′S 37°56′W) by the screw sloop-of-war CSS Alabama (Confederate States Navy).
Rose	United Kingdom	The ship was wrecked in Kenmare Bay.

== 3 July ==
List of shipwrecks: 3 July 1863
Ship	State	Description
Chancellor	United Kingdom	The steamship was wrecked at Ventnor, Isle of Wight. Her passengers were landed. She was on a voyage from Stokes Bay to Ventnor.
David and John	United Kingdom	The schooner was driven ashore on Lindisfarne, Northumberland. She was on a voyage from Montrose, Forfarshire to Sunderland, County Durham. She was refloated and resumed her voyage.
Highland Light	United Kingdom	The ship ran aground at Aden.
Unidentified sloop	Confederate States of America	American Civil War, Union blockade: The sloop was destroyed at Cumberland, Virginia, by the armed sidewheel gunboat USS Commodore Morris (United States Navy).

== 4 July ==
List of shipwrecks: 4 July 1863
Ship	State	Description
Jane Ann	United Kingdom	The ship was driven ashore at Östergarn, Gotland, Sweden. Her crew were rescued. She was on a voyage from Vyborg, Grand Duchy of Finland to West Hartlepool, County Durham.
Vigilant	United Kingdom	The ship was lost in Liverpool Bay. Her six crew were rescued by the New Brighton Lifeboat.
Two unidentified schooners	Confederate States of America	American Civil War, Union blockade: Fleeing the approaching gunboat USS Sciota (United States Navy), the two schooners, carrying cargoes of cotton, grounded on the coast of Texas in Corpus Christi Bay and were burned by boat crews from Sciota.

== 5 July ==
List of shipwrecks: 5 July 1863
Ship	State	Description
Judah Touro	Confederate States of America	American Civil War: The 332-ton sidewheel paddle steamer was burned at Shreveport, Louisiana, to prevent her capture by Union forces.
Pearl	United Kingdom	The schooner broke from her moorings, drifted into a bridge and was damaged at Havre de Grâce, Seine-Inférieure, France.
Stores	United Kingdom	The schooner sprang a leak and foundered off Seacombe, Cheshire. She was on a voyage from Barrow-in-Furness to Liverpool, Lancashire.

== 6 July ==
List of shipwrecks: 6 July 1863
Ship	State	Description
Express	United States	American Civil War, CSS Alabama's South Atlantic Expeditionary Raid: The 1,072-ton full-rigged ship, sailing from Callao, Peru, to Antwerp, Belgium, with a cargo of guano, was captured and burned in the South Atlantic Ocean off the coast of Brazil at 28°28′S 30°07′W by the screw sloop-of-war CSS Alabama (Confederate States Navy).
Mantura	United Kingdom	The ship ran aground at Milford Haven, Pembrokeshire. She was on a voyage from Cardiff, Glamorgan to Barcelona, Spain. She was refloated on 30 July.
Nueva Celesta	Spain	The steamship ran aground on the Goodwin Sands, Kent, United Kingdom. She was on a voyage from Bilbao to a Norwegian port. She was refloated and taken in to The Downs.
Pride of the Yarra	(United Kingdom of Great Britain and Ireland) New Zealand	The steamer, bearing 50 passengers from Port Chalmers to Dunedin who had just arrived in the colony from Great Britain, collided with the paddle steamer Favourite near Sawyers Bay. The Pride of the Yarra was heavily holed and sank quickly. Twelve lives were lost, including Rev. Thomas Campbell, newly appointed rector of Otago Boys' High School, and his entire family.

== 7 July ==
List of shipwrecks: 7 July 1863
Ship	State	Description
Alice Dean	United States	American Civil War: The 411-ton sidewheel paddle steamer was captured on the Ohio River at Brandenburg, Kentucky, by troops under the command of John Hunt Morgan (Confederate States Army) aboard the captured John T. McCombs (United States). They burned Alice Dean near the Indiana bank of the river between Mauckport and Morvin's Landing.
Award	United Kingdom	The ship was lost in ice off Ivittuut, Greenland.
Henry Ormond	(United Kingdom of Great Britain and Ireland) Virgin Islands	The schooner foundered off Le Vauclin, Martinique with the loss of one life. She was on a voyage from Trinidad to Barbados.
Polliana	France	The schooner was wrecked near Brook, Isle of Wight, United Kingdom. She was on a voyage from Dunkirk, Nord to Toulon, Var. She sank the next day during salvage attempts.

== 8 July ==
List of shipwrecks: 8 July 1863
Ship	State	Description
Almira	United States	The 84-foot-3-inch (25.68 m), 80.35-gross register ton scow schooner was dismasted and capsized on Lake Ontario with the loss of all hands. She was recovered, repaired, and returned to service.
Broomielaw	United Kingdom	The ship was wrecked in the Bassein River.
Constitution	United States	American Civil War: The barque, captured in the Atlantic Ocean by the merchant raider CSS Georgia (Confederate States Navy) on 25 June on the 48th day of a voyage from Philadelphia, Pennsylvania, to Shanghai, China, with a cargo of coal, was used for target practice by Georgia′s gunners, set alight, and destroyed by the resulting fire.
Flying Fish	(United Kingdom of Great Britain and Ireland) New Zealand	The schooner sailed from Napier, New Zealand, for Auckland with six people on board, and was not sighted again.
Princesza de Torrevieja	Spain	The ship departed from Buenos Aires, Argentina for the English Channel. No further trace, presumed foundered with the loss of all hands.
Rienzi	United States	American Civil War: The whaler, a schooner returning from a whaling expedition to the South Pacific Ocean carrying a cargo of whale oil, was captured and burned in the Atlantic Ocean within 50 nautical miles (93 km; 58 mi) of New York by the screw sloop-of-war CSS Florida (Confederate States Navy).
Sovereign of India	India	The troopship was driven ashore in the Yangtze near Woosung, China. She was on a voyage from Bombay to Shanghai, China. She had been refloated by 15 July.
Toimi	(Russian Empire) Grand Duchy of Finland	The brig collided with UK screwsteamer Cronstadt and sank off Hogland, Russia with the loss of a crew member. She was on a voyage from Lübeck to Hamina, Grand Duchy of Finland.
William B. Nash	United States	American Civil War: The brig, carrying a cargo of lard, was captured and burned in the North Atlantic Ocean off New York by the screw sloop-of-war CSS Florida (Confederate States Navy).

== 9 July ==
List of shipwrecks: 9 July 1863
Ship	State	Description
Lyra	United Kingdom	The ship ran aground on the Fultah Sandbank, in the Hooghly River. She was on a voyage from Liverpool, Lancashire to Calcutta, India. She was refloated and completed her voyage.
Triumph	United Kingdom	The brig was abandoned at sea. She was on a voyage from Mauritius to Sydney, New South Wales.

== 10 July ==
List of shipwrecks: 10 July 1863
Ship	State	Description
Britain's Pride	United Kingdom	The schooner ran aground at Smyrna, Ottoman Empire. She was on a voyage from Smyrna to Bristol, Gloucestershire.
Enoch Dean	United States	American Civil War: Carrying African Americans for the Freedmen's Bureau, the transport struck piles, ran aground, and was burned at Willstown Bluff on the Pon Pon River in Georgia, Confederate States of America more than 30 miles (48 km) from the river′s mouth.
Jeanette Melanie	United Kingdom	The ship foundered in the Atlantic Ocean off Cabo da Roca, Portugal.

== 11 July ==
List of shipwrecks: 11 July 1863
Ship	State	Description
Atahualpa	United Kingdom	The barque struck the Buey Rock, in Valparaíso Bay. She was on a voyage from Liverpool, Lancashire to Valparaíso, Chile. She consequently foundered on 14 July.
James Crossfield	United Kingdom	The full-rigged ship was driven ashore at Canterbury Point, India. She was on a voyage from Liverpool, Lancashire to Calcutta, India. She was refloated and completed her voyage.
Lorentze	(United Kingdom of Great Britain and Ireland) British North America	The ship was wrecked near Cape St. Lawrence, Cape Breton Island, Nova Scotia. She was on a voyage from Buctouche, New Brunswick to Liverpool, Lancashire.
Trinidad	(United Kingdom of Great Britain and Ireland) British North America	The ship was run ashore in the Turks Islands. She was refloated the next day.

== 12 July ==
List of shipwrecks: 12 July 1863
Ship	State	Description
Kate	Confederate States of America	American Civil War, Union blockade: The steamer was forced aground at Smith's Island, North Carolina by the gunboat USS Penobscot (United States Navy). The Confederates refloated her on 31 July and moved her to New Inlet, North Carolina, but abandoned her when United States Navy ships approached.
Trimmer	United States	The ship was run into by Great Eastern (United Kingdom) and sank at Norwalk, Connecticut with the loss of two of her crew. She was on a voyage from Albany, New York to Newport, Rhode Island.

== 13 July ==
List of shipwrecks: 13 July 1863
Ship	State	Description
USS Baron DeKalb	United States Navy	American Civil War: The City-class ironclad gunboat was sunk by a Confederate mine without loss of life in the Yazoo River 1 to 2 nautical miles (1.9 to 3.7 km) below Yazoo City, Mississippi, Confederate States of America.
Dowthorpe	United Kingdom	The ship was wrecked 3 nautical miles (5.6 km) south of "Bovree", India. Her crew were rescued.
CSS Edward J. Gay	Confederate States Navy	American Civil War: The 823-ton sidewheel paddle steamer was burned and scuttled as a blockship by Confederate forces in the Yazoo River at the mouth of the Yalobusha River near Yazoo City, Mississippi, both to obstruct the Yalobusha and to prevent her capture by Union forces.
Manigault	Confederate States of America	American Civil War, Union blockade: Hit by Union artillery the previous day, suffering one killed and boiler damage, the steam scow was burned by Union forces in Charleston Harbor at either James Island or Morris Island.
Thomas Scott	United States	The 149-ton sternwheel paddle steamer struck a snag and sank in the Ohio River above Warsaw, Kentucky.
Two unidentified steamers	Confederate States of America	American Civil War: The two steamers – possibly Fort Hindman and James Thompson – were burned in the Little Red River in Louisiana by the sidewheel gunboats USS Manitou and USS Rattler (both United States Navy).

== 14 July ==
List of shipwrecks: 14 July 1863
Ship	State	Description
Augustine	Belgium	The brigantine was wrecked at "Bisano".
Electra	United States	The 348-ton whaling ship was wrecked on Nunivak Island in the Bering Sea (Some reports place her loss in the Aleutian Islands on either Ugamak Island or Unimak Island).
Joseph Meigs	United States	The ship ran ground on Fowey Rocks, Florida and was wrecked.
Llan Rumney	United Kingdom	The ship ran aground on the Saugor Flat.
CSS Magnolia	Confederate States Navy	American Civil War: The 824-ton sidewheel paddle steamer was burned by Confederate forces on the Yazoo River 4 to 5 nautical miles (7.4 to 9.3 km) above Yazoo City, Mississippi, to prevent her capture by approaching United States Navy gunboats.
CSS Mary E. Keene	Confederate States Navy	American Civil War: The 659-ton sidewheel paddle steamer was scuttled by Confederate forces at the foot of French Bend in the Yazoo River either near Yazoo City or 2 nautical miles (3.7 km) below Greenwood, Mississippi to prevent her capture by approaching United States Navy gunboats. Union forces burned the portion of the wreck above the waterline on 24 July.
Montézuma	French Navy	The paddle frigate was wrecked in the Goatzacoalcos River, Mexico. The wreck was burnt on 27 July.
CSS Peytona	Confederate States Navy	American Civil War: The 685-ton sidewheel paddle steamer was burned and scuttled by Confederate forces in the Yazoo River at Eureka Landing near Satartia, to prevent her capture by United States Navy gunboats.
CSS Prince of Wales	Confederate States Navy	American Civil War: The 572-ton sidewheel paddle steamer was burned by Confederate forces on the Yazoo River opposite Andrews Landing near Yazoo City, Mississippi, to prevent her capture by United States Navy gunboats.
USS Sciota	United States Navy	American Civil War: The gunboat collided with the screw steamer USS Antona (United States Navy) on the Mississippi River in Plaquemines Parish, Louisiana, Confederate States of America about 8 nautical miles (15 km) above Quarantine Station and sank. She was refloated in late August, repaired, and returned to service.
Superb	United Kingdom	The schooner was wrecked at Thisted, Denmark with the loss of four of her six crew. She was on a voyage from Newcastle upon Tyne, Northumberland to Memel, Prussia.

== 15 July ==
List of shipwrecks: 15 July 1863
Ship	State	Description
Capital	United Kingdom	The ship foundered in the North Sea. Her crew survived. She was on a voyage from Hartlepool, County Durham to Kronstadt, Russia.
HNLMS Medus	Royal Netherlands Navy	The corvette was fired on in the Shimonoseki Straits and was severely damaged with the loss of four of her crew. She was on a voyage from Nagasaki to Kanagawa, Japan.
436	Russia	The lighter sank between Kronstadt and Saint Petersburg.

== 16 July ==
List of shipwrecks: 16 July 1863
Ship	State	Description
Capital	United Kingdom	The ship foundered in the North Sea. She was on a voyage from Hartlepool, County Durham to Kronstadt, Russia.
Kosei	Japan	Prelude to the Shimonoseki Campaign, Battle of Shimonoseki Straits: The brig was sunk in the Shimonoseki Straits by USS Wyoming (United States Navy).
Koshin	Japan	Koshin Prelude to the Shimonoseki Campaign, Battle of Shimonoseki: The steamship was sunk in the Shimonoseki Straits by USS Wyoming (United States Navy).
Iberia	United Kingdom	The ship was abandoned in the Dogger Bank with the loss of a crew member. She was on a voyage from Sunderland, County Durham to Kronstadt, Russia.
Jane and Isabella	United Kingdom	The snow foundered in the North Sea. Her crew were rescued. She was on a voyage from Sunderland to Kronstadt.
John and Ann	United Kingdom	The ship ran aground off Lowestoft, Suffolk. She was on a voyage from Newcastle upon Tyne, Northumberland to Rotterdam, South Holland, Netherlands. She was refloated and put in to Lowestoft in a leaky condition.

== 17 July ==
List of shipwrecks: 17 July 1863
Ship	State	Description
Arcadia	Confederate States of America	American Civil War: The 343-ton sidewheel paddle steamer was scuttled and burned by Confederate forces in the Yazoo River in Mississippi about 1 nautical mile (1.9 km) below the mouth of the Yalobusha River or about 1 nautical mile (1.9 km) below Greenwood, Mississippi to prevent her capture by Union forces.
Ferd Kennet, or Fred Kennett	Confederate States of America	American Civil War: The 591-ton sidewheel paddle steamer was burned and scuttled by Confederate forces in the Yazoo River at the mouth of the Yalobusha River near Yazoo City, Mississippi, both to obstruct the Yalobusha and to prevent her capture by Union forces.
Gipsy Bride	United Kingdom	The ship was wrecked on the Scarborough Shoal. All on board took to six boats. Five boats reached shore, those in the sixth were rescued by a Spanish coaster. She was on a voyage from Manila, Spanish East Indies to Singapore, Straits Settlements.

== 18 July ==
List of shipwrecks: 18 July 1863
Ship	State	Description
Alice Hawthorn, and Nouveau Luminy	United Kingdom; France	The barque Alice Hawthorn and the full-rigged ship Nouveau Luminy collided in the Mediterranean Sea 40 nautical miles (74 km) south of Marbella, Spain and both foundered without loss of life. Five crew of Nouveau Luminy reached Málaga, Spain in a yawl. Seven crew of Alice Hawthorn and six crew of Nouveau Luminy took to a boat and were rescued by Emil (Kingdom of Hanover). Three crew of Alice Hawthorn and eleven crew of Nouveau Luminy took to a boat and were rescued by Storforts Constantine (Russia). Alice Hawthorn was on a voyage from Constanţa, Ottoman Empire to Falmouth, Cornwall. Nouveau Luminy was on a voyage from Cocanada, India to Marseille, Bouches-du-Rhône.
Carmen	Spain	The ship departed from Matanzas, Cuba for Falmouth, Cornwall, United Kingdom. No further trace, presumed foundered with the loss of all hands.
George Peabody	United States	American Civil War: The ship was aground at Mathias Point, Virginia, Confederate States of America.
Hartford City	Confederate States of America	American Civil War: The steamboat was burned by Confederate forces on either the Tallahatchie River or Yazoo River in Mississippi to prevent her capture by Union forces.

== 19 July ==
List of shipwrecks: 19 July 1863
Ship	State	Description
Boreas	(United Kingdom of Great Britain and Ireland) British North America	The brigantine was wrecked on Shag Harbour Island. She was on a voyage from New York, United States to Halifax, Nova Scotia.
Marklands	(United Kingdom of Great Britain and Ireland) British North America	The schooner ran aground on the Gordon Sands. She was on a voyage from South Shields, County Durham to Pará, Brazil. She was refloated and put in to Ramsgate, Kent in a leaky condition.
Raccoon	United Kingdom	American Civil War, Union blockade: The crew of the 159-register ton sidewheel paddle steamer ran her aground on Drunken Dick Shoal near Moultrie House on the coast of South Carolina, Confederate States of America after the screw sloop-of-war USS Canandaigua (United States Navy) intercepted her as she tried to run the Union blockade from Nassau, Bahamas into Charleston, South Carolina, with a cargo of lead. The broadside ironclad USS New Ironsides (United States Navy) shelled her. Raccoon′s crew burned her on 20 July to prevent her capture by Union forces.

== 20 July ==
List of shipwrecks: 20 July 1863
Ship	State	Description
Cambria	United Kingdom	The ship was driven ashore at Matane, Province of Canada, British North America.
Caribou	United Kingdom	The full-rigged ship was destroyed by fire 360 nautical miles (670 km) north west of Saint Vincent. Her 26 crew took to two boats. They were rescued by a British and a Dutch barque. She was on a voyage from Liverpool, Lancashire to Bombay, India.
Caroline	United Kingdom	The ship ran aground in the Saint Lawrence River downstream of Trois-Rivières, Province of Canada. She was on a voyage from Trois-Rivières to Liverpool. She had been refloated by 31 July.
Colonel Hill	Confederate States of America	American Civil War: The steamer was boarded and burned on the Tar River near Tarboro, North Carolina, by men of the 12th New York Cavalry Regiment (Union Army).
Governor Morehead	Confederate States of America	American Civil War: The sternwheel paddle steamer was destroyed by Union Army forces in North Carolina in the vicinity of the Neuse and Pamlico Rivers, or on the Tar River at Tarboro.
Lisbon	United Kingdom	The ship was destroyed by fire in the Atlantic Ocean. Her crew survived. She was on a voyage from Liverpool to Bombay.
Little Dorrit	United Kingdom	The schooner was wrecked on the coast of New Jersey, United States. Her crew were rescued. She was on a voyage from Cienfuegos, Cuba to New York, United States.
Psyche	United Kingdom	The ship ran aground in the Atlantic Ocean 34 nautical miles (63 km) east of Sulina, Brazil and was abandoned by her crew. She was on a voyage from Swansea to Pará, Brazil.
William J. Romer	United States	The pilot-boat was wrecked off Barnegat Bay. She struck a submerged rock and sank, with the loss of one pilot. The Romer Shoal Light in New York Harbor was named for the Romer that sank there.
Unnamed ironclad	Confederate States of America	American Civil War: The incomplete ironclad warship, known informally as the "Tar River Ironclad," was captured and destroyed by the 3rd New York Cavalry Regiment (Union Army) while still on the building ways at Tarboro.

== 21 July ==
List of shipwrecks: 21 July 1863
Ship	State	Description
Alfredo	Portugal	The ship was wrecked at Lisbon. Her crew were rescued. She was on a voyage from São Miguel Island, Azores to Lisbon.
Atlanta	United Kingdom	The ship was abandoned in the North Sea off Whitby, Yorkshire. She was on a voyage from Sunderland, County Durham to Whitby.
Hunter	United Kingdom	The ship ran aground in the Baltic Sea. She was on a voyage from Stettin to Leith, Lothian. She was refloated and put in to Helsingør, Denmark in a leaky condition.
Revenge	Confederate States of America	American Civil War, Union blockade: The 20-ton schooner, carrying a cargo of sugar, hides, and mineral salts, was captured and destroyed at Sabine Pass, Louisiana several miles above the Calcasieu Pass Bar by boat crews from the gunboats USS Cayuga and USS Owasco (both United States Navy).
Torquay	United Kingdom	The schooner was driven ashore at Seaham, County Durham.

== 22 July ==
List of shipwrecks: 22 July 1863
Ship	State	Description
Gordon	United Kingdom	The brig was wrecked on Cape Sable Island, Nova Scotia, British North America. She was on a voyage from Saint John's, Newfoundland, British North America to an English port.
Heroine	United Kingdom	The schooner was driven ashore at Seaham, County Durham. Her crew survived. She was refloated on 24 July and taken in to Seaham in a severely damaged condition.
William and Catherine	United Kingdom	The brig was driven ashore and wrecked at Stockton-on-Tees, County Durham. Her crew were rescued. She was on a voyage from London to Stockton-on-Tees.

== 23 July ==
List of shipwrecks: 23 July 1863
Ship	State	Description
Elizabeth	United Kingdom	The ship ran aground on the Lymington Spit, in the Solent. She was on a voyage from the River Tyne to Cork. She was refloated.

== 24 July ==
List of shipwrecks: 24 July 1863
Ship	State	Description
Ida and Peter	United Kingdom	The ship ran aground off Ven, Sweden. She was on a voyage from Hartlepool, County Durham to Kronstadt, Russia.

== 25 July ==
List of shipwrecks: 25 July 1863
Ship	State	Description
Boston	United States	The 395-ton sidewheel paddle steamer burned at Moore′s Bar on the Ohio River near Portsmouth, Ohio.
Clarence	United Kingdom	The ship was severely damaged by fire at Dartmouth, Devon. She was on a voyage from Newcastle upon Tyne, Northumberland to Porto, Portugal.
Conceicão	Portugal	The ship collided with the steamships Iberia (Flag unknown) and Frankfort (United Kingdom) and was abandoned in the Atlantic Ocean. She was on a voyage from Terceira Island, Azores to Boston, Massachusetts, United States.
H. D. Mears, or H. Meares	Confederate States of America	American Civil War: The 338-ton sidewheel paddle steamer was scuttled by Confederate forces in the Sunflower River near Yazoo City, Mississippi, to prevent her capture by United States Navy forces.
Martha	Netherlands	The ship foundered in the Baltic Sea off "Seskoe". Her crew were rescued. She was on a voyage from Saint Petersburg, Russia to Stockholm, Sweden.
Pallion	United Kingdom	The brig ran aground on the Middelgrunden, near Copenhagen, Denmark.
Trim	United Kingdom	The barque ran aground on the Lymington Spit, in the Solent. She was on a voyage from Southampton, Hampshire to the Bristol Channel. She was refloated and put in to Lymington, Hampshire.

== 26 July ==
List of shipwrecks: 26 July 1863
Ship	State	Description
HMS Stromboli	Royal Navy	The Stromboli-class sloop was driven ashore on the south east coast of South America. Subsequently refloated, repaired and returned to service.

== 27 July ==
List of shipwrecks: 27 July 1863
Ship	State	Description
Abana	(United Kingdom of Great Britain and Ireland) British North America	The brig was abandoned in the Atlantic Ocean. Her crew were rescued. She was on a voyage from Belfast, County Antrim to Saint John, New Brunswick.
Corsair	United Kingdom	The brig was driven ashore on Dagö, Russia. She was on a voyage from Hartlepool, County Durham to Kronstadt, Russia. She had been refloated by 4 August.
Flavia	United Kingdom	The ship departed from New York for Queenstown, County Cork or Falmouth, Cornwall. No further trace, presumed foundered with the loss of all hands.
George Sand	United States	The ship was wrecked on the Pratas Shoal, in the South China Sea in a typhoon. All on board survived. She was on a voyage from San Francisco, California to Hong Kong.
Laurel	United Kingdom	The brig was driven ashore on Skagen, Denmark. She was on a voyage from Middlesbrough, Yorkshire to Kronstadt. She was consequently condemned.
Rose	United Kingdom	The barque was driven ashore on Malta and sank. She was on a voyage from Sunderland, County Durham to Malta. She was condemned.

== 28 July ==
List of shipwrecks: 28 July 1863
Ship	State	Description
Hildur	United Kingdom	The ship departed from New York, United States for Hayle, Cornwall. No further trace, presumed foundered with the loss of all hands.
Jane	United Kingdom	The brig was driven ashore and sank at Staithes, Yorkshire. She was on a voyage from Hartlepool, County Durham to London.
Paris	United Kingdom	The paddle steamer was approaching Saint Helier harbour on Jersey in the Channel Islands at the end of a voyage from Saint-Malo, France, with 24 passengers and 12 tons of cargo, chiefly butter and eggs, aboard under the control of a pilot when she struck on a rock known as Grune Vaudin. The engines were immediately stopped and at once set for astern and the lifeboats were ordered lowered. Ten minutes after the vessel struck, she went down in 30 feet (9 m) of water. Survivors were rescued by Wonder (United Kingdom).
Unidentified vessels	Confederate States of America	American Civil War, Union blockade: Various vessels were destroyed at New Smyrna, Florida, by the schooner USS Beauregard, the sidewheel paddle steamer USS Oleander, and boats from the schooner USS Para and the gunboat USS Sagamore (all United States Navy).

== 29 July ==
List of shipwrecks: 29 July 1863
Ship	State	Description
Acacia	(United Kingdom of Great Britain and Ireland) New Zealand	The barque was wrecked on the bar at the mouth of the Hokianga Harbour. All hands were saved.
St. George	United Kingdom	The ship departed from New York, United States for Weymouth, Dorset. No further trace, presumed foundered with the loss of all hands.

== 30 July ==
List of shipwrecks: 30 July 1863
Ship	State	Description
Laura	Austrian Empire	The brig caught fire at Montevideo, Uruguay and was scuttled. She was on a voyage from Liverpool, Lancashire, United Kingdom to Buenos Aires, Argentina.

== 31 July ==
List of shipwrecks: 31 July 1863
Ship	State	Description
Hawthorn	United Kingdom	The brig was wrecked near Main-à-Dieu, Cape Breton Island, Nova Scotia, British North America. She was on a voyage from Lisbon, Portugal to Miramichi, New Brunswick, British North America.
Janus	Bremen	The ship was wrecked in Palomas Bay. She was on a voyage from Bremen to Tenerife, Canary Islands.
Steadfast	United Kingdom	The barque ran aground off "Isle-au-Bois", Labrador, British North America. She was on a voyage from Quebec City, Province of Canada, British North America to Newcastle upon Tyne, Northumberland. She was consequently condemned.
Tasmania	United Kingdom	The ship ran aground on the Burbo Bank, in Liverpool Bay. She was on a voyage from Calcutta, India to Liverpool, Lancashire. She was refloated and towed in to Liverpool.

== Unknown date ==
List of shipwrecks: Unknown date in July 1863
Ship	State	Description
Adriana	United Kingdom	The ship was driven ashore on Seal Island, Nova Scotia, British North America before 22 July. She was on a voyage from Saint John's, Newfoundland, British North America to Liverpool, Lancashire. Adriana was refloated and put back to Saint John's in a waterlogged condition.
Amanda	United Kingdom	The ship was wrecked near "Lerwig", Denmark. She was on a voyage from Amsterdam, North Holland, Netherlands to Helsinki, Grand Duchy of Finland.
Ben McCulloch	Confederate States of America	American Civil War: The sternwheel paddle steamer was burned on Tchula Lake, Mississippi by Confederate States Army cavalry to prevent her capture by Union forces.
Boreas	United Kingdom	The ship was wrecked on Cape Sable Island, Nova Scotia before 18 July. She was on a voyage from New York, United States to Halifax, Nova Scotia.
Cotton Plant	Confederate States of America	American Civil War: The sternwheel paddle steamer was burned on the Tallahatchie River in Mississippi to prevent her capture by Union forces.
Dispatch	(United Kingdom of Great Britain and Ireland) British North America	The brigantine was wrecked on a reef off Anegada, Virgin Islands before 21 July. Her crew were rescued. She was on a voyage from Port Medway, Nova Scotia to Puerto Rico.
CSS Hart	Confederate States Army	American Civil War: Scuttled in Grand Lake in the vicinity of Camp Bisland on Bayou Teche in Louisiana on 14 April 1863 to prevent her capture by Union forces, the 175-ton ironclad sidewheel paddle steamer had almost been refloated by Confederate forces when she was scuttled again upon the appearance of U.S. Navy gunboats.
Hong Kong	Netherlands	The barque foundered before 29 July.
Index	United Kingdom	The ship was abandoned in the Atlantic Ocean. Her crew were rescued. She was on a voyage from Havana, Cuba to Liverpool.
Industry	United Kingdom	The ship was wrecked on the Isle of Whithorn, Wigtownshire. She was on a voyage from Maryport, Cumberland to Belfast, County Antrim.
J. S. Mort	United Kingdom	The steamship was abandoned in the Pacific Ocean before 15 July. She was on a voyage from Hokianga, New Zealand to Sydney, New South Wales.
Kentucky	United States	The brig was run into by RMS China (United Kingdom and sank at New York. Her crew survived.
Petrel	(United Kingdom of Great Britain and Ireland) Tobago	The drogher struck rocks and was wrecked at Tobago.
HMS Racoon	Royal Navy	The Pearl-class corvette ran aground in Loch Ness and was damaged. Subsequently repaired at Portsmouth, Hampshire.
Stag	United Kingdom	The ship was driven ashore at "Hock". She was on a voyage from Newcastle upon Tyne, Northumberland to Harfleur, Seine-Inférieure, France.
Three Brothers	(Russian Empire) Grand Duchy of Finland	The schooner ran aground in the Baltic Sea. She was on a voyage from Alafors, Sweden to Dundee, Forfarshire, United Kingdom. She was refloated and put in to Öregrund, Sweden, where she arrived on 26 July in a severely leaky condition.
Toulon	Chile	The barque was driven ashore at Coronel. Her crew were rescued.
Traveller	United Kingdom	The ship was wrecked at Berbice, British Guiana. She was on a voyage from Pará, Brazil to Jamaica.
Urgent	United Kingdom	The ship was driven ashore near Métis-sur-Mer, Province of Canada, British North America before 5 July. She was on a voyage from Quebec City, Province of Canada to Caernarfon. She was consequently condemned, but was refloated on 29 August and taken in to Malta.
Victor Jules	France	The ship was lost in the Raz de Sein. She was on a voyage from Paimbœuf, Loire-Inférieure to Cardiff, Glamorgan, United Kingdom.
