= Ravensbourne, New Zealand =

Suburb of Dunedin, New Zealand

Ravensbourne
- Suburb
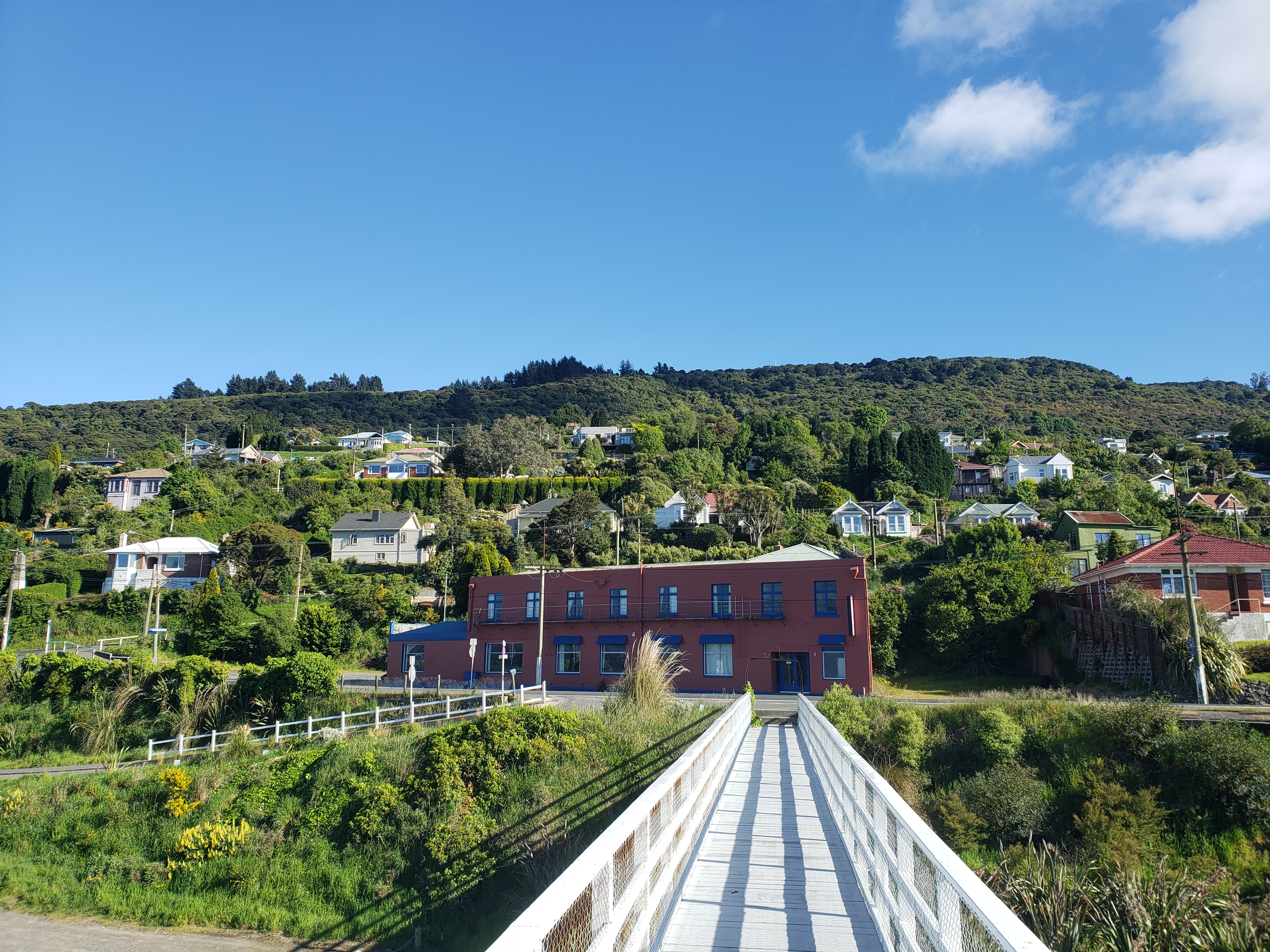
- View of Ravensbourne from the railway bridge
- Interactive map of Ravensbourne
- Coordinates: 45°52′S 170°33′E
- Country: New Zealand
- City: Dunedin
- Local authority: Dunedin City Council
- Community board: West Harbour Community

Area
  - Land: 187 ha (460 acres)

Population (2018 Census)
  - Total: 1,209
  - Density: 647/km^{2} (1,670/sq mi)

Opoho		St Leonards
	Ravenbourne
Dunedin Harbourside		(Otago Harbour)

Ravensbourne is a suburb of the New Zealand city of Dunedin. It is located on Otago Harbour on the steep southeastern slopes of Signal Hill. It lies on the harbour's northern shore, 4.5 kilometres (2.8 mi) east-northeast of the city centre.

== Geography and history ==
Rail and road links between central Dunedin and Port Chalmers run through Ravensbourne on the narrow strip of land between the hill slopes and harbour. A cycleway lies close to the harbour's edge, close to the rail line. Beginning in the final years of the twentieth century, this cycleway has extended to link many of the settlements along Otago Harbour's western shore. It begins close to the Forsyth Barr Stadium in North Dunedin, where it connects with Dunedin's cycleway network, and extends as far as Port Chalmers.

Ravensbourne takes its name from the property of the first mayor of West Harbour, Thomas De Lacy, who served as mayor from 1877 to 1878. In the area of De Lacy's property weka abounded, whose cockiness reminded De Lacy of the ravens in his native Scotland. The Māori name for the area is Kaitaki Tamariki, though this is rarely used as of 2020.

== West Harbour ==
Ravensbourne and the nearby suburbs of Maia, Burkes, and Saint Leonards, are often collectively referred to as West Harbour. Under this name, the area operated as a separate borough from 1877 until amalgamation with the city of Dunedin in 1963. Politically, the term now usually refers to the West Harbour Community Board, which represents those communities as well as Pūrākaunui, Aramoana, and the major harbourside townships of Port Chalmers and Sawyers Bay.

=== Maia and Burkes ===
The smaller settlements of Maia and Burkes lie on the coast of the harbour immediately to the northeast of Ravensbourne. Maia, basically a suburb of Ravensbourne, lies 1 kilometre (0.62 mi) to the northeast. Its name and pronunciation mean that it is often mistaken for a Māori name, though it was actually named for the Greek mythological daughter of Atlas, one of the Pleiades.

Burkes lies to the northeast of Maia, and consists of one long narrow road running roughly parallel with and above the highway. The most notable feature of Burkes is that the South Island Main Trunk railway crosses a series of causeways spanning some of the small bays which run along the harbour's edge. Some of these are now shared by the Otago Harbour Cycleway.

North of Burkes lies the larger settlement of Saint Leonards, which the early settler David Carey named for the English coastal town of St Leonards-on-Sea, Sussex - the birthplace of his wife.

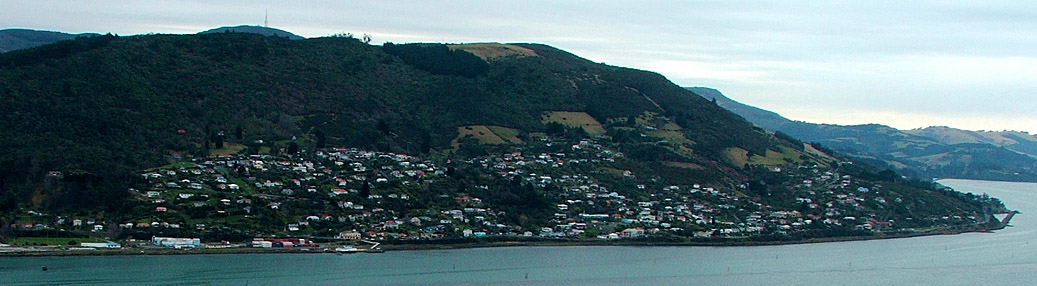
Ravensbourne and Maia appear in this view from Shiel Hill on the southern side of Otago Harbour. One of the railway causeways at Burkes is visible at the far right. The television transmitter on the top of Mount Cargill is visible behind Signal Hill in the background.

== Demographics ==
The suburb is mainly residential, but is dominated by two large industrial plants, the Logan Point Quarry and the Ravensdown Fertiliser factory, which is located at the harbour's edge at the southern end of the suburb.

Ravensbourne contains a significant number of smaller homes, quite a number of them occupied as flats by students from the University of Otago and Otago Polytechnic, which lie 2 kilometres (1.2 mi) to the west. The suburb clusters around the Dunedin-Port Chalmers highway (State Highway 88), and numerous narrow winding roads which climb the hill to its northwest. Above the suburb is Burns Park Scenic Reserve, which occupies much of the upper slopes of Signal Hill.

Ravensbourne and Maia cover 1.87 km^{2} (0.72 sq mi) and are part of the Ravensbourne-St Leonards statistical area.

Historical population for Ravensbourne and Maia
Year	Pop.	±% p.a.
2006	1,257	—
2013	1,224	−0.38%
2018	1,209	−0.25%

They had a population of 1,209 at the 2018 New Zealand census, a decrease of 15 people (−1.2%) since the 2013 census, and a decrease of 48 people (−3.8%) since the 2006 census. There were 492 households, comprising 615 males and 591 females, giving a sex ratio of 1.04 males per female, with 201 people (16.6%) aged under 15 years, 231 (19.1%) aged 15 to 29, 606 (50.1%) aged 30 to 64, and 168 (13.9%) aged 65 or older.

Ethnicities were 89.6% European/Pākehā, 10.2% Māori, 3.2% Pasifika, 4.7% Asian, and 3.7% other ethnicities. People may identify with more than one ethnicity.

Although some people chose not to answer the census's question about religious affiliation, 60.0% had no religion, 24.1% were Christian, 0.2% had Māori religious beliefs, 0.7% were Hindu, 0.7% were Muslim, 0.2% were Buddhist and 3.2% had other religions.

Of those at least 15 years old, 300 (29.8%) people had a bachelor's or higher degree, and 159 (15.8%) people had no formal qualifications. 162 people (16.1%) earned over $70,000 compared to 17.2% nationally. The employment status of those at least 15 was that 519 (51.5%) people were employed full-time, 162 (16.1%) were part-time, and 39 (3.9%) were unemployed.

=== Ravensbourne-St Leonards statistical area ===
Ravensbourne-St Leonards covers 4.91 km^{2} (1.90 sq mi) and had an estimated population of 1,980 as of June 2025, with a population density of 403 people per km^{2}.

Historical population for Ravensbourne-St Leonards
Year	Pop.	±% p.a.
2006	1,893	—
2013	1,896	+0.02%
2018	1,878	−0.19%

Ravensbourne-St Leonards had a population of 1,878 at the 2018 New Zealand census, a decrease of 18 people (−0.9%) since the 2013 census, and a decrease of 15 people (−0.8%) since the 2006 census. There were 756 households, comprising 933 males and 942 females, giving a sex ratio of 0.99 males per female. The median age was 44.6 years (compared with 37.4 years nationally), with 306 people (16.3%) aged under 15 years, 321 (17.1%) aged 15 to 29, 969 (51.6%) aged 30 to 64, and 282 (15.0%) aged 65 or older.

Ethnicities were 91.2% European/Pākehā, 9.3% Māori, 2.4% Pasifika, 4.0% Asian, and 3.4% other ethnicities. People may identify with more than one ethnicity.

The percentage of people born overseas was 22.5, compared with 27.1% nationally.

Although some people chose not to answer the census's question about religious affiliation, 60.2% had no religion, 25.7% were Christian, 0.2% had Māori religious beliefs, 0.6% were Hindu, 0.6% were Muslim, 0.3% were Buddhist and 3.5% had other religions.

Of those at least 15 years old, 534 (34.0%) people had a bachelor's or higher degree, and 213 (13.5%) people had no formal qualifications. The median income was $35,100, compared with $31,800 nationally. 297 people (18.9%) earned over $70,000 compared to 17.2% nationally. The employment status of those at least 15 was that 816 (51.9%) people were employed full-time, 267 (17.0%) were part-time, and 51 (3.2%) were unemployed.

== Education ==
Ravensbourne School is a state contributing primary school serving years 1 to 6 with a roll of 16 students as of July 2026. The school was founded in 1877.
