= Morvin's Landing =

Morvin's Landing, Indiana, also known as Morvin, was a town in Harrison County, Indiana along the Ohio River. Its position on the river made it an important stop on the Underground Railroad. The town was platted in 1816 and the last house was demolished in 1863. Morvin's Landing was located in Southern Harrison County, Indiana, along the Ohio River. Although nothing remains, Morvin's Landing Road is off of Highway 11, about 1.7 miles east of the Matthew E. Welsh Bridge.
