= 2015 Otago flood =

2015 flood in Otago, New Zealand

- Date: 3 June 2015
- Location: Dunedin, Otago
- Property damage: $138,000,000 ($12 million insurance payouts, $64 million economic damage, $18 million social damage)

On 3 June 2015, a low weather system brought heavy rain to the coastal Otago Region particularly South Dunedin. South Dunedin experienced heavy flooding, which was exacerbated by the area's high water table and the breakdown of the Portobello pumping station. 1,200 homes and businesses were damaged by flood damage. The Dunedin City Council (DCC) described the 3 June 2015 flood event as a "one in a 100 year" flood, with about 175mm of rain falling during a 24-hour period. The DCC subsequently drew criticism for the poor state of the city's storm water infrastructure.

== Background ==
=== Geological history ===
The South Dunedin plain was first formed about 18,000 years ago during the Last Glacial Period. At the time, the sea level was about 120 metres lower than today and the coastline stretched out as much as 35 km offshore further from its present extant. Following the Last Glacial Period, sea levels rose, reaching their present level about 7,000 years ago. The Otago Harbour was a former stream valley that was flooded during this period. During the post-glacial sea level rise, the South Dunedin plain was covered in ocean. A dune barrier was later formed between St Clair and Lawyers Head through the flow of fine sediment from the Clutha River and other smaller catchments. After the barrier formed, fine sediment accumulated in the waters at the head of the Otago Harbour, causing the sea in that area to became increasingly shallow. The gradual sediment accumulation led to the formation of a coastal wetland known as the South Dunedin plain, which also became a landbridge between the mainland South Island and the Otago Peninsula.

=== Human settlement and land reclaimation ===
At the time of European settlement during the mid-19th century, the South Dunedin plain still consisted of salt marshes, wetlands and lagoons. The local vegetation consisted of tussock, rushes and flax. Local Māori people referred to this wetland system as Kaituna (which translates as "eating eels") due to the significant presence of eels in the area. A shallow lagoon also terminated through the salt dunes near contemporary St Clair. This flat coastal area functioned as a drainage basin for the hilly, catchment area that formed the rest of Dunedin. European settlers referred to this area as "The Flat." Since most of Dunedin is hilly, houses were initially built on the slopes of the extinct Dunedin Volcano. As the city's population grew during the Otago gold rush, European settlers began reclaiming swampy land in "The Flat." The land was filled using sand from the coastal dunes of St Kilda. Consequently, much of South Dunedin was built on land consisting of soft, sandy sediment that was only slightly above the water table (which was up to 17 cm lower than the present day).

During the late 19th century, marram grass was planted and sand-catching structures were also built along Ocean Beach, creating high sand dunes south of present-day Victoria Road that runs across St Kilda and St Clair. To accommodate the expansion of housing in South Dunedin, drainage of the wet lands through the dunes was blocked off to prevent storm tides from coming in through these dunes. During the 1960s and 1970s, further land reclamation occurred between Andersons Bay Road and Portsmouth Drive through the use of dredging spoil excavated from Otago Harbour. This reclaimed land was used predominantly for commercial activity and including a pumping station on Portobello Road. Land reclamation, human settlement, and the laying of asphalt and concrete for building roads and buildings in South Dunedin has disrupted the natural drainage basin by preventing water from seeping into the ground. In 2019, Stuff journalist Charlie Mitchell estimated that 60% of South Dunedin was impervious, with some pockets reporting 100%.

=== Natural disaster risks ===
During the 1923 New Zealand Storm, heavy rain on 21 April led to extensive flooding in Caversham, New Zealand, South Dunedin, and St Kilda between 22 and 23 April. In addition, low-lying portions of the central and northern areas of Central Dunedin and North East Valley also experienced flooding in 1923. South Dunedin is also at risk of earthquake shaking and liquefaction due to several geographical faults including the Akatore Fault, which is situated between the Taieri Plains and Taieri Mouth. Due to its coastal location, South Dunedin is also vulnerable to sea level rise caused by climate change.

=== Socio-economic demographics ===
South Dunedin has also historically experienced a high degree of socio-economic deprivation, with parts of the suburb ranking in the bottom 10 percent of the deprivation index. While the median personal income in South Dunedin is NZ$20,100, some pockets reported a record low median income of NZ$14,000. Due to its low-quality housing stock, South Dunedin also reported a high level of residents living in rental homes including low-income earners, people experiencing mental health and emotional issues, and recent migrants. Due to its flat landscape, South Dunedin also reported a significant number of residents using wheelchairs.

== Flood event ==
On 3 June 2015, the coastal parts of the Otago region in the South Island experienced heavy rainfall and high tide, which raised the level of height of the ground water and led to flooding. During the 24 hour period leading to 3pm on 3 June, Dunedin City Council (DCC) civil defence manager estimated that 90–95 mm of rain had fallen in the Dunedin area. The DCC described the June flood event as a "one in a 100 year flood," with about 175mm of rain falling in the 24 hour period between 4 am on 3 June and 4 am on 4 June, exceeding the "one in a 100 year flood" level which was 120mm over 24 hours.

The worst affected suburbs were South Dunedin, Kaikorai Valley, the Brighton coast, the Taieri Plain, North Road and parts of Mosgiel. In response to the rainfall and flooding, residents erected sandbags to protect their properties and businesses. St Clair and Bathgate Park primary schools also sent their pupils home in response to the flooding.

By 12:40 pm, Pine Hill had recorded over 60mm of rain in the past 24 hours. Heavy rain also caused several rivers and streams in North Otago, Dunedin, South Otago and upper Taieri Plain including the Silver Stream, Kaikorai Stream, the Water of Leith, and Lindsay Creek to rise rapidly. Flooding was reported in Kaikorai Valley road, the Gordon Road spillway, and parts of the Taieri Plain and North East Valley. In addition, heavy rainfall caused leaks at several Dunedin Hospital properties, with a blocked city main causing flooding at the Hospital's Lower Ground loading dock.

By noon, MetService duty forecaster Emma Blake reported that 70mm of rain had fallen in coastal Otago during the morning. The meteorological service maintained a heavy rain warning for Dunedin and the Clutha District until 2am on 4 June but forecast that rain would slowly begin easing overnight. Blake forecast that Dunedin would receive a further 80 to 100 mm of rainfall.

The rain eased on 4 June, with Dunedin receiving a total of 175 mm of rain over the past 24 hours. South Dunedin was the hardest hit area, with Labour Member of Parliament for Dunedin South, Claire Curran, describing the suburb as a "major disaster area."

== Impact ==
=== Dunedin ===
The heavy rainfall and flooding strained Dunedin's stormwater and sewage systems and road network. By 10:30 am on 3 June, the DCC Water and Waste Network Contracts Manager Mike Ind confirmed that stormwater and sewers in the Hillside Road and Surrey Street areas had reached capacity. By 4pm on 3 February, nine roads around the wider Dunedin area had been closed. New Zealand Transport Agency (NZTA) urged people to avoid traveling on roads and highways around Dunedin. The NZTA also advised people to avoid travelling on the Dunedin Southern Motorway between Dunedin city centre and Mosgiel. In addition, foul sewer contamination had led to the closure of Hargest Crescent road area. Radio New Zealand later revised the number of affected roads to 15.

By 3 June, Radius Fulton rest home on Dunedin's Hillside Road had been evacuated due to flooding. While some of Radius Fulton's 94 residents managed to seek shelter with family, the rest home had to arrange alternative accommodation for 78 residents. Multiple slips were also reported in the Otago peninsula including Taiaroa Head, which obstructed travel in the area. Two drivers also escaped after their cars were swallowed up by a sinkhole in the Otago peninsula.

=== East Taieri ===
In response to surface flooding, power utilities company Aurora Energy cut power to 160 homes in the East Taieri area until the floodwaters subside and power could be safely restored, affecting 517 consumers. By 4 June, Auroa Energy had restored power to the affected homes.

=== South Otago ===
Surface flooding was also reported in the Clutha District, leading to the closure of several roads including Lakeside Road at the railway underbridge, Akatore Road at Big Creek, Papatowai Highway at Caberfeidh Hill, Karoro Creek, Mt Wallace Road, Back Road, Springfield Road, Allison Road, and Remote Road.

=== Central Otago ===
Flooding also occurred on parts of State Highway 8 between the Lindis Pass and Cromwell in Central Otago.

=== Tasman-Nelson region ===
Over 50mm of rain fell in the Tasman–Nelson region of the upper South Island between the mornings of 2 and 3 June 2015, resulting in properties and paddocks being flooded. In addition, Cable Bay near Nelson experienced heavy rain and flooding.

== Responses ==
=== Emergency response ===
In response to the flooding, emergency services established an operations centre at the civil defence bunker in Dunedin Central to coordinate their response to the various flooding events across Dunedin. On 4 June, Fire Service personnel also commenced pumping activities throughout South Dunedin. The Southern District Health Board (SDHB) also established an emergency operations centre to ensure that staff were able to travel safely to and from work. The SDHB also assisted several age residential care facilities in Dunedin including finding placement breaks.

During the June flood event, Civil Defence Controller Ruth Stokes confirmed that Civil Defence's Dunedin call centre had received over 3,000 calls over the last 24 hours. On 4 June, Civil Defence visited over 200-flood damaged properties. On 4 June the Fire Service also responded to 345 events, with 90% being in the South Dunedin area. 20 additional Police officers were deployed in South Dunedin to deter looting. In addition, Fire Service Area Commander Lawrence Voight confirmed that firefighters had responded to 130 calls for assistance.

The New Zealand Army was also placed on alert in Mosgiel in the event that the Silver Stream burst its banks. On 3 June, an Army Unimog was used to evacuate children from the flood-stricken Abbotsford School. The Army also helped volunteers sandbag 100 homes in the coastal Dunedin suburb of St Kilda in response to flooding. Houses in South Dunedin's Cutten Street were evacuated with New Zealand Red Cross volunteers visiting households to conduct wellness chats.

=== Local government ===
On 3 June, the Civil Defence Welfare Committee and Dunedin City Council also established a welfare centre at South Dunedin Presbyterian Church to provide advice and assistance to affected residents. The New Zealand Red Cross, Police and DCC also visited residences and properties in flood-affected areas of Dunedin to provide safety and welfare checks. The DCC and emergency services also discouraged motorists from driving in flood-affected areas to avoid creating "bow waves" that push flood waters into properties.

On 4 June, Mayor of Dunedin Dave Cull established a mayoral fund to assist flood victims. He stated that the DCC's priority was to get people's flood homes dried and habitable, which would take a few days. The Council also settled displaced residents in motels. Since several roads in the Dunedin area had been damaged by the flood, the DCC and Civil Defence appealed for volunteers to assist with sandbagging, sweeping streets and cleaning homes.

=== Schools and colleges ===
As a result of the flooding, all primary and intermediate schools in Dunedin, and early childhood centres affiliated with the Dunedin Kindergarten Association (DKA) closed on 3 June. In addition, Taieri College in Mosgiel and King's High School and Queen's High School in South Dunedin closed. However, Otago Polytechnic's Dunedin campus remained opened.

== Aftermath ==
=== Damages ===
In 2017, a University of Otago study estimated that at least 800 homes in the South Dunedin area had been flooded. In 2019, Stuff journalist Charlie Mitchell estimated that around 1,200 homes and businesses in South Dunedin had been damaged by water. The insurance company IAG New Zealand estimated that total flood damage amounted to NZ$138 million (including NZ$28 million in insurance payouts, NZ$64 million in economic damage, and NZ$18 million in social damage).

=== Criticism of the Dunedin City Council ===
The Dunedin City Council attracted criticism from local residents including Neil Ivory for failing to maintain drain systems, which worsened the impact of the flooding in parts of Dunedin. In response, DCC road maintenance Peter Stranding said that the city's stormwater system had reached saturation point and could only cope with a certain level of rain. He stated that the mud tanks were full to capacity and discharging onto Dunedin's roading network.

On 21 June 2016, the DCC admitted during a public meeting that a faulty pumping station had made the flood in South Dunedin 20cm deeper. DCC chief executive Sue Bidrose told members of the public that the flooding was caused more by heavy rainfall than an overwhelmed stormwater system. In response, the Council had repaired the pumping station, cleared all drains and mud tanks in South Dunedin, and adopted new procedures to deal with heavy rain. Mayor Cull drew criticism for not attending the public meeting since he was visiting China. In response to allegations from the South Dunedin Action Group that the DCC was planning to abandon South Dunedin and blame it on climate change, Bidrose stated that the Council had invested NZ$5 million in the South Dunedin community hub, NZ$500,000 in a local hockey turf, and was planning to expand the local Gasworks Museum.

In September 2016, the DCC and Otago Regional Council (ORC) launched a series of eight public meetings to discuss the impact of the 2015 flood in South Dunedin and to discuss future planning. Attendees were shown a presentation on the environmental history of South Dunedin and the impact of climate change. Local government officials including ORC director for engineering, hazards and science Gavin Palmer and DCC chief executive Bidrose fronted these talks.

=== Climate change adaptation ===
On 20 November 2015, a report released by Parliamentary Commissioner for the Environment Jan Wright on rising sea levels estimated that 2,800 homes and businesses in South Dunedin were at risk from sea level rises of half a metre caused by climate change. Of this figure, 2,700 homes lay less than 50cm of the high tide mark, with over 70% being situated lower than half that elevation. Due to climate change, rising global temperatures were forecast to melt ice caps, causing sea levels to rise and creating more storms and flooding. In response to the report, Mayor Cull described rising sea levels as a serious issue facing South Dunedin due to its high population density and older, poorer population.

In response to the 2015 Otago flood, the DCC launched a series of workshops in March 2021 to seek community feedback on the future of the South Dunedin coastline between St Clair and St Kilda.

On 25 February 2023, Victoria University of Wellington emeritus professor of public policy Dr Jonathan Boston identified Dunedin as vulnerable to rising sea levels in the near future due to climate change. In the wake of the 2023 Auckland Anniversary Weekend floods and Cyclone Gabrielle, Boston advocated a managed retreat strategy for flood-prone and low-lying areas including South Dunedin, which would involve property buyouts and cooperation between central and local governments.

On 23 June 2023, the DCC's South Dunedin Future programme manager Jonathan Rowe confirmed that the Council was discussing plans to deal with climate change-related challenges facing South Dunedin including rising groundwater, rising sea levels, and increased rainfall. Rowe confirmed that the DCC was considering managed retreat as an option. He clarified that it did not mean abandoning the suburb but potentially strategically evacuating from some areas and intensifying development in other areas. While St Clair Action Group co-chair Richard Egan expressed support for the DCC's planning process for South Dunedin, Ray Macleod of the Greater South Dunedin Action Group criticised managed retreat as amounting to an abandonment of the community.

On 5 September, Mayor of Dunedin Jules Radich confirmed that the DCC had commenced talks with the New Zealand Treasury to secure funding to purchase properties in flood-prone parts of South Dunedin as part of the Council's climate adaptation strategy.

On 29 November 2023, the Otago Daily Times reported that Kāinga Ora had paused funding for building new homes in South Dunedin due to its geographical vulnerability to flooding, erosion, and other natural hazards. On 30 November, the South Dunedin Future Programme proposed 16 options for helping South Dunedin adapt to climate change including designing roads and parks to be floodable, land elevation, waterproofing the ground floor of buildings, restricting development in flood-prone areas, creating water detention basins, elevating the level of houses, and modifying drainage systems.

=== Legacy ===
In early August 2025, the Dunedin Symphony Orchestra performed the world première of This rising tide, these former wetlands by composer and musician Nathaniel Otley at the King's and Queen's Performing Arts Centre. The performance, conducted by Brent Stewart, marked the tenth anniversary of the 2015 Otago floods. To prepare for the symphony, Otley used a grant from Creative New Zealand to research reports on the South Dunedin floods and the area's history. He also incorporated interviews from flood survivors into the performance.
