= Forsyth Barr Stadium =

Multi-purpose stadium in Dunedin

- 'Glass House'

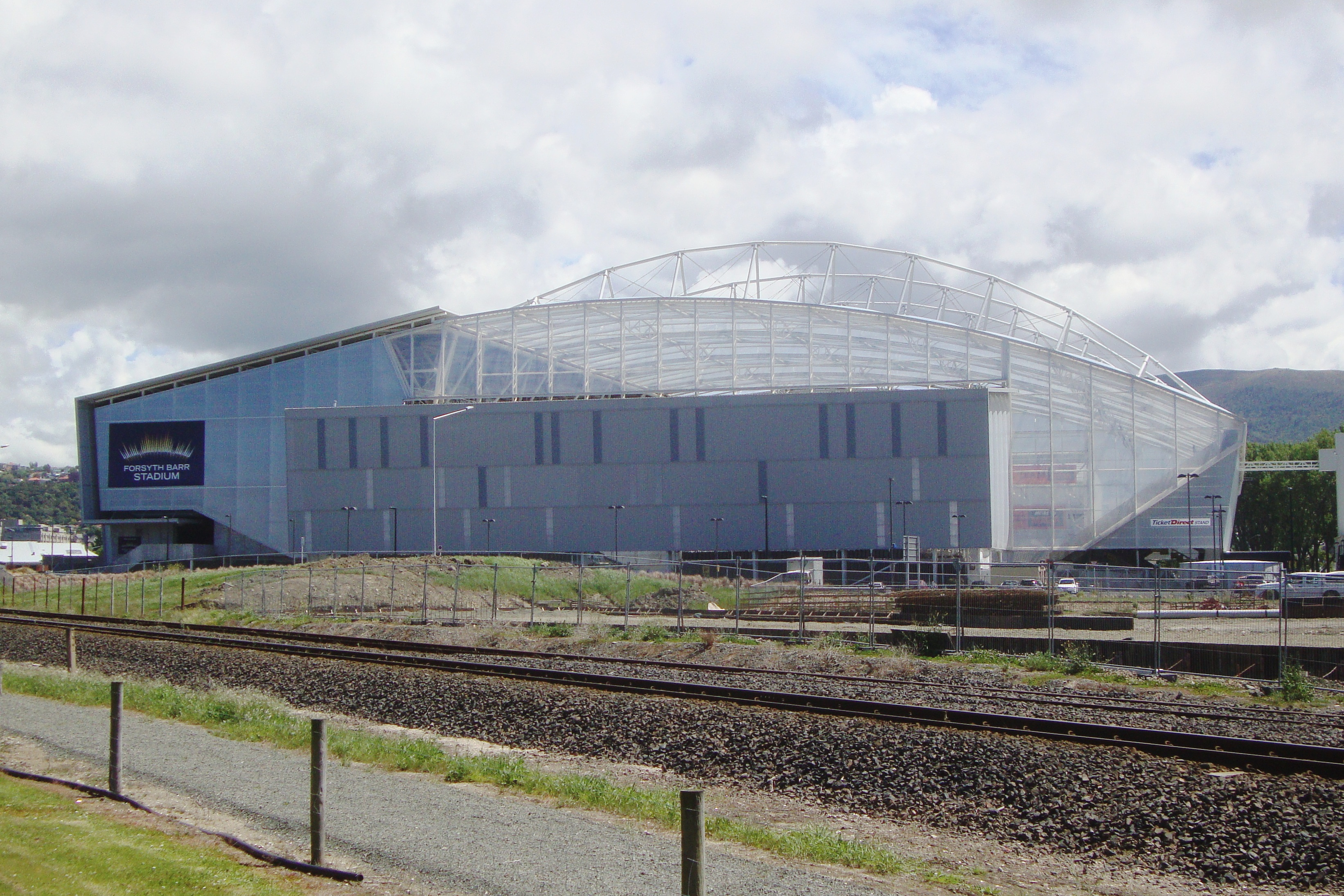
- View of the stadium from the south-east
- Interactive map of Forsyth Barr Stadium
- Full name: Forsyth Barry Stadium
- Former names: New Carisbrook; Dunedin Stadium; Awatea Street Stadium; Otago Stadium
- Location: Anzac Avenue, Logan Park, Dunedin, Otago, New Zealand
- Coordinates: 45°52′9″S 170°31′28″E
- Owner: Dunedin City Council
- Operator: Dunedin Venues Management Ltd
- Capacity: 30,748 (Rugby/Football); 36,000 (Concerts); 15,000 (Rodeo)
- Roof: Domed
- Surface: Desso GrassMaster
- Record attendance: 37,000 (Concert: Pink; March 5, 2024)

Construction
- Groundbreaking: May 2009
- Built: 2009-2011
- Opened: 5 August 2011; 15 years ago
- Cost: NZ$ 198.3 million
- Architects: Jasmax; Populous

Tenants
- Otago (2011–); Highlanders (2012–); Southern United FC (2011–)

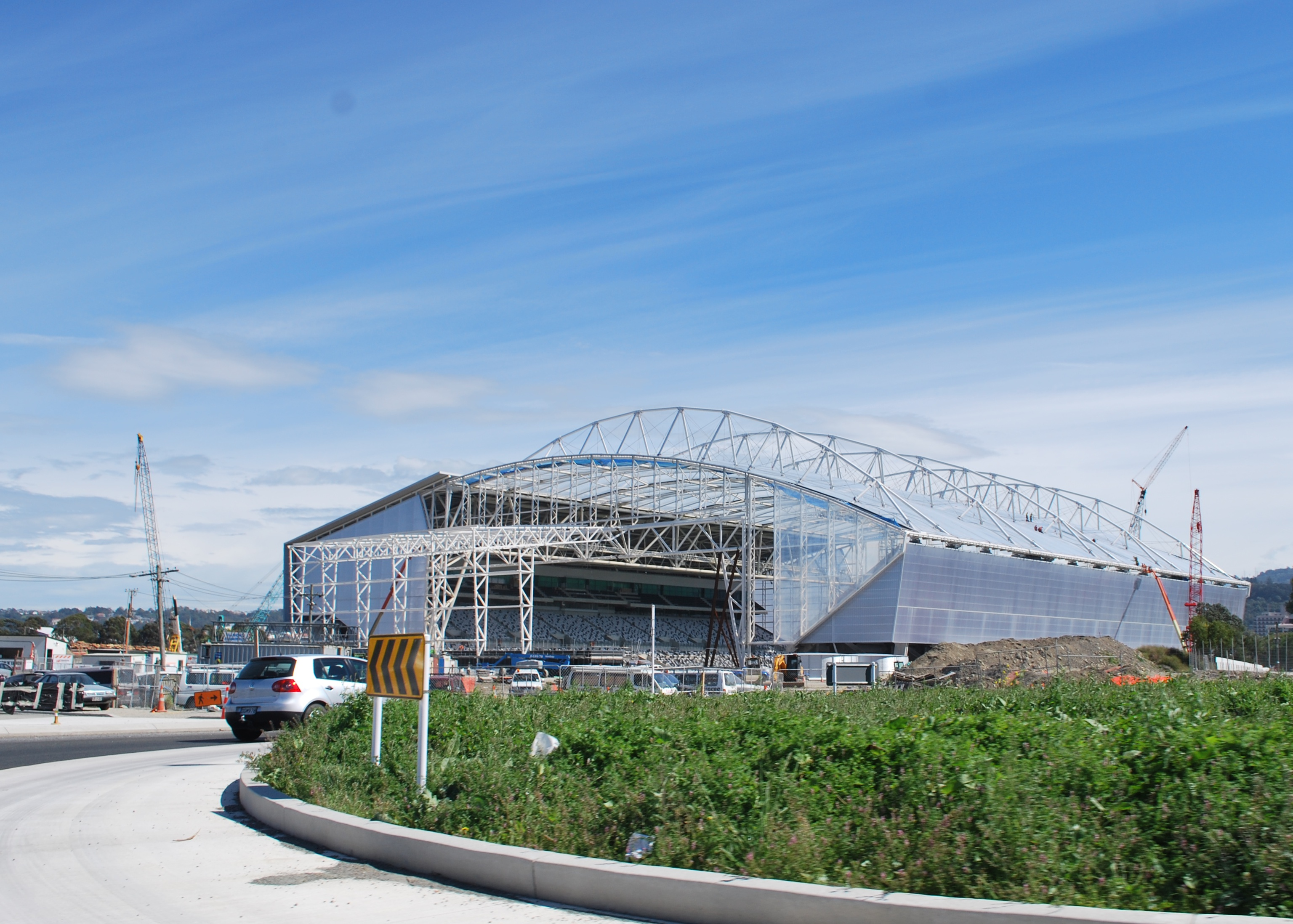
Outside view of the stadium.

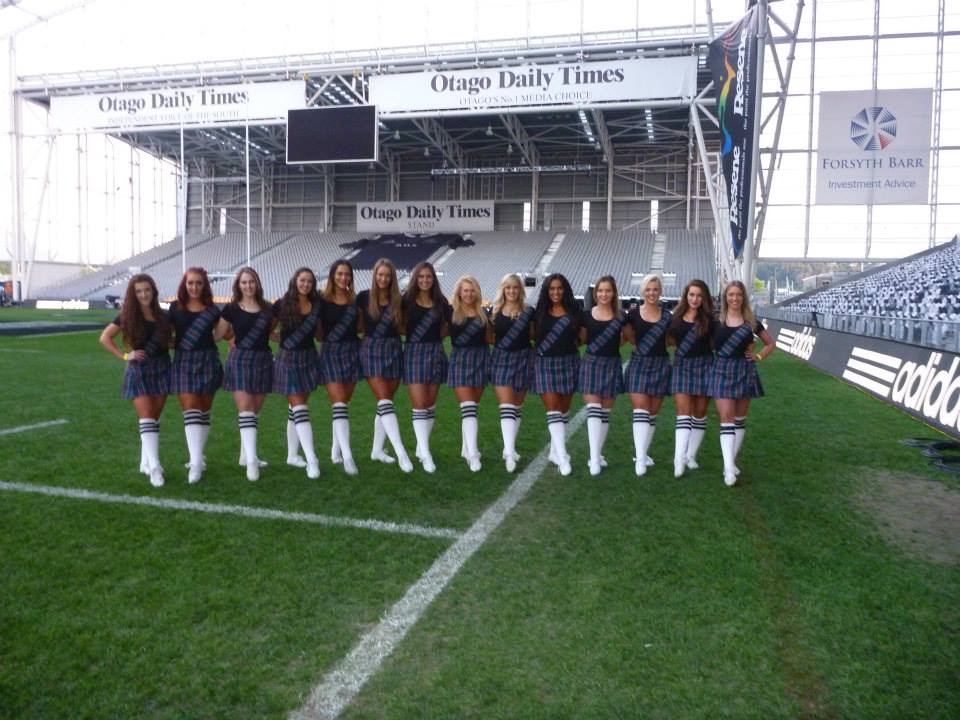
Otago Dancers practice for a performance at the Bledisloe Cup.

Forsyth Barr Stadium is a multi-purpose stadium in Dunedin, New Zealand. At various stages of development it was also known as Dunedin Stadium or Awatea Street Stadium, or its non-commercial official name during the 2011 Rugby World Cup and 2015 FIFA U-20 World Cup, Otago Stadium. The fully covered stadium is also known colloquially as 'The Glasshouse' due to its resemblance to a horticultural hothouse.

The stadium was opened by New Zealand Prime Minister John Key on 5 August 2011, replacing Carisbrook as the home stadium of the Highlanders team in Super Rugby and the Otago Rugby Football Union team in the domestic Mitre 10 Cup. The stadium hosted four matches of the 2011 Rugby World Cup, and has hosted major music tours, starting in November 2011 with Elton John. The venue hosted multiple matches for the 2023 FIFA Women's World Cup.

== Location ==
The stadium is located in Dunedin North, close to the outflow of the Water of Leith into Otago Harbour (and directly over the outflow of Opoho Stream). Its site is close to several other major sports venues. Logan Park lies immediately to the north, and the University Oval and the Caledonian Ground are also nearby to the north of the stadium. Also to the north of the stadium is Logan Point quarry, at the foot of Signal Hill.

To the west, the stadium's near neighbours include Otago Polytechnic and the University of Otago College of Education. The main campus of the University of Otago lies one kilometre to the west.

The stadium's construction required the shifting of New Zealand State Highway 88, the main road between the CBD to the West Harbour Suburbs and the port facilities, which prior to stadium construction followed Anzac Avenue as part of its route, turning northeast at Logan Park before following the harbour's edge past Ravensbourne. The highway was diverted onto a new stretch of road alongside the railway line, 200 metres east of Anzac Avenue. Several roads located close to the mouth of the Leith were either covered over by the new construction (Leander Street and Awatea Street) or had their routes considerably altered (Magnet Street and Parry Street). A new street, Neptune Street, was built to link remaining stretches of Magnet and Parry Streets, and connects with SH88 at a newly built roundabout immediately to the east of the stadium.

== Design ==
The stadium was designed by Populous and Jasmax in a joint venture. The stadium roof was constructed with a clear ETFE roof supplied and installed by the firm Vector Foiltec, the same material as used at Allianz Arena in Munich and the Water Cube in Beijing.

The stadium was designed as a versatile venue, and is expected to be able to host a range of events including sports (rugby union, rugby league, football, basketball, netball), concerts, trade fairs and other large-scale events. The use of relocatable seating allows for flexibility to suit a range of event requirements. Due to size constraints, some sports (such as cricket, a popular sport in New Zealand) are unable to use the stadium.

It has a maximum seated capacity of 30,748 in a full sports mode, and capacity in excess of 36,000 for concerts. There are permanent stands in the South and North with removable seating in East and West Stand areas. The West Stand Area, officially called the Mitre 10 Mega Stand, is also known as the Zoo and is popular with the student population.

=== Roof ===
Internal roof height at centre line: 37 metres
Highest observed rugby kick 29.4m
External roof height 47 metres (equivalent to a 12-storey building)
Football goal posts: 16 metres

The roof is covered with 20,500m^{2} of ETFE (ethylene tetrafluoroethylene) transparent roofing material (also used in the Eden Project, England and the Beijing Cube, China). Rainwater is collected from the 20,500m^{2} roof surface and recycled to irrigate the pitch.

The roof, supported by 5 steel trusses each spanning 105 metres, is capable of supporting the weight of a car. The main truss (South Stand) is 130 metres long and weighs 390 tonnes.

=== Turf ===
Real grass is strengthened by synthetic grass fibres injected deep into the soil. This increases the hard-wearing capability, allowing 3 times the use of natural grass field. The turf is serviced by 2.5 km of drainage, 15 km of irrigation and 40 automated sprinkler heads. It consists of three different types of seed, 3200m3 of sand, soil and compost in three different layers.

Due to the perceived high cost of maintaining the turf, proposals have been made to replace the grass/artificial turf with a 100% artificial turf, which would limit the attractiveness of the venue for high earning events like rugby test matches (for which the stadium was initially proposed to replace Carisbrook).

== Construction ==
Hawkins Construction began work on the site during May 2009. It was completed in August 2011.

During construction, 609 piles were driven to support stadium structure, and 1840m3 concrete poured in North and South stand seating areas. Construction work produced 22,000m3 of excavated fill – much from buildings demolished to make way for the stadium. Over 3,200 tonnes of structural steel and 2,000 tonnes of reinforced steel were used.

The stadium contains 318 toilets and 260 metres of urinals. It houses 12 food and beverage stalls. The grounds are lighted by 220 two-kilowatt sports lights.

At least 600 people were employed in new jobs created by the stadium's construction and fit out. Changes to State Highway 88 proposed prior to the stadium proposal were amended to accommodate the proposed new structure. Construction of the revamped highway was completed in mid-2011.

== Opposition ==
The Forsyth Barr Stadium project was met with significant opposition within Dunedin, with objections focusing largely on the expected cost of a stadium that may find limited use. After prolonged deliberation, the Dunedin City Council on 17 March 2008 voted 12–2 in favour of proceeding with the project.

A telephone survey of 2,200 residents run by the Dunedin City Council in early 2007 showed 51.9% thought the council should pay for the project, and larger mail-out surveys by the city and Otago Regional council showed around 40%. A November 2008 survey organised by Stop the Stadium showed 73.3% of respondents did not support public funding.

Two legal proceedings were taken separately against the Dunedin City Council and Otago Regional Council, attempting to stop funding the stadium with public money. The Otago Regional Council won the case against it in the Dunedin High Court, and the Dunedin City Council won both the High Court proceedings, and subsequent Court of Appeal hearing.

Within a year of opening, stadium critics claimed evidence was published that supported the objections to the stadium being built; sources include the Dunedin City Council, some of its councillors, and associated sporting bodies.

== Funding ==
Originally the total cost of the stadium including land purchases was projected to be NZ$198.3 million. The following contributors make up the original total funding of the project:

- Otago Regional Council $37.5 million
- Community Trust of Otago $7.0 million
- University of Otago $10.0 million
- Government $15.0 million
- Dunedin City Council $98.5 million

The non-forensic audit of total cost to construct found the original budget was exceeded, and that Papers for Council were unnecessarily complicated – final disclosed stadium costs were $206.4m plus $18m interest for a total cost of $224.4m

The Carisbrook Stadium Trust began purchasing the required land on 31 July 2008, with remaining settlements on 31 October 2008. The final cost of the land was $32.5 million, significantly above the original budget of $20 million, but the trust expected to make some money back from the sale of surplus land and materials from the demolition.

== Sport ==
=== Rugby union ===
Forsyth Barr Stadium replaced Carisbrook as the home stadium of the Highlanders team in Super Rugby in late 2011, with the stadium in use from the beginning of the 2012 Super Rugby season. The first Super Rugby match played at the stadium, on 3 March 2012, resulted in a narrow win for the Highlanders over local derby rivals the Crusaders. The stadium also became the new home of the Otago Rugby Football Union team in the domestic ITM Cup, since renamed Bunnings NPC.

The stadium hosted four matches of the 2011 Rugby World Cup, three of them featuring England, with the first being played on 10 September 2011 against Argentina. For sponsorship reasons, the ground was known as Otago Stadium during the tournament.

The All Blacks played their inaugural test at Forsyth Barr Stadium against South Africa on 15 September 2012, the home side winning 21–11.

=== Association football ===
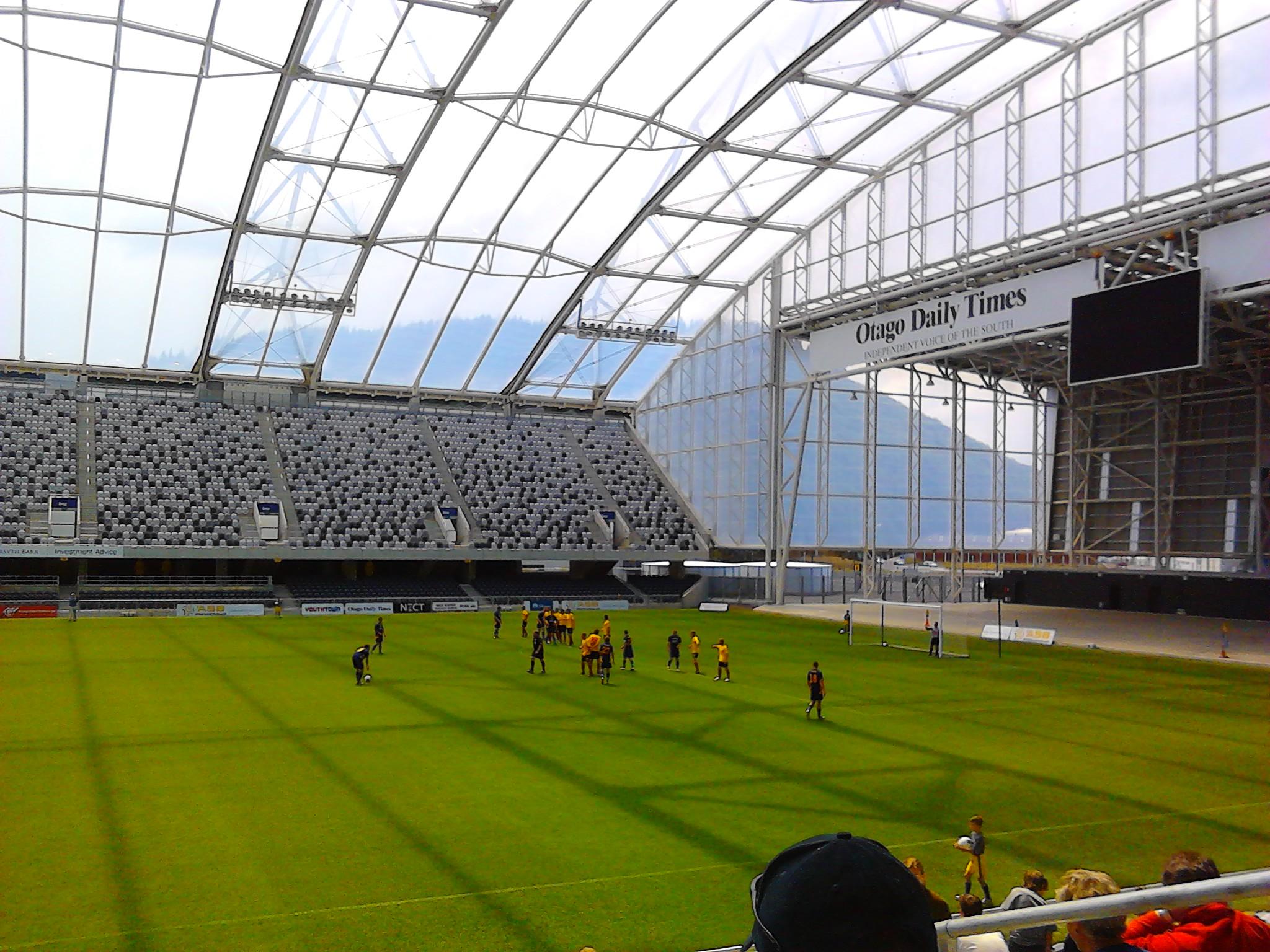
A football match being played in the Forsyth Barr Stadium between Otago United and Waikato FC in the 2011–12 ASB Premiership

The stadium's inaugural game was a pre-season football match between the Wellington Phoenix and Brisbane Roar on 20 August 2011, with an attendance of over 15,000 (half of capacity). This was followed on 14 December 2011 as the Phoenix hosted the same opposition in an A-League regional round fixture, with an attendance of only 4,628. The stadium has also hosted the local ASB Premiership football team Otago United for some of their home matches in the 2011–12 season.

Forsyth Barr Stadium served as one of the venues for the 2015 FIFA U-20 World Cup, hosting six Group Stage matches and one match in the Round of 16.

The venue was one of the venues for the 2023 FIFA Women's World Cup.

Date	Team #1	Result	Team #2	Stage	Attendance
21 July 2023	Philippines	0–2	Switzerland	Group A	13,711
23 July 2023	Netherlands	1–0	Portugal	Group E	11,991
26 July 2023	Japan	2–0	Costa Rica	Group C	6,992
28 July 2023	Argentina	2–2	South Africa	Group G	8,834
30 July 2023	Switzerland	0–0	New Zealand	Group A	25,947
1 August 2023	Vietnam	0–7	Netherlands	Group E	8,215

=== Rugby league ===
The stadium hosted a pre-season rugby league match between National Rugby League sides the New Zealand Warriors and Brisbane Broncos on 23 February 2013. The game attracted 15,000 spectators, with the Warriors prevailing 16–10. The quality of the stadium was an important factor in attracting the game to the city. The match was the first time the Warriors had played in Dunedin.

In round 3 of the 2017 NRL season on 17 March, the Canterbury-Bankstown Bulldogs defeated the New Zealand Warriors 24–12 in front of 10,238 spectators in the first NRL game in Dunedin for premiership points.

The stadium has hosted one New Zealand rugby league international, against England in week 3 of the 2014 Four Nations on 8 November 2014. New Zealand beat England 16–14 in front of 15,863 spectators.

== Other uses ==
=== Concerts ===
The stadium has hosted musical performances by international artists starting with Elton John in November 2011. Other notable acts to have performed at the stadium include Macklemore (2013), Aerosmith (2013), Paul Simon (2013), Tinie Tempah (2014), Rod Stewart (2015), Neil Diamond (2015), Fleetwood Mac (2015), Black Sabbath (2016), Stevie Nicks (2017), Roger Waters (2018), Robbie Williams (2018), and Ed Sheeran (2018). It also hosted Kendrick Lamar, Shania Twain, and P!nk during 2018. The Eagles, Fleetwood Mac, Elton John & Queen + Adam Lambert performed at the stadium between 2019 and 2020. Live music returned to the venue after the pandemic with shows from Red Hot Chili Peppers supported by Post Malone, Rod Stewart and Cyndi Lauper in 2023.

Ed Sheeran's three concerts during his 2018 tour set a new record for concerts in Dunedin, pulling in an audience between them of 108,000 people, with almost 70,000 of those attending coming from outside the city. On 5 March 2024, P!nk returned to the stadium for her Summer Carnival, performing of a record-breaking crowd of over 37,000 fans.

=== University of Otago ===
The Forsyth Barr Stadium was partly funded by the University of Otago, and several university facilities are nearby or part of the complex, including the UNIPOL gymnasium complex (which was funded, and initially owned, by University of Otago, Otago University Students' Association and Otago Polytechnic Students' Association), academic work and lecture spaces, and support facilities. The stadium is connected to the university, of which the main campus is 1000 metres to the northwest, by a series of landscaped areas, and a dedicated university building, University Plaza Building One, lies adjacent to the stadium.

=== Community use ===
The stadium's facilities are available to hire for public and private events.

== See also ==
- List of stadiums in New Zealand
- Lists of stadiums
