= State Highway 88 (New Zealand) =

Road in New Zealand

State Highway 88

Route information
- Maintained by NZ Transport Agency Waka Kotahi
- Length: 12.7 km (7.9 mi)

Major junctions
- Southwest end: SH 1 (Cumberland Street (northbound)/Castle Street (southbound)) at Dunedin
- Northeast end: Port Chalmers

Location
- Country: New Zealand

Highway system
- New Zealand state highways; Motorways and expressways; List
← SH 87	→ SH 90

State Highway 88 (SH 88) is a New Zealand State Highway connecting the city centre of Dunedin with Port Chalmers, which is the location of Dunedin's main port facilities and home of one of New Zealand's major container terminals. It is roughly 12 km long.

== Route ==
SH 88 departs from SH 1 at the corner of St. Andrew Street and Castle Street, close to Dunedin's city centre. The highway travels briefly east before turning northeast at a major intersection to follow Anzac Avenue. After some 400 metres, the highway is diverted onto a new stretch of road opened in 2011 to bypass the Forsyth Barr Stadium. At this point the highway crosses the Water of Leith, close to the point at which it empties into Otago Harbour. To the northwest of the stadium it joins Ravensbourne Road, passing along the northwestern shore of Otago Harbour through Ravensbourne, Maia, and Saint Leonards. Much of this journey is relatively flat, though there are some undulating sections between Maia and St Leonards. This is in marked contrast to the surrounding countryside, which is steeply sloping; the highway passes along the foothills of Signal Hill during much of its course, on a narrow coastal strip shared by the South Island Main Trunk railway and the Otago Harbour Cycleway.

North of St Leonards the highway passes through a low saddle at the isthmus of the small Roseneath Peninsula. A major intersection to the north of this connects the highway with the main road of Sawyer's Bay. The highway continues its undulating course, passing under a viaduct carrying the South Island Main Trunk railway before entering Port Chalmers, where it changes name to George Street. The highway terminates at the intersection of five roads close to the gates of the container port.

== Route changes ==
Prior to the building of the Forsyth Barr Stadium in 2011, SH 88 traversed the length of Anzac Avenue, veering east onto Ravensbourne Road at the edge of Logan Park. Realignment of a 1.2 km stretch of the highway, including a new bridge across the mouth of the Water of Leith was completed in July 2011 at a cost of $NZ 24.7 million.

The highway is notoriously dangerous for cyclists and pedestrians. This is due in no small part to its winding (and in places narrow) nature; the heavy container traffic between the port, city, and heavy industrial works close to Logan Park; and the lack of footpaths for much of its length. In order to partially alleviate these dangers, a separate walkway and cycleway was built parallel to the highway in the early 2000s between the mouth of the Leith and Maia, bypassing Ravensbourne and its associated industrial sites (the Ravensdown fertiliser factory and Logan Point quarry). The West Harbour cycleway was extended to Port Chalmers in 2023, becoming part of the harbour-encircling Te Aka Ōtākou, linking Port Chalmers and Portobello on Otago Peninsula, later the same year.

== See also ==
- List of New Zealand state highways
