= Sawyers Bay =

- Suburb
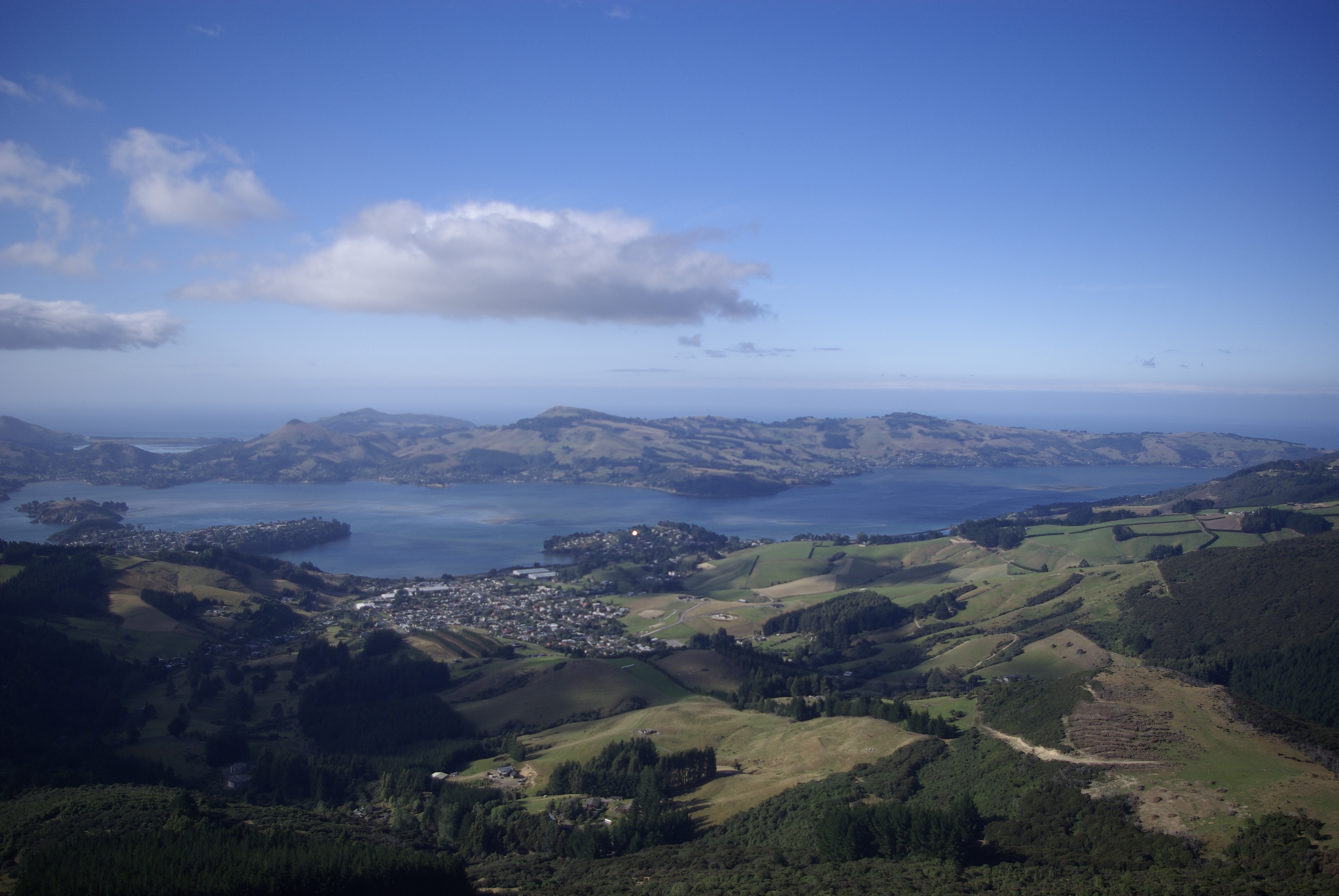
- Sawyers Bay seen from Mt Cutten
- Interactive map of Sawyers Bay
- Coordinates: 45.8187°S 170.6016°E
- Country: New Zealand
- City: Dunedin
- Local authority: Dunedin City Council

Area
  - Land: 229 ha (570 acres)

Population (2018 Census)
  - Total: 1,095
  - Density: 478/km^{2} (1,240/sq mi)

		Port Chalmers
	Sawyers Bay
St Leonards	Roseneath	(Otago Harbour)

Sawyers Bay is a suburb of the New Zealand city of Dunedin. It is located 1.5 kilometres (0.93 mi) to the southwest of Port Chalmers in a wide valley on the shore of Mussel Bay, 13 kilometres (8.1 mi) to the northeast of Dunedin city centre.

The suburb, on the western shore of Otago Harbour, lies between the two rocky headlands of Port Chalmers in the east and Roseneath in the west. The South Island Main Trunk rail line and State Highway 88 run along the shore of the bay.

The name of the suburb is indicative of the occupation of many of its early settlers; the Sawyers Bay area provided much of the timber used in the early construction industry around both Dunedin and Port Chalmers area. Little remains of Sawyers Bay's early industries; it is now largely a residential suburb.

Sawyers Bay's residential area is situated around one long street which runs inland from the bay itself. This street is called Station Road at its coastal end, and Hall Road further inland. At the coastal end, it connects with State Highway 88, the highway which runs along the west coast of Otago Harbour from Port Chalmers to Dunedin via Saint Leonards and Ravensbourne. Inland from here, roads branch off the main road – the most important of these is Stevenson Avenue, which connects with a back road to Port Chalmers (Borlases Road) in the east, and with Upper Junction Road in the west. Upper Junction Road, the winding old road to Port Chalmers from the Dunedin suburb of North East Valley, rises to join with the old Mount Cargill road, which was itself the former main road north out of Dunedin, linking the city's main urban area at Normanby with Waitati.

Other notable features of Sawyers Bay include the Port Chalmers Golf Course, located in the north of Sawyers Bay. A bush walk, Grahams Bush, links the end of Hall Road with the Mount Cargill road. Sawyers Bay's most prolific family is the McLachlan clan, whose tenement dates back to pre-European settlement. Its current population base is now comprised by residents reliant on the marine environment and a large contingent of Firefighters

== Demographics ==
Historical population for Sawyers Bay
Year	Pop.	±% p.a.
2006	1,032	—
2013	996	−0.51%
2018	1,095	+1.91%

Sawyers Bay, which covers 2.29 km^{2} (0.88 sq mi), is part of the Roseneath-Sawyers Bay statistical area.

Sawyers Bay had a population of 1,095 at the 2018 New Zealand census, an increase of 99 people (9.9%) since the 2013 census, and an increase of 63 people (6.1%) since the 2006 census. There were 444 households, comprising 549 males and 543 females, giving a sex ratio of 1.01 males per female, with 237 people (21.6%) aged under 15 years, 147 (13.4%) aged 15 to 29, 522 (47.7%) aged 30 to 64, and 189 (17.3%) aged 65 or older.

Ethnicities were 94.2% European/Pākehā, 12.1% Māori, 2.2% Pasifika, 1.9% Asian, and 2.2% other ethnicities. People may identify with more than one ethnicity.

Although some people chose not to answer the census's question about religious affiliation, 60.0% had no religion, 30.4% were Christian, 0.8% had Māori religious beliefs, 0.3% were Buddhist and 1.9% had other religions.

Of those at least 15 years old, 186 (21.7%) people had a bachelor's or higher degree, and 192 (22.4%) people had no formal qualifications. 144 people (16.8%) earned over $70,000 compared to 17.2% nationally. The employment status of those at least 15 was that 438 (51.0%) people were employed full-time, 120 (14.0%) were part-time, and 27 (3.1%) were unemployed.

=== Roseneath-Sawyers Bay statistical area ===
Roseneath-Sawyers Bay covers 4.79 km^{2} (1.85 sq mi) and had an estimated population of 1,510 as of June 2025, with a population density of 315 people per km^{2}.

Historical population for Roseneath-Sawyers Bay
Year	Pop.	±% p.a.
2006	1,395	—
2013	1,317	−0.82%
2018	1,449	+1.93%

Roseneath-Sawyers Bay had a population of 1,449 at the 2018 New Zealand census, an increase of 132 people (10.0%) since the 2013 census, and an increase of 54 people (3.9%) since the 2006 census. There were 594 households, comprising 714 males and 735 females, giving a sex ratio of 0.97 males per female. The median age was 44.2 years (compared with 37.4 years nationally), with 294 people (20.3%) aged under 15 years, 195 (13.5%) aged 15 to 29, 708 (48.9%) aged 30 to 64, and 249 (17.2%) aged 65 or older.

Ethnicities were 94.0% European/Pākehā, 11.0% Māori, 2.1% Pasifika, 2.3% Asian, and 2.3% other ethnicities. People may identify with more than one ethnicity.

The percentage of people born overseas was 14.7, compared with 27.1% nationally.

Although some people chose not to answer the census's question about religious affiliation, 60.2% had no religion, 30.2% were Christian, 0.6% had Māori religious beliefs, 0.4% were Buddhist and 2.1% had other religions.

Of those at least 15 years old, 294 (25.5%) people had a bachelor's or higher degree, and 228 (19.7%) people had no formal qualifications. The median income was $33,400, compared with $31,800 nationally. 210 people (18.2%) earned over $70,000 compared to 17.2% nationally. The employment status of those at least 15 was that 588 (50.9%) people were employed full-time, 174 (15.1%) were part-time, and 42 (3.6%) were unemployed.

== Education ==
Sawyers Bay School is a state contributing primary school serving years 1 to 6 with a roll of 103 students as of March 2026. The school was established in 1861.
