= St Leonards, Dunedin =

Suburb of the New Zealand city of Dunedin

St Leonards
- Suburb
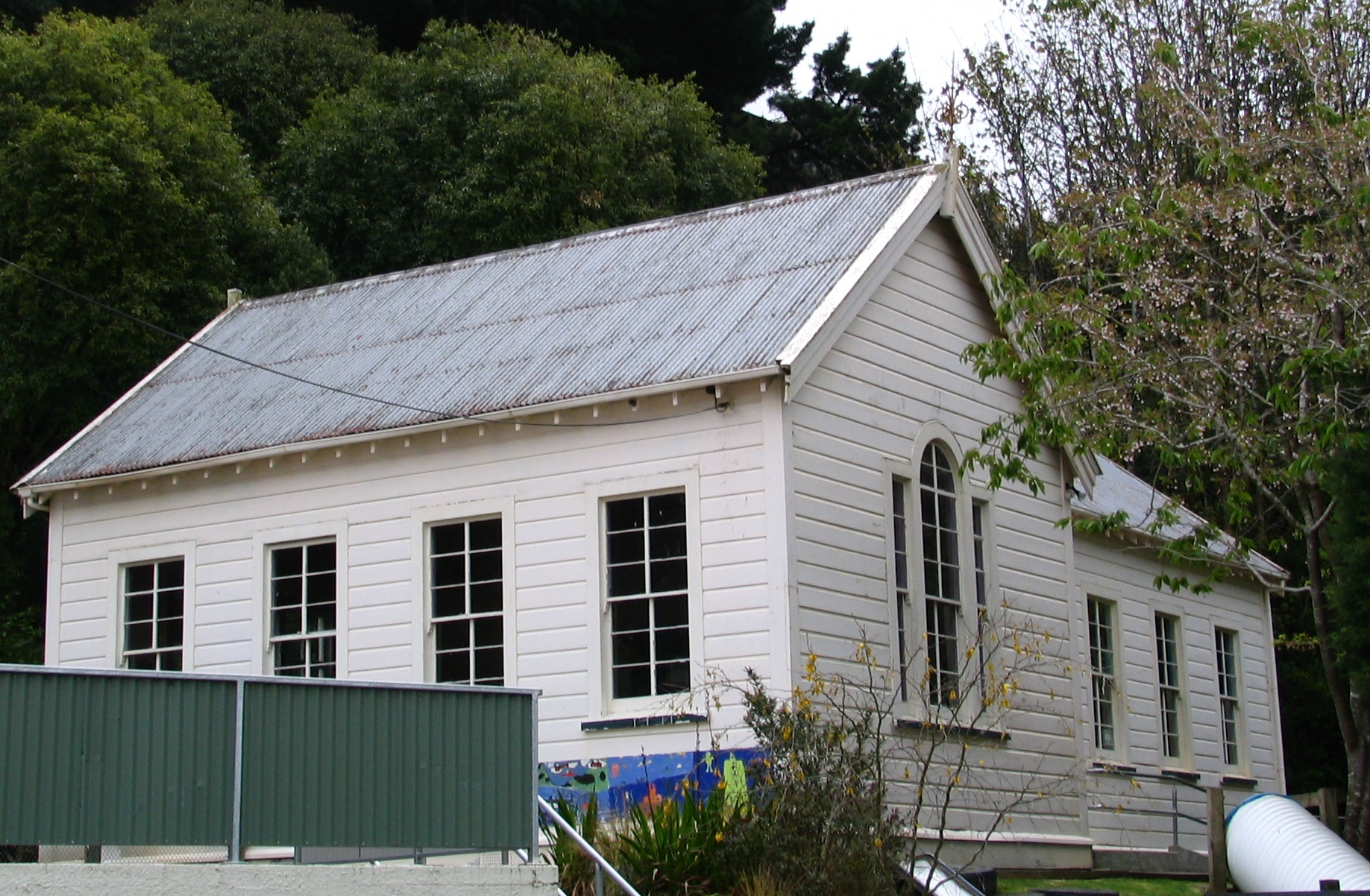
- The original school building at St Leonards School
- Interactive map of St Leonards
- Coordinates: 45.8484°S 170.5786°E
- Country: New Zealand
- City: Dunedin
- Local authority: Dunedin City Council
- Community board: West Harbour Community

Area
  - Land: 303 ha (750 acres)

Population (2018 Census)
  - Total: 669
  - Density: 221/km^{2} (572/sq mi)

Normanby		Roseneath
Opoho	St Leonards
Ravensbourne		(Otago Harbour)

St Leonards is a suburb of the New Zealand city of Dunedin. It is located close to the northern shore of the Otago Harbour and on the hilly slopes above the harbour. St Leonards is 8.5 kilometres (5.3 mi) northeast of Dunedin's city centre, between the small settlement of Burkes and Sawyers Bay. St Leonards was named by early settler David Carey for the birthplace of his wife, the English town of St Leonards-on-Sea, on the Sussex coast.

Rail and road links between central Dunedin and Port Chalmers run alongside St Leonards on the narrow strip of land between the hill slopes and harbour. The suburb is separate from the contiguous urban area of Dunedin.

The suburb is residential, and contains a significant number of smaller homes. The area is a popular residence for students from the University of Otago, and is also popular with alternative lifestylers. The suburb consists mainly of two roughly parallel roads, the Dunedin-Port Chalmers highway (State Highway 88), which runs close to the harbour, and St Leonards Drive, the former main route to Port Chalmers, which winds around the lower slopes of the hills on which St Leonards sits. The Port Chalmers Branch railway line runs parallel with the highway next to the harbour's edge. In 2012, the Dunedin Harbour Cycleway was extended to reach St Leonards.

The suburbs of St Leonards, Maia, Burkes, and Ravensbourne, are often collectively referred to as West Harbour. Under this name, the area was a separate borough for many years from 1877 until amalgamation with the city of Dunedin in 1963.

== Demographics ==
St Leonards and Burkes, which cover 3.03 km^{2} (1.17 sq mi), are part of the Ravensbourne-St Leonards statistical area.

Historical population
Year	Pop.	±% p.a.
2006	636	—
2013	672	+0.79%
2018	669	−0.09%

They had a population of 669 at the 2018 New Zealand census, a decrease of 3 people (−0.4%) since the 2013 census, and an increase of 33 people (5.2%) since the 2006 census. There were 261 households, comprising 315 males and 354 females, giving a sex ratio of 0.89 males per female, with 102 people (15.2%) aged under 15 years, 96 (14.3%) aged 15 to 29, 363 (54.3%) aged 30 to 64, and 117 (17.5%) aged 65 or older.

Ethnicities were 93.7% European/Pākehā, 6.7% Māori, 1.3% Pasifika, 3.1% Asian, and 2.7% other ethnicities. People may identify with more than one ethnicity.

Although some people chose not to answer the census's question about religious affiliation, 60.5% had no religion, 28.7% were Christian, 0.4% had Māori religious beliefs, 0.9% were Hindu, 0.4% were Muslim, 0.4% were Buddhist and 3.6% had other religions.

Of those at least 15 years old, 225 (39.7%) people had a bachelor's or higher degree, and 57 (10.1%) people had no formal qualifications. 138 people (24.3%) earned over $70,000 compared to 17.2% nationally. The employment status of those at least 15 was that 300 (52.9%) people were employed full-time, 102 (18.0%) were part-time, and 12 (2.1%) were unemployed.

== Education ==
St Leonards School is a state contributing primary school serving years 1 to 6 with a roll of 7 students as of March 2026. The school was founded in 1868 as Upper Harbour West School, and was expanded and renamed in 1874.
