= Roseneath, Otago =

Roseneath
- Suburb
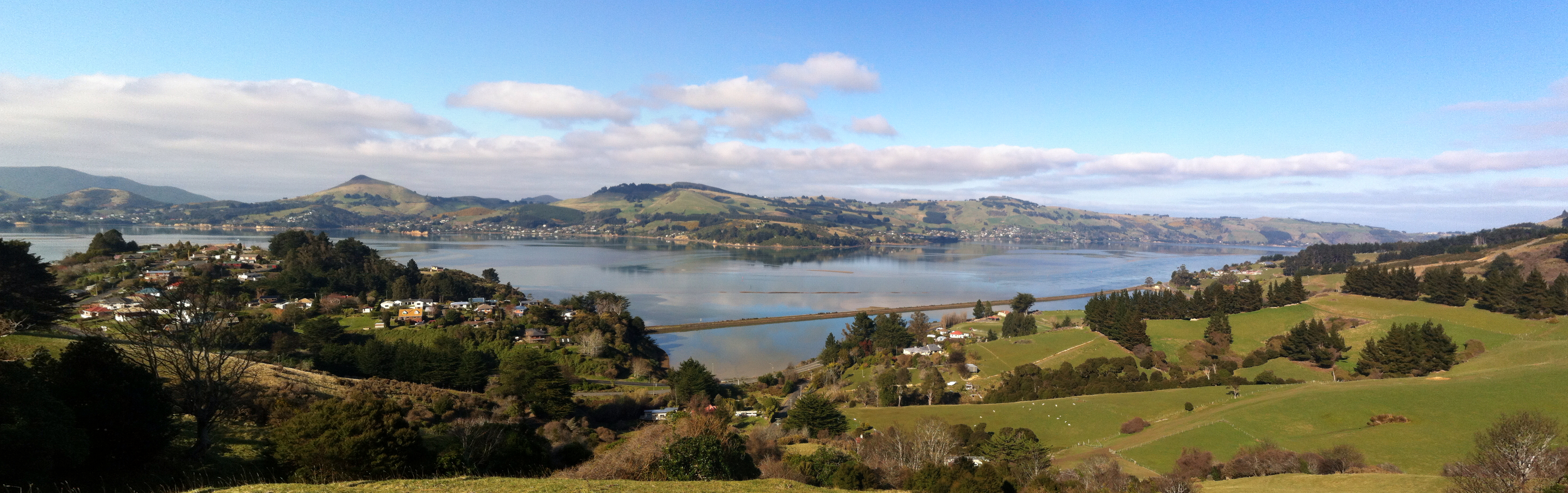
- Otago Harbour and Roseneath
- Interactive map of Roseneath
- Coordinates: 45.8275°S 170.5998°E
- Country: New Zealand
- City: Dunedin
- Local authority: Dunedin City Council

Area
  - Land: 38 ha (94 acres)

Population (2018 Census)
  - Total: 228
  - Density: 600/km^{2} (1,600/sq mi)

	Sawyers Bay	Port Chalmers
	Roseneath
St Leonards	Roseneath	(Otago Harbour)

Roseneath is a small suburb of the New Zealand city of Dunedin, located on the northwestern shore of Otago Harbour, 12 kilometres (7.5 mi) to the northeast of Dunedin city centre. It is situated between Saint Leonards and Port Chalmers on a rocky promontory of the same name which juts 0.6 kilometres (0.37 mi) into the harbour between Sawyers Bay and Blanket Bay. The suburb and promontory are likely to have been named from the similar location of Rosneath in Scotland.

State Highway 88, linking Port Chalmers and central Dunedin traverses a low saddle immediately to the west of the suburb, and the South Island Main Trunk rail line passes through a tunnel beneath the promontory. The suburb's few streets include District Road, Shandon Street, and Clyde Street. Panoramic views of the harbour can be gained from close to the short peninsula's southernmost point, Kilgour Point.

Prior to local body reorganisation in New Zealand in the late 1980s, Roseneath was a suburb of Port Chalmers.

== Demographics ==
Historical population
Year	Pop.	±% p.a.
2006	249	—
2013	219	−1.82%
2018	228	+0.81%

Roseneath, which covers 0.38 km^{2} (0.15 sq mi), is part of the Roseneath-Sawyers Bay statistical area.

It had a population of 228 at the 2018 New Zealand census, an increase of 9 people (4.1%) since the 2013 census, and a decrease of 21 people (−8.4%) since the 2006 census. There were 105 households, comprising 108 males and 123 females, giving a sex ratio of 0.88 males per female, with 33 people (14.5%) aged under 15 years, 24 (10.5%) aged 15 to 29, 123 (53.9%) aged 30 to 64, and 51 (22.4%) aged 65 or older.

Ethnicities were 96.1% European/Pākehā, 9.2% Māori, 1.3% Pasifika, 2.6% Asian, and 1.3% other ethnicities. People may identify with more than one ethnicity.

Although some people chose not to answer the census's question about religious affiliation, 55.3% had no religion, 32.9% were Christian and 3.9% had other religions.

Of those at least 15 years old, 69 (35.4%) people had a bachelor's or higher degree, and 30 (15.4%) people had no formal qualifications. 42 people (21.5%) earned over $70,000 compared to 17.2% nationally. The employment status of those at least 15 was that 99 (50.8%) people were employed full-time, 30 (15.4%) were part-time, and 6 (3.1%) were unemployed.
