= ROA =

ROA may refer to:

== Sports and arts ==
- Racehorse Owners Association, a British horse racing organisation
- Refugee Olympics Athletes, a selection of refugees who will be competing under the Olympic flag at the 2016 Summer Olympics
- Revolt On Antares, a science-fiction themed microgame designed by Tom Moldvay and produced by TSR in 1981
- Rules of Acquisition, in the fictional Star Trek universe, a set of sacred guidelines intended to ensure the profitability of businesses owned by members of the ultra-capitalist alien race known as the Ferengi
- X-Men Legends II: Rise of Apocalypse, a video/computer game
- Rivals of Aether, a 2017 fighting game

== People ==
- ROA (artist) (born c. 1975), pseudonym of a Belgian graffiti artist known for his large realistic depictions of animals in black-and-white
- ROA Crewe-Milnes (1858–1945), a British statesman and writer

== Government ==
- ROA Time, the official time of Spain established by The Royal Institute and Observatory of the Spanish Navy in San Fernando, Cádiz
- Rehabilitation of Offenders Act 1974, United Kingdom act that enables some criminal convictions to be ignored after a rehabilitation period

== Military ==
- Reserve Officers Association, a professional association of officers, former officers, and spouses of all the uniformed services of the United States
- Russian Liberation Army (РОА in Cyrillic letters, or ROA), a group of predominantly Russian forces subordinated to the Nazi German high command during World War II

== Finance ==
- Return on assets, a financial metric
- Real Options Analysis, option valuation techniques for capital budgeting decisions

== Science and medicine ==
- Raman optical activity, a vibrational spectroscopic technique
- Right occipito-anterior, a cephalic vertex presentation in childbirth where the fetus is in a longitudinal lie and the head enters the pelvis first
- Roaccutane, a medication used mostly for cystic acne and in chemotherapy
- Route of administration, in pharmacology and toxicology, the path by which a drug, fluid, poison, or other substance is taken into the body
- Route Origin Authorization (Internet routing), a cryptographically signed entry in IP registry databases that specifies the authorized source AS of a certain network
- Rutgers Optimality Archive, an archive of work in Optimality Theory managed by Eric Bakovic

== Schools ==
- Retford Oaks Academy, a secondary school with academy status in the market town of Retford, Nottinghamshire, England
- River Oaks Academy, a private kindergarten through 12th grade school in the Westchase district of Houston, Texas

== Other uses ==
- "Róa", a 2025 single by Væb representing Iceland in the Eurovision Song Contest
- Peugeot ROA, an Iranian made car
- Roanoke-Blacksburg Regional Airport in Roanoke, Virginia, USA, IATA code
- Rear Occupant Alert, a warning when a car door is closed from the outside with people still inside
- Resource-oriented architecture, a style of software architecture and programming paradigm for designing and developing software
- Reformed Armenian Orthography, a spelling reform of the Armenian alphabet in 1922–1924
- Ruger Old Army, a black-powder percussion revolver introduced in 1972 by the Sturm, Ruger company
- Republic of Artsakh, unrecognized state in Southern Caucasus
- Route Origination Authorization, proof of authorization to announce a route for an IP prefix

== See also ==
- Roa (disambiguation)
- Röa (disambiguation)
