= Roa =

Roa or Røa may refer to:

== Places ==
- Roa de Duero, a municipality in Burgos Province, Spain
- Røa, a former borough of the city of Oslo, Norway
- Roa, a small settlement near Blackball, New Zealand
- Roa, Ivory Coast, a village in Comoé District, Ivory Coast
- Roa, Norway, administrative centre of Lunner municipality
- Roanoke–Blacksburg Regional Airport (ROA), an airport in Virginia, USA

== People ==
- Carlos Roa, an Argentine football goalkeeper
- Laura Roa, Spanish bioengineer
- *Mario Mosquera Roa (1929–2010), a Chilean trade union leader and politician
- ROA (artist) or Roa, pseudonym of a Belgian graffiti artist

== Fictional characters ==
- Loa (Fullmetal Alchemist) or Roa, a character in the manga series Fullmetal Alchemist
- Michael Roa Valdamjong, a character in the visual novel Tsukihime

== Other uses ==
- "Róa", a 2025 single by Væb representing Iceland in the Eurovision Song Contest
- Racehorse Owners Association, a UK-based membership association
- Rivals of Aether, a 2017 platform fighting game
- Roa (film), a 2013 Colombian film
- Roa (fish), a genus of butterflyfish
- Roa Branch or Roa Incline, New Zealand branch railway section of Blackball Branch
- ST Roa, a tugboat
- Romance languages (ISO 639-2: roa)

== See also ==
- ROA (disambiguation)
- Röa (disambiguation)
