= The Downs (ship anchorage) =

Roadstead near the English Channel

Coordinates: 51°11′08″N 1°29′23″E

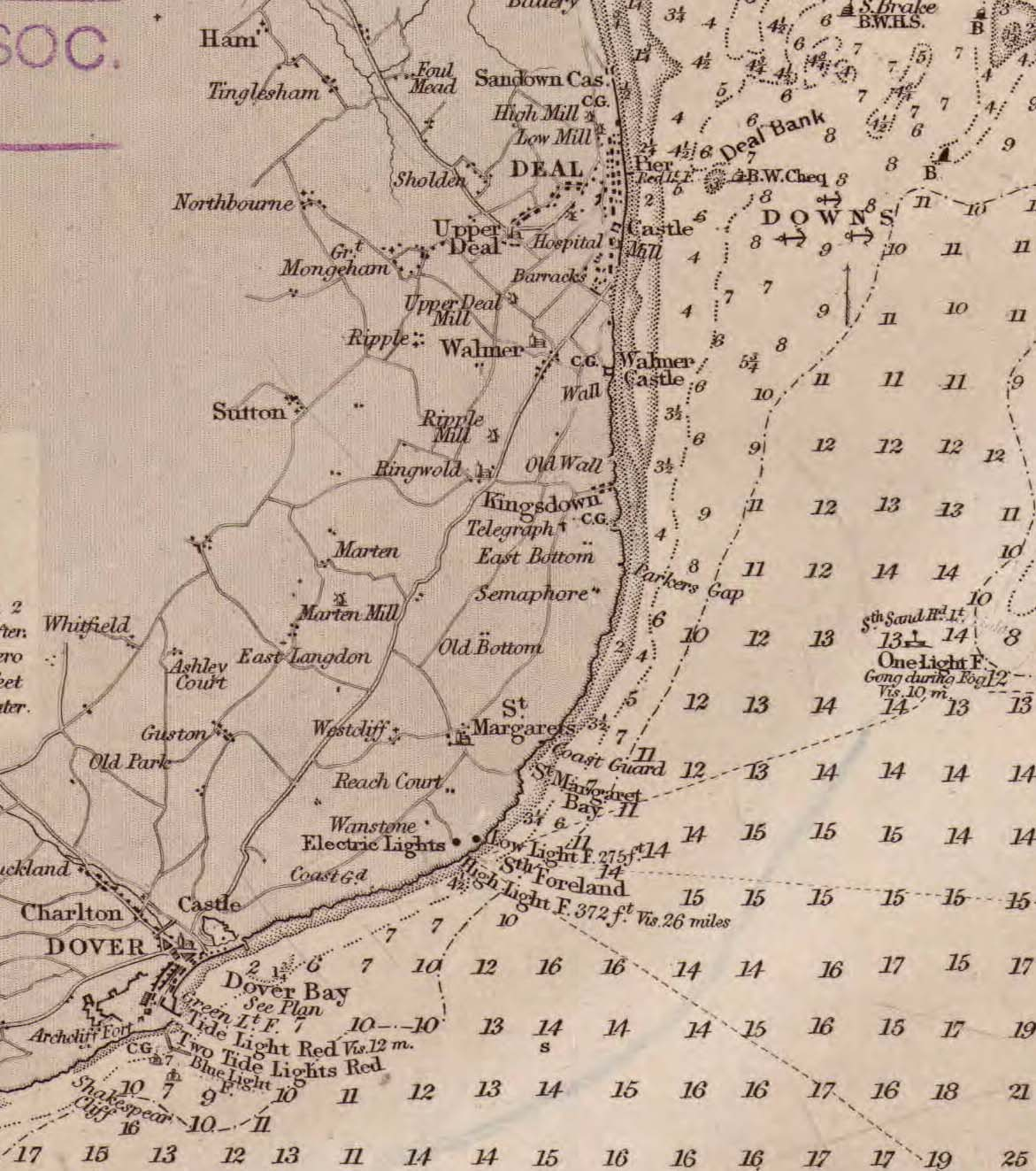
1848 chart showing the position of the Downs off the coast of Kent. Depths are in fathoms.

The Downs is a roadstead (an area of sheltered, favourable sea) in the southern North Sea near the English Channel, off the east Kent coast in southern England, between the North and the South Foreland, near the town of Deal. From the Elizabethan era onward the presence of the Downs helped to make Deal one of the premier ports in England, and in the 19th century it was equipped with its own telegraph and timeball tower to enable ships to set their marine chronometers.

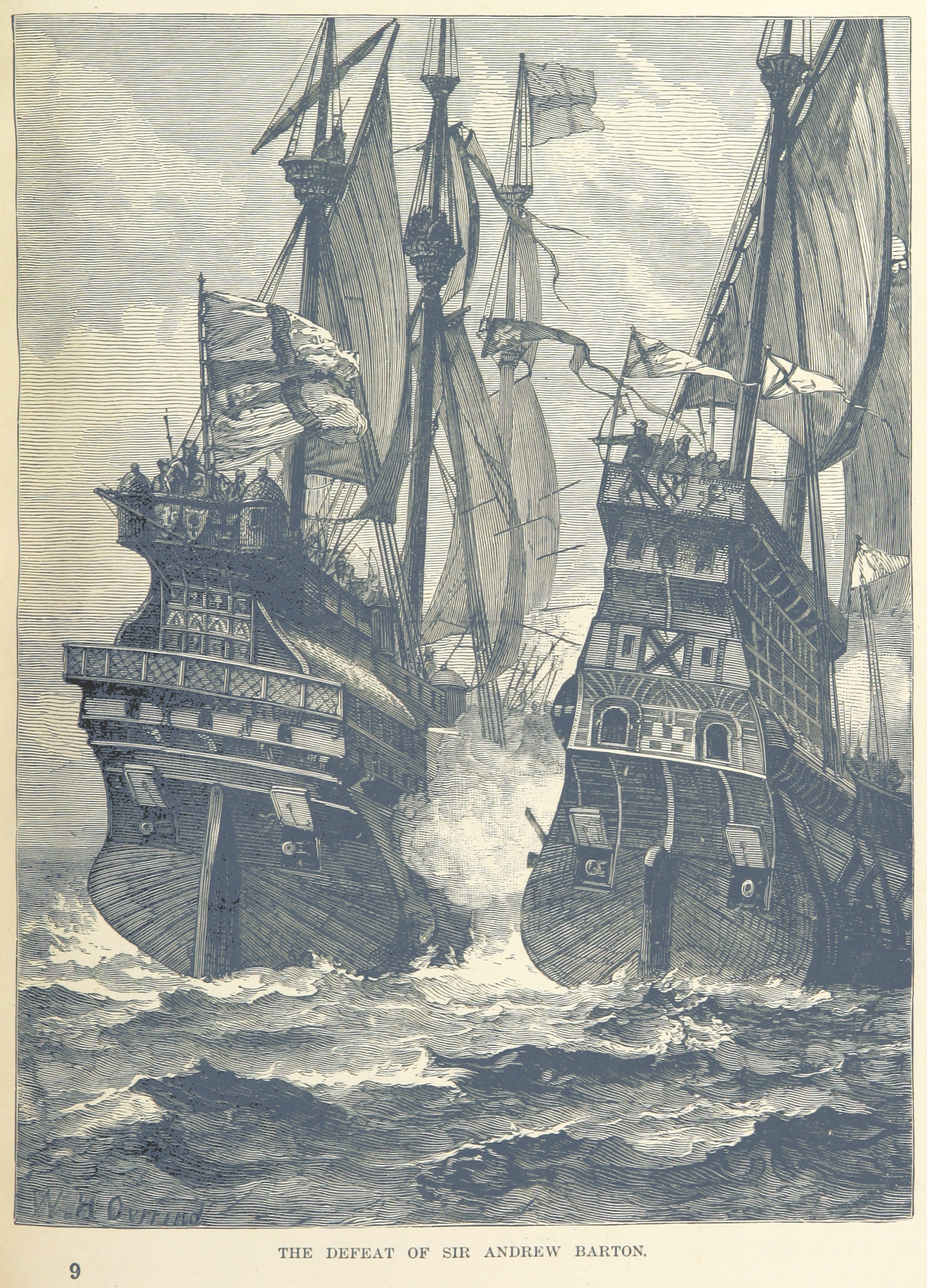
The Defeat of Privateer Andrew Barton

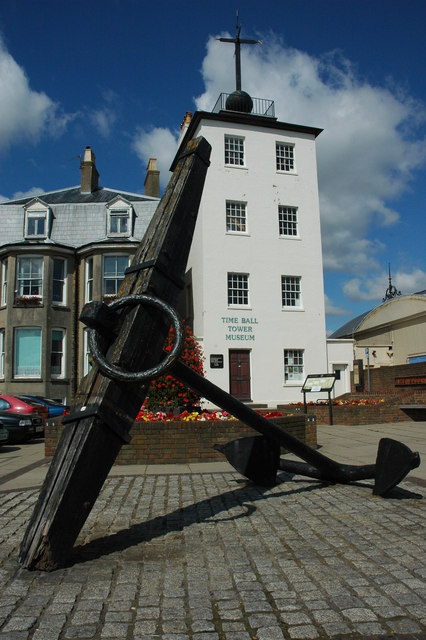
Timeball Tower, Deal, Kent

The anchorage has depths down to 12 fathoms (72 ft; 22 m). Even during southerly gales some shelter was afforded, though under this condition wrecks were not infrequent. Storms from any direction could also drive ships onto the shore or onto the sands, which—in spite of providing the sheltered water—were constantly shifting, and not always adequately marked. The Downs served in the Age of Sail as a permanent base for warships patrolling the North Sea and a gathering point for refitted or new ships coming out of Chatham Dockyard, such as HMS Bellerophon, and formed a safe anchorage during heavy weather, protected on the east by the Goodwin Sands and on the north and west by the coast. The Downs lie between the Strait of Dover and the Thames Estuary, so both merchant ships awaiting an easterly wind to take them into the English Channel and those going to London gathered there, often for quite long periods. According to the Deal Maritime Museum and other sources, there are records of as many as 800 sailing ships at anchor at one time.

In August 1511, Andrew Barton, a privateer, was killed in battle on board his ship. The Battle of the Downs took place here in 1639, when the Dutch navy destroyed a Spanish fleet which had sought refuge in neutral English waters. During the First World War, German destroyers made frequent raids against ships anchored in the Downs. Royal Navy vessels of the Dover Patrol were often tasked with guarding the area at night to discourage the enemy or counter-attack.

The English Channel remains the busiest shipping lane in the world; cross-Channel ferries and other ships still seek shelter in The Downs.

== Popular culture ==
"Black-eyed Susan" or "All in the Downs" is a song by John Gay (1685–1732). The roadstead is also mentioned in the naval song "Spanish Ladies".
