= Robert Tranquillo =

Robert T. Tranquillo is an American bioengineer, focusing in cardiovascular tissue engineering, currently the Distinguished McKnight University Professor at the University of Minnesota, formerly the Shell Land Grant Chair, and is an Elected Fellow of the American Institute for Medical and Biological Engineering, International Academy of Medical and Biological Engineering and the Biomedical Engineering Society.

== Early life and career ==
Bob Tranquillo had obtained his Bachelor's degree from Pennsylvania State University in chemical engineering in 1979 and next year got his Master's from Stanford University in the same field. Four years later he completed his Ph.D. in chemical engineering at the University of Pennsylvania in 1986 and immediately became NATO Postdoctoral Fellow at the Center for Mathematical Biology at Oxford University. In 1987 he worked at the Department of Chemical Engineering and Materials Science at the University of Minnesota and in 2000 was the head of the Department of Biomedical Engineering at the same place.
