= Kenneth Lutchen =

American academic and engineer

Kenneth Lutchen is a biomedical engineer, researcher, professor, and university leader. He was named university provost and chief academic officer ad interim of Boston University in July 2023. In July 24 he became the Senior Advisor to the President for Strategy and Innovation and in September of 2025 was names the Vice President of Research.

== Education ==
Lutchen earned a Bachelor of Science in engineering science at the University of Virginia. He earned a Master of Science and PhD at Case Western Reserve University, both in biomedical engineering.

== Academic career ==
Lutchen has spent most of his professional academic career at Boston University. In 1984, he joined the faculty as an assistant professor of biomedical engineering and was promoted to associate professor in 1991. He created the Biomedical Engineering Student Design Program and started the Annual Senior Project Conference.

In 1998, Lutchen became a full professor at BU and was appointed as chair of the Biomedical Engineering Department. As Chair he helped the department win a $14 Million Whitaker Foundation Leadership Award, one of only three given among all BME departments nationwide. Lutchen became dean of the College of Engineering in 2006 and served in that position until 2023. Lutchen initiated and oversaw the creation of BU's Engineering Product Innovation Center (EPIC), Bioengineering Technology and Entrepreneurship Center (BTEC), and the Robotics and Autonomous Systems Teaching and Innovation Center (RASTIC). He reorganized the college in 2008, including the creation of the Division of Materials Science and Engineering and the Division of Systems Engineering. In 2010, the Kenneth R. Lutchen Distinguished Fellowship Program was created to support ten undergraduate summer research fellows per year in biomedical engineering and honor Lutchen's contributions to the college. Under his leadership, the National Science Foundation awarded the college a grant to create its Engineering Research Center. Lutchen was also the first BU dean to create the position of Associate Dean of Outreach and Diversity.

On May 31, 2023, it was announced that Lutchen would assume the role of BU's university provost and chief academic officer ad interim on July 1, 2023.

On July 1, 2024, it was announced that Lutchen would assume the role of BU's Senior Advisor to the President for Strategy and Innovation. He has since designed BU's new Artificial Intelligence Development Accelerator (AIDA) for Excellence in Academics and Administration and is serving as its inaugural executive director.

On September 1, 2025 it was announced that Lutchen would assume the role of Vice President of Research.

In addition to his tenure at BU, he served as technical staff and consultant at the MIT Lincoln Laboratory from 1983 to 1995, and as a visiting professor of bioengineering at the University of Siena in Siena, Italy, in 1991.

== Research ==
Lutchen is active in the field of respiratory mechanics. His research focuses on lung disease, including cause mechanisms, diagnosis methods, and more efficacious treatments. He developed an image-based modeling system that provides a real-time look at lungs during asthma attacks.

Lutchen has served on and led several biomedical boards and committees, including:

- Wyss Institute for Biologically Inspired Engineering at Harvard University Board of Directors, 2010 to present
- International Academy of Medical and Biological Engineering, elected fellow, 2019
- National Science Foundation Directorate for Engineering Advisory Committee, 2016–2019
- American Institute for Medical and Biological Engineering President, 2010–2013
- Biomedical Engineering Society Board of Directors, 1992–1995

== Selected publications ==
In addition to journal articles and book chapters, Lutchen has also written several op-eds on engineering education, technology transfer, and biomedical issues in publications such as Harvard Business Review, Fortune magazine, and Business Insider. These publications include:

- "Multiscale stiffness of human emphysematous precision cut lung slices", Science Advances, 2023
- "A Few Bad Airways Can Wreak Havoc: Recognizing Asthma as a Local Disorder", American Journal of Respiratory and Critical Care Medicine; 2023
- "The Silent "Zone" Screams Again: Identifying COPD Patients Most at Risk", CHEST Journal, 2021
- "Years of anti-science sentiment has left America in a terrifying predicament", Business Insider; 2020
- "Why Companies and Universities Should Forge Long-Term Collaborations", Harvard Business Review; 2018
- "This Is the Best Major For Every Wannabe CEO", Fortune; 2016
- "Linking Ventilation Heterogeneity Quantified via Hyperpolarized 3He MRI to Dynamic Lung Mechanics and Airway Hyperresponsiveness", PLOS One, 2015
- "A Mechanical Design Principle for Tissue Structure and Function in the Airway Tree", PLOS One, 2013
- "Engineering Efficient Technology Transfer", Science Advances, 2011
- "Lung tissue viscoelasticity: from extracellular matrix complexity to constitutive equations", Handbook of Biomedical Engineering, 2005
- "Understanding Pulmonary Mechanics Using the Forced Oscillation Technique: Emphasis on Breathing Frequencies", Bioengineering Approaches to Pulmonary Physiology, 1996

== Selected awards and honors ==
- International Academy of Medical and Biological Engineering (IAMBE) Fellow, 2019
- American Institute for Medical and Biological Engineering (AIMBE) Pierre Galleti Award, 2014
- Biomedical Engineering Society Fellow, 2005

== Personal ==
Kenneth Lutchen lives in Newton, Massachusetts, with his family.
