= Shepherd Gate Clock =

Clock outside Greenwich Observatory, London

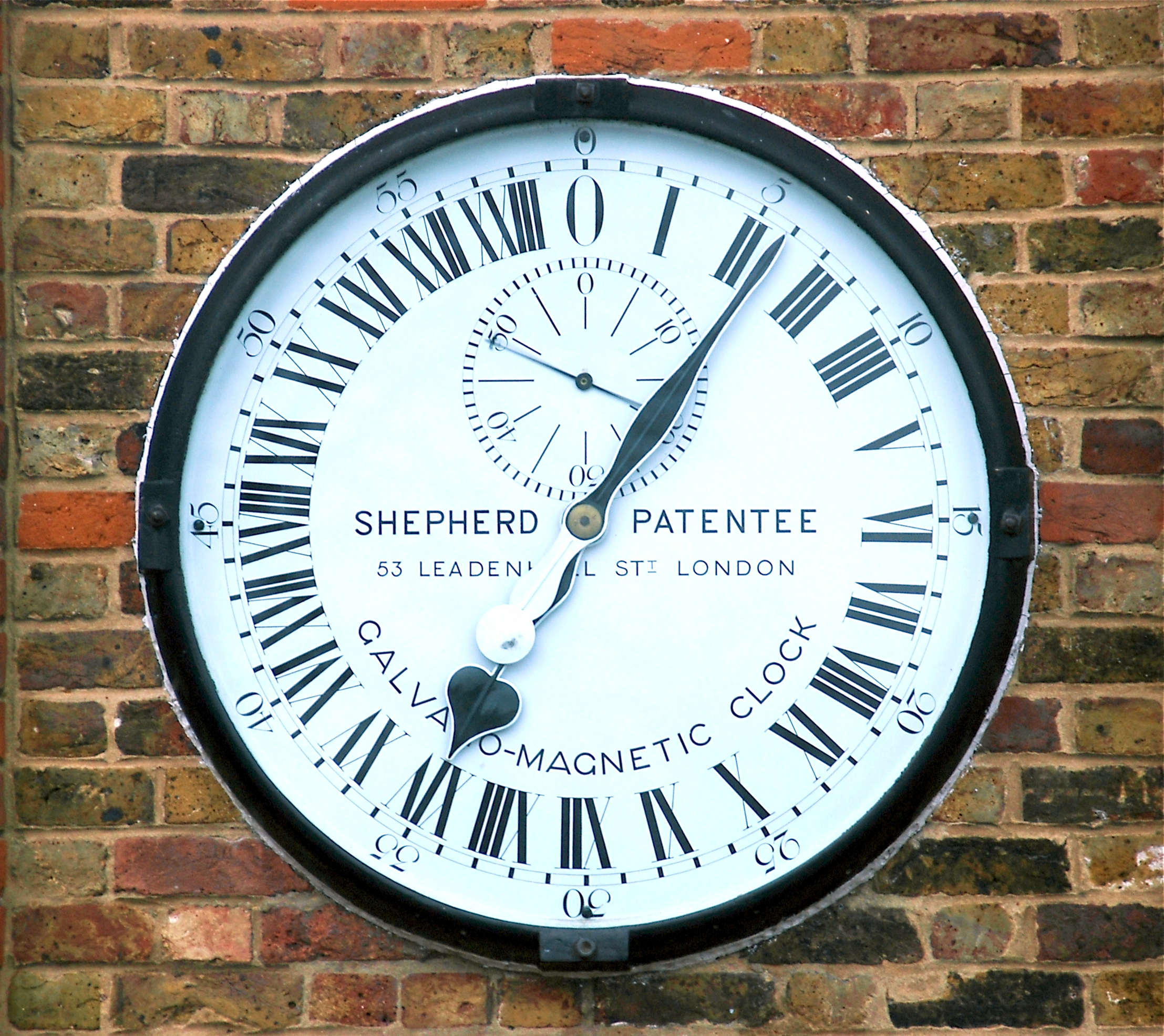
The Shepherd Gate Clock at the entrance to the Royal Observatory, Greenwich. It shows Greenwich Mean Time all year round.

The Shepherd Gate Clock (51°28′41″N 0°00′05″W) is mounted on the wall outside the gate of the Royal Observatory, Greenwich building in Greenwich, Greater London. The clock, an early example of an electrically connected clock system, was a sympathetic clock mechanism controlled by electric pulses transmitted by a motor clock inside the main building. The network of 'sympathetic clocks' was constructed and installed by Charles Shepherd in 1852. The clock by the gate was probably the first to display Greenwich Mean Time to the public, and is unusual in using the 24-hour analog dial. Also, it originally showed astronomical time which started at noon, not midnight.

The gate clock distributed the time publicly; another time signal of the observatory was the time ball, since 1833. The time ball only signalled 1 pm (13:00), but could be seen from afar. Eventually the idea of distributing time signals via wires led to more and more electrical distribution of time signals by this method. Time signals, besides their general importance in the affairs of business, were especially important for running ships and trains punctually. The situation was exacerbated by a lack of accuracy in many clocks compared to modern time-keepers.

== Summary ==
The system was first developed for the 1851 Great Exhibition (a.k.a. The Crystal Palace Exhibition in London), which led to Airy installing the Shepherd sympathetic system at the observatory. The time comes from the Shepherd Motor Clock inside the observatory. In 1866 the time signals from the Shepherd Motor Clock were sent across the Atlantic via transatlantic cable to America.

== Origins ==
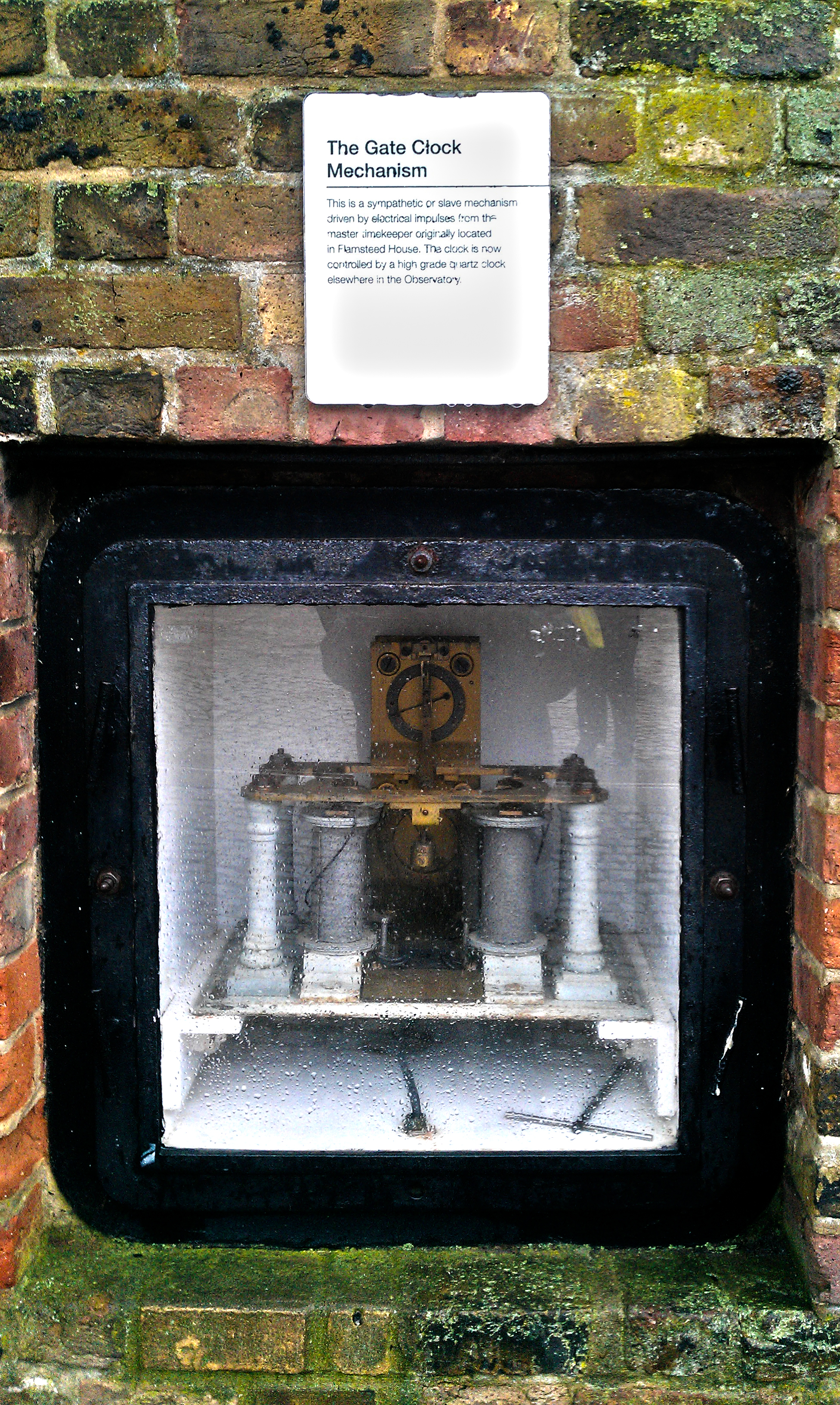
Mechanism of the clock – on display but not in use

The original idea for the clock network came from the Astronomer Royal, George Airy. With the arrival of the railway network, a single time standard was needed to replace the various incompatible local times then in use across the country. Airy proposed that this standard time would be provided by the Royal Observatory. His idea was to use what he called "galvanism" or electric signalling to transmit time pulses from Greenwich to other clocks throughout the country, and perhaps to Europe and the colonies too. The new undersea cable recently installed between Dover and Calais in 1851 raised the possibility of sending time signals between England and France – this would allow longitude differences to be measured very accurately, for the first time.

== Charles Shepherd ==
In 1849 Charles Shepherd Junior (1830–1905), an engineer and son of a clockmaker, patented a system for controlling a network of sympathetic clocks using electricity (or galvanism, as it was called). Shepherd installed the public clocks for the Great Exhibition which opened in May 1851. In October 1851, Airy wrote to Charles Shepherd asking for proposals and estimates, including a request for the following clocks:

One automatic clock. One clock with large dial to be seen by the Public, near the Observatory entrance, and three smaller clocks, all to be moved sympathetically with the automatic clock.

Airy also wanted the existing Greenwich time ball to be electrically operated, so that its descent at 13:00 was synchronised with the motor clock inside the observatory.

By August 1852 Shepherd had built and installed the network of clocks and cables in the observatory. Costs were considerably higher than the original estimates. Shepherd had estimated £40 for the motor clock and time ball apparatus, and £9 for each sympathetic clock. The total costs included £70 for the motor clock, and £75 for the wall clock by the gate.

Shepherd was later appointed to oversee the construction of a telegraph network for the Indian Government in 1853.

== Transmitting Greenwich time ==
The motor clock, at first called the Normal Clock or Motor Clock, but later known as the Mean Solar Standard Clock, sent pulses every second to sympathetic clocks in the Chronometer Room, the Dwelling House (Flamsteed House), and at the gate (the Gate Clock). A pulse was sent to the time ball at 13:00. The signals were also transmitted along cables from Greenwich to London Bridge. From London Bridge a time signal was distributed at less frequent intervals by telegraph wires to clocks and receivers in London, Edinburgh, Glasgow, Dublin, Belfast and many other cities. From 1866 time signals were also sent to US Harvard University via the new transatlantic submarine cable.

Airy's report to the Observatory's Board of Visitors in 1853 explained the function of the Shepherd motor clock:

This clock keeps in motion a sympathetic galvanic clock in the Chronometer room, which, therefore, is sensibly correct; and thus the chronometers are compared with a clock which requires no numerical correction.

The same Normal Clock maintains in sympathetic movement the large clock at the entrance-gate, two other clocks in the Observatory, and a clock at the London Bridge Terminus of the South-Eastern Railway.

It sends galvanic signals every day along all the principal railways diverging from London. It drops the Greenwich Ball and the Ball on the Offices of the Eastern Telegraph Company in the Strand.

All these various effects are produced without sensible error of time; and I cannot but feel a satisfaction in thinking that the Royal Observatory is thus quietly contributing to the punctuality of business through a large portion of this busy country.

== Since installation ==
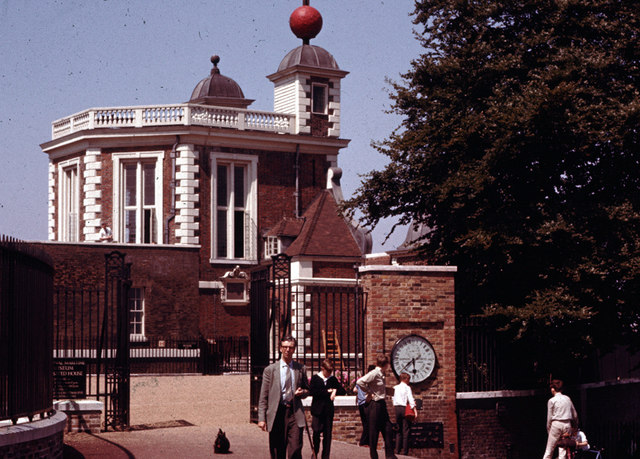
Flamsteed House (with its red time ball) overlooks the Gate clock, 1960

The Gate Clock originally indicated astronomical time, in which the counting of the 24 hours of each day starts at noon. The clock was changed in the 20th century to indicate Greenwich Mean Time, in which the counting of the 24 hours of each day starts at midnight. The Gate Clock continues to show Greenwich Mean Time and is not adjusted for summer time. The clock is now controlled by a quartz mechanism inside the main building. The motor clocks are still on display but are not functional.

The Timeball Museum in Deal contains another clock once connected to the Greenwich motor clock.

On 15 October 1940, during the World War II Blitz, the dial was damaged by a bomb, but the mechanism survived. The dial was replaced by an exact replica.

== See also ==
- Royal Observatory, Greenwich
- Ruth Belville, the 'Greenwich Time lady'
