= Laura Roa =

Spanish biomedical engineer

Laura María Roa Romero is a Spanish biomedical engineer, and a University Professor in the Biomedical Engineering Group at the University of Seville, which she founded in 1986. She has a doctorate from the University of Seville, earned in 1980.

== Recognition ==
Roa was named a Fellow of the IEEE in 2003, "for contributions to new resuscitation therapies for burn patients that are based on mathematical modeling, simulation, and control techniques". She is also a fellow of the Real Academia de Medicina y Cirugía de Sevilla, the International Academy of Medical and Biological Engineering, and the American Institute for Medical and Biological Engineering.

She was president of the Sociedad Española de Ingeniería Biomédica (Spanish Biomedical Engineering Society) from 2004 to 2012.
