= Juan Muñoz y Peralta =

Spanish physician (1655–1746)

Juan Muñoz y Peralta (1695–1746) was a Spanish physician from Seville who in 1693 founded the Real Academia de Medicina y Cirugía de Sevilla (The Royal Academy of Medicine and Surgery of Seville) and attended King Philip V.

In 1724, he and Diego Mateo Zapata were both denounced to the Spanish Inquisition as judaisers.
