= Diego Mateo Zapata =

Spanish physician and philosopher (1664–1745)

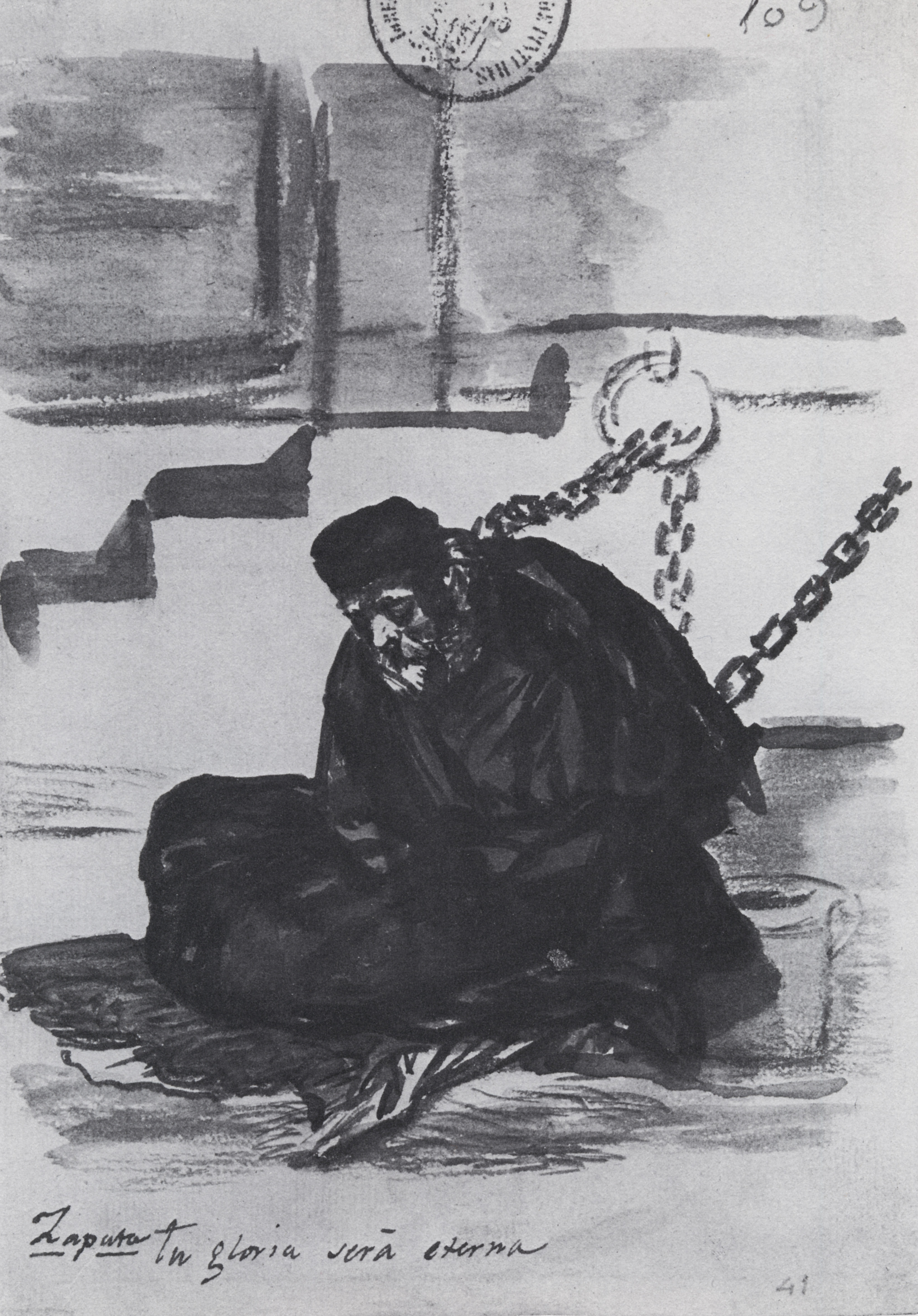
Diego Mateo López Zapata in his cell before his trial by the Inquisition Court of Cuenca by Francisco de Goya

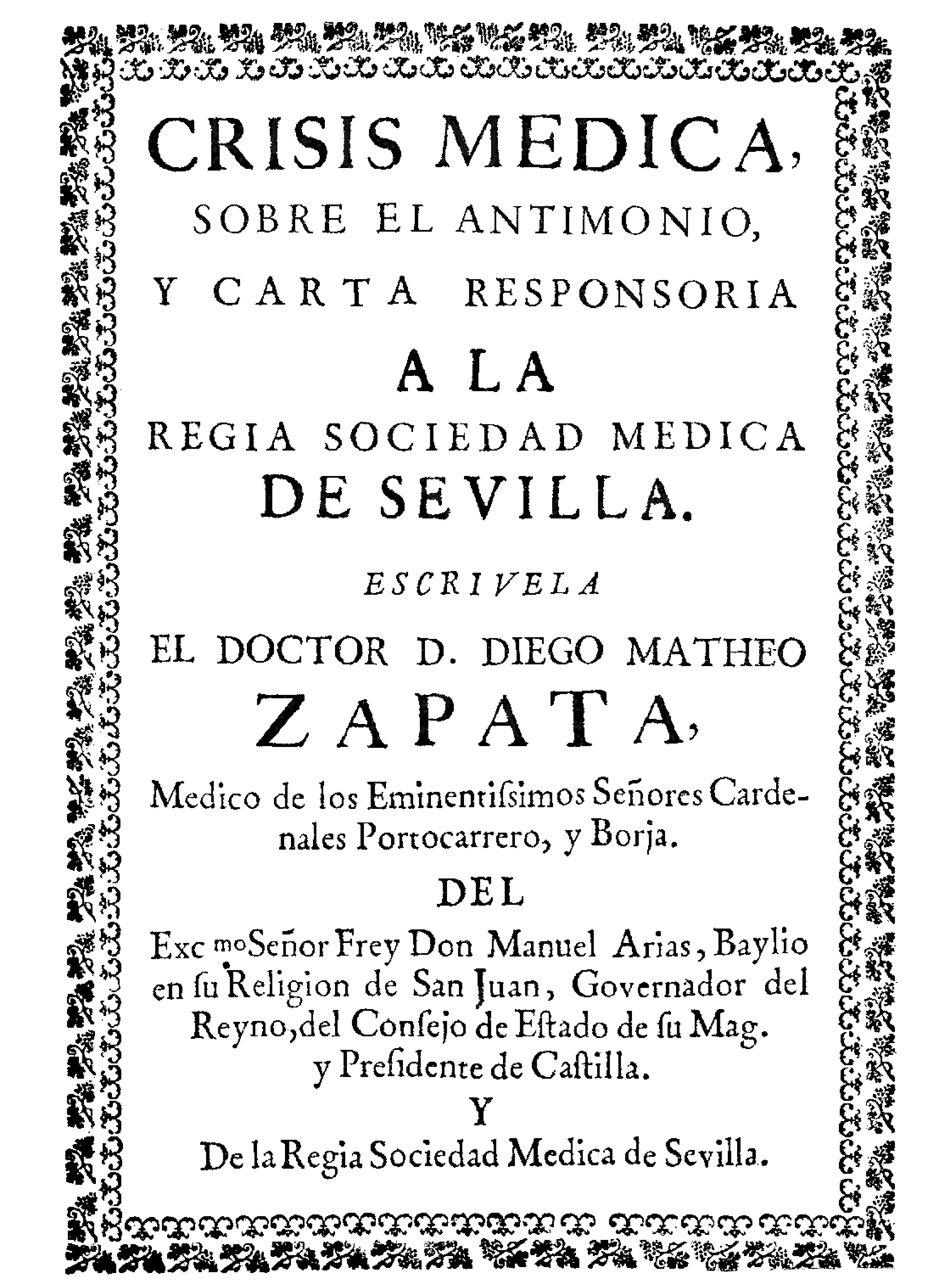
Crisis médica sobre el antimonio (1701)

Diego Mateo López Zapata (August 1664 – July 1745) was a Spanish physician and philosopher who was denounced by the Spanish Inquisition and subsequently tortured for following and promoting Judaism in the 17th and 18th centuries. Zapata treated a number of influential figures in the court of King Philip V.

== Early life and education ==
Diego Mateo Zapata was born in August 1664 in Murcia, Spain, the son of Francisco Zapata and Clara de Mercado Núñez de Acosta. Diego's parents were conversos descended from Sephardic Jews who moved from Toledo to Murcia in the 16th century.

On 24 June 1678, Diego's parents and other relatives were arrested by the Murcia tribunal of the Spanish Inquisition for allegedly being Judaizers. Before sentencing, Diego's mother Clara was imprisoned for three years. During his visits to the prison, Diego's mother secretly taught her son about Judaism and its rituals. Clara was eventually sentenced to life in prison and had her assets partially confiscated, while Diego's father Francisco was acquitted of the charges. Because of the effect of his mother's sentence, Diego henceforth became a Crypto-Jew, openly presenting as a Christian while privately practicing Judaism.

At the age of 17, Diego was sent to study medicine at the University of Valencia. He later transferred to the University of Alcalá, where he studied under Francisco Enríquez de Villacorta, a fellow Crypto-Jew. He completed his medical studies in 1685, at the age of 21.

== Career ==
Zapata arrived in Madrid in 1687. In 1691, Zapata published his first book, True Apology in Defense of Rational Philosophical Medicine, defending Galenic medicine against the charges of José Gazola. The book raised Zapata's profile and opened career opportunities, including at the General Hospital of Madrid. However, Zapata's associations with Crypto-Jews in Madrid led to his imprisonment first by the Inquisitional Court of Madrid, and then in Cuenca in 1692. He was released, but his case remained open, thus making Zapata ineligible for professorships.

=== Denouncement to Inquisition ===
After his release, Zapata's high profile and fame as a doctor led to his association with the royal court of Philip V by the early 1700s. Zapata also attended Luis Manuel Fernández de Portocarrero, archbishop of Toledo, and the Duke of Medinaceli, among other nobles and court figures. He also co-founded the Real Academia de Medicina y Cirugía de Sevilla with Juan Muñoz y Peralta.

However, Zapata was arrested again on 1 March 1721 on charges of being a Judaizer and a rabbi. His case was personally overseen by Juan de Camargo y Angulo, the Grand Inquisitor of Spain. Zapata was in pretrial detention for four years, during which he supposedly confessed to his charges under threat of torture. Zapata was forced to wear the sambenito. Zapata was acquitted on 14 January 1725, but still ordered to 10 years of exile from Madrid, Murcia, and Cuenca, the confiscation of half of his assets (including his 600-volume library), 200 lashes, and a year's imprisonment. After only one year of exile, however, Zapata returned to Madrid under the protection of the Duke of Medinaceli and King Philip V and resumed his medical activities.

== Death ==
Zapata died in Madrid in July 1745. Before his death, Zapata was visited by the Duke of Alba. His work Ocaso de las formas aristotélicas ("Twilight of Aristotelian Forms") was published posthumously and banned by the Inquisition.

== Selected works ==
- Verdadera apología de la Medicina racional filosófica, y debida respuesta a los entusiasmos médicos que publicó en esta corte D. José Gazola Veronense, archisoplón de las estrellas (Madrid, 1691).
- Crisis médica sobre el antimonio (1701).
- "Censura" a Alejandro de Avendaño, Diálogos filosóficos en defensa del atomismo (1716).
- "Prólogo" a la traducción de Félix Palacios de Nicolás Lemery, Curso de química (1721).
- Disertación médico-teológica, que consagra a la serenísima señora princesa del Brasil (Madrid, 1733).
- Ocaso de las formas aristotélicas (1745).
