= Flat Iron Building (Prescot) =

Historic building in Prescot, Merseyside, England

Coordinates: 53°25′47.19″N 2°48′7.22″W

- 72 Ecclestone Street
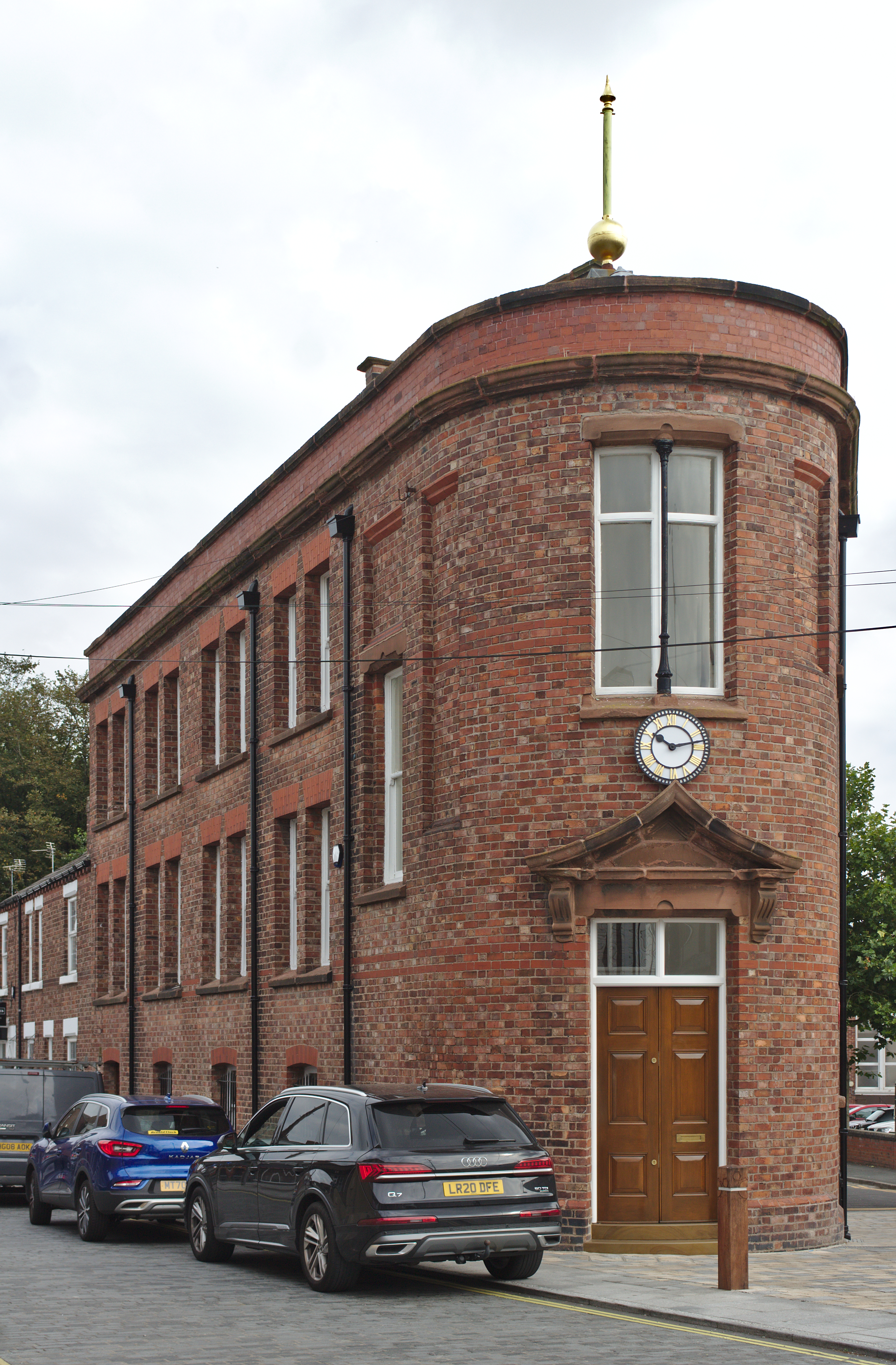

General information
- Location: Ecclestone Street, Prescot, Merseyside, England
- Year(s) built: 1890

Technical details
- Floor count: 3

Design and construction
- Developer: Thomas Dennett

Flat Iron Building, also known as 72 Ecclestone Street, is a historic building in Prescot, Merseyside. It was built in 1890 to service Prescot's extensive watchmaking industry.

== History ==
Up until the late 19th century, Prescot was the English centre of watchmaking. The Flat Iron building was built in 1890 and served as a specialised workshop and warehouse for the Lancashire Watch Company, who made watches in a nearby factory. When the Lancashire Watch Company closed in 1911, the building was later bought by the Prescot Clock and Mechanism Co. who reportedly produced 30,000 to 40,000 watches between 1911 and 1914. After the closure of the company in 1969, the building was used by several other companies, including a clothing retailer and eyewear retailer before becoming vacant in 2017.

== Restoration ==
Following the last tenant vacating the building, restoration work commenced in 2018. The work saw repairs to the outside of the building as well as the fitting of new staircases, doors and sash windows and the restoration of some of the original features such as a fireplaces. The restoration work was partially funded by the Liverpool City Region Town Centre fund, Prescot Township Heritage Initiative Fund and Knowsley Borough Council. By summer 2023, the restoration work was completed with the fitting of a historical clock, made in Prescot in the early 1800s, and with the addition of a time ball time-signalling device.

== See also ==
- Architecture of Liverpool

== Sources ==
- The Lancashire Watch Company: Prescot, Lancashire, England 1889-1910., Roberts, Kenneth D., Alan Smith, Henry G. Abbett, Ken Roberts Publishing, New Hampshire 1973 ISBN 0-913602-08-6
