= Deal Timeball =

Historic time signal in Deal, England

Coordinates: 51.2219°N 1.4042°E

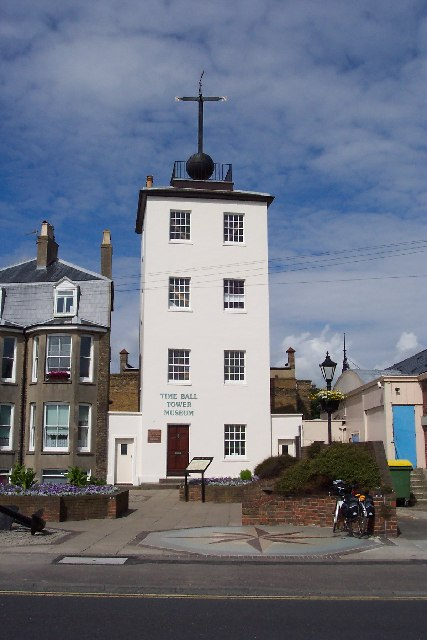
Deal Timeball Tower.

The Deal Timeball is a Victorian maritime Greenwich Mean Time signal located on the roof of a waterfront four-storey tower in the coastal town of Deal, in Kent, England. It was established in 1855 by the Astronomer Royal George Biddell Airy in collaboration with Charles V. Walker, superintendent of telegraphs for the South Eastern Railway Company. It was built by the Lambeth firm of engineers Maudslay and Field. The time ball, which, like the Greenwich time ball, fell at 1 pm precisely, and was triggered by an electric signal directly from the Royal Observatory.

== History ==
The Timeball Tower stands on the site of an earlier Shutter Telegraph. This early form of optical telegraphy was one of a chain of stations between the Admiralty in London and the Naval Yard at Deal. The telegraph line opened in 1796 and closed in 1814. Its purpose was to allow rapid communication between London and Deal, near the Downs as an important Naval anchorage during the Napoleonic Wars. In 1805 news of the naval victory at Trafalgar and the death of Nelson was brought to Deal by the schooner HMS Pickle (after calling at Falmouth), and transmitted by the telegraph to the Admiralty in London.

From 1821 to 1831, the Tower carried a semaphore mast, another form of visual telegraphy which was used signal to ships at anchor in the Downs or passing in the English Channel. It was employed by the Coast Blockade for the Suppression of Smuggling to pass information along the coast. The Blockade was under the auspices of the Navy, and was staffed by their personnel.

== Museum ==
The Deal Timeball Tower Museum features exhibits about the history of the tower and its use for navigation aid, fight against smuggling, signaling, and the mechanics of the time ball.

== See also ==
- Shepherd Gate Clock
- Time signal
