= Williamstown Timeball Tower =

Lighthouse in Victoria, Australia

Williamstown Lighthouse
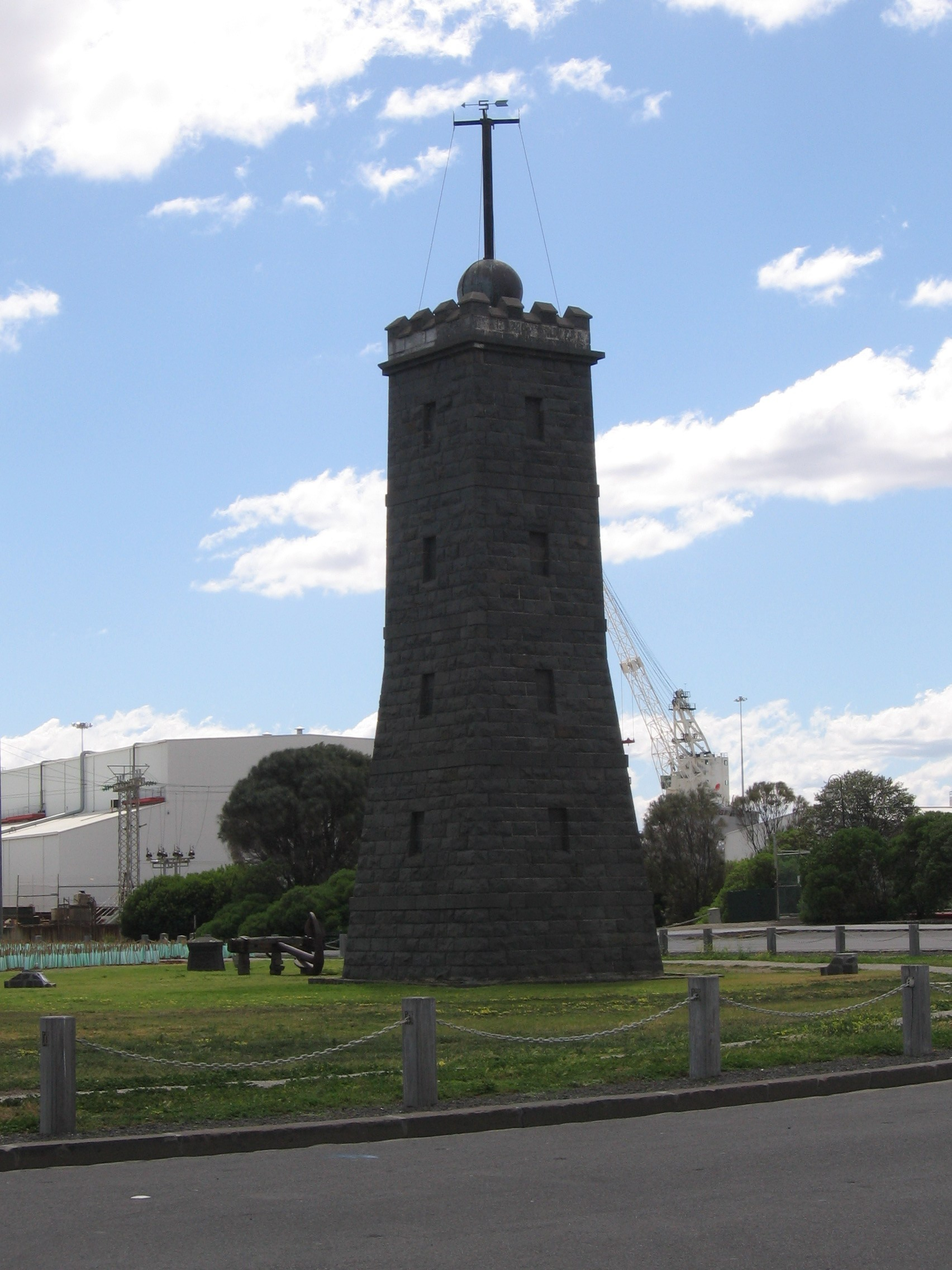
- Timeball tower.
- Location: Williamstown; Victoria; Australia
- Coordinates: 37°52′00.6″S 144°54′45.7″E

Tower
- Constructed: 1840 (first); 1849 (second); 1934 (third)
- Construction: wooden tower (first) bluestone tower (second and third)
- Automated: 1934
- Height: 17 metres (56 ft)
- Shape: quadrangular tower with timeball mast
- Markings: unpainted tower
- Power source: mains electricity
- Operator: Parks Victoria
- Heritage: listed on the Victorian Heritage Register

Light
- Deactivated: 1849 (first); 1859 (second); 1987 (third)
- Focal height: 22 metres (72 ft)
- Range: 15 nautical miles (28 km; 17 mi)
- Characteristic: Fl GR 7.5s. (as lighthouse 1934-1987)

Victorian Heritage Register
- Official name: Time Ball Tower
- Type: State heritage
- Designated: 20 August 1982
- Reference no.: H1649
- Place ID: 1222
- Category: Transport – Water
- Architect: Henry Ginn

The Williamstown Lighthouse more commonly known as the Williamstown Timeball Tower, is situated at Point Gellibrand, in the Melbourne suburb of Williamstown.

== History ==
It was erected in 1852, with an unusual square form, and replaced earlier navigational aids established from the time of the first settlement in 1835. It is 17 metres high, and situated at an elevation of 22 metres. Built of local bluestone (basalt), it is the second-oldest lighthouse in Victoria after the one at Cape Otway.

The first lighthouse on the site was built in 1839–40. That timber structure was replaced with a square bluestone lighthouse tower, designed by Henry Ginn. The bluestone section has battered lower storeys, featuring rusticated masonry with smooth string courses, and had a castellated parapet with mast and spherical, copper-plate timeball above. The masonry was quarried and worked by prisoner labour. Four lamps were shining in May 1849, and a larger lamp was installed in August 1849.

The timeball apparatus operated until August 1926. A large copper ball encircled the central mast and rested at the bottom in a catcher cup of iron when not in use. Each afternoon, the ball was raised to the top of the mast and dropped at precisely one o'clock, to allow the captains of ships moored offshore to check the accuracy of their marine chronometers. The tower provided an additional time signal at eight o'clock each night by means of eclipsing the lantern of the lighthouse.

After the timeball ceased to operate, the apparatus was dismantled. In 1932, the tower was adapted for better use as a lighthouse. It was increased to a height of 98 feet (30 m) by the addition of a circular brick tower 30 feet (9 m) tall. The lighthouse operated in that fashion until 1987. In 1989, the circular brick tower was removed by the Williamstown Historical Society so that the square tower could be restored and the timeball apparatus reinstated.

== See also ==
- List of lighthouses in Australia
