= Real Instituto y Observatorio de la Armada =

Astronomical observatory of the Spanish Navy

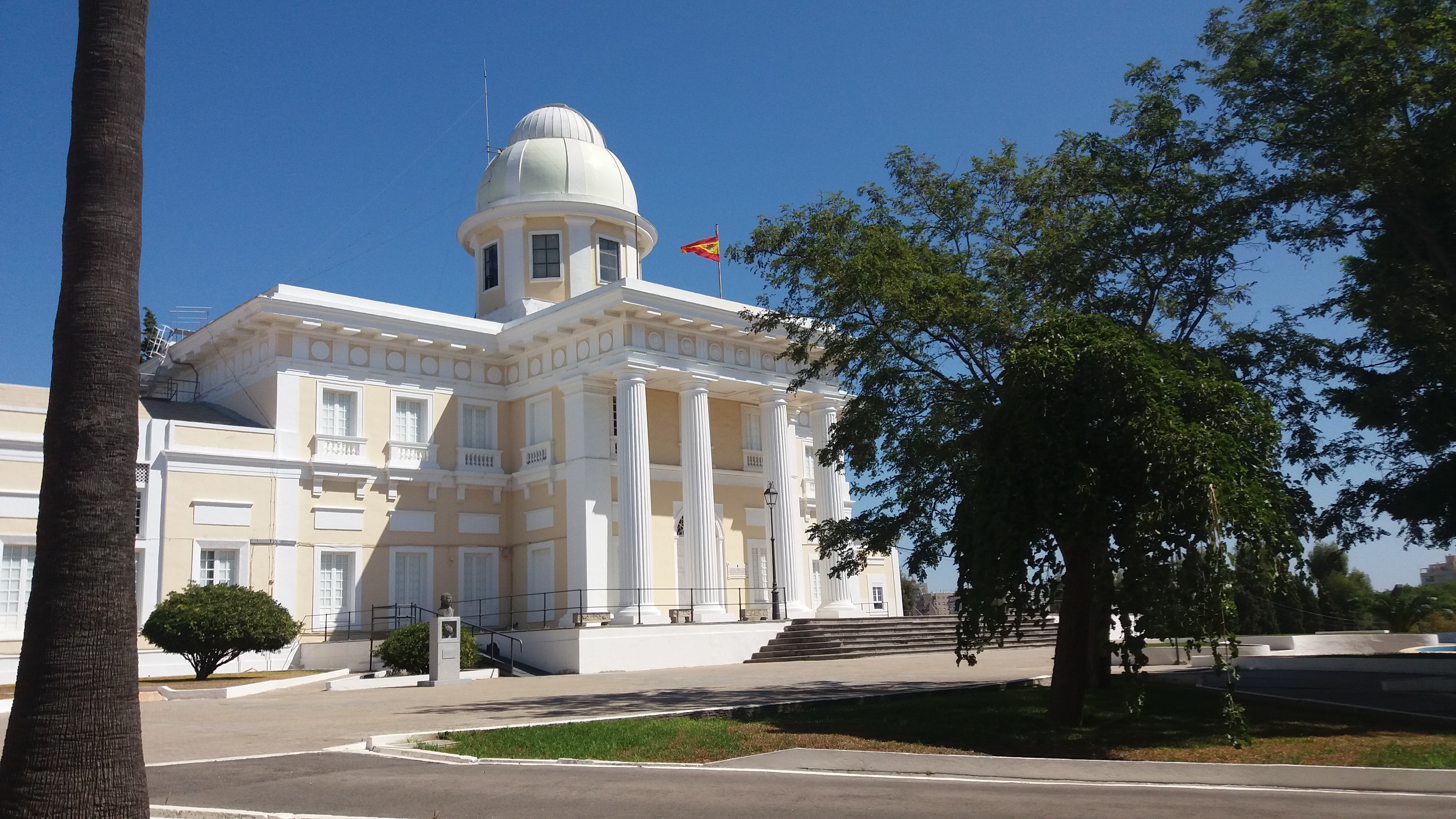
- Alternative names: Instituto y Observatorio de Marina de San Fernando
- Observatory code: 983
- Location: Province of Cádiz, Andalusia, Spain
- Coordinates: 36°27′54″N 6°12′21″W
- Website: www.armada.mde.es/roa
- Related media on Commons

The Real Instituto y Observatorio de la Armada (Royal Institute and Observatory of the Spanish Navy) is the scientific institute and astronomical observatory of the Spanish Navy (Armada), located in San Fernando in the Province of Cádiz, Andalusia, Spain.

== History ==
It was founded in 1753 and is the oldest in Spain. Astronomy was of particular importance to the navy in the context of navigation. In 1790 the Royal Observatory in Madrid was built to take over the purely astronomical work of the facility at San Fernando.

== Current activities ==
In recent years the observatory has been adversely affected by light pollution. However, it uses laser technology to monitor pieces of space junk.

The observatory operated a time ball so that ships at sea could synchronize their clocks. After better timekeeping at sea made it obsolete, it was disabled, but it was reactivated in the late 20th century every day at 13:00.

== See also ==
- ROA Time
