= Time ball =

Time-signalling device

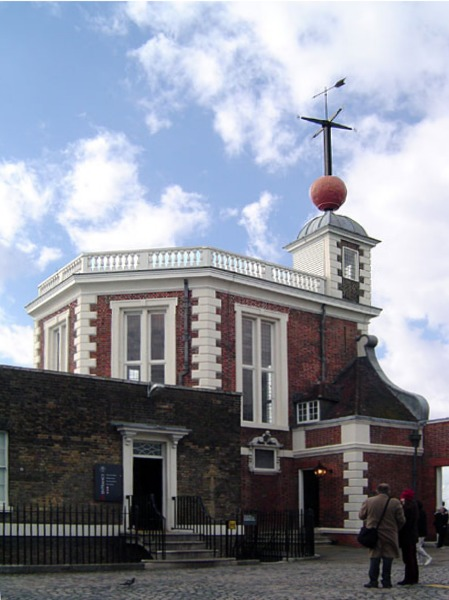
A time ball, installed in 1833, atop the Octagon Room at the Royal Observatory, Greenwich, London

A time ball is a large, wooden or metal ball that moves up and down a pole, and which is dropped at a predetermined time of day. Because precise timekeeping is essential to the determination of longitude at sea, time balls were principally erected to allow navigators aboard nearby ships to synchronize their marine chronometers with a reference time standard controlling the ball.

Time balls have been rendered obsolete by electronic time signals, but some are kept in operation as tourist attractions.

== History ==
Time ball stations set their clocks according to transit observations of the positions of the sun and stars. Originally they either had to be stationed at the observatory, or had to keep a very accurate clock at the station which was set manually to observatory time. Following the introduction of the electric telegraph around 1850, time balls could be located at a distance from their source of mean time and operated remotely.

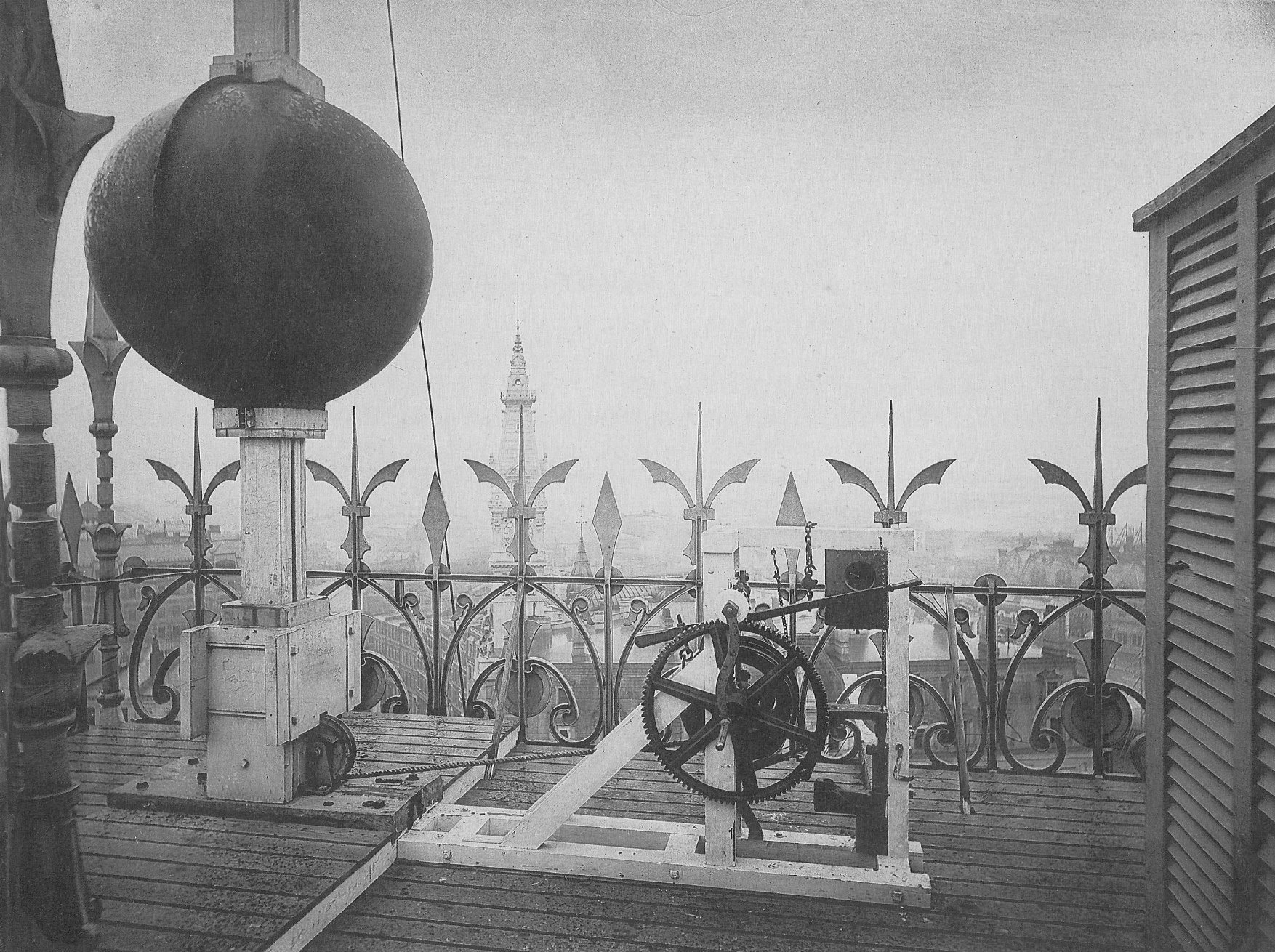
The Boston Time Ball (1881)

The first modern time ball was erected at Portsmouth, England, in 1829 by its inventor Robert Wauchope, a captain in the Royal Navy. Others followed in the major ports of the United Kingdom (including Liverpool) and around the maritime world. One was installed in 1833 at the Greenwich Observatory in London by the Astronomer Royal, John Pond, originally to enable tall ships in the Thames to set their marine chronometers, and the time ball has dropped at 1 p.m. every day since then. Wauchope submitted his scheme to American and French ambassadors when they visited England. The United States Naval Observatory was established in Washington, D.C., and the first American time ball went into service in 1845.

Time balls were usually dropped at 1 p.m. (although in the United States they were dropped at noon). They were raised half way about 5 minutes earlier to alert the ships, then with 2–3 minutes to go they were raised the whole way. The time was recorded when the ball began descending, not when it reached the bottom. With the commencement of radio time signals (in Britain from 1924), time balls gradually became obsolete and many were demolished in the 1920s.

A contemporary version of the concept has been used since 31 December 1907 at New York City's Times Square as part of its New Year's Eve celebrations; at 11:59 p.m., a lit ball descends from a pole on the roof of One Times Square over the course of 60 seconds, reaching its conclusion at 12:00 a.m. The spectacle—which has given rise to many similar events—was inspired by an employee of The New York Times having seen the time ball on the Western Union Building in operation.

== Around the world ==
Over sixty time balls remain standing, though many are no longer operational. Existing time balls include:

=== Australia ===
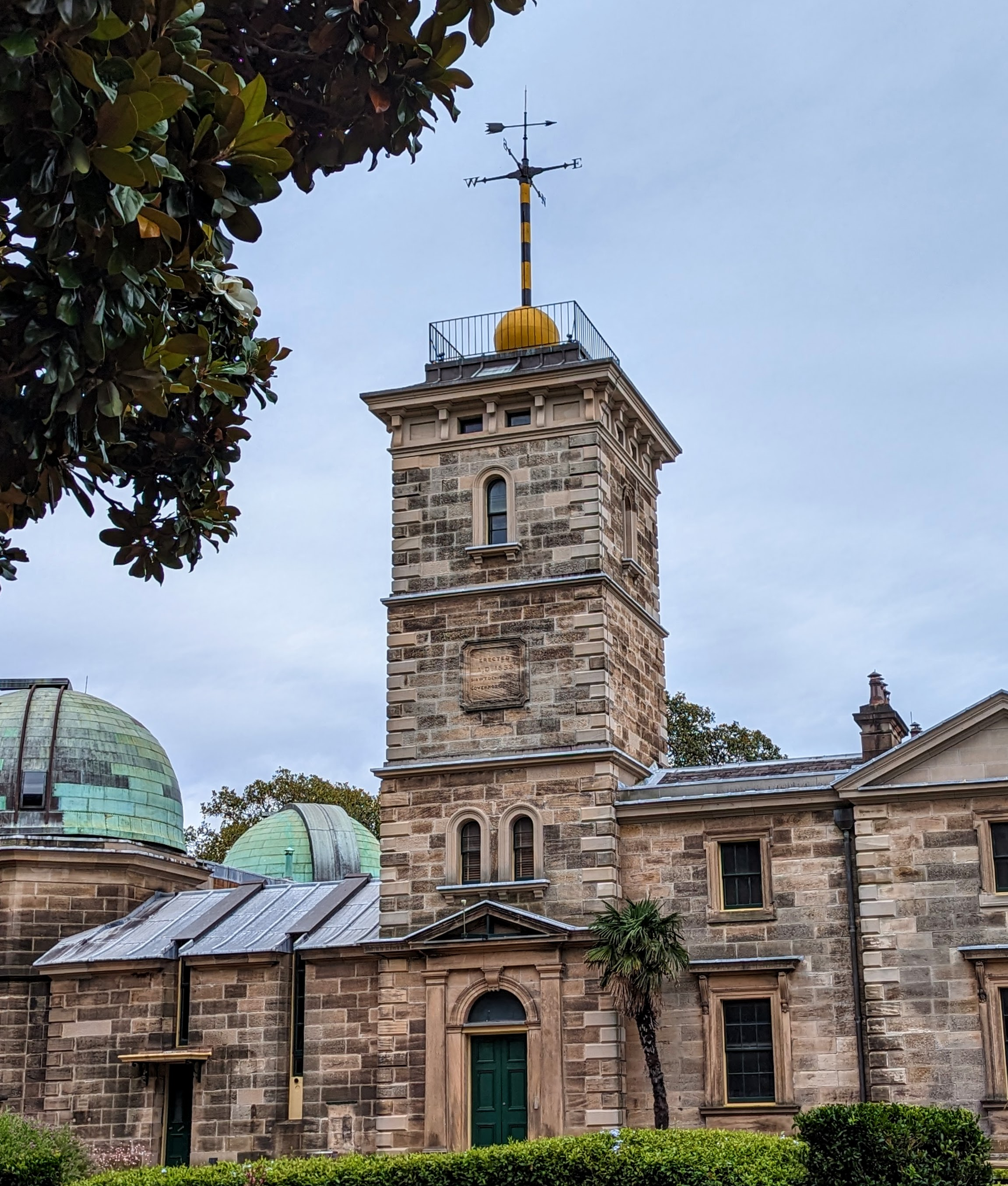
Sydney Observatory with time ball

- The Old Windmill, Brisbane, Queensland
- Fremantle, Western Australia
- Sydney Observatory, New South Wales
- Newcastle Customs House, New South Wales
- Semaphore, South Australia
- Williamstown Lighthouse, Victoria
- Geelong Telegraph Station, Victoria

=== Canada ===
- Citadelle of Quebec, Quebec City no longer true.

Clearly seen from the river and aligned on the meridian for observation purposes, Building 20, also known as the Ball House, is the former observatory and time ball tower.

=== New Zealand ===
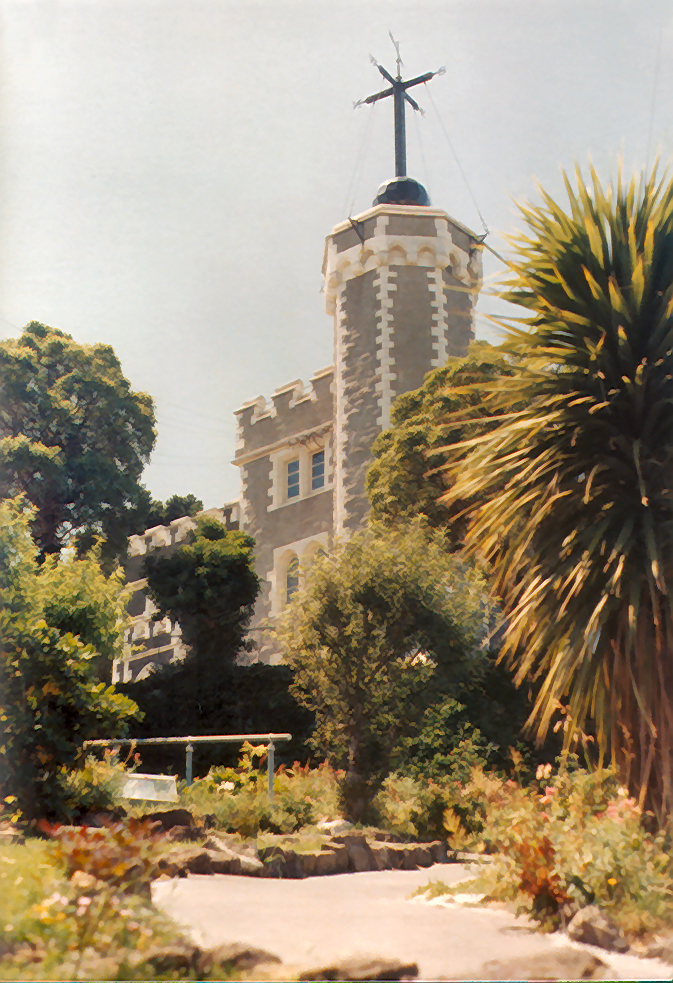
The time ball at Port Lyttelton, New Zealand, started signalling Greenwich Mean Time to ships in the harbour beginning in 1876. The Lyttelton Timeball Station was destroyed by an earthquake in 2011 but was rebuilt and reopened in 2018.

In March 1864 New Zealand's first time ball was established at Wellington. This was followed by Port Chalmers in June 1867, Wanganui in October 1874, Lyttelton in December 1876 and Timaru in 1888. Attempts were made by some people in Auckland to establish time balls there from 1864 onwards, but these were not recognized by the authorities until a permanent time ball was mounted on the Ferry Building in August 1901.

- Port Chalmers: Established by the Otago Provincial Council on top of Observation Point in Port Chalmers in June 1867 the time ball service initially operated at 1 pm on all days of the week except Sundays. The service was discontinued in October 1877, but following concerns raised by 11 shipmasters the service resumed in April 1882 as a weekly service. In 1910 the time keeping service was discontinued but the ball however continued to be used until 1931 as a warning device. It was removed in 1970 but a replacement was restored to service in 2020.
- Lyttelton: Established in December 1876 the Lyttelton Timeball Station in Lyttelton, New Zealand, was operational until it was damaged in the 2010 Canterbury earthquake. Further severe damage occurred in the February 2011 Christchurch earthquake, and a decision was made in March 2011 to dismantle the building, a danger to the public, but the tower collapsed during the major aftershock that hit the Lyttelton area on 13 June 2011. In November 2012, a large financial donation was made available to contribute towards rebuilding the tower, a project the community considered. On 25 May 2013, it was announced that the tower and ball would be restored, and that funds were to be sought from the community to rebuild the rest of the station. The station was officially reopened on 2 November 2018.

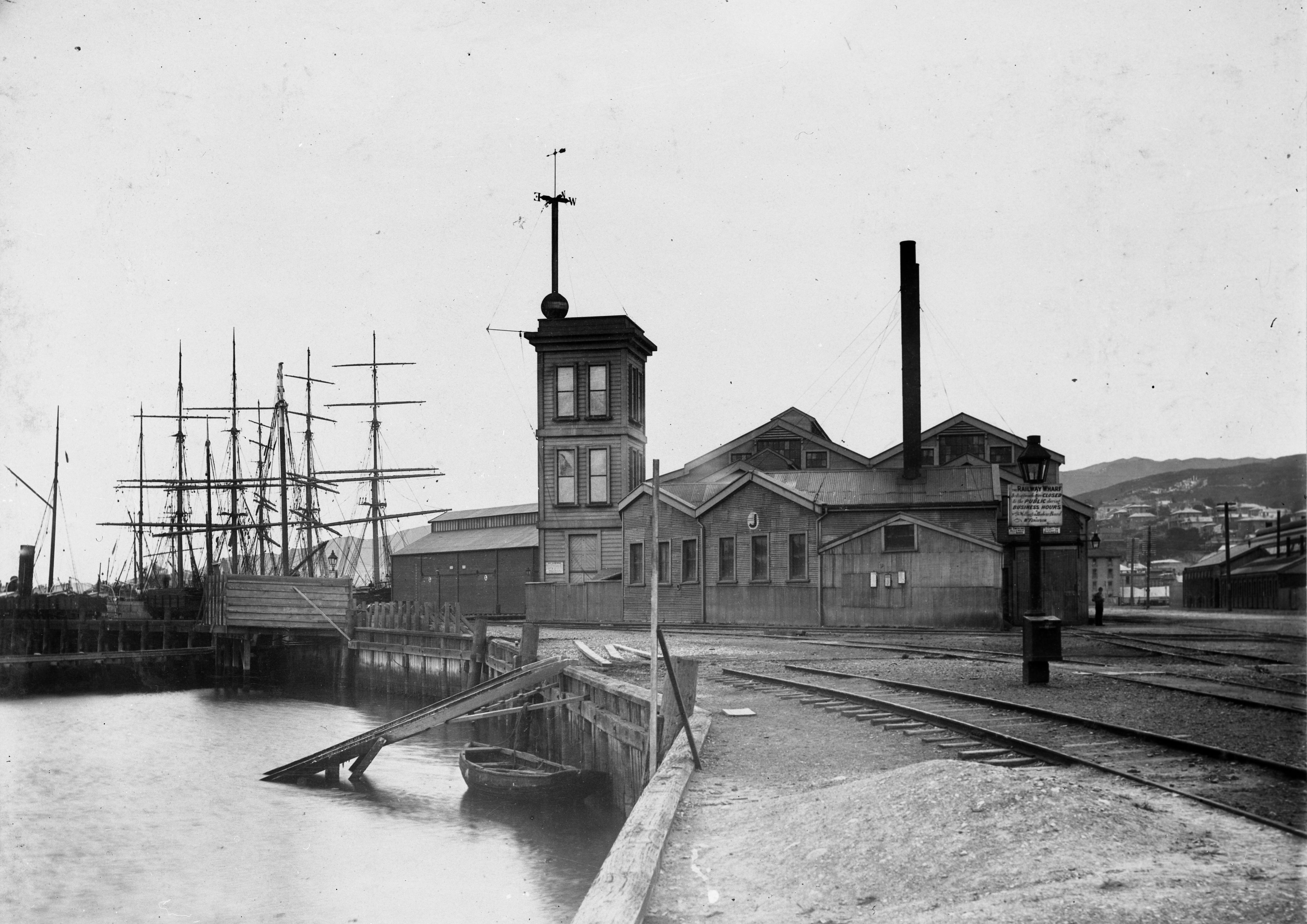
J Shed, Wellington Woolstore, showing the Time Ball at its second site c. 1900

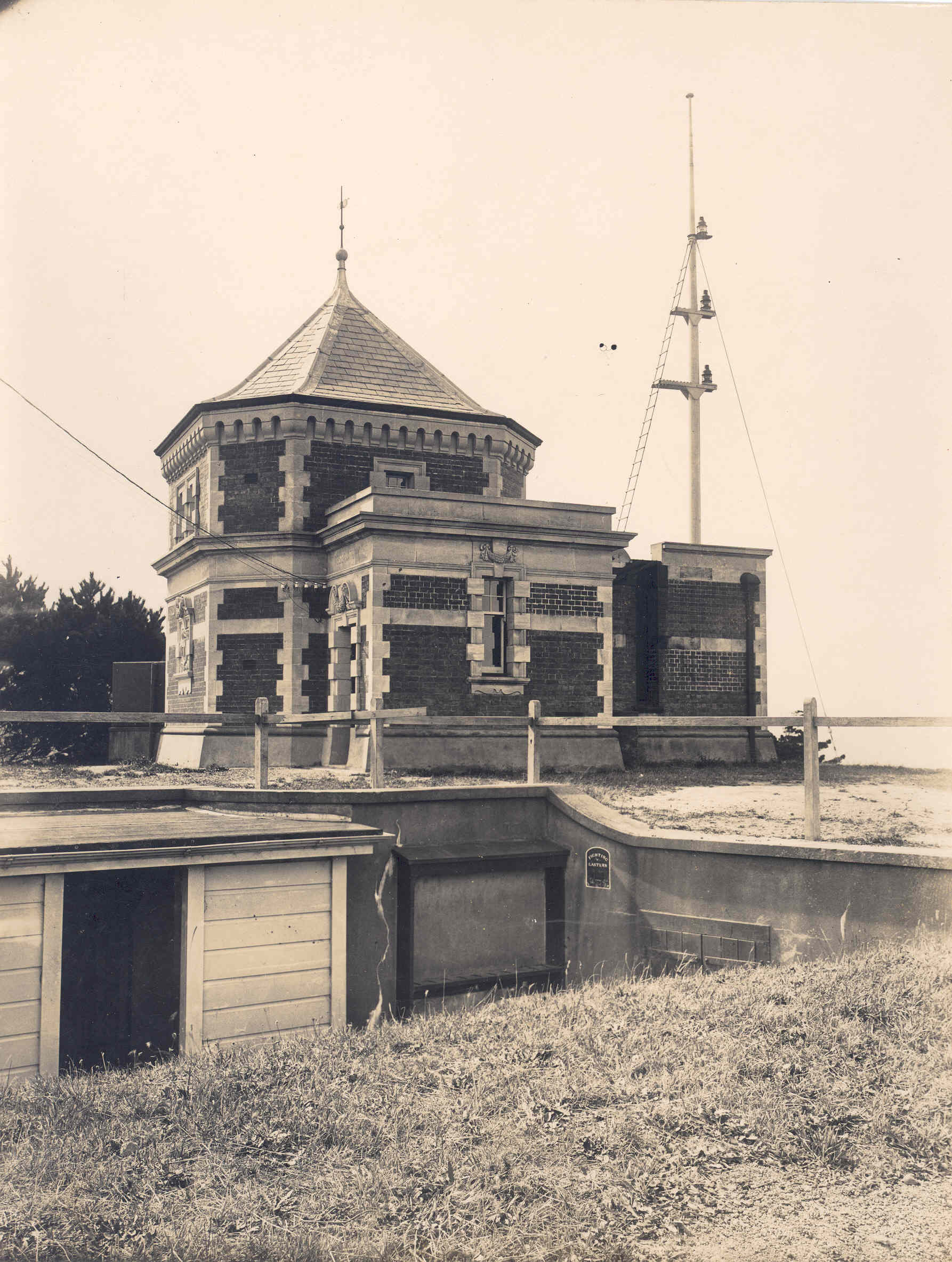
The Time Light arrangement at Dominion Observatory in Wellington c. 1913

- Wellington:The Wellington time ball service started in March 1864. It received its time information from the Dominion Observatory which was also communicated to the Lyttelton time ball service. Dunedin used local observatory facilities. Wellington had two time ball sites – the time ball was erected at the first site by mid-January 1864 on top of the Custom House building on the Wellington waterfront and later relocated in 1888 to the J Shed Woolstore on top of the accumulator tower. This building and the time ball burnt down on 9 March 1909. Instead of replacing the Wellington time ball after the second site burnt down, time light signals were introduced at the Dominion Observatory. The earliest record of this was 22 February 1912. They were in use until 1937 when wireless signals took over as the new way to keep time.

=== Poland ===
- Gdańsk, Poland (The time ball was installed in 1876, moved to the Danzig (now Gdańsk) lighthouse in 1894, and removed in 1929. In 2008 it was reconstructed from original plans)

=== South Africa ===
- Victoria & Alfred Waterfront, Cape Town

=== Spain ===
- The Real Instituto y Observatorio de la Armada in San Fernando, Cádiz continues to activate its time ball every day at 13:00 (ROA Time). After better timekeeping at sea made it obsolete, it was disabled, but it was reactivated in the late 20th century.
- The Royal House of the Post Office in Puerta del Sol, Madrid, formerly operated a time ball for Madrid. The ball continues to be activated annually at midnight on New Year's Eve, serving as the traditional focal point for celebrations in the country.

=== United Kingdom ===
- Timeball Tower, Deal, Kent, England. Operates hourly and has recently been refurbished.
- Margate Clock Tower, Kent, England
- Royal Observatory, Greenwich, England
- Time Ball Buildings, Leeds, England
- Guildhall, Kingston upon Hull, England. The only maritime timepiece on a municipal building. It dates back to 1918 and is the highest in the UK.
- Clock Tower, Brighton, East Sussex, England. (originally operated hourly, but was later stopped as it was too noisy)
- Nelson's Monument on Calton Hill, Edinburgh, Scotland
- Flat Iron Building in Prescot, Merseyside. Added during restoration of the building, the timeball dates from the 1800s but is controlled by a newly-built mechanism.

=== United States ===
- United States Naval Observatory, Washington D.C.
- Titanic Memorial, New York City
- Plymouth Light, Gurnet Point, Plymouth, Massachusetts

== Gallery ==
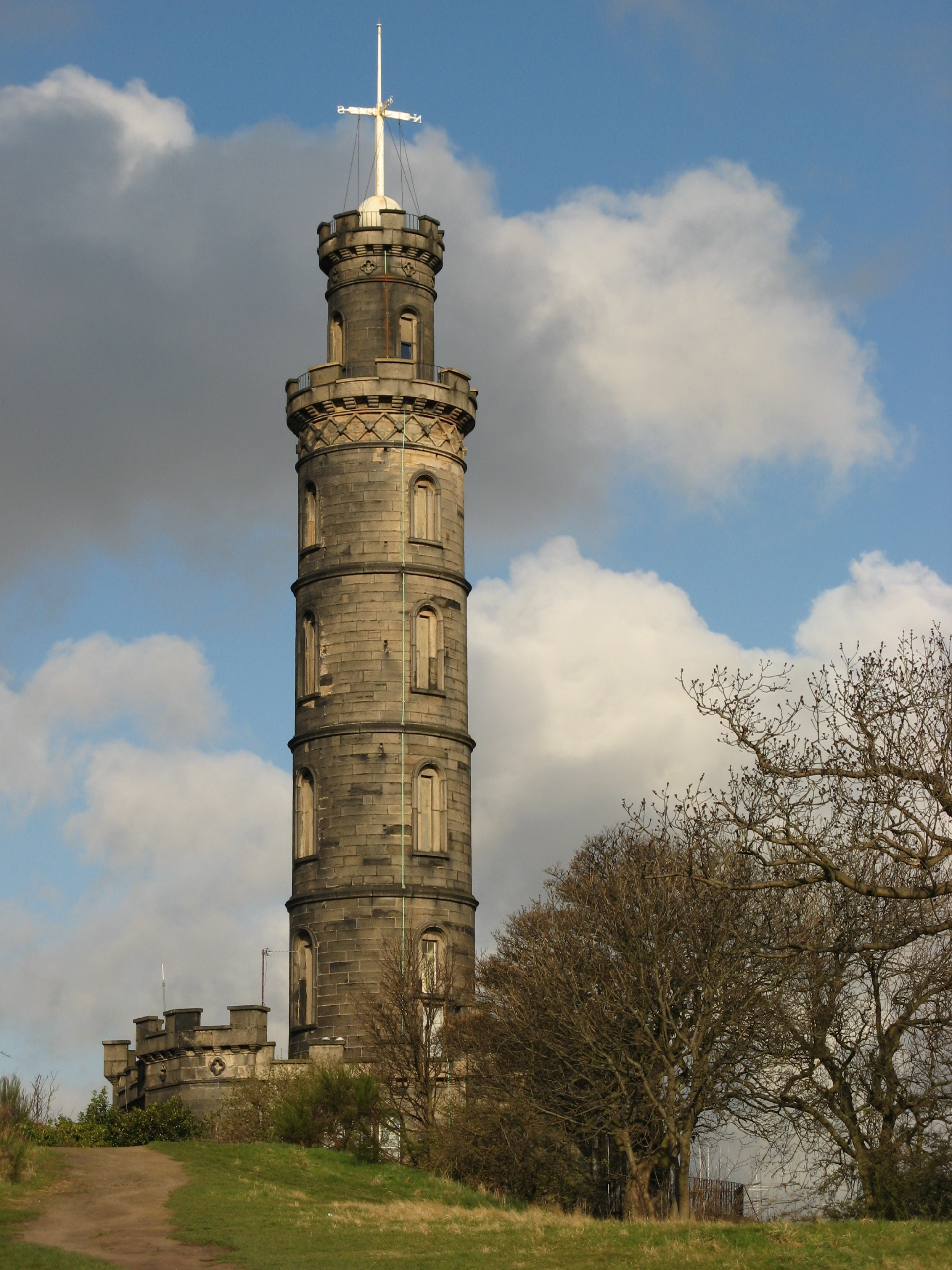
The Nelson Monument, Edinburgh, UK

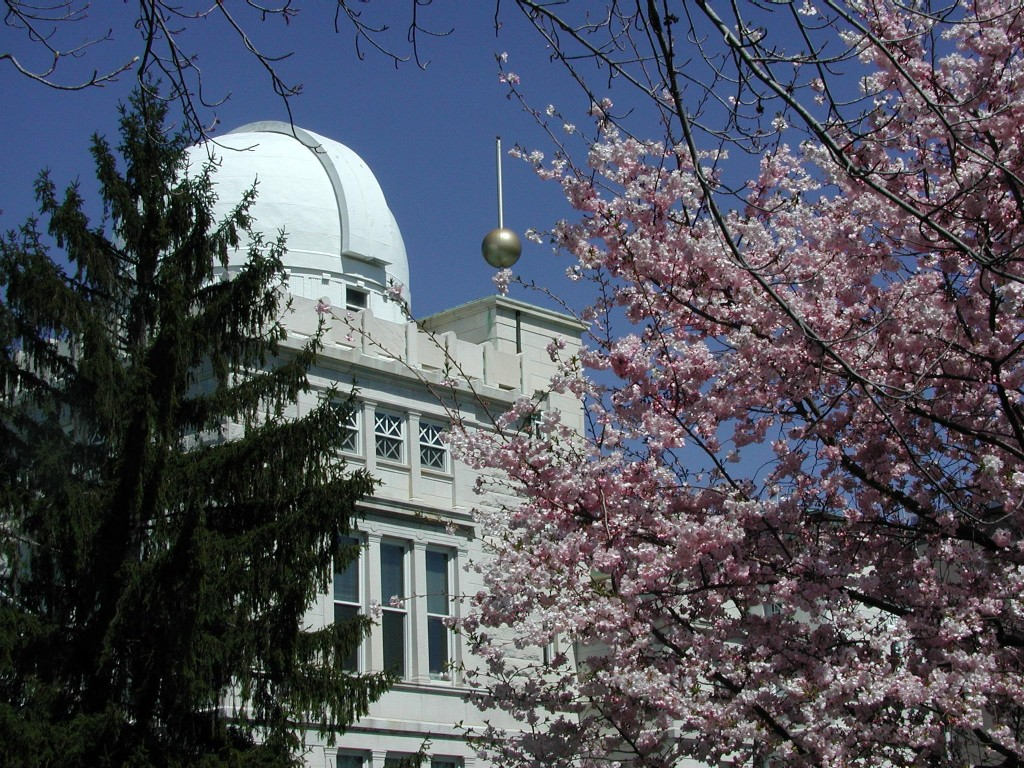
United States Naval Observatory, Washington, D.C., US

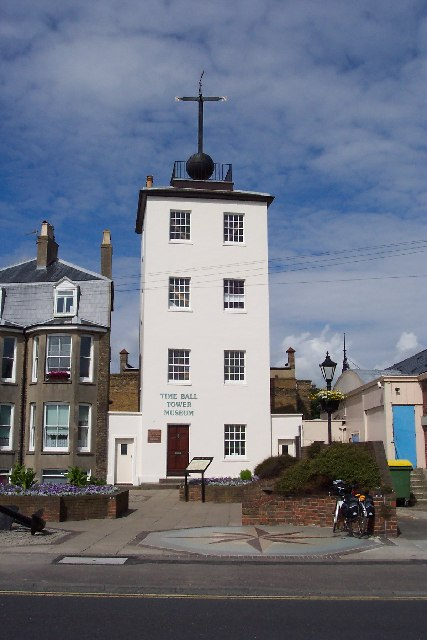
Deal Timeball, Deal, UK

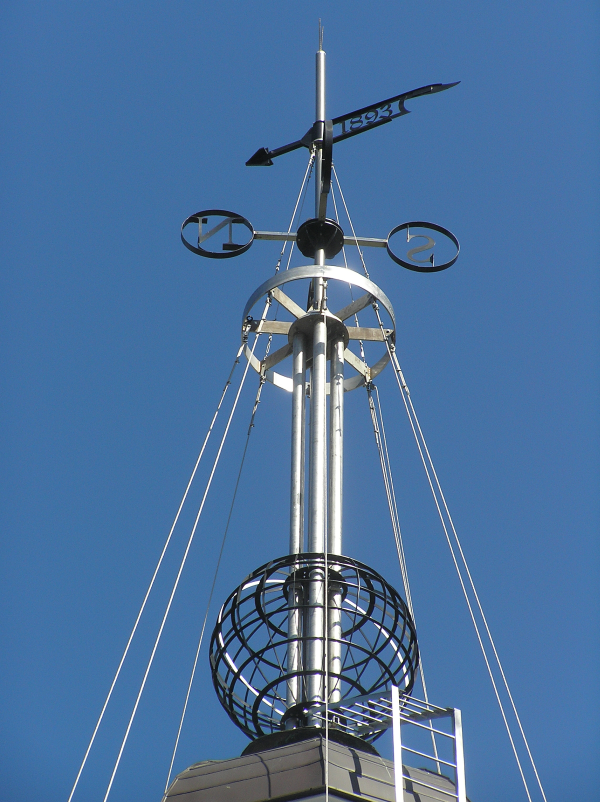
Gdańsk, Poland

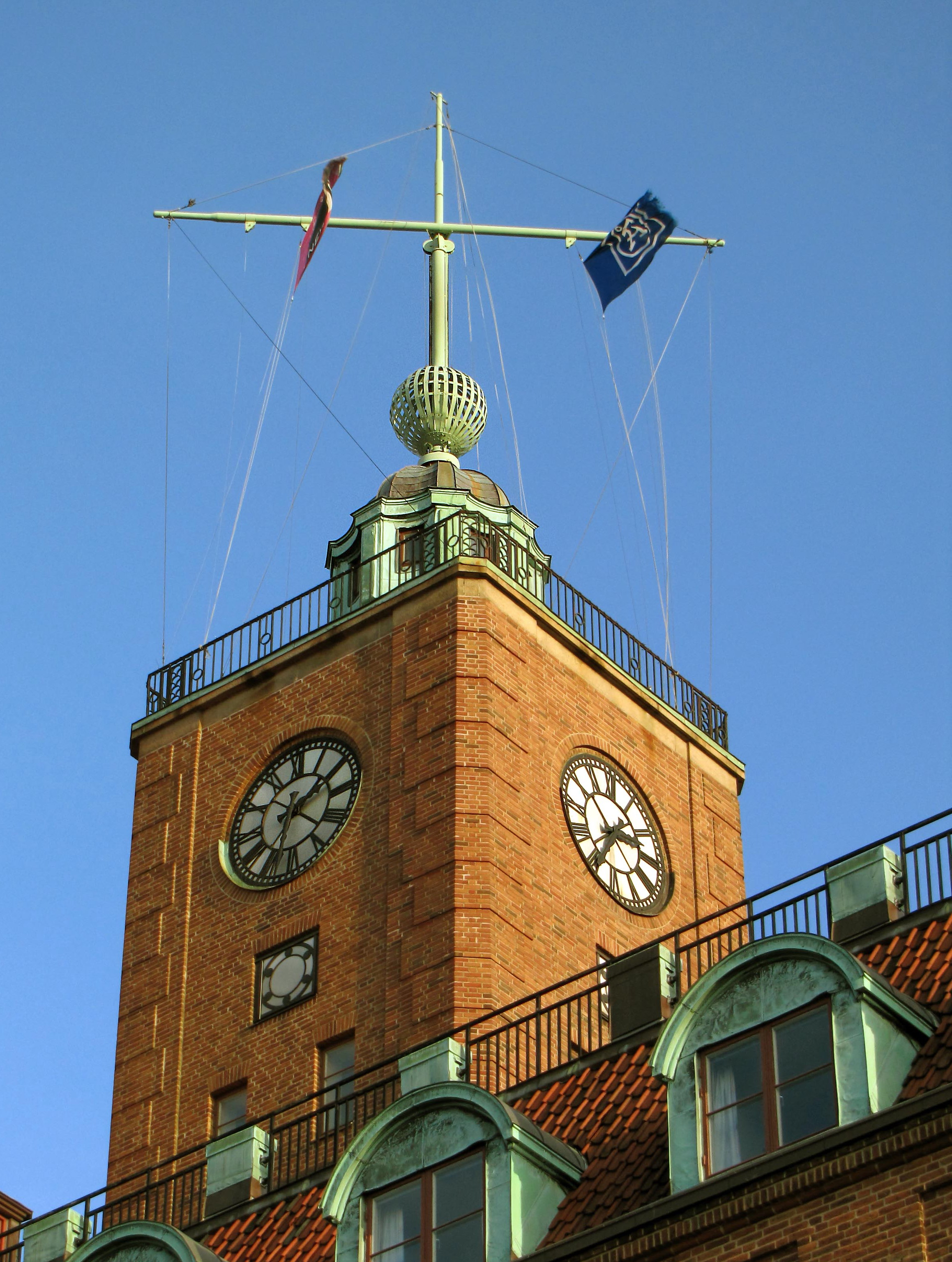
Gothenburg, Sweden

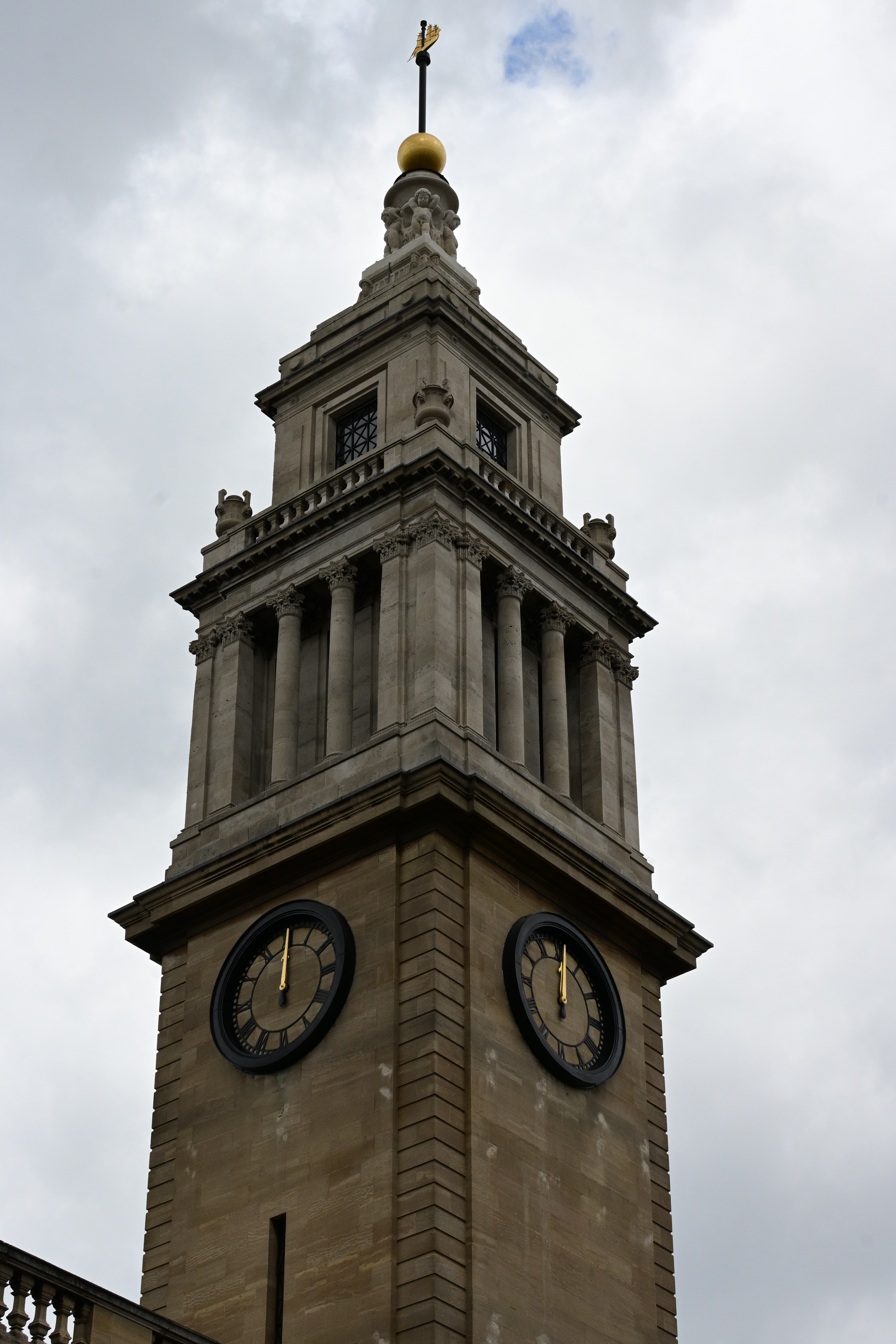
Guildhall, Kingston upon Hull, UK

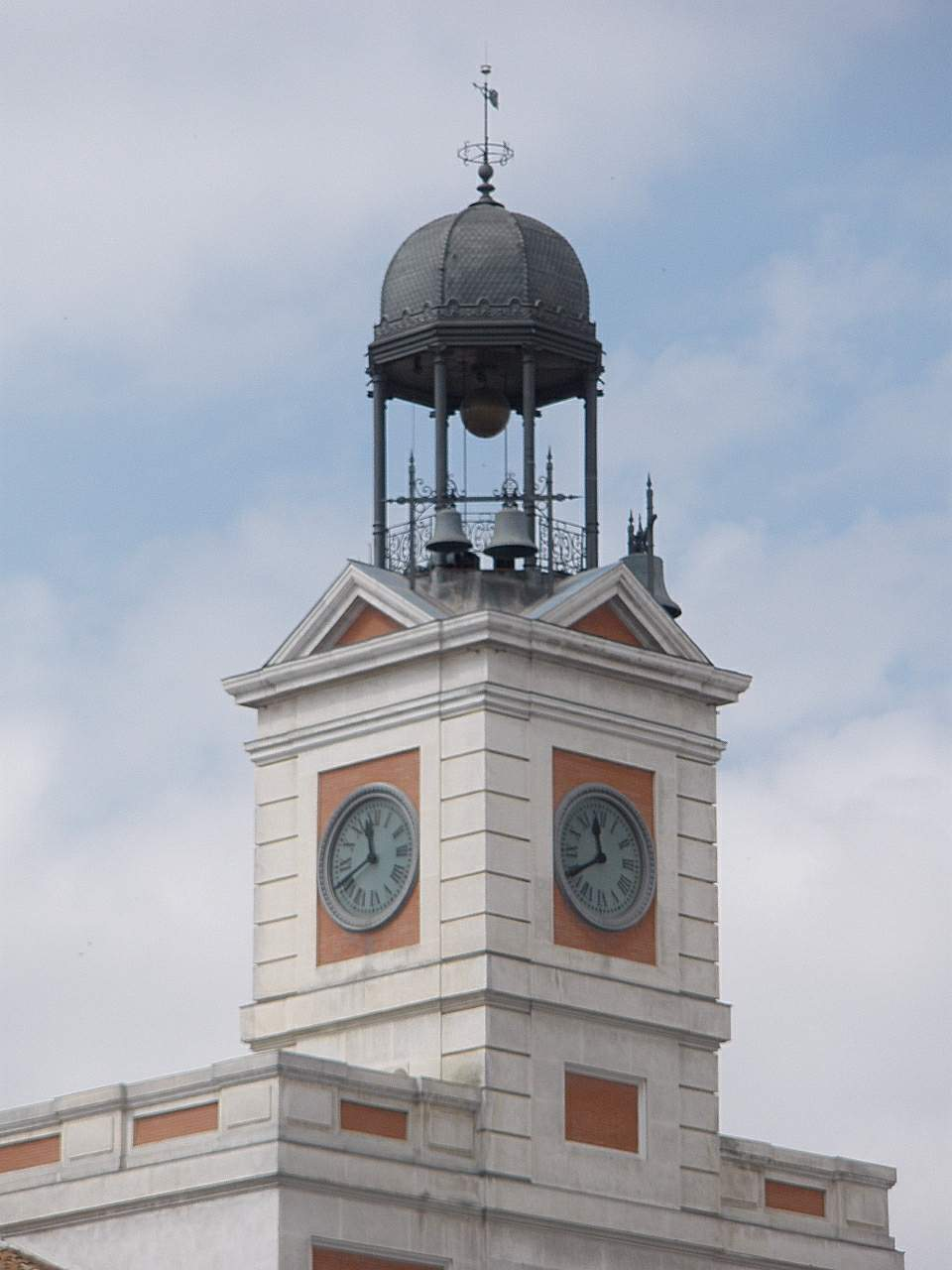
Royal House of the Post Office, Madrid, Spain

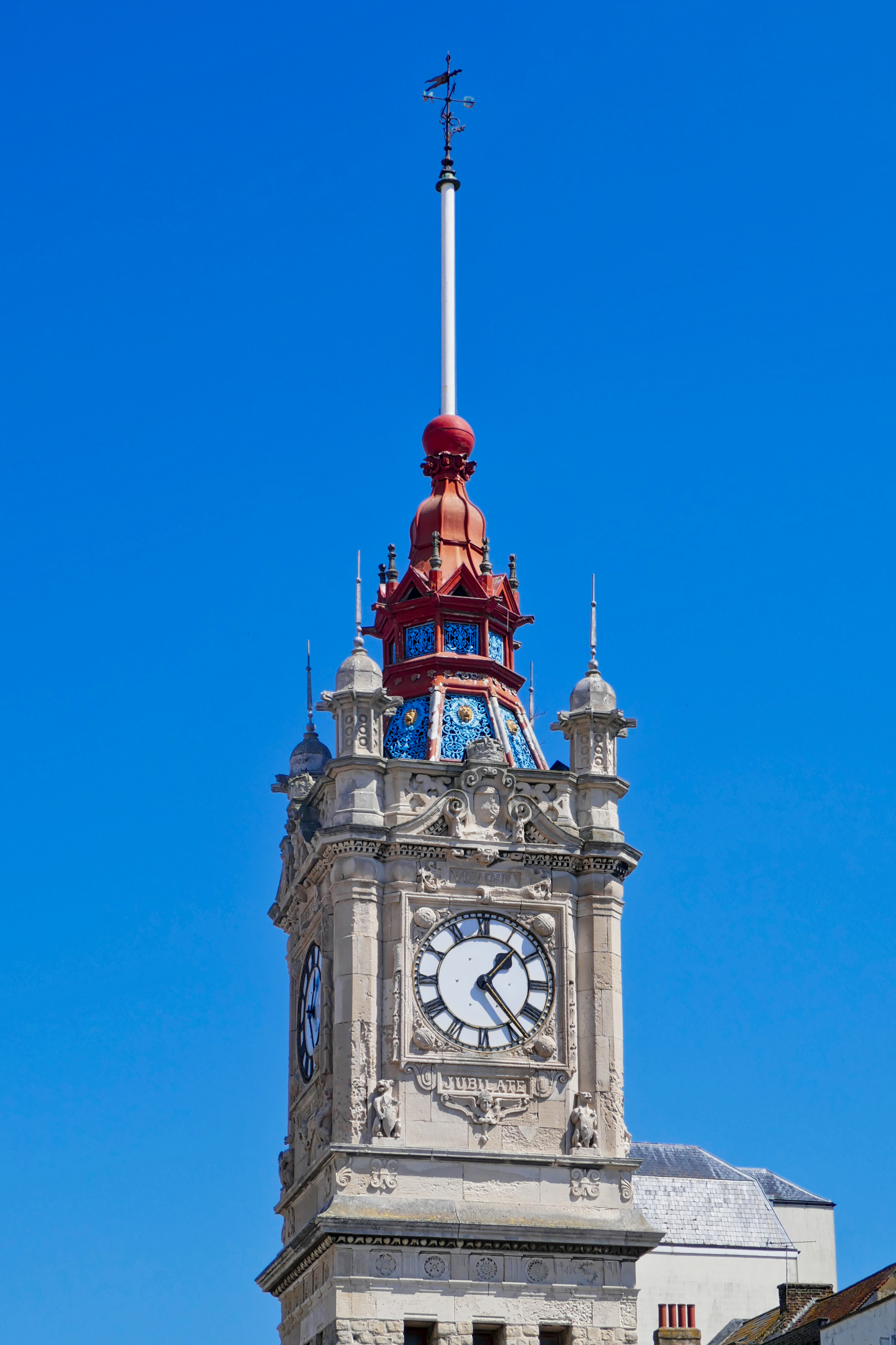
Clock tower, Margate, Kent, UK

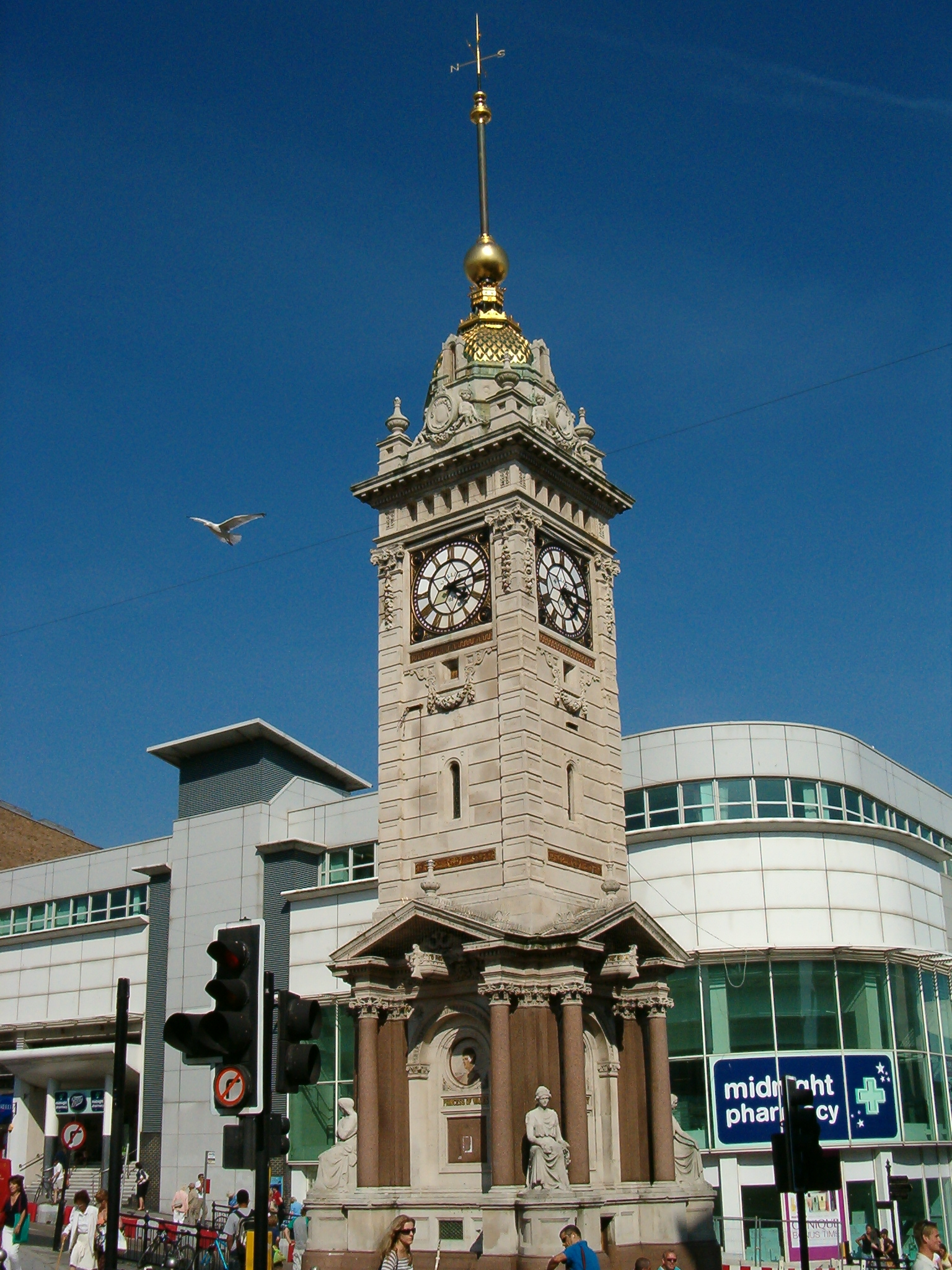
Clock tower, Brighton, UK

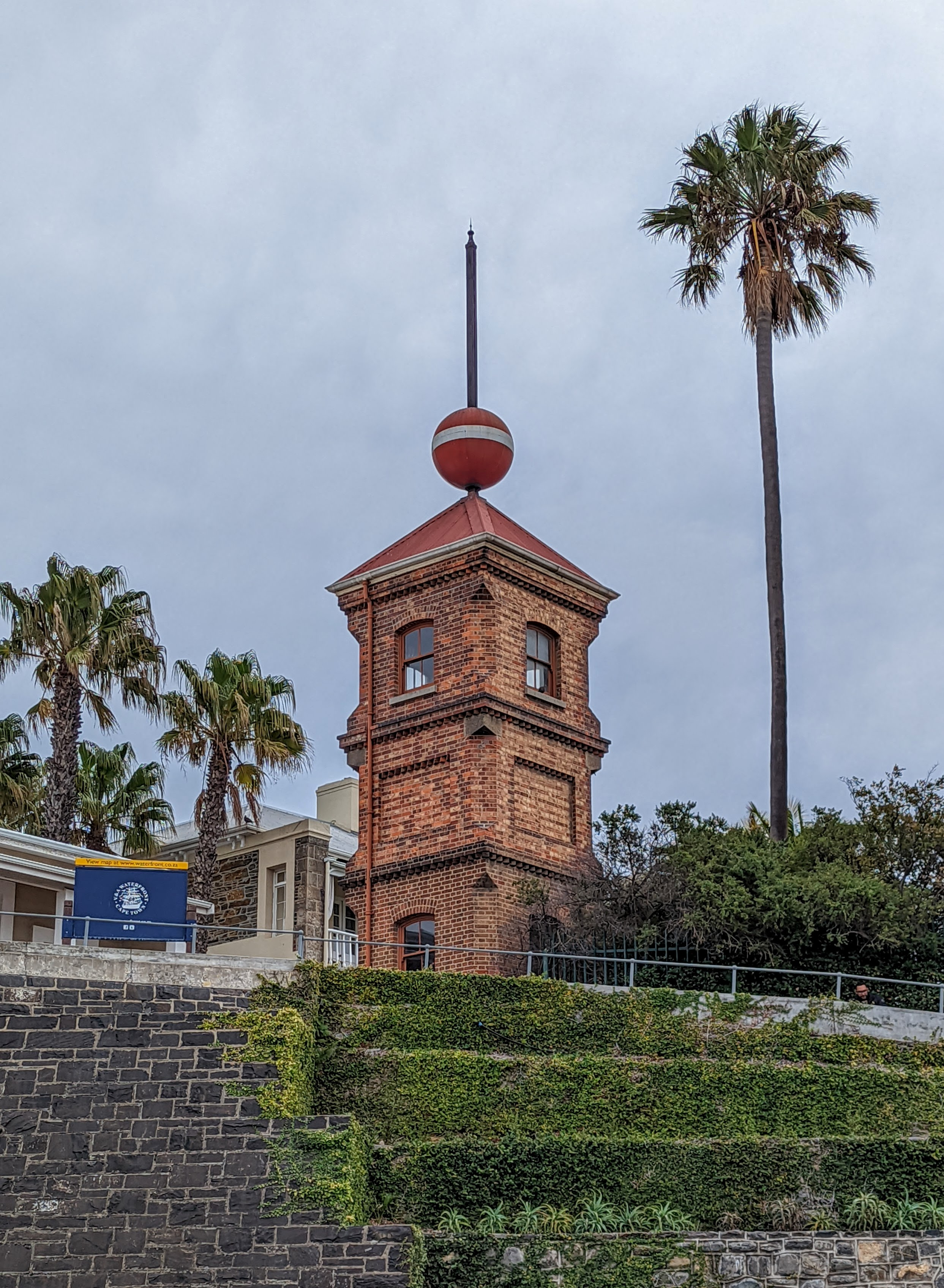
Time ball, Cape Town, South Africa

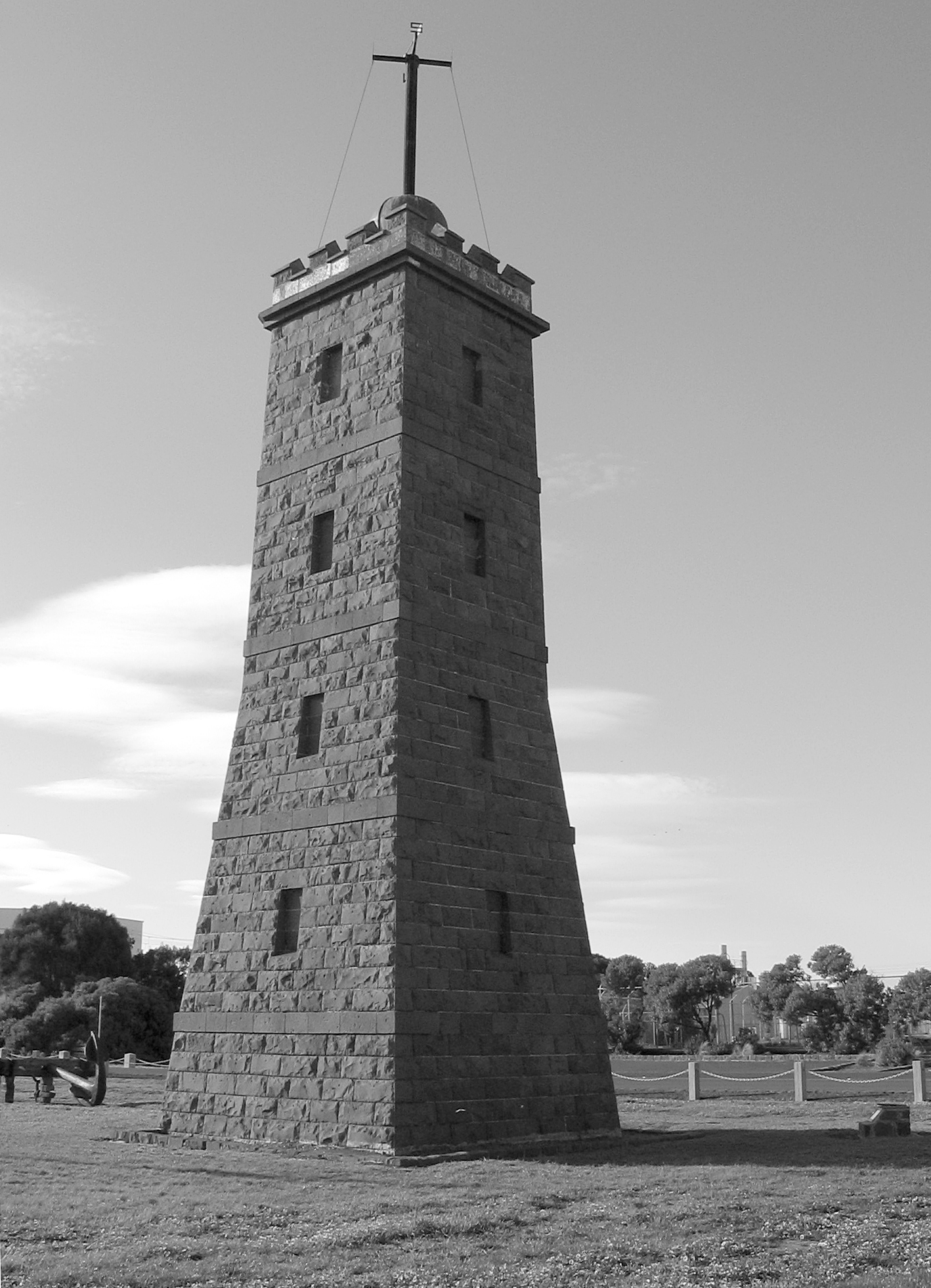
Time ball, Williamstown Lighthouse, Victoria, Australia

== See also ==
- Blackhead Point, in Hong Kong, where a time ball was operated from 1908 to 1933
- History of longitude
- Shepherd Gate Clock
- Time signal
- Weather ball
- Greenwich Mean Time (GMT)
- Times Square Ball
