= Real Academia de Medicina y Cirugía de Sevilla =

The Real Academia de Medicina y Cirugía de Sevilla (The Royal Academy of Medicine and Surgery of Seville) (RAMSE) is one of the oldest medical institutions in Spain.

== History ==
The Academia was founded in 1693 as the Veneranda Tertulia Médica Hispalense (Venerable Spanish Medical Assembly) by Sevillian physician Juan Muñoz y Peralta and Murcian physician Diego Mateo Zapata. It was the first medical institution in Spain.

In 2015, Edgardo D. Carosella became the first non-Spanish member of the Academia.

== Activities ==
The RAMSE is located in Seville, Spain, on 10-12 Abades Street with a geographic area of action that includes the provinces of Seville, Cordoba and Huelva. Its objectives are the promotion of health in terms of physical, psychological and social wellbeing, as well as, the contribution to expansion of knowledge of medical sciences in their different areas and specialties.

The RAMSE has a library that has been enriched throughout more than three hundred years of its uninterrupted existence. Currently it is keeping more than 13.000 books, of which 902 constitute the Old Collection. This collection contains works prior to 1826, made up of four incunabula books, eight post incunabula and many other rare or curious books, of which 568 are already digitized in full text to facilitate online consultation.

Associated with the RAMSE exists the Foundation-RAMSE, which has the function of facilitating the development of the Academy´s objectives acting as an interlocutor with its collaborators.

== Presidence ==
- ...-2022: Jesús Castiñeiras Fernández
- Since 2022: Carlos A. Infantes Alcón
