= Rear Occupant Alert =

Rear Occupant Alert (ROA) is motor vehicle manufacturer Hyundai Motor Company's automated vehicle alert system to detect the presence of an occupant in the rear seat of a passenger motor vehicle.

The basic system uses door logic. If a rear door is opened and closed and the vehicle is turned on, a dashboard alert will activate when the vehicle is then turned off and the driver begins to exit the vehicle. An enhanced system, called Ultrasonic Rear Occupant Alert, also uses ultrasonic sensors. If the vehicle is locked and the ultrasonic sensors on the headlining detect movement in the rear seats, the system will flash the hazards lights and sound the horn for 25 seconds, and again if the system continue to detect movement, for up to eight times total.

Other motor vehicle manufacturers' systems include General Motors's Rear Seat Reminder, Nissan's Rear Door Alert, and Subaru's Rear Seat Reminder.

In the United States, a proposed law would make such a system mandatory in passenger vehicles.
