= ROA Time =

Official time of Spain

ROA Time is the official time of Spain. It is established by ROA, the Royal Institute and Observatory of the Armada (Armada being the name of the Spanish Navy in Spanish), at San Fernando, Cádiz.

== Broadcasting methods ==
ROA broadcasts the official time in Spain using the following methods:

1. Transmission of time signals in HF in two daily intervals of 25 minutes. From 10:00 UTC to 10:25 UTC on 15.006 MHz and from 10:30 UTC to 10:55 UTC on 4.998 MHz. The station is a Harris RF-130 with 1kW of power broadcasting from San Fernando (Cádiz). This is the only radio broadcast of official time in Spain as there is no longwave station broadcasting time signals such as DCF77 from Germany or MSF60 (also known as NPL) from the United Kingdom.
2. Via hotline (Phone number: +34 956 59 94 29), using a time information broadcasting protocol widely used in Europe (European Telephone Code Standard). Access is limited to two minutes per call and admits international calls.
3. NTP Protocol (Network Time Protocol), through two Internet servers placed in San Fernando and a third one placed in Madrid (NTP Servers: hora.roa.es and minuto.roa.es, both available through ntp.roa.es).
4. Timestamping. The ROA, as a TSA (Time Stamping Authority), provides a timestamping server for official certifications through a standard digital certificate x509 v3. This system is used by the whole public administration in Spain for timestamping their transactions. This service is available through the SARA Network (Sistema de Aplicaciones y Redes para las Administraciones).
