= Röa =

Röa may refer to several places in Estonia:

- Röa, Järva County, a village in Väätsa Parish, Järva County
- Röa, Rapla County, a village in Rapla Parish, Rapla County
