= Racehorse Owners Association =

British horse racing organization

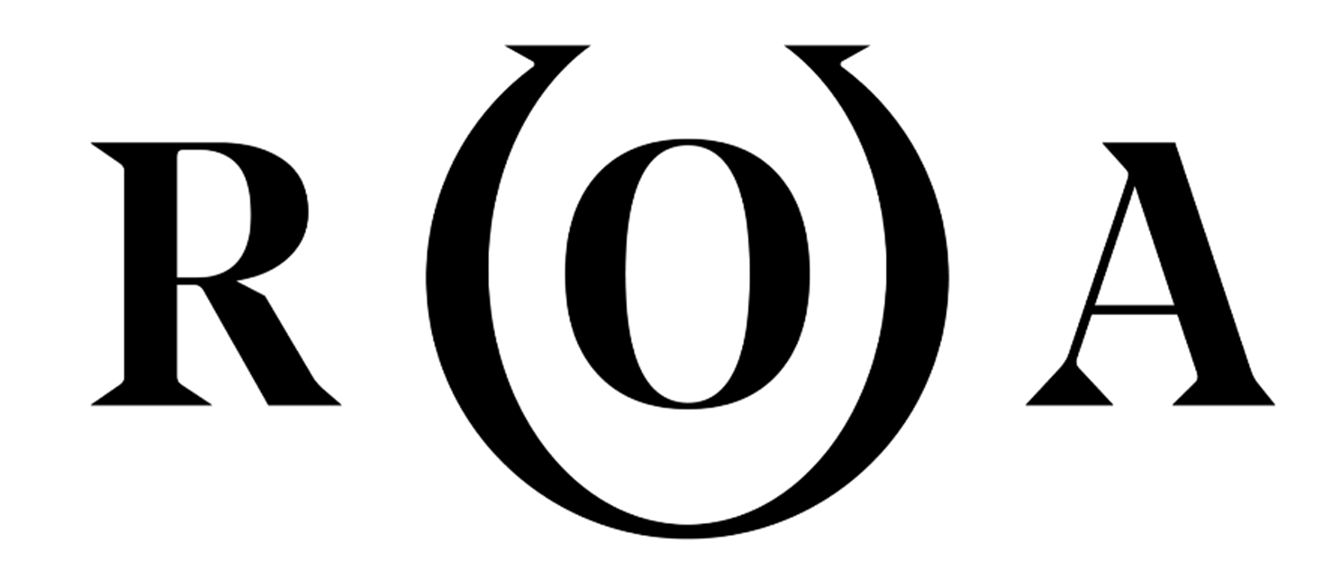
ROA Logo

The Racehorse Owners Association (ROA) is a British horse racing organisation that promotes and protects the interests of racehorse owners in Great Britain. As one of the British Horseracing Authority's (BHA) shareholders, the ROA play a central role in British racing politics and finance.

== History ==
Founded in 1945 by Sir Malcolm McAlpine, the ROA is run by a team of seven, headed up by the Chief Executive, Charlie Liverton.

The ROA has a Board of 12 members, with elected board members required to stand for re-election every four years. The current President of the ROA is Charlie Parker.

The organisation is based in Reading. The ROA is a founder member of The Thoroughbred Group, which represents owners, trainers, jockeys, breeders and stable staff.^{[2]}
