= International Academy of Medical and Biological Engineering =

Biomedical Academy

The International Academy of Medical and Biological Engineering (IAMBE) is a non-profit society of distinguished scholars engaged in medical and biological engineering research to further the field of biomedical engineering or bioengineering. The academy is composed of Fellows who have made significant contributions to and played leadership roles in the field of medical and biological engineering. The academy is affiliated with the International Federation for Medical and Biological Engineering (IFMBE), an international organization consisting of more than 60 national and transnational societies of biomedical engineering, representing over 120,000 members.

The academy was established by International Federation for Medical and Biological Engineering in 1997 to honor individuals who have contributed significantly to the theory and practice of medical and biological engineering, and made extraordinary leadership efforts in promoting the field of medical and biological engineering.

The academy has engaged in public debates in identifying grand challenges in engineering life sciences, and played an advisory role to the leadership of International Federation for Medical and Biological Engineering. A recent conference endorsed by the academy is IEEE Life Sciences Grand Challenges Conference, which consists of distinguished speakers including Nobel Laureate, National Medal of Sciences Laureate, National Medal of Technology Laureate, president of National Academy of Engineering, director of National Institute of Biomedical Imaging and Bioengineering of NIH, and chair of the International Academy of Medical and Biological Engineering.

Fellow nominations are accepted either annually or every three years. Fellows may be nominated by a fellow of the academy or by International Federation for Medical and Biological Engineering. The nominations are screened by the Membership Committee of the academy. Election to Fellow status is subject to a vote by all current Fellows.

The founding chair of the academy is Robert Nerem, Parker H. Petit Distinguished Chair for Engineering in Medicine and Institute Professor at the Georgia Institute of Technology. The immediate Past Chair of the academy is Niilo Saranummi, Research Professor at VTT Technical Research Centre of Finland and Past President of International Federation for Medical and Biological Engineering. The current chair of the academy is Roger Kamm, Cecil and Ida Green Professor of Biological and Mechanical Engineering at the Massachusetts Institute of Technology.

== List of fellows ==
- Metin Akay, '12, University of Houston, USA
- Joji Ando, '09, Dokkyo Medical University, Japan
- Lars Arendt-Nielsen, '03, Aalborg University, Denmark
- Kazuhiko Atsumi, FF, FE, University of Tokyo, Japan
- Albert Avolio, '12, Macquarie University, Australia
- Jing Bai, '12, Tsinghua University, China
- James Bassingthwaighte, '09, University of Washington, USA
- Rebecca Bergman, '12, Medtronic, USA
- Marcello Bracale, '03, University of Naples Federico II, Italy
- Per-Ingvar Branemark, '00, University of Gothenburg, Sweden
- Colin Caro, '00, Imperial College London, UK
- Ewart Carson, '06, City University London, UK
- Sergio Cerutti, '03, Polytechnic University in Milan (Politecnico), Italy
- Walter H. Chang, '06, Chung Yuan Christian University, Taiwan
- Shu Chien, '00, University of California San Diego, USA
- Jean-Louis Coatrieux, '02, University of Rennes 1, France
- Richard S. C. Cobbold, FF, University of Toronto, Canada
- Paolo Dario, '03, Sant'Anna School of Advanced Studies of Pisa, Italy
- Ivan Daskalov, '03 (Deceased), Bulgarian Academy of Sciences, Bulgaria
- David Delpy, '03, Engineering and Physical Sciences Research Council (EPSRC), UK
- Jacques Demongeot, '12, University Joseph Fourier, France
- André Dittmar, '12, Centre national de la recherche scientifique (CNRS), France
- Takeyoshi Dohi, '06, University of Tokyo, Japan
- Olaf Doessel, '12, Karlsruhe Institute of Technology, Germany
- Floyd Dunn, FF, FE, University of Illinois at Urbana-Champaign, USA
- Shmuel Einav, '05, Tel Aviv University, Israel
- Ross Ethier, '09, Imperial College London, UK
- Uwe Faust, FF, FE, University of Stuttgart, Germany
- Leszek Filipczynski, FF, FE (Deceased), Polish Academy of Sciences, Poland
- Yuan-Cheng B. Fung, FF, FE, University of California San Diego, USA
- Leslie Alexander Geddes, FF (Deceased), University of Toronto, Canada
- Amit Gefen, '14, Tel Aviv University, Israel
- Morteza Gharib, '12, California Institute of Technology, USA
- Bin He, '12, University of Minnesota, USA
- Hiie Hinrikus, '03, Tallinn University of Technology, Estonia
- Nozomu Hoshimiya, '06, Tohoku Gakuin University, Japan
- Peter Hunter, '03, University of Auckland, New Zealand
- Helmut Hutten, '03, Graz University of Technology, Austria
- Dov Jaron, '06, Drexel University, USA
- Fumihiko Kajiya, '00, Kawasaki University of Medical Welfare, Japan
- Akira Kamiya, '02, Nihon University, Japan
- Roger D. Kamm, '06, Massachusetts Institute of Technology, USA
- Hiroshi Kanai, FF, FE, Tohoku University, Japan
- Zhenhuang Kang, FF, Chengdu University of Science and Technology, China
- Toivo Katila, '03, Helsinki University central Hospital, Finland
- Richard E. Kerber, '09, University of Iowa, USA
- Makoto Kikuchi, '12, National Defence Medical College, Japan
- Yongmin Kim, '09, Pohang University of Science and Technology, South Korea
- Richard Kitney, '03, Imperial College London, UK
- Peter Kneppo, '03, Czech Technical University, Czech Republic
- Pablo Laguna, '12, University of Zaragoza, Spain
- Daniel Laurent, FF, FE, Universite Marne-La-Vallee, France
- Raphael Lee, '12, University of Chicago, USA
- Peter Lewin, '12, Drexel University, USA
- Pai-Chi Li, '09, National Taiwan University, Taiwan
- Zhi-Pei Liang, '12, University of Illinois at Urbana-Champaign, USA
- John H. Linehan, '06, Northwestern University, USA
- Jaakko Malmivuo, '03, Tampere University of Technology, Finland
- Roman Maniewski, '03, Polish Academy of Sciences, Poland
- Andrew McCulloch, '05, University of California San Diego, USA
- Jean-Pierre Morucci, FE, National Institute of Health and Medical Research, France
- Joachim Nagel, '12, University of Stuttgart, Germany
- Maciej Nalecz, FF, FE (Deceased), Polish Academy of Sciences, Poland
- Robert M. Nerem, FF, Georgia Institute of Technology, USA
- Peter Niederer, '00, ETH Zurich, Switzerland
- Benno M. Nigg, '00, University of Calgary, Canada
- Marc Nyssen, '12, Free University Brussels, Belgium
- P. Ake Oberg, FF, Linkoping University, Sweden
- Kazuo Ogino, '12, Nihon Kohden Corporation, Japan
- Nicolas Pallikarakis, '05, University of Patras, Greece
- John P Paul, FF, FE, University of Strathclyde, UK
- Antonio Pedotti, '00, Politecnico di Milano, Italy
- Robert Plonsey, FF, FE, Duke University, USA
- Leandre Pourcelot, '00, Francois Rabelais University, France
- Jose Principe, '12, University of Florida, USA
- Basil Proimos, FE, University of Patras, Greece
- Buddy D. Ratner, '00, University of Washington, USA
- Gunter Rau, FF, RWTH Aachen University, Germany
- Robert S Reneman, '03, Maastricht University, Netherlands
- James B. Reswick, FF, FE, U.S. Department of Education, USA
- Nandor Richter, FF, FE, National Institute for Hospital and Medical Engineering, Hungary
- Laura Roa, '03, University of Seville, Spain
- Fernand A Roberge, FF, University of Montreal, Canada
- Colin Roberts, '02, King's College London, UK
- Peter Rolfe, FF, Oxford BioHorizons Ltd., UK, and Harbin Institute of Technology, China
- Annelise Rosenfalck, FF (Deceased), Aalborg University, Denmark
- Christian Roux, '03, Télécom Bretagne, France
- Masao Saito, FF, Tokyo Denki University, Japan
- Niilo Saranummi, '00, VTT Technical Research Center, Finland
- Shunske Sato, '03, Osaka University, Japan
- Klaus Schindhelm, 'FF, University of New South Wales, Australia
- Geert W. Schmid-Schoenbe, '05, University of California San Diego, USA
- Leif Sornmo, '12, Lund University, Sweden
- Jos AE Spaan, '09, University of Amsterdam, Netherlands
- Kazuo Tanishita, '09, Keio University
- Nitish Thakor, '12, Johns Hopkins School of Medicine, USA
- Jie Tian, '12, Chinese Academy of Sciences, China
- Tatsuo Togawa, FF, Waseda University, Japan
- Shoogo Ueno, '06, University of Tokyo, Japan
- Max E. Valentinuzzi, FF, FE, University of Buenos Aires, Argentina
- Christopher L. 'Kit' Vaughan, '05, University of Cape Town, South Africa
- Karin Wardell, '12, Linkoping University, Sweden
- Peter Wells, FF, FE, Cardiff University, UK
- Andrzej Werynski, '03, Institute of Biocybernetics and Biomedical Engineering, Poland
- Nico Westerhof, FE, VU University, Netherlands
- Erich Wintermantel, '03, Swiss Federal Institute of Technology Zurich, Switzerland
- Jan Wojcicki, '12, Polish Academy of Sciences, Poland
- Bernhard Wolf, '12, Technische Universitaet Muenchen, Germany
- Zi Bin Yang, '02, Peking Union Medical College, China
- Yuan-Ting Zhang, '06, Chinese University of Hong Kong, Hong Kong
- FF stands for Founding Fellows
- FE stands for Fellow Emeritus
- The numbers beside the name indicate the year they were inducted
- Jianyi Jay Zhang, 2023, University of Alabama at Birmingham
