= James Ferrell =

James or Jim Ferrell may refer to:

- James Ferrell (biologist) (born 1955), American systems biologist
- James E. Ferrell, chairman of the board of directors of Ferrellgas
- T. James Ferrell (1939–2020), American engraver and medalist
- Jim Ferrell (James Allen Ferrell, born 1966), American lawyer and politician

== See also ==
- James Farrell (disambiguation)
