= James Farrell =

James, Jim or Jimmy Farrell may refer to:

- James Farrell (priest) (1803–1869), Irish cleric, first Dean of Adelaide
- James Farrell (1821—1891), Irish sculptor
- James A. Farrell (1863–1943), president of US Steel, 1911–1932
- James Augustine Farrell Jr. (1901–1966) his son, ship operator and owner
- James T. Farrell (1904–1979), American socialist novelist
- J. G. Farrell (James Gordon Farrell, 1935–1979), Anglo-Irish novelist
- James Farrell (television producer), British television executive
- Jimmy Farrell (James Leo Farrell, 1903–1979), Irish rugby player
- Jimmy Farrell (footballer) (1919–2007), Australian rules footballer
- J. P. Farrell (James Patrick Farrell, 1865–1921), Irish nationalist politician and Member of Parliament
- James Farrell (police officer) (c. 1830–?), New Zealand policeman
- James Esmond Farrell (1909–1968), New Zealand diplomat
- Jimmy Farrell, fictional character in the play The Playboy of the Western World
- Jim Farrell (born 1960), American politician in the state of Minnesota
