= St John Branigan =

New Zealand police commissioner (c.1824 – 1873)

St John Branigan (c.1824 – 11 September 1873) was a New Zealand police commissioner. He was born in King's County, Ireland on c.1824.

He was recruited from Victoria, Australia after being "highly recommended" by the government there to head the Otago Police in 1861, at the start of the Otago gold rush to control the "gold-generated turbulence" from an expected influx of miners from Victoria and elsewhere.

Later in the 1870s, he was also responsible to the general government for "demilitarising" the armed constabulary and turning it into a civilian police force, despite opposition from some provincial governments, including in Auckland.

== See also ==
- James Farrell (police officer)
