= Observation Point =

Point in Port Chalmers, New Zealand

Coordinates: 45°48′55″S 170°37′35″E

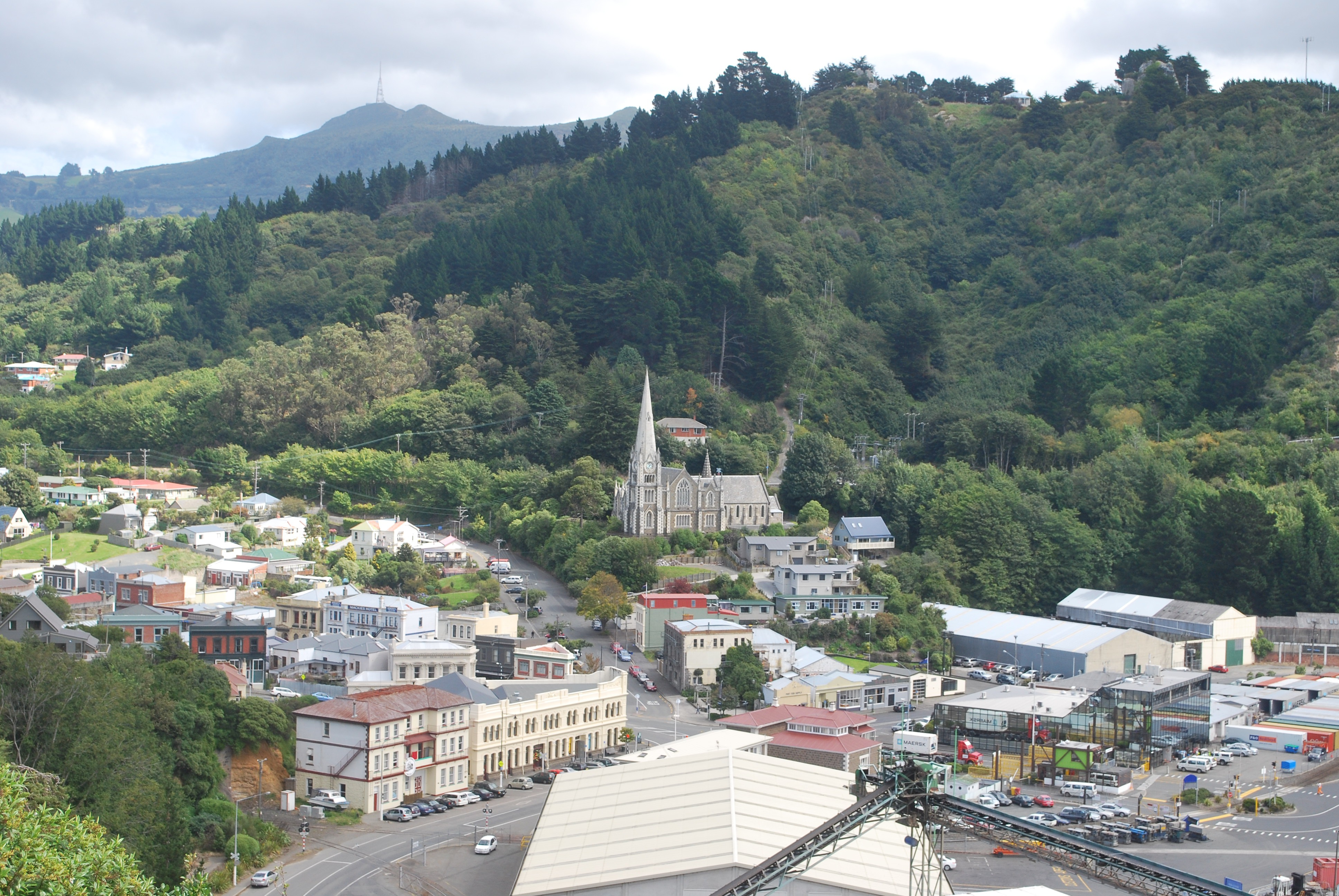
View across Port Chalmers from Observation Point

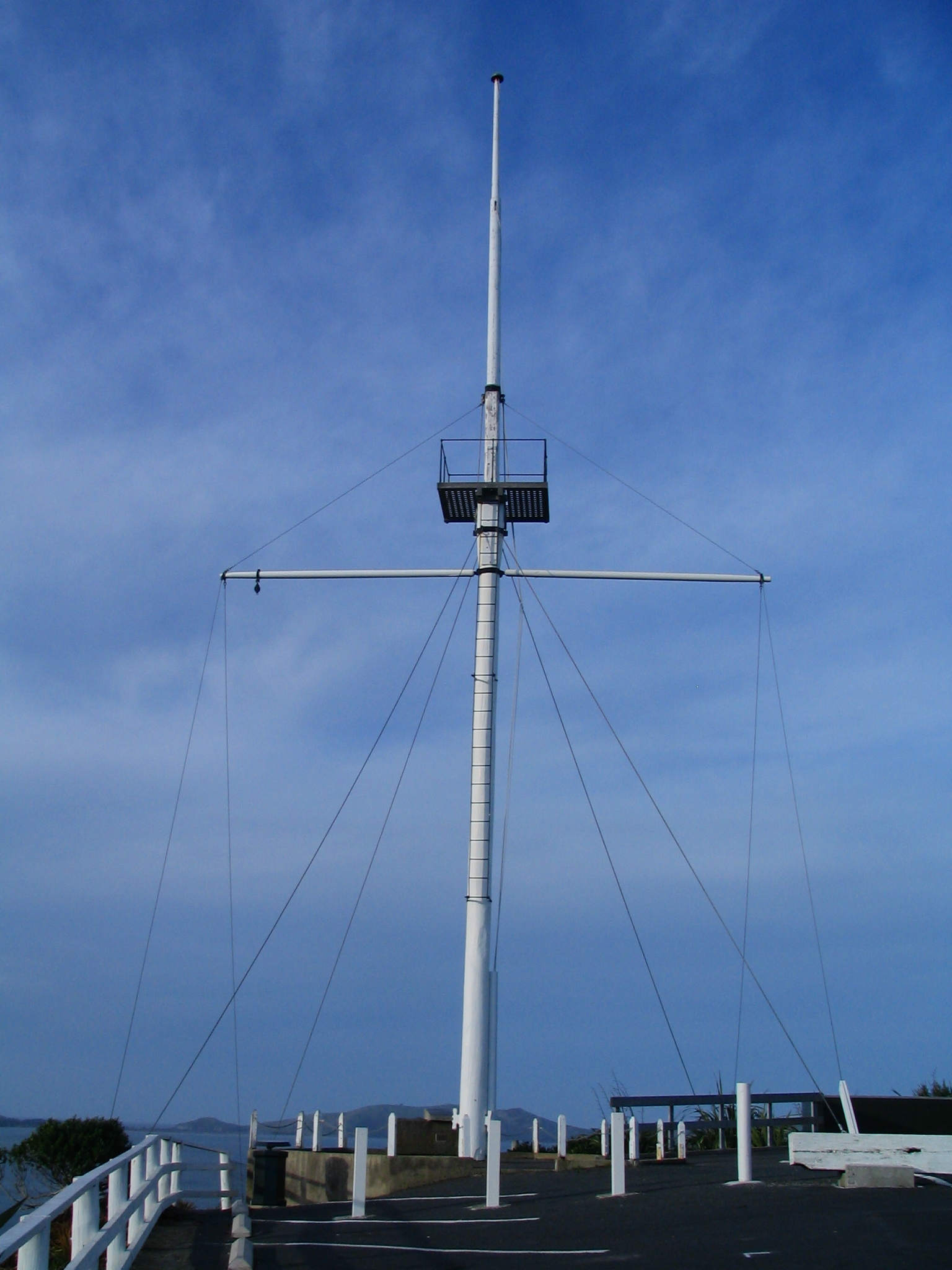
The Observation Point flagstaff

Observation Point, also known as Flagstaff Lookout or Flagstaff Hill, and formerly as Flagstaff Point is a large bluff in central Port Chalmers, in New Zealand's South Island. The point, as its name suggests, offers panoramic views covering the town, its deep-water port, and across the Otago Harbour. A road, Aurora Terrace, ascends to near the top of the point, allowing for easy public access.

In 1860 the crew of HMS Acheron used Observation Point to make the first detailed cartographical study of Otago Harbour in 1860. A plaque to this effect stands near the flagstaff.

In 1864 a flagstaff which had formerly been the mizzen mast on the condemned barque "Cincinnati" was installed on top of the point. The "Cincinnati" had once been owned by the notorious Bully Hayes. In June 1910 it was necessary to replace the original flagstaff (which had rotted) with a new “ironbark” flagstaff. In 1970 the flagstaff was restored and moved to a new location 50-100 yards (45.7 to 91.4 metres) closer to Port Chalmers, but still on Observation Point.

In June 1867 the Otago Provincial Council installed a time ball on the flagstaff. The service initially operated at 1 pm on all days of the week except Sundays. The service was discontinued in October 1877, but following concerns raised by 11 shipmasters the service resumed in April 1882 as a weekly service. In 1910 the time keeping service was discontinued but the ball however continued to be used until 1931 as a warning device. It was removed in 1970 but a replacement was restored to service in 2020.

When the port's facilities were expanded in 1993, the area contained the former studio of noted artist Ralph Hotere, was removed despite strenuous objection from many of the town's residents. Subsequently, an area accessed from Aurora Terrace close to the removed portion are converted in 2005 by the Hotere Foundation Trust with the assistance of the Otago Harbour Board into the Hotere Garden Oputae containing featuring works by both Hotere and by other noted New Zealand modern sculptors. The sculptures were previously displayed at Hotere's studio and include:

- Black Phoenix II by Ralph Hotere. It uses part of a fishing boat that burned in a yard in 1984.
- Brick Column by Russell Moses. It is made from a kiln once used by Coromandel potter Barry Brickell, while the iron bar is recycled from the port.
- They do cut down the poles that hold up the sky' by Shona Rapira Davies.
- Aramoana by Chris Booth. This was originally constructed in 1982 and decorated with more beach flotsam and jetsam. Aramoana, a beachside settlement south of Port Chalmers, was to be the site of an aluminum smelter – this piece was by way of a protest.

In 2008 Design and Garden Landscapes Ltd won the Landscape Industries Association of NZ premier award for the best use of native plants, a gold award for landscape horticulture and a silver award for the landscape design for their work on the garden.

In response to the demolition of Observation Point, Russell Moses in 1995 used the site clay to create large rosaries and paintings, as well as using woodchips from the wharf for bark paintings and sculptures.

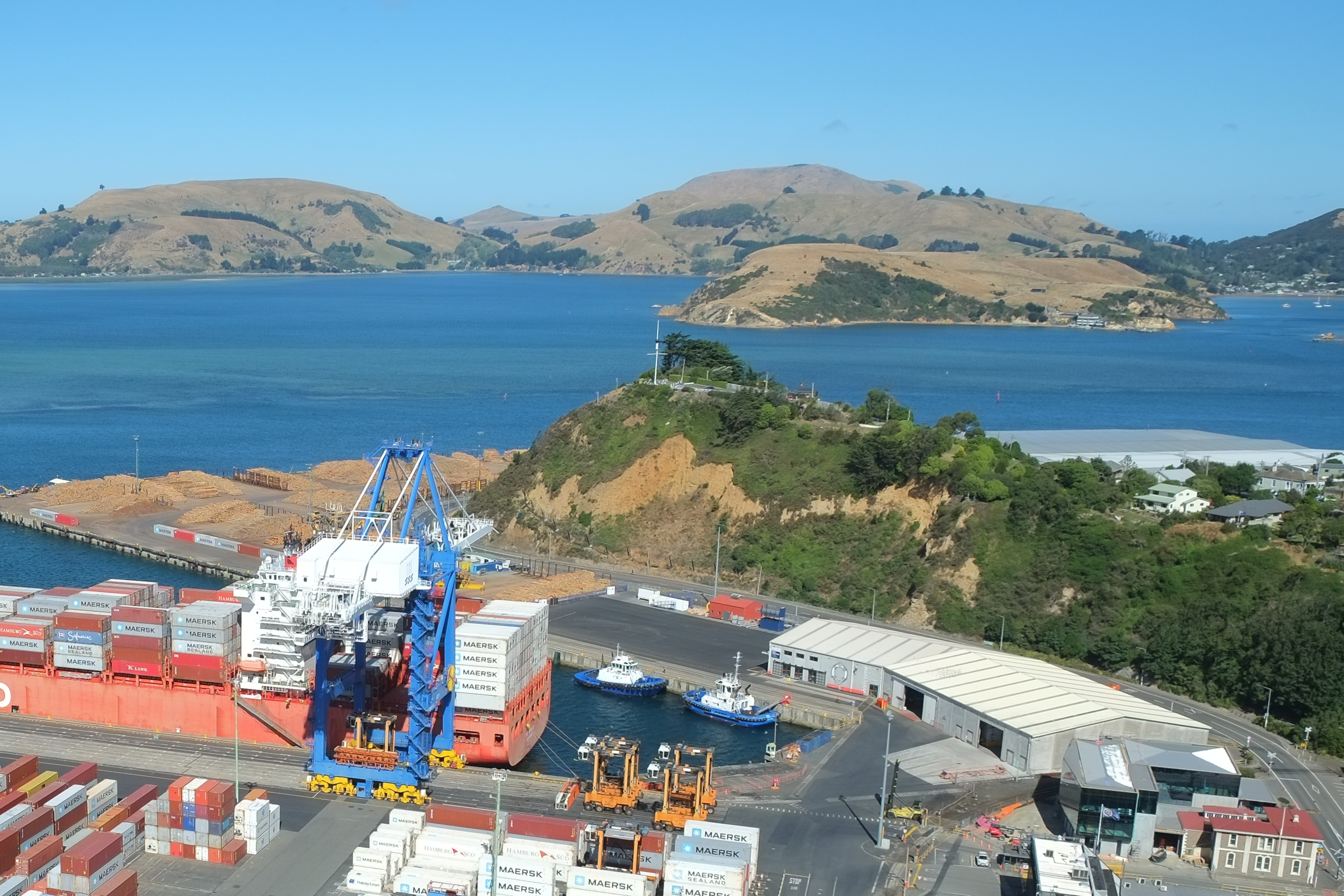
Observation Point behind Port Chalmers, with Otago Harbour in the background
