= Iona Church, Port Chalmers =

Church building in Port Chalmers, New Zealand

Iona Church
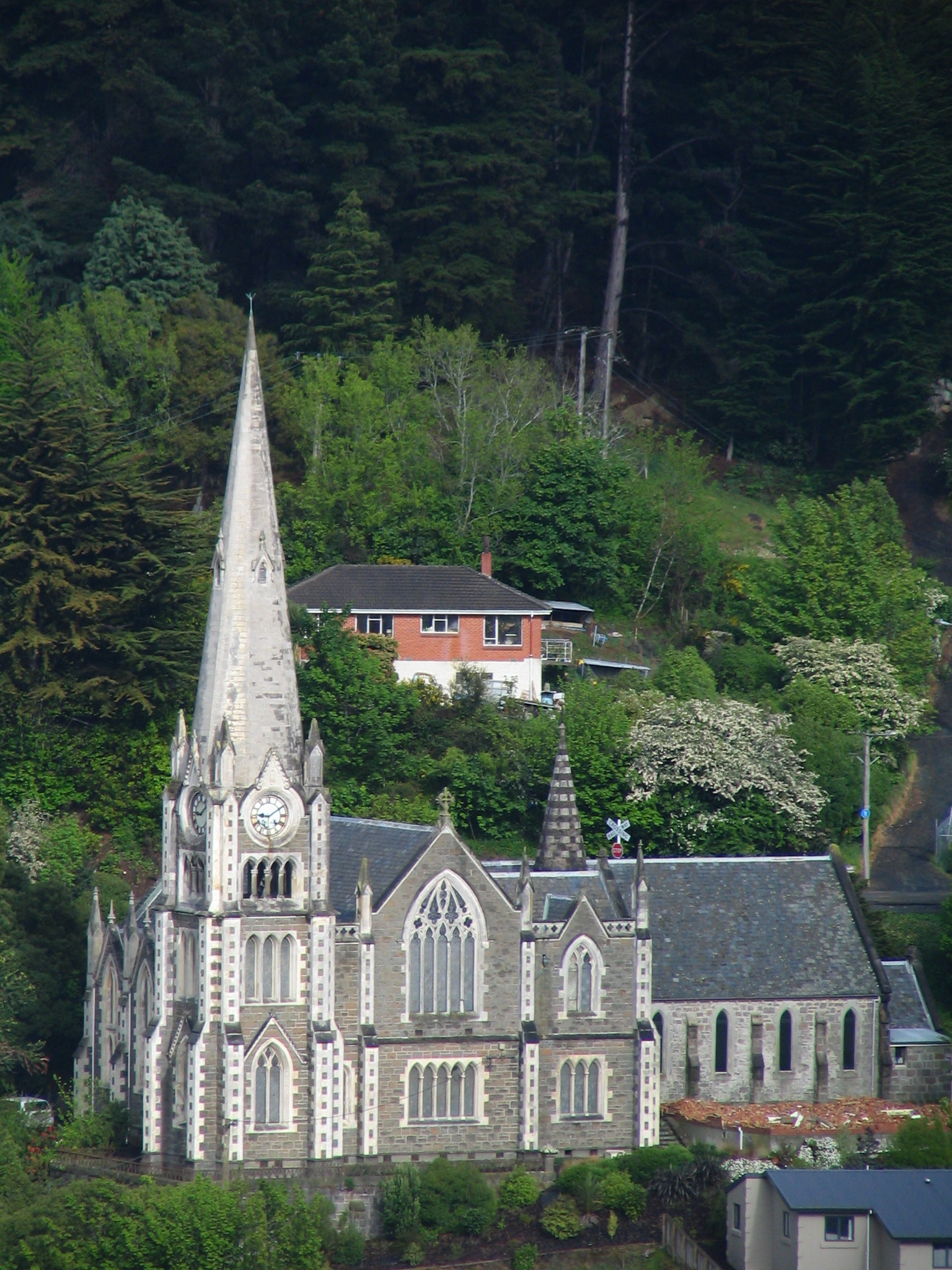
- Iona church (1872 building on the right and the 1882 addition on the left)
- Interactive map of the Iona Church area

General information
- Architectural style: Gothic Revival style
- Location: Port Chalmers, New Zealand
- Coordinates: 45.8149134°S 170.6205786°E
- Construction started: 1871
- Completed: 1872

Design and construction
- Architect: Nathaniel Wales

Renovating team
- Architects: Mason and Wales

Heritage New Zealand – Category 1
- Designated: 21 April 1994
- Reference no.: 7165

Iona Church is an historic church in Port Chalmers, New Zealand. The church building is listed as a Category I Historic Place.

== History ==
Iona church was designed to replace an earlier wooden church. The new stone church was designed by Nathaniel Wales. The foundation stone was laid in 1871 and the building was opened on 7 January 1872. As a result of a growing congregation an additional gallery was added between 1882 and 1883. The new gallery became the main church and the original church building became the church hall.

== Current use ==
Iona Church is open for special services, concerts and the summer cruise ship season.
