= Russell Moses =

New Zealand artist

- Born: 1948 (age 77–78); Palmerston North, New Zealand
- Occupation: Artist

Russell Moses (born 1948) is a New Zealand artist. He was born in 1948 in Palmerston North, New Zealand, Moses works in a variety of media including painting, printmaking, ceramic art, and sculpting. Moses is a self-taught artist who came to prominence in the 1970s with his large pit-fired ceramic sculpture installations. From 1971, he intermittently shared studio space with fellow New Zealand artist Ralph Hotere, who had built a studio at Observation Point, near Port Chalmers, in New Zealand's South Island. The studio was demolished in 1993 as part of efforts by the town's port facilities to expand. In response to the demolition of Observation Point, in 1995 Moses used the site clay to create large rosaries and paintings, as well as using woodchips from the wharf for bark paintings and sculptures.
