= James Farrell (police officer) =

New Zealand policeman

James Farrell (c. 1830 – after 1886) was a New Zealand policeman. Born in Ireland, he emigrated to Australia and later to New Zealand in the 1860s. He held a number of positions in the police force in New Zealand, including as the "second most senior policeman" in Wellington.

== Early career ==
Born in Ireland about 1830, according to his entry in the Dictionary of New Zealand Biography, Farrell was a member of the Royal Irish Constabulary for 12 years before he emigrated to Australia. He spent three years in the Victoria Police in Australia before moving to New Zealand in March 1863. In New Zealand, he initially held the position of detective in Port Chalmers. Farrell was a member of St John Branigan's police force around the time of the Otago gold rush.

== Shooting ==
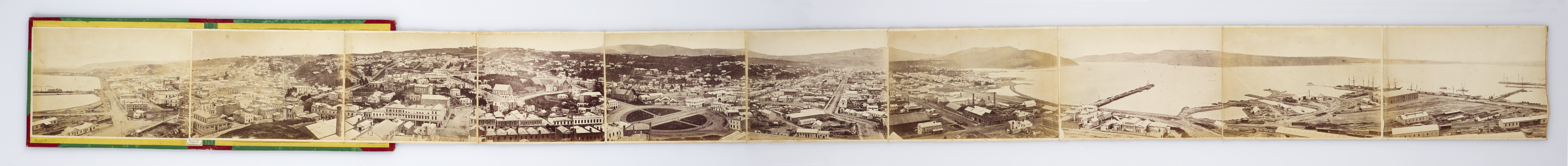
Dunedin in 1874

Shortly after Farrell moved to New Zealand, he married Bridget Megley. Megley had arrived in Dunedin in 1862 as an assisted female. In 1870, Farrell found that his wife and a friend of his, police sergeant Thomas Ryan, were having an affair. Ryan transferred out of Dunedin, only returning in 1872 after leaving the force. At just after 11pm on 4 January 1873 Farrell was shot in the arm. He alleged that Ryan was the shooter and was attempting to kill him. In the resulting trial, which attracted "enormous publicity", Ryan was acquitted. Other than Farrell, no one else saw the person who fired the shots. Two witnesses had also placed Ryan at another place at the time of the shooting. Farrell subsequently started to "behave erratically", arresting Ryan on a firearms charge. Demoted to sergeant, Farrell was transferred to Lawrence. He was eventually discharged from the force in Otago by 1875 as his behaviour continued to deteriorate.

== Later life ==
Despite knowing of Farrell's background, Inspector Frederick Atchison appointed him as a detective in the Wellington provincial police later in 1875. Farrell went on to become Wellington's "second most senior policeman". Atchison and Farrell fell out by 1878, with both appearing before the Gaols Committee of the House of Representatives accusing each other of various serious misdemeanors. As a result, Farrell was transferred to Thames as a detective.

Farrell only lasted at Thames until June 1882, when he was forced to resign because of an assault by him on a bushman, William Fraser. A petition was presented to Parliament by Thames residents seeking his reappointment. The Public Petitions Committee of Parliament, after considering the petition, recommended that if he could not be reappointed to the police force that he be offered a public service appointment. The recommendations were unsuccessful, and Farrell moved to Fiji where he was a member of the police service until at least 1883.

In 1886 the Grey River Argus reported Farrell as having returned to Wellington and suggested sarcastically that the Premier would take care of Dowb(Farrell).
