= Port Chalmers time ball =

Time ball in Port Chalmers, New Zealand

Coordinates: 45.81573°S 170.62675°E

The Port Chalmers time ball is a Victorian maritime Greenwich Mean Time signal located on Aurora Terrace on top of Observation Point in the port of Port Chalmers, New Zealand. It was established in 1867 by the Otago Provincial Council. The time ball fell precisely at 1 p.m. daily. Originally triggered by a grandfather clock, from 1882 onwards a telegraph signal from Wellington took over this function. It was removed in 1970, but a replacement was restored to service in 2020.

== History ==
Following the introduction of New Zealand's first time ball, established at Wellington in March 1864, proposals were put forward for the introduction of a similar time signalling device at Port Chalmers. Originally it was suggested by harbourmaster W. Thomson that a time gun be used in preference to a time ball, as at noon, ship masters are frequently on shore, and were more likely to hear a gun than observe a time ball. The gun would also indicate the time to the inhabitants of the town, many of whom were not within sight of the signal station, and to the harbour ferry masters. It was not until 1867, following pressure from shipowners, that the Otago Provincial Council decided to install a time ball on the existing flagstaff on top of Observation Point. The flagstaff which was installed in 1864 had formerly been the mizzen mast on the condemned barque "Cincinnati". This ship had once been owned by the notorious Bully Hayes.

Active preparations are being made for the working of the long needed time ball at the Flagstaff, Port Chalmers. A conductor has been laid from the Observatory to the Flagstaff, which being attached to the haulyards by a simple arrangement, the ball is dropped instantaneously by the signal master. The whole of the arrangements are expected to be completed in a week, when the great want of a time ball to the shipping community will be numbered with the things of the past.

— Otago Daily Times, 30 March 1867

It was the first publicly funded time ball in New Zealand.

The service started on Saturday 1 June 1867 with the ball being dropped daily, except Sundays, at 1 p.m. Port Chalmers time, that is, 1 hour 37 minutes 23.5 seconds a.m. Greenwich Mean Time. Despite the introduction of New Zealand mean time in 1868 the stated drop time continued to be 1 p.m. Port Chalmers mean time. The exact time was kept by a grandfather clock which was checked every day at 9 a.m. when a signal was telegraphed from Wellington to the signal master.

At 12.45 p.m. the time ball was hoisted on the flagstaff, while officers on the ships would stand by their chronometers and an apprentice would be outside watching the time ball. At 1 pm the signal master would drop the ball and the apprentice would shout "Stop". The officers would then check their chronometers (and no doubt local residents also checked their clocks and watches). The time was recorded when the ball began descending, not when it reached the bottom.

Regular notices such as the following appeared in the local newspapers to announce the operation of the time ball:

PORT CHALMERS OBSERVATORY.
Latitude, 45.48.55 south; longitude, 11 h. 22m. 36 sec. east.
Time ball drops daily (Sundays excepted), at 1 p.m., Port Chalmers mean time, or 1 h. 37m. 23secs. a.m. Greenwich mean time.

— Otago Daily Times, 19 June 1867

The service was discontinued in October 1877, but following a petition to the Otago Harbour Board from 11 shipmasters in January 1881 it was decided in March 1881 to reinstate it as a weekly service.

The service resumed in April 1882, with the time received by a signal via the telegraph line from the Wellington Telegraph Office. The time ball was dropped at the instant the current moved the needle of a galvanometer. The time given was mean time at longitude 11h 30min 00.3 sec east. Prior to the ball being dropped a blue flag was hoisted on the signal staff at about 10 a.m. The Otago Harbour Board took over operation of the time ball station in 1885 and service was dropped to twice a week. In June 1910 it was necessary to replace the original flagstaff (which had rotted) with a new ironbark flagstaff. By that same year the time ball had fallen into disrepair, and as fewer vessels were visiting port the need for its service was waning, so its original function was discontinued.

The ball continued to be used until 1931 to warn local fishermen of high seas off Taiaroa Head and of shipping coming down the Upper Otago Harbour from Dunedin. It remained hung from the yardarm on the flagstaff for many years, but was removed in 1970 when the flagstaff was restored and moved to a new location 50-100 yards closer to Port Chalmers, but still on Observation Point.

== Reinstatement ==
In 2019 the Port Chalmers Historical Society agreed to support a proposal by a small group of its members to reinstate a time ball on the existing flagstaff. This group consisting of Garry Bain, Warner Gardiner, Norman Ledgerwood, and Harold Woods, raised $50,000 to install a replacement time ball.

The new 120 kg time ball made from marine-grade stainless steel and its operating mechanism were designed, manufactured, and installed by Stark Bros Ltd of Lyttelton. The time ball was installed in August 2020. Since it was officially opened on 3 October 2020 the time ball has operated daily at 1 pm seven days a week.

The flagstaff is designated as a Category 2 Historic Place by Heritage New Zealand.

The original clock that operated the time ball is housed in the collection of the Toitū Otago Settlers Museum in Dunedin. The only other operational time ball in New Zealand is at Lyttelton.

== See also ==
- Time signal
