= Port Chalmers Post Office =

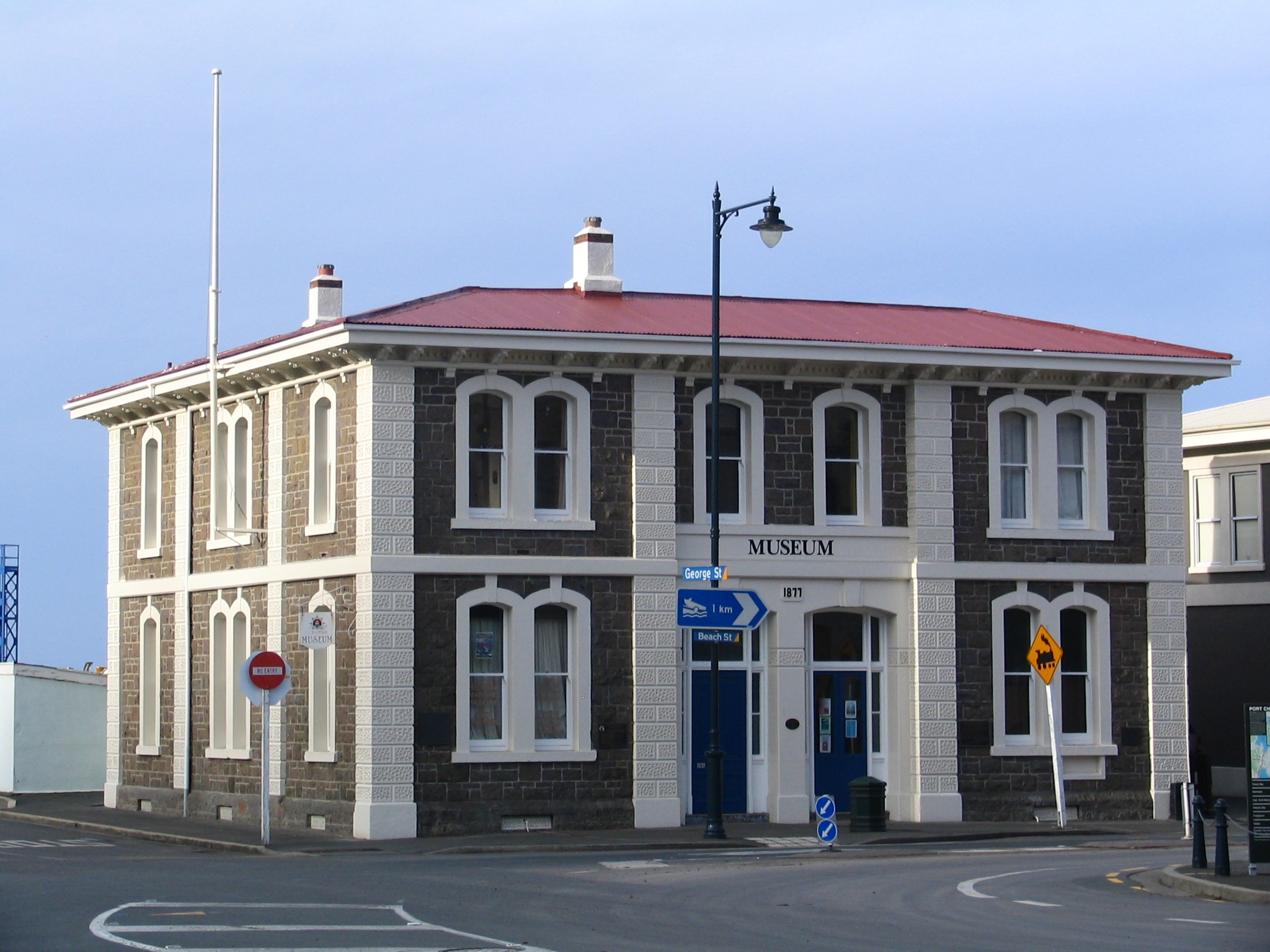

General information
- Type: Post office
- Architectural style: Renaissance Revival
- Location: Port Chalmers, New Zealand, 19 Beach Street
- Coordinates: 45.8150°S 170.6228°E
- Current tenants: Port Chalmers Historical Society (Port Chalmers Maritime Museum)
- Year built: 1876–1877
- Owner: Port Otago

Heritage New Zealand – Category 1
- Designated: 24 November 1983
- Reference no.: 359

Port Chalmers Post Office is a Renaissance revival former post office in the town of Port Chalmers. Designed by Colonial Architect William Clayton the Port Chalmers Post Office served the town for over a century before later being converted into a museum. The post office is registered as a category 1 building with Heritage New Zealand. The Port Chalmers Maritime Museum houses many items relating to the history of Port Chalmers as well as the general maritime history of New Zealand.

== Description ==
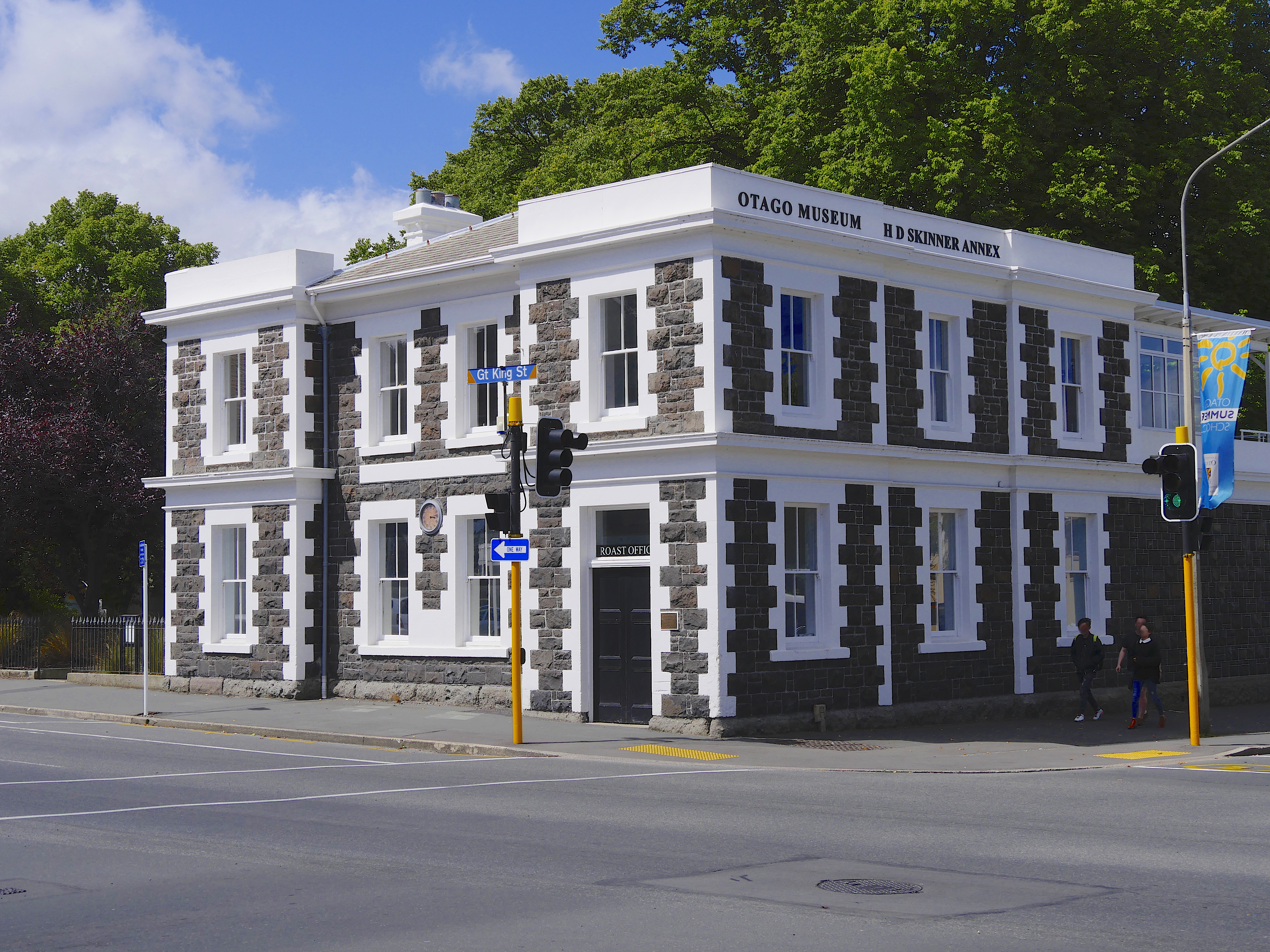
The Port Chalmers Post Office was designed to resemble the Dunedin North Post Office (above), emphasising the links between the two settlements.

Situated on reclaimed land at the corner of Beach and George Streets, Port Chalmers Post Office is an L-shaped Renaissance revival two-storey building constructed from local breccia. Quoins are used to decorate the building alongside double-hung sash windows surmounted by an architrave. The building has ornate detailing with modillions, pilasters, cornices, and dentil bands. The design of the building is reminiscent of the Dunedin North Post Office, with this being done to emphasise links between the two settlements.

The interior features rimu and kauri mock panelling and a mezzanine floor.

The building has three plaques: one that commemorates Merchant Navy seamen who died during the Second World War, one acknowledges the role of Port Chalmers in the Second Boer War, and the other by the Waterfront Workers Union.

== History ==
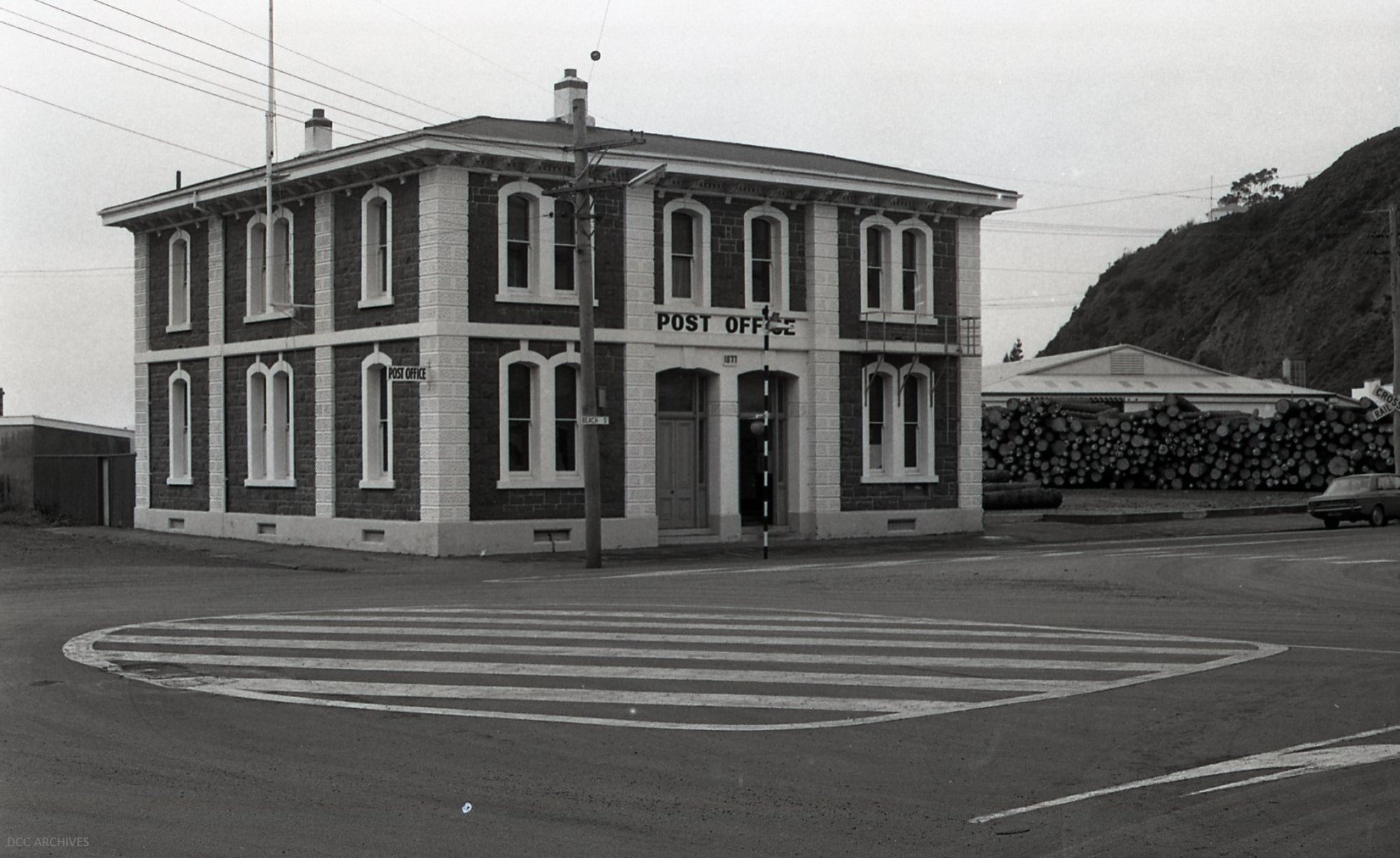
The post office c.1975

The main post office for the wider area was initially established at Otakou in April 1848 but in July it was decided to move the post office to Port Chalmers. The post office was moved into a George Street store in 1860 but in the following year it had moved to a timber building on Beach Street. By 1876 there was a strong desire for a new building as the timber building was located below the road level leading to the smells from the drains impacting the post office — one reporter for the Otago Daily Times referred to the building as 'disgrace to the town'. The government decided to construct a dedicated post office for the town and Colonial Architect William Clayton designed a Renaissance stone building. (Note: The original 1983 heritage report on the post office states it was probably the work of Chief Draughtsman Pierre Burrows)

Construction began in late 1876 with Mr Bauchop being the contractor. When the foundations were being laid water was struck and concrete was used instead. Construction was finished in November 1877. F. G. Downes occupied the upper storey as post master until his death in 1892. Downes' replacement, G. W. Sampson, managed the post office until 1897. Sampson's successor William Bundle remained as post master until his death in 1900.

In June 1910 a lean-to and scullery was added onto the post office for the postmaster as part of a renovation.

== Port Chalmers Maritime Museum ==
The Port Chalmers Historical Society was initially established as the Port Chalmers Old Identities' Association and focused on recording the history of pioneers of the settlement. In 1987 the museum moved to the Port Chalmers Post Office from the Port Chalmers Pioneer Hall. Since then the Port Chalmers Historical Society manage the post office as a museum. The museum was initially just focused on the history of Port Chalmers but over time expanded to cover the maritime history of the whole country. The collection includes tens of thousands of artefacts and a similar number of photographs. The main gallery focuses on the maritime history of both the port and New Zealand. The main gallery contains a significant number of items relating to the Union Steam Ship Company, formerly one of the principal employers at the port, This room is themed after the colours of the company. Attached to it is the Pioneer Room, which contains more general exhibits relating to the history of Port Chalmers. The museum is notable for its collection of artefacts relating to early Antarctic exploration. Antarctic explorers Robert Falcon Scott and Richard E. Byrd visited Port Chalmers as part of their antarctic expeditions. Other items housed at the museum include a collection ships in bottles dating to the 18th-century. The museum atrium has a 'wall of ships', where model ships are displayed.

In 2020 Port Otago purchased the building for $1 in exchange for paying for the management of the maritime museum. The lean-to, scullery, and balcony; several 20th-century outbuildings; a modern building and a modern extension to the post office were demolished as part of the development of a new headquarters for Port Otago.
