= Port Chalmers =

Main seaport of Dunedin, New Zealand

Port Chalmers Māori: Kōpūtai
- Settlement
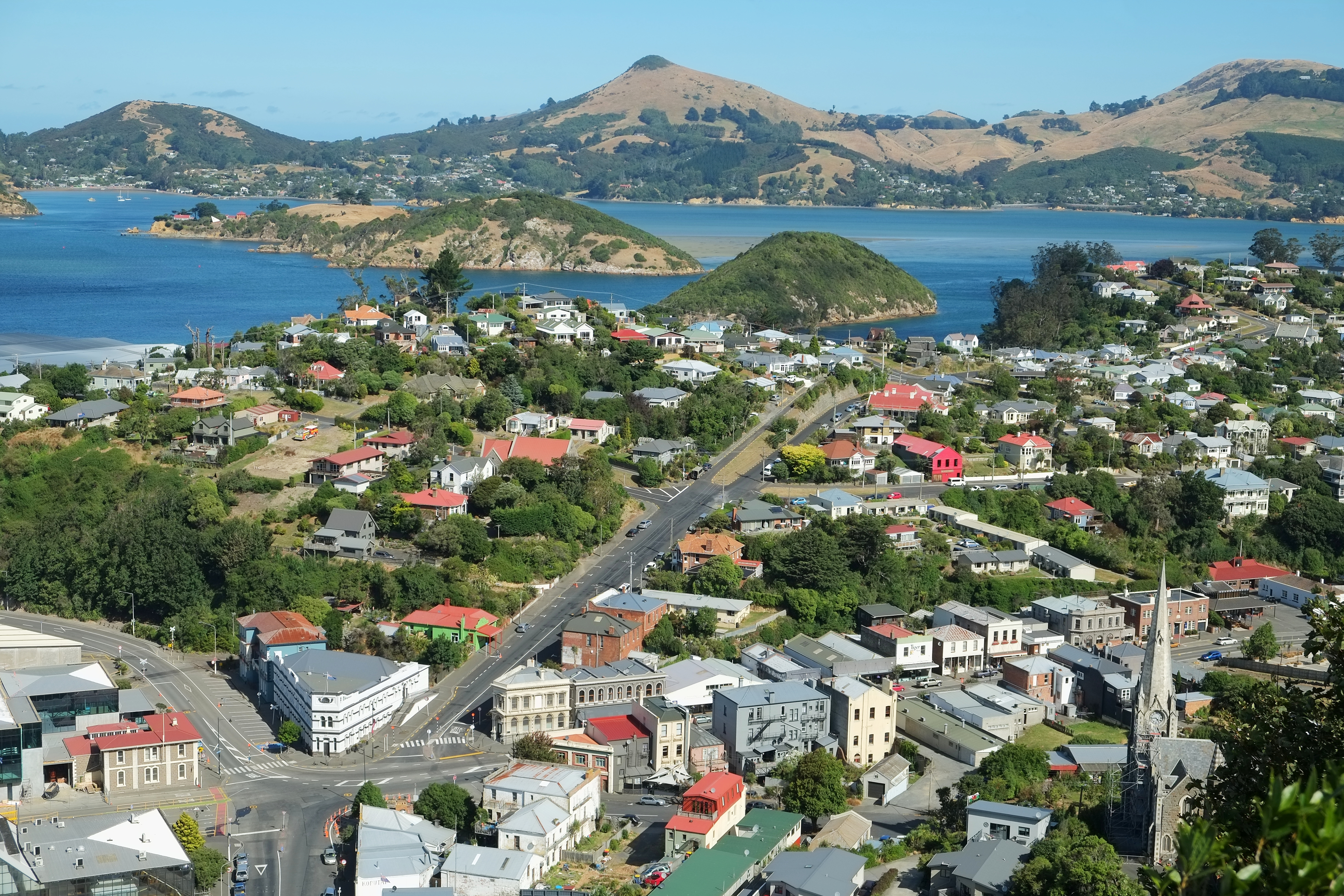
- Looking across Port Chalmers and the Otago Harbour to the Otago Peninsula
- Interactive map of Port Chalmers
- Coordinates: 45.8178°S 170.6188°E
- Country: New Zealand
- Island: South Island
- Region: Otago
- Territorial authority: Dunedin
- Community board: West Harbour Community Board
- Electorates: Dunedin; Te Tai Tonga (Māori)

Government
  - Territorial authority: Dunedin City Council
  - Regional council: Otago Regional Council
  - Mayor of Dunedin: Sophie Barker
  - Dunedin MP: Rachel Brooking
  - Te Tai Tonga MP: Mananui Ramsden

Area
  - Total: 3.24 km^{2} (1.25 sq mi)

Population (June 2025)
  - Total: 1,400
  - Density: 430/km^{2} (1,100/sq mi)
- Time zone: UTC+12 (NZST)
  - Summer (DST): UTC+13 (NZDT)
- Area code: 03
- Local iwi: Ngāi Tahu

Port Chalmers (Māori: Kōpūtai) is a town serving as the main port of the city of Dunedin, New Zealand. Port Chalmers lies 13 kilometres (8.1 mi) inside Otago Harbour, some 13 kilometres (8.1 mi) northeast of Dunedin's city centre.

== Name ==
Kōpūtai refers to the bay itself, and means 'full tide' (tai = tide). One story tells that a group of warriors spent the night in a cave at what was later known as Boiler Point, and pulled their canoes well above the high tide mark. Overnight, the tide rose and the beached canoes were set adrift. Some of the group swam out to reclaim the canoes while those onshore cried out "Koputai!, Koputai!"

European settlers initially planned to rename the settlement 'New Leith' or 'New Musselburgh', as they disliked the Māori name of Kōpūtai; but the Lay Association of the Free Church of Scotland (later known as the Otago Association), suggested that the port might be named after Thomas Chalmers (leader of the Free Church movement in Scotland).

== History ==
=== Early Māori settlement ===
The last known hapū at Kōpūtai was led by a chief called Kohi. The story goes that Kohi fell ill and worried that his young son Timoko would never have any benefit from a sealing boat in which he had a share. He therefore instructed his servants, Kurukuru and Rau-o-te-uri, to burn the boat where it lay on the beach at Kōpūtai. The other partners in the boat were outraged, so, after consulting his wife Piro, Kohi consented at Otaheiti to be strangled as punishment. Taiaroa, his cousin, was given the task but upon observing his hand trembling as he was tying the knot Kohi exclaimed: "Kahore kia mataa a Taiaroa ki te mea o te taura" (Taiaroa does not know how to tie a knot). Kohi then took the rope, tied a slip-knot, and adjusted the rope about his own neck before Taiaroa pulled upon the rope tight, until he was dead. Kohi was buried at Kōpūtai. By 1844, Kōpūtai was deserted.

No archaeological sites relating to Māori have been discovered in Port Chalmers, although records from European settlers in the 1830s and 1840s note the presence of buildings on the now-reclaimed beach. By 1844 this settlement was fully abandoned.

=== Arrival of the Europeans ===
Captain James Herd visited the Otago Harbour in 1826. By the 1830s Kōpūtai Bay was a whaling station in use by America, British, and French vessels.

The first Christian service at Kōpūtai was held by the Reverend James Watkin, the Wesleyan missionary at Waikouaiti, in 1842.

In 1844, the schooner Deborah, under the command of Captain Thomas Wing, was chartered by Frederick Tuckett of the New Zealand Company to assist him in choosing a site for the planned New Edinburgh settlement. Tuckett explored the harbour and its environs, as well as the inland country. The Deborah anchored near Kōpūtai in the bay now called Deborah Bay, where the ship's hull remains. By 11 June 1944 Kōpūtai had a makeshift jetty, two whare (Māori-style houses) and some tents. Tuckett built a brick home there in 1844, distinctive among the primarily wattle-and-daub buildings that made up the settlement until the Otago gold rush.

The sale of the Otago Block from the Māori to the Otago Association was concluded at Kōpūtai on 31 July 1844. In December 1844, Tuckett left and returned to England, with William Davidson taking over his cottage and position as the New Zealand Company's local representative. In that same month, Janet and Alexander McKay arrived with plans to establish a public house. It eventually opened as the 'Surveyors' Arms' on what is now Beach Street and was licensed by the Akaroa-based magistrate John Watson in 1846. On 23 February 1846, the ship Mary Catherine anchored at Kōpūtai. On board was Charles Kettle, surveyor to the New Zealand Company, with his wife and a staff of six assistant surveyors and 25 labourers, whose task was to survey the land that had been purchased from the Māori. Kettle and his wife took up residence in Tuckett's cottage. The survey of the town was completed in May 1846.

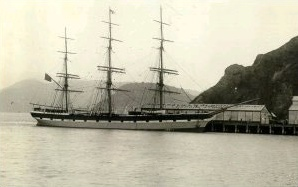
Euterpe (later Star of India) at Port Chalmers in 1883

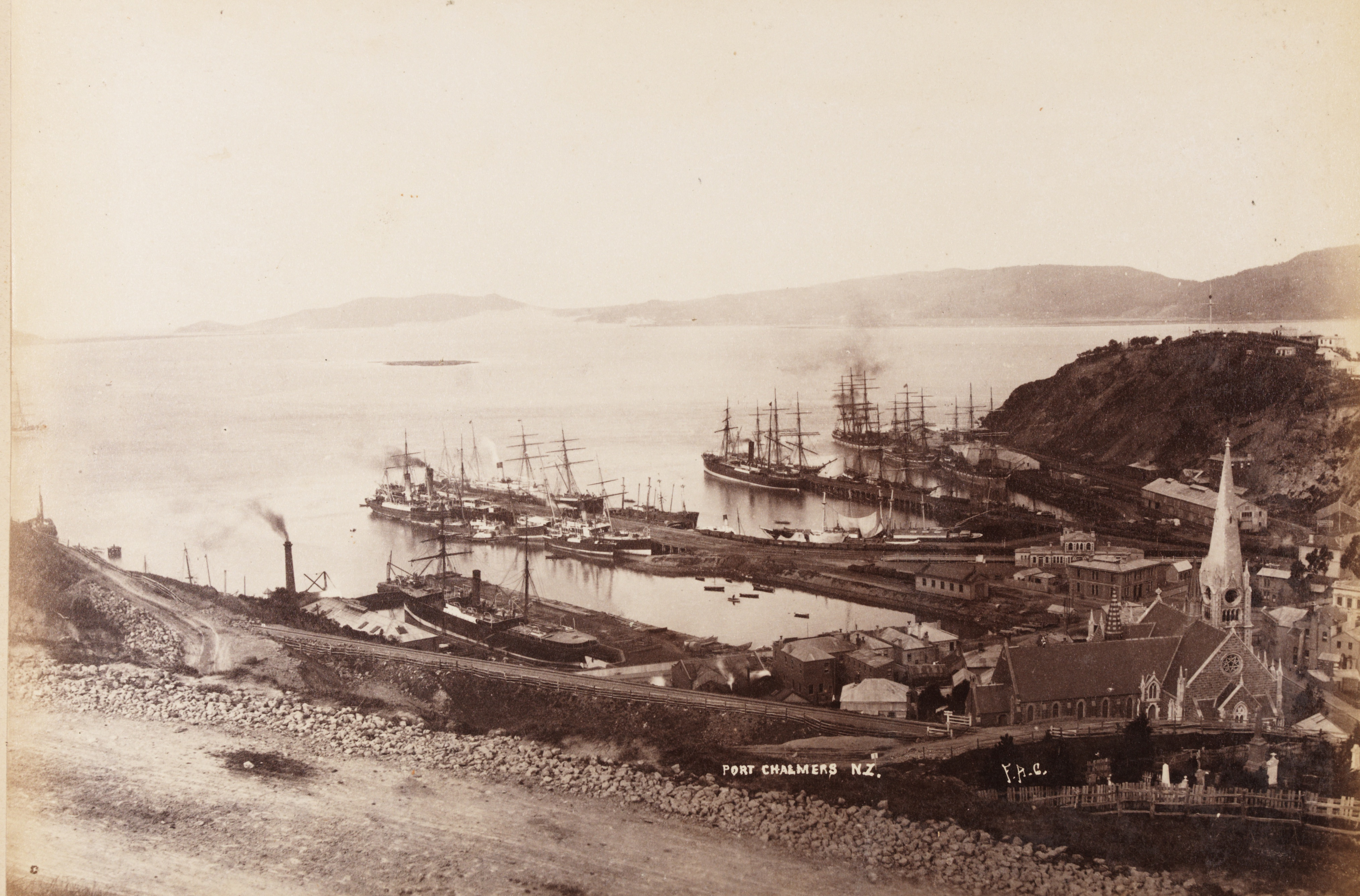
Port Chalmers, New Zealand, c. 1895

The first organised European settlers arrived in Otago Harbour on the John Wickliffe, which moored off Port Chalmers on 23 March 1848. The Philip Laing arrived on 15 April 1848 to find a settlement surrounded by dense bush. It consisted of the New Zealand Company's store, Tuckett's former cottage and three whare. Port Chalmers had 400 potential sections available compared with Dunedin's 2,000. By 1849, the population had reached 38, which rose to 80 by 1854, and around 130 by 1861.

=== Origins of Port Chalmers ===
Disagreement arose over where the main Otago port should be but eventually Port Chalmers superseded Ōtākou as the main Otago port. The Bowen pier was built in 1873, followed by the Export pier, and, later, the George Street pier.

In 1854, the 220 ton Nelson was the first steamer to visit Port Chalmers, as the Otago harbour was too shallow for large ships to reach Dunedin. Ships initially used to anchor in the stream, and the cargo was transferred to lighters, which were towed by tugs to Dunedin at the head of the harbour. There was also a steep road connection from North East Valley to Sawyers Bay, a spur of the main road north.

By the 1860s, a road along the side of the harbour between Dunedin and Port Chalmers had been built, which allowed ships to dock at Port Chalmers and their goods then transported to and from Dunedin by road. In 1862, Dunedin and Port Chalmers were connected by a telegraph line.

The Otago gold rush, which started in 1861, saw 16,000 new arrivals pass through the port in three months. This transformed Port Chalmers as businesses sprung up to service both the increasing number of ships and their passengers. Despite the development, the streets were still unpaved and muddy following any heavy rain. By 1864, Port Chalmers had grown to be the third largest port in Australasia, with a population of at least 1,000; five hotels, three restaurants, six general stores, two chemists, two bakeries, two barbers, two blacksmiths, two churches, two schools, and a Masonic Hall (which functioned during the week as a courthouse).

Between the 1860s and 1870s the bay was reclaimed to provide land for expansion of the port and a railway between Port Chalmers and Dunedin.

On 18 June 1865, a large fire consumed an entire block at the corner of George and Grey Streets, destroying a number of buildings. The fire was put out by local citizens and the Naval Brigade. A volunteer fire brigade was not organised until 1876.

In 1881 the Victoria Ship Channel was dredged along the north-western side of the harbour, to allow ocean-going ships to reach the city's wharves.

New Zealand's refrigerated meat trade began when the ship Dunedin left Port Chalmers with the first such cargo, in 1882.

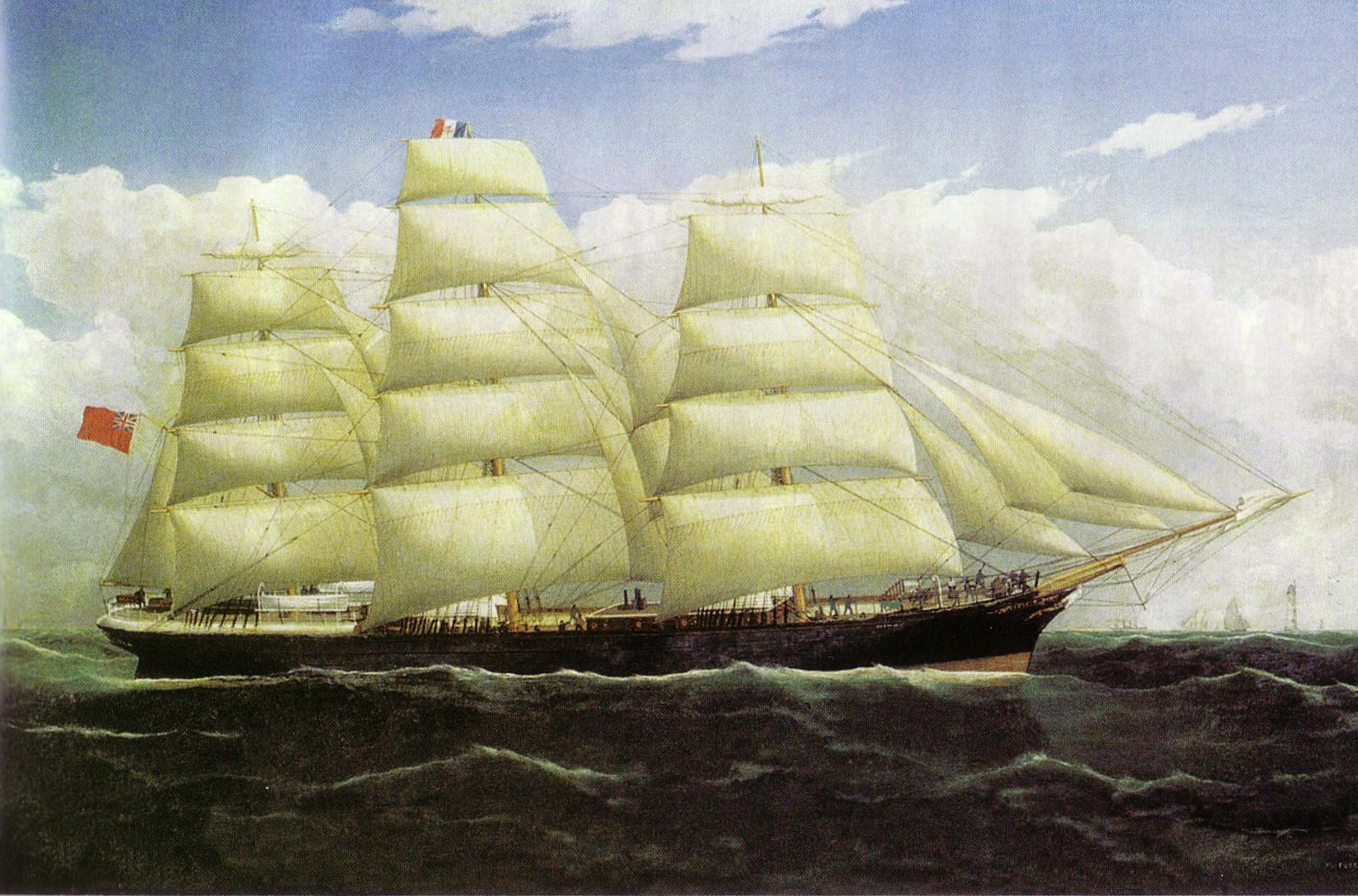
Dunedin by Frederick Tudgay, the first commercially successful refrigerated ship.

=== Railway connection ===
In the early 1870s, construction began on the Port Chalmers Branch railway line linking Dunedin and Port Chalmers. The line went through a cutting and a tunnel before terminating at a new wharf. Soil excavated from the tunnel was used for the reclamation of land for this wharf. When the railway line opened on 1 January 1873, it was the first 1,067 mm narrow gauge railway in New Zealand. After the line opened, the lighters service between Port Chalmers and Dunedin stopped.

The branch line was incorporated into the national rail network through a connection at Sawyers Bay to the Main South Line, which was opened through to Christchurch on 7 September 1878 and Invercargill on 22 January 1879. A railway station called the "Upper Station" was built to service passengers where the Main South Line went along the hill above the port; the branch terminus on the wharf continued to service freight and was known as the "Lower Station".

The first dedicated ferry service was introduced on the harbour in 1859, but it was not profitable. As the region's growth rapidly increased during the Gold Rush, scheduled ferry services ran between Port Chalmers and Portobello from 1876 to 1954.

=== Servicing Antarctic exploration ===
In November 1894, the port was host to the Antarctic, a Norwegian whaling and sealing ship soon to be credited with the first substantiated landing on the Antarctic continent. While docked in Port Chalmers for repairs and restocking, several of her crew refused to continue with the voyage, and four New Zealanders were recruited several days later at Stewart Island. During the heroic era of Antarctic exploration, the Otago Harbour Board sought to attract subsequent explorers, extending generous hospitality by way of coal, food, and complimentary use of the harbour facilities. This dangled carrot drew Robert Falcon Scott, who visited with both the Discovery in December 1901 and his final doomed Terra Nova expedition to Antarctica in November 1910. It attracted Ernest Shackleton's Nimrod and Endurance expeditions. In 1916, Shackleton's damaged ship, the Aurora, was towed to Port Chalmers, repaired in Port and then returned to Antarctica. American Richard E. Byrd used Port Chalmers as the base for his Antarctic operations in 1928, Lincoln Ellsworth did likewise in 1933, and so did a number of other American, French and New Zealand explorers over the coming decades.

=== 1900s ===
In 1903, the temperance movement was successful in prohibiting the selling of alcohol in the Port Chalmers electorate. Hotels in the town banded together, taking their case as far as the Privy Council in London, before winning back their licences in May 1905.

By 1905, the town had a population of over 2,000 and was home to two railway stations, two banks, a dairy factory, gas works, two cemeteries, a recreation reserve, two fire stations, a brass band, salt water bath, and a Mechanics' Institute. The town was protected by a company of the Permanent Artillery and the Garrison Artillery Volunteers.

A road tunnel linking Sawyers Bay with Waitati as part of a new north motorway from Dunedin was proposed in the 1930s, but never built. A new faster, harbourside road from the city was completed in 1965.

By 1961, the population had grown to 3,120.

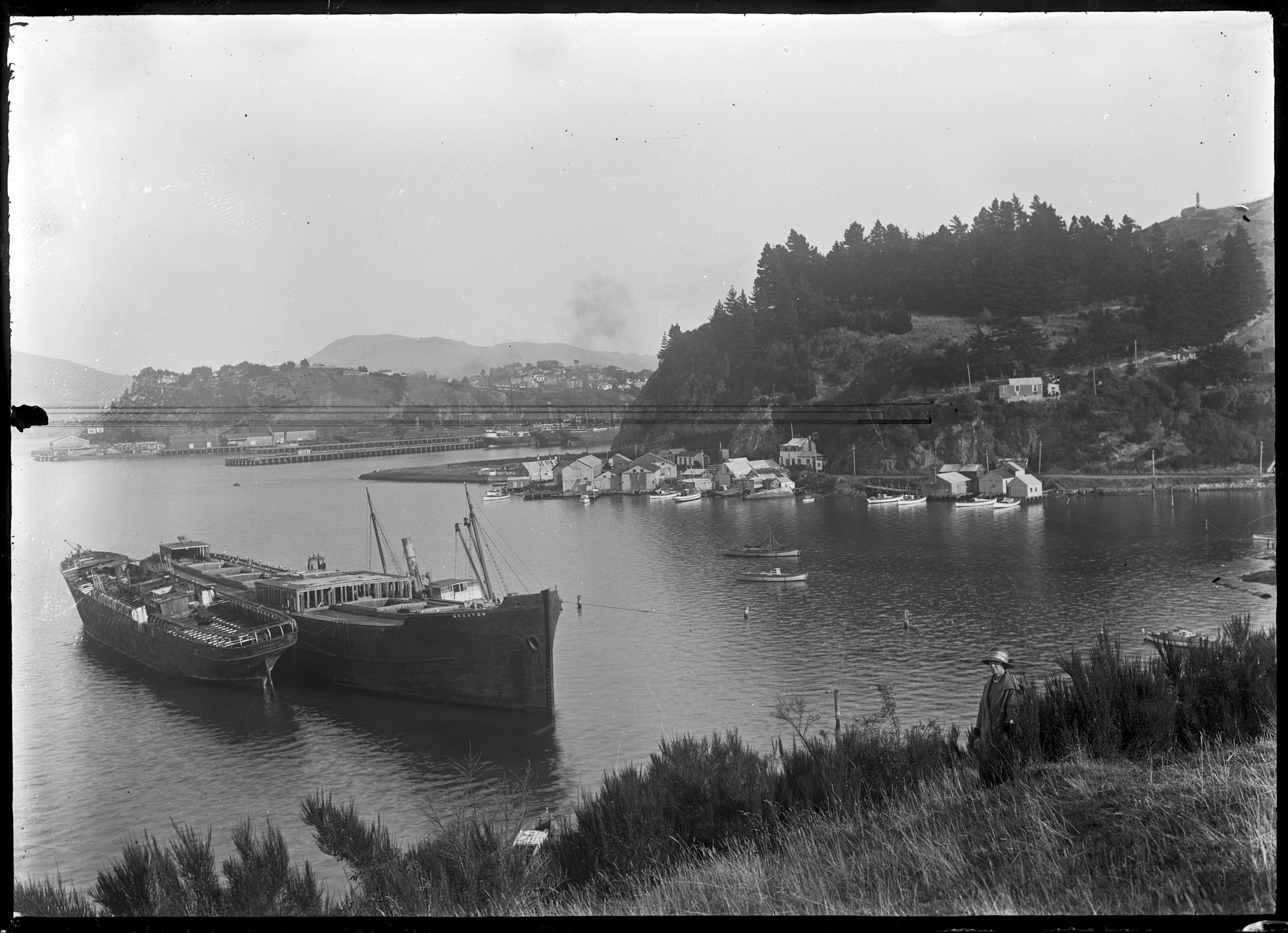
View across Carey's Bay at Port Chalmers in 1926

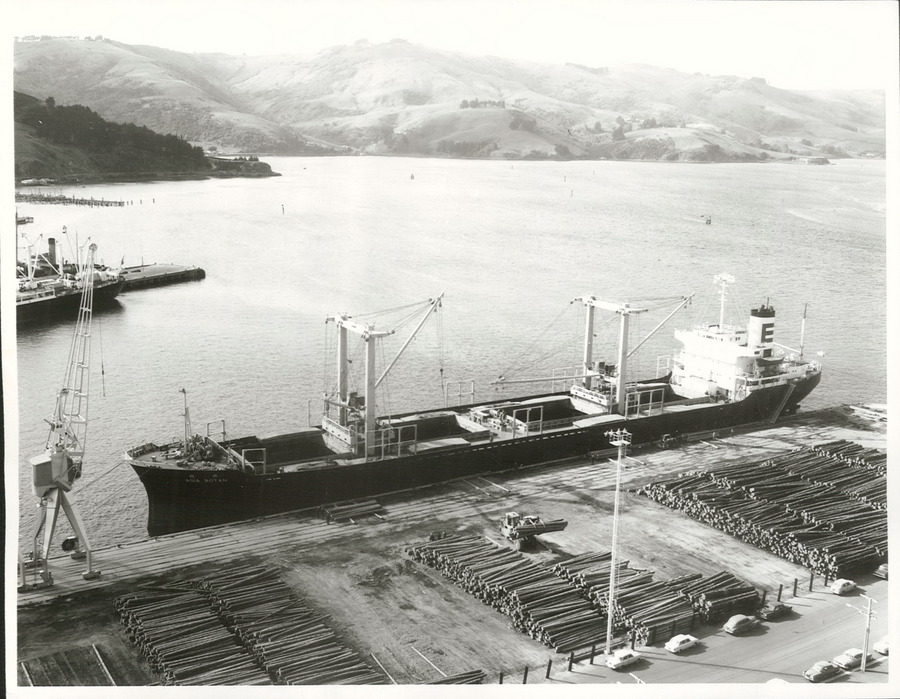
Loading at the new logging wharf, Port Chalmers (1972)

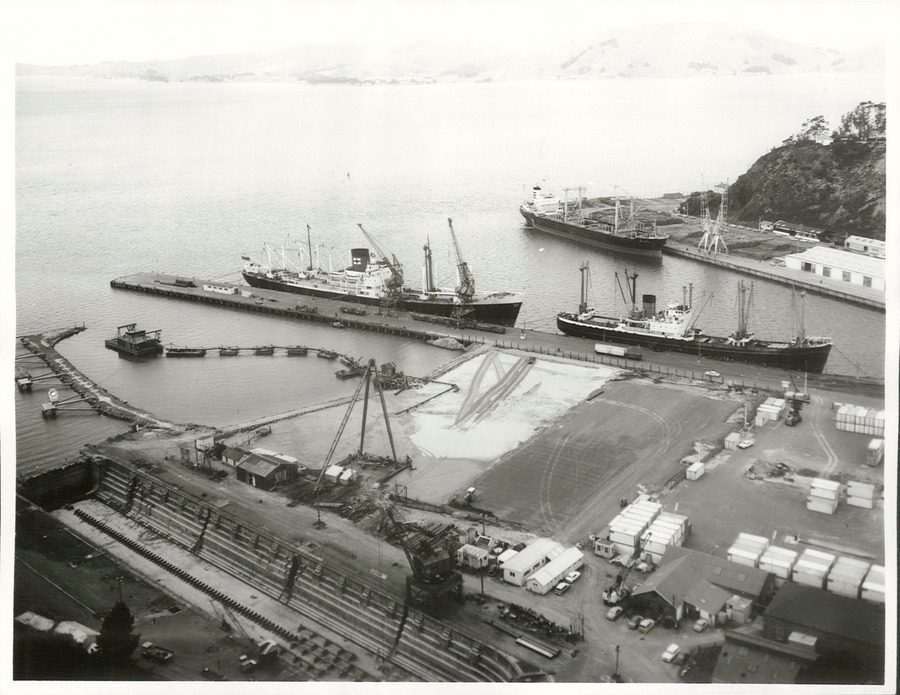
New reclamations at Port Chalmers (1972)

The selection of Port Chalmers as the South Island's first container terminal in 1971 re-established Port Chalmers as the South Island's major commercial port.

In 1979, passenger trains between Port Chalmers and Dunedin ceased after 106 years of operation. All of the buildings at the Upper Station were subsequently removed. Container freight traffic continued to grow, alongside a new timber trade, but the greatly reduced labour needs of these trades saw the town's population lessen.

Controversial attempts to site an aluminium smelter at Aramoana at the mouth of the harbour in 1975 and 1980 did not succeed.

From the 1970s, an artists' colony grew up in Port Chalmers and Carey's Bay, contributing to tensions over the port's continuing industrial development and changing the demographics of the town.

In 1987, the Port Chalmers Old Identities Society's collection was transferred to the old Post Office building and reopened as the Port Chalmers Museum. This has since been renamed the Port Chalmers Maritime Museum.

== Geography ==
Port Chalmers covers a small peninsula situated within the Otago Harbour. Most of the port is reclaimed land, with Beach Street bordering the now reclaimed Kōpūtai Bay. Quarantine Island/Kamau Taurua and Goat Island / Rakiriri bridge the harbour between Port Chalmers and the Otago Peninsula.

Prior to the local body reorganisation in the 1980s, Port Chalmers was made up of several suburbs (as well as the central area): Roseneath, Blanket Bay, Upper Junction, Brick Hill, Sawyers Bay, Mussel Bay, Upper Port Chalmers, Dalkeith, Careys Bay, Reynoldstown, Deborah Bay, Hamilton Bay, Waipuna Bay, Te Ngaru, and Aramoana; as well as the outlying townships of Long Beach, Pūrākanui and several other smaller nearby villages and farmsteads.

The main street of Port Chalmers is George Street. The centre of the town is in a low-lying valley and is more dense than the rest of Port Chalmers.

Many of Port Chalmers' street names reference its early history.

- Wickliffe, Laing, Victory, Bernicia, Mary and Ajax Streets: all named after early immigrant ships
- Scotia Street: early settler John Jones' favourite schooner
- Burns Street: Rev. Thomas Burns
- Currie Street: Alexander Currie, a director of the New Zealand Company
- George and Grey Streets: George Grey
- Harrington Street [sic]: Thomas Cudbert Harington, the first secretary of the New Zealand Company.
- Campbell Buchanan Lane: commemorates a young Port Chalmers sailor who died in action in the Solomon Islands in January 1943.

The 55 m (180 ft) high Flagstaff Hill has a long history of slipping and had suffered significant slumping during a storm in 1999. In June 2019, Port Otago started $2.9 million project to stabilise the east and north-east sides of Flagstaff Hill and return Beach Street to its original position. A series of terraces is being created and approximately 45,000m³ of excess rock and sediment is to be removed.

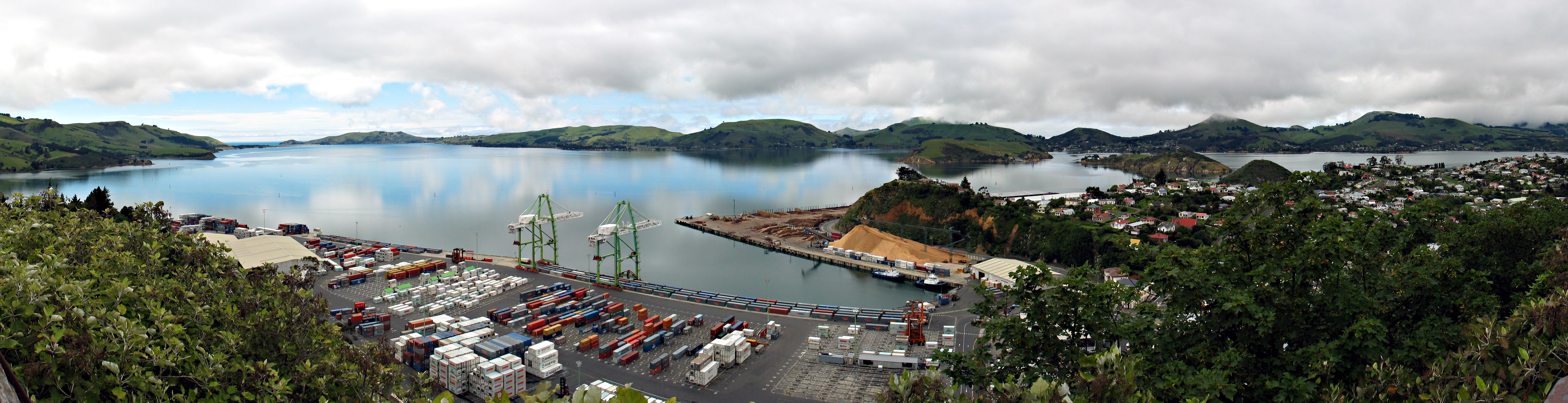
Panorama overlooking the Port

=== Climate ===
The climate of Port Chalmers in general is temperate; under the Köppen climate classification, it is classified as an oceanic climate. The average temperature is 10.8 °C (51.4 °F) and it has a relatively low rainfall for a New Zealand town, with a 716 millimetres (28.2 in) yearly average.

== Demographics ==
Port Chalmers covers 3.24 km^{2} (1.25 sq mi) and had an estimated population of 1,400 as of June 2025, with a population density of 432 people per km^{2}.

Historical population
| Year | Pop. | ±% p.a. |
|---|---|---|
| 2006 | 1,380 | — |
| 2013 | 1,419 | +0.40% |
| 2018 | 1,407 | −0.17% |

Port Chalmers had a population of 1,407 at the 2018 New Zealand census, a decrease of 12 people (−0.8%) since the 2013 census, and an increase of 27 people (2.0%) since the 2006 census. There were 630 households, comprising 690 males and 717 females, giving a sex ratio of 0.96 males per female. The median age was 45.2 years (compared with 37.4 years nationally), with 249 people (17.7%) aged under 15 years, 177 (12.6%) aged 15 to 29, 711 (50.5%) aged 30 to 64, and 270 (19.2%) aged 65 or older.

Ethnicities were 93.8% European/Pākehā, 12.2% Māori, 1.7% Pasifika, 2.6% Asian, and 2.8% other ethnicities. People may identify with more than one ethnicity.

The percentage of people born overseas was 17.9, compared with 27.1% nationally.

Although some people chose not to answer the census's question about religious affiliation, 65.9% had no religion, 22.4% were Christian, 0.2% were Hindu, 0.4% were Buddhist and 1.9% had other religions.

Of those at least 15 years old, 369 (31.9%) people had a bachelor's or higher degree, and 216 (18.7%) people had no formal qualifications. The median income was $29,200, compared with $31,800 nationally. 177 people (15.3%) earned over $70,000 compared to 17.2% nationally. The employment status of those at least 15 was that 540 (46.6%) people were employed full-time, 189 (16.3%) were part-time, and 54 (4.7%) were unemployed.

== Economy ==
=== Creative arts ===
The creative arts are still important to the area's economy; Port Chalmers and the surrounding suburbs of Careys Bay, Deborah Bay, Roseneath and Sawyers Bay have an arts community of painters, potters, musicians, jewellers, sculptors and writers.

=== Tourism ===
From the 1990s onwards, cruise ships began calling at Otago Harbour. During the 2018-2019 season, 104 vessels entered Port Chalmers, disembarking 153,000 of their 229,000 passengers. Following a peak of 120 ships visiting in one season, numbers have since declined. There were 79 vessels scheduled to visit during the 2025–2026 season, following 93 ships over summer 2024–2025, and 118 the season prior.

Local businesses have expressed concern over the economic impact of the decrease in cruise ship visits. The decline has been seen nationwide; total ship visits in the 2025–2026 season were down 41% from the peak season of 2023–2024. This change has been attributed to multiple causes, including a competitive market, international conflict, high costs in New Zealand and a fluctuating US dollar. Increases in government levies and additional rules around the management of biofouling have also been associated with the decline.

There have been protests at the port when ships arrive, with local activists highlighting the environmental impacts of cruise ships, and calling for emissions from the ships to be counted in the Dunedin Carbon Zero 2030 plan.

=== Port ===
As Dunedin grew, and particularly with the increase in commerce following the Otago gold rush of the 1860s, the merchants of Dunedin pushed for dredging of a channel to allow ocean-going vessels to reach the city's wharves. Though a contentious decision, it was agreed to dredge what became known as the Victoria Ship Channel along the north-western side of the harbour. The channel opened in 1881. The initial channel was narrow and shallow, and the first ship to use it (the Union Steam Ship Company's SS Penguin) temporarily grounded while using it. The channel was gradually widened and deepened, and by 1907, twice as many ships were using Dunedin's wharves as used Port Chalmers. Rivalry between Dunedin and Port Chalmers developed over which would handle the bulk of shipping. However, ship servicing and building industries developed in Port Chalmers, and the adjacent Carey's Bay became a fishing port.

A 170 ft (51.8 m) long by 42 ft (12.8 m) wide by 16 ft (4.9 m) deep wooden floating dock called the Alpha was built and launched in 1868 at Port Chalmers W. Murray and Co., under a 5-year guarantee from the Provincial Government.

In 1868, construction of a 100 m (330 ft) long graving dock began. This dock cost £56,069 2s 11d. The new dock, alongside the increasing size of ships resulted in reduced demand for the earlier floating dock, which was finally beached at Carey's Bay. The remains of the dock were still visible as late as the 1940s.

Owing to the need to accommodate increasingly larger vessels, a new graving dock was constructed by the Otago Dock Trust between 1905 and 1909, at a cost of £74,475. It was 572 ft (174.3 m) long, which allowed it to take vessels up to 530 ft (161.5 m) in length. Once the dock was completed, the Otago Dock Trust merged with the Otago Harbour Board, on 21 May 1910.

In April 1928, the 527.2 ft (160.7 m) long Norwegian whaling ship, C.A. Larsen became the largest vessel serviced by the graving dock.

The first all-container ship to visit New Zealand was the Columbus New Zealand, which berthed at Beach Street Wharf on 26 June 1971, before the container terminal had been built. It used its own on-board crane whose arm folded out to land or pick up containers from the wharf.

The redevelopment lead to the closing in 1975 and filling in of the graving dock, while the wharves were replaced by two berths – the later multi-purpose berth is to the right – and a heavy-duty paved space for storing, washing and devanning (unpacking) containers.

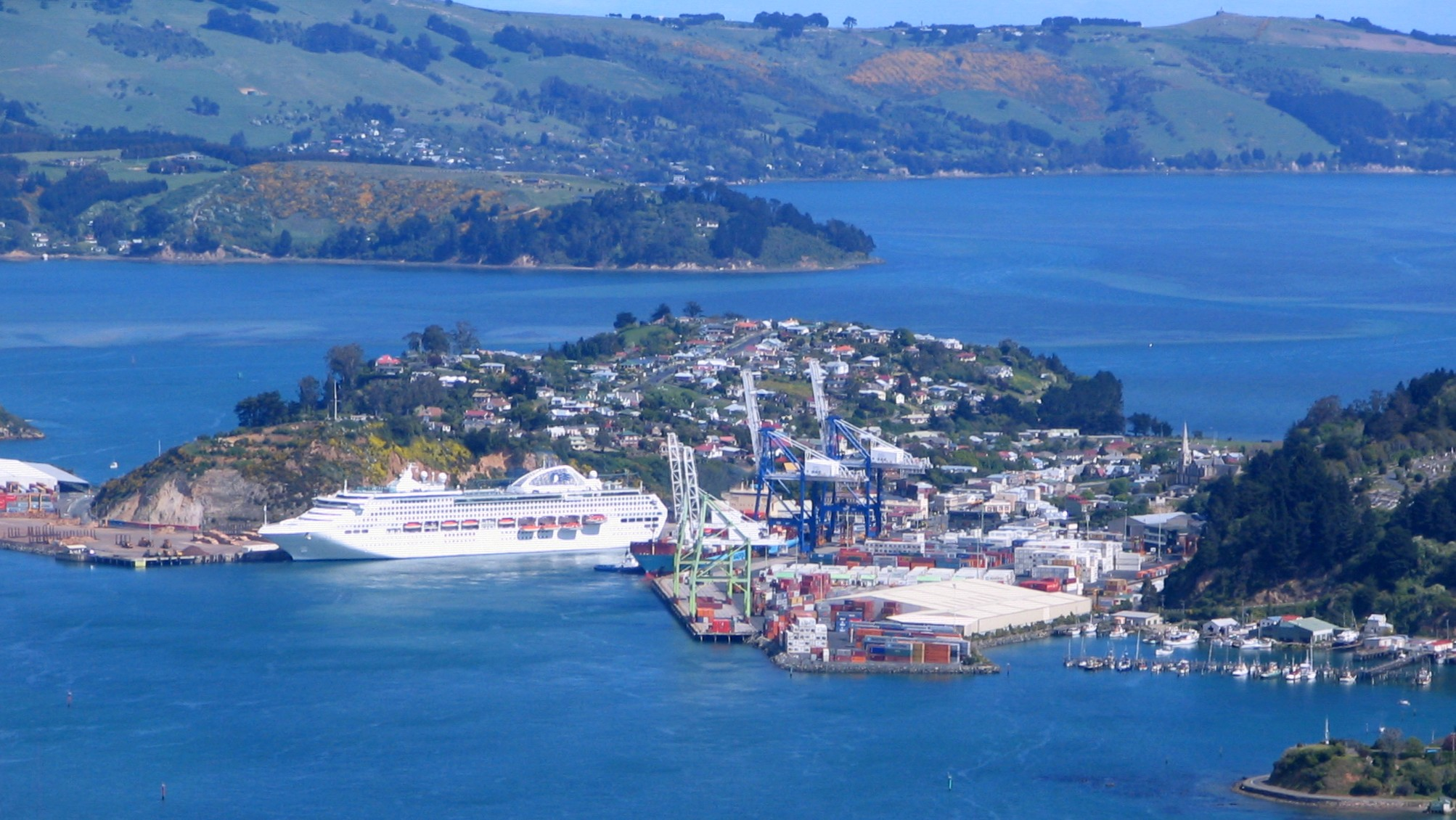
Port Chalmers from the northeast, the cruise ship Dawn Princess and a container ship in port

The port currently has three berths suitable for handling containerised, multi-purpose, and conventional vessels; Beach St, the container berth and three multi-purpose berths. The swinging basin has been dredged to 13.5 m (44 ft), with a turning diameter of 487 m (1,598 ft). In 2019, a $23 million, 135 m (443 ft) long extension to the existing multi-purpose berth, increasing its total length to 431 m (1,414 ft) was completed.

Although the Victoria Channel has been gradually widened and kept dredged to a depth of 8 m (26 ft), modern cruise ships and container vessels are so big that they often draw in excess of the depth restriction. Additionally, the narrowness of the channel means they must be piloted along it by tugs. As a result, being closer to the open sea as well as easier berthing makes Port Chalmers the preferred port of call. In the 2018–2019 financial year, 208,600 containers were handled by the port while 1.15 million tonnes of logs were exported between the Dunedin and Port Chalmers wharves.

==== Management ====
The Customs Department was initially responsible for control of Otago Harbour with the Collector of Customs acting as harbour master, until 1859, when the Provincial Council took responsibility and appointed a dedicated harbour master.

The Otago Harbour Board was established on 30 June 1874 and took over responsibility for the harbour and the provision of facilities. The wharves at Port Chalmers were managed by the Railways Department until 1928, when they were taken over by the Otago Harbour Board. The following year the Otago Harbour Board moved its headquarters to Port Chalmers.

In 1988, the Otago Harbour Board was replaced by a quasi-autonomous local government entity, Port Otago Ltd.

=== Industry ===
==== Quarrying ====
A quarry known as the "Big Quarry" was opened on Church Street in March 1866 and operated until it closed in 1920. This supplied Port Chalmers breccia, locally known as bluestone, which was used in the foundations of the Dunedin Railway Station, the Otago Boys' High School, the University of Otago Clocktower, Dunedin Town Hall and in the Port Chalmers Graving Dock and to construct many other buildings in the area. The site is now home to the Lady Thorn Rhododendron Dell.

==== Ship building ====
Beginning with the construction of the 13-ton schooner Sarah, which was launched in 1859, shipbuilding became an important activity at Port Chalmers. Notable following vessels were the 70-ton steamer Taiaroa (1865), the 50-ton schooner Maid of Otago (1870), the 70-ton schooner Friendship (1871) and the 70-ton schooner Mary Ogilvie (1873). In 1861, William Isbister constructed at Carey's Bay the first patent slip of its kind in New Zealand. He soon built a second slip and on them carried out ship repairs and built a number of small vessels, among them the paddle steamer Tuapeka (1863), the 28-ton schooner Cymraes (1864) and the dredge New Era (1867). Other shipbuilders based at Port Chalmers were Sutherland & McKay, Knewstubb Brothers (from the late 1880s until 1905), Miller Bros, Miller & Tunnage and Morgan & Cable. Morgan & Cable later changed its name first to the Maori Iron Works and later in 1906 to Stevenson & Cook, which during the Second World War built seven Castle class minesweepers at Boiler Point for service with Royal New Zealand Navy. Boiler Point took its name from an abandoned ship's boiler. After the war, the company built the penstocks for the Roxburgh Power Station, before eventually closing in 1958, due to a diminishing workload. The company's facilities were taken over by Sims Engineering Ltd, who built tugs and in 1984, launched the 1,056-ton dredge New Era. As of 2006, it was the largest powered vessel built in New Zealand. Sims closed in about 1990.

==== Ship repair ====
The construction of the floating dock and then the graving dock allowed the port to establish itself as a centre of ship repair. The Union Steam Ship Company was established in Dunedin in 1875 and in the same year, established a workshop at Port Chalmers to repair both its own and other companies' ships. The company purchased the hulk of the barque ''Don Juan'' in 1878 and moored it between the Bowen and George Street piers, where it was used as a carpenters' workshop and sailmakers loft. As demand for the workshop's services increased in 1889, the company moved its workshops and sailmakers loft to an existing three-storey building. In 1897, the company constructed a new much bigger building on reclaimed land with further expansion in the following year. Until 1920, Port Chalmers was the company's main repair facility; in that year, the company moved its headquarters to Wellington, followed by the establishment of its main repair centre in that city. The facilities at Port Chalmers declined in importance until they finally closed in 1975.

Between 1920 and 1930, a large number of the Norwegian whaling vessels based at Stewart Island were refurbished by the workshops of the Union Stream Ship Company. The Second World War was a particularly busy period due to repairs being required on vessels damaged by the enemy.

== Governance ==
Until 1853, public works were undertaken by the Governor of New Zealand and from thereafter by the Provincial Government, but little was spent on local development. In 1855, the town obtained a directly elected representative on the Provincial Government when the council was restructured into eight electable districts of which the town was one. The town obtained its first directly elected local governance when a nine member Town Board was formed in 1860, following the passing of the Port Chalmers and Invercargill Town Board ordinance in 1859.

On 9 April 1866, the town became a municipality and then a borough in 1884. The first mayor of the borough was Daniel Rolfe. By 1905, the borough was divided into four wards—High, East, Middle and South.

David Alexander De Maus (1847–1925) was mayor four times between 1899 and 1913. He operated a photography business in Port Chalmers and was known for his maritime photographs. In 1893, he was the first person in New Zealand to be prosecuted for selling an indecent photo (of a woman). It was possibly a reprint of a French academic study for artists that was legal in France.

Sir John Thorn (1911–2008) was mayor of Port Chalmers from 1956 for 33 consecutive years, until the borough of Port Chalmers and the whole surrounding district was dissolved and amalgamated into the enlarged City of Dunedin in 1989. His service made him the longest serving mayor of New Zealand (as of 2016). Today, Port Chalmers elects councillors to the Dunedin City Council, as part of the Waikouaiti-Chalmers Ward and is served by a local Community Board, the Chalmers Community Board.

Between 1878 and 1989, Port Chalmers had 23 mayors. The following is a complete list:

| | Name | Portrait | Term of office |
|---|---|---|---|
| 1 | Daniel Rolf | | 1866–1868 |
| 2 | Thomas Taylor | | 1868–1869 |
| 3 | Hugh McDermid | | 1870–1871 |
| 4 | Henry Dench | | 1871–1873 |
| (3) | Hugh McDermid | | 1873–1874 |
| 5 | Andrew McKinnon | | 1874–1878 |
| 6 | William Martin Innes | | 1878–1879 |
| 7 | William Murray | | 1879–1880 |
| (6) | William Martin Innes | | 1880–1883 |
| 8 | Thomas Hirst Dodson | | 1883–1884 |
| 9 | Edmund Allen | | 1884–1893 |
| 10 | John Watson, Jr | | 1893–1895 |
| (9) | Edmund Allen | | 1895–1896 |
| (6) | William Martin Innes | | 1896–1897 |
| 11 | John Mill | | 1897–1899 |
| 12 | David De Maus | | 1899–1901 |
| (11) | John Mill | | 1901–1902 |
| 13 | John Thomson | | 1902–1903 |
| (12) | David De Maus | | 1903–1906 |
| 14 | Isaac Stevenson | | 1906–1908 |
| (11) | John Mill | | 1908–1909 |
| (12) | David De Maus | | 1909–1910 |
| 15 | Frederick Platts | | 1910–1912 |
| (12) | David De Maus | | 1912–1913 |
| 16 | David Miller Mawson | | 1913–1914 |
| 17 | Thomas Scollay | | 1915–1917 |
| 18 | John Tait | | 1917–1919 |
| 19 | John McDonald Stevenson | | 1919–1922 |
| (10) | John Watson, Jr | | 1922–1925 |
| 20 | Thomas Anderson | | 1925–1929 |
| 21 | William George Love | | 1929–1931 |
| (10) | John Watson, Jr | | 1931–1935 |
| (17) | Thomas Scollay | | 1935–1941 |
| 22 | Herbert Watson | | 1941–1947 |
| (20) | Thomas Anderson | | 1947–1956 |
| 23 | John Thorn | | 1956–1989 |

== Culture ==
The creative arts are important to the area's economy; Port Chalmers and the surrounding suburbs of Careys Bay, Deborah Bay, Roseneath and Sawyers Bay have a thriving arts community and the town is a base for those living an alternative lifestyle. Various artists and musicians have lived in Port Chalmers, most notably late Māori artist Ralph Hotere. Hotere's former studio was on land at the tip of Observation Point, the large bluff overlooking the container terminal. When the port's facilities were expanded, part of the bluff was removed, including the area of Hotere's studio, despite strenuous objections from many of the town's residents. Part of the bluff close to the removed portion is now a sculpture garden, organised in 2005 by Hotere and featuring his works and those of other New Zealand modern sculptors.

=== Events ===
The biannual Seafood Festival takes place in September.

== Attractions / amenities ==
=== Churches ===
- Iona Church
- Holy Trinity Church
- St Mary, Star of the Sea Roman Catholic Church. Designed by Frank William Petrie this church held its first mass on 12 May 1878. Owing to a shortage of funds the planned spire was not built. Later the original stone facade was plastered over.

=== Historic buildings and equipment ===
- Municipal Building (Town Hall). The foundation stone was laid on 3 November 1888, and the building opened on 25 September 1889. It was originally built to house the Port Chalmers Town Hall, as well as the Town Clerk's office, the Fire Brigade, the Police Station (including the Sergeant's residence and cells), Court Rooms, Customs Office and Government Shipping Office. There was also a morgue that occupied a backroom downstairs. By the 1950s most of the government departments had ceased to use their offices, and when the courthouse closed in 1952, the library moved in to the old courtroom (which is today the foyer). When the fire brigade moved to a new site, its part of the building was used by various community groups. A major redevelopment of the whole building was completed in 2004, with the library and service centre moving into the area previously occupied by the fire brigade.
- Time ball. This was established in 1867 on the flagpole on top of Observation Point to assist in maritime timekeeping. Removed in 1970, a replacement was installed in 2020.
- Tunnel Hotel. This establishment located at 22 Beach St claims to be the oldest hotel south of Nelson, and the oldest continually operated business in New Zealand. It stands on the site of the 'Surveyors' Arms' which was opened by Alexander and Janet McKay sometime after their arrival in December 1844 and was licensed to sell alcohol by the Akaroa-based magistrate John Watson in 1846. It later changed its name to the Port Chalmers Hotel and finally to the Tunnel Hotel. The current building dates from 1875.

=== Museums, art galleries, and libraries ===
- Port Chalmers Maritime Museum is a small museum, occupying the former Post Office building (built in 1877) and classified as a Category 1 Historic Place by Heritage New Zealand Pouhere Taonga (https://www.heritage.org.nz/list-details/359/Port%20Chalmer's%20Post%20Office%20(Former)#details) The collection has been displayed in the present building since 1987, and has since been renamed the Regional Maritime Museum. In 2020 the building was leased to Port Otago for 35 years. and has been incorporated into their recently redeveloped Port Otago offices. The Museum collection is owned and operated by the Port Chalmers Historical Society Inc, formerly the Port Chalmers Early Settlers and Old Identities Association, founded in September 1913.

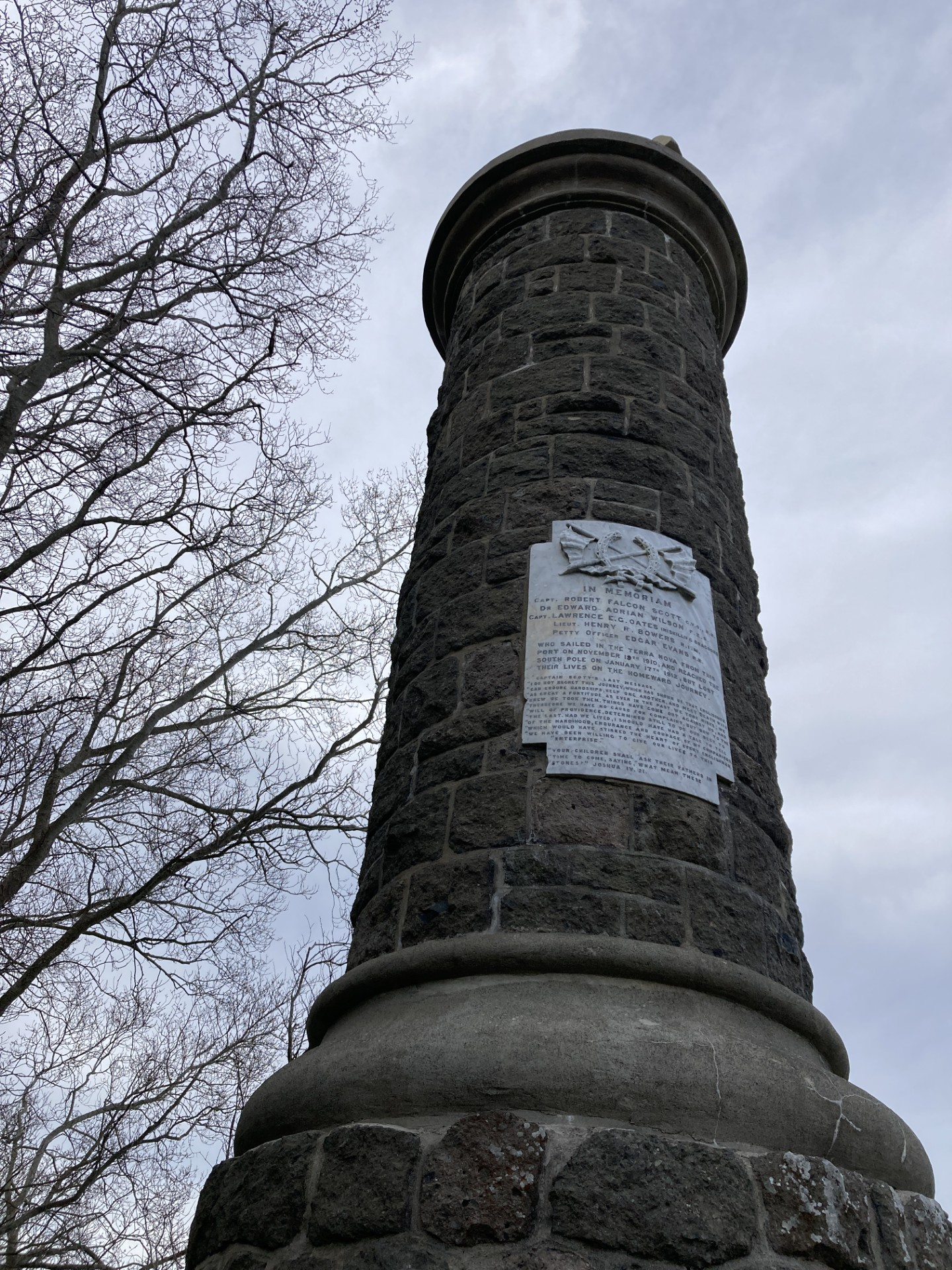
Photo of the Robert Scott Memorial

=== Memorials ===
- Scott Expedition Memorial. Upon news of the death of Captain Scott and members of his Antarctic exploratory party reaching New Zealand, the Port Chalmers Borough Council in March 1913 decided to erect a memorial cairn on Height Rock, overlooking the harbour. Paid for largely by public subscriptions the foundation stone was laid on 13 December 1913 and it was formally unveiled by Prime Minister W.F. Massey on 30 May 1914. The structure, designed by architect Robert Burnside, consists of a tall and gently tapering column of Port Chalmers bluestone, surmounted by an anchor. On the landward side is inset a marble tablet inscribed with (inter alia) the names of those who perished: Captain Robert Falcon Scott, Edward Adrian Wilson, Captain Lawrence E.G. Oates, Lieutenant Henry R. Bowers and Petty Officer Edgar Evans.

=== Parks and recreation ===
- Lady Thorn Rhododendron Dell. Following the closing of the "Big Quarry" on Church Street in 1920, it was then used in the 1950s as a tip where dunnage timber from visiting cargo ships was burnt. When this practice stopped in the 1960s it was used as rubbish dump and then became overgrown. Lady Constance Thorn ( -1997), a former long- time mayoress of the town, came up with the idea of turning the area into a dell of rhododendrons. The Port Chalmers and District Lions Club helped in 1998 to develop the garden, which they now maintain. A lookout accessed by stairs features a selection of old historic photographs of Port Chalmers over the years and also offers a view of the town and Otago Harbour.
- Hotere Garden Oputae. The former studio of noted artist Ralph Hotere (1931–2013) was on land at the tip of Observation Point, the large bluff overlooking the container terminal. When the port's facilities were expanded in 1993, part of the bluff was removed, including the area containing Hotere's studio (after strenuous objection from many of the town's residents). Part of the bluff close to the removed portion are converted by the Hotere Foundation Trust with the assistance of the Otago Harbour Board into a sculpture garden in 2005 containing featuring works by both Hotere and by other noted New Zealand modern sculptors. The sculptures were previously displayed at Hotere's studio and include: "Black Phoenix II" by Ralph Hotere, "Brick Column" by Russell Moses, "They do cut down the poles that hold up the sky" by Shona Rapira Davies and "Aramoana" by Chris Booth. In 2008 the garden by Design and Garden Landscapes Ltd won the Landscape Industries Association of NZ premier award for the best use of native plants, a gold award for landscape horticulture and a silver award for landscape design.

== Infrastructure ==
=== Transportation ===
State Highway 88 connects Port Chalmers to Dunedin. A public bus connection is provided to Dunedin by buses organised by the Otago Regional Council. Passenger rail services to Dunedin were previously available, until these were withdrawn in 1982 in favour of buses.

=== Utilities ===
In 1871, Thomson Brothers were given permission to construct a gasworks and a gas reticulation system. The gasworks was erected on Mount Street and by June 1872 the town was being lit by ten gas powered lamps with a gas supply to a number of houses soon following. In April 1888 the Port Chalmers Gas Company was formed and took over the gas system. They moved the gasworks to Mussel Bay and expanded the reticulation system. The Borough Council took over the system in 1918. From 1906 the wharves were lit by electricity but it wasn't until 1914 that electricity began to be supplied to the rest of the town.

== Education ==
From the time of the first settlement there were a number of small private schools in Port Chalmers. Some continued until the end of the 19th century. By 1905, education was provided by a District High School, a Roman Catholic school, a Technical School, and several private kindergartens. In 1906, when it was found that only 28 boys and one girl could swim out of a roll of 432 pupils at the local school, swimming lessons were added to the curriculum and held in the partially-filled graving dock.

=== Public ===
Following the proclamation of Port Chalmers and outlying districts as an Education District, a public school opened on 20 October 1856 in a building shared with the Magistrates Court on the corner of Grey and Scotia Streets. Pupils paid a fee. By 1859 the school had 36 pupils. In 1860 a dedicated school house was erected, by which time the roll had increased to 166. With the school continuing to expand both in number of rooms and pupils it was designated as the Port Chalmers Grammar School in 1869. In 1872 the school had a staff of four teaching 238 pupils. In 1875 staff and 401 pupils moved to a new school building, constructed on what had been previously the Police Camp Reserve. In 1879 the grammar school became the Port Chalmers District High School. In 1929 it reverted to being a primary school. Port Chalmers School had a roll of 82 students as of July 2026.

=== Roman Catholic ===
In 1882 St Mary's School was established and initially operated from a shed-like house. In 1898, Mother Mary MacKillop and two Josephite Sisters arrived in Dunedin at the request of the parish priest of Port Chalmers, to assist with teaching. When they arrived they found the existing school house to be in a state of disrepair. As a result of the endeavours of MacKillop, her fellow sisters, and the community, a new school, St Joseph's Primary School, was opened at the end of January 1898. MacKillop lived in Port Chalmers for two months and was the first Head of St Joseph's, teaching the Upper Standards. The second St Joseph's School building was opened in 1913 and was a two-story brick building that became a feature of the Port Chalmers landscape. The Sisters of St Joseph continued to run the school until 1979, before handing the role over to lay teachers. In 1987 the third St Joseph's School was built and became a state-integrated, co-educational Catholic primary school. St Joseph's School closed at the beginning of 2023.

== Notable people ==
- Pinky Agnew, actor and author.
- Orpheus Beaumont, inventor of the Salvus lifejacket.
- Arthur Winton Brown, Mayor of Wellington.
- Jean Begg, welfare worker and administrator.
- Learmonth White Dalrymple, educationalist.
- William Dow Duncan, All Black rugby union player.
- David Elliot, Illustrator and writer of children's books.
- John Grenell, real name John Hore, country and western singer.
- Ralph Hotere, artist.
- Russell Moses, artist.
- Mary MacKillop (Saint Mary of the Cross), Australia's first saint, lived for several months in Port Chalmers.
- Sir Vincent O'Sullivan, poet and novelist.
- Nadia Reid, Folk singer/songwriter.
- Robert Scott, musician.
- Dougal Stevenson, television personality.
- William Thompson, ship captain from Alloa.
- Sir John Thorn, Kt OBE JP mayor for 33 years
- E. T. C. Werner, sinologist and diplomat.

== Ship ==
Port Chalmers was also the appellation of a ship which sailed between England, Australia and New Zealand at the beginning of the 20th century. It was torpedoed in mid-October 1940 and sank, with some crew surviving 14 days at sea on the lifeboat.
