= Jimmy Farrell (footballer) =

Australian rules footballer, born 1919

Personal information
- Full name: Jimmy Farrell
- Born: 6 March 1919
- Died: 2 August 2007 (aged 88)
- Original team: St Monica's CYMS (CYMSFA)
- Height: 178 cm (5 ft 10 in)
- Weight: 70 kg (154 lb)
- Position: Half Forward

Playing career^{1}
| Years | Club | Games (Goals) |
| 1943 | Essendon | 4 (9) |
- ^{1} Playing statistics correct to the end of 1943.

Jimmy Farrell (6 March 1919 – 2 August 2007) was an Australian rules footballer who played with Essendon in the Victorian Football League (VFL).
