= List of schools in the Southland Region =

This is a list of schools in Invercargill and the rest of Southland, New Zealand.

Name	Years	Gender	Authority	Location	Territorial authority area	Decile (2015)	EQI (2024)	Roll (November 2024)	Website	School number	Opening year
Aparima College	7-13	Coed	State	Riverton / Aparima	Southland	6	493	218		409	1973
Ascot Community School	1-8	Coed	State	Hawthorndale	Invercargill	3	515	287		1625	1999
Aurora College	7-13	Coed	State	Heidelberg	Invercargill	2	545	586		548	2004
Balfour School	1-6	Coed	State	Balfour	Southland	10	433	68		3932	1887
Blackmount School (closed 2014)	1-8	Coed	State	Blackmount	Southland	-	-	3		3933	1901
Bluff School	1-8	Coed	State	Bluff	Invercargill	3	504	129		2120	1867
Brydone School (closed 2007)	1-6	Coed	State	Brydone	Southland	-	-	6	-	3936	1906
Cargill High School (closed 1998)	9-13	Coed	State	Appleby	Invercargill	-	-	-	-	406	1978
Central Southland College	9-15	Coed	State	Winton	Southland	6	459	599		399	1965
Clifton School (closed 2004)	1-6	Coed	State	Clifton	Invercargill	-	-	-	-	3939	1872
Clarendon School (closed 2004)	1-6	Coed	State	Kingswell	Invercargill	-	-	-	-	3937	1971
Collingwood Intermediate School (closed 2004)	7-8	Coed	State	Grasmere	Invercargill	-	-	-	-	-	1976
Dacre School (closed 2008)	1-8	Coed	State	Dacre	Southland	-	-	-	-	3942	1900
Dipton School	1-8	Coed	State	Dipton	Southland	9	439			3943	1877
Donovan Primary School	1-6	Coed	State	Grasmere	Invercargill	6	461	410		2119	2005
Drummond Primary School	1-8	Coed	State	Drummond	Southland	8	463	93		1650	1887
East Gore School	1-6	Coed	State	Gore	Gore	3	515	103		3946	1886
Edendale School	1-6	Coed	State	Edendale	Southland	8	431	137		3947	1909
Elston Lea Primary (closed 2004)	1-6	Coed	State	Strathern	Invercargill	-	-	-	-	3948	1984
Fiordland College	7-13	Coed	State	Te Anau	Southland	9	435	275		400	1976
Garston School	1-8	Coed	State	Garston	Southland	8	423	23		3953	1882
Glenham School	1-6	Coed	State	Glenham	Southland	8				3954	1899
Gore High School	9-15	Coed	State	Gore	Gore	6				396	1908
Gore Main School	1-6	Coed	State	Gore	Gore	7	443	205		3956	1878
Gorge Road School	1-8	Coed	State	Gorge Road	Southland	9	470	36		3957	1889
Grasmere Primary School (closed 2006)	1-8	Coed	State	Grasmere	Invercargill	-	-	-	-	3958	1928
Halfmoon Bay School	1-8	Coed	State	Oban	Southland	5	433	40		3961	1874
Hauroko Valley Primary School	1-8	Coed	State	Clifden	Southland	7	431	88		3938	Unknown
Hawthorndale Primary School (closed 1999)	1-6	Coed	State	Hawthorndale	Southland	-	-	-	-	3962	1958
Heddon Bush School	1-8	Coed	State	Heddon Bush	Southland	9	441	68		3963	1881
Hedgehope School	1-8	Coed	State	Hedgehope	Southland	10	452	52		3964	1878
Hillside Primary School	1-8	Coed	State	Browns	Southland	9	446	26		3935	Unknown
Invercargill Middle School	1-6	Coed	State	Invercargill Central	Invercargill	3	485	177		3966	1873
Invercargill South School (closed 2004)	1-6	Coed	State	Appleby	Invercargill	-	-	-	-	3968	1879
Isla Bank School (closed 2018)	1-8	Coed	State	Isla Bank	Southland	-	-	10	-	-	1899
James Hargest College	7-13	Coed	State	Hargest & Rosedale	Invercargill	8	445	1,903		552	1958
Kaiwera School (closed 2008)	1-8	Coed	State	Kaiwera	Gore	-	-	8	-	3970	1879
Kew School (closed 2005	1-6	Coed	State	Kew	Invercargill	-	-	-	-	3972	Unknown
Kingswell High School (closed 1998)	9-13	Coed	State	Heidelberg	Invercargill	-	-	-	-	-	1971
Knapdale School	1-8	Coed	State	Knapdale	Gore	8	446	64		3973	1879
Limehills School	1-8	Coed	State	Limehills	Southland	10	429	156		3975	1871
Lithgow Intermediate School (closed 1999)	1-8	Coed	State	Hawthorndale	Southland	-	-	-	-	3976	1965
Lochiel School	1-8	Coed	State	Lochiel	Southland	10	440			3977	1879
Longford Intermediate	7-8	Coed	State	Gore	Gore	4				3979	1972
Lumsden District High School (closed 1975)	1-13	Coed	State	Lumsden	Invercargill	-	-	-	-	-	1962
Lumsden School (closed 1962)	1-8	Coed	State	Lumsden	Southland	-	-	-	-	-	1879
Lumsden School	1-6	Coed	State	Lumsden	Southland					3980	1976
Maitland School (closed 1996)	1-8	Coed	State	Maitland	Gore	-	-	-	-	-	1896
Makarewa School	1-6	Coed	State	Makarewa	Invercargill	9	432	159		3982	1887
Mararoa School	1-8	Coed	State	The Key	Southland	10	416	37		3984	1914
Marist College (closed 1981)	7-13	Boys	State integrated (Catholic)	Rockdale	Invercargill	-	-	-	-	-	1969
Mataura Island School (closed 1998)	1-8	Coed	State	Mataura Island	Southland	-	-	-	-	3985	1890
Mataura School	1-6	Coed	State	Mataura	Gore	2	507	91		3986	1878
Menzies College	7-15	Coed	State	Wyndham	Southland	5	480	355		401	1885
Mossburn School	1-6	Coed	State	Mossburn	Southland	7	426	47		3990	1887
Mount Anglem College (closed 2003)	9-13	Coed	State	Heidelberg	Invercargill	-	-	-	-	-	1999
Myross Bush School	1-6	Coed	State	Myross Bush	Invercargill	10	408	184		3991	1866
New River Primary School	1-6	Coed	State	Kew	Invercargill	1	519	236		2116	2005
Newfield School (closed 2004)	1-6	Coed	State	Newfield	Invercargill	-	-	-	-	3992	Unknown
Newfield Park School	1-6	Coed	State	Newfield	Invercargill	3	505	247		2118	2005
Northern Southland College	7-15	Coed	State	Lumsden	Southland	7	460	193		395	1976
Otama School	1-8	Coed	State	Otama	Gore	9	483	17		3997	1883
Otatara School	1-6	Coed	State	Otatara	Invercargill	10	406	275		4000	1879
Otautau School	1-8	Coed	State	Otautau	Southland	6	458	154		4001	1880
Pukerau School	1-6	Coed	State	Pukerau	Gore	7	438	68		4003	1879
Rimu School	1-8	Coed	State	Kennington	Southland	9	439	116		4006	1893
Riversdale School	1-8	Coed	State	Riversdale	Southland	9	434	155		4007	1882
Riverton District High School (closed 1972)	1-13	Coed	State	Riverton / Aparima	Southland	-	-	-	-	-	1859
Riverton School	1-6	Coed	State	Riverton / Aparima	Southland	6	469	146		4008	1973
Rockdale Park School (closed 2004)	1-6	Coed	State	Rockdale	Invercargill	-	-	-	-	4009	1973
Rosedale Intermediate (closed 2004)	7-8	Coed	State	Rosedale	Invercargill	-	-	-	-	4010	1963
Ruru Special School	-	Coed	State	Waikiwi	Invercargill	4	524	119		4011	1967
Sacred Heart School	1-6	Coed	State integrated (Catholic)	Waikiwi	Invercargill	9	432	76		4013	1962
Salford School	1-6	Coed	State	Hargest	Invercargill	8	424	285		4014	1970
Seaward Downs School (closed 1975)	1-8	Coed	State	Seaward Downs	Southland	-	-	-	-	-	1891
Southland Adventist Christian School	1-8	Coed	State integrated (Adventist)	Waikiwi	Invercargill	5	448	112		4112	1955
Southland Boys' High School	7-13	Boys	State	Gladstone	Invercargill	6	467	985	404	1881	
Southland Girls' High School	7-13	Girls	State	Georgetown	Invercargill	5	466	1,031		405	1879
St Catherine's College (closed 1981)	7-13	Girls	State integrated (Catholic)	Rockdale	Invercargill	-	-	-	-	-	1882
St George Primary (closed 2004)	1-6	Coed	State	Strathern	Invercargill	-	-	-	-	4024	1915
St John's Girls' School	1-8	Girls	State integrated (Catholic)	Avenal	Invercargill	9	405	140		4131	1917
St Joseph's School	1-8	Coed	State integrated (Catholic)	Invercargill Central	Invercargill	3	479	183		4017	1882
St Mary's School	1-6	Coed	State integrated (Catholic)	Gore	Gore	7	426	224		4018	1890
St Patrick's School, Invercargill	1-6	Coed	State integrated (Catholic)	Heidelberg	Invercargill	3	476	297		4020	1944
St Patrick's School, Nightcaps	1-8	Coed	State integrated (Catholic)	Nightcaps	Southland	2	552	23		4019	1917
St Peter's College	7-15	Coed	State integrated (Catholic)	Gore	Gore	8	438	383		397	1969
St Teresa's School, Bluff	1-8	Coed	State integrated (Catholic)	Bluff	Invercargill	3	498	14		4021	1901
St Theresa's School, Invercargill	1-6	Coed	State integrated (Catholic)	Windsor	Invercargill	7	409	286		4022	1931
St Thomas School, Winton	1-8	Coed	State integrated (Catholic)	Winton	Southland	9	413	111		4023	1898
Surrey Park School (closed 1999)	1-8	Coed	State	Hawthorndale	Southland	-	-	-	-	4025	1940
Takitimu Primary School	1-8	Coed	State	Nightcaps	Southland	4	468	104		398	1884
Te Anau School	1-6	Coed	State	Te Anau	Southland	9	423	325		4026	1937
Fernworth Primary School / Te Kura o Whare Pā	1-6	Coed	State	Strathern	Invercargill	2	530	288		2117	2005
Te Tipua School	1-8	Coed	State	Te Tipua	Southland	5	493	30		4027	1907
Te Wharekura o Arowhenua	1-15	Coed	State	Newfield	Invercargill	2	536	199		4217	1992
Thornbury School	1-6	Coed	State	Thornbury	Southland	7	429	71		4028	1883
Tisbury School	1-6	Coed	State	Tisbury	Invercargill	4	466	115		4029	1891
Tokanui School	1-8	Coed	State	Tokanui	Southland	10	452	51		4030	1885
Tuturau Primary School	1-6	Coed	State	Tuturau	Southland	4	488	22		4032	1871
Tweedsmuir Intermediate School (closed 1998)	7-8	Coed	State	Georgetown	Invercargill	-	-	-	-	4033	1943
Tweedsmuir Junior High School (closed 2004)	7-10	Coed	State	Georgetown	Invercargill	-	-	-	-	4033	1999
Verdon College	7-13	Coed	State integrated (Catholic)	Rockdale	Invercargill	6	461	713		408	1982
Waianiwa School	1-8	Coed	State	Waianiwa	Southland	9	435	70		4034	1863
Waiau Area School	1-15	Coed	State	Tuatapere	Southland	3	525			402	1910
Waihopai School	1-6	Coed	State	Gladstone	Invercargill	8	423	339		4035	1914
Waikaia School	1-8	Coed	State	Waikaia	Southland	9	421	22		4036	1882
Waikaka School	1-8	Coed	State	Waikaka	Gore	10	431	68		4037	1863
Waikaka Valley School (closed 1996)	1-8	Coed	State	Maitland	Gore	-	-	-	-	-	1877
Waikiwi School (closed 2005)	1-8	Coed	State	Waikiwi	Invercargill	-	-	-	-	4039	1872
Waimahaka School (closed 2012)	1-8	Coed	State	Waimahaka	Southland	-	-	4	-	4040	1901
Waimumu School (closed 1996)	1-8	Coed	State	Waimumu	Gore	-	-	-	-	3970	1888
Wallacetown School	1-6	Coed	State	Wallacetown	Southland	9	448	75		4046	1865
Waverley Park School	1-6	Coed	State	Windsor	Invercargill	4	494	263		4047	1954
West Gore School	1-6	Coed	State	Gore	Gore	6	480	165		4050	1953
West Plains School (closed 2005)	1-8	Coed	State	West Plains	Invercargill	-	-	-	-	4051	1882
Willowbank School (closed 2016)	1-8	Coed	State	Maitland	Gore	-	-	-	-	3981	1997
Windsor North School	1-6	Coed	State	Windsor	Invercargill	8	420	335		3967	1877
Winton School	1-8	Coed	State	Winton	Southland	7	464	291		4052	1870
Woodlands Full Primary School	1-8	Coed	State	Woodlands	Southland	10	440	116		4053	1871
Wyndham School	1-6	Coed	State	Wyndham	Southland	6	453	143		4054	1885
