= Menzies Ferry =

Populated place in New Zealand

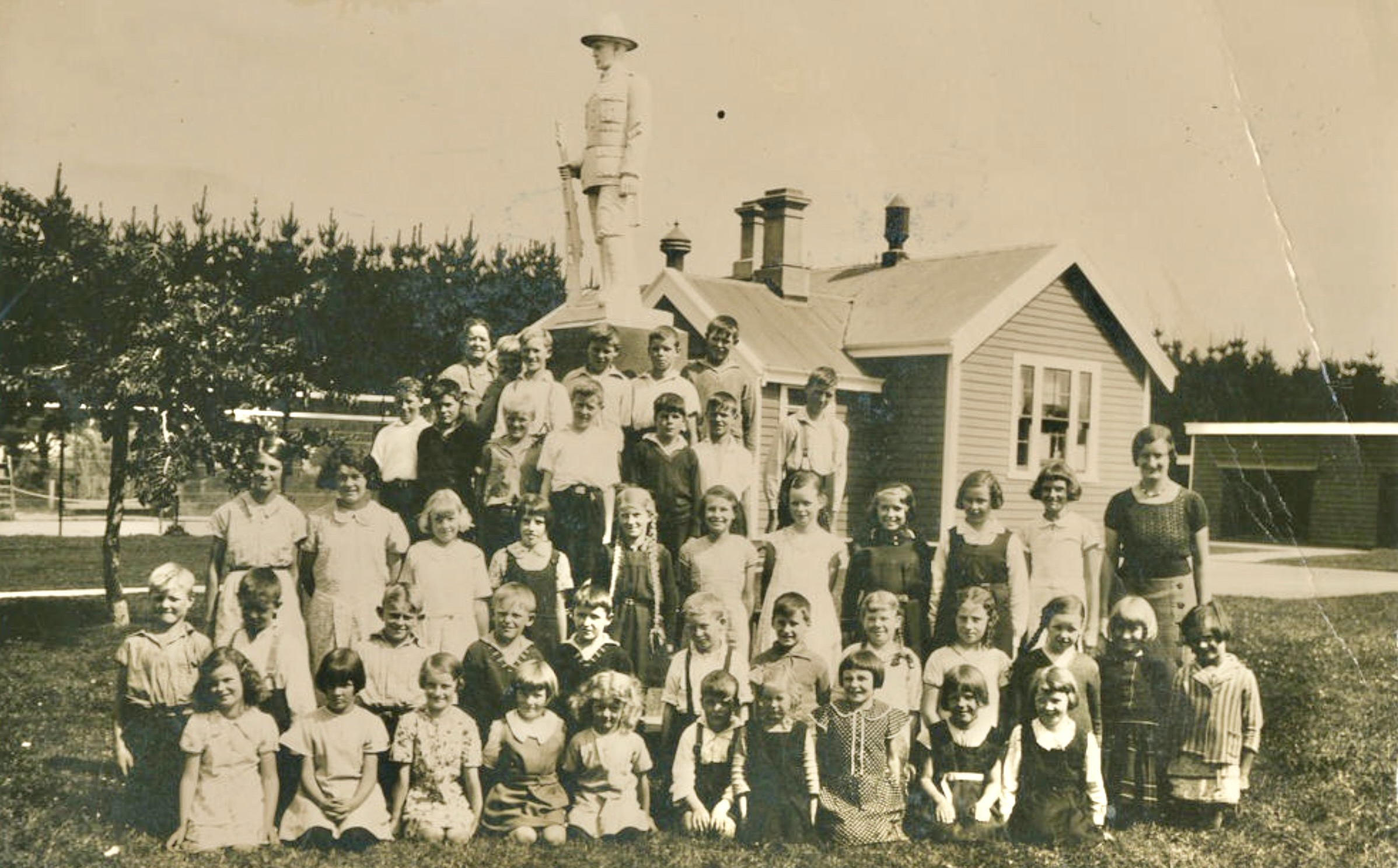
- Menzies Ferry school and memorial in 1920s
- Interactive map of Menzies Ferry
- Coordinates: 46°21′S 168°49′E
- Country: New Zealand
- Region: Southland
- Territorial authority: Southland District
- Community board: Waihopai-Toetoe

Government
  - Territorial Authority: Southland District Council
  - Regional council: Southland Regional Council
- Postcode(s): 9891, 9893

Menzies Ferry is a farming locality on the west side of the Mataura River in the east of Southland District, in the south of New Zealand. It gained its name from Dr. James Alexander Robertson Menzies, who supplied a boat to ferry passengers across the Mataura. It was surveyed as a township in 1876.

Surrounding communities are Edendale to the north-west, Wyndham to the north-east, Mataura Island to the south, and Seaward Downs to the south-west. The terrain of the locality is generally flat, with a measured elevation of 26 metres above sea level at the centre of the area. There is no bridge across the Mataura here, the nearest bridges are upstream at Wyndham, and downstream on the road to Mataura Island. The main thoroughfare through Menzies Ferry, named Island Edendale Road, runs from the Edendale-Wyndham Road to the north, southwards to the Seaward Downs-Mataura Island Road just before the bridge.

== History ==
Menzies Ferry is part of the Murihiku Block, bought by the Government in 1853, and shares it early history with the rest of Southland. It had a mail delivery by 1867 Menzies Ferry Hotel by 1873 (it lost its licence in 1894) and parts of the township were sold off from 1877.

There was a railway station named Menzies Ferry to the north on the Wyndham Branch, this closed to passengers in 1931, and to goods at or by the time the line closed in 1962. Edendale became the closest station for rail traffic thereafter. There was also a school and dairy factory in the centre of the locality. There still is a war memorial, which was erected in the school grounds, and unveiled on Anzac Day, 1922. Close by is an information kiosk about the history of Menzies Ferry, with a path and base built by Menzies College students.

In January 1911, two children and their father, who tried to rescue them, were burnt to death when their farmhouse caught fire during the early morning milking time. The mother, now without children and a husband, sold the property soon afterwards.

Map of Township of Menzies Ferry (1878)

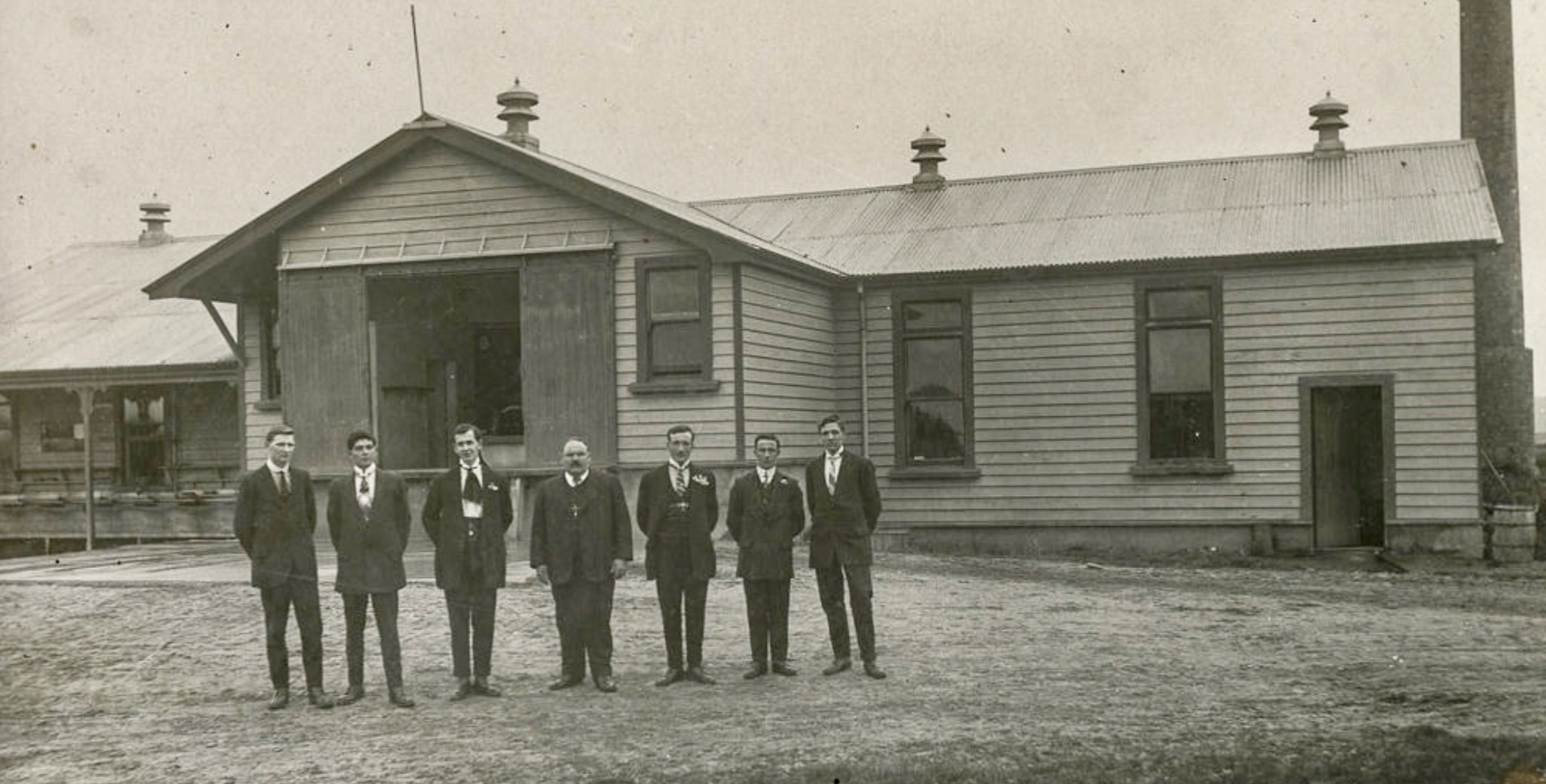
Menzies Ferry dairy factory in 1916

=== Menzies Ferry Dairy Factory ===
A cheese factory, supplied with milk from 24 farms, opened on 25 November 1910, across the road from the school. There was a fire at the factory in 1961.

=== Menzies Hall ===
Records of the Hall date from July 18 1913 to 1992. The formal opening of the hall was on Friday 9 December 1913. Records of the Hall date from July 18 1913 to 1992.

=== School ===
A report in 1884 said there were 30 children from Menzies Ferry attending school in Wyndham and recommended not forming a local school. A 1904 report said some children were 5 mi (8.0 km) from Wyndham school. Eventually Menzies Ferry School was opened, at a cost of £237.10s, with the first teacher being Mary Campbell and a school committee elected in November 1906. The school celebrated its jubilee in 1966. Records of the school pool, maintenance, etc ended in 1988.
