= Locations in New Zealand with a Scottish name =

This is a list of placenames in Scotland which have subsequently been applied to parts of New Zealand by Scottish emigrants or explorers.

The South Island also contains the Strath-Taieri and the Ben Ohau Range of mountains, both combining Scots Gaelic and Māori origins, as does Glentaki, in the lower valley of the Waitaki River. Invercargill has the appearance of a Scottish name, since it combines the Scottish prefix "Inver" (Inbhir), meaning a river's mouth, with "Cargill", the name of Scottish early settler William Cargill. (Invercargill's main streets are named after Scottish rivers, e.g., Dee, Tay, Spey, Esk, Don, Doon, Clyde.) Inchbonnie is a hybrid of Lowland Scots and Scottish Gaelic.

== North Island ==
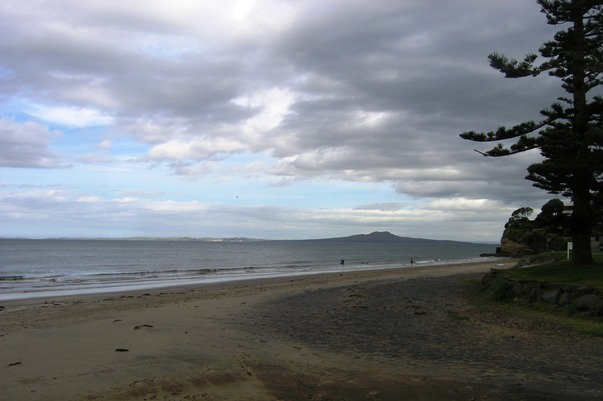
Rothesay Bay Beach with Rangitoto Island in the distance in the Hauraki Gulf.

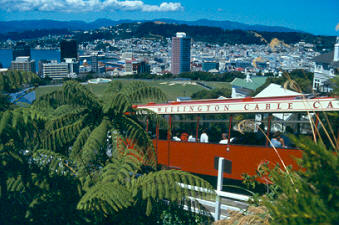
Panorama of Wellington including the Kelburn cable car.

- Auckland suburbs (incl. North Shore City, Waitakere, Manukau)
  - Ardmore
  - Ardmore, New Zealand + Ardmore Airport
  - Balmoral, New Zealand
  - Glen Eden, New Zealand
  - Glen Innes, New Zealand
  - Glendene, New Zealand
  - Glendowie, New Zealand
  - Glenfield, New Zealand
  - Henderson, New Zealand
  - Kirkbride, New Zealand (Māngere)
  - Murrays Bay
  - Rothesay Bay
- Aberfeldy, Manawatū-Whanganui
- Blairlogie, Masterton District
- Cape Campbell
- Cape Egmont
- Dalmeny Corner (Coromandel)
- Eskdale, New Zealand (Hawkes Bay)
- Firth of Thames (from the Scottish word "firth")
- Frasertown, New Zealand
- Gisborne suburbs
  - Elgin, New Zealand
- Glenbrook, New Zealand (Waikato)
- Glenburn, Carterton District
- Glendhu, South Wairarapa District
- Glendowie, New Zealand
- Huntly
- Kinloch, New Zealand
- Laingholm
- Langdale, Masterton District
- Mackenzie Bay (on Rangitoto Island)
- Morrisons Bush, South Wairarapa District
- Napier, New Zealand
- Stronvar, Masterton District
- Waverley, New Zealand (Taranaki, after Walter Scott's hero "Waverley")
- Wellington suburbs
  - Kelburn, New Zealand, named for David Boyle, 7th Earl of Glasgow
  - Kilbirnie, New Zealand
  - Roseneath
  - Seatoun

== South Island ==
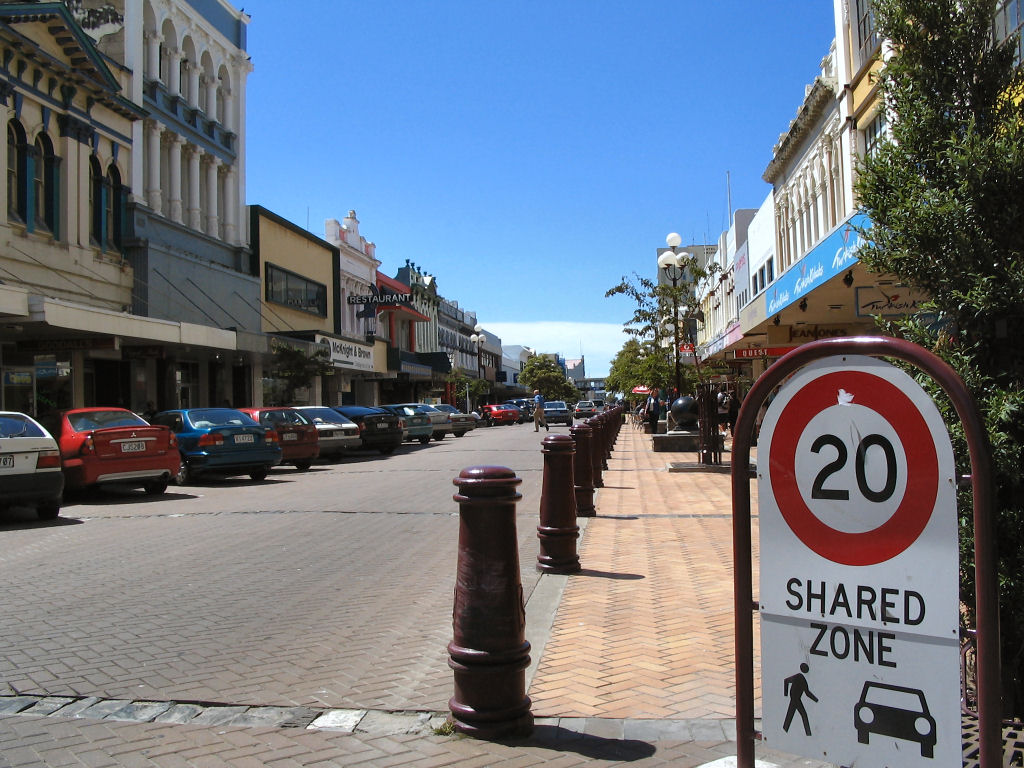
Cnr of Esk and Dee Streets, looking up Esk st, one of the main shopping streets of Invercargill.

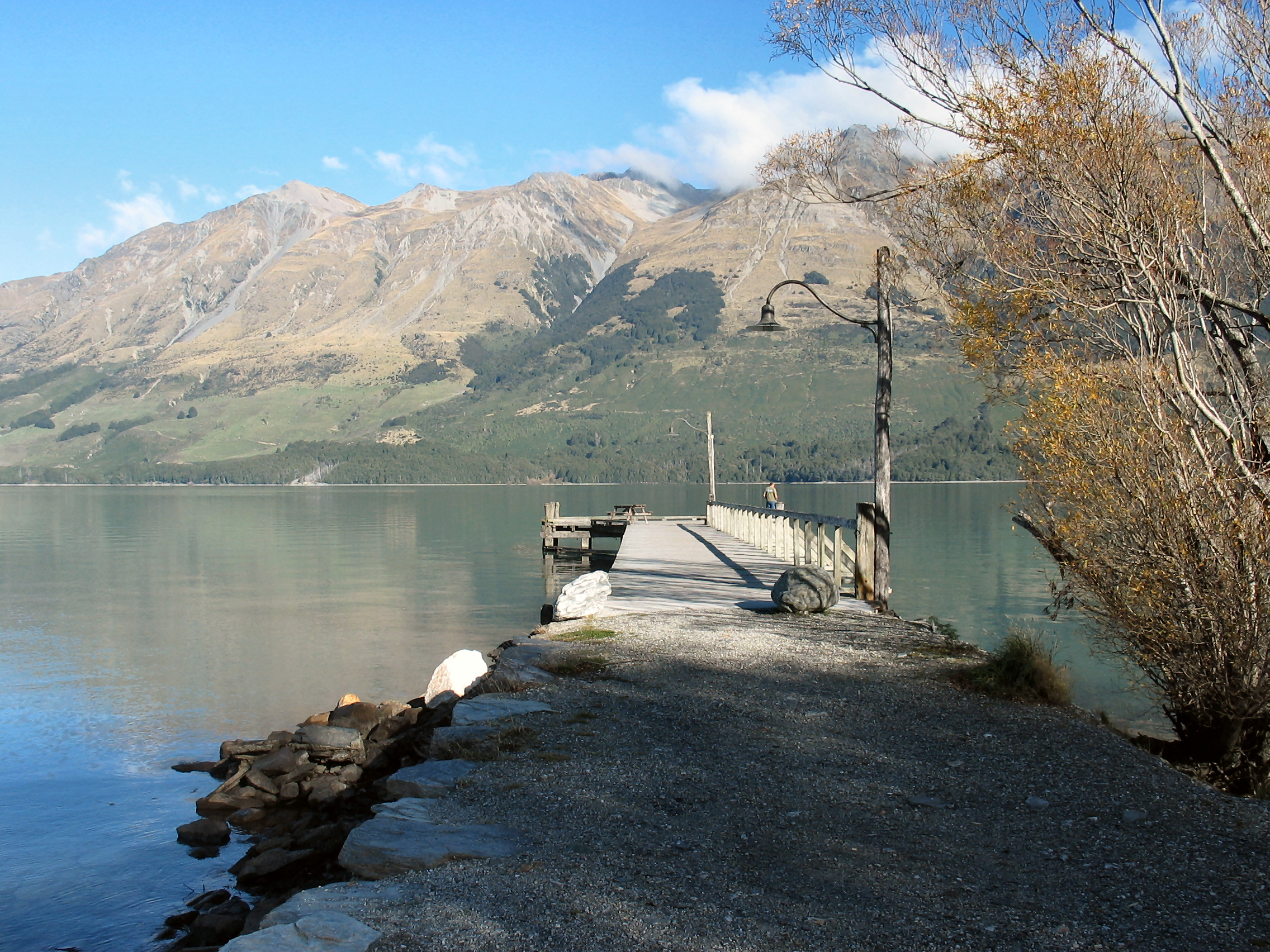
Looking at Lake Wakatipu from Glenorchy

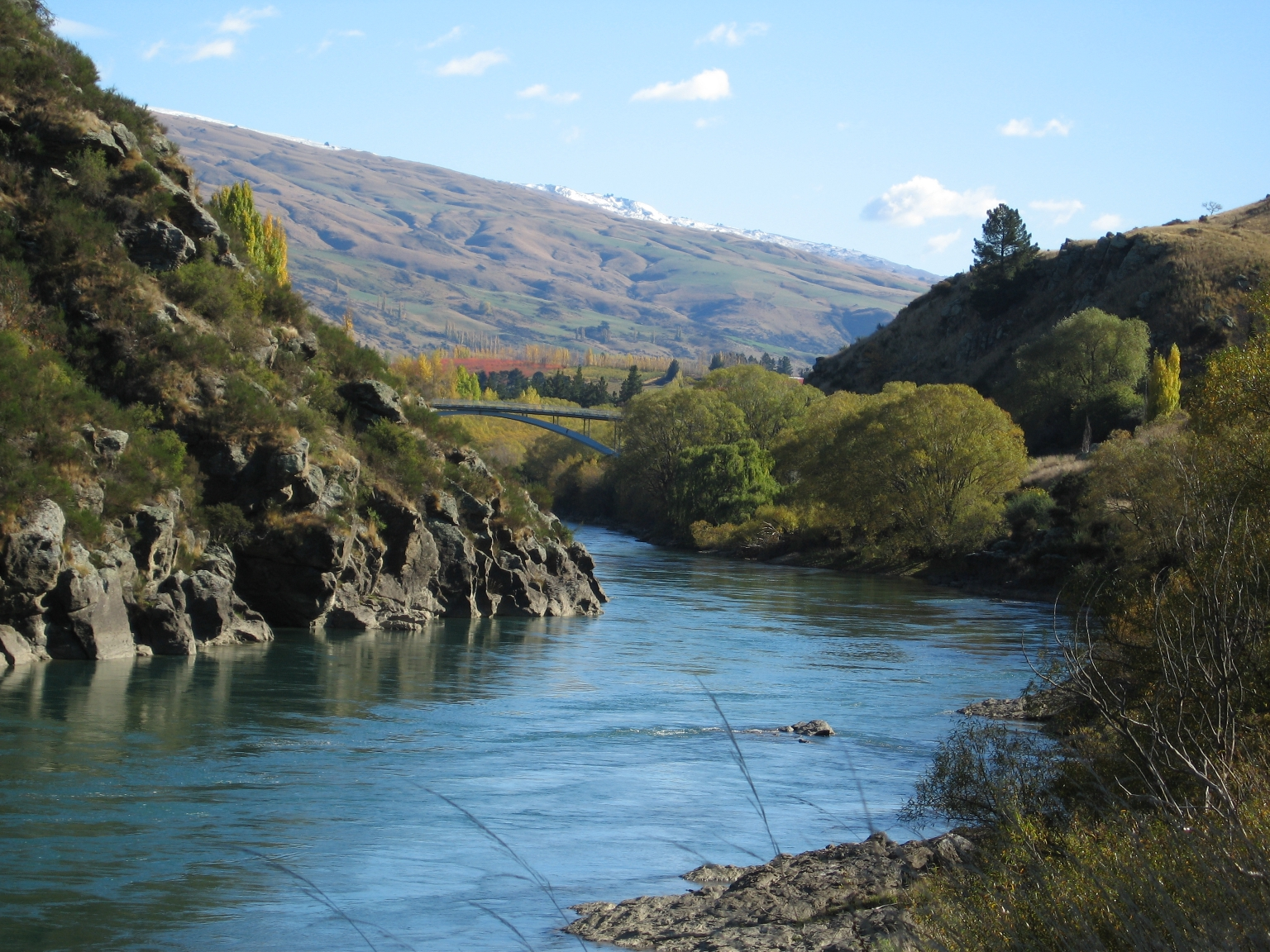
View of the Clutha River towards Roxburgh Bridge.

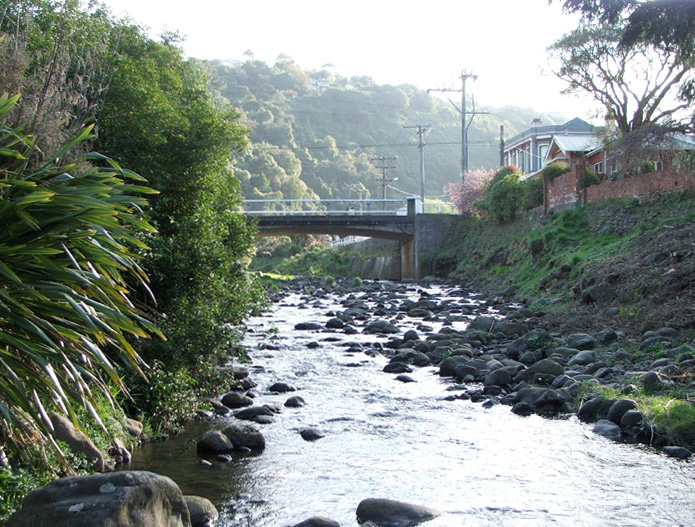
Upper reaches of the Water of Leith, Woodhaugh, Dunedin

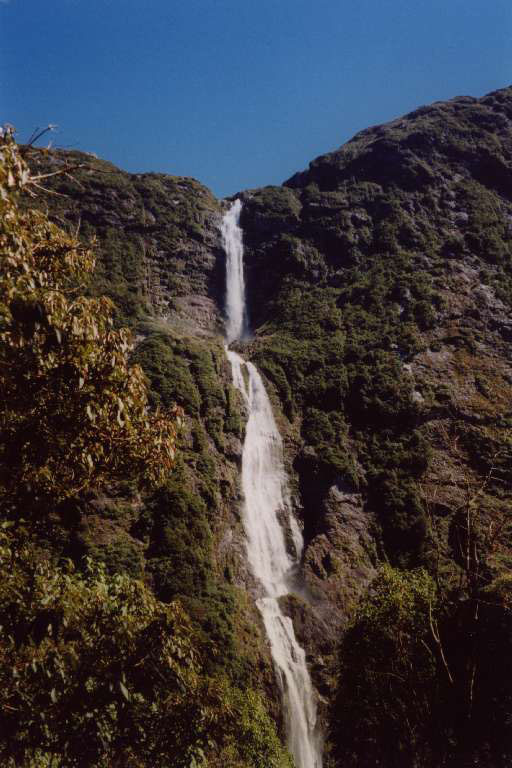
Sutherland Falls

- Athol, New Zealand
- Aviemore, New Zealand
- Avon River / Ōtākaro - named as Avon River by the Deans Brothers.
- Balclutha - from the Gaelic for 'Clydetown' (Baile Chluaidh)
- Balfour
- Bannockburn, New Zealand
- Blackmount, New Zealand
- Ben McLeod
- Benmore Range (mountains)
- Ben Nevis, New Zealand
- Chatto Creek
- Cheviot
- Christchurch suburbs
  - Burnside, Canterbury (from burn, the Scots word for a small river)
  - Riccarton, New Zealand
- Clutha River (from "Cluaidh", Scots Gaelic for "Clyde")
- Clyde
- Craigieburn
  - Craigieburn Range
- Denniston (Dennistoun)
- Drummond
- Dumbarton
- Dunback
- Duncan Bay
- Dunedin, from Dun Eideann, Scottish Gaelic for Edinburgh, and its suburbs listed below. Many of the city's central streets (such as Princes Street and Moray Place) are named after equivalent streets in Edinburgh.
  - Abbotsford
  - Balmacewen
  - Belleknowes
  - Burnside
  - Calton Hill
  - Corstorphine
  - Dalkeith
  - Dalmore
  - The Glen
  - Glenleith
  - Glenross
  - Grants Braes
  - Helensburgh, New Zealand
  - Kenmure
  - Little Paisley
  - Macandrew Bay
  - Maryhill
  - Musselburgh
  - Port Chalmers
  - Portobello
  - Roseneath, Otago
  - Roslyn
  - Saint Clair
  - Saint Kilda
  - Shiel Hill
  - Waverley
- Dunstan Range (mountains)
- Duntroon
- Eglinton River
- Ettrick
- Eyre Mountains
- Fairlie, New Zealand
- Forsyth Island, New Zealand
- Fortrose
- Gair Loch on Seaforth River
- Galloway, New Zealand
- Garvie Mountains
- Glenavy
- Glenburn, New Zealand
- Glencoe, New Zealand
- Glendhu Bay
- Glenorchy
- Glentaki - a hybrid name for the valley of the Waitaki River
- Glentanner
- Glentunnel
- The Grampians (mountains)
- Inch Clutha (Meaning Clyde Island)
- Kelso
- Kinloch
- Kirkliston Range
- Kyeburn (=River/stream of the cows)
- Lake Aviemore
- Lake Benmore (Beinn Mor)
- Lake Dunstan
- Lake Forsyth
- Lake Innes
- Lake Roxburgh
- Lammerlaw Range (mountains)
- Lammermoor Range (mountains)
- Lauder, New Zealand
- Lochmara Bay (Queen Charlotte Sound / Tōtaranui)
- Loch Katrine, near Lake Sumner
- Loch Maree, on Seaforth River
- Lochiel, New Zealand
- Luggate
- Lumsden
- Mackenzie Basin (James Mckenzie)
- Maclennan, New Zealand
- Maclennan Range (Catlins)
- Macraes Flat
- Methven, New Zealand
- Mosgiel
- Mossburn
- Mount Bruce
- Nevis Bluff
- Nevis River
- Ranfurly
- Renwick, New Zealand
- Roxburgh
- Saint Bathans, New Zealand (Abbey St Bathans)
- Seaforth River, named as in Loch Seaforth
- Soutra Hill
- Sutherland Falls (waterfall)
- Water of Leith (river)
- Wedderburn, New Zealand

== Stewart Island (Rakiura) ==
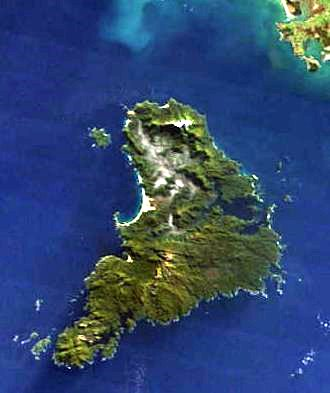
Satellite image of Stewart Island / Rakiura

- Stewart Island
- Oban, largest settlement in Stewart Island
- Paterson Inlet
- Ulva Island
- The Snares (not a Scottish name)
  - Broughton Island

== Auckland Islands ==
- Ewing Island
- Port Ross
- Campbell Island

== See also ==
- Scottish New Zealander

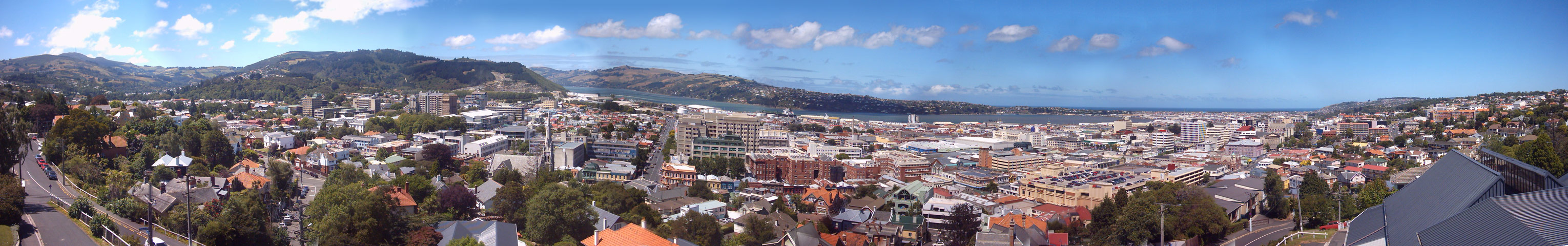
180° view of Dunedin, shot from the hills on the west. Mount Cargill is at the extreme left of picture, and the Otago Peninsula is beyond the harbour to the centre.
