= List of marae in Southland Region =

This is a list of marae (Māori meeting grounds) in Southland, New Zealand.

In October 2020, the Government committed $718,576 from the Provincial Growth Fund to upgrade two marae in the region, with the intention of creating 25 jobs.

== Southland District ==
Marae name	Wharenui name	Iwi and hapū	Location
Takutai o te Titi	Takutai o te Titi	Ngāi Tahu (Ōraka-Aparima Rūnanga)	Riverton

== Invercargill City ==
Marae name	Wharenui name	Iwi and hapū	Location
Te Rau Aroha	Tahu Potiki	Ngāi Tahu (Awarua Rūnanga)	Bluff
Murihiku Marae	Te Rakitauneke	Ngāi Tahu (Waihōpai Rūnanga)	Invercargill

== Gore District ==
Marae name	Wharenui name	Iwi and hapū	Location
O Te Ika Rama	O Te Ika Rama	Ngāi Tahu (Hokonui Rūnanga)	Gore
Mataura Marae	Mataura Wharenui	Ngāi Tahu	Mataura

== See also ==
- Lists of marae in New Zealand
- List of schools in Southland, New Zealand
