= Heidelberg, New Zealand =

Heidelberg
- Suburb
- Interactive map of Heidelberg
- Coordinates: 46°25.75′S 168°22.75′E
- Country: New Zealand
- City: Invercargill City
- Local authority: Invercargill City Council

Area
  - Land: 131 ha (320 acres)

Population (June 2025)
  - Total: 2,280
  - Density: 1,740/km^{2} (4,510/sq mi)

Georgetown	Newfield
Strathern	Heidelberg	Rockdale
Kingswell		Tisbury

Heidelberg is a suburb of the southern New Zealand city of Invercargill. It is located to the southeast of the city centre.

The area was called Conyerstown by its first European owner, Thomas Agnew. He sold the land to settlers Joseph and Martin Metzger, who were both connected to Heidelberg in Germany.

Notable features of the predominantly residential suburb include Elizabeth Park, a secondary school (Aurora College), and one of the city's main marae, Murihiku Marae. The suburb is roughly bounded by Regent Street in the east, Pomona Street in the west, and Centre Street and Tramway Road in the north and south, respectively.

Murihiku Marae is located in Heidelberg. It is a marae (meeting ground) of the Waihōpai Rūnanga branch of Ngāi Tahu, and includes Te Rakitauneke wharenui (meeting house).

== Demographics ==
Heidelberg covers 1.31 km^{2} (0.51 sq mi) and had an estimated population of 2,280 as of June 2025, with a population density of 1,740 people per km^{2}.

Historical population
Year	Pop.	±% p.a.
2006	2,460	—
2013	2,547	+0.50%
2018	2,601	+0.42%

Before the 2023 census, Heidelberg had a larger boundary, covering 1.68 km^{2} (0.65 sq mi). Using that boundary, Heidelberg had a population of 2,601 at the 2018 New Zealand census, an increase of 54 people (2.1%) since the 2013 census, and an increase of 141 people (5.7%) since the 2006 census. There were 957 households, comprising 1,230 males and 1,377 females, giving a sex ratio of 0.89 males per female, with 621 people (23.9%) aged under 15 years, 516 (19.8%) aged 15 to 29, 1,041 (40.0%) aged 30 to 64, and 426 (16.4%) aged 65 or older.

Ethnicities were 78.7% European/Pākehā, 25.7% Māori, 8.0% Pasifika, 4.7% Asian, and 1.6% other ethnicities. People may identify with more than one ethnicity.

The percentage of people born overseas was 10.1, compared with 27.1% nationally.

Although some people chose not to answer the census's question about religious affiliation, 54.0% had no religion, 33.4% were Christian, 1.4% had Māori religious beliefs, 0.7% were Hindu, 0.3% were Muslim, 0.1% were Buddhist and 1.3% had other religions.

Of those at least 15 years old, 171 (8.6%) people had a bachelor's or higher degree, and 612 (30.9%) people had no formal qualifications. 132 people (6.7%) earned over $70,000 compared to 17.2% nationally. The employment status of those at least 15 was that 957 (48.3%) people were employed full-time, 264 (13.3%) were part-time, and 105 (5.3%) were unemployed.

Individual statistical areas (2018 boundaries)
Name	Area (km^{2})	Population	Density (per km^{2})	Households	Median age	Median income
Elizabeth Park	1.03	1,272	1,235	456	38.1 years	$24,300
Aurora	0.65	1,329	2,045	501	30.9 years	$29,000
New Zealand					37.4 years	$31,800

== Education ==
Aurora College is a state secondary school for years 7 to 13 with a roll of 630 students as of March 2026. The school formed in 2005 from the merger of Mt Anglern College and Tweedsmuir Junior High School. Mt Anglern was formed from the merger of Kingswell and Cargill high schools in 1998.

St Patrick's School is a state-integrated Catholic primary school for years 1 to 6 with a roll of 267 students. It opened in 1944.
