= Mark Patterson (New Zealand politician) =

New Zealand politician

The Honourable Mark Patterson MP
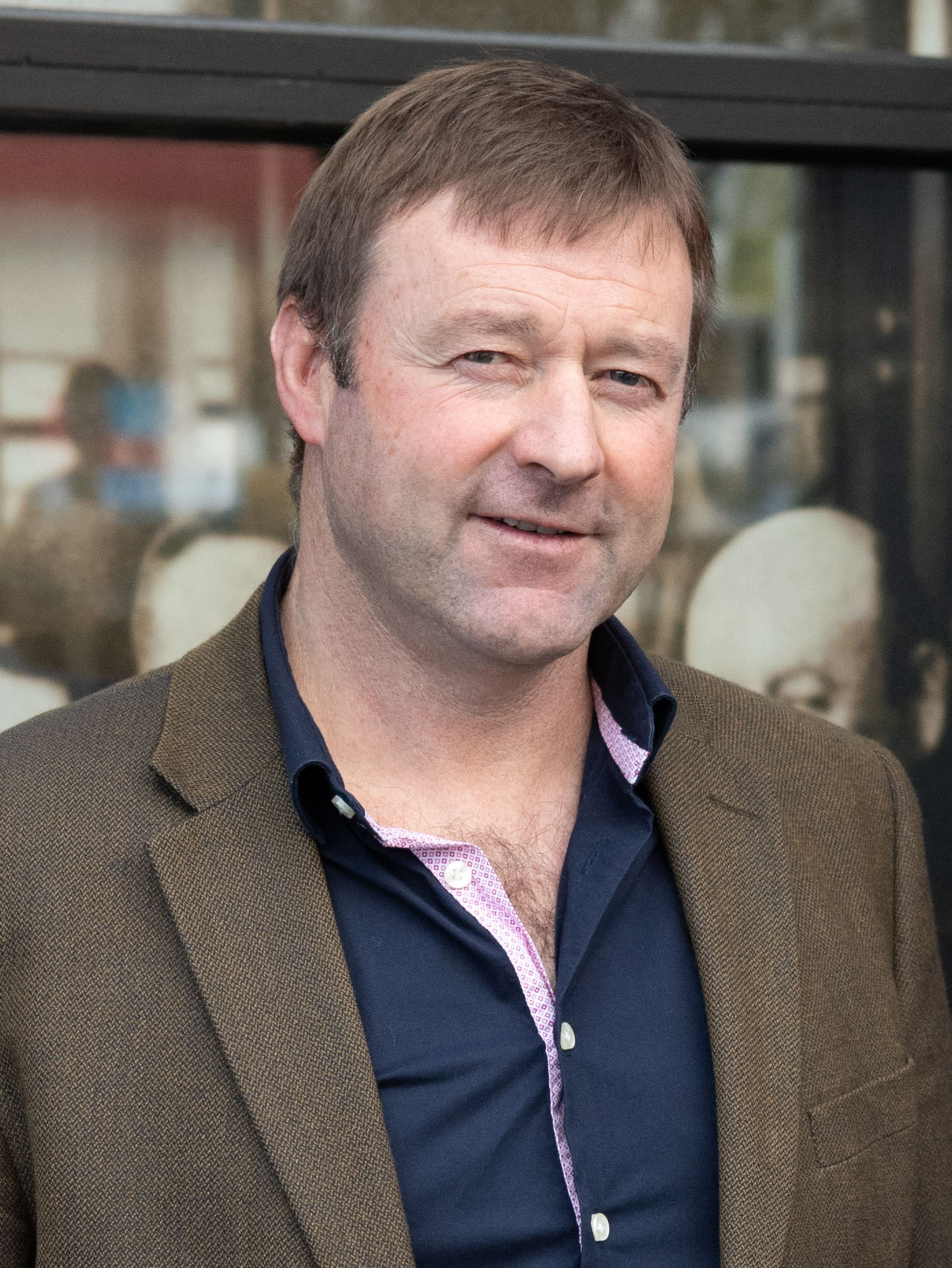
- Patterson in 2019

Member of the New Zealand Parliament for New Zealand First party list
- Incumbent
- Assumed office 14 October 2023
- In office 23 September 2017 – 17 October 2020

3rd Minister for Rural Communities
- Incumbent
- Assumed office 27 November 2023
- Prime Minister: Christopher Luxon
- Preceded by: Kieran McAnulty

Personal details
- Born: Mark William James Patterson; 1970 (age 55–56)
- Party: New Zealand First (2015–present)
- Other political affiliations: National (2007–2015)

Mark William James Patterson MP (born 1970) is a New Zealand farmer, lobbyist and politician. He is a Member of Parliament in the House of Representatives for the New Zealand First party.

Since 2023, he has served as Minister for Rural Communities and Associate Minister for Agriculture in the Sixth National Government of New Zealand.

== Early life and career ==
Patterson was born in Canterbury and raised with his three sisters on his family's farm at Southbridge. His ancestors arrived in New Zealand in the 1860s and had owned the family farm since 1905. In the 1990s, Patterson was a pupil at Ellesmere College, where future National Party MP Gerry Brownlee was his woodwork teacher.

Patterson moved to work on a sheep and cattle farm near Oamaru in 2004. With his wife, Jude Howell Patterson, he purchased a 500-hectare sheep farm in Lawrence, Otago, in 2008. The couple have two daughters together. Patterson and his wife are directors of Ngapara Farms Limited, a sheep and beef farming and forestry company.

Patterson was involved in the reform of the meat industry. He was deputy chair of the Meat Industry Excellence Group, a red meat lobby group, in 2014 and 2015. Patterson was a vocal advocate for a failed merger between the two major co-operatives, Silver Fern Farms and Alliance Group, and was critical of Silver Fern Farms' joint venture with Bright Food subsidiary Shanghai Maling Aquarius Ltd. Patterson's lobbying against the deal was characterised as being "anti-Chinese." In 2017, he criticised the sale of the Jericho Station farm at Manapouri to Chinese ownership, stating that New Zealand citizenship should be a requirement to purchase New Zealand land.

After losing his re-election bid in 2020, Patterson returned to his farm in Lawrence. He was chair of the Otago branch of Federated Farmers from 2021 until 2023.

== Early political career ==
Patterson was previously involved with the National Party and unsuccessfully contested the nomination for the Clutha-Southland electorate in 2014 upon Bill English's decision to become a List MP, but lost to Todd Barclay. He joined New Zealand First after Winston Peters won the Northland by-election for New Zealand First in 2015, saying that he supported New Zealand First's new rural focus.

== Member of Parliament ==
=== First term, 2017–2020 ===
New Zealand Parliament
Years	Term	Electorate	List	Party
2017–2020	52nd	List	7	NZ First
2023–2026	54th	List	4	NZ First
2026–present	55th	List	4	NZ First

In the 2017 election Patterson stood for New Zealand First in the Clutha-Southland electorate and was placed 7 on the New Zealand First party list. He duly entered parliament via the party list. He was the only South-Island based MP in his party.

In his first term, Patterson served as a member on both the education and workforce, and primary production committees. He was also the New Zealand First spokesperson for agriculture and primary industries, biosecurity, Christchurch earthquake recovery, Crown minerals, customs, food safety, intellectual property, and land information.

As agriculture spokesperson, Patterson was critical of the proposed sale of Westland Milk to the China-based Yili Group. The purchase went ahead in 2023. He criticised Air New Zealand for using plant-based meats on some of its flights and congratulated Virgin Australia on announcing it was searching for a New Zealand-based red meat supplier for its trans-Tasman flights.

Patterson sponsored three bills in his first parliamentary term, the New Zealand Superannuation and Retirement Income (Fair Residency) Amendment Bill, the Gore District Council (Otama Rural Water Supply) Bill, and the Farm Debt Mediation Bill.

Patterson's superannuation bill was introduced in October 2018; it proposed doubling the minimum residency qualification for New Zealand Superannuation from 10 years to 20 years after age 20. The bill had not been reported out of select committee when Patterson was defeated in the 2020 general election; the bill transferred to National MP Andrew Bayly and passed into law on 14 November 2021. In a speech on the bill, Patterson said the intent was to limit recent immigrants and New Zealanders who had spent the majority of their lives overseas from claiming New Zealand superannuation.

The Otama Rural Water Supply bill, on behalf of Gore District Council, transferred the ownership of the rural water supply scheme in Otama, Southland from the council to a private company. It passed in May 2019. The Farm Debt Mediation Bill was introduced in May 2018 and progressed to select committee, but was withdrawn in favour of a similar bill backed by the Government that was enacted in 2019.

In conscience votes on legislation, Patterson voted in favour of the End of Life Choice Bill and supported Jenny Marcroft's amendment to require the bill's passage to be contingent on a nationwide referendum. He voted in favour of the Abortion Legislation Bill at its first and second readings, but removed his support for the bill at its third reading after Parliament rejected a bid for that bill to also be decided by referendum.

Patterson was announced as the New Zealand First candidate for the newly formed Taieri electorate for the 2020 general election and was ranked at 7 on the New Zealand First party list. During the 2020 general election held on 17 October, Patterson finished fourth in Taieri. He and his fellow New Zealand First MPs lost their seats after the party's vote dropped to 2.7%, below the five percent threshold needed to remain in Parliament.

=== Second term, 2023–2026 ===
Patterson was ranked fourth on New Zealand First's party list for the 2023 general election and re-contested the Taieri electorate. Patterson finished fourth in Taieri, gaining 3,069 votes. New Zealand First reentered Parliament, with 6.08% of the popular vote and eight seats; Patterson was re-elected as a list MP. He said he was motivated to return to Parliament in protest of the Labour Government's environment and agriculture policies.

Following the formation of the National-led coalition government, Patterson was appointed Minister for Rural Communities and Associate Minister of Agriculture in late November 2023. He was additionally appointed Associate Minister for Regional Development in January 2024. Patterson has delegated responsibility for the wool industry. He launched the government's "woolshed roadshow" in 2024. In 2025, he announced that government buildings would be required to use wool products, rather than synthetic fibres, in construction and refurbishment. Due to a pecuniary interest and potential conflict, Patterson stood aside from decisions related to Emissions Trading Scheme (ETS) settings, but not before taking part in ETS decisions in May 2024.

In late February 2025, the Ministry for Primary Industries stopped sending staff to Patterson's office after complaints from staff. While the complaints were not directly about Patterson, their nature remained undisclosed for privacy reasons.

As Associate Minister of Regional Development, Patterson announced on 7 April 2026 that the Government would loan NZ$18.13 million from the Regional Infrastructure Fund to support pre-construction work for the Tukituki Water Restoration Project. The proposed 104 million cubic square dam is intended to support agricultural and horticultural production in the Hawke's Bay region.

In mid-April 2026, Patterson visited South Dunedin's Surrey Street and met with members of the Surrey Street Flood Action Group including convener Lynne Newell, Julian Doorey and Neil Johnstone. He described the Dunedin City Council's flood prevention work in the areas as "too little, too late" and proposed the use of funds from the Government's Regional Development Fund for flood mitigation work including the redevelopment of the former Forbury Park Raceway. Patterson also met with Mayor of Dunedin Sophie Barker and other DCC councillors to discuss government funding for flood prevention in Dunedin. Barker and DCC councillor Brent Weatherall defended the Council's flood prevention work in South Dunedin while emphasising the need for more central government support.

=== Third term, 2026–present ===
During the 2026 New Zealand general election scheduled for 7 November, Patterson contested the Taieri electorate for New Zealand First. He was ranked fourth place on NZ First's party list. Based on preliminary results, Patterson came third place in the Taieri contest, gaining 4,595 votes. He was re-elected to Parliament on the NZ First party list.
