= Waianiwa =

- Interactive map of Waianiwa
- Coordinates: 46.295°S 168.251°E
- Country: New Zealand
- Region: Southland region
- Territorial authorities of New Zealand: Southland District
- Ward: Oreti Ward
- Community: Oreti Community
- Electorates: Invercargill; Te Tai Tonga (Māori)

Government
  - Territorial authority: Southland District Council
  - Regional council: Southland Regional Council
  - Mayor of Southland: Rob Scott
  - Invercargill MP: Penny Simmonds
  - Te Tai Tonga MP: Tākuta Ferris
- Time zone: UTC+12 (NZST)
  - Summer (DST): UTC+13 (NZDT)

Waianiwa is a town and statistical area in the Southland region of the South Island of New Zealand.

== Demographics ==
Waianiwa statistical area covers 228.65 km^{2} (88.28 sq mi) and had an estimated population of 1,270 as of June 2025, with a population density of 5.6 people per km^{2}.

Historical population
Year	Pop.	±% p.a.
2006	1,038	—
2013	1,155	+1.54%
2018	1,170	+0.26%

The statistical area had a population of 1,170 at the 2018 New Zealand census, an increase of 15 people (1.3%) since the 2013 census, and an increase of 132 people (12.7%) since the 2006 census. There were 417 households, comprising 600 males and 570 females, giving a sex ratio of 1.05 males per female. The median age was 36.3 years (compared with 37.4 years nationally), with 276 people (23.6%) aged under 15 years, 210 (17.9%) aged 15 to 29, 588 (50.3%) aged 30 to 64, and 96 (8.2%) aged 65 or older.

Ethnicities were 84.6% European/Pākehā, 8.5% Māori, 0.5% Pasifika, 11.5% Asian, and 2.1% other ethnicities. People may identify with more than one ethnicity.

The percentage of people born overseas was 17.7, compared with 27.1% nationally.

Although some people chose not to answer the census's question about religious affiliation, 47.7% had no religion, 42.6% were Christian, 0.3% had Māori religious beliefs, 1.0% were Hindu, 0.5% were Buddhist and 1.3% had other religions.

Of those at least 15 years old, 147 (16.4%) people had a bachelor's or higher degree, and 162 (18.1%) people had no formal qualifications. The median income was $42,000, compared with $31,800 nationally. 171 people (19.1%) earned over $70,000 compared to 17.2% nationally. The employment status of those at least 15 was that 564 (63.1%) people were employed full-time, 165 (18.5%) were part-time, and 15 (1.7%) were unemployed.

== Education ==
Waianiwa School is a state full primary school for years 1 to 8 with a roll of 57 as of July 2026. The school first opened in 1863.
