= Isla Bank =

- Interactive map of Isla Bank
- Coordinates: 46.20781006°S 168.12845280°E
- Country: New Zealand
- Region: Southland
- District: Southland District
- Ward: Waiau Aparima

Government
  - Territorial Authority: Southland District Council
  - Regional council: Southland Regional Council

Isla Bank is a rural community in the Southland District and Southland Region of New Zealand, on the Winton riding and Aparima riding.

It is part of Southland District Council's Waiau Aparima Ward.

== History ==
European settlers arrived in the area in the 19th century. By 1905, the area, which included the Limestone Plains and the main settlement of Calcium, had a population of 294.

== Education ==
Isla Bank School was a state contributing primary school for years 1 to 8, which operated in the area from 1899 to 2018.
