= Hawthorndale =

- Suburb
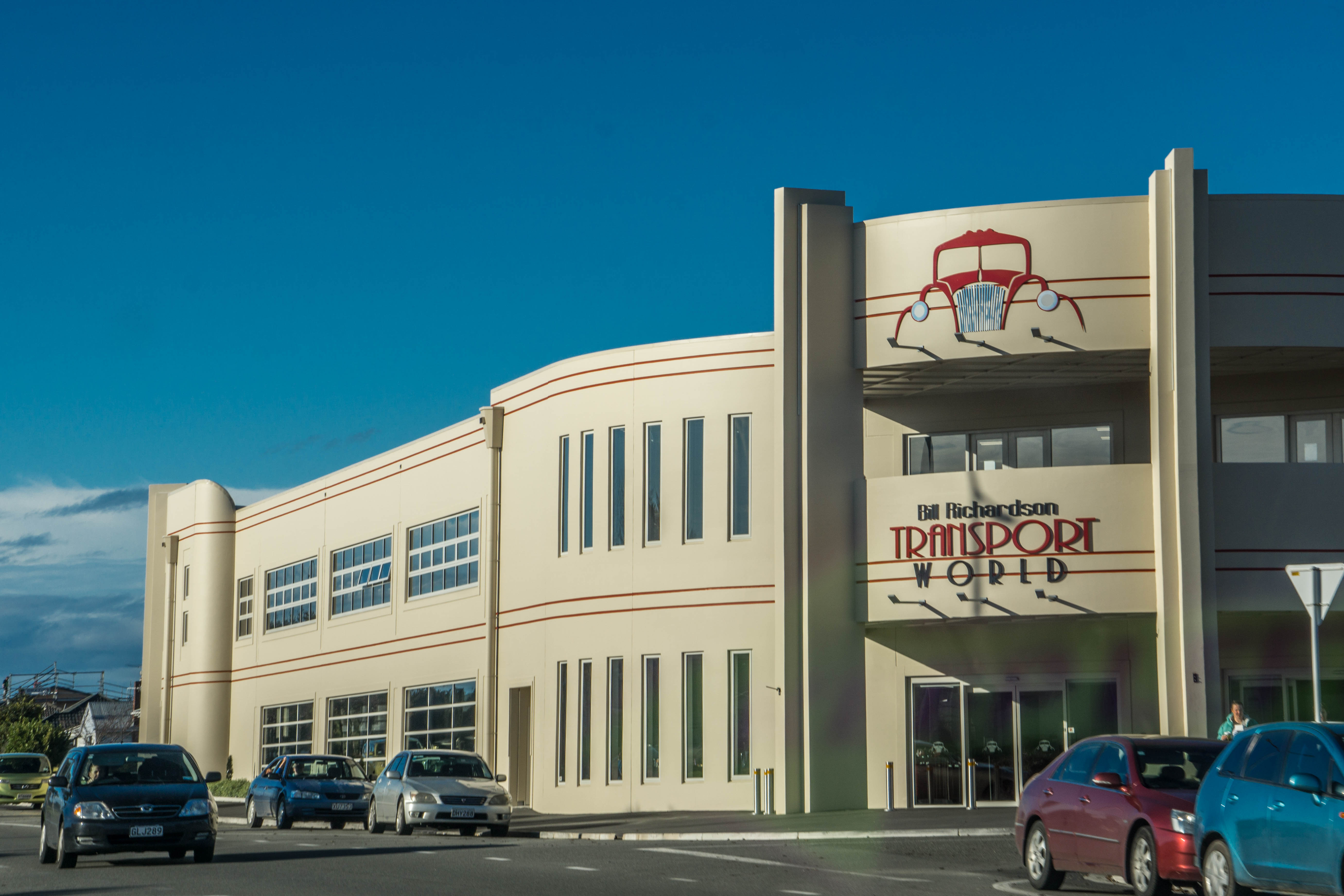
- Bill Richardson Transport World
- Interactive map of Hawthorndale
- Coordinates: 46.4098°S 168.3882°E
- Country: New Zealand
- City: Invercargill
- Local authority: Invercargill City Council

Area
  - Land: 149 ha (370 acres)

Population (June 2025)
  - Total: 1,850
  - Density: 1,240/km^{2} (3,220/sq mi)

Richmond	Glengarry	Mill Road
Turnbull Thomson Park	Hawthorndale	Seaward Bush
Georgetown	Newfield	Rockdale

Hawthorndale is a suburb of New Zealand's southernmost city, Invercargill. It contains the city's Eastern Cemetery, and also Bill Richardson Transport World, a truck and classic car museum.

== Demographics ==
The suburb is part of the Turnbull Thompson Park statistical area, which covers 1.49 km^{2} (0.58 sq mi) and had an estimated population of 1,850 as of June 2025, with a population density of 1,242 people per km^{2}. The statistical area is (incorrectly) named after Turnbull Thomson Park, in the south of the suburb.

Historical population
Year	Pop.	±% p.a.
2006	1,725	—
2013	1,731	+0.05%
2018	1,764	+0.38%

The statistical area had a population of 1,764 at the 2018 New Zealand census, an increase of 33 people (1.9%) since the 2013 census, and an increase of 39 people (2.3%) since the 2006 census. There were 696 households, comprising 828 males and 933 females, giving a sex ratio of 0.89 males per female. The median age was 35.3 years (compared with 37.4 years nationally), with 336 people (19.0%) aged under 15 years, 396 (22.4%) aged 15 to 29, 813 (46.1%) aged 30 to 64, and 216 (12.2%) aged 65 or older.

Ethnicities were 85.5% European/Pākehā, 17.2% Māori, 3.4% Pasifika, 6.3% Asian, and 1.7% other ethnicities. People may identify with more than one ethnicity.

The percentage of people born overseas was 10.4, compared with 27.1% nationally.

Although some people chose not to answer the census's question about religious affiliation, 50.9% had no religion, 36.4% were Christian, 0.9% had Māori religious beliefs, 0.9% were Hindu, 0.5% were Muslim, 0.2% were Buddhist and 2.0% had other religions.

Of those at least 15 years old, 198 (13.9%) people had a bachelor's or higher degree, and 336 (23.5%) people had no formal qualifications. The median income was $34,000, compared with $31,800 nationally. 204 people (14.3%) earned over $70,000 compared to 17.2% nationally. The employment status of those at least 15 was that 822 (57.6%) people were employed full-time, 204 (14.3%) were part-time, and 45 (3.2%) were unemployed.

== Education ==
Ascot Community School is a full primary school serving years 1 to 8 with a roll of 213 students as of March 2026. The school was established in 1999 through the merger of three pre-existing schools:

- Surrey Park School, a primary school founded in 1940.
- Hawthorndale School, a primary school founded in 1958.
- Lithgow Intermediate School, an intermediate school founded in 1965 which had been amalgamated with Cargill High School in 1997 and 1998.
