= Kaiwera =

- Town
- Interactive map of Kaiwera
- Coordinates: 46.169°S 169.097°E
- Country: New Zealand
- Region: Southland
- District: Gore District
- Ward: Kaiwera-Waimumu Ward

Government
  - Territorial Authority: Gore District Council
  - Regional council: Southland Regional Council

Kaiwera is a rural settlement and community in Southland, New Zealand.

It includes Nithdale Station, a beef, dairy, sheep and forestry farm, with a Romney and Suffolk Stud. It accommodates visitors with a self-contained homestead and farm tours.

Kaiwera Downs Wind Farm is located south-west of Kaiwera.

Kaiwera is part of the wider Waimumu-Kaiwera statistical area.

== History ==
Kaiwera School opened about 1879.

By 1907, the local community was holding an annual picnic and sports day at the settlement.

In 1924, Charles Tripp (a grandson of the runholder Charles Tripp) took over the Nithdale Station farm. He converted the rundown 1,478 hectare property, dominated by gorse and rabbits, into a productive farm, which he worked until his death in 1991. Andrew and Heather Tripp has farmed the property since then.

In 2015, a person was killed in a farm accident in Kaiwera.

== Education ==
Kaiwera School operated 1879 and 2009. An 1888 inspector's report found the school's performance was "very creditable in the face of the very poor attendance made by many of the pupils". The school's board of trustees said it was unable to attract enough families to remain open in 2009, and the eight remaining students relocated to Gore Main School and St Mary's School.
