= Heddon Bush =

- Interactive map of Heddon Bush
- Coordinates: 46.07803310°S 168.15254140°E
- Country: New Zealand
- Region: Southland
- District: Southland District
- Ward: Waiau Aparima

Government
  - Territorial Authority: Southland District Council
  - Regional council: Southland Regional Council

Heddon Bush is a rural community in the Southland District and Southland Region of New Zealand.

The community is about 15 minutes' drive from Winton. It is part of Southland District Council's Waiau Aparima Ward.

== Education ==
Heddon Bush School is a state contributing primary school for years 1 to 8 with a roll of 66 as of July 2026. It has three classrooms and a sheltered playground. It was established in 1881.
