= Knapdale, New Zealand =

Knapdale
- Interactive map of Knapdale
- Coordinates: 46.390186°S 168.7337479°E
- Country: New Zealand
- Region: Southland
- District: Gore District

Government
  - Territorial Authority: Gore District Council
  - Regional council: Southland Regional Council

Knapdale is a rural community in the Gore District and Southland Region of New Zealand.

== Education ==
Knapdale School is a state contributing primary school for years 1 to 8 with a roll of 53 as of July 2026. It was established in 1879.
