= Georgetown, Invercargill =

Georgetown
- Suburb
- Interactive map of Georgetown
- Coordinates: 46.4180°S 168.3729°E
- Country: New Zealand
- City: Invercargill
- Local authority: Invercargill City Council

Area
  - Land: 112 ha (280 acres)

Population (June 2025)
  - Total: 2,180
  - Density: 1,950/km^{2} (5,040/sq mi)

Invercargill Central	Turnbull Thomson Park	Hawthorndale
Appleby	Georgetown	Newfield
Kew	Strathern	Rockdale

Georgetown is a suburb of New Zealand's southernmost city, Invercargill.

== Demographics ==
Georgetown covers 1.12 km^{2} (0.43 sq mi) and had an estimated population of 2,180 as of June 2025, with a population density of 1,946 people per km^{2}.

Historical population
Year	Pop.	±% p.a.
2006	1,884	—
2013	1,935	+0.38%
2018	2,040	+1.06%

Georgetown had a population of 2,040 at the 2018 New Zealand census, an increase of 105 people (5.4%) since the 2013 census, and an increase of 156 people (8.3%) since the 2006 census. There were 828 households, comprising 1,008 males and 1,032 females, giving a sex ratio of 0.98 males per female. The median age was 35.2 years (compared with 37.4 years nationally), with 384 people (18.8%) aged under 15 years, 489 (24.0%) aged 15 to 29, 900 (44.1%) aged 30 to 64, and 267 (13.1%) aged 65 or older.

Ethnicities were 80.7% European/Pākehā, 22.4% Māori, 6.6% Pasifika, 6.8% Asian, and 1.6% other ethnicities. People may identify with more than one ethnicity.

The percentage of people born overseas was 14.0, compared with 27.1% nationally.

Although some people chose not to answer the census's question about religious affiliation, 52.6% had no religion, 34.0% were Christian, 1.0% had Māori religious beliefs, 0.6% were Hindu, 0.9% were Muslim, 0.4% were Buddhist and 2.5% had other religions.

Of those at least 15 years old, 198 (12.0%) people had a bachelor's or higher degree, and 456 (27.5%) people had no formal qualifications. The median income was $26,000, compared with $31,800 nationally. 117 people (7.1%) earned over $70,000 compared to 17.2% nationally. The employment status of those at least 15 was that 786 (47.5%) people were employed full-time, 258 (15.6%) were part-time, and 75 (4.5%) were unemployed.

== Education ==
Southland Girls' High School is a single-sex state school for years 7 to 13 with a roll of 1,122 students as of March 2026. The school was founded in 1879. From the 1880s to 1907 it shared a site with Southland Boys' High School and senior girls attended some classes at the boys' school. It moved to the current site in 1947.
