= Maitland, New Zealand =

Maitland
- Interactive map of Maitland
- Coordinates: 45.9948323°S 168.9339534°E
- Country: New Zealand
- Region: Southland
- District: Gore District

Government
  - Territorial Authority: Gore District Council
  - Regional council: Southland Regional Council

Maitland is a rural community in the Gore District and Southland Region of New Zealand.

== Education ==
Two schools historically operated in the area: Maitland School, established in 1896, and Waikaka Valley School, established by 1877.

The two schools merged in 1997 to form Willowbank School, which closed in 2016.
