= Glenham, New Zealand =

Glenham
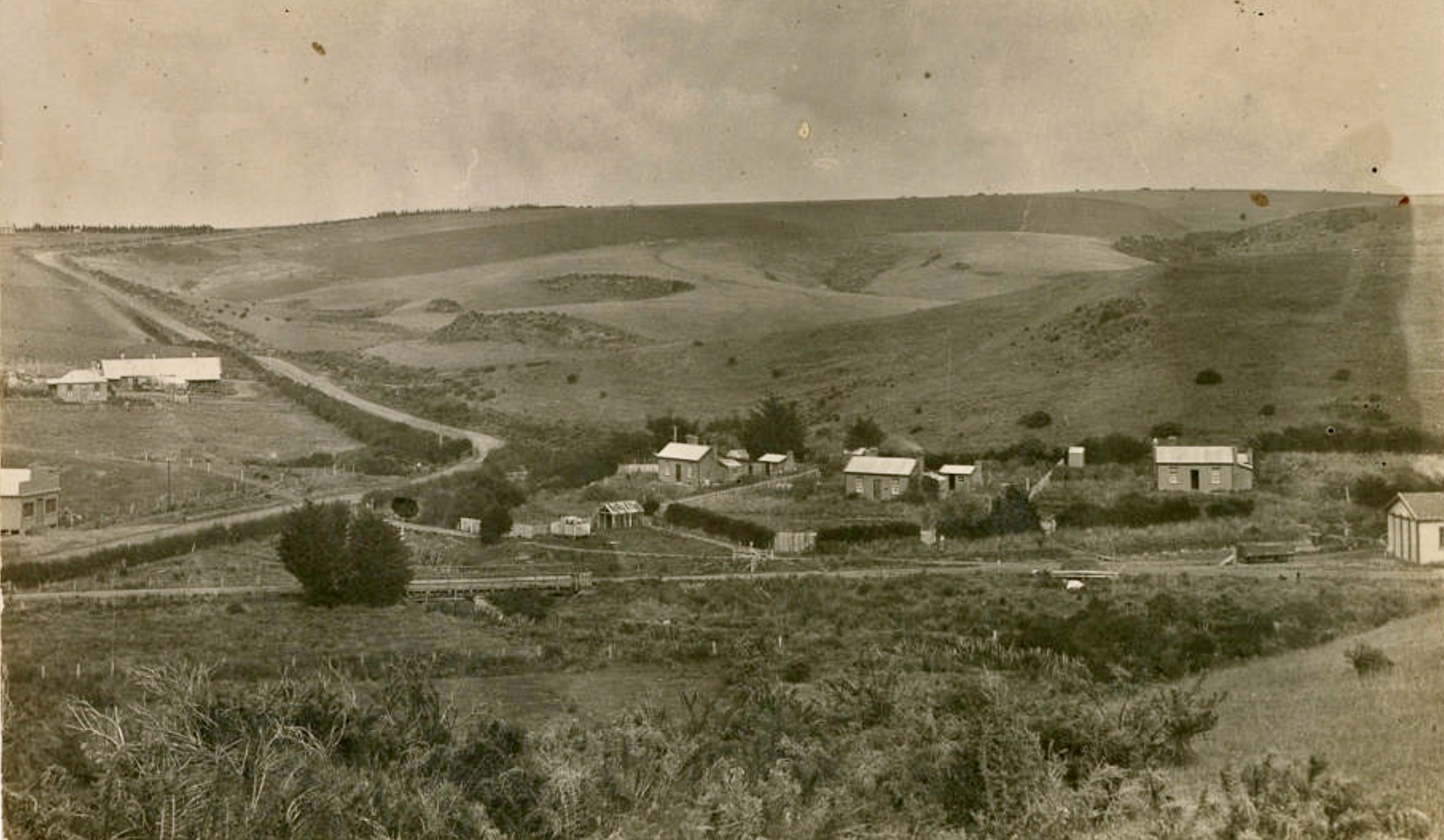
- Glenham in 1908. The end of the railway and part of the engine shed is on the extreme right, railway houses in the centre, the Glenham Sawmilling tramway (open 1909-1918) to Tyneholm in front of them, D. C. McKenzie's store on the extreme left and the dairy factory above it on Letterbox Rd
- Interactive map of Glenham
- Coordinates: 46.3651274°S 168.7013267°E
- Country: New Zealand
- Region: Southland
- District: Southland District
- Ward: Waihopai Toetoes

Government
  - Territorial Authority: Southland District Council
  - Regional council: Southland Regional Council

Glenham is a rural community in the Southland District and Southland Region of New Zealand.

It is part of Southland District Council's Waihopai Toetoes Ward.

Glenham was the terminus of the Wyndham branch railway from 1 May 1890 to 14 July 1930.

== Education ==
Glenham School was a state contributing primary school for years 1 to 6. It was established in 1899 and closed to students in 2023.
