= Gore District, New Zealand =

Gore District
- Territorial authority district
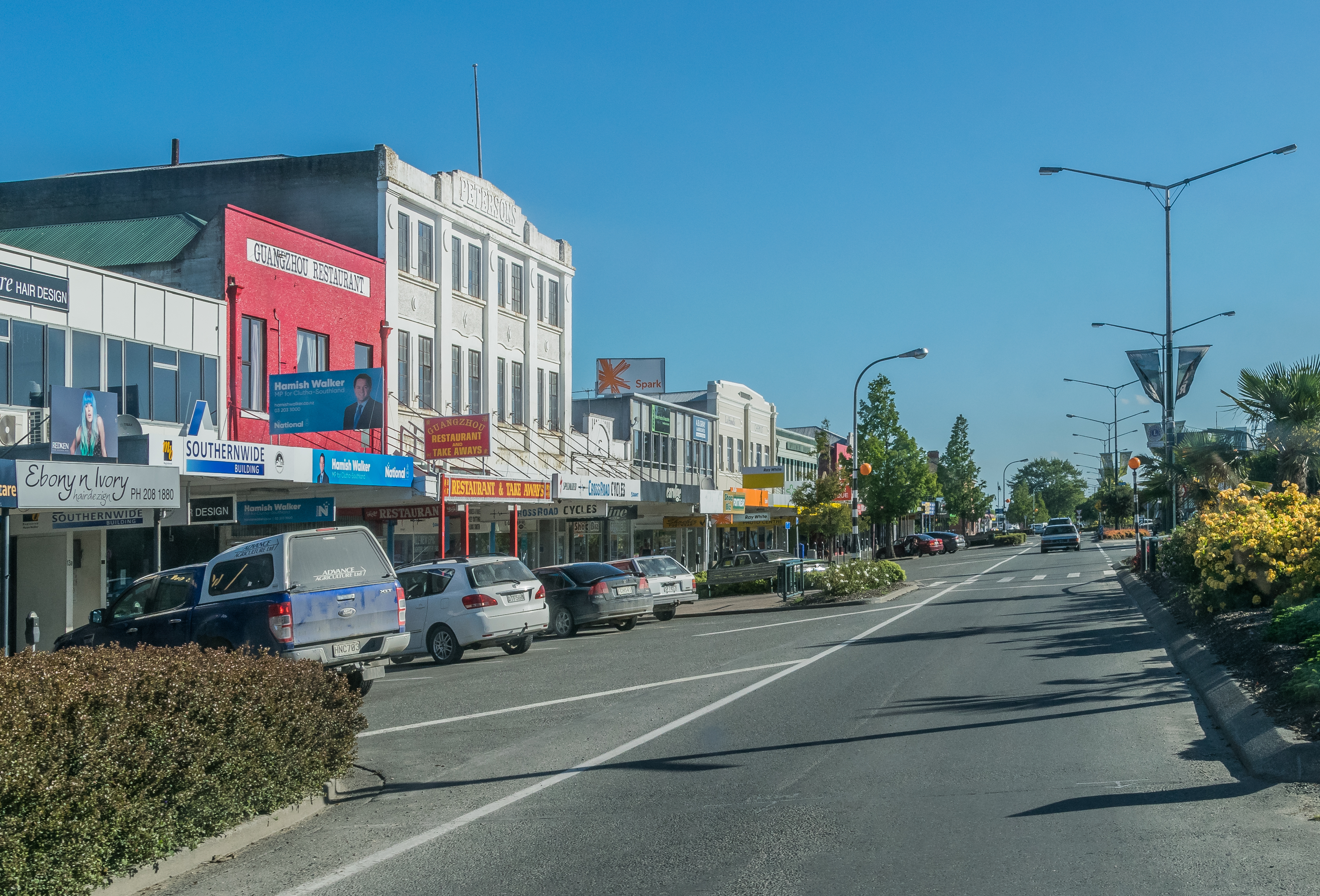
- Main Street in Gore

- Gore district in the South Island
- Coordinates: 46°02′42″S 169°00′22″E
- Country: New Zealand
- Region: Southland
- Wards: Gore; Mataura; Kaiwera-Waimumu; Waikaka
- Formed: 1989
- Seat: Gore

Government
  - Mayor: Ben Bell
  - Territorial authority: Gore District Council

Area
  - Total: 1,253.85 km^{2} (484.11 sq mi)

Population (June 2025)
  - Total: 12,950
  - Density: 10.33/km^{2} (26.75/sq mi)
- Time zone: UTC+12 (NZST)
  - Summer (DST): UTC+13 (NZDT)
- Postcode(s): Map of postcodes
- Website: www.goredc.govt.nz

Gore District is a district in the Southland Region of the South Island of New Zealand. It is named for Gore, the district's biggest township.

== Geography ==
The Gore District is located in the south of the South Island. The two neighbouring districts are Southland in the west and Clutha in the east. The district has a land area of 1,253.85 square kilometres (484.11 sq mi). The seat of the district council is in the town of Gore. The district has a population of 12,950 (June 2025)

=== Towns and localities ===
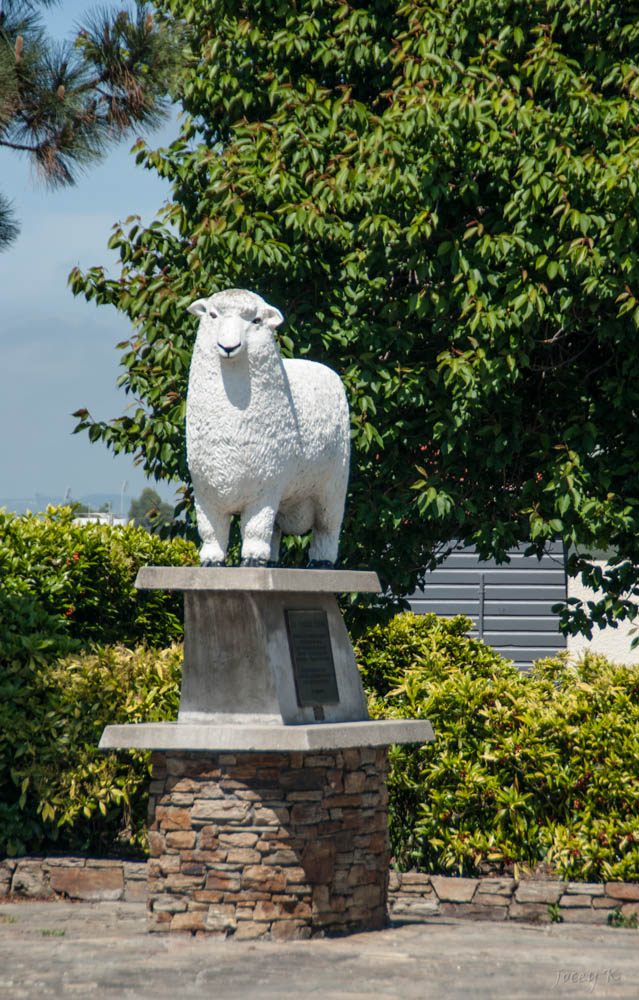
Romney ram statue in Gore

Gore is the main centre of Gore District. Other places in the district include the following, based on wards:

Gore Ward:

- Gore (seat)

Kaiwera-Waimumu Ward:

- Kaiwera Community Board:
  - Diamond Peak
  - East Gore
  - Ferndale
  - Kaiwera
  - Otaraia
  - Tuturau (north part)
  - Waikana
  - Watarikiki (east part)
- Waimumu Community Board:
  - Brydone (north part)
  - Charlton
  - Croydon
  - Croydon Bush
  - Otamita
  - Te Tipua (north part)
  - Upper Charlton
  - Waimumu
  - Waitane (east part)

Mataura Ward:

- Mataura

Waikaka Ward:

- Arthurton
- Benio
- Chatton
- Chatton North
- East Chatton
- Greenvale
- Knapdale
- Maitland
- Mandeville (south part)
- Merino Downs (west part)
- McNab
- Otama
- Otikerama
- Pukerau
- Te Kiteroa (west part)
- Waikaka
- Waikaka Valley
- Wendon (east part)
- Wendon Valley
- Whiterigg
- Willowbank

== Demographics ==
Gore District covers 1,253.85 km^{2} (484.11 sq mi) and had an estimated population of 12,950 as of June 2025, with a population density of 10 people per km^{2}.

Historical population
Year	Pop.	±% p.a.
2006	12,108	—
2013	12,033	−0.09%
2018	12,396	+0.60%
2023	12,711	+0.50%

Gore District had a population of 12,711 in the 2023 New Zealand census, an increase of 315 people (2.5%) since the 2018 census, and an increase of 678 people (5.6%) since the 2013 census. There were 6,324 males, 6,348 females and 39 people of other genders in 5,364 dwellings. 2.0% of people identified as LGBTIQ+. The median age was 42.8 years (compared with 38.1 years nationally). There were 2,304 people (18.1%) aged under 15 years, 2,148 (16.9%) aged 15 to 29, 5,541 (43.6%) aged 30 to 64, and 2,721 (21.4%) aged 65 or older.

People could identify as more than one ethnicity. The results were 86.9% European (Pākehā); 15.4% Māori; 2.1% Pasifika; 4.0% Asian; 0.4% Middle Eastern, Latin American and African New Zealanders (MELAA); and 3.4% other, which includes people giving their ethnicity as "New Zealander". English was spoken by 97.9%, Māori language by 3.1%, Samoan by 0.2% and other languages by 4.4%. No language could be spoken by 1.6% (e.g. too young to talk). New Zealand Sign Language was known by 0.4%. The percentage of people born overseas was 10.2, compared with 28.8% nationally.

Religious affiliations were 36.8% Christian, 0.6% Hindu, 0.3% Islam, 0.9% Māori religious beliefs, 0.3% Buddhist, 0.4% New Age, and 0.9% other religions. People who answered that they had no religion were 51.6%, and 8.4% of people did not answer the census question.

Of those at least 15 years old, 948 (9.1%) people had a bachelor's or higher degree, 5,943 (57.1%) had a post-high school certificate or diploma, and 3,249 (31.2%) people exclusively held high school qualifications. The median income was $39,300, compared with $41,500 nationally. 711 people (6.8%) earned over $100,000 compared to 12.1% nationally. The employment status of those at least 15 was that 5,424 (52.1%) people were employed full-time, 1,473 (14.2%) were part-time, and 204 (2.0%) were unemployed.

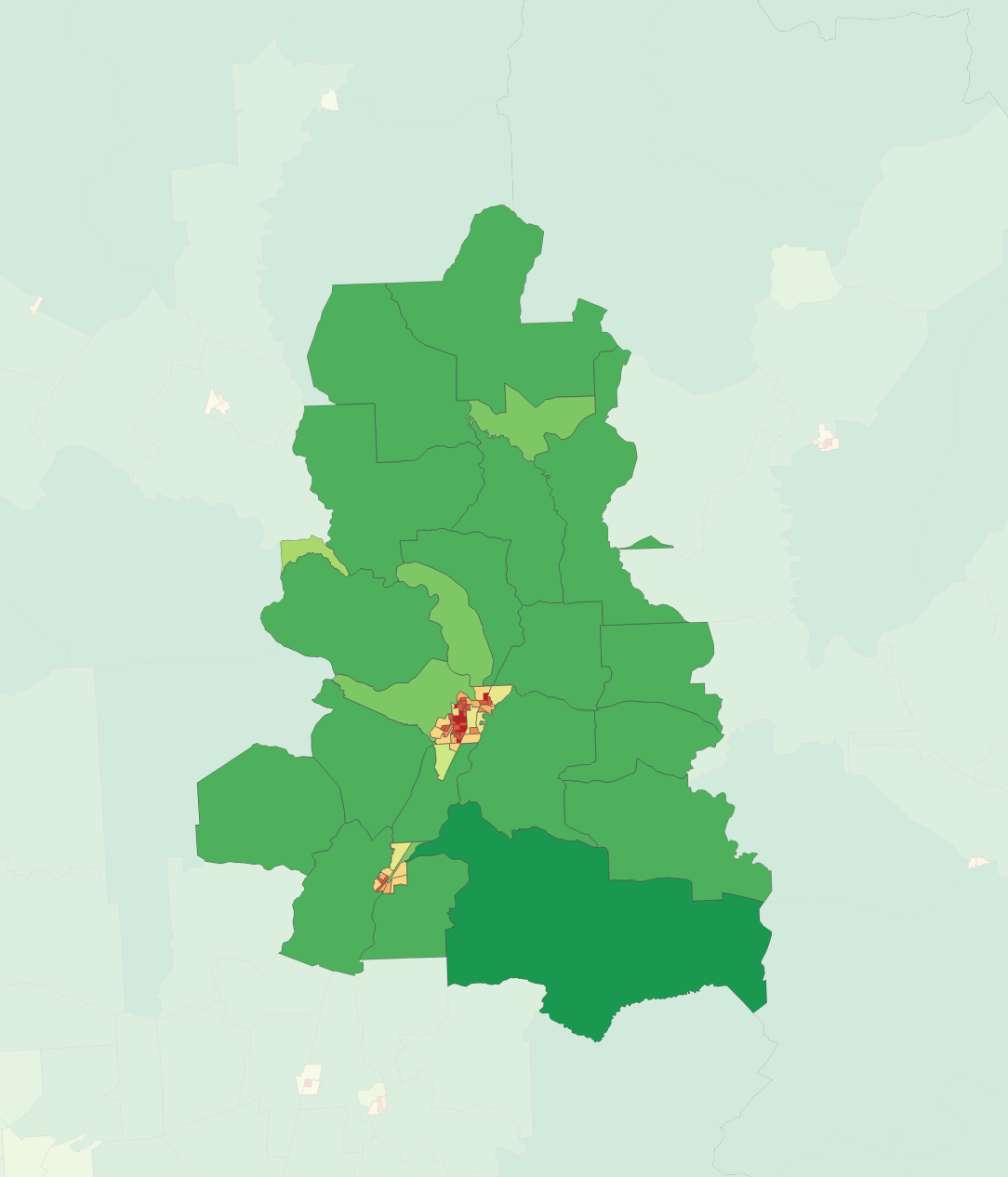
Population density in the 2023 census

Individual wards
Name	Area (km^{2})	Population	Density (per km^{2})	Dwellings	Median age	Median income
Waikaka Ward	586.75	1,536	2.6	594	39.2 years	$47,300
Kaiwera-Waimumu Ward	651.49	1,782	2.7	699	47.1 years	$44,900
Gore Ward	10.29	7,743	752.5	3,369	43.0 years	$37,900
Mataura Ward	5.32	1,650	310.2	702	40.5 years	$36,300
New Zealand					38.1 years	$41,500

== History ==
The European history of Gore started in 1855 with the arrival of Scottish settlers. After the town site was surveyed, the provincial superintendent, James Alexander Robertson Menzies, named the site for his friend, the Governor of New Zealand, Thomas Gore Browne. The original name of the township, Long Ford or Longford, remained for some time, but when the railway reached the town, the shorter name became common and was also applied to the wider district. The township of Gore was incorporated and became a borough council in 1885.

In the local government reform in 1989, the Gore and Mataura borough councils and parts of Southland County Council were amalgamated to form Gore District.

== Governance ==
The district council is headed by a mayor who is elected at large and complemented by eleven councillors from various wards. Five councillors represent the Gore ward, one councillor each represents the Mataura, Kaiwera-Waimumu, and Waikaka wards, and there is one further district-wide ward that is represented by three councillors. The current mayor, Ben Bell, was elected in the 2022 New Zealand local elections as Gore's youngest mayor at the age of 23 years, defeating the incumbent Tracy Hicks.

=== Elected members ===
==== 2025–2028 term ====
Councillors for the 2025–2028 term are:

- Mayor: Ben Bell
- District-wide ward: Joe Stringer (deputy mayor), Torrone Smith, Neville Phillips
- Gore ward: Mel Cupit, Paul McPhail, Andy Fraser, Robert McKenzie, Donna Bruce
- Gore rural ward: John Gardyne, Stewart MacDonell
- Mataura ward: Nicky Coats

==== 2022–2025 term ====
The council members for the 2022–2025 term were:

- Mayor: Ben Bell
- District-wide ward: Keith Hovell (deputy mayor), Richard McPhail, Joe Stringer
- Gore ward: Bret Highsted, Bronwyn Reid, Paul McPhail, Glenys Dickson, Robert McKenzie
- Mataura ward: Neville Phillips
- Waikaka ward: John Gardyne
- Waimumu-Kaiwera ward: Stewart MacDonell
