= Lochiel, New Zealand =

Lochiel
- Interactive map of Lochiel
- Coordinates: 46.20411893°S 168.33331940°E
- Country: New Zealand
- Region: Southland
- District: Southland District
- Ward: Oreti

Government
  - Territorial Authority: Southland District Council
  - Regional council: Southland Regional Council

Lochiel is a rural community in the Southland District and Southland Region of New Zealand.

It is part of Southland District Council's Oreti Ward.

== Education ==
Lochiel School is a state contributing primary school for years 1 to 6 with a roll of 77 as of July 2026. It was established in 1879.
