= Seaward Downs =

- Interactive map of Seaward Downs
- Coordinates: 46.390186°S 168.7337479°E
- Country: New Zealand
- Region: Southland
- District: Southland District
- Ward: Oreti

Government
  - Territorial Authority: Southland District Council
  - Regional council: Southland Regional Council

Seaward Downs is a rural community in the Southland District and Southland Region of New Zealand.

It is part of Southland District Council's Oreti Ward.

== Education ==
Seaward Downs School was a state contributing primary school for years 1 to 8 which operated in the area from 1891 to 1975.
