= Strathern, New Zealand =

Strathern
- Suburb
- Interactive map of Strathern
- Coordinates: 46.428°S 168.369°E
- Country: New Zealand
- City: Invercargill
- Local authority: Invercargill City Council

Area
  - Land: 177 ha (440 acres)

Population (June 2025)
  - Total: 4,110
  - Density: 2,320/km^{2} (6,010/sq mi)

	Georgetown	Newfield
Appleby	Strathern	Heidelberg
Kew	Kingswell	Tisbury

Strathern is a suburb of New Zealand's southernmost city, Invercargill.

== Demographics ==
Strathern covers 1.77 km^{2} (0.68 sq mi) and had an estimated population of 4,110 as of June 2025, with a population density of 2,322 people per km^{2}.

Historical population
Year	Pop.	±% p.a.
2006	2,181	—
2013	2,088	−0.62%
2018	2,217	+1.21%

Before the 2023 census, Strathern had a smaller boundary, covering 0.98 km^{2} (0.38 sq mi). Under that boundary, Strathern had had a population of 2,217 at the 2018 New Zealand census, an increase of 129 people (6.2%) since the 2013 census, and an increase of 36 people (1.7%) since the 2006 census. There were 951 households, comprising 1,056 males and 1,164 females, giving a sex ratio of 0.91 males per female. The median age was 37.4 years (compared with 37.4 years nationally), with 423 people (19.1%) aged under 15 years, 465 (21.0%) aged 15 to 29, 948 (42.8%) aged 30 to 64, and 384 (17.3%) aged 65 or older.

Ethnicities were 85.1% European/Pākehā, 20.6% Māori, 6.4% Pasifika, 4.2% Asian, and 1.9% other ethnicities. People may identify with more than one ethnicity.

The percentage of people born overseas was 10.7, compared with 27.1% nationally.

Although some people chose not to answer the census's question about religious affiliation, 51.3% had no religion, 34.9% were Christian, 0.8% had Māori religious beliefs, 0.8% were Hindu, 0.1% were Muslim, 0.4% were Buddhist and 2.0% had other religions.

Of those at least 15 years old, 171 (9.5%) people had a bachelor's or higher degree, and 537 (29.9%) people had no formal qualifications. The median income was $26,300, compared with $31,800 nationally. 135 people (7.5%) earned over $70,000 compared to 17.2% nationally. The employment status of those at least 15 was that 867 (48.3%) people were employed full-time, 237 (13.2%) were part-time, and 96 (5.4%) were unemployed.

== Education ==
Te Kura o Whare Pā is a contributing primary school for years 1 to 6 with a roll of 238 students as of March 2026. The school was created as Fernworth Primary in 2005 with the merger of St George School and Elston Lea. In 2020, the school was renamed to Te Kura o Whare Pā.
