= Otama, Southland =

Otama
- Interactive map of Otama
- Coordinates: 45.9385214°S 168.839065°E
- Country: New Zealand
- Region: Southland
- District: Gore District

Government
  - Territorial Authority: Gore District Council
  - Regional council: Southland Regional Council

Otama is a rural community in the Gore District and Southland Region of New Zealand.

== Education ==
Otama School is a state contributing primary school for years 1 to 8 with a roll of 18 as of July 2026. It was established in 1883 and was rebuilt at its current site in 1960.
