= Civic Theatre (Invercargill) =

Theatre in Invercargill, New Zealand

Coordinates: 46°24′46″S 168°21′07″E

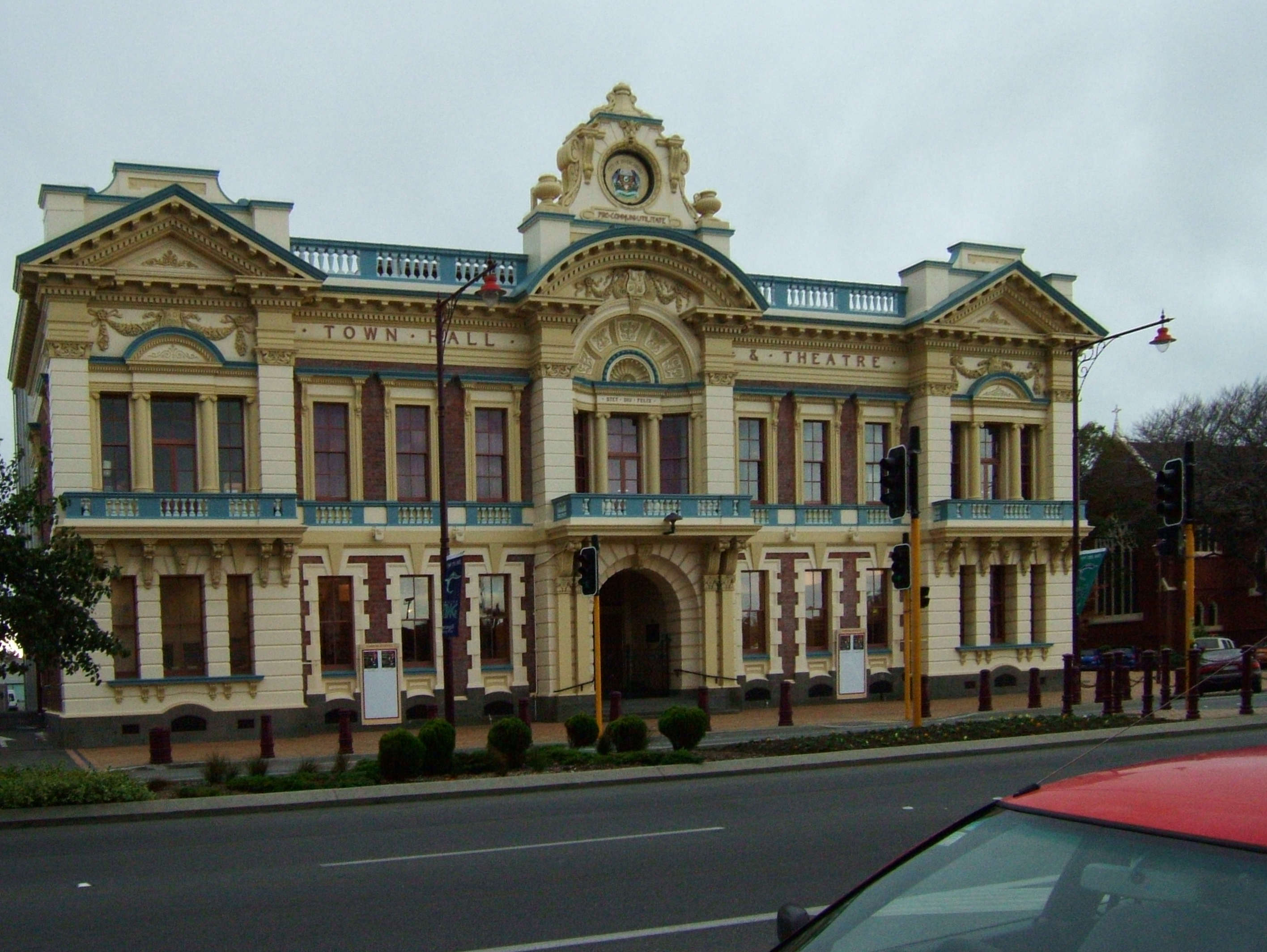
- Interactive map of Civic Theatre
- Location: 88 Tay Street, Invercargill, Southland, New Zealand
- Owner: Invercargill City Council
- Capacity: 1015

Construction
- Renovated: 2004–05

The Civic Theatre is a theatrical venue in the southern New Zealand city of Invercargill.

The theatre is located in Tay Street, in the centre of the city. It is a major landmark in Invercargill, and holds a Heritage New Zealand Category I listing, indicating a building of national significance.

The theatre's imposing building was constructed in 1906 as a replacement for the city's Royal Theatre, which had closed in 1902. The building originally contained both a theatre and the Invercargill City Council's municipal chambers. Most of the council's activities moved from the building in the 1960s, though it still contains the Council Chamber and committee room.

The building was designed by local architect E. R. Wilson (1871–1941) as a two-storey Edwardian Neo-Baroque building. The structure was essentially two separate buildings, with the municipal offices in front and the theatre behind, connected by the dress circle staircase. The theatre originally seated up to 1,350 adults and could be used for either opera or theatre.

From 1919 to the 1950s it was converted for use as both a theatre and cinema. The theatre was renovated in 1984 and extensively refurbished and upgraded in 2004–05, and can now seat 1015 people.
