= Tuturau =

- Interactive map of Tuturau
- Coordinates: 46.2538307°S 168.9113629°E
- Country: New Zealand
- Region: Southland
- District: Southland District
- Ward: Oreti

Government
  - Territorial Authority: Southland District Council
  - Regional council: Southland Regional Council

Tuturau is a rural community in the Southland District and Southland Region of New Zealand.

It is part of Southland District Council's Oreti Ward.

== Education ==
Tuturau Primary School is a state contributing primary school for years 1 to 6 with a roll of 22 as of July 2026. It was established in 1871.
