= Pukerau =

- Interactive map of Pukerau
- Coordinates: 46.0998814°S 169.006556°E
- Country: New Zealand
- Region: Southland
- District: Gore District

Government
  - Territorial Authority: Gore District Council
  - Regional council: Southland Regional Council

Pukerau is a rural community in the Gore District and Southland Region of New Zealand. It is located in a rich agricultural valley in eastern Southland with State Highway 1 and the main trunk southern railway dissecting the valley.

== History ==
European settlement of Pukerau dates back to around 1876 when the township was established as one of the main agriculture hubs of the time.

Originally the valley was called The Swamp. However, in the 1860’s people began referring to it as Taylor’s Creek. This created some confusion as there were already numerous ‘Taylor’s Creeks’ in the south. As a result, settlers adopted the Māori name for the district. And so Pukerau, or The Land of Many Hills, became the name of the township and the district.

== Education ==
Pukerau School is a state contributing primary school for years 1 to 8 with a roll of 55 as of July 2026. It was established in 1879.
