= Newfield, New Zealand =

Newfield
- Suburb
- Interactive map of Newfield
- Coordinates: 46.418°S 168.383°E
- Country: New Zealand
- City: Invercargill
- Local authority: Invercargill City Council

Area
  - Land: 143 ha (350 acres)

Population (June 2025)
  - Total: 2,320
  - Density: 1,620/km^{2} (4,200/sq mi)

Richmond	Hawthorndale	Mill Road
Georgetown	Newfield	Seaward Bush
Strathern	Heidelberg	Rockdale

Newfield is a suburb in the New Zealand city of Invercargill.

The sign at the Māori secondary school Te Wharekura O Arowhenua in Newfield was defaced with racist graffiti in December 2020. Police launched an investigation, and increased patrols in the Newfield area to reassure the community.

== Demographics ==
Newfield covers 1.43 km^{2} (0.55 sq mi) and had an estimated population of 2,320 as of June 2025, with a population density of 1,622 people per km^{2}.

Historical population
Year	Pop.	±% p.a.
2006	2,757	—
2013	2,754	−0.02%
2018	2,787	+0.24%

Before the 2023 census, Newfield had a larger boundary, covering 2.01 km^{2} (0.78 sq mi). Using that boundary, Newfield had a population of 2,787 at the 2018 New Zealand census, an increase of 33 people (1.2%) since the 2013 census, and an increase of 30 people (1.1%) since the 2006 census. There were 1,092 households, comprising 1,347 males and 1,440 females, giving a sex ratio of 0.94 males per female. The median age was 39.1 years (compared with 37.4 years nationally), with 561 people (20.1%) aged under 15 years, 513 (18.4%) aged 15 to 29, 1,170 (42.0%) aged 30 to 64, and 543 (19.5%) aged 65 or older.

Ethnicities were 87.6% European/Pākehā, 18.6% Māori, 4.6% Pasifika, 3.7% Asian, and 1.8% other ethnicities. People may identify with more than one ethnicity.

The percentage of people born overseas was 8.9, compared with 27.1% nationally.

Although some people chose not to answer the census's question about religious affiliation, 52.1% had no religion, 37.0% were Christian, 1.0% had Māori religious beliefs, 0.4% were Hindu, 0.8% were Muslim, 0.2% were Buddhist and 1.6% had other religions.

Of those at least 15 years old, 204 (9.2%) people had a bachelor's or higher degree, and 651 (29.2%) people had no formal qualifications. The median income was $28,100, compared with $31,800 nationally. 201 people (9.0%) earned over $70,000 compared to 17.2% nationally. The employment status of those at least 15 was that 1,083 (48.7%) people were employed full-time, 300 (13.5%) were part-time, and 63 (2.8%) were unemployed.

== Education ==
Newfield Park School is a contributing primary school for years 1 to 6 with a roll of 216 students as of July 2026. It was formed in 2005 by the merger of Newfield School and Rockdale Park School.

Te Wharekura o Arowhenua is a composite school for years 1 to 13 with a roll of 189 students. It is a Kura Kaupapa Māori which teaches in the Māori language. The school opened in 1992 as Te Kura Kaupapa Māori o Arowhenua, a primary school. In 1999, it moved to its current site (formerly that of Cargill High School), changed its name, and expanded to include secondary students.
