= Blackmount =

- Interactive map of Blackmount
- Coordinates: 45.8489781°S 167.6898809°E
- Country: New Zealand
- Region: Southland
- District: Southland District
- Ward: Waiau Aparima

Government
  - Territorial Authority: Southland District Council
  - Regional council: Southland Regional Council

Blackmount is a rural community in the Southland District and Southland Region of New Zealand.

The area is roughly halfway between Tuatapere and Manapouri. It is part of Southland District Council's Waiau Aparima Ward.

== Education ==
Blackmount School was a state contributing primary school for years 1 to 8 which operated between 1901 and 2014.
