= Mataura Island =

Coordinates: 46°25′40″S 168°47′00″E

Mataura Island is a farming community in Southland, New Zealand. It is located close to the east bank of the lower reaches of the Mataura River. Despite its name, it is no longer an island. Mataura Island is located some 40 kilometres (25 mi) east of the region's main city of Invercargill, and 15 kilometres (9.3 mi) south of the town of Edendale, on the Awarua Plains and close to the western edge of The Catlins.

At the time of first settlement in the mid 19th century, the Mataura River flowed to the east of the locality. Early settler Thomas Ayson extended a creek which ran to the west into an irrigation channel linking with the Mataura at both ends. Flooding in 1878 resulted in the Mataura River diverting down the channel and scouring a new bed, and the locality became a genuine island, with parts of the river flowing on either side of it. The old course of the river has now been blocked by stopbanks at the northern (upstream) end.

Today, Mataura Island is a small, dairy and sheep farming community. Until the 1990s, it was the site of a Presbyterian church, which was established in 1900, and a cheese and dairy factory, which operated from the 1890s until the 1970s.

== Education ==
Mataura Island School was established in 1890 and closed in 1998.
