= Edendale, New Zealand =

Edendale
- Interactive map of Edendale
- Coordinates: 46°19′S 168°47′E
- Country: New Zealand
- Region: Southland region
- Territorial authorities of New Zealand: Southland District
- Ward: Waihopai-Toetoe Ward
- Community board: Waihopai-Toetoe Community
- Electorates: Invercargill; Te Tai Tonga (Māori)

Government
  - Territorial authority: Southland District Council
  - Regional council: Southland Regional Council
  - Mayor of Southland: Rob Scott
  - Invercargill MP: Penny Simmonds
  - Te Tai Tonga MP: Tākuta Ferris

Area
  - Total: 2.92 km^{2} (1.13 sq mi)

Population (June 2025)
  - Total: 640
  - Density: 220/km^{2} (570/sq mi)
- Postcode(s): 9825
- Area code: 03

Edendale is a town in the Southland region of New Zealand's South Island. The township is situated on the Southland Plains just to the west of the Mataura River. Before the town was called Edendale, it was known by the names Maorirua, Mataura Plains and Stuart's Bush.

== History ==
Edendale was originally an estate of the New Zealand and Australian Land Company, who surveyed the township and sold it in lots. The estate contained over 120,000 acres. In the course of years the company sold 80,000 acres to hundreds of farmers. The New Zealand and Australian Land Company built the first large scale dairy factory in New Zealand in 1882, and secured a bonus of £500 from the government.

The homestead of the Edendale estate was bought in 1902 by its former manager, Donald Macdonald. Macdonald was instrumental in advocating the use of lime on the soils of Southland which vastly improved their quality. The Edendale Homestead is a Category I building listed by the Historic Places Trust. Built circa 1882, the homestead is approach by a mile long drive through a beautiful and mature avenue of native trees, such as tōtara, black and white kahikatea and mataī. Descendants of Macdonald continue to own the property.

== Demographics ==
Edendale is defined by Statistics New Zealand as a rural settlement. It covers 2.92 km^{2} (1.13 sq mi) and had an estimated population of 640 as of June 2025, with a population density of 219 people per km^{2}. It is part of the wider Edendale-Woodlands statistical area.

Historical population for Edendale
Year	Pop.	±% p.a.
2006	516	—
2013	549	+0.89%
2018	591	+1.49%

Edendale had a population of 591 at the 2018 New Zealand census, an increase of 42 people (7.7%) since the 2013 census, and an increase of 75 people (14.5%) since the 2006 census. There were 243 households, comprising 312 males and 276 females, giving a sex ratio of 1.13 males per female, with 126 people (21.3%) aged under 15 years, 84 (14.2%) aged 15 to 29, 288 (48.7%) aged 30 to 64, and 90 (15.2%) aged 65 or older.

Ethnicities were 91.9% European/Pākehā, 13.7% Māori, 2.5% Pasifika, 2.5% Asian, and 1.0% other ethnicities. People may identify with more than one ethnicity.

Although some people chose not to answer the census's question about religious affiliation, 49.2% had no religion, and 43.7% were Christian.

Of those at least 15 years old, 48 (10.3%) people had a bachelor's or higher degree, and 126 (27.1%) people had no formal qualifications. 90 people (19.4%) earned over $70,000 compared to 17.2% nationally. The employment status of those at least 15 was that 258 (55.5%) people were employed full-time, 72 (15.5%) were part-time, and 12 (2.6%) were unemployed.

=== Edendale-Woodlands ===
Edendale-Woodlands statistical area, which also includes Woodlands, covers 385.40 km^{2} (148.80 sq mi) and had an estimated population of 2,520 as of June 2025, with a population density of 6.5 people per km^{2}.

Historical population for Edendale-Woodlands
Year	Pop.	±% p.a.
2006	2,130	—
2013	2,193	+0.42%
2018	2,262	+0.62%

Edendale-Woodlands had a population of 2,262 at the 2018 New Zealand census, an increase of 69 people (3.1%) since the 2013 census, and an increase of 132 people (6.2%) since the 2006 census. There were 864 households, comprising 1,218 males and 1,044 females, giving a sex ratio of 1.17 males per female. The median age was 36.5 years (compared with 37.4 years nationally), with 519 people (22.9%) aged under 15 years, 387 (17.1%) aged 15 to 29, 1,098 (48.5%) aged 30 to 64, and 264 (11.7%) aged 65 or older.

Ethnicities were 86.2% European/Pākehā, 10.3% Māori, 1.6% Pasifika, 8.6% Asian, and 1.7% other ethnicities. People may identify with more than one ethnicity.

The percentage of people born overseas was 14.5, compared with 27.1% nationally.

Although some people chose not to answer the census's question about religious affiliation, 46.7% had no religion, 44.7% were Christian, 0.5% had Māori religious beliefs, 0.1% were Buddhist and 1.3% had other religions.

Of those at least 15 years old, 237 (13.6%) people had a bachelor's or higher degree, and 375 (21.5%) people had no formal qualifications. The median income was $41,500, compared with $31,800 nationally. 327 people (18.8%) earned over $70,000 compared to 17.2% nationally. The employment status of those at least 15 was that 1,089 (62.5%) people were employed full-time, 282 (16.2%) were part-time, and 51 (2.9%) were unemployed.

== Economy ==
Edendale has a milk processing plant operated by Fonterra which was originally operated by the Southland Dairy Co-operative. The Edendale milk processing plant was a cheese processing plant but in the 1990s expanded to include milk powder processing. The plant has been expanded several times since and was in 2009 the largest raw milk processing plant in the world.

The cheese plant ceased operations in late 2022, and in June 2023, Fonterra announced that the plant would be closed.

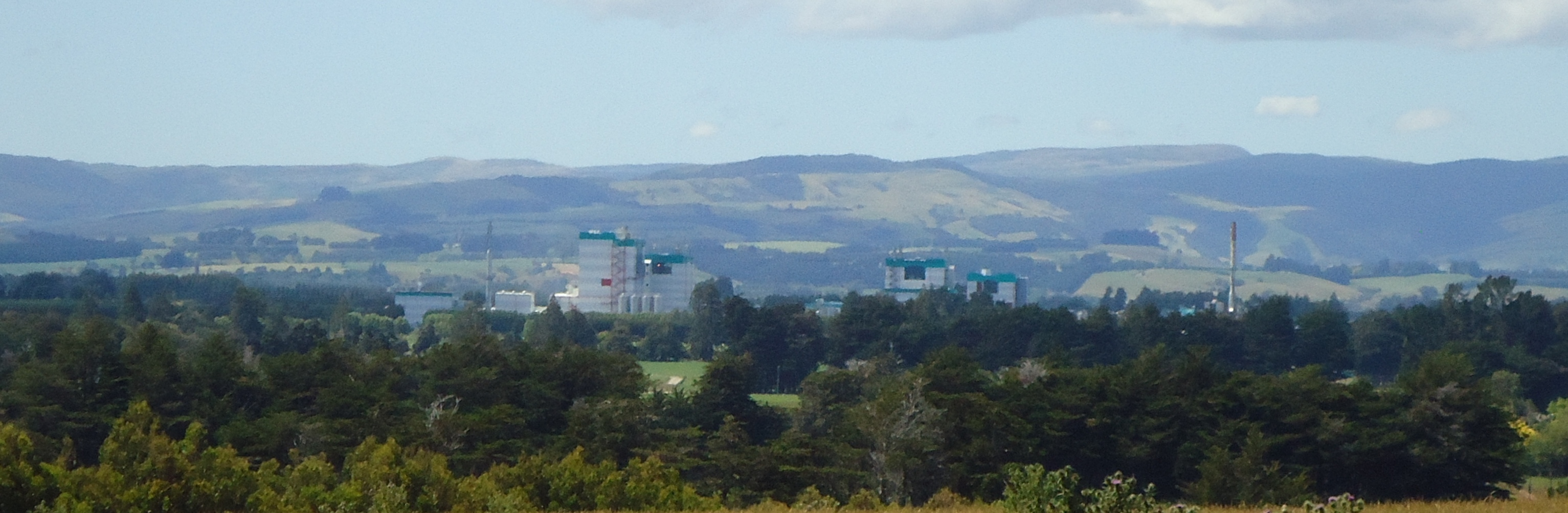
Edendale as seen from a distance, the Fonterra dairy factory prominent.

In the main centre of Edendale, there are several small businesses and operations. These include a butcher, a dairy, a garage, a post office and a primary school.

== Transport ==
State Highway 1 passes Edendale on its route between Gore and Invercargill. A 2.6 km (1.6 mi) bypass west of the dairy factory opened in December 2019, moving State Highway 1 out of the town itself.

The Main South Line portion of the South Island Main Trunk Railway passes through Edendale, having served the town since April 1875. Although passenger services through the town ceased on 10 February 2002, Edendale had been served by some of New Zealand's premier passenger trains – first the South Express, then the South Island Limited, and finally the Southerner.

Edendale was a railway junction for almost eighty years. On 2 October 1882, a branch line from the South Island Main Trunk, the Wyndham Branch, was opened from Edendale to Wyndham on the opposite side of the Mataura River. On 1 May 1890, this line was extended to Glenham. Traffic was light from the beginning, with the extension to Glenham closed on 14 July 1930 and passenger services to Edendale – originally provided by mixed trains and then by RM class Model T Ford railcars – were cancelled on 9 February 1931. By the late 1950s, the line to Wyndham was essentially just an extension of the Edendale railway yard and insufficient quantities of freight meant that the line was closed just weeks before its eightieth anniversary and Edendale ceased to be a railway junction on 9 September 1962.

== Education ==
Edendale School is a state primary school with 105 students from Years 1 to 6 (ages 5 to 11).. It opened in 1909 with a roll of 146 students and a capacity for up to 250 students.

The nearest intermediate and secondary school is Menzies College, 5 km (3 mi) east of the town in Wyndham.
