= Waimumu =

- Rural settlement
- Interactive map of Waimumu
- Coordinates: 46.127°S 168.817°E
- Country: New Zealand
- Region: Southland region
- Territorial authorities of New Zealand: Gore District
- Ward: Kaiwera-Waimumu Ward
- Electorates: Southland; Te Tai Tonga (Māori)

Government
  - Territorial authority: Gore District Council
  - Regional council: Southland Regional Council
  - Mayor of Gore: Ben Bell
  - Southland MP: Joseph Mooney
  - Te Tai Tonga MP: Tākuta Ferris

Area
  - Total: 48.09 km^{2} (18.57 sq mi)

Population (2018 Census)
  - Total: 204
  - Density: 4.24/km^{2} (11.0/sq mi)

Waimumu is a rural settlement in the Gore District and Southland Region of New Zealand's South Island. It is located southwest of Gore, about 14 kilometres from the main township.

The settlement hosts the Southern Field Days, a biennial agricultural trade show. It is held across a 57-hectare (140-acre) site, attracting about 700 exhibitors and 40,000 attendees.

== History ==
Europeans began farming either side of the Waimumu Stream in the 19th century. By 1901, the Waimumu Hundreds settlement had 608 people, and a public school with 21 students which held Presbyterian church services every month.

Gold was also discovered by boring, leading to the establishment of a steady gold-dredging industry. By 1906, some farming paddocks had been completely destroyed through gold dredging.

The Southern Field Days began in 1982, on a local farm, with 60 exhibitors.

In 2002, the New Zealand Government provided funding to the protect the unlogged area of the Māori-owned Hokonui-Waimumu block. In 2005, the Waimumu Trust, which administers the land, unsuccessfully challenged a ban on exporting timber from the forest through the Waitangi Tribunal.

== Demographics ==
Waimumu is in an SA1 statistical area which covers 48.09 km^{2} (18.57 sq mi). The SA1 area is part of the larger Waimumu-Kaiwera statistical area.

Historical population for Waimumu and surrounds
Year	Pop.	±% p.a.
2006	171	—
2013	198	+2.12%
2018	204	+0.60%

The SA1 statistical area had a population of 204 at the 2018 New Zealand census, an increase of 6 people (3.0%) since the 2013 census, and an increase of 33 people (19.3%) since the 2006 census. There were 75 households, comprising 108 males and 93 females, giving a sex ratio of 1.16 males per female. The median age was 43.7 years (compared with 37.4 years nationally), with 39 people (19.1%) aged under 15 years, 30 (14.7%) aged 15 to 29, 105 (51.5%) aged 30 to 64, and 30 (14.7%) aged 65 or older.

Ethnicities were 98.5% European/Pākehā, 2.9% Māori, 1.5% Pasifika, and 1.5% Asian. People may identify with more than one ethnicity.

Although some people chose not to answer the census's question about religious affiliation, 35.3% had no religion, and 55.9% were Christian.

Of those at least 15 years old, 24 (14.5%) people had a bachelor's or higher degree, and 24 (14.5%) people had no formal qualifications. The median income was $44,600, compared with $31,800 nationally. 42 people (25.5%) earned over $70,000 compared to 17.2% nationally. The employment status of those at least 15 was that 111 (67.3%) people were employed full-time, 24 (14.5%) were part-time, and 3 (1.8%) were unemployed.

=== Waimumu-Kaiwera statistical area ===
Waimumu-Kaiwera statistical area covers 648.02 km^{2} (250.20 sq mi). It surrounds but does not include Mataura and borders Gore on the west, south and east. It had an estimated population of 1,580 as of June 2025, with a population density of 2.4 people per km^{2}.

Historical population for Waimumu-Kaiwera
Year	Pop.	±% p.a.
2006	1,233	—
2013	1,278	+0.51%
2018	1,302	+0.37%

Waimumu-Kaiwera had a population of 1,302 at the 2018 New Zealand census, an increase of 24 people (1.9%) since the 2013 census, and an increase of 69 people (5.6%) since the 2006 census. There were 474 households, comprising 693 males and 609 females, giving a sex ratio of 1.14 males per female. The median age was 41.4 years (compared with 37.4 years nationally), with 288 people (22.1%) aged under 15 years, 213 (16.4%) aged 15 to 29, 633 (48.6%) aged 30 to 64, and 168 (12.9%) aged 65 or older.

Ethnicities were 95.6% European/Pākehā, 5.5% Māori, 1.2% Pasifika, 1.8% Asian, and 1.2% other ethnicities. People may identify with more than one ethnicity.

The percentage of people born overseas was 7.4, compared with 27.1% nationally.

Although some people chose not to answer the census's question about religious affiliation, 38.9% had no religion, 51.6% were Christian and 1.6% had other religions.

Of those at least 15 years old, 150 (14.8%) people had a bachelor's or higher degree, and 231 (22.8%) people had no formal qualifications. The median income was $41,100, compared with $31,800 nationally. 213 people (21.0%) earned over $70,000 compared to 17.2% nationally. The employment status of those at least 15 was that 621 (61.2%) people were employed full-time, 198 (19.5%) were part-time, and 12 (1.2%) were unemployed.

== Education ==
Waimumu School operated from 1888 to 1996.
