= Brydone, Southland =

Brydone
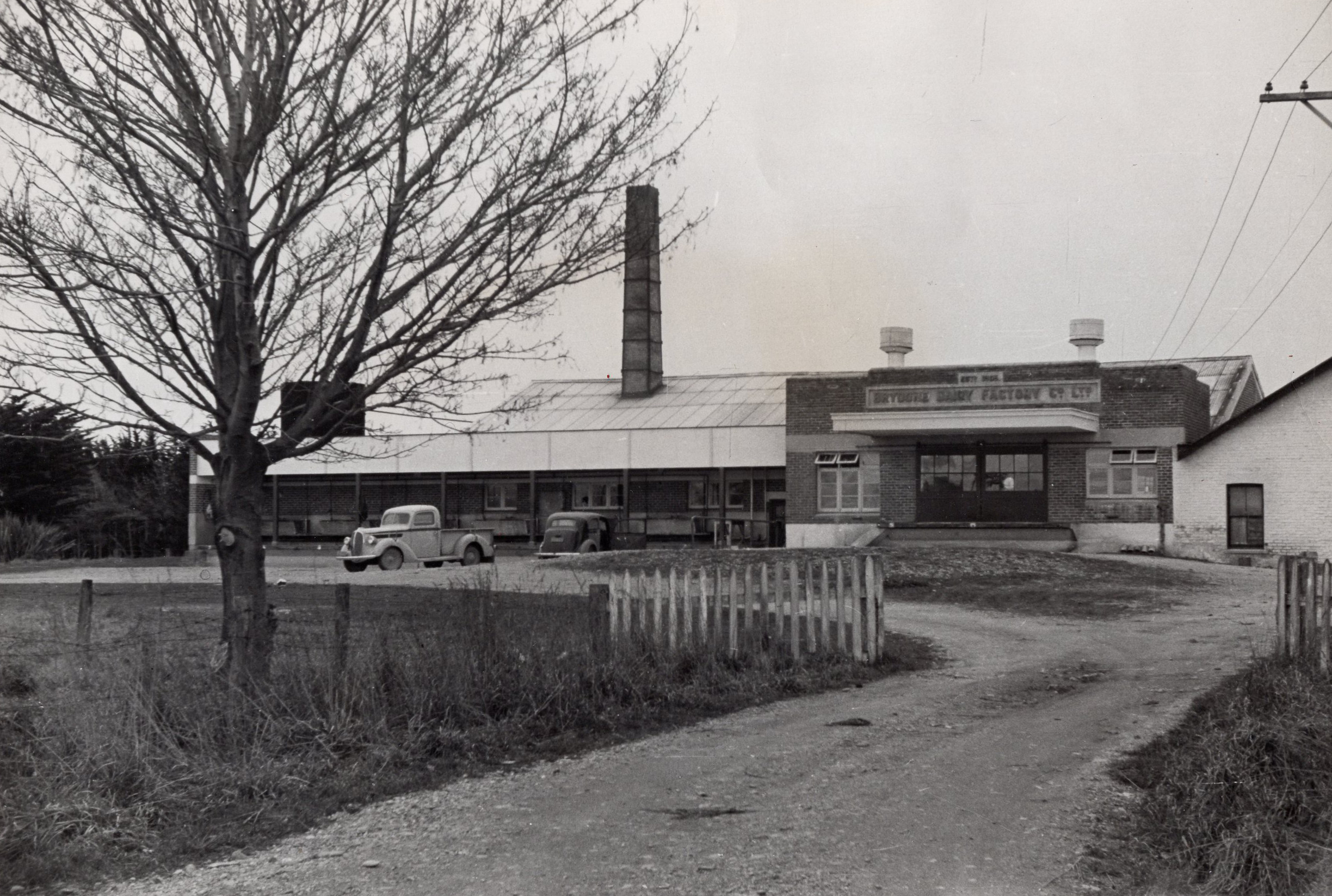
- Brydone Dairy Factory Ltd
- Interactive map of Brydone
- Coordinates: 46°15′S 168°48′E
- Country: New Zealand
- Region: Southland
- Territorial authority: Gore District Council
- Time zone: UTC+12 (NZST)
  - Summer (DST): UTC+13 (NZDT)
- Area code: 03
- Local iwi: Ngāi Tahu

Brydone is a small farming locality in Southland, New Zealand, south west of Mataura. It was named after Thomas Brydone, the superintendent of Australia and New Zealand Land Company. He was the founder of the frozen meat and dairy industry in New Zealand and the dairy factory at Edendale, New Zealand, near Brydone, was established with his encouragement.

== Education ==
Brydone School, was a Year 1–6 co-educational state primary school, which closed in 2007 with a roll of six students. It opened in 1906, and celebrated its 50th Jubilee in 1956.
