= Waverley, New Zealand =

There are two places in New Zealand called Waverley:

- Waverley, Otago is a suburb of Dunedin
- Waverley, Taranaki is a town in the western North Island
