= Drummond, New Zealand =

Locality in New Zealand

Coordinates: 46°09′S 168°09′E

Drummond is a small town in Southland, New Zealand. It is 35 kilometres (22 mi) north of Invercargill and 18 kilometres (11 mi) west of Winton.

The town has one golf course, a primary school and a population of about 250.

The rugby club is now the home of the team Drummond Limehills Star (DLS), which is a combination of three clubs. The club has a proud history, and even has a former All Black originating from it, Jack Hazlett - 6 tests (1966–67).

Drummond's most famous son would be George Begg, who between the years 1964 and 1976 built racing cars from his Drummond Garage, these cars included nine F5000 which raced against the best drivers and cars in the world.

== Education ==
Drummond School is a state full primary school for years 1 to 8 with a roll of 91 as of March 2025. The school was established in 1887.
