= Menzies College, New Zealand =

Menzies College

Location
- Alma Street (corner Florence), Wyndham, Southland; 46.3251°S 168.8461°E

Information
- Type: State co-ed secondary, years 7-13
- Motto: Big enough to match the best, small enough to care
- Established: 1971
- Ministry of Education Institution no.: 401
- Principal: Kath Luoni
- Enrolment: 345 (July 2026)
- Socio-economic decile: 5M
- Website: menzies.school.nz

Menzies College is a Year 7 to 13 school in the South Island town of Wyndham in Southland, New Zealand.

The school was first established in 1971 on the former Wyndham District High School site. Previously the school was a Form 3 to 7 (Year 9 to 13) school. The majority of school buildings were built in the 1950s replacing buildings that were destroyed by fire. Additional buildings were added after 1971, including a new school hall, technology block with art, clothing and cooking rooms, administration area and a new library.

In 1993, a large section of the junior school block was destroyed by fire, rooms 3 to 6 and the Form 7 common room were all destroyed as well as surrounding resource rooms. This section of the school was rebuilt in 1994 and the science labs were also remodeled at the same time.
