= Aurora College, Invercargill =

Secondary school in Invercargill, New Zealand

Aurora College
- Te Muranga a Rangi

Location
- 234 Regent Street; Invercargill 9812; New Zealand; 46°25′52″S 168°22′59″E

Information
- Former name: Mount Anglem College
- Type: State co-educational secondary (years 7–13)
- Motto: It's not just the stars that shine
- Established: 2004
- Ministry of Education Institution no.: 548
- Principal: Craig Taylor
- Enrolment: 604 (July 2026)
- Socio-economic decile: 2E
- Website: www.auroracollege.school.nz

Aurora College is a state coeducational Year 7–13 secondary school located in Invercargill, New Zealand.

It is New Zealand's southernmost stand-alone secondary school, and second southernmost secondary school after The Catlins Area School in Owaka.

== History ==
Aurora College opened in 2005, although it has a history extending back to 1912. It was formed from the merger of Mt Anglem College and Tweedsmuir Junior High School, on the former Mt Anglem site. Mt Anglem College had operated for only six years, having opened in 1999 following the merger of Kingswell and Cargill High Schools on the existing Kingswell site. Cargill High School was the successor school to Southland College (formerly Southland Technical College) after the latter site become part of Southland Polytechnic in 1978. Kingswell High School, which was established in 1971, was built to the S68 plan which is characterised by single-storey classroom blocks of concrete block construction, with low-pitched roofs and internal open courtyards.

Southland Technical College (1912–1967)
Southland College (1967–1978)
Cargill High School (1978–1998)

Tweedsmuir Intermediate / Tweedsmuir Junior High School (1943–2004)
Kingswell High School (1971–1998)
Mt Anglem College (1999–2004)
Aurora College (2005–present)

== Enrolment ==
As of July 2026, Aurora College has roll of 604 students, of which 231 (38.2%) identify as Māori.

As of 2026, the school has an Equity Index of 545, placing it amongst schools whose students have the most socioeconomic barriers to achievement (roughly equivalent to deciles 1 and 2 under the former socio-economic decile system).

== Notable staff ==
Notable staff of Aurora College or its predecessor institutions include:

- Jack Alabaster, cricketer and educator
- Austin Brookes, mountaineer and educator
- William (Bill) James Reed, artist

== Notable alumni ==
People educated at Aurora College or its predecessor institutions include:

- Rex Austin, politician
- Johnny Checketts, World War II air ace
- Simon Culhane, rugby union player
- Ruth Dallas, writer and poet
- Bill Kini, boxer
- Jean McKenzie, diplomat
- Trevor Moffitt, artist
- Mils Muliaina, rugby union player
- Cliff Skeggs, businessman and politician
- Jeff Wilson, rugby union player and cricketer
