= Rockdale, New Zealand =

Rockdale
- Suburb
- Interactive map of Rockdale
- Coordinates: 46.4213989°S 168.3969685°E
- Country: New Zealand
- City: Invercargill
- Local authority: Invercargill City Council

Rockdale is a suburb of New Zealand's southernmost city, Invercargill.

== Education ==
Rockdale Park School operated from 1973 to 2004. It merged with Newfield School to become Newfield Park School.

Verdon College is a Year 7 to 13 co-educational state integrated Catholic secondary school. with a roll of 739 as of July 2025. It was established in 1982 through the amalgamation of Marist College and St Catherine's College.
