= Invercargill City Council =

Invercargill City Council Te Kaunihera-a-rohe o Waihōpai
- Coat of arms

- Brand logo

Type
- Type: Territorial authority of Invercargill
- Term limits: None

History
- Established: 1 November 1989; 36 years ago
- Preceded by: Invercargill City Council; Bluff Borough Council; Southland County Council
- New session started: 17 October 2025

Leadership
- Mayor: Tom Campbell, Ind. since 17 October 2025
- Deputy: Grant Dermody, Ind. since 18 October 2025
- CEO: Michael Day since March 2023

Structure
- Seats: 13 (including mayor)
- Political groups: Independent (13)
- Length of term: 3 years

Elections
- Voting system: First-past-the-post
- First election: 14 October 1989
- Last election: 11 October 2025
- Next election: 14 October 2028

Motto
- Pro communi utilitate

Meeting place
- Te Hīnaki Civic Building

Website
- icc.govt.nz

Invercargill City Council (abbr. ICC; Māori: Te Kaunihera-a-rohe o Waihōpai) is the territorial authority for the city of Invercargill and the surrounding area in New Zealand. It serves as the city's local government alongside Environment Southland as the regional council.

A borough council for the area was formed in 1871, and was granted city status in 1930. Following the 1989 reforms to local government, that city council was dissolved and the current authority established.

The governing body of the council has 12 councillors and is chaired by the mayor of Invercargill (currently Tom Campbell since October 2025).

== History ==
=== Predecessors ===
Following a public meeting on 14 March 1871 to discuss the establishment of the Invercargill municipality, notice of the incorporation of the town of Invercargill was published in the Otago Provincial Gazette on 28 June 1871.

Borough elections for the first Mayor of Invercargill were then held on 26 August 1871, with the election of the eight councillors taking place later on 5 September 1871. The electorate for these first elections consisted of Invercargill property owners. The council held its inaugural meeting on 11 September 1871.

=== Early amalgamations ===
In 1909, Gladstone, Avenal, North Invercargill and East Invercargill were amalgamated into Invercargill Borough. On 1 March 1930, Invercargill Borough officially gained city status. In 1956, the borough of South Invercargill was amalgamated into the city.

=== 1989 reforms ===
The modern borders of the city of Invercargill took shape when Bluff was amalgamated in the local government reforms of 1989.

=== Mana whenua representatives ===
Since 2021, the council has appointed two mana whenua representatives nominated by local runaka. They do not have voting rights at full council meetings but may vote in committee meetings. In 2026, the mana whenua position for Te Rūnanga o Awarua was suspended at their request.

== Governing body ==
=== Mayor ===
One mayor is elected at-large; they chair meetings of the governing body and act as the head of local government in the city.

=== Current composition ===
The current members of the governing body of council are:

Role	Name	Affiliation
Mayor	Tom Campbell	Independent
Deputy	Grant Dermody	Independent
Councillor	Allan Arnold	Independent
Councillor	Ria Bond	Independent
Councillor	Trish Boyle	Independent
Councillor	Steve Broad	Independent
Councillor	Alex Crackett	Independent
Councillor	Andrea de Vries	Independent
Councillor	Darren Ludlow	Independent
Councillor	Marcus Lush	Independent
Councillor	Ian Pottinger	Independent
Councillor	Barry Stewart	Independent
Councillor	Lisa Tou-McNaughton	Independent
Mana whenua	Mike Bain	Waihōpai Rūnaka

== Community board ==
The council has created a local community board, under the provisions of Part 4 of the Local Government Act 2002, to represent Bluff. The Bluff Community Board consists of five elected members and two councillors appointed by the council.

The community board is intended to provide advice to the city council regarding the interests of the Bluff community.

Bluff Community Board
Position	Name
Chair	Ray Fife
Board member	Jo Eruera
Board member	Frazer Murdoch
Board member	Haylee Simeon
Board member	Justin Sutherland

== Coat of arms ==
The city of Invercargill has a coat of arms, which was first proposed in 1956 for Invercargill’s centenary and granted by the Lord Lyon King of Arms on 25 July 1958. The coat of arms is used as an official seal for the council.

Coat of arms of Invercargill City Council
Crest A Mural Crown Argent. Escutcheon Or, on three Bars Wavy Gules a Ram's Head Horned Affrontee proper, on a Chief Wavy Azure a Lymphad Argent, Flagged Gules between two Garbs Or. Supporters On either side a Takahē proper. Motto Pro Communi Utilitate (For the Use of the Community). Symbolism The red wavy bars on the arms are taken from those on the arms of Clan Drummond, which is associated with Captain William Cargill. The ram’s head, sheaves of wheat and ship are intended to represent the agriculture and export activity of Southland, while the mural crown in the crest is a symbol of government. The takahē supporters were included in recognition of their rediscovery in Fiordland in 1948, after previously having been thought to be extinct.

== Offices ==
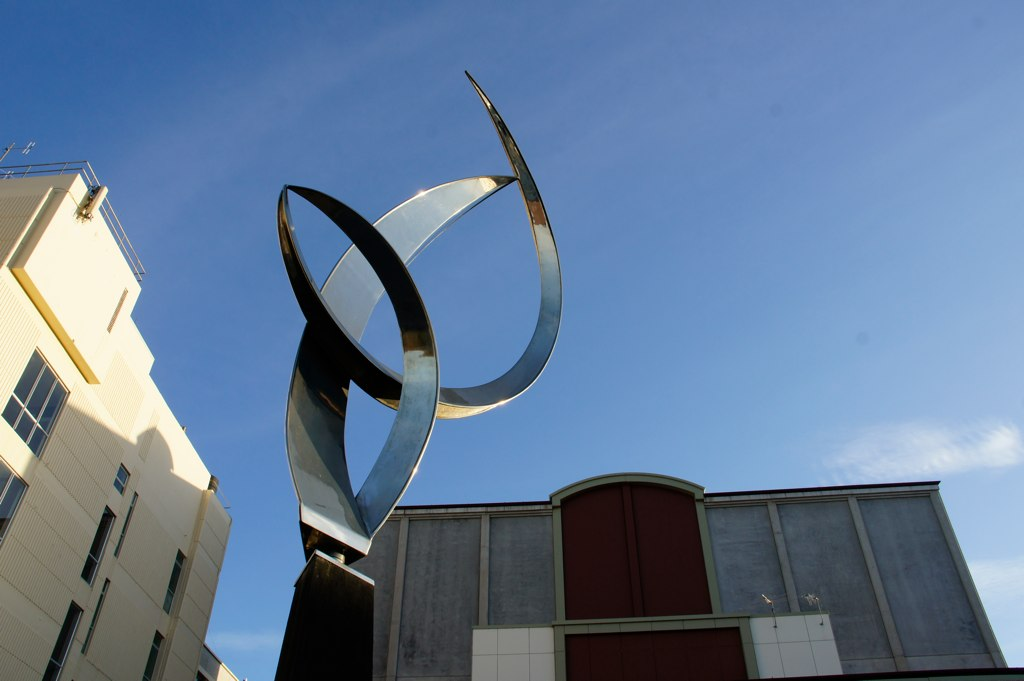
Blade of grass sculpture outside the Invercargill City Council building in Esk Street

The Invercargill Town Hall and Civic Theatre, opened in November 1906, was initially built for the council. Previously the council had sat in what had been the Southland Provincial Council Chambers.

Most of the city council staff left the Civic Theatre for newly built council offices in the 1960s, though the Council Chamber and committee room remain in use.

== Notable council members ==
- William Wood – former member of parliament, first Mayor of Invercargill 1871–1873
- James Walker Bain – former member of parliament, mayor 1891–1892
- William Denham – former member of parliament, councillor 1928–
- Tim Shadbolt – mayor 1993–1995 and 1998–2022
- Lesley Soper – former member of parliament, councillor 2016–
- Lloyd Esler QSM – natural history teacher, columnist, councillor 2010–2019
- Marcus Lush – television and radio presenter, councillor 2021–2022 and 2025–

== See also ==
- Southland District Council – the council neighbouring Invercargill City Council
- Southland Regional Council – the regional council covering Invercargill

== Sources ==
- James, Katie; Thompson-Fawcett, Michelle; Hansen, Carsten Jahn (2016). "Transformations in identity, governance and planning: The case of the small city". Urban Studies. 53 (6): 1162–1177. doi:10.1177/0042098015571060. ISSN 0042-0980.
