= Southland District Council =

Territorial authority of New Zealand

Coordinates: 46.4147392°S 167.7866864°E

Southland District Council Te Rohe Pōtae o Murihiku

Type
- Type: Unicameral of Southland District
- Houses: Governing Body
- Term limits: None

History
- Founded: 6 March 1989

Leadership
- Mayor: Rob Scott

Structure
- Seats: 13 (1 mayor, 12 ward seats)
- Length of term: 3 years

Website
- southlanddc.govt.nz

Southland District Council (Māori: Te Rohe Pōtae o Murihiku) is the territorial authority for the Southland District of New Zealand.

The council is led by the mayor of Southland, who is currently Rob Scott. There are also 12 ward councillors.

== Composition ==
=== Councillors ===
- Mayor: Rob Scott
- Mararoa Waimea Ward: John Douglas, Ebel Kremer, Rob Scott
- Waiau Aparima Ward: Don Byars, George Harpur, Karyn Owen
- Oreti Ward: Darren Frazer, Christine Menzies, Margie Ruddenklau
- Waihopai Toetoe Ward: Paul Duffy, Julie Keast
- Stewart Island/Rakiura Ward: Bruce Ford

=== Community boards ===
- Ardlussa Community Board: Richard Clarkson, Ray Dickson, Chris Dillon, Paul Eaton, Clarke Horrell, Hilary Kelso, Councillor Rob Scott
- Fiordland Community Board: Sarah Greaney, Diane Holmes, Ben Killeen, Ryan Murray, Max Slee, Mary Chartres, Councillor Ebel Kremer
- Northern Community Board: Greg Tither, Lance Hellewell, Carolyn Smith, Peter Bruce, Pam Naylor, Sonya Taylor, Councillor John Douglas
- Oreti Community Board: Brian Sommerville, Natasha Mangels, Andrew Dorricott, Colin Smith, Geoff Jukes, Peter Schmidt, Treena Symons, Councillor Darren Frazer
- Stewart Island/Rakiura Community Board: Jon Spraggon, Steve Lawrence, Aaron Conner, Anita Geeson, Gordon Leask, Rakiura Herzhoff, Councillor Bruce Ford
- Tuatapere Te Waewae Community Board: Margaret Thomas, Ann Horrell, Blayne De Vries, Maurice Green, Alistair McCracken, Keri Potter, Councillor George Harpur
- Wallace Takitimu Community Board: André Bekhuis, Maureen Johnston, David Cowie, Kelly Day, Bev Evans, Peter Gutsell, Councillor Don Byars
- Oraka Aparima Community Board: Graeme Stuart, Sharon Ayto, Julie Guise, Anette Horrell, Neil Linscott, Robin McCall, Councillor Karyn Owen
- Waihopai Toetoe Community Board: Pam Yorke, Denise Fodie, Pani Grey-Thomas, Gay Munro, Melanie Shepherd, George Stevenson, Andrea Straith, Councillor Julie Keast

== History ==
The council was formed in 1989, replacing Southland County Council (1876–1989), Stewart Island County Council (1876–1989), Wallace County Council (1876–1989), and Winton County Council (1877–1989).

In 2020, the council had 159 staff, including 37 earning more than $100,000. According to the New Zealand Taxpayers' Union lobby group, residential rates averaged $1,914.
