= Environment Southland =

Regional council in New Zealand

Coordinates: 46.17423°S 168.100632°E

Environment Southland Te Taiao Tonga

Type
- Type: Regional council of Southland

History
- Founded: 1989

Leadership
- Chair: Jeremy McPhail
- Deputy Chair: Phil Morrison
- Chief Executive Officer: Rob Phillips (acting)

Structure
- Seats: 12
- Political groups: Independent 12)

Elections
- Last election: 11 October 2025
- Next election: 2028

Meeting place
- 220 North Rd, Waikiwi, Invercargill

Website
- es.govt.nz

Environment Southland (Māori: Te Taiao Tonga) is the southernmost regional council in New Zealand, administering the Southland Region, including Stewart Island. In 2006, it had an operating revenue of NZ$19.6 million, NZ$7.1 million of this from rates revenue.

The regional council is chaired by Jeremy McPhail, with Phil Morrison as his deputy. They were elected by their fellow councillors at the inaugural meeting of the new council on 29 October 2025 following the 2025 local elections.

== List of chairpersons ==
- ?: Nicol Horrell; deputy Jeremy McPhail
- October 2025: Jeremy McPhail; deputy Phil Morrison

== Councillors ==
Environment Southland consists of 12 councillors elected from six constituencies: Fiordland, Eastern-Dome, Western, Hokonui, Southern and the Invercargill-Rakiura constituencies.

| Councillor | Constituency |
|---|---|
| Jeremy McPhail (Chairman) | Eastern-Dome |
| Phil Morrison (Deputy Chairman) | Invercargill-Rakiura |
| Roger Hodson | Invercargill-Rakiura |
| Lyndall Ludlow | Invercargill-Rakiura |
| Maurice Rodway | Invercargill-Rakiura |
| Eric Roy | Invercargill–Rakiura |
| Geoffrey Young | Invercargill–Rakiura |
| Alastair Gibson | Eastern-Dome |
| Paul Evans | Fiordland |
| Ewan Mathieson | Western |
| Jon Pemberton | Southern |
| David Rose | Hokonui |

== History ==
In July 2025, Environment Southland led an investigation into Gore's nitrate crisis, which had temporarily shut down the town's water supply, at the request of Mayor of Gore Ben Bell. According to the Otago Daily Times, the investigation was brief and its remit was restricted to determining whether the elevated concentrations of nitrate in the Cooper Wells was connected to a "discrete incident/source." The investigation closed in September 2025 and concluded that the Cooper Wells had "appropriate protections." In November 2025, Environment Southland said the investigation was "completed" and had not identified a "specific cause." Despite these findings, the Gore District Council continued to report excessively high nitrate levels in February 2026 in the Cooper Wells. Consequently, Gore's water supply had to be diluted from other sources. In late May 2026, Environment Southland's inconclusive nitrate investigation drew criticism from several freshwater campaigners and academics including University of Canterbury environmental health researcher Associate Prof Tim Chambers, University of Otago freshwater ecologist Prof Ross Thompson, Victoria University of Wellington freshwater ecologist Mike Joy and Greenpeace Aotearoa New Zealand representative Will Appelbe, who attributed the increased nitrate levels in Southland's waterways to the intensification of dairy farming in the region.

In early May 2026, Environment Southland designated Stephen Hall as its new executive, effective 1 July 2026. He succeeded former chief executive Rob Phillips, who had served as acting executive following the retirement of Wilma Falconer in 2025.

== Coat of arms ==
Coat of arms of Southland
| Notes Southland has a coat of arms, granted on 2 September 1983 by the Lord Lyon King of Arms. The blazon is: Escutcheon Quarterly, first, Or, on a reedy mount vert a Notornis bird Proper, beaked and membered Gules (for Southland); second, Gules, a dexter arm vambraced, the hand brandishing a sword Proper (for Wallace); third, Azure, three piles wavy issuant from the dexter bendways Argent (for Fiordland); fourth, Or, an island Vert surmounted of a fess chequy Azure and Argent (for Stewart Island). Supporters Dexter a Merino ram and sinister a Merino ewe Proper. Motto Above the shield in an Escrol Murrey in Letters Or is placed this Motto "SOUTHLAND", and on a compartment Vert below the Shield, along with an Escrol Argent bearing in letters Sable this Motto "IN UNITY WE PROGRESS". |
