= Crinan =

Crinan is a name of Gaelic origin and it has a number of contexts:

- Crinan, Argyll, a village in Scotland
- The Crinan Canal, a waterway in Scotland with one of its outlets at Crinan, linking Loch Fyne with Loch Crinan
- Crínán of Dunkeld, a powerful Scottish lord around the beginning of the 11th Century and the father of Duncan I of Scotland
- Crinan is a statistical area in Appleby, a suburb of Invercargill, New Zealand
- Loch Crinan, a sea loch at Crinan, Argyll
