= Tasmanian Bands League =

- Tasmania, Australia

Information
- Established: 1946
- Website: http://www.tbl.org.au

The Tasmanian Bands League (TBL) is the governing body of community banding in Tasmania. It is also an affiliated banding association of the National Band Council of Australia (NBCA). The Tasmanian Bands League's operations include the running of music camps and workshops within the state, as well as the organisation of local band-related competitions.

== A brief history ==
Although the TBL was formed in Launceston during April 1946, historical records suggest that there were predecessors to the current banding authority. An organisation known as the "Tasmanian Bands Association" was formed in Hobart on 24 February 1914. In this inaugural year, the association comprised bands from all parts of Tasmania, including: Gormanston, Waratah, Queenstown, Zeehan Military, Launceston City, St. Joseph's, Railway, Williamsford and Collins Vale bands. One year after its formation, the Bischoff, Derwent, Hobart City, North Hobart and Tasmanian Military bands also became registered members of the association.

The Tasmanian Bands League was formed through the recommendation of Launceston Railway Silver Band's bandmaster, Verdi McMahon. McMahon suggested that there was a need for band representatives to meet on mutual terms in order to promote banding and contests in Tasmania. Initial membership of the League consisted of brass and pipe bands, which included: St. Andrews Pipe, Launceston City, Launceston Railway, Burnie Municipal, Invermay, Returned Services Memorial, Hobart City and Queenstown bands. The first ever event organised by the TBL was held at York Park in Launceston on Sunday, 27 October 1946. This was the first peace time Band Day in Launceston. Brass and pipe bands alike participated in the event, which included: Burnie Pipe, Hobart Memorial, Invermay Boys, Launceston City, Launceston Boys, St. Andrews Caledonian, Launceston Railway Silver, Latrobe, Burnie Marine, Devonport Municipal and Ulverstone Municipal.

Currently, there are a total of 14 banding organisations (brass bands and concert bands) affiliated with the TBL:

North	North West	South
Launceston RSL Brass	Ulverstone Brass	Glenorchy City Concert Brass
West Tamar Brass	Latrobe Brass	Hobart City Band (Brass Band, Youth Winds and Wind Symphony)
Launceston Silver Railway Brass Band	Devonport Brass	Derwent Valley Concert Band
Launceston College	Burnie Brass	Clarence City Concert Band
Launceston City Band		Ogilvie High Symphonic Band

Many of these organisations offer development and/or junior band programmes for new musicians. The TBL also offers opportunities for school-based bands to become affiliate members, which enables these school bands to participate in local competitions. Currently, Ogilvie High Symphonic Band and Launceston College's Band Program are affiliated members of the TBL.

== Governance ==
The League is administered by a committee consisting of the executive committee and representatives from the affiliated band organisations. Meetings are scheduled on a quarterly basis, and generally hosted in Launceston. The committee is responsible for making decisions on funding for workshops and the administration of contests, as well as ensuring the well-being of banding in general in the Tasmanian community. The committee also appoints advisory boards (music and drill), who are appointed to advise to the committee on standards for contests and drill procedures. The Music Advisory Board (MAB) advises the committee on recommendations for contest test pieces, as well as recommendations on grading of bands into suitable grade levels. The Drill Advisory Board (DAB) advises the committee on drill regulations, as well as suggested marching parade routes for contests. Both advisory boards are responsible for recommending adjudicators for their relevant contests.

== Competitive Banding ==
The Tasmanian Bands League run two major annual competitions in the state's banding calendar:

- Tasmanian State Solo and Party Championships

- Tasmanian State Bands Championships

=== State Solo and Party Championships ===
The State Solo and Party Championships is an annual event, which usually occurs midway through the calendar year. In recent years, this event has been hosted in Launceston by Launceston College. However, with the adoption of an events rotation policy, the state solo contest will rotate on a regular basis between the three regional centres of Tasmania. The championships take place over the course of a weekend, with brass, woodwind, and percussion solo events that cater for younger, inexperienced players to the novice musician; to the more experienced musicians (with set solos) through to the older members of the banding community (the veterans' ballad). There are also ensemble events available for a wide variety of ensembles, ranging from duets through to larger ensembles of 9-12 players.

As part of the solo championships, there has always been a junior and an open brass champion of champions event, where the winners of each brass instrumental championship section (i.e.: sections which have a set test piece) compete against each other to decide who is the "champion of champions". As of 2014, the Tasmanian Bands League has introduced woodwind and percussion champion of champion events. In addition to the 'champion of champion' events, all bands compete for the aggregate trophy, which is decided by points earned by participating registered band members who have placed in their section. In ensemble events, the ensemble earns points rather than each participating member of the ensemble. Three points are awarded for first place, two points for second place, and one point for third place.

At the end of the weekend, the trophy is awarded to the bandmaster of the band who is awarded the most points throughout the weekend. the trophy awarded is the Jack Lusted trophy, which is named after the late Jack Lusted, who was an influential and respected member of the banding movement in Tasmania, as well as the state's northwest region.

=== State Band Championships ===
The TBL State Championships are an annual event, which sees the state's brass and concert bands come together for a weekend of competitive banding. While the TBL committee oversees the administrative details of the contests, the venue and hosting responsibilities are usually allocated to a host band. Generally, the championship has three parts: the concert band section, the brass band section, and the marching section. However, in recent years marching has been omitted due to various circumstances. The TBL are currently looking towards adding a school bands festival as part of their championships.

The first known record of a state contest, indicates that the contest was held at York Park during the Christmas period of 1947 (25–28 December). This contest featured brass bands and pipe bands. This contest included sections, such as: quickstep, waltz, and grade selection piece. There were also combined item sections, such as the hymn and the march. Although some things have changed, the concept of contests still remains as an integral part of the Tasmanian banding calendar. Nowadays, the state band championships follow the NBCA (National Bands Council of Australia) format of band contests, which consists of:

- Hymn selection (a recognised hymn song)

- Test piece (a major work selected by the Music Advisory Board, which is at the standard of the grade level)

- Own choice (a major work selected by the band's director)

- Stage March (a march, which must be selected from the NBCA approved prescribed list: Concert band list, Brass band list)

The parade of bands marching display is mandatory for brass bands, but optional for concert bands. Brass bands must march in order to be eligible to win the on-stage championships. Bands participating in the marching contest are adjudicated on: drill, musicality, and inspection.

The Tasmanian Bands League is currently working on providing an online resource for all state contest programmes and results. These can be found on the programmes page of the TBL website.

=== Australian National Band Championships ===
The Australian National Band Championships is an annual event that is operated by the National Band Council of Australia (NBCA). The Tasmanian Bands League has hosted the National Bands Championships on a regular basis, usually on a 6-year rotation. Tasmania first hosted the event in Launceston back in 1969, and has hosted the national event eight times. Most recently, Hobart hosted the event in 2010. Previously, Launceston has also hosted the event in recent times: in 2000, and again in 2004. It is expected that Tasmania will host the event in 2017, with the host city being Launceston.

Tasmania has been well represented in the highest graded section, with Glenorchy City Concert Brass in the open A Grade Brass Band Section, and Hobart Wind Symphony in the open A Grade concert band section. In recent years, Hobart Wind Symphony have enjoyed great success under the direction of their musical director Simon Reade, having been awarded the national A grade concert band championship three times (2009, 2010, 2013).

=== International Contests ===
Tasmania has been represented at international level banding on numerous occasions. In 1979 the Latrobe Federal Brass represented the state in the United Kingdom. In 1984 Glenorchy City Concert Brass competed at the New Zealand National Band Championships. Derwent Valley Concert Band has travelled across Europe, America, and Asia, having competed and participated in various marching displays across the world.

== State honours ==
The committee of the Tasmanian Bands League has three main awards that they can bestow onto individual members to recognise outstanding service to the Tasmanian banding community. These range from years' service through to life memberships. These include - 35 Years Service - 60 Years Service - TBL Medal of Honour - Life Membership

=== 35 Years and 60 Years Service ===
This is awarded based on the number of years service to a TBL affiliated band.

=== TBL Medal of Honour ===
The Medal of Honour has been designed to especially recognise commendable services and actions of individuals within the banding fraternity, which have contributed to promoting the Tasmanian banding community in a positive manner. It is also designed to recognise individual efforts and achievements that reflect positively upon the Tasmanian banding community.

=== Life Members ===
Life membership is awarded to recognise people who have contributed to the Tasmanian banding community to a consistently high level over a sustained period of time.

Year	Name	Year	Name	Year	Name
1952	Mr. A.J. Seymour (*)	1966	Mr. L.H. (Bert) Bessell, M.H.A. (*)	1983	Mr. D. Parker
1954	Mr. V.B. McMahon (*)	1966	Mr. W. Pearce, J.P. (*)	1984	Mr. A. Parsons (*)
1956	Mr. F.E. Hodgkinson, M.B.E. (*)	1967	Mr. M. Gurr (*)	1986	Mr. A.H. Tucker, O.A.M. (*)
1957	Mr. J.A. Stanbrough (*)	1968	Mr. T.R. Hicks (*)	1988	Mr. A. Edwards
1958	Mr. A.E. Brain (*)	1968	Mr. J.C. Holland (*)	1997	Mr. P.N. Calcraft (*)
1958	Mr. L.J. Coventry, M.B.E. (*)	1969	Mr. S.J. Lusted (*)	1998	Mr. C.J. Lusted, O.A.M. (*)
1959	Mr. N. Graham (*)	1971	Mr. V. Sutliffe, M.B.E. (*)	2004	Mr. D.H. Peters
1965	Mr. R. Andrews (*)	1978	Mr. T.V Reid, O.A.M. (*)	2012	Mr. R.T. Clarke
1965	Mr. M.H. Lynch (*)	1981	Mr. D.J. Bradshaw (*)	2012	Mr. E.J. Hicks
1965	Mr. V. Perkins (*)	1982	Mr. I.G. Johnston		

(*) Denotes Deceased
