= Alex Lithgow =

Australian-New Zealand composer (1870–1929)

Invercargill March (1901)
Lithgow's Invercargill March (1901) by the US Air Force Band

Alexander Frame Lithgow (1 December 1870 in Glasgow – 12 July 1929 in Launceston, Tasmania) was a Scottish-born, New Zealand and Australian based composer and bandleader known as the "Sousa of the Antipodes".

== Biography ==
Known as Alec to his family, Lithgow was born in Glasgow, Scotland, in 1870. His family emigrated to Invercargill, New Zealand in 1876, where he attended Invercargill Grammar School and Presbyterian First Church of Invercargill. His family was musical, performing as the six-member Lithgow Concert Company around Southland.

As a child, Lithgow learnt violin and cornet, initially being taught cornet by his father. In 1881, Lithgow joined the local brass band, the Invercargill Garrison Band. By 1886 he had advanced to be the band's solo and principal cornetist. However, despite often being stated, he never was this band's conductor.

Lithgow began composing for brass band from a young age. His first composition to be published was the march Wairoa in 1887, named after a ship the band played on at the Invercargill estuary.

In the following years, he played first violin with the Theatre Royal Orchestra and won national solo cornet titles. In 1893, aged 23, he toured New Zealand as a professional cornet soloist.

Outside music, Lithgow was interested in ice hockey and rugby, and played for the Star Rugby Club in Invercargill.

In 1894, aged 24, Lithgow moved to Australia, where became conductor of the St Joseph's Total Abstinence Society Band in Launceston, Tasmania. He earned his living as a compositor at The Examiner and the Daily Telegraph.

Lithgow married Elizabeth Hill Telfer at a Presbyterian church at Launceston on 6 June, 1900. They would have a son and two daughters. He briefly returned to New Zealand in 1901 to conduct the Woolston Band at Christchurch, where at a charity concert, the band performed an entire concert of his compositions.

In 1903 he returned to Launceston St Joseph's Band, before starting the Australian Army's 12th Battalion Launceston Regiment Band the following year. From 1909 he also spent his time conducting and being a spontaneous composer for the silent film orchestra at the Lyceum and Princess Theatres. Lithgow returned to the St Joseph's band for the last time in 1922, before founding the Launceston Concert Orchestra in 1923, where he presented many of his compositions, plus symphonic jazz. There were more charity concerts featuring all-Lithgow programs.

Due to ill health, Lithgow retired from work and music at the age of 57. He died in Launceston of a stroke on June 12, 1929, a few months short of his 60th birthday. At his funeral, massed bands played his march 'Invercargill', and he was buried in Carr Villa cemetery. One pallbearer at his funeral was B. Galvin, a patron for whom he had written the "Galvini March".

== Legacy ==
Lithgow's marches were published throughout the world and the Americans acclaimed him as 'the Sousa of the Antipodes'. Lithgow composed approximately two hundred marches, as well as numerous pieces for band, orchestra, piano and voice. However, he acquired no copyrights and many of his compositions were unpublished or eventually lost. Music dominated his existence, but time for composing was scarce when after a long day's work he cycled home to change for an evening performance or a musical gathering.

As of 2025, 36 of Lithgow's marches are included in the Prescribed March List for the Australian National Band Championships, which outlines the marches permitted for brass bands to select for competitions. This is the second highest number for any composer, with only William Rimmer having more.

Lithgow's most well-known composition remains the march Invercargill, written for his childhood hometown in 1909. During World War II, Invercargill became a favourite of the US Marine Corps, and was the official Regimental March of the 56th Infantry Regiment of the New York Guard.

Lithgow remains a respected figure in Launceston and Invercargill. In 1953, a memorial plaque was unveiled in Launceston at Paterson Street Barracks and a band rotunda built in City Park. Concerts featuring an entire program of Lithgow's music are still performed in Tasmania. In Invercargill, a statue was erected of him in 2019, located in the city centre next to the theater. A biography of Alex Lithgow was written by his granddaughter Pat Ward.

Galvini March 1890s
Lithgow's Galvini March 1890s

== Works ==
=== Marches ===
Marches marked with an asterisk (*) are included in the Prescribed March List for the Australian National Band Championships

- The Aboriginal*
- Apollo House
- Artillery*
- Australia*
- Australian Girls
- Australia To-Day (1926)
- The Australian Wedding March*
- Belle of Woolloomooloo*
- The Boomerang* (1916)
- Brigade of Guards*
- Canberra
- The Cataract* (1894) (named for Cataract Gorge)
- The Courier*
- Cuckoos
- Ellerslie*
- Evandale (1926)
- Fighting Mac*
- Gallipoli*
- Galvini*
- Gippsland (1911)
- Haeremai (1928)
- Hathaway (1929)
- Home Vale (1928)
- Honour the Brave (slow march)
- Invercargill*
- Kia Ora
- Land of Moa (1917)
- Launceston*
- Lithgow
- March of the ANZACS* (1916)
- Middlington*
- Mischievous Tom*
- The National Guard*
- New South Wales*
- New Zealand*
- Osborne (1928)
- Pozières* (1918)
- Queen of the North*
- Queen of the South* (1925)
- Rauparaha (Maori Chief)*
- Royal Australian Navy*
- Ryanda
- Scotch Collegians* (1922)
- The Skipper*
- Sons of Australia
- Sons of New Zealand (1920)
- The Southlanders
- Southstralia
- Stars and Cross*
- Sunshine*
- Tasma*
- Toowoomba (1929)
- Victoria*
- The Vikings*
- Wairoa* (1887)
- The Wallabies (1917)* (named for a recruitment march by volunteers through queensland and new south wales, re-formed as a military unit)
- Westbury
- Westralia*

=== Other works ===
- 1900 Australis, solo for cornet
- 1901 Le Cirque – Fantasia
- 1917 Vera – a waltz

== Bibliography ==
- Australian Dictionary of Biography
- Lloyd Esler Historian Southland Times
- International Military Music Society NZ Branch
- Gavin Marriott researcher who gave the tribute to Lithgow at the centenary to The 'Invercargill' March.
- Rodney Sutton current Patron of Invercargill Garrison Band & Lithgow historian
- St Joe's Big Band Launceston
- Ward, Pat, Alex F Lithgow 1870–1929: March Music King (Armadale, W.A.: P. Ward, (c) 1990).
- Wind Repertory Project
