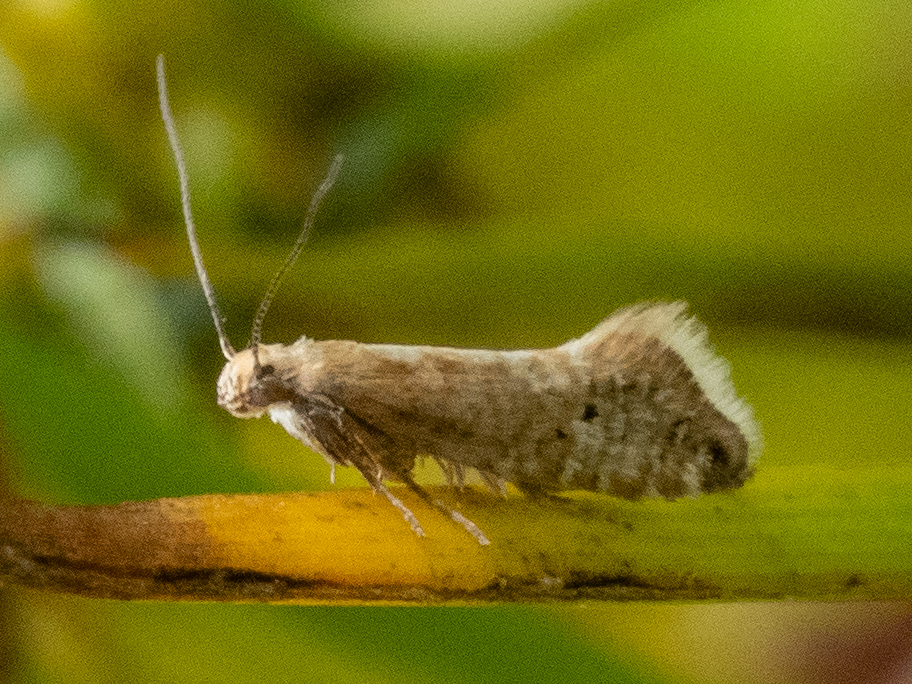

Scientific classification
- Kingdom: Animalia
- Phylum: Arthropoda
- Clade: Pancrustacea
- Class: Insecta
- Order: Lepidoptera
- Family: Glyphipterigidae
- Genus: Glyphipterix
- Species: G. rugata

Binomial name
- Glyphipterix rugata Meyrick, 1915

= Glyphipterix rugata =

Species of moth

Glyphipterix rugata is a species of sedge moth in the genus Glyphipterix. It was first described by Edward Meyrick in 1915. It is endemic to New Zealand. It is found in both the Otago and Southland regions. This species inhabits native forests as well as cultivated gardens. Adults are on the wing from January to April.

== Taxonomy ==
This species was first described by Edward Meyrick in 1915 using a specimen collected by Alfred Philpott in Tisbury, Invercargill beaten with others from Pterophylla racemosa in January. Hudson discussed and illustrated this species under the name Epichorista allogama in his 1928 book The butterflies and moths of New Zealand. The female holotype specimen is held at the Natural History Museum, London.

== Description ==
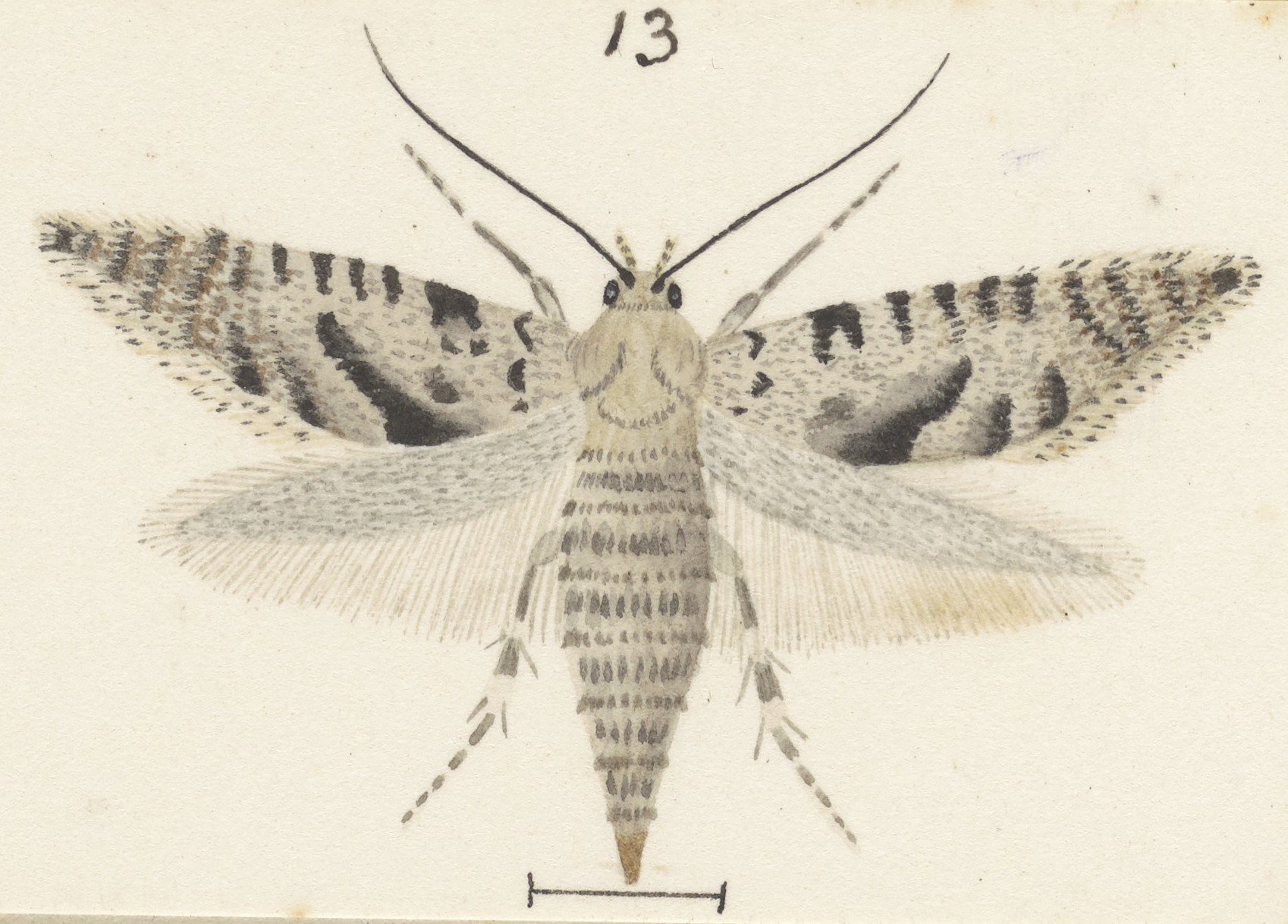
Illustration of female.

Meyrick described this species as follows:

♀. 9 mm. Head and thorax ochreous-grey-whitish. Palpi with appressed scales, whitish, with four rings and anterior edge of terminal joint dark fuscous. Abdomen elongate, grey, segmental margins whitish. Fore-wings elongate, costa gently arched, apex pointed, termen very obliquely rounded ; dark fuscous, with about ten very irregular broken and partially confluent silvery-whitish transverse striae, towards apex becoming confused dots : cilia whitish, basal area tinged with fuscous within a black line interrupted with white beneath apex. Hindwings short, narrow, pointed, light grey : cilia whitish.

This species is short winged.

== Distribution ==
This species is endemic to New Zealand. It has been observed in its type locality as well as in Otago.

== Habitat ==
This species inhabits native forests as well as cultivated gardens. In the later it has an affinity for Hesperocyparis macrocarpa.

== Behaviour ==
Adults are on the wing from January to April.
