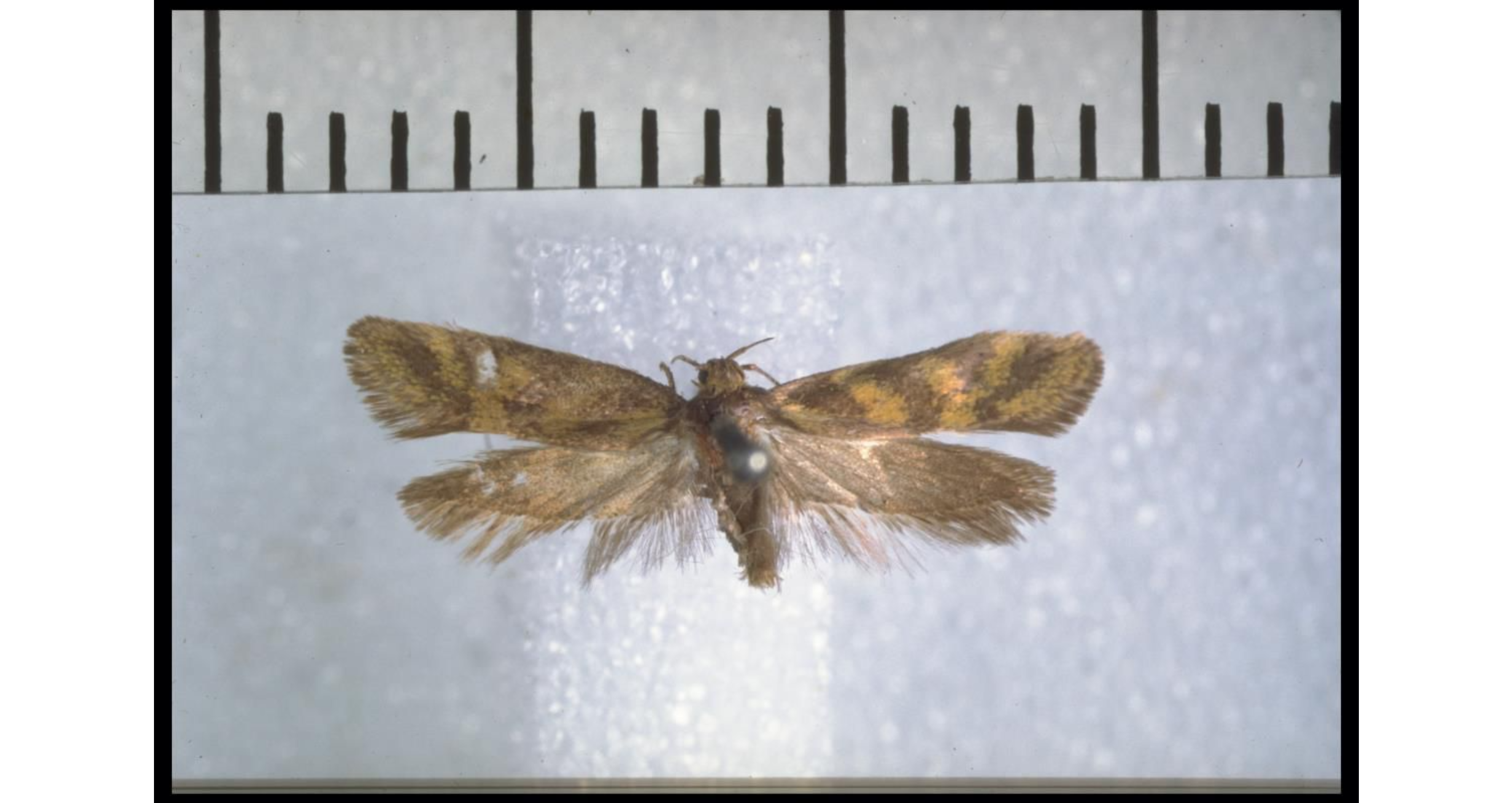
- Male holotype

Scientific classification
- Kingdom: Animalia
- Phylum: Arthropoda
- Class: Insecta
- Order: Lepidoptera
- Family: Oecophoridae
- Genus: Tingena
- Species: T. xanthodesma

Binomial name
- Tingena xanthodesma (Philpott, 1923)

Synonyms
- Borkhausenia xanthodesma Philpott, 1923

= Tingena xanthodesma =

Species of moth, endemic to New Zealand

Tingena xanthodesma is a species of moth in the family Oecophoridae. It is endemic to New Zealand and has been observed in Southland, the Otago region, and on Kapiti Island. This species inhabits native forest and is on the wing from November to February.

== Taxonomy ==
This species was first described by in 1923 by Alfred Philpott using specimens collected in Otago and named Borkhausenia xanthodesma. George Hudson discussed this species as a synonym of Borkhausenia compsogramma in his 1928 publication The butterflies and moths of New Zealand. In 1926 Philpott discussed this species under the name B. xanthodesma and separated it from B. compsogramma based on differences in the male genitalia of these two species. In 1988 J. S. Dugdale confirmed this separation based on both the pattern colour differences between the two species as well as difference in the genitalia and placed this species within the genus Tingena. The male holotype specimen, collected at Tisbury in Southland, is held at the New Zealand Arthropod Collection.

== Description ==
Philpott described this species as follows:

♂♀ 12–15 mm. Head, palpi and thorax dark brown. Antennae dark brown annulated with yellowish. Abdomen dark brown, anal tuft yellowish. Legs greyish-ochreous. Forewings, costa slightly arched, apex broadly rounded, termen oblique; dark brown; markings clear yellow; a fascia almost touching base, narrow at costa, thence strongly dilated; a slightly curved, irregular-edged fascia from 1/4 costa to 1/2 dorsum; a similar fascia from 1/2 costa to 3/4 dorsum; a narrower fascia from 4/5 costa, inwardly oblique and nearly or quite joining preceding fascia above tornus; a broad regular fascia along termen: cilia dark brown. Hindwings and cilia dark brown. Belongs to the chrysogramma-compsogramma group, but differs from the former in having five yellow fasciae instead of four, and from the latter in the arrangement of the third and fourth fasciae, which do not form a definite loop as in that species.

Philpott states that a form of this species can be found in the Hunter Mountains where the fasciae are tinged an orange red colour.

== Distribution ==
This species is endemic to New Zealand. It has been observed in Southland, Otago including in Dunedin and a specimen has also been collected on Kapiti Island.

== Behaviour ==
The adults of this species are on the wing from November to February.

== Habitat ==
This species inhabits native forest.
