= Greenhills, New Zealand =

Suburb of Invercargill, New Zealand

Coordinates: 46.5365°S 168.3045°E

Greenhills is a suburb of New Zealand's southernmost city, Invercargill.

A quaint but sturdy community with a lush grasslands and home of the "THREE SISTERS". landmark of three mountains visible from Invercargill and surrounding lands.

== Demographics ==
Greenhills is part of the Woodend-Greenhills statistical area.
