= Khan Manuel =

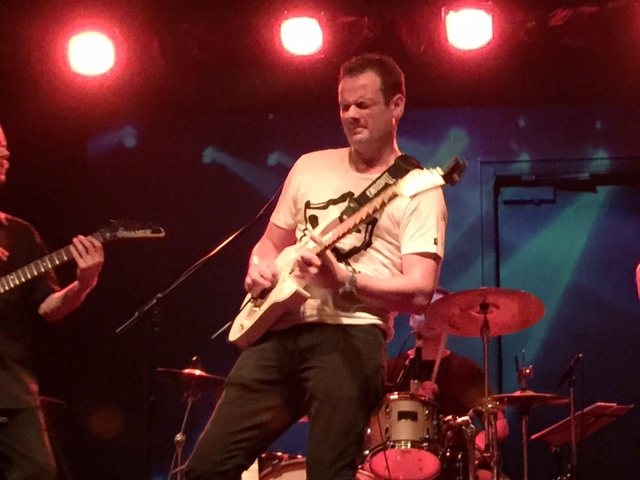

Background information
- Born: 11 November 1979 (age 46); Invercargill, Southland, New Zealand
- Genres: Instrumental rock, hard rock, blues rock, metal, acoustic, jazz fusion
- Occupations: Musician, songwriter, composer, producer, guitar teacher, author
- Instrument: Guitar
- Years active: 1988–present
- Website: khanmanuel.com

Khan Manuel is a New Zealand-born Australian rock and fusion guitarist. He has played and recorded with Frank Gambale and Nuno Bettencourt, among others.

== Early life ==
Khan Manuel was born in Southland, New Zealand. He learned to play guitar from his father at age 10. Manuel later studied at Southern Institute of Technology in Invercargill, NZ. During this time, he played in various cover bands in New Zealand. At 17, Manuel won the open Joe Satriani guitar competition held by Ibanez Australia and won a Joe Satriani signed guitar in the process.

In 2000 Manuel moved to Sydney, Australia.

== Career ==
In 2008 his song The Knight peaked at number 1 on two charts in the U.S. and was reviewed in Hardrock Haven, Guitar World, and other guitar magazines.

In 2010 Manuel collaborated with Frank Gambale on a composition written by Manuel entitled "When Two Become One". The song was recorded in Sydney Australia and Los Angeles.

== Style and equipment ==
Manuel is known for his sense of melody and use of counterpoint melodies. The style of Joe Satriani, Steve Vai in combination with George Benson, Stevie Ray Vaughan and Frank Gambale best describes Manuel's technique. He primarily uses Ibanez guitars with minimal foot pedals consisting only of a distortion pedal and Boss Digital Delay with a Roland Jazz Chorus amplifier. He also uses Maton acoustic guitars.

== Discography ==
Title	Details
The Knight	Released: 2008
When Two Become One (Single)	Released: 2010
Live in Australia @ The Basement	Released: 2010
The Message	Released: 2013
Reflections	Released: 2019
