= Omaui =

Small Settlement in Invercargill New Zealand

- Village in Invercargill
- Interactive map of Omaui
- Coordinates: 46°31′S 168°15′E
- Country: New Zealand
- Region: Southland region
- Territorial authority: Invercargill
- Community: Bluff Community
- Electorates: Invercargill; Te Tai Tonga (Māori)

Government
  - Territorial authority: Invercargill City Council
  - Regional council: Southland Regional Council
  - Mayor of Southland: Rob Scott
  - Invercargill MP: Penny Simmonds
  - Te Tai Tonga MP: Tākuta Ferris

Area
  - Total: 21.94 km^{2} (8.47 sq mi)

Population (2018 Census)
  - Total: 102
  - Density: 4.65/km^{2} (12.0/sq mi)
- Local iwi: Ngāi Tahu

Omaui is a small settlement in Invercargill City. It is located approximately 20 km southwest of Invercargill City Centre near a small estuary opposite Sandy Point between Invercargill and Bluff.

The New Zealand Ministry for Culture and Heritage gives a translation of "place of Māui" for Ōmaui.

== History ==
Omaui was originally a Māori settlement. Sealers and whalers had already utilised the area as a Foveaux Strait base camp in the early 19th century. The first European to survey the village was Robert Williams who had arrived from Australia to scope the possibility of setting up a timber and flax industry on the South Coast.

Omaui Reserve was originally covered in coastal bush of a similar nature to the remnants that remain in the area. This vegetation was completely cleared in the early days and used initially for grazing. Regeneration growth in the early 1950s was mainly of mānuka which was harvested for firewood in the mid-1960s. Over the past 30 years the area has started to regenerate and now has a diversity of species.

== Demographics ==
Omaui covers 21.94 km^{2} (8.47 sq mi). It is part of the Woodend-Greenhills statistical area.

Historical population
Year	Pop.	±% p.a.
2006	93	—
2013	105	+1.75%
2018	102	−0.58%

Omaui had a population of 102 at the 2018 New Zealand census, a decrease of 3 people (−2.9%) since the 2013 census, and an increase of 9 people (9.7%) since the 2006 census. There were 48 households, comprising 57 males and 45 females, giving a sex ratio of 1.27 males per female. The median age was 49.5 years (compared with 37.4 years nationally), with 18 people (17.6%) aged under 15 years, 6 (5.9%) aged 15 to 29, 54 (52.9%) aged 30 to 64, and 24 (23.5%) aged 65 or older.

Ethnicities were 91.2% European/Pākehā, 17.6% Māori, and 2.9% other ethnicities. People may identify with more than one ethnicity.

Although some people chose not to answer the census's question about religious affiliation, 55.9% had no religion, and 32.4% were Christian.

Of those at least 15 years old, 12 (14.3%) people had a bachelor's or higher degree, and 27 (32.1%) people had no formal qualifications. The median income was $29,400, compared with $31,800 nationally. 9 people (10.7%) earned over $70,000 compared to 17.2% nationally. The employment status of those at least 15 was that 48 (57.1%) people were employed full-time, and 9 (10.7%) were part-time.
