= Invercargill =

City in Southland, New Zealand

Invercargill Waihōpai (Māori)
- City
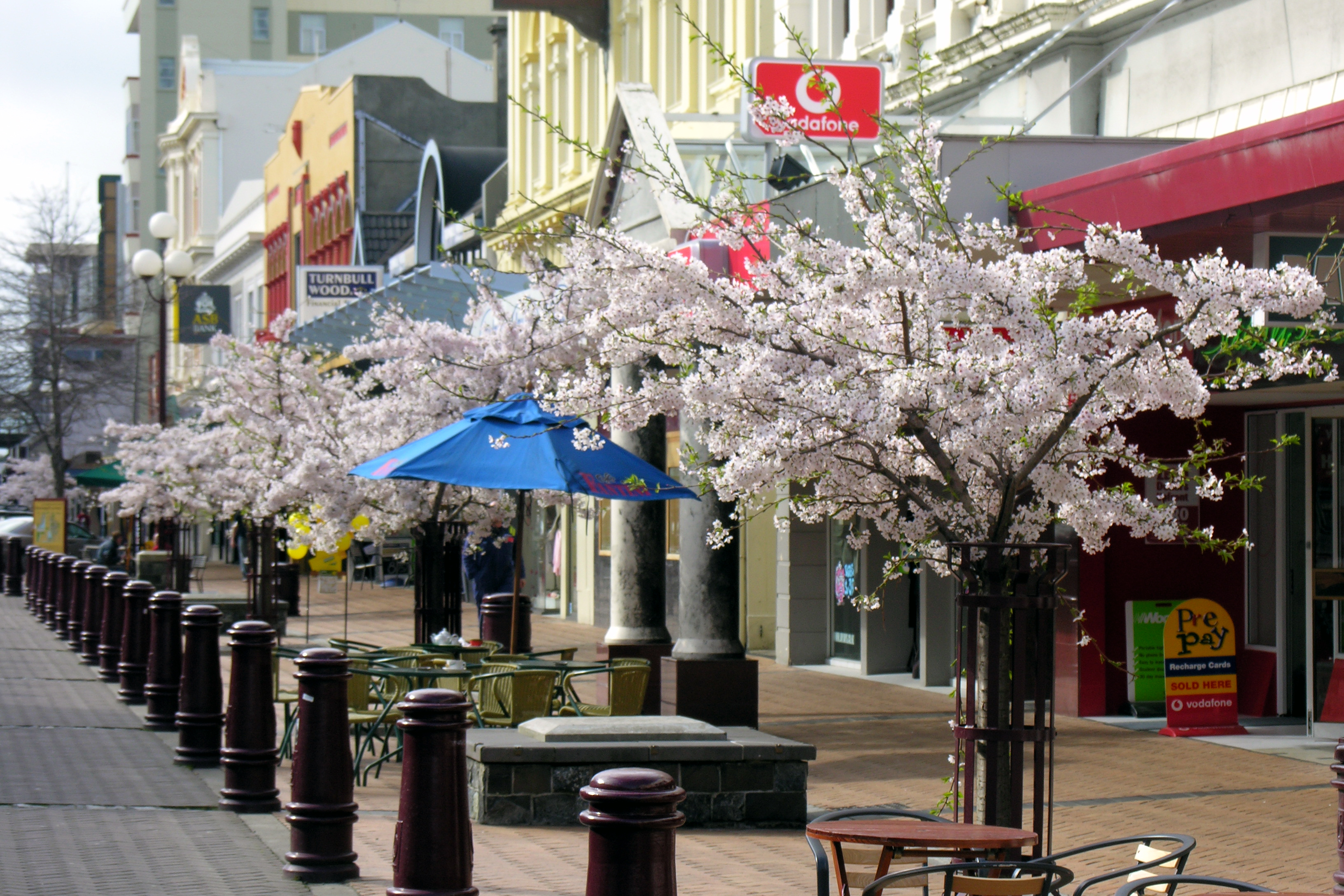
- Spring in 2005, Esk Street, Invercargill

- Flag Coat of arms Coat of arms flag
- Motto(s): Pro Communi Utilitate; English: "For the Benefit of the Community"
- Invercargill in the South Island
- Coordinates: 46°24′47″S 168°20′51″E
- Country: New Zealand
- Island: South Island
- Region: Southland
- Communities: Bluff
- Settled by Europeans: 1853
- Named for: Inbhir – Scottish Gaelic for river's mouth and William Cargill

Government
  - Mayor: Tom Campbell
  - MPs: Penny Simmonds (National); Tākuta Ferris (Te Pāti Māori)
  - Territorial authority: Invercargill City Council

Area
  - Territorial: 389.92 km^{2} (150.55 sq mi)
  - Urban: 62.95 km^{2} (24.31 sq mi)

Population (June 2025)
  - Territorial: 58,000
  - Density: 150/km^{2} (390/sq mi)
  - Urban: 51,200
  - Urban density: 813/km^{2} (2,110/sq mi)
- Demonym: Invercargillite
- Time zone: UTC+12 (NZST)
  - Summer (DST): UTC+13 (NZDT)
- Postcode(s): 9810, 9812
- Area code: 03
- Local iwi: Ngāi Tahu
- Website: icc.govt.nz

Invercargill (/ˌɪnvərˈkɑːrɡɪl/ IN-vər-KAR-ghil, Māori: Waihōpai) is the southernmost and westernmost city in New Zealand, and one of the southernmost cities in the world. It is the commercial centre of the Southland region. The city lies in the heart of the wide expanse of the Southland Plains to the east of the Ōreti or New River some 18 km (11 miles) north of Bluff, which is the southernmost town in the South Island. It sits amid rich farmland that is bordered by large areas of conservation land and marine reserves, including Fiordland National Park covering the south-west corner of the South Island and the Catlins coastal region.

Many streets in the city, especially in the centre and main shopping district, are named after rivers in Scotland. These include the main streets Dee and Tay, as well as those named after the Tweed, Forth, Tyne, Esk, Don, Ness, Yarrow, Spey, Eye and Ythan rivers, amongst others.

== Toponymy ==
Inver comes from the Scottish Gaelic word inbhir meaning 'a river's mouth' and Cargill is in honour of Captain William Cargill, who was at the time the Superintendent of Otago, of which Southland was then a part.

The Māori name for the city, Waihōpai, comes from the Waihopai River. It may be a corruption of Waiopai, meaning wai ('water or stream') of Pai.

== History ==
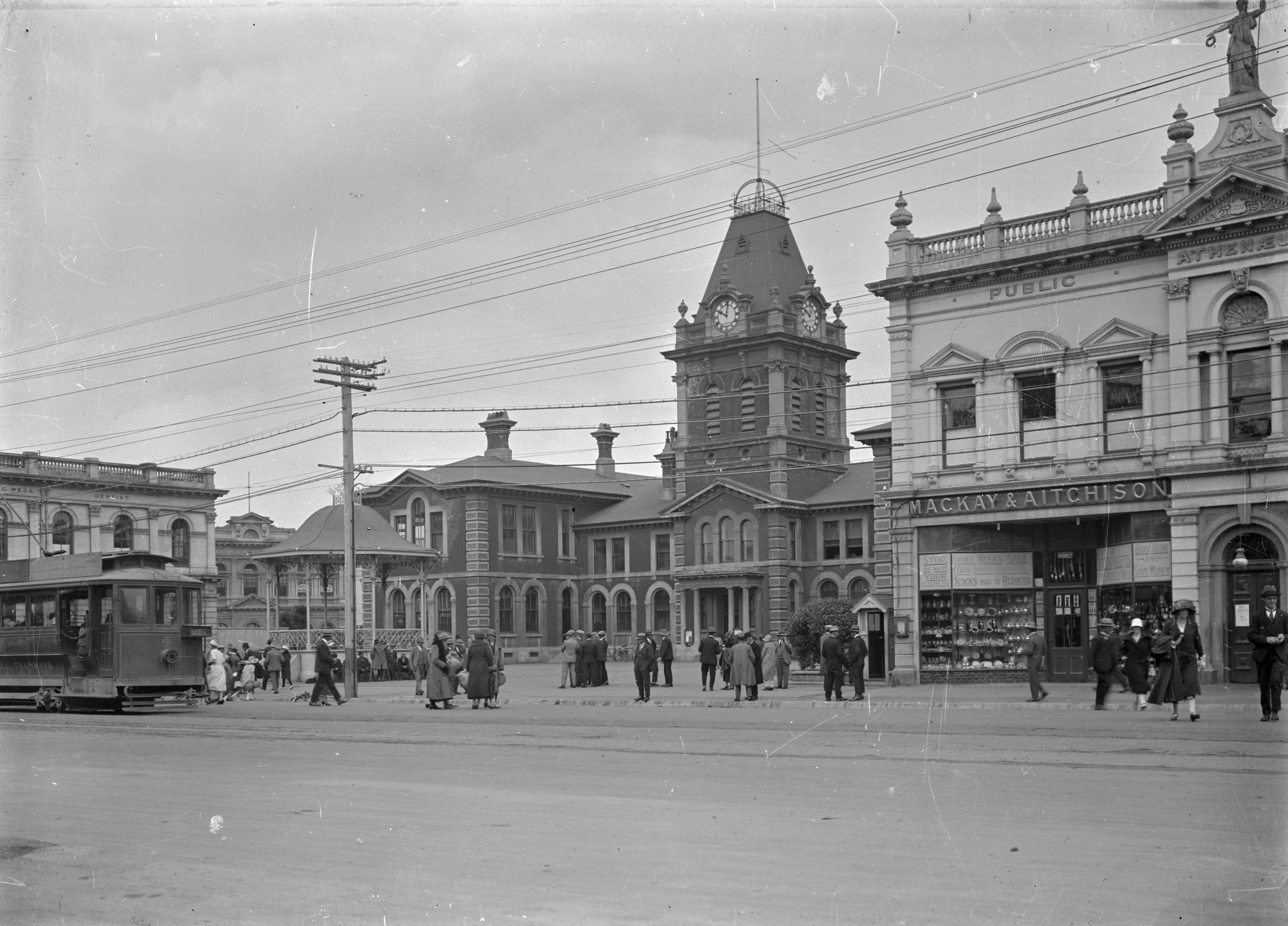
Invercargill Post Office at centre and the McKay & Aitchison, Arcade Auction Mart, auctioneers and valuers on right, 1926

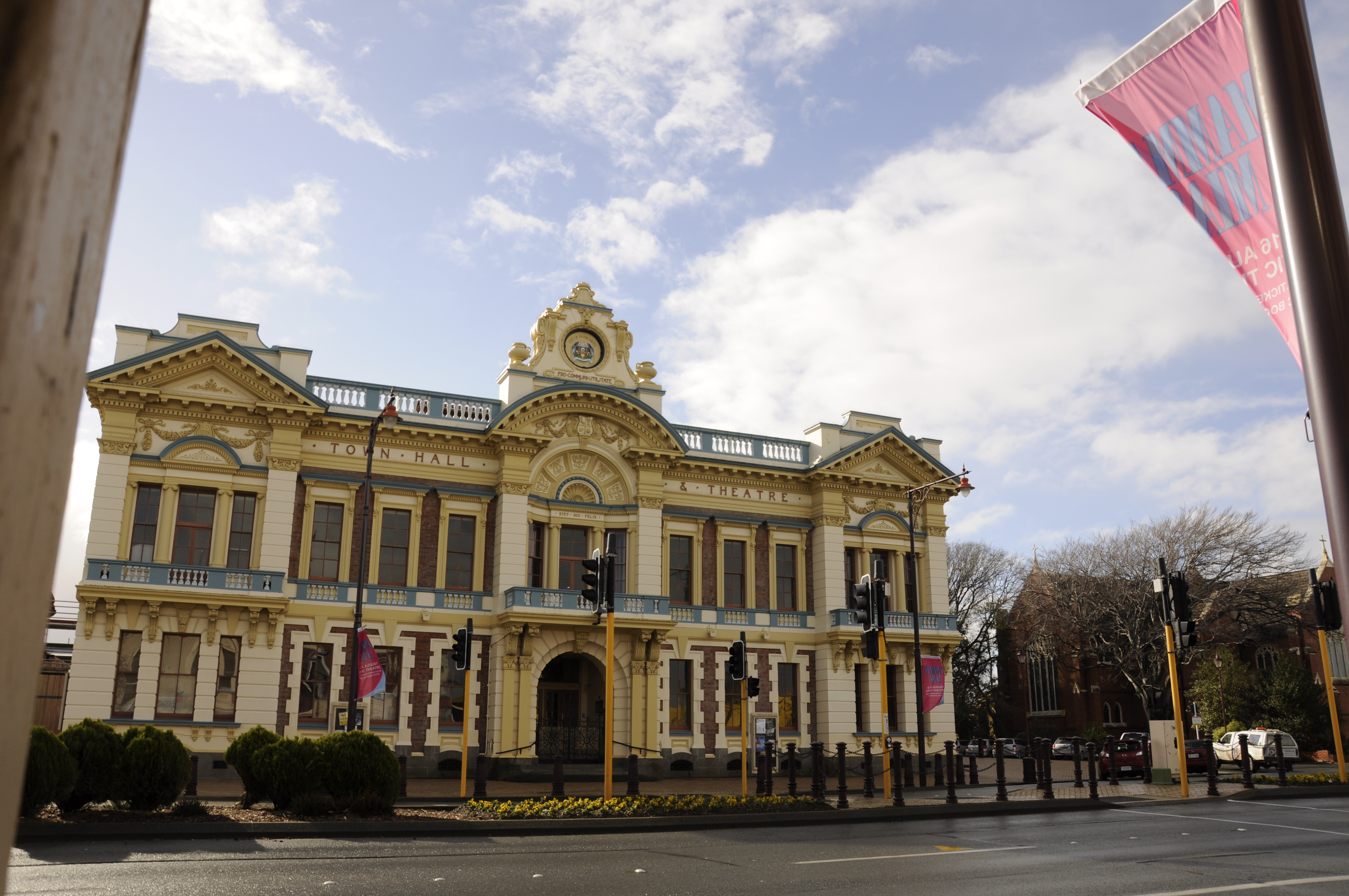
Civic Theatre, the town hall of Invercargill – built in 1906.

Southland was the scene of early extended contact between Europeans and Māori, notably whalers and missionaries – Wohlers at Ruapuke Island. In 1853, Walter Mantell purchased Murihiku from local Māori iwi, claiming the land for European settlement. Otago, of which Southland was itself part, was the subject of planned settlement by the Free Church of Scotland, an offshoot of the Church of Scotland. Settlement broadened with the discovery of gold in Central Otago in the 1860s. Traces of Scottish speech persist in Southland voices, with R often pronounced with a rolling burr. This is more noticeable among country people.

In 1856, a petition was put forward to Thomas Gore Browne, the Governor of New Zealand, for a port at Bluff. During the Otago gold rush, the region's population grew during the 1860s with the settlement of Bluff. Browne agreed to the petition and gave the name Invercargill to the settlement north of the port. The settlement's chief surveyor was John Turnbull Thomson, a British civil engineer.

On 5 February 1867, the 27 km railway line from Invercargill to the port at Bluff opened, the third public railway in the colony, reflecting the town's ambitions to link to maritime trade.

Under the influence of James Menzies, Southland Province (a small part of the present Region, centred on Invercargill) seceded from Otago in 1861 following the escalation of political tensions. However, rising debt forced Southland to rejoin Otago in 1870 and the provincial system, and with it the province of Otago, was abolished entirely in 1876. This debt was caused by a population decline stemming from poor returns from pastoral farming. In 1874, Invercargill's population was less than 2,500, which reflected the drift north to large centres. In the 1880s, the development of an export industry based on butter and cheese encouraged the growth of dairy farming in Southland.

On 6 August 1884, a group of women gathered together in the Don Street Primitive Methodist Church to form a local branch of the Woman's Christian Temperance Union. Eliza Ann Brown, wife of Charles W. Brown (who that same year co-founded the local Independent Order of Rechabites), led the group to establish eight main objectives, which included gathering signatures for a petition for women's suffrage. This was the first all-women's organisation established in New Zealand. After affiliating with the new national organisation, the Women's Christian Temperance Union of New Zealand, under the guidance of world missionary Mary C. Leavitt, Roberta Annie Hinton, wife of the new Baptist minister, led the new club as it worked to strengthen the temperance movement in the area and support the needs of women and children across the nation. By 1897, a founding member of this first branch of the WCTU Invercargill, Mrs. Elizabeth Stephen Baird, led the establishment of the Victoria Home for Friendless Girls.

In 1889, Instant coffee was invented in Invercargill by David Strang. In 1890 he patented Strang’s Soluble Dry Coffee-Powder.

In December 1905, Invercargill voted in local prohibition of alcohol sales. This lasted for 40 years until voted out by returning servicemen in the Second World War. Drinking continued meanwhile, thanks to hotels and liquor merchants in outlying districts, huge volumes of beer, often in kegs, brought to private homes, or sold by the glass by keggers at hiding spots round the city. When prohibition ended, a committee of citizens persuaded the Government to give the monopoly on liquor sales in Invercargill to the specially formed Invercargill Licensing Trust. Based on a scheme in Carlisle, England, it returns profits to city amenities. Even today, alcohol is not sold in supermarkets.

Publicity was brought to the city by the election of Tim Shadbolt, a colourful and outspoken former student activist and former mayor of Waitemata City, as mayor. His supporters liked the colour he brought to the city. His opponents referred to his controversial mayoral career in the Auckland suburbs and to his attitude to veterans during his opposition to the Vietnam War. Publicity and students have also been drawn to the city by the Southern Institute of Technology's "Zero Fees" scheme, which allows New Zealand citizens and permanent residents to study while only paying for material costs of their study, and not tuition fees.

== Geography ==
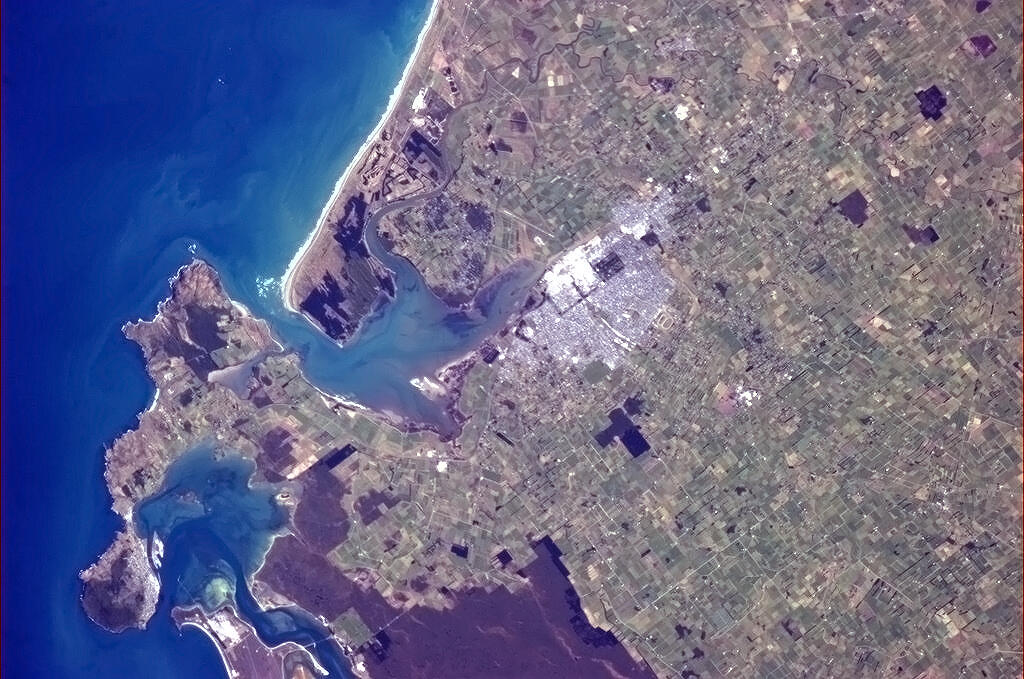
Invercargill pictured from the International Space Station

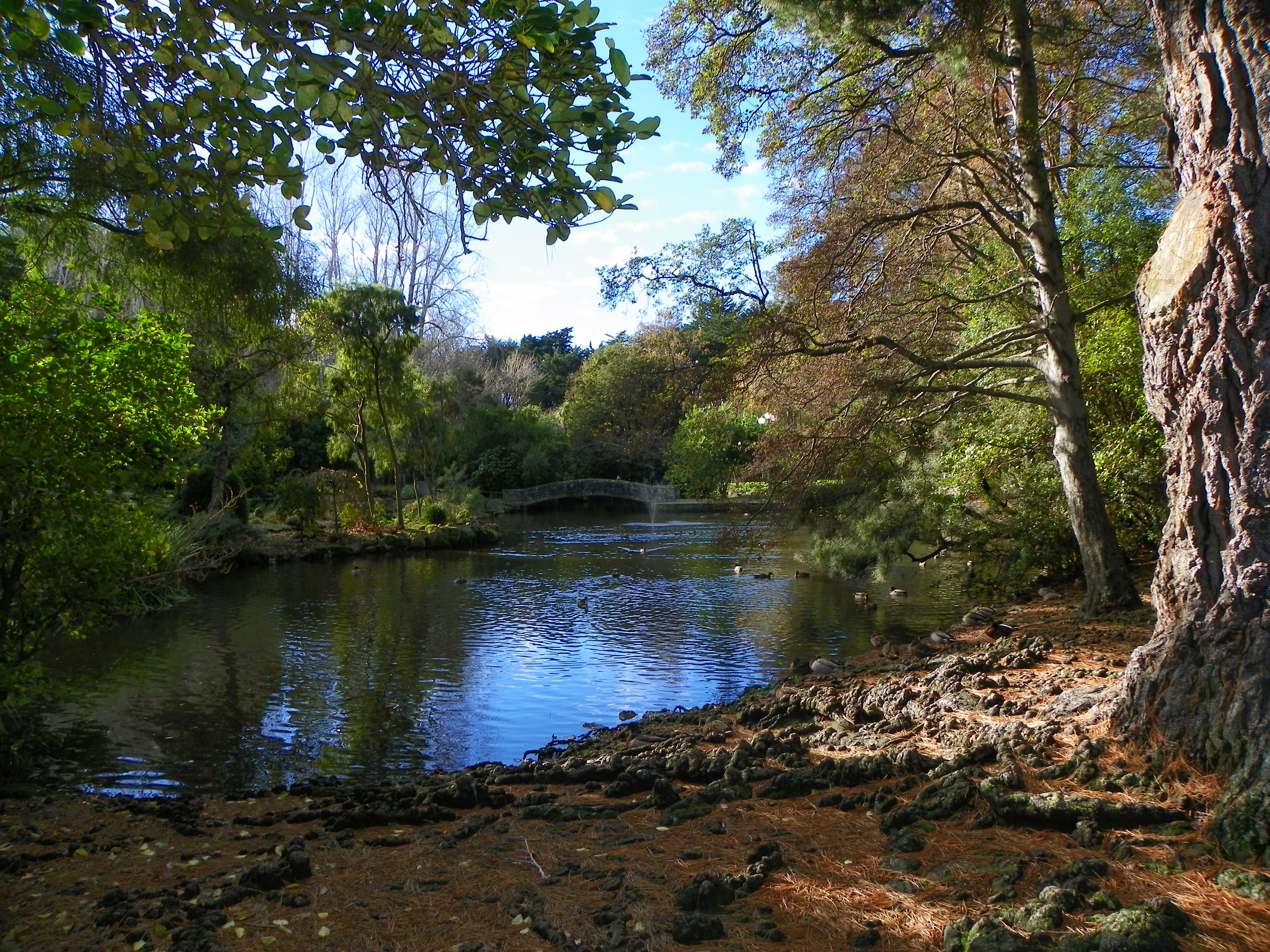
Queens Park

Invercargill is the southernmost city in the Commonwealth of Nations. Invercargill is situated on the fertile and alluvial Southland Plains, which is amongst some of New Zealand's most fertile farmland. Southern Invercargill lies on the shore of the New River Estuary, while the northern parts lie on the banks of the Waihopai River. The Otepuni Stream or Creek, which flows from east to west through the city, through Otepuni Gardens, and under the railway yards. 10 kilometres west of the city centre lies Oreti Beach, a long expanse of sand stretching from the Sandy Point area to nearby Riverton.

Owing to its relatively high latitude (46° 24′), the city enjoys nearly 16 hours of daylight at the summer solstice in late December, with astronomical night lasting as little as 2.5 hours. Conversely, the city receives only around 8.5 hours of daylight at the winter solstice in late June.

Invercargill is the "City of Water and Light". The "light" refers to the long summer twilights and the aurora australis (southern lights). The "water" reference, humorists suggest, comes from notorious horizontal, driving rain in high wind at the corner of the two main streets, Dee and Tay. A recent sign also states, "Invercargill, where dreams can come true" with an image from the 2005 film The World's Fastest Indian.

=== Suburbs ===
==== Inner Invercargill suburbs ====
- Appleby
- Avenal
- Clifton
- Georgetown
- Gladstone
- Glengarry
- Grasmere
- Hargest
- Hawthorndale
- Heidelberg
- Invercargill Central
- Kew
- Kingswell
- Newfield
- Prestonville
- Richmond
- Rockdale
- Rosedale
- Strathern
- Waikiwi
- Waverley
- West Invercargill
- Windsor

==== Outer Invercargill localities ====
- Awarua
- Awarua Plains
- Bluff^{1}
- Greenhills
- Greenpoint
- Kennington
- Lorneville
- Makarewa
- Motu Rimu
- Myross Bush
- Omaui
- Oreti Beach
- Otatara^{1}
- Sandy Point
- Seaward Bush
- Taramoa
- Tisbury
- Tiwai Point
- Underwood
- Wallacetown^{1}
- West Plains
- Waimatua
- Woodend

^{1} - major settlement

=== Climate ===
Invercargill has a temperate oceanic climate. The mean daily temperature ranges from 5.2 °C (41.4 °F) in July to 14 °C (57 °F) in January. The yearly mean temperature is 9.8 °C (49.6 °F). Rainfall averages 1,112 millimetres (43.8 in) annually, and measurable snowfall is occasionally seen during the winter months of June to September. It narrowly beats neighbouring Dunedin as the cloudiest city in New Zealand, with only 1,764 hours of sunshine per annum. Despite its cloudiness, and a relatively high frequency of rainy days, Invercargill receives less rain than either Auckland or Wellington. Invercargill is also New Zealand's second-windiest city, after Wellington. The average temperature high ranges from 18.7 °C (65.7 °F) in January to 9.5 °C (49.1 °F) in July, but temperatures do occasionally exceed 25 °C (77 °F) in summer. Invercargill's hottest temperature on record was 33.8 °C (92.8 °F), recorded on 2 January 1948.

Extended periods of heat are rare; however, January 2018 was notable for the city recording three consecutive days above 30 for the first time in its recorded history, peaking with the city's second-highest temperature on record of 32.3 °C (90.1 °F) on 14 January 2018. Like other urban areas in New Zealand, Invercargill sometimes experiences an urban heat island effect; temperatures are slightly higher within the inner-city regions compared to the surrounding countryside. This is typically between 1-2°C and depends on factors like wind speed and cloud cover.

In September 2010, Invercargill's heaviest snowfall in living memory heralded a run of unseasonably cold weather. A few buildings were damaged, notably Stadium Southland, the roof of which collapsed under the weight of the snow; and a decorating store. Many other stores were shut, and Invercargill Airport was closed for a day. Invercargill is one of four places in New Zealand where weather balloons are regularly launched for MetService.

Climate data for Invercargill (1991–2020 normals, extremes 1905–present)
Month	Jan	Feb	Mar	Apr	May	Jun	Jul	Aug	Sep	Oct	Nov	Dec	Year
Record high °C (°F)	33.8 (92.8)	32.1 (89.8)	30.4 (86.7)	26.1 (79.0)	23.8 (74.8)	19.4 (66.9)	20.6 (69.1)	21.8 (71.2)	23.3 (73.9)	25.9 (78.6)	28.3 (82.9)	31.1 (88.0)	33.8 (92.8)
Mean maximum °C (°F)	26.9 (80.4)	26.6 (79.9)	24.9 (76.8)	21.4 (70.5)	18.3 (64.9)	14.8 (58.6)	14.7 (58.5)	16.4 (61.5)	19.4 (66.9)	21.8 (71.2)	23.5 (74.3)	26.1 (79.0)	28.6 (83.5)
Mean daily maximum °C (°F)	18.9 (66.0)	18.7 (65.7)	17.5 (63.5)	15.0 (59.0)	12.5 (54.5)	10.0 (50.0)	9.6 (49.3)	11.1 (52.0)	13.0 (55.4)	14.4 (57.9)	15.8 (60.4)	17.9 (64.2)	14.5 (58.1)
Daily mean °C (°F)	14.2 (57.6)	14.1 (57.4)	12.7 (54.9)	10.5 (50.9)	8.3 (46.9)	6.0 (42.8)	5.4 (41.7)	6.6 (43.9)	8.5 (47.3)	10.0 (50.0)	11.3 (52.3)	13.3 (55.9)	10.1 (50.2)
Mean daily minimum °C (°F)	9.5 (49.1)	9.4 (48.9)	7.8 (46.0)	6.0 (42.8)	4.1 (39.4)	2.0 (35.6)	1.1 (34.0)	2.2 (36.0)	3.9 (39.0)	5.5 (41.9)	6.9 (44.4)	8.6 (47.5)	5.6 (42.1)
Mean minimum °C (°F)	4.0 (39.2)	3.2 (37.8)	1.7 (35.1)	−0.4 (31.3)	−1.6 (29.1)	−3.4 (25.9)	−4.6 (23.7)	−3.4 (25.9)	−1.4 (29.5)	0.1 (32.2)	1.4 (34.5)	3.0 (37.4)	−4.9 (23.2)
Record low °C (°F)	−0.9 (30.4)	−2.4 (27.7)	−2.4 (27.7)	−4.9 (23.2)	−6.9 (19.6)	−7.4 (18.7)	−9.1 (15.6)	−8.0 (17.6)	−4.5 (23.9)	−3.2 (26.2)	−2.0 (28.4)	−1.1 (30.0)	−9.1 (15.6)
Average rainfall mm (inches)	88.7 (3.49)	74.2 (2.92)	91.8 (3.61)	89.5 (3.52)	108.4 (4.27)	95.1 (3.74)	88.0 (3.46)	70.4 (2.77)	90.4 (3.56)	106.2 (4.18)	101.7 (4.00)	92.9 (3.66)	1,097.3 (43.18)
Average rainy days (≥ 1.0 mm)	12.6	10.6	11.9	12.1	14.7	15.4	14.4	12.3	13.5	15.4	14.4	13.3	160.6
Average relative humidity (%)	81.6	85.4	86.7	86.2	88.1	88.4	88.6	88.1	82.5	81.8	79.4	78.9	84.6
Average dew point °C (°F)	11.1 (52.0)	11.7 (53.1)	10.5 (50.9)	8.3 (46.9)	6.4 (43.5)	4.2 (39.6)	3.7 (38.7)	4.8 (40.6)	5.7 (42.3)	7.0 (44.6)	7.9 (46.2)	9.7 (49.5)	7.6 (45.7)
Mean monthly sunshine hours	200.1	175.7	152.2	123.4	94.6	82.9	101.3	125.5	145.7	175.4	186.2	201.6	1,764.6
Mean daily daylight hours	15.3	14.0	12.4	10.7	9.4	8.7	9.0	10.2	11.8	13.4	14.9	15.7	12.1
Percentage possible sunshine	42	44	40	38	32	32	36	40	41	42	42	41	39
Source 1: NIWA Climate Data
Source 2: Météo Climat Weather Spark

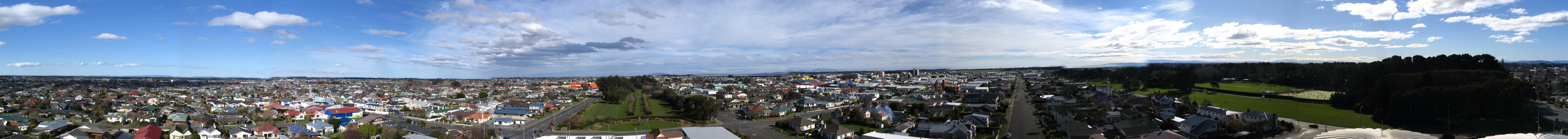
Panorama of Invercargill from the city's historic watertower. Queen's Park can be seen toward the right of the image.

== Demographics ==
The Invercargill City territorial authority covers 389.92 km^{2} (150.55 sq mi) and had an estimated population of 58,000 as of June 2025, with a population density of 149 people per km^{2}. This comprises 51,200 people in the Invercargill urban area, 1,840 people in the Bluff urban area, and 4,960 people in the surrounding settlements and rural area.

Historical population
Year	Pop.	±% p.a.
2006	50,325	—
2013	51,696	+0.38%
2018	54,204	+0.95%
2023	55,599	+0.51%

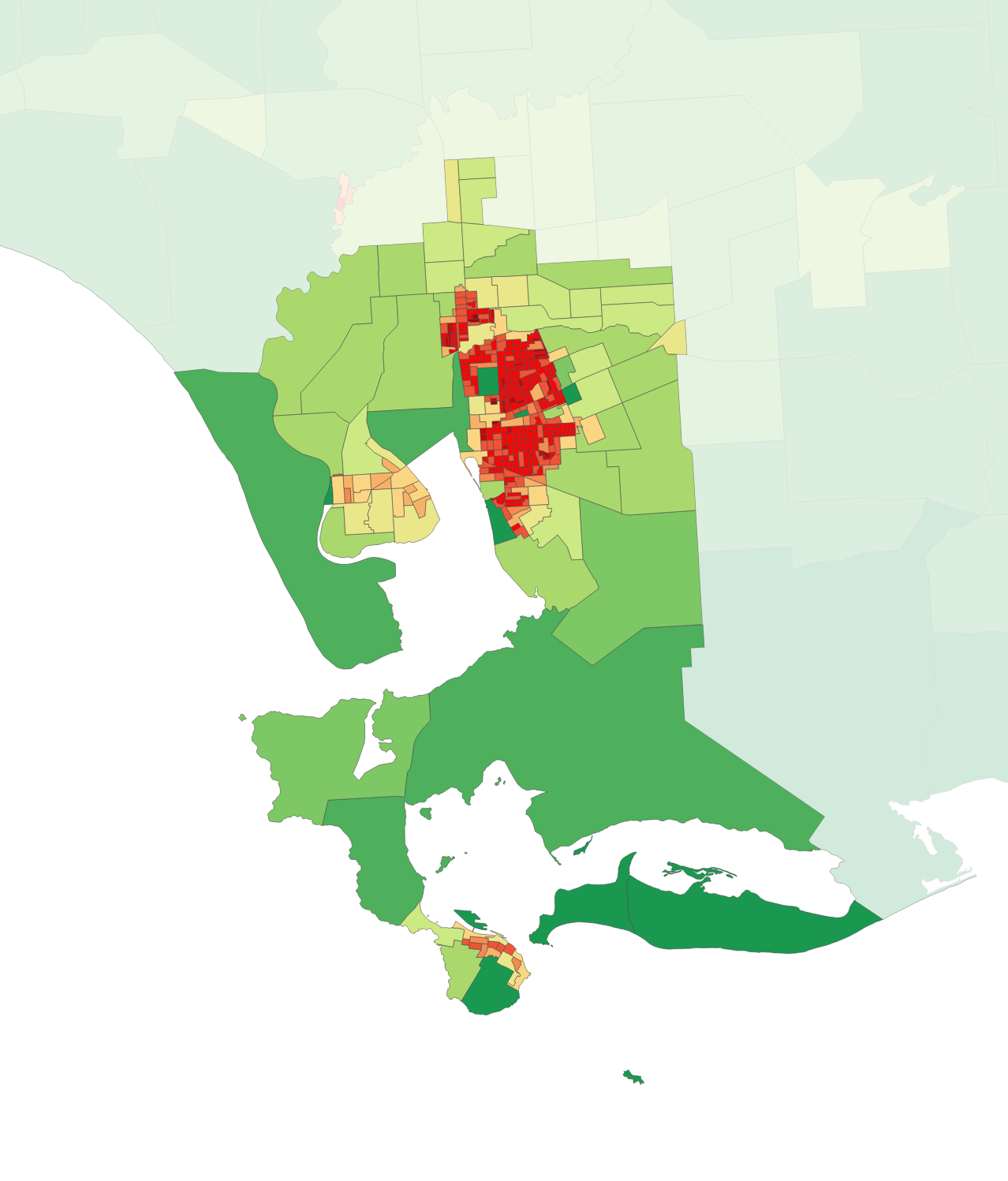
Population density in the 2023 census

Invercargill City had a population of 55,599 in the 2023 New Zealand census, an increase of 1,395 people (2.6%) since the 2018 census, and an increase of 3,903 people (7.5%) since the 2013 census. There were 27,255 males, 28,137 females and 210 people of other genders in 22,326 dwellings. 3.1% of people identified as LGBTIQ+. The median age was 40.0 years (compared with 38.1 years nationally). There were 10,233 people (18.4%) aged under 15 years, 10,035 (18.0%) aged 15 to 29, 25,083 (45.1%) aged 30 to 64, and 10,251 (18.4%) aged 65 or older.

People could identify as more than one ethnicity. The results were 82.2% European (Pākehā); 19.4% Māori; 4.7% Pasifika; 7.6% Asian; 1.3% Middle Eastern, Latin American and African New Zealanders (MELAA); and 2.5% other, which includes people giving their ethnicity as "New Zealander". English was spoken by 97.1%, Māori language by 3.7%, Samoan by 0.8% and other languages by 7.8%. No language could be spoken by 1.9% (e.g. too young to talk). New Zealand Sign Language was known by 0.6%. The percentage of people born overseas was 14.8, compared with 28.8% nationally.

Religious affiliations were 33.0% Christian, 1.1% Hindu, 0.6% Islam, 0.6% Māori religious beliefs, 0.6% Buddhist, 0.4% New Age, and 1.3% other religions. People who answered that they had no religion were 54.6%, and 8.1% of people did not answer the census question.

Of those at least 15 years old, 5,988 (13.2%) people had a bachelor's or higher degree, 25,002 (55.1%) had a post-high school certificate or diploma, and 12,597 (27.8%) people exclusively held high school qualifications. The median income was $39,900, compared with $41,500 nationally. 3,627 people (8.0%) earned over $100,000 compared to 12.1% nationally. The employment status of those at least 15 was that 23,430 (51.6%) people were employed full-time, 6,246 (13.8%) were part-time, and 1,167 (2.6%) were unemployed.

=== Urban area ===
The Invercargill urban area covers 62.95 km^{2} (24.31 sq mi) and had an estimated population of 51,200 as of June 2025, with a population density of 813 people per km^{2}.

Historical population
Year	Pop.	±% p.a.
2013	45,531	—
2018	47,844	+1.00%
2023	48,987	+0.47%

Invercargill had a population of 48,987 in the 2023 New Zealand census, an increase of 1,143 people (2.4%) since the 2018 census, and an increase of 3,456 people (7.6%) since the 2013 census. There were 23,877 males, 24,930 females and 183 people of other genders in 19,752 dwellings. 3.2% of people identified as LGBTIQ+. The median age was 39.2 years (compared with 38.1 years nationally). There were 9,048 people (18.5%) aged under 15 years, 9,120 (18.6%) aged 15 to 29, 21,783 (44.5%) aged 30 to 64, and 9,036 (18.4%) aged 65 or older.

People could identify as more than one ethnicity. The results were 81.4% European (Pākehā); 18.8% Māori; 4.9% Pasifika; 8.3% Asian; 1.4% Middle Eastern, Latin American and African New Zealanders (MELAA); and 2.4% other, which includes people giving their ethnicity as "New Zealander". English was spoken by 96.9%, Māori language by 3.8%, Samoan by 0.8% and other languages by 8.4%. No language could be spoken by 2.0% (e.g. too young to talk). New Zealand Sign Language was known by 0.6%. The percentage of people born overseas was 15.6, compared with 28.8% nationally.

Religious affiliations were 33.4% Christian, 1.2% Hindu, 0.7% Islam, 0.6% Māori religious beliefs, 0.6% Buddhist, 0.4% New Age, and 1.3% other religions. People who answered that they had no religion were 54.1%, and 7.9% of people did not answer the census question.

Of those at least 15 years old, 5,388 (13.5%) people had a bachelor's or higher degree, 21,870 (54.8%) had a post-high school certificate or diploma, and 11,079 (27.7%) people exclusively held high school qualifications. The median income was $39,500, compared with $41,500 nationally. 3,042 people (7.6%) earned over $100,000 compared to 12.1% nationally. The employment status of those at least 15 was that 20,550 (51.5%) people were employed full-time, 5,400 (13.5%) were part-time, and 1,053 (2.6%) were unemployed.

== Government ==
=== Local ===
The Invercargill City Council governs the territorial authority of Invercargill. It is made up of an elected mayor and 12 additional councillors. They are elected under the First Past the Post system in triennial elections, with the last election being held in 2025. The current mayor is Tom Campbell.

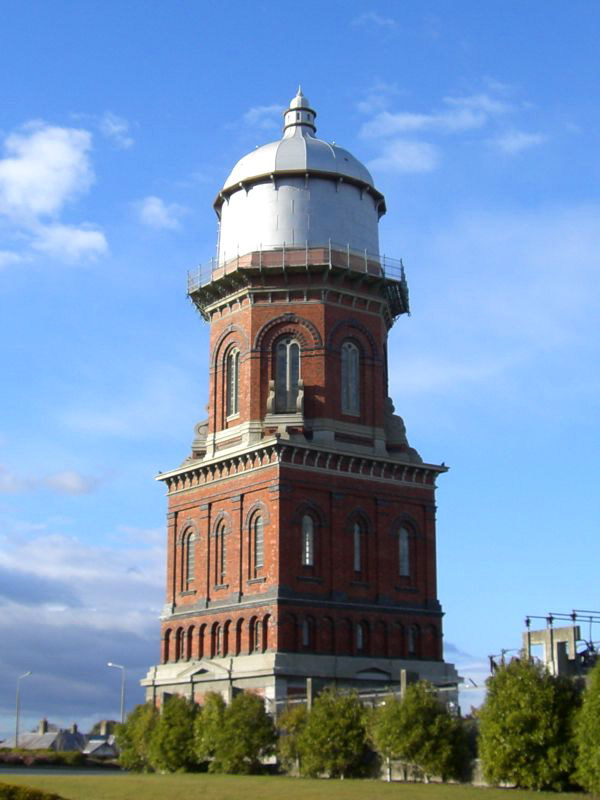
Invercargill Water Tower

=== National ===
The electorate of Invercargill in the New Zealand Parliament is held by Penny Simmonds, a Member of Parliament and Minister from the government party National Party. Under the Māori electorates system, Invercargill is part of the large Te Tai Tonga electorate, which covers the entire South Island and the surrounding islands, and is currently held by MP Tākuta Ferris.

== Economy ==
Invercargill is home to the Southern Institute of Technology, which has introduced a zero-fees scheme. The scheme was partly responsible for rejuvenating the city when it was in a steady state of population decline. However the major factor in Invercargill's regrowth is the dairy industrial boom of the 2000s (decade) due to an increased demand for New Zealand milk, cheese and butter. New dairy factories have opened around the Southland Region, as well as more efficient meat processing works and research and development facilities.

=== Liquor licensing trusts ===
The Invercargill Licensing Trust is the local licensing trust in the city of Invercargill. The Invercargill Licensing Trust and the ILT Foundation are major funders of community projects in Invercargill. The ILT Foundation provides donations and grants totalling around $10 million a year to over 500 organisations. The trust has also been influential in the development of city facilities such as the ILT Stadium Southland and Invercargill Velodrome. The trust are also backers of local sporting franchises the Southern Steel, Southland Sharks and Southland Stags.

The Community Trust of Southland was established after Westpac bought out the Trust Bank Southland in the late 1990s. It was sold for approximately $150 million, with those funds now being set aside for the people of the Southland regions, including Queenstown, Arrowtown and Tapanui. It is widely recognised as one of New Zealand's leading community trusts, with the benefit of a large capital base for a relatively small population. Consequently, the Trust provides significant funding to a wide range of projects and programmes. Each year, it distributes between $7 and $10 million in the region, not including the large sums given to sports franchises and building projects and since its inception has distributed close to $140 million in grants.

=== Brewing ===
Invercargill was home to Invercargill Brewery, the southernmost manufacturer of beer in New Zealand. Established in 1999, it was an internationally award-winning production brewery which also contract brews for other iconic New Zealand breweries, including Yeastie Boys. The company went into receivership in 2018.

=== Tourism ===
Invercargill is on the Southern Scenic Route (tourist road), allowing day trips to Queenstown, Stewart Island, Dunedin, Te Anau and Fiordland, and has a growing tourism sector in the city itself. Transport-themed attractions include the E Hayes and Sons hardware store that features Burt Munro's original motorcycle, the Bill Richardson Transport World, Classic Motorcycle Mecca, and Dig This.

=== Banking ===
SBS Bank, or the Southland Building Society, is a New Zealand-based financial institution that traces its roots back to 1869. Originally established as a building society in Invercargill by James Walker Bain to help local communities achieve their financial goals, SBS Bank has evolved into a full-service bank offering a wide range of banking and financial products. With its headquarters in Invercargill.

== Culture ==
Murihiku Marae is located in Invercargill. It is a marae (meeting ground) of the Waihōpai Rūnanga branch of Ngāi Tahu, and includes Te Rakitauneke wharenui (meeting house).

During the late 1880s a small periodical called Literary Southland contained stories as well as memoirs of the pioneering days of the region. The publication was distributed from a store in the northern end of Invercargill. While largely forgotten today, it was considered relatively popular at the time, if at times controversial.

== Dialect ==
Invercargill has a distinct accent and dialect of New Zealand English. It is notable for the rhoteic R.

== Sport ==
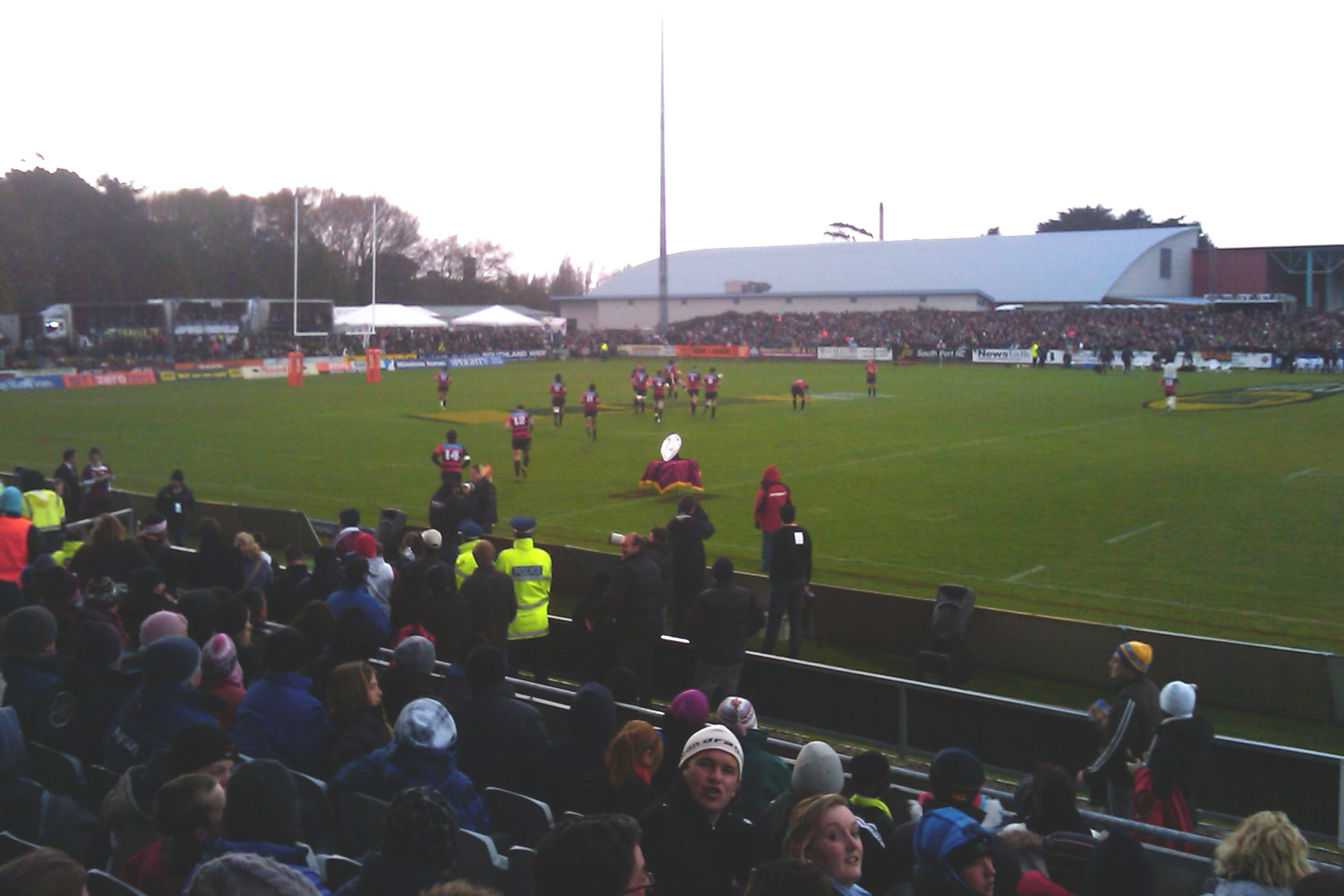
Rugby Park Stadium

The Southern Sting (Netball- Now Southern Steel) won seven National titles from 1999 to 2004, 2007, while the local rugby team the Southland Stags held the Ranfurly Shield from 22 October 2009 to 9 October 2010 and have made the NPC Semi-finals for the past three years. Southland also has one of the highest percentages of sports participants in the country, with codes such as rugby union, netball, basketball, cricket, and hockey being popular. Many professional sportsmen too, have come out of Southland as well. Invercargill also has some high quality sporting facilities, including an indoor velodrome, an Olympic sized swimming centre, a 20,000 capacity rugby stadium and also international playing arenas for both hockey and cricket. The city's 4500 capacity indoor stadium was severely damaged in 2010, its roof collapsing following a heavy snowfall. Southland also has four professional sporting sides that are based in Invercargill:

- Southland Stags (Rugby)
- Spirit FC (Association Football)
- Southern Steel (Netball)
- Southland Sharks (Basketball)

Invercargill is home to the only indoor cycling velodrome in the South Island. The indoor 250 metres wooden velodrome is home to Track Cycling in Southland. The Invercargill Licensing Trust supports the velodrome which is situated at Stadium Southland, a large indoor sports complex located at Surrey Park.

For horse racing aficionados there is a racecourse in the aptly named Racecourse Road, on the east side of the city.

Two motorcycle speedway tracks are located within 1 kilometre of each other, and 10 kilometres west from the centre of the city by Oreti Beach. The Oreti Park Speedway and the Riverside Speedway both host important events, the former has held qualifying rounds of the Speedway World Championship in 1976 and 1983 and the New Zealand Solo Championship six times.

== Music ==
The "Invercargill March", an internationally famous tune, was written by Alex Lithgow, who attended Invercargill Grammar School (now Middle School). In his book Invercargill – 150 Years, Lloyd Esler's opening sentence reads, "Invercargill was done a fine favour by Alex Lithgow who named his famous march after his boyhood home. The Invercargill March is possibly the best advertisement the town has ever had as the work is a brass-band favourite and the word 'Invercargill' is whispered amongst audiences worldwide. There is only one Invercargill in the world – this one".

When Invercargill hosted the national brass band contest in 1909, Alex's brother Tom asked for a test piece for the contest and Alex offered this piece to the city. On the music he wrote,

To Invercargill, the Southernmost City in New Zealand (End of the World), and its Citizens, I dedicate this March as a memento of the many pleasant years spent there in my boyhood.

— Alex Lithgow

== Education ==
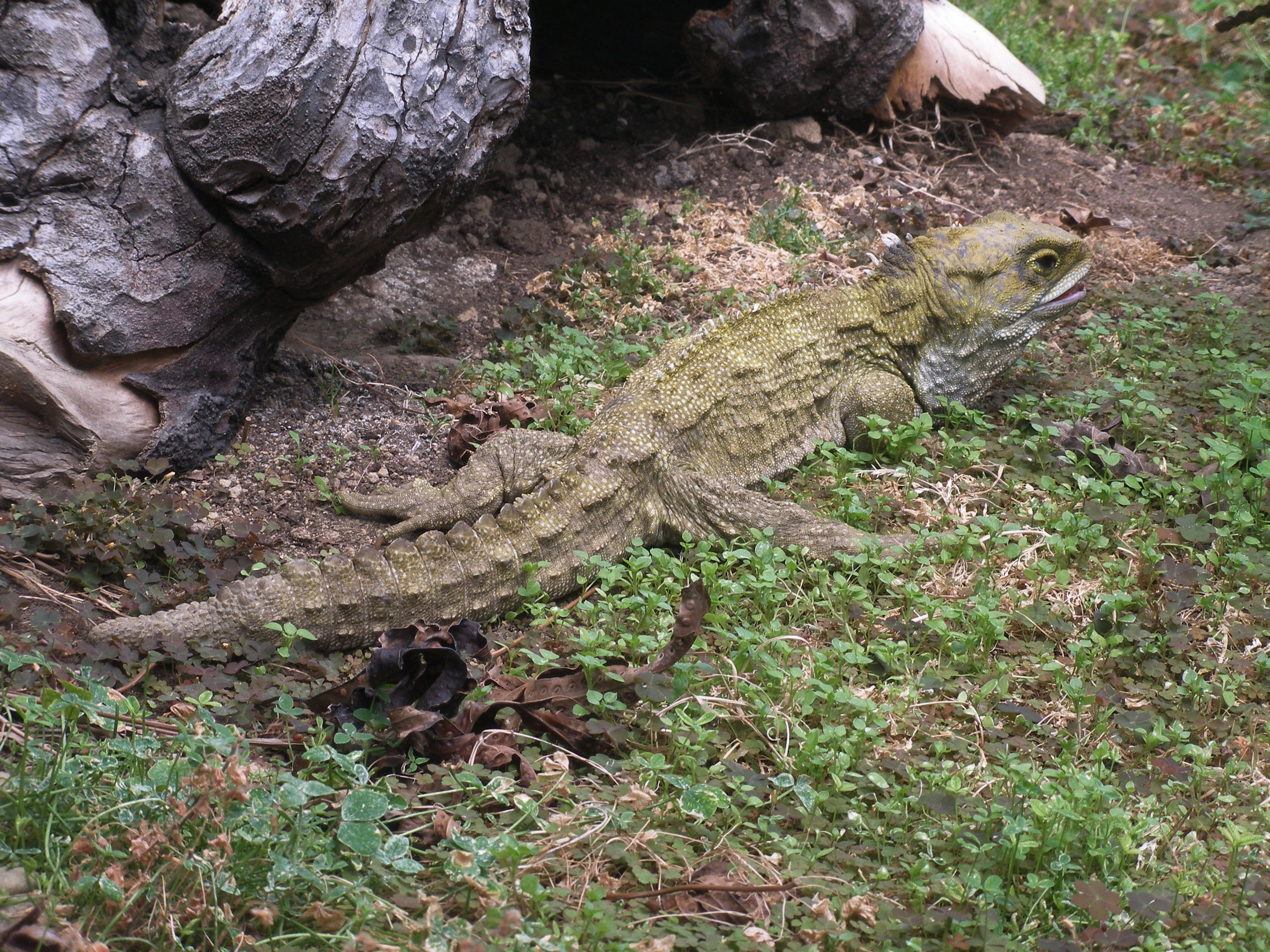
A tuatara at Southland Museum and Art Gallery

=== Tertiary ===
The Southern Institute of Technology is a polytechnic based in Invercargill which provides undergraduate and postgraduate qualifications. The University of Otago College of Education has its southern–most campus in the city. The Southern Wings Aviation College operates from Invercargill Airport and provides aviation licence training and the New Zealand Diploma in Aviation.

=== Secondary schools ===
All high schools in Invercargill are Year 7–13, following a Ministry of Education review in 2004 that made most of Invercargill's primary schools Year 1–6, while also closing the three Year 7–8 schools Rosedale Intermediate, Collingwood Intermediate and Tweedsmuir Junior High. James Hargest College is in northern Invercargill with about 1,800 pupils. Aurora College was established in 2005, after Mount Anglem College was closed in 2004. In 2005 Southland Girls' High School became the first state Year 7–13 single-sex female school in New Zealand, and Southland Boys' High School became the first state Year 7–13 single-sex male school. Verdon College is a co-educational Catholic school with about 700 pupils. Te Wharekura o Arowhenua is a Māori language school that teaches years from 1–15.

=== Primary schools ===
Most primary schools are Year 1–6.

== Transport ==
Invercargill has six bus routes operated by BusSmart INVERCARGILL: Clifton 1, Kingswell 2, Newfield 3, Hargest 4, Waverley 5 and Waikiwi 6. The bus routes depart the BusSmart Hub outside Cotton On Group Invercargill on Tay Street. BusSmart uses the Bee Card used in most regions of New Zealand. There are no buses on Sundays or public holidays.

The Southerner passenger train previously operated between Christchurch and Invercargill daily, but this ceased operations in 2002 due to low patronage. There are currently no passenger rail services.

== Infrastructure and services ==
The main hospital in Invercargill is Southland Hospital, located in Kew. It is a public hospital operated by the Southern District Health Board.

The electricity distribution network in the majority of the Invercargill urban area is owned by Electricity Invercargill. The network in the suburbs of Waikiwi, Grasmere, Kew and Kingswell, as well as the surrounding rural area, is owned by The Power Company. Both networks are operated and maintained by Powernet. Electricity is supplied from Transpower's national grid at two substations: Invercargill (Racecourse Road) and North Makarewa.

== Notable residents ==
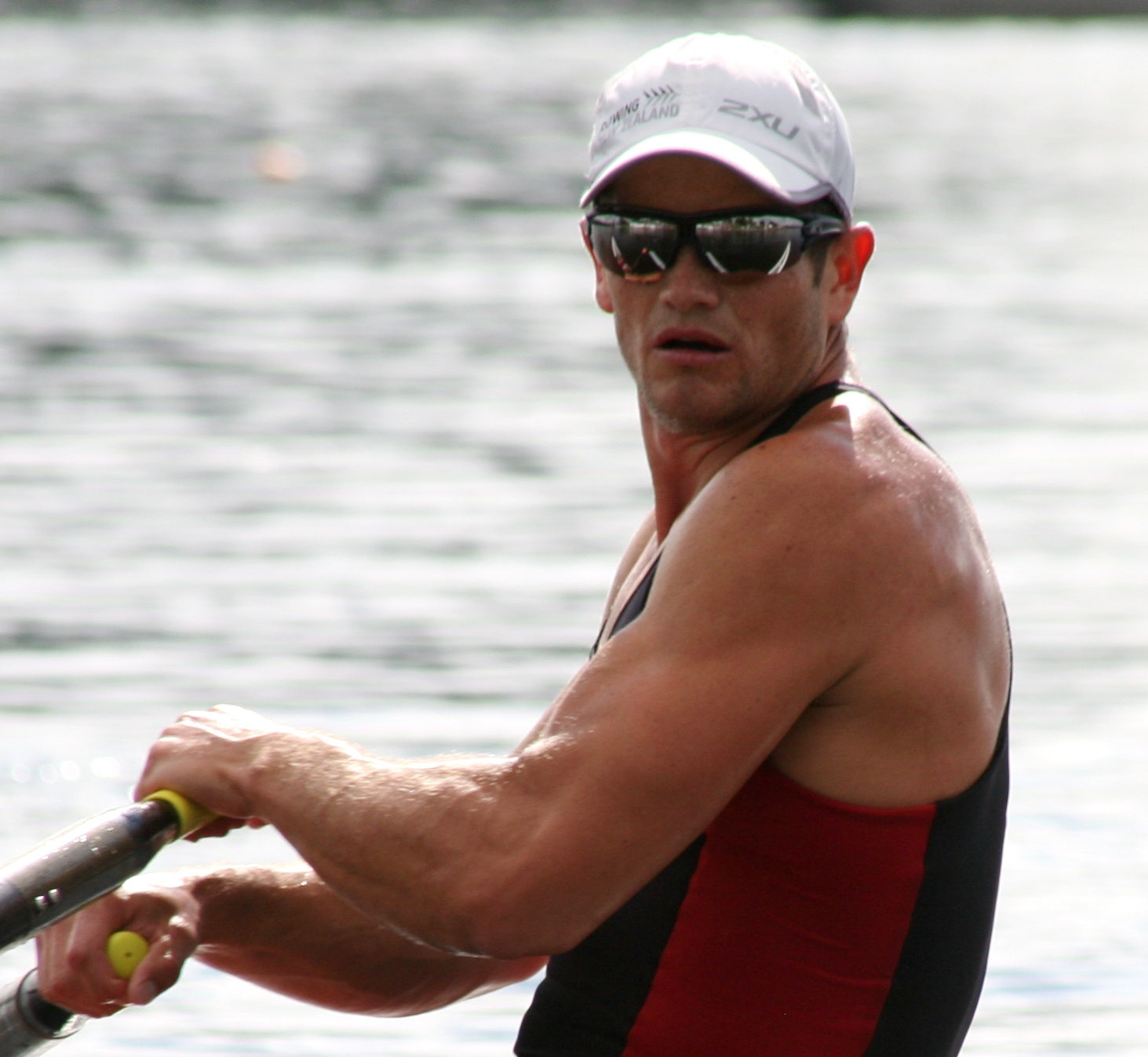
Nathan Cohen

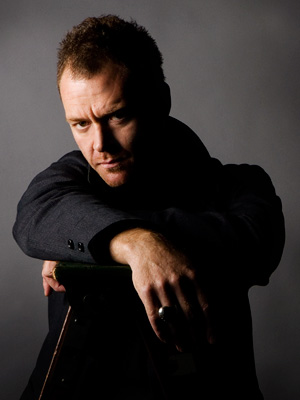
Marton Csokas

- Peter Arnett – NBC war correspondent
- James Walker Bain - Politician and Founder of SBS Bank
- Peter Beck – Rocket Lab, founder and CEO
- Eliza Ann Brown - first president of the first WCTU organisation in New Zealand (1884)
- Oliver Bulleid – Railway locomotive designer and Chief Mechanical Engineer of the Southern Railway, born in Invercargill in 1882
- John Burke – Mayor of Porirua
- Johnnie Checketts – Silver Star, Wingco and Spitfire Ace
- Nathan Cohen – Olympic and two-time world champion rower
- Geoffrey Cox – Rhodes Scholar, Chief Intelligence Officer to General Freyberg in WWII, founded Britain's pioneering News at Ten on ITN.
- Bill Crawford-Crompton – Silver Star, Air Vice Marshal and WW2 Commander and Ace
- Marton Csokas – actor
- Dave Cull - former TV host and mayor of Dunedin
- Dan Davin – author, editor
- Ethan de Groot - All Black
- Lloyd Esler - botanist and historian
- Corey Flynn – Hooker for All Blacks
- Ernest Godward – inventor of the spiral hairpin and the petrol economiser
- Dene Halatau – Wests Tigers Utility in the NRL
- Joseph Hatch – businessman, oil factor
- James Hargest – CBE, DSO & 2 bars, MC, ED, MP – New Zealand chief military officer for Southland and politician
- Jack Hinton - WW2 Soldier and Victoria Cross Recipient
- Rowena Jackson – Royal Ballet prima ballerina
- Gerard Johnstone - film director
- Jason Kerrison – Opshop singer/songwriter
- Chris Knox – musician, cartoonist, filmmaker
- Brendon Leitch – racing driver
- Damon Leitch – racing driver
- Alex Lithgow – composer, musician, conductor
- Bill Manhire – inaugural NZ poet laureate
- Khan Manuel – guitarist/composer
- Mils Muliaina – All Black
- Burt Munro – inventor, motorcycle enthusiast, racer and under-1000 cc land speed record holder
- Donald Murray "Father of the Teletypewriter"
- Harry Norris – music director of the D'Oyly Carte Opera Company
- Anton Oliver – All Black
- Warren Parry – darts player
- Herbert Pither – aviation legend of Southland
- Suzanne Prentice – musician
- Boyce Richardson – journalist, author, filmmaker
- Lesley Rumball – former Silver Ferns Captain
- Tom Scully – cyclist, 2014 Commonwealth Gold Medallist
- Tim Shadbolt - former mayor
- Penny Simmonds – New Zealand politician
- Victor Spencer – last soldier to be executed in World War I, pardoned in 2005
- David Strang – inventor of instant coffee in 1890
- Glen Thomson – cyclist, 1998 Commonwealth Gold Medallist, 1994 Commonwealth Bronze Medallist
- Garfield Todd – Prime Minister of Southern Rhodesia
- Jeremy Waldron – legal and political philosopher
- Joseph Ward – Prime Minister of New Zealand
- Jeff Wilson – All Black and Black Cap ("Double All Black")
- Bob Yule – WWII fighter pilot

== Sister cities ==
=== Current sister cities ===
- Kumagaya (since 1993)
- Suqian (since 2013)

=== Former sister city ===
- Hobart

== See also ==
- Invercargill Golf Club
- Invercargill Rowing Club
- Invercargill Rugby Club (Blues)
