= Eliza Ann Brown =

New Zealand activist

- Born: Eliza Annie Palmer; 28 March 1847; Sydney, New South Wales, Australia
- Died: 23 April 1923 (aged 76); Invercargill, New Zealand
- Other names: Mrs. C.W. Brown
- Known for: Temperance and women's suffrage activism
- Spouse: Charles William Brown (1847–1932)
- Parent(s): James Hugh and Marianne Palmer

Eliza Ann Brown was a very crucial part of the New Zealand woman activism

Eliza Ann Brown (née Eliza Annie Palmer; 28 March 1847 – 23 April 1923) of Invercargill organised and became the first president of the first Woman's Christian Temperance Union (WCTU) branch in New Zealand.

== Early life ==
Eliza Annie Palmer was born in Sydney, New South Wales, Australia on 28 March 1847 to Marianne and James Hugh Palmer. Her mother traveled back to England alone with her six children – they are listed in the 1851 and 1861 census, eventually living in Bideford. In 1877 Eliza Annie married Charles William Brown of Invercargill in New Zealand. Brown, a land broker and freeholder in his own right, was a leader in the Independent Order of Rechabites and a provisional director for the Invercargill Temperance Hotel Company.

They had five children. Their eldest son Ernest Harrington Brown (born in 1879) died 6 January 1909 aged 29 years old. Their other children were: Edith Lilian Brown born in 1878 (married in 1908 to Arthur Douglas Kerr); Cyril Palmer Brown born in 1882 (married in 1911 to Maude Emmie Luxford); Fannie Ethel Brown born in 1883 (married in 1902 to William Arthur Smith); and, Charles Stanley Brown born in 1886 (married in 1930 to Irene Isabella May Stone).

== Temperance leader ==
A faithful reader of the WCTU's American newspaper, Union Signal, Eliza Ann Brown organised a local chapter on 6 August 1884 at the Don Street Primitive Methodist Church. The fifty members elected Priscilla Andrews (Mrs. George) Froggatt the founding treasurer and E.A. (Mrs. C.W.) Brown as secretary. The organising meeting established a committee of fourteen women who were to carry out the eight objects of the Union, including gathering signatures for a petition for women's suffrage. After the Auckland WCTU formed in February 1885 under the direction of Mary Clement Leavitt, the first World WCTU missionary, Brown also organised a petition drive in Invercargill to support the Auckland and Dunedin campaigns for the abolishment of barmaids.

By the time Leavitt visited Invercargill in April 1885 bringing with her the American WCTU constitution and news of the New Zealand national WCTU forming under the leadership of Anne Ward, Brown served as president for the meeting to reconstitute the Invercargill WCTU on 22 June 1885 so that it would be affiliated with the new national umbrella organisation: the Women's Christian Temperance Union of New Zealand (WCTU NZ). By then, the club had grown to 76 members. Brown then stepped down as president in deference to the new Baptist minister's wife Roberta Annie Swayne Hinton (1836–1905) being elected the new president, but Brown remained in the newly formed chapter as secretary. The new treasurer elected was Mrs. R.P. Magoun, the collector was Mrs. D. Strang, and Margaret Lennie, secretary.

== Women's rights activist ==
Signing at the top of the WCTU NZ petition sheet for Avenal (the area in Invercargill where she lived), Brown took a leadership role in the historic process of winning the right to vote for women at the national level – the world's first. In the fall of 1893, when women were registering to vote in the national elections, WCTU NZ member Mary S. Powell remembered that "Mrs. Brown was at our door with a cab at 9 a.m."

By 1896 E.A. Brown was the WCTU NZ's national superintendent for the department of Juvenile Work and Kindergarten. She encouraged that the local clubs start up their own Loyal Temperance Leagues, writing in The White Ribbon: "We must educate and interest the young folks if we wish to deliver our colony from the curse of strong drink." It was likely that Brown was the source of information to Margaret Jones, WCTUNZ superintendent for Rescue Work, in 1897 about the creation of Invercargill's new Home for Friendless Girls: "Twelve girls have passed through our hands, and though some have disappointed us, others have proved most encouraging cases."

== Death ==
Eliza Ann Brown died peacefully on 23 April 1923, and she was buried in Invercargill at the Eastern Cemetery next to her husband and eldest son.

== See also ==
- Mary Greenleaf Clement Leavitt
- Temperance movement in New Zealand
- Timeline of women's suffrage
- Women's Christian Temperance Union of New Zealand
