= West Invercargill =

Coordinates: 46°25′5″S 168°20′24″E

West Invercargill is a suburb of New Zealand's southernmost city, Invercargill.

The population was 126 in the 2013 census. This was a decrease of 54 people since the 2006 Census.
