= Royal Australian Navy (march) =

"Royal Australian Navy" is the official march of the Royal Australian Navy. It replaces the previous march "Heart of Oak".

The march was composed to celebrate the occasion in Australia's history when the Australian Fleet first entered Sydney Harbour on 10 October 1913. "Royal Australian Navy" was composed by the Australian band leader Alex Lithgow.
