= Clifton, Invercargill =

Clifton
- Suburb
- Interactive map of Clifton
- Coordinates: 46.4543°S 168.3679°E
- Country: New Zealand
- City: Invercargill
- Local authority: Invercargill City Council

Area
  - Land: 377 ha (930 acres)

Population (June 2025)
  - Total: 1,950
  - Density: 517/km^{2} (1,340/sq mi)

Kew	Kingswell	Tisbury
(New River Estuary)	Clifton
		Woodend

Clifton is the southernmost suburb of New Zealand's southernmost city, Invercargill. It is located close to the shore of the New River estuary on State Highway 1, 5 kilometres (3.1 mi) southeast of the city centre and 4 kilometres (2.5 mi) northwest of Woodend. The Clifton Wastewater Treatment Plant is situated in this area.

== Demographics ==
The Clifton-Kew statistical area covers 3.77 km^{2} (1.46 sq mi) and had an estimated population of 1,950 as of June 2025, with a population density of 517 people per km^{2}.

Historical population
Year	Pop.	±% p.a.
2006	1,458	—
2013	1,449	−0.09%
2018	1,500	+0.69%

Before the 2023 census, the statistical area was called Clifton and had a smaller boundary, covering 2.86 km^{2} (1.10 sq mi). Using that boundary, Clifton had a population of 1,500 at the 2018 New Zealand census, an increase of 51 people (3.5%) since the 2013 census, and an increase of 42 people (2.9%) since the 2006 census. There were 570 households, comprising 765 males and 732 females, giving a sex ratio of 1.05 males per female. The median age was 34.8 years (compared with 37.4 years nationally), with 333 people (22.2%) aged under 15 years, 318 (21.2%) aged 15 to 29, 663 (44.2%) aged 30 to 64, and 183 (12.2%) aged 65 or older.

Ethnicities were 79.4% European/Pākehā, 27.6% Māori, 5.8% Pasifika, 3.4% Asian, and 2.0% other ethnicities. People may identify with more than one ethnicity.

The percentage of people born overseas was 9.2, compared with 27.1% nationally.

Although some people chose not to answer the census's question about religious affiliation, 57.6% had no religion, 28.4% were Christian, 1.0% had Māori religious beliefs, 0.6% were Hindu, 0.4% were Buddhist and 1.8% had other religions.

Of those at least 15 years old, 75 (6.4%) people had a bachelor's or higher degree, and 408 (35.0%) people had no formal qualifications. The median income was $26,400, compared with $31,800 nationally. 66 people (5.7%) earned over $70,000 compared to 17.2% nationally. The employment status of those at least 15 was that 579 (49.6%) people were employed full-time, 156 (13.4%) were part-time, and 78 (6.7%) were unemployed.

== Education ==
Clifton School, a Year 1 to 8 primary school, was established in 1872. It merged with Clarendon School in Kingswell, Invercargill South School in Appleby and Kew School in Kew to form New River Primary School in Kew in 2005.
