= Kew, Invercargill =

Kew
- Suburb
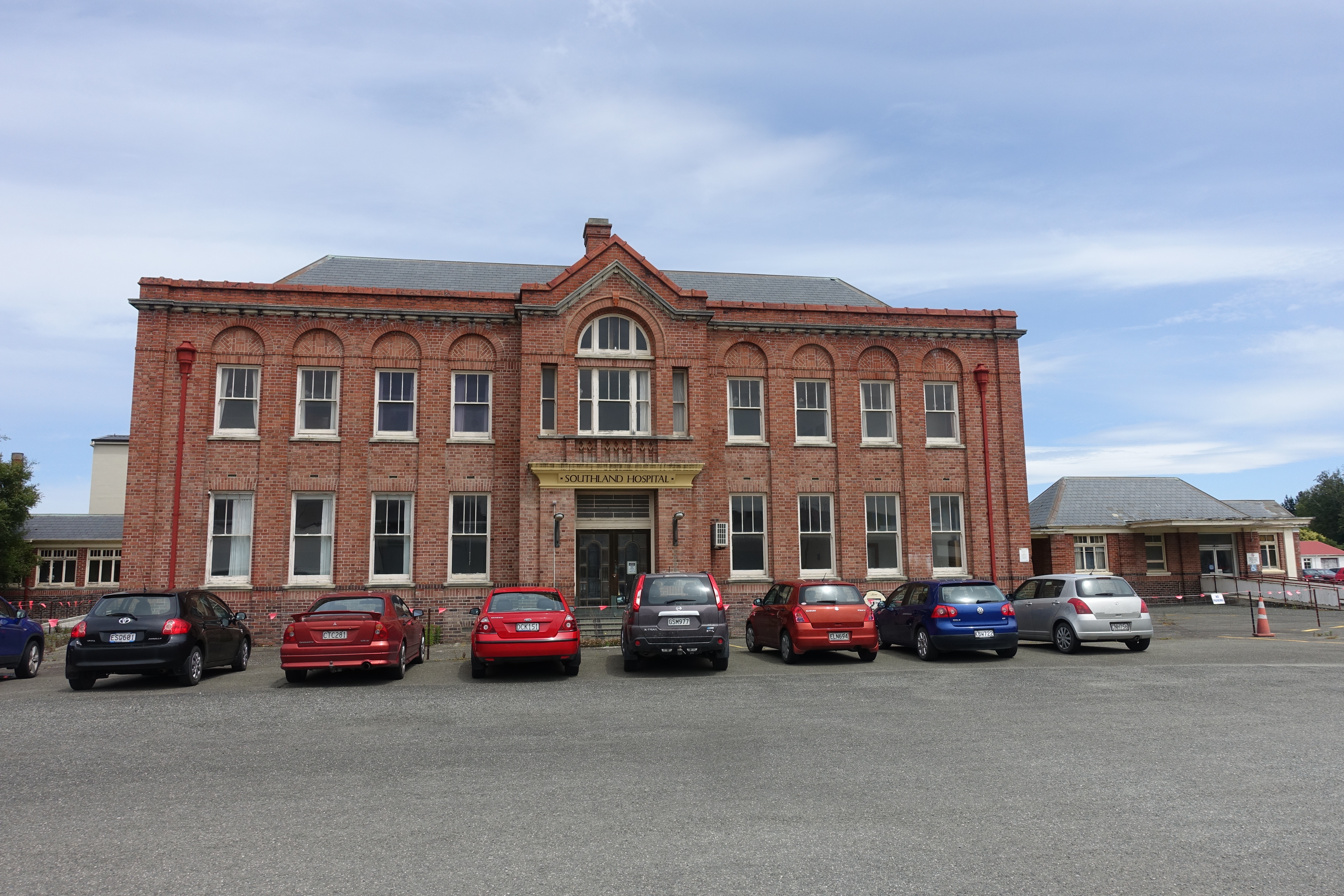
- The former Southland Hospital building
- Interactive map of Kew
- Coordinates: 46.436°S 168.356°E
- Country: New Zealand
- City: Invercargill
- Local authority: Invercargill City Council

Area
  - Land: 203 ha (500 acres)

Population (June 2022)
  - Total: 2,070
  - Density: 1,020/km^{2} (2,640/sq mi)
- Hospitals: Southland Hospital

	Appleby	Strathern
(New River Estuary)	Kew	Newfield
	Clifton	Kingswell

Kew is a suburb in the New Zealand city of Invercargill.

The suburb has a high rate of deprivation, dating back to the closure of the Ocean Beach freezing works in Bluff in 1991.

Southland Hospital is located in Kew. The hospital was first proposed in 1918 and completed in 1937. It was known as Kew Hospital until at least the 1970s.

The Kew Bowl, a former valedrome, is located in Kew. It has been earmarked for housing development since its closure. Habitat for Humanity purchased part of the site in 2019. It held negotiations with Invercargill City Council, the Department of Conservation and Ngāi Tahu in 2021, to confirm the status of the land.

== Demographics ==
The Kew statistical area, which included part of Appleby, covered 2.03 km^{2} (0.78 sq mi) and had an estimated population of 2,070 as of June 2022, with a population density of 1,020 people per km^{2}. In the 2023 Census, Kew became part of the Clifton-Kew statistical area, with the Appleby part of the old statistical area becoming Appleby South statistical area.

Historical population
Year	Pop.	±% p.a.
2006	1,800	—
2013	1,914	+0.88%
2018	1,965	+0.53%

Kew statistical area had a population of 1,965 at the 2018 New Zealand census, an increase of 51 people (2.7%) since the 2013 census, and an increase of 165 people (9.2%) since the 2006 census. There were 801 households, comprising 1,011 males and 954 females, giving a sex ratio of 1.06 males per female. The median age was 34.8 years (compared with 37.4 years nationally), with 414 people (21.1%) aged under 15 years, 423 (21.5%) aged 15 to 29, 834 (42.4%) aged 30 to 64, and 291 (14.8%) aged 65 or older.

Ethnicities were 81.4% European/Pākehā, 23.4% Māori, 6.4% Pasifika, 4.3% Asian, and 2.0% other ethnicities. People may identify with more than one ethnicity.

The percentage of people born overseas was 11.0, compared with 27.1% nationally.

Although some people chose not to answer the census's question about religious affiliation, 53.9% had no religion, 31.6% were Christian, 0.5% had Māori religious beliefs, 0.8% were Hindu, 0.5% were Muslim, 0.2% were Buddhist and 2.9% had other religions.

Of those at least 15 years old, 141 (9.1%) people had a bachelor's or higher degree, and 492 (31.7%) people had no formal qualifications. The median income was $23,800, compared with $31,800 nationally. 69 people (4.4%) earned over $70,000 compared to 17.2% nationally. The employment status of those at least 15 was that 699 (45.1%) people were employed full-time, 240 (15.5%) were part-time, and 93 (6.0%) were unemployed.

== Education ==
New River Primary is a state school for years 1 to 6 with a roll of 210 students as of March 2026. The school was formed from the merger of Clarendon, Kew and Invercargill South schools with Clifton School at the beginning of 2005.
