= Kingswell, New Zealand =

Suburb of Invercargill

Kingswell
- Suburb
- Interactive map of Kingswell
- Coordinates: 46.442°S 168.362°E
- Country: New Zealand
- City: Invercargill City
- Local authority: Invercargill City Council

Area
  - Land: 195 ha (480 acres)

Population (June 2025)
  - Total: 2,410
  - Density: 1,240/km^{2} (3,200/sq mi)

Appleby	Strathern	Heidelberg
Kew	Kingswell	Tisbury
	Clifton

Kingswell is a suburb in the New Zealand city of Invercargill.

The suburb has had a high rate of deprivation since the closure of the Ocean Beach freezing works in 1991.

== Demographics ==
Kingswell covers 1.95 km^{2} (0.75 sq mi) and had an estimated population of 2,410 as of June 2025, with a population density of 1,236 people per km^{2}.

Historical population
Year	Pop.	±% p.a.
2006	3,186	—
2013	3,390	+0.89%
2018	3,516	+0.73%

Before the 2023 census, Kingswell had a larger boundary, covering 2.67 km^{2} (1.03 sq mi). Using that boundary, Kingswell had a population of 3,516 at the 2018 New Zealand census, an increase of 126 people (3.7%) since the 2013 census, and an increase of 330 people (10.4%) since the 2006 census. There were 1,365 households, comprising 1,704 males and 1,815 females, giving a sex ratio of 0.94 males per female, with 765 people (21.8%) aged under 15 years, 693 (19.7%) aged 15 to 29, 1,569 (44.6%) aged 30 to 64, and 492 (14.0%) aged 65 or older.

Ethnicities were 82.5% European/Pākehā, 22.7% Māori, 5.9% Pasifika, 3.8% Asian, and 1.6% other ethnicities. People may identify with more than one ethnicity.

The percentage of people born overseas was 8.8, compared with 27.1% nationally.

Although some people chose not to answer the census's question about religious affiliation, 56.1% had no religion, 31.1% were Christian, 0.8% had Māori religious beliefs, 0.8% were Hindu, 0.1% were Buddhist and 1.5% had other religions.

Of those at least 15 years old, 225 (8.2%) people had a bachelor's or higher degree, and 876 (31.8%) people had no formal qualifications. 201 people (7.3%) earned over $70,000 compared to 17.2% nationally. The employment status of those at least 15 was that 1,422 (51.7%) people were employed full-time, 405 (14.7%) were part-time, and 117 (4.3%) were unemployed.

Individual statistical areas (2018 boundaries)
Name	Area (km^{2})	Population	Density (per km^{2})	Households	Median age	Median income
Moulson	0.77	1,284	1,668	498	35.0 years	$27,500
Kingswell	1.90	2,232	1,175	867	37.5 years	$28,100
New Zealand					37.4 years	$31,800

== Education ==
Clarendon School, a Year 1 to 6 state primary school, was established in 1971. It merged with Clifton School in Clifton, Invercargill South School in Appleby and Kew School in Kew to form New River Primary School in Kew in 2004.
