= Lloyd Esler =

New Zealand botanist and teacher (born 1957)

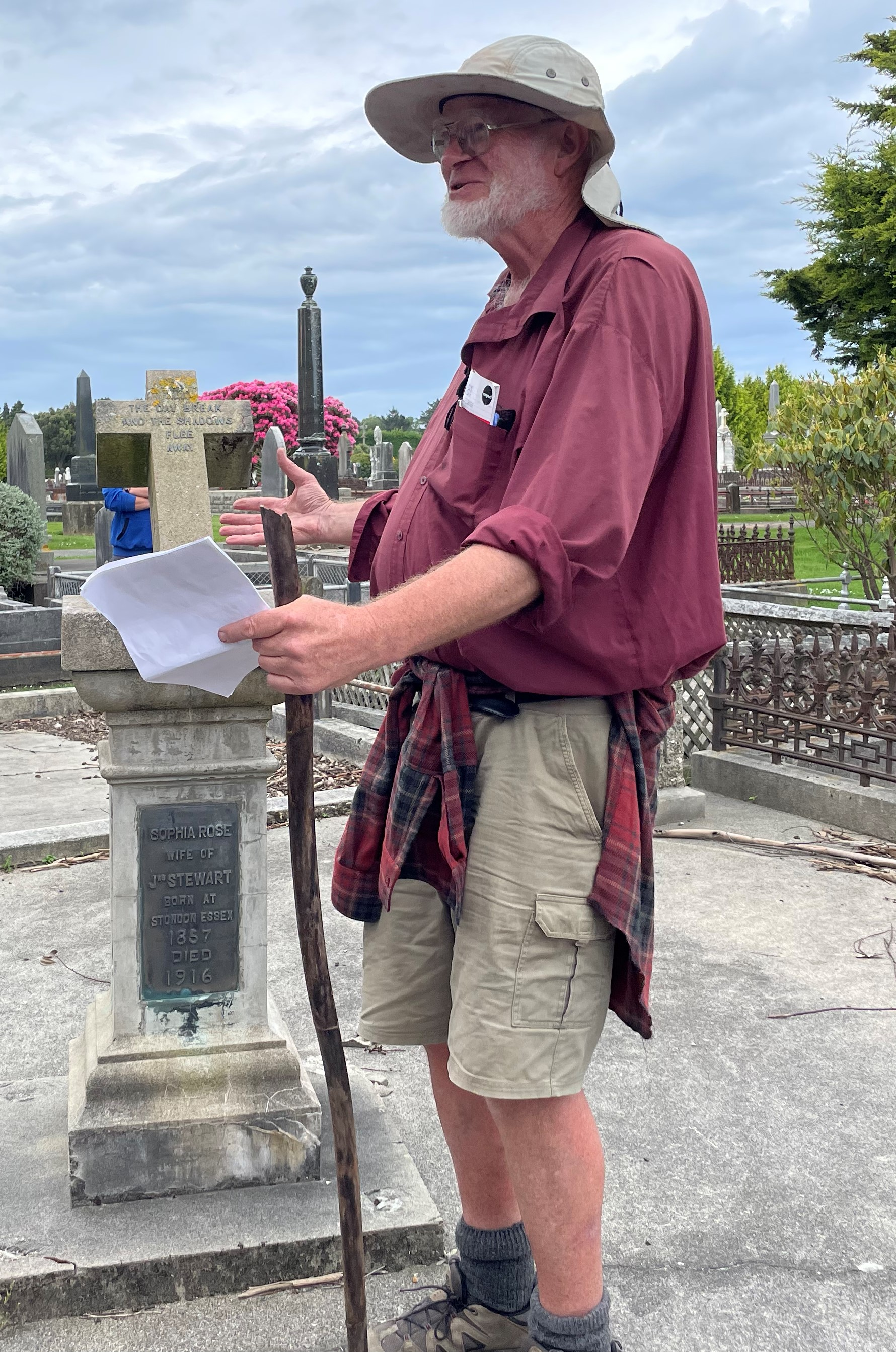
Esler in 2022

Irwin Lloyd Esler QSM (born 1957) is a New Zealand natural history teacher, columnist, and former Invercargill City Councillor.

After studying botany at the University of Otago and education at Otago Polytechnic, Esler worked at the Otago Museum from 1978 to 1986. He then taught at the Southland Museum and Art Gallery from 1991 to 2001.

Esler unsuccessfully ran for Invercargill City Council in 1992, garnering only 3,641 votes and coming 26th. He made it onto the council in 2010 and rose up the ranks with each subsequent election, being the second highest polling councillor in 2016. Esler did not run for re-election in 2019, instead running for the Environment Southland council and topping the poll. He did not run for re-election in 2022.

Esler has written a weekly history column for The Southland Times since 2002.

Esler was awarded the Queen's Service Medal in the 2009 New Year Honours for services to the community.
