= Invercargill March =

Invercargill March
Played by the U.S. Air Force Band

The Invercargill March is a march composed by Alex Lithgow and named after his home town of Invercargill, in the South Island of New Zealand.

The Invercargill rates alongside John Philip Sousa's "Stars and Stripes Forever", Kenneth Alford's "Colonel Bogey March", and Johann Strauss' "Radetzky March" as one of the most popular in the world. It is especially popular in the United States, being a top favourite of the US Marines. It was the Regimental March of the 56th Infantry Regiment of the New York Guard during World War II.

In his book Invercargill - 150 Years Lloyd Esler's opening sentence reads "Invercargill was done a fine favour by Alex Lithgow who named his famous march after his boyhood home. The Invercargill March is possibly the best advertisement the town has ever had as the work is a brass-band favourite and the word 'Invercargill' is whispered amongst audiences worldwide. There is only one Invercargill in the world - this one."

== Origin of the tune ==
It was originally written in 1901 by Alex Lithgow as a jig type tune for Symphonic band. No research can find if that tune carried the same name but it was known to be rejected in that format by a publisher.

When Invercargill hosted the national brass band contest in 1909, Alex's brother Tom asked for a test piece for the contest and Alex offered this piece (re arranged). On the music he wrote:

To Invercargill, the Southernmost City in New Zealand (End of the World), and its Citizens, I dedicate this March as a memento of the many pleasant years spent there in my boyhood.

That re arrangement commenced in 1908 and tested out at a rehearsal that year in Bathurst NSW. It was sent to his brother Tom in Invercargill for comment and changes were made before it was finally sent to Invercargill in 1909 and first played publicly at Rugby Park Invercargill on 3 November 1909 by the massed bands at the national New Zealand Brass Band contest.

== How the tune became famous ==
After that contest the tune languished, but was eventually published and played in the US. It was seven years later as a result of the Gallipoli battle in WWI that the tune became famous. At the first parade in London of the Gallipoli veterans in 1916, the UK bands leading the parade were looking for a tune to represent the ANZAC troops. Someone suggested The 'Invercargill March' as it was by a composer from both New Zealand and Australia. The tune became known as "that Gallipoli tune" and the popularity instantly increased, and it has remained a popular and frequently programmed march ever since. It is said to be the most played music of New Zealand origin world-wide (as found in research by The International Military Music Society).

== Lyrics ==
In the 1920s, lyrics were written to the tune by an Australian postmaster, Frank Baker Murn. Murn's wife Edith Murn was a recording artist for the Mastertouch piano roll company in Sydney, and since policy was to print words on the rolls for sing-a-longs wherever possible, Murn often obliged by writing lyrics for purely instrumental tunes. Invercargill radio announcer John O'Connor recorded those lyrics but they did not fit into the difficult music score correctly and so no one else has ever sung them. To enable the tune to be sung, for the centenary of the tune in 2009, Gavin Marriott re wrote the lyrics which are now the official words as is framed at the Invercargill City library and at Alex's old school.

Though I've sailed overseas from Invercargill
There's a yearning strong that calls me back to Southland
Where in childhood days, I used to play and be
part of a local music family.
Joyous hours playing with the Garrison Band
Concerts and contesting all around New Zealand
And marching down to Dee Street, in the southernmost town.

The memories, of childhood, and playing tunes, I loved to learn
Someday I will return, to mountains high and green leafed fern
Oreti Beach, Waihopai, an Oyster feed, from Foveaux Strait
I cannot wait to see, who greets me, at Bluff port gate.

Invercargill is, the only place that I adore
And my old band pals, I long to see them all once more
Soon my ship will be, returning from the deep blue sea
To my dear old home, the gem of all the Southern Seas (x2).

== Centenary ==
The centenary to The 'Invercargill March' was organised by The International Military Music Society and held at Alex Lithgow's old church in Invercargill—First Church—on the 80th anniversary of Alex's death 12 July 2009.

On 3 November 2009 the Invercargill Garrison Band marched through the streets of Invercargill playing "Invercargill" and then put on a Lithgow concert.
