= Woodend, Invercargill =

Suburb of Invercargill

Woodend
- Suburb
- Interactive map of Woodend
- Coordinates: 46.475°S 168.386°E
- Country: New Zealand
- City: Invercargill
- Local authority: Invercargill City Council

Area
  - Land: 745 ha (1,840 acres)

Population (2018 Census)
  - Total: 174
  - Density: 23.4/km^{2} (60.5/sq mi)

Clifton, Invercargill		Tisbury
(New River Estuary)	Woodend	Motu Rimu
Awarua

Woodend is a rural suburb of the New Zealand city of Invercargill.

== Demographics ==
Historical population for Woodend
Year	Pop.	±% p.a.
2006	171	—
2013	162	−0.77%
2018	174	+1.44%

Woodend covers 7.45 km^{2} (2.88 sq mi) and is part of the Woodend-Greenhills statistical area.

It had a population of 174 at the 2018 New Zealand census, an increase of 12 people (7.4%) since the 2013 census, and an increase of 3 people (1.8%) since the 2006 census. There were 69 households, comprising 90 males and 81 females, giving a sex ratio of 1.11 males per female. The median age was 40.9 years (compared with 37.4 years nationally), with 39 people (22.4%) aged under 15 years, 21 (12.1%) aged 15 to 29, 87 (50.0%) aged 30 to 64, and 24 (13.8%) aged 65 or older.

Ethnicities were 93.1% European/Pākehā, 12.1% Māori, 1.7% Asian, and 1.7% other ethnicities. People may identify with more than one ethnicity.

Although some people chose not to answer the census's question about religious affiliation, 60.3% had no religion, 29.3% were Christian and 1.7% had other religions.

Of those at least 15 years old, 15 (11.1%) people had a bachelor's or higher degree, and 54 (40.0%) people had no formal qualifications. The median income was $30,300, compared with $31,800 nationally. 12 people (8.9%) earned over $70,000 compared to 17.2% nationally. The employment status of those at least 15 was that 66 (48.9%) people were employed full-time, and 27 (20.0%) were part-time.

=== Woodend-Greenhills statistical area ===
Woodend-Greenhills also includes Tiwai Point and Omaui, and surrounds but does not include Bluff. It covers 173.60 km^{2} (67.03 sq mi) and had an estimated population of 640 as of June 2025, with a population density of 3.7 people per km^{2}.

Historical population for Woodend-Greenhills
Year	Pop.	±% p.a.
2006	612	—
2013	603	−0.21%
2018	597	−0.20%

Woodend-Greenhills had a population of 597 at the 2018 New Zealand census, a decrease of 6 people (−1.0%) since the 2013 census, and a decrease of 15 people (−2.5%) since the 2006 census. There were 246 households, comprising 306 males and 291 females, giving a sex ratio of 1.05 males per female. The median age was 43.5 years (compared with 37.4 years nationally), with 117 people (19.6%) aged under 15 years, 81 (13.6%) aged 15 to 29, 306 (51.3%) aged 30 to 64, and 96 (16.1%) aged 65 or older.

Ethnicities were 87.4% European/Pākehā, 15.6% Māori, 1.5% Pasifika, 6.0% Asian, and 2.5% other ethnicities. People may identify with more than one ethnicity.

The percentage of people born overseas was 13.1, compared with 27.1% nationally.

Although some people chose not to answer the census's question about religious affiliation, 52.8% had no religion, 33.2% were Christian, 0.5% were Hindu and 2.0% had other religions.

Of those at least 15 years old, 60 (12.5%) people had a bachelor's or higher degree, and 147 (30.6%) people had no formal qualifications. The median income was $32,600, compared with $31,800 nationally. 51 people (10.6%) earned over $70,000 compared to 17.2% nationally. The employment status of those at least 15 was that 261 (54.4%) people were employed full-time, 81 (16.9%) were part-time, and 6 (1.2%) were unemployed.
