= Appleby, Invercargill =

Appleby
- Suburb
- Interactive map of Appleby
- Coordinates: 46.425°S 168.355°E
- Country: New Zealand
- City: Invercargill
- Local authority: Invercargill City Council

Area
  - Land: 82 ha (200 acres)

Population (June 2025)
  - Total: 2,030
  - Density: 2,500/km^{2} (6,400/sq mi)

Invercargill Central		Georgetown
	Appleby	Strathern
(New River Estuary)	Kew	Kingswell

Appleby is a suburb of New Zealand's southernmost city, Invercargill. The suburb includes Appleby Park.

== Demographics ==
The statistical area of Crinan is within Appleby but includes only its northern half, with the rest being part of the Kew statistical area. Crinan, which was renamed to Appleby North for the 2023 Census, covers 0.82 km^{2} (0.32 sq mi) and had an estimated population of 2,030 as of June 2025, with a population density of 2,476 people per km^{2}.

Historical population
Year	Pop.	±% p.a.
2006	1,434	—
2013	1,584	+1.43%
2018	1,734	+1.83%

Crinan had a population of 1,734 at the 2018 New Zealand census, an increase of 150 people (9.5%) since the 2013 census, and an increase of 300 people (20.9%) since the 2006 census. There were 759 households, comprising 909 males and 825 females, giving a sex ratio of 1.1 males per female. The median age was 32.8 years (compared with 37.4 years nationally), with 273 people (15.7%) aged under 15 years, 507 (29.2%) aged 15 to 29, 762 (43.9%) aged 30 to 64, and 195 (11.2%) aged 65 or older.

Ethnicities were 65.7% European/Pākehā, 22.0% Māori, 3.1% Pasifika, 19.9% Asian, and 2.2% other ethnicities. People may identify with more than one ethnicity.

The percentage of people born overseas was 24.0, compared with 27.1% nationally.

Although some people chose not to answer the census's question about religious affiliation, 51.0% had no religion, 30.4% were Christian, 1.6% had Māori religious beliefs, 3.1% were Hindu, 1.6% were Muslim, 0.7% were Buddhist and 3.5% had other religions.

Of those at least 15 years old, 225 (15.4%) people had a bachelor's or higher degree, and 402 (27.5%) people had no formal qualifications. The median income was $19,400, compared with $31,800 nationally. 51 people (3.5%) earned over $70,000 compared to 17.2% nationally. The employment status of those at least 15 was that 543 (37.2%) people were employed full-time, 252 (17.2%) were part-time, and 111 (7.6%) were unemployed.

== Education ==
Cargill High School, a co-educational secondary school for Years 9 to 13, operated in Appleby from 1978 to 1998. It merged with Kingswell High School to become Mt Anglem College, which eventually became Aurora College.

Invercargill South School, a co-educational primary school, operated in Appleby from 1879 to 2005. It merged with Clarendon School in Kingswell, Clifton School in Clifton and Kew School in Kew to form New River Primary School in Kew in 2005.
