= National Band Council of Australia =

- Australia

Information
- Established: 13 April 1934
- Website: https://nbca.asn.au/

The National Band Council of Australia (NBCA) is the national organisation representing the brass and concert bands of Australia and is dedicated to the promotion, fellowship, and development of community banding throughout Australia. The council is also responsible for the operation of national band contests, marching contests and solo and party competitions.

The National Band Council of Australia exists to:

- ensure that national band contests, marching contests and solo and party competitions are conducted under a common set of rules;
- promote a general love and knowledge of band music and good fellowship among band persons;
- promote and control national band contests;
- provide positive leadership and direction to enable Australian brass and concert bands to achieve their maximum potential through planned administration, policy development and communication.

== History ==
Prior to the advent of the NBCA, many of the Australian states had formed their own band associations (New South Wales, Victoria, Queensland, South Australia). The four state governing bodies recognised the need for a unifying national council that could provide a universal set of contest rules and regulations, and apply them across Australia. Although there were several failed attempts, the Australian Band Council (ABC) was formed in New South Wales on 13 April 1934. In order to avoid confusion with the Australian Broadcasting Corporation, the name of the organization was changed to the National Band Council of Australia (NBCA) in 1968. The organisation's committee now meets bi-annually to review and update the constitution related the conduct of on-stage and marching contests, as well as the drill and marching regulations. Any changes decided at the meeting are subsequently circulated to all State Associations.

The state associations of New South Wales and Western Australia are not currently affiliated with the NBCA, meaning that as of 2025, only the states of Victoria, Queensland, Tasmania and South Australia are members.

== Affiliated Members ==
Four states of Australia are currently represented on the NBCA by their respective affiliated state governing bodies:

List of Affiliated State Band Associations (2025)
Queensland Band Association
South Australian Band Association
Tasmanian Bands League
Victorian Bands League

Formerly Affiliated State Band Associations
Band Association of New South Wales
Western Australian Band Association

== Competitive Banding ==
The National Band Council of Australia oversees the Australian National Band Championships, which annually take places over the Easter weekend. The championships comprise the following events:

- Brass and Concert Band (On-Stage) Championships
- Marching Championships
- Solo and Ensemble Championships

=== On-Stage Band Championships ===
The on-stage band championships are split into two categories: brass band championships and concert band championships. Each category of band is divided into grades based on ability level: open grades (A, B, C, D), and junior grades (A, B, C). The open grade sections refer to bands with no age limitations, whereas the junior grade sections require that all players 19 years or younger.

The modern on-stage band championships follows the format of a four piece repertoire, which consists of two major works and two minor works:

- Hymn or Sacred Item selection (a reflective piece connected with religion or of a spiritual nature)
- Test piece (a major work selected by the Music Advisory Board, which is at the standard of the grade level)
- Own choice (a major work selected by the band's director, highlighting the band's strengths)
- Stage March (a march, which must be selected from the NBCA approved prescribed march list)

It has become common practice that the concert band championships are held on one day, and all four pieces are performed by each band in the one sitting. However, the brass band championships have maintained their traditional split-day format of Day 1 (Good Friday) Hymn and Test, Day 2 (Easter Saturday) Parade of Bands, and Day 3 (Easter Sunday) own Choice and On-Stage march.

The test piece is a major work, which is pre-selected by a Music Advisory Board. It serves as a measure of the standard level of ability for each respective competitive grade. It has become a custom for these test selections (along with solo test pieces) to be published by the organisers on 1 September. On-stage marches must be selected from the approved prescribed list. Although the freedom of choice is limited, the list is regularly updated and the NBCA is always open to appropriate suggestions.

Bands are allocated points by the adjudicator(s), along with recorded comments as feedback for each individual band. The maximum number of aggregate points an individual band can be awarded at any championships is 500 points - these points are divided into four allocations: Hymn selection - 50 points, Test selection - 200 points, Own choice selection - 200 points, On Stage March - 50 points. A perfect score in any of these selections is incredibly rare, with Hobart City Concert Band the last to do so - scoring the maximum 50 points for their hymn in the B Grade Concert Band Championships at the 2004 Championships (held in Launceston),

The winner of the championship is determined by the band with the highest aggregate score. In the event of a tie, the winner is determined by higher test piece score. In order to qualify for the on-stage championships, each band must perform all four pieces.

In the case of brass bands, there was previously an additional requirement of participation in the street marching championships in order to qualify for the on-stage championships. However, in recent years participation in the street marching has become optional. Marching was always optional for concert bands.

=== Marching Championships ===
Historically, the parade of bands marching display was mandatory for brass bands, but optional for concert bands. Brass bands must march in order to be eligible to win the on-stage championships. Bands participating in the marching contest are adjudicated on: drill, musicality, and inspection.

In June 2023, the NBCA Executive committee moved that the Marching Championships are no longer mandatory for any band, however the hosting state is still required to offer the event. Should insufficient interest be shown in the event, the Hosting State committee may approach the NBCA Executive committee to cancel the event. This applies from the 2024 Yamaha National Band Championships onwards.

=== Solo and Ensemble Championships ===
The solo championships are conducted in three main categories:

- Brass Band solo championships
- Concert Band solo championships
- Percussion solo championships

Like the band championships, each of these categories split into junior championships (Under 19 years) and open championships. With the brass band and concert band solos, each instrument of the band is allocated a section as well as a set test piece. Competitors can participate only participate in one solo section per band category, and compete against fellow musicians on the same instrument. At the end of the day, the winners of each instrumental section are invited to participate in the "Champion of Champions event" where a junior and an open Champion of Champion is awarded in all three categories.

The percussion solo championships operate slightly differently, in that percussionists can nominate to participate in any or all sections (i.e.: timpani, mallet percussion, auxiliary percussion). While there are section championships awarded, the percussion champion of champions is determined by aggregate points.

The ensemble championships also consists of open and junior championships, but is only open to quartets and quintets. There are no restrictions, as long as they play brass band and/or concert band instruments. There are no prescribed test pieces, and ensembles perform only one piece. Time restrictions apply for ensemble championships.
