= Tisbury, New Zealand =

Tisbury
- Suburb
- Interactive map of Tisbury
- Coordinates: 46.4445°S 168.3994°E
- Country: New Zealand
- City: Invercargill
- Local authority: Invercargill City Council

Area
  - Land: 821 ha (2,030 acres)

Population (2018 Census)
  - Total: 366
  - Density: 44.6/km^{2} (115/sq mi)

Strathern	Rockdale	Kennington
Kingswell	Tisbury	Waimatua
Clifton	Woodend	Motu Rimu

Tisbury is a semi-rural suburb of Invercargill in the south-eastern corner of the city, covering approximately 8.21 km². Its origins lie in agricultural land-use on the fringe of Invercargill, and over time it has evolved into a mix of lifestyle-blocks, small farms and residential lots.

From the mid-20th century onwards Tisbury began to reflect the wider Southland pattern of agricultural processing and secondary industry, beyond just pastoral farms.

One of the earliest enduring community institutions is Tisbury School. Opened on 27 January 1891, a second building was erected in early 1892 and after the original structure was destroyed by fire in 1945 the current classroom block was built. The school remains a focal point of the local community.

Another landmark is Tisbury Hall, which celebrated its 110th anniversary in August 2024. The event highlighted the hall’s long-standing role as a social and community gathering place, reinforcing Tisbury’s strong local identity.

Land use in Tisbury has also shifted significantly. The local reserve known as Tisbury Reserve occupies land originally used as gravel pits. Sections 68-72, Block II, Town of Seaward Bush, were vested for gravel-pit use in 1924, leased for many years, then transferred to Invercargill City in 1957. In October 1968 the land was gazetted as a recreation reserve and by 1984 the gravel-pit classification was revoked. This transition from extractive (gravel) use to open recreation reflects how the area’s economic base diversified and the suburban fringe gradually matured.

Demographically, the 2018 New Zealand census recorded a population of 366 for Tisbury. The suburb remains sparsely populated, reinforcing its semi-rural character even as it lies within city boundaries.

In the 21st century, Tisbury has also become the site of new development in the cultural and heritage space. A purpose-built storage facility for the region’s museum collections — part of the broader Project 1225 — was constructed in Tisbury, completing in late 2023, to house millions of artifacts previously held by the region’s museum. This facility underscores how Tisbury is not simply a rural fringe but also part of the region’s strategic infrastructure

The unsteady climate often affect crops in Tisbury. In 2015 the cold weather continued till Christmas and vegetable farmers were unable to yield crops in time.

== Demographics ==
Historical population for Tisbury
Year	Pop.	±% p.a.
2006	357	—
2013	402	+1.71%
2018	366	−1.86%

Tisbury covers 8.21 km^{2} (3.17 sq mi) and is part of the Kennington-Tisbury statistical area.

It had a population of 366 at the 2018 New Zealand census, a decrease of 36 people (−9.0%) since the 2013 census, and an increase of 9 people (2.5%) since the 2006 census. There were 141 households, comprising 201 males and 162 females, giving a sex ratio of 1.24 males per female, with 66 people (18.0%) aged under 15 years, 48 (13.1%) aged 15 to 29, 201 (54.9%) aged 30 to 64, and 51 (13.9%) aged 65 or older.

Ethnicities were 91.0% European/Pākehā, 13.1% Māori, 0.8% Pasifika, and 4.1% Asian. People may identify with more than one ethnicity.

Although some people chose not to answer the census's question about religious affiliation, 51.6% had no religion, 37.7% were Christian, 0.8% were Buddhist and 0.8% had other religions.

Of those at least 15 years old, 39 (13.0%) people had a bachelor's or higher degree, and 75 (25.0%) people had no formal qualifications. 39 people (13.0%) earned over $70,000 compared to 17.2% nationally. The employment status of those at least 15 was that 159 (53.0%) people were employed full-time, 51 (17.0%) were part-time, and 6 (2.0%) were unemployed.

=== Kennington-Tisbury statistical area ===
Kennington-Tisbury covers 36.25 km^{2} (14.00 sq mi) and had an estimated population of 1,470 as of June 2025, with a population density of 41 people per km^{2}.

Historical population for Kennington-Tisbury
Year	Pop.	±% p.a.
2006	1,092	—
2013	1,317	+2.71%
2018	1,443	+1.84%

Before the 2023 census, the statistical area had a larger boundary, covering 37.11 km^{2} (14.33 sq mi). Using that boundary, Kennington-Tisbury had a population of 1,443 at the 2018 New Zealand census, an increase of 126 people (9.6%) since the 2013 census, and an increase of 351 people (32.1%) since the 2006 census. There were 528 households, comprising 756 males and 687 females, giving a sex ratio of 1.1 males per female. The median age was 43.5 years (compared with 37.4 years nationally), with 306 people (21.2%) aged under 15 years, 189 (13.1%) aged 15 to 29, 723 (50.1%) aged 30 to 64, and 228 (15.8%) aged 65 or older.

Ethnicities were 92.7% European/Pākehā, 12.3% Māori, 0.8% Pasifika, 2.3% Asian, and 1.5% other ethnicities. People may identify with more than one ethnicity.

The percentage of people born overseas was 8.3, compared with 27.1% nationally.

Although some people chose not to answer the census's question about religious affiliation, 50.5% had no religion, 42.4% were Christian, 0.2% had Māori religious beliefs, 0.4% were Buddhist and 0.4% had other religions.

Of those at least 15 years old, 174 (15.3%) people had a bachelor's or higher degree, and 252 (22.2%) people had no formal qualifications. The median income was $39,700, compared with $31,800 nationally. 234 people (20.6%) earned over $70,000 compared to 17.2% nationally. The employment status of those at least 15 was that 627 (55.1%) people were employed full-time, 207 (18.2%) were part-time, and 24 (2.1%) were unemployed.

== Education ==
Tisbury School is a state school for years 1 to 6 with a roll of 104 students as of March 2026. The school was established in 1891, but it was destroyed by a fire in 1945 and the present classroom block was built to replace it.
