= Grove Bush =

Human settlement in Southland District, Southland Region, New Zealand

- Village
- Interactive map of Grove Bush
- Coordinates: 46.293°S 168.479°E
- Country: New Zealand
- Region: Southland region
- Territorial authorities of New Zealand: Southland District
- Ward: Waihopai Toetoe Ward
- Community: Waihopai Toetoe Community
- Electorates: Invercargill; Te Tai Tonga (Māori)

Government
  - Territorial authority: Southland District Council
  - Regional council: Southland Regional Council
  - Mayor of Southland: Rob Scott
  - Invercargill MP: Penny Simmonds
  - Te Tai Tonga MP: Tākuta Ferris
- Time zone: UTC+12 (New Zealand Standard Time)
  - Summer (DST): UTC+13 (New Zealand Daylight Time)
- Postcode: 9876
- Local iwi: Ngāi Tahu

Grove Bush is a village in the Southland region of New Zealand's South Island. It is located on the banks of the Makarewa River on the Southland Plains near the foothills of the Hokonui Hills.

The village's main feature is its community hall. It is situated in a rural area of fertile farmland; the nearest city, Invercargill, is approximately 20 km southwest. Other small townships are nearby: Mabel Bush is just to the east, while Springhills and Hedgehope are to the north and Rakahouka is to the south.

== Demographics ==
Grove Bush statistical area covers 145.56 km^{2} (56.20 sq mi) and had an estimated population of 1,370 as of June 2025, with a population density of 9.4 people per km^{2}.

Historical population
Year	Pop.	±% p.a.
2006	975	—
2013	1,065	+1.27%
2018	1,158	+1.69%

Grove Bush had a population of 1,158 at the 2018 New Zealand census, an increase of 93 people (8.7%) since the 2013 census, and an increase of 183 people (18.8%) since the 2006 census. There were 402 households, comprising 582 males and 576 females, giving a sex ratio of 1.01 males per female. The median age was 38.9 years (compared with 37.4 years nationally), with 267 people (23.1%) aged under 15 years, 183 (15.8%) aged 15 to 29, 567 (49.0%) aged 30 to 64, and 135 (11.7%) aged 65 or older.

Ethnicities were 90.9% European/Pākehā, 6.0% Māori, 0.5% Pasifika, 4.7% Asian, and 2.1% other ethnicities. People may identify with more than one ethnicity.

The percentage of people born overseas was 9.3, compared with 27.1% nationally.

Although some people chose not to answer the census's question about religious affiliation, 50.3% had no religion, 39.4% were Christian, 0.3% had Māori religious beliefs, 0.3% were Hindu, 0.3% were Buddhist and 1.0% had other religions.

Of those at least 15 years old, 144 (16.2%) people had a bachelor's or higher degree, and 198 (22.2%) people had no formal qualifications. The median income was $41,500, compared with $31,800 nationally. 198 people (22.2%) earned over $70,000 compared to 17.2% nationally. The employment status of those at least 15 was that 534 (59.9%) people were employed full-time, 156 (17.5%) were part-time, and 15 (1.7%) were unemployed.
