= Roslyn Bush =

Locality in Southland, New Zealand

Coordinates: 46°21′S 168°27′E

Roslyn Bush is a lightly populated locality on the northeastern outskirts of the city of Invercargill in the Southland region of New Zealand's South Island. Other nearby settlements include Makarewa to the west, Myross Bush to the southwest, Kennington to the south, Longbush and Woodlands to the east, and Rakahouka to the northeast.

Roslyn Bush is located near State Highway 98, which runs between Makarewa and Dacre. It used to have a primary school, but it has closed and been converted into a play centre for younger children. The nearest primary school is in Myross Bush.
