= Otatara =

- Suburb
- Interactive map of Otatara
- Coordinates: 46.4318°S 168.2953°E
- Country: New Zealand
- Region: Southland region
- Territorial authority: Invercargill
- Electorates: Invercargill; Te Tai Tonga (Māori)

Government
  - Territorial authority: Southland District Council
  - Regional council: Southland Regional Council
  - Mayor of Southland: Rob Scott
  - Invercargill MP: Penny Simmonds
  - Te Tai Tonga MP: Tākuta Ferris

Area
  - Total: 19.95 km^{2} (7.70 sq mi)

Population (June 2025)
  - Total: 3,500
  - Density: 180/km^{2} (450/sq mi)
- Postal code: 9879 (RD 9)
- Local iwi: Ngāi Tahu

Otatara is an outer suburb of New Zealand's southernmost city, Invercargill. It is surrounded by the Ōreti River to the west and south, and its estuary and Invercargill Airport to the east, and West Plains to the north. Historically, it was in Southland County before it was abolished.

The main thoroughfare in Otatara is Dunns Road, which continues westward across the Ōreti River bridge to road's end at Oreti Beach, towards Invercargill it becomes Stead Street at the old city/county boundary, passing between the estuary and the airport before crossing the Waihopai River bridge into the city proper.

There are several local bush walks through tōtara forests, and numerous recreational facilities in the area including MTB tracks, rowing, speed boating, two golf courses and the nearby Oreti Beach.

The name derives from Ota-tara meaning Green Point or Bushy Point, an obvious name for the heavily forested peninsula which was a source of birds and other resources for the early Māori inhabitants, this name was assigned to this area during the surveying of the Invercargill district for settlement, although the New Zealand Ministry for Culture and Heritage gives a translation of "place of loosening" for Otatara.

There was a post office in a grocery store along Dunns Road, which lost its importance when a rural delivery from Invercargill commenced around 1960, and residents erected mailboxes on the roadside outside their houses. There is a Four Square store in Dunns Road now (2026).

== Demographics ==
Otatara covers 19.95 km^{2} (7.70 sq mi) and had an estimated population of 3,500 as of June 2025, with a population density of 175 people per km^{2}.

Historical population
Year	Pop.	±% p.a.
2006	2,742	—
2013	3,036	+1.47%
2018	3,144	+0.70%

Otatara had a population of 3,144 at the 2018 New Zealand census, an increase of 108 people (3.6%) since the 2013 census, and an increase of 402 people (14.7%) since the 2006 census. There were 1,119 households, comprising 1,620 males and 1,527 females, giving a sex ratio of 1.06 males per female. The median age was 42.7 years (compared with 37.4 years nationally), with 693 people (22.0%) aged under 15 years, 405 (12.9%) aged 15 to 29, 1,641 (52.2%) aged 30 to 64, and 408 (13.0%) aged 65 or older.

Ethnicities were 94.2% European/Pākehā, 12.5% Māori, 1.4% Pasifika, 1.7% Asian, and 2.1% other ethnicities. People may identify with more than one ethnicity.

The percentage of people born overseas was 12.2, compared with 27.1% nationally.

Although some people chose not to answer the census's question about religious affiliation, 55.1% had no religion, 36.7% were Christian, 0.3% had Māori religious beliefs, 0.2% were Hindu, 0.1% were Muslim, 0.3% were Buddhist and 1.0% had other religions.

Of those at least 15 years old, 606 (24.7%) people had a bachelor's or higher degree, and 414 (16.9%) people had no formal qualifications. The median income was $45,400, compared with $31,800 nationally. 696 people (28.4%) earned over $70,000 compared to 17.2% nationally. The employment status of those at least 15 was that 1,431 (58.4%) people were employed full-time, 423 (17.3%) were part-time, and 51 (2.1%) were unemployed.

== Education ==
Otatara School is a contributing primary school serving years 1 to 6 with a roll of 237 students as of July 2026. The school began as Otatara Bush School in 1879.
