= Birchwood, New Zealand =

Locality in New Zealand

Coordinates: 45°56′S 167°52′E

Birchwood is a locality in the Southland region of New Zealand's South Island. It is situated west of Ohai and Nightcaps, and north of Tuatapere and Orawia, with the nearest state highway in Ohai.

Birchwood was once the terminus of a private railway line run by the Ohai Railway Board, an extension of the Wairio Branch. The 19 km line from Wairio to Birchwood ran via Ohai and opened in 1934. The section from Ohai to Birchwood had been closed by the time the section from Wairio to Ohai was incorporated into the national network in 1990.
