= Kennington, New Zealand =

Kennington
- Rural settlement
- Interactive map of Kennington
- Coordinates: 46°24′S 168°27′E
- Country: New Zealand
- Region: Southland region
- Territorial authority: Invercargill
- Electorates: Invercargill; Te Tai Tonga (Māori)

Government
  - Territorial authority: Southland District Council
  - Regional council: Southland Regional Council
  - Mayor of Southland: Rob Scott
  - Invercargill MP: Penny Simmonds
  - Te Tai Tonga MP: Tākuta Ferris

Area
  - Total: 1.16 km^{2} (0.45 sq mi)

Population (2018 Census)
  - Total: 114
  - Density: 98.3/km^{2} (255/sq mi)
- Local iwi: Ngāi Tahu

Kennington is a town located in the Southland region of New Zealand’s South Island. It is situated on the Waihopai River on the eastern outskirts of the city of Invercargill. Other nearby settlements include Longbush, Myross Bush, Motu Rimu, and Woodlands.

State Highway 1 runs through the town, as does the Main South Line portion of the South Island Main Trunk Railway. Passenger trains have not operated since the cancellation of the Southerner on 10 February 2002, though it was an express service and local passenger trains that stopped in Kennington had ceased to operate decades earlier.

In the early 2000s (decade), a proposal to build a large incinerator in Kennington generated controversy and was ultimately abandoned. Some residents feared pollution from the incinerator would cause degradation in the quality of the town's air and bore and rain water.

== Demographics ==
Kennington is described as a rural settlement by Statistics New Zealand, and covers 1.16 km^{2} (0.45 sq mi). It is part of the Kennington-Tisbury statistical area.

Historical population
Year	Pop.	±% p.a.
2006	114	—
2013	123	+1.09%
2018	114	−1.51%

Kennington had a population of 114 at the 2018 New Zealand census, a decrease of 9 people (−7.3%) since the 2013 census, and unchanged since the 2006 census. There were 45 households, comprising 60 males and 54 females, giving a sex ratio of 1.11 males per female. The median age was 33.1 years (compared with 37.4 years nationally), with 27 people (23.7%) aged under 15 years, 24 (21.1%) aged 15 to 29, 54 (47.4%) aged 30 to 64, and 9 (7.9%) aged 65 or older.

Ethnicities were 94.7% European/Pākehā, 23.7% Māori, 2.6% Pasifika, 0.0% Asian, and 2.6% other ethnicities. People may identify with more than one ethnicity.

Although some people chose not to answer the census's question about religious affiliation, 60.5% had no religion, and 28.9% were Christian.

Of those at least 15 years old, 6 (6.9%) people had a bachelor's or higher degree, and 18 (20.7%) people had no formal qualifications. The median income was $40,500, compared with $31,800 nationally. 12 people (13.8%) earned over $70,000 compared to 17.2% nationally. The employment status of those at least 15 was that 51 (58.6%) people were employed full-time, 15 (17.2%) were part-time, and 6 (6.9%) were unemployed.

== Education ==
Rimu School is a state contributing primary school for years 1 to 8 with a roll of 101 as of July 2026. It was established by 1893.
