= Glencoe, New Zealand =

Coordinates: 46°11′S 168°41′E

Glencoe is a locality in the central Southland region of New Zealand's South Island. Named after Glen Coe (or in Scottish Gaelic: Gleann Comhan) in Scotland, it is situated in the Hokonui Hills on the route of State Highway 96 as it travels between Hedgehope and Waitane. The nearest town of significant size is Mataura to the east, while the city of Invercargill is to the southwest.

In February 1999, a cairn was dedicated in Glencoe to commemorate the 1692 Massacre of Glencoe.

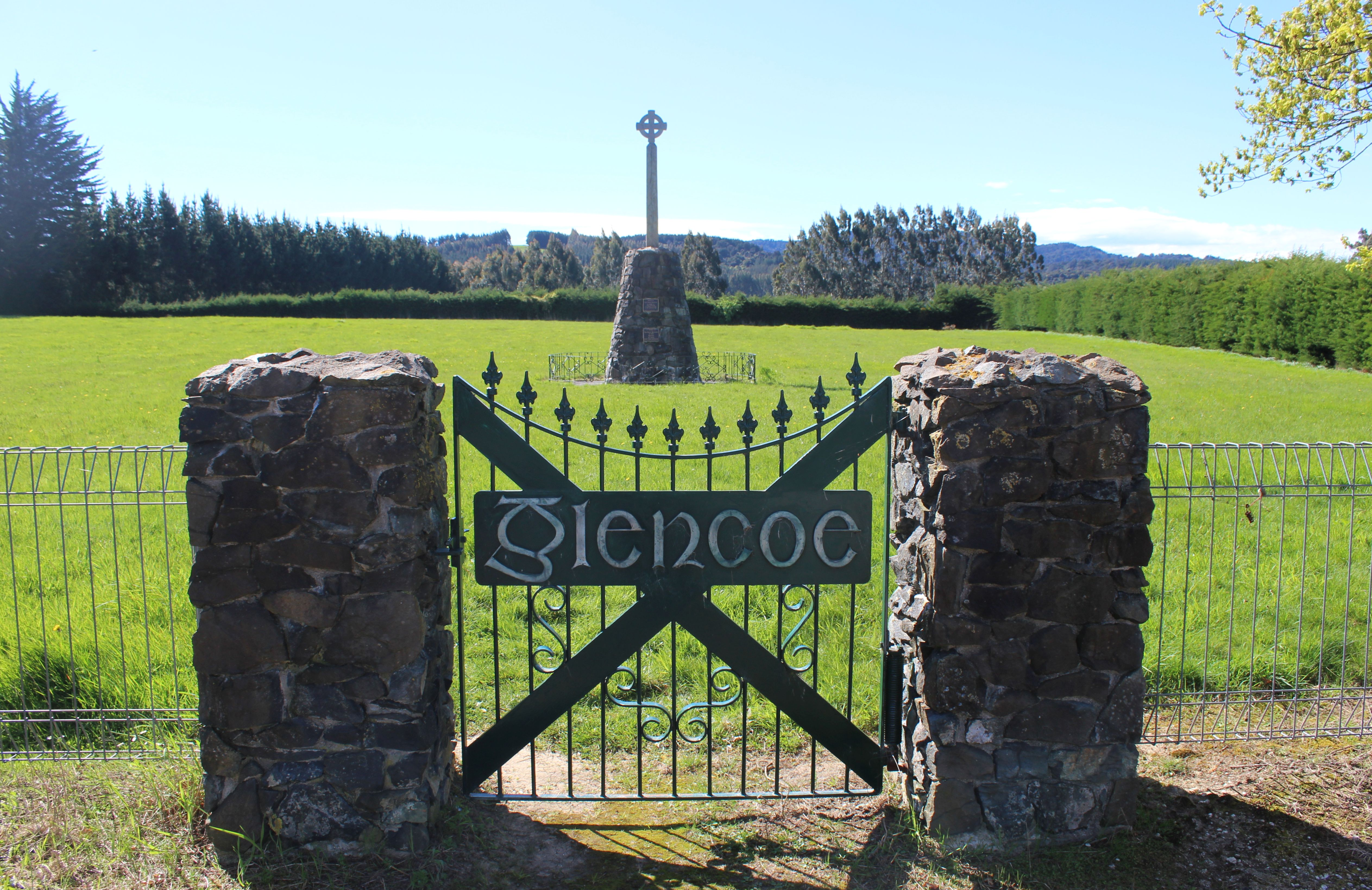

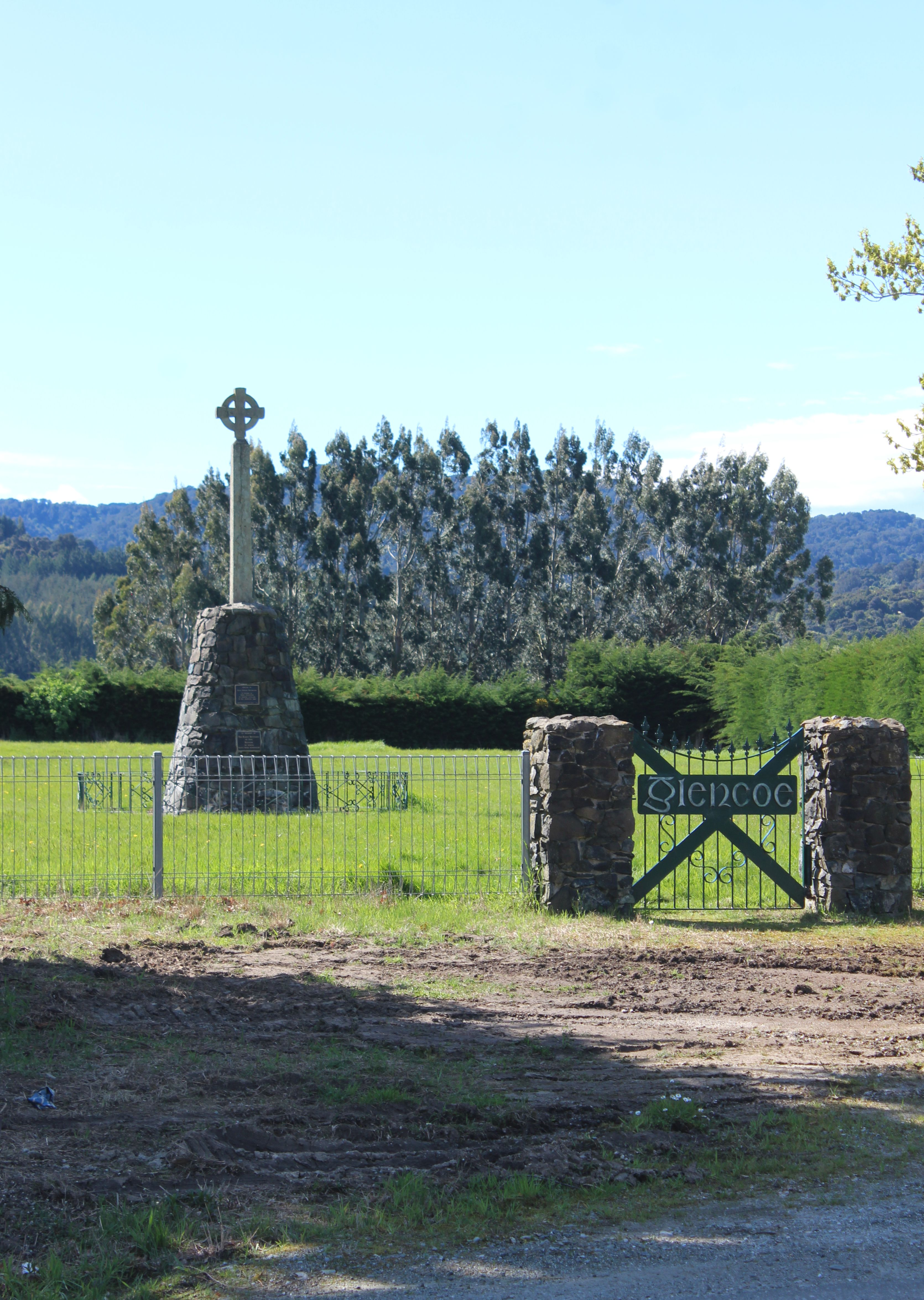

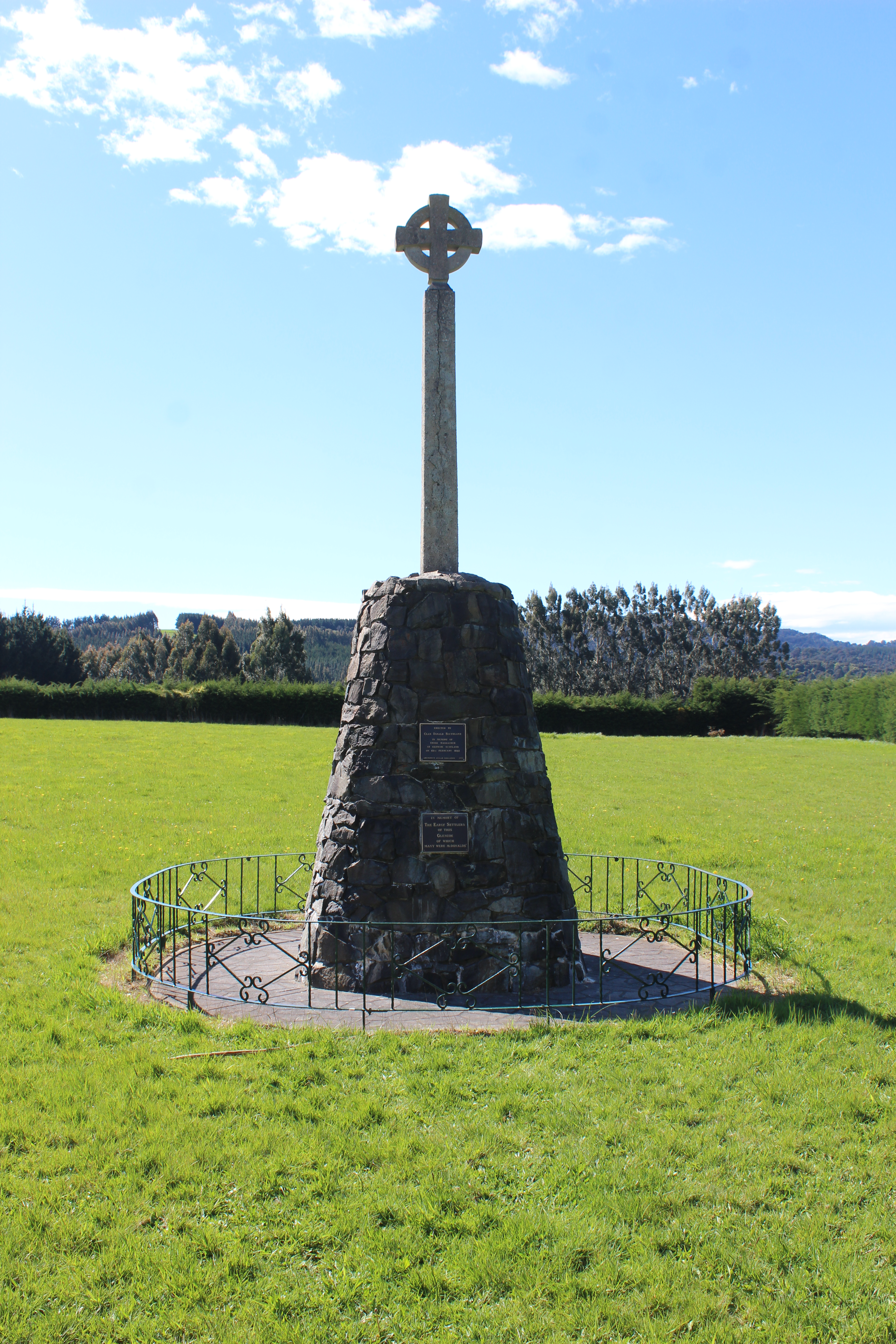

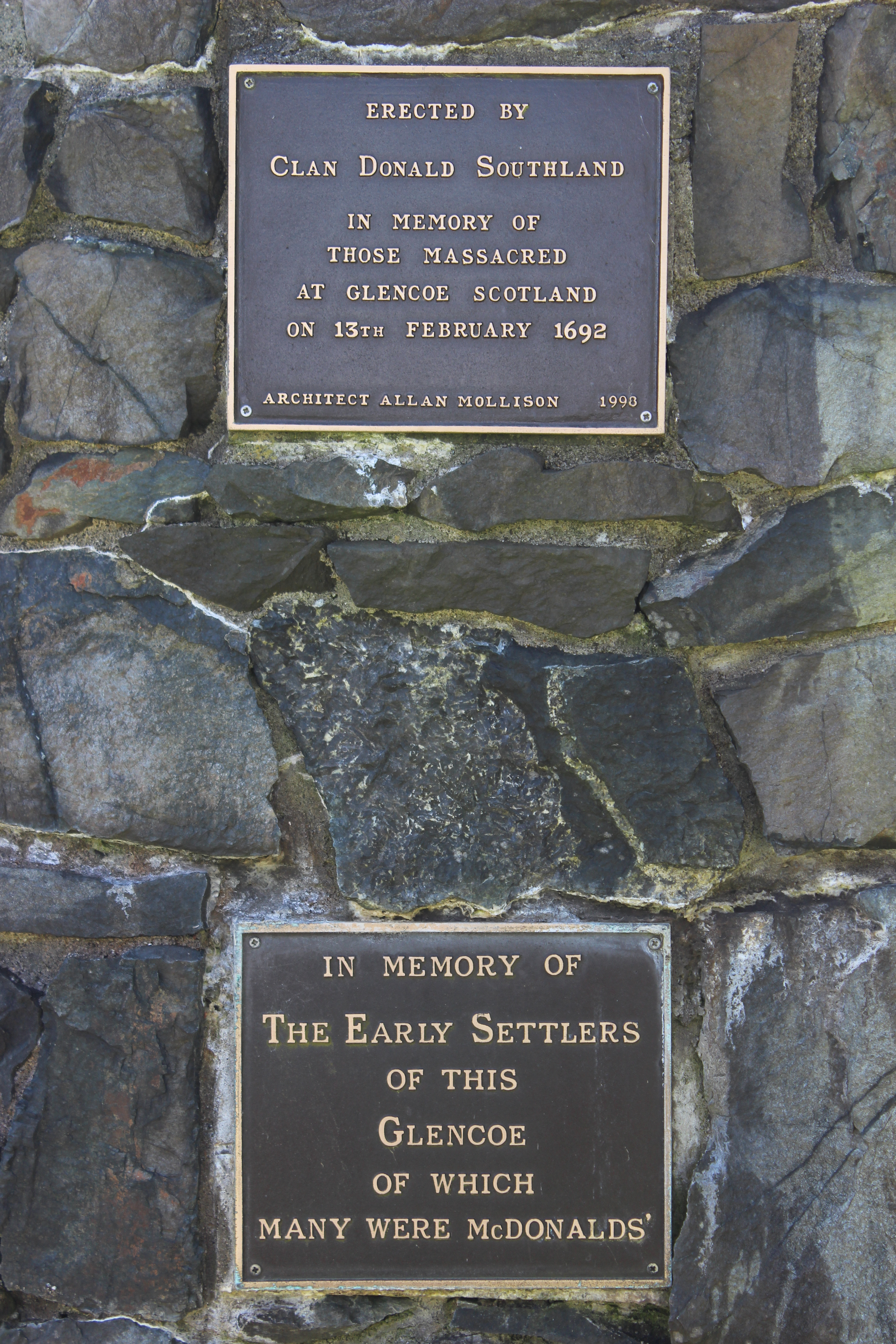

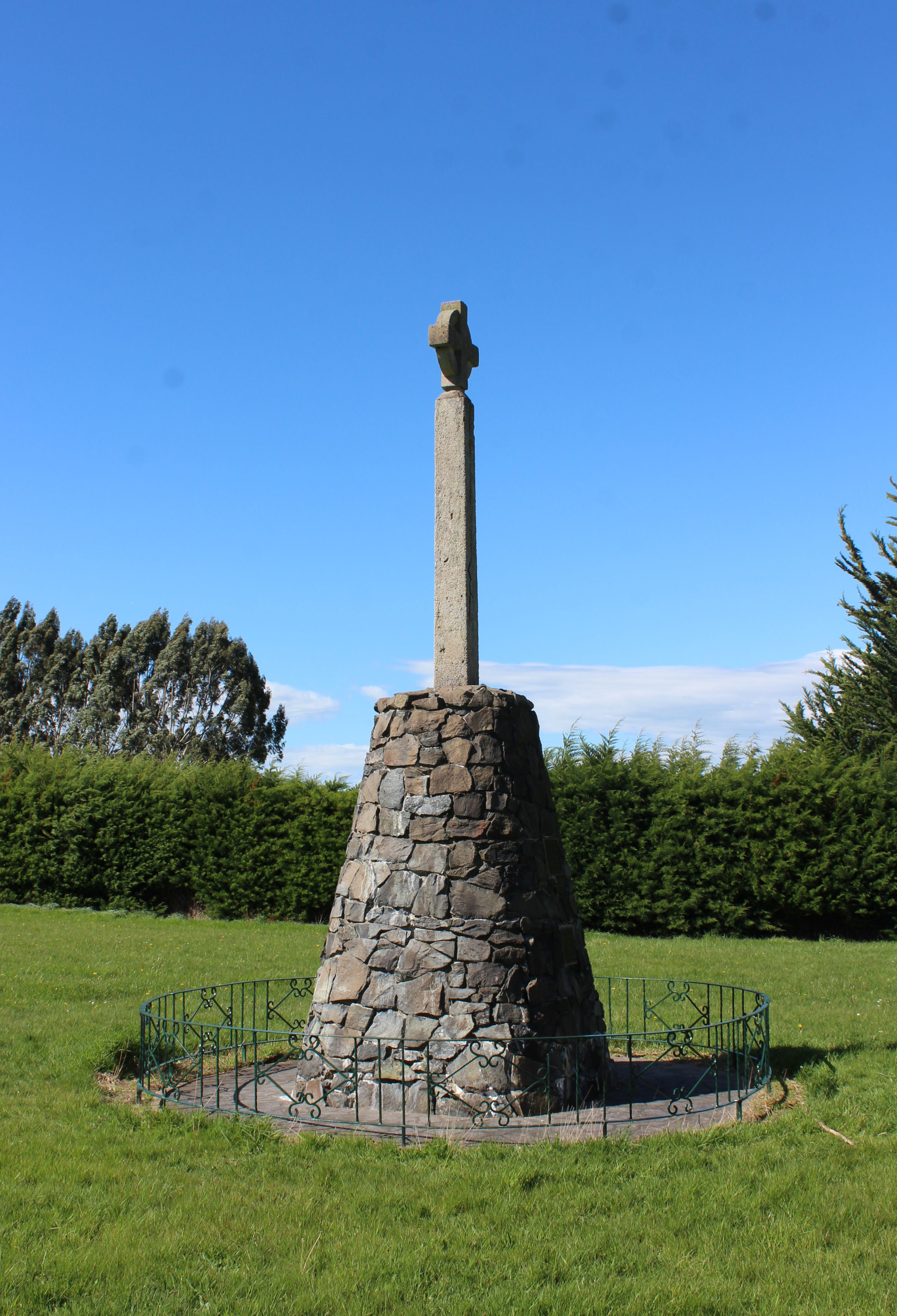
