= Hedgehope =

Hedgehope may refer to:

- Hedgehope, New Zealand: a village in Southland, New Zealand
- Hedgehope Branch: a closed railway line to Hedgehope, New Zealand
- Hedgehope Hill: a mountain in England near the Scottish border
