= Springhills =

Coordinates: 46°11′S 168°29′E

Springhills is a locality in the central Southland region of New Zealand's South Island. Situated in a gap between Forest Hill and the Hokonui Hills, it is located on State Highway 96 29 kilometres west of State Highway 1 near Mataura and 15 kilometres east of State Highway 6 at Winton.

From 1899 until 1953, Springhills was also served by a branch line railway. The railway grew from a private bush tramway built in 1883 that ran from a junction with the Kingston Branch in Winton into the Browns Gap area. In the 1890s, the tramway was upgraded to railway standards, extended to Hedgehope, and handed over to the New Zealand Railways Department. This line was known as the Hedgehope Branch and it opened on 17 July 1899 with a station near Springhills known as Springhills Siding. Passenger services ceased on 9 February 1931, and due to declining freight tonnages, the Browns-Hedgehope section that passed through Springhills was closed on 24 December 1953. Little evidence remains of Springhills' railway heritage, though the former line's formation can sometimes be discerned.
