= Browns, New Zealand =

Locality in Southland District, Southland Region, New Zealand

Coordinates: 46°09′S 168°25′E

Browns is a locality in Central Southland in New Zealand's South Island. It is just to the east of the town of Winton in the southwestern reaches of the Hokonui Hills. State Highway 96 passes through the town on its route between Winton and Springhills.

Browns was also the terminus of a railway branch line from 1953 until 1968. In 1883, a bush tramway was built into the Browns area from a junction with the Kingston Branch in Winton. In the 1890s, it was upgraded to railway standards, extended to Hedgehope, and handed over to the New Zealand Railways Department. This line was known as the Hedgehope Branch and opened on 17 July 1899 with a station in Browns. Passenger services ceased on 9 February 1931, and due to the decline in freight from stations beyond Browns, the Browns-Hedgehope section closed on 24 December 1953. Agricultural lime was the predominant traffic from Browns, and when government subsidies for the transport of lime by rail were slashed and the railway link (the Tokanui Branch) to the primary destination for Browns lime was closed, freight tonnages fell below sustainable levels. Accordingly, the branch from Winton to Browns was closed on 1 January 1968. Very little of Browns' railway heritage is now evident in the village.

== Education ==
Hillside School is a state contributing primary school for years 1 to 8 with a roll of 26 as of November 2024.
