= Ohai =

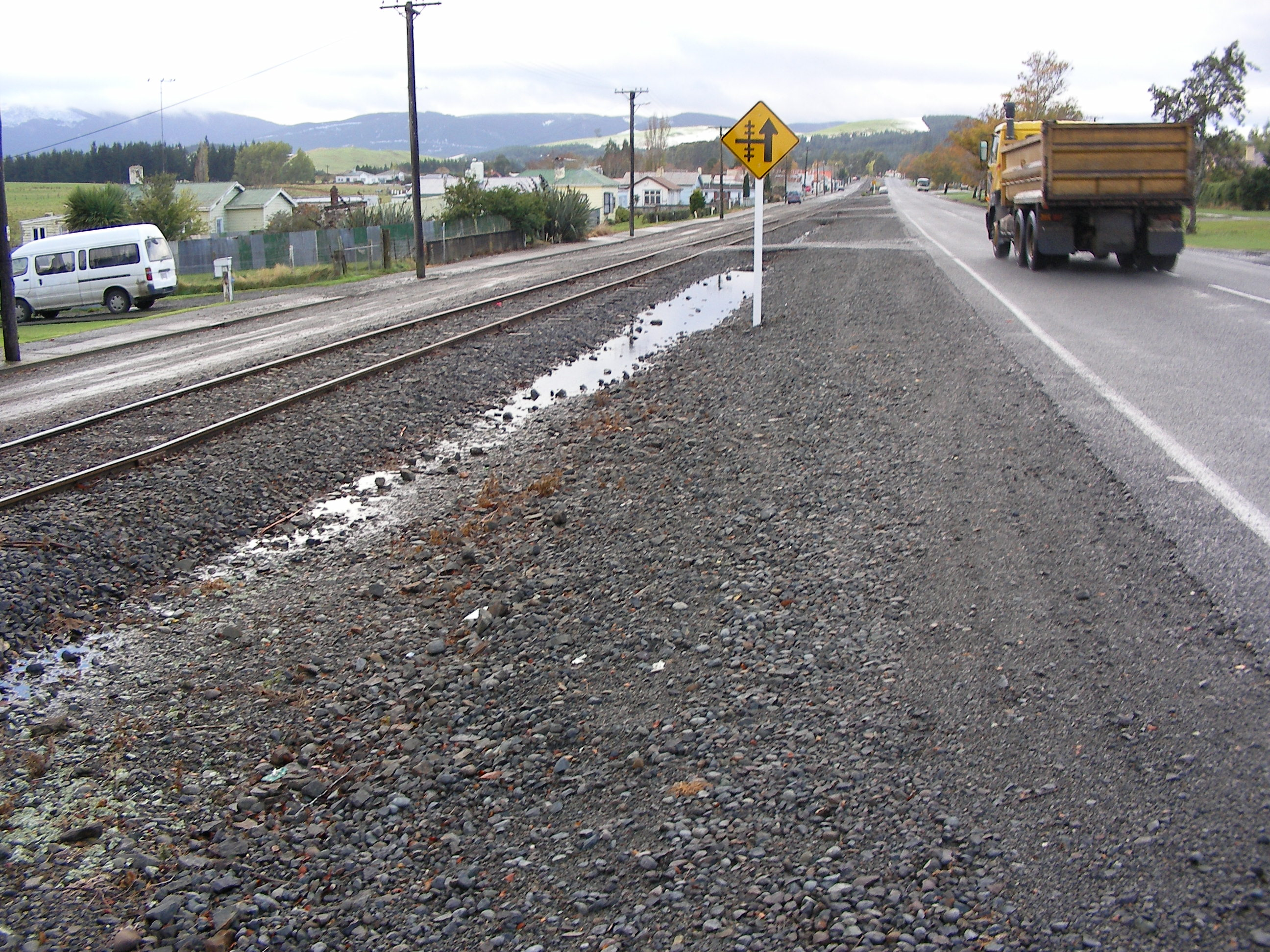
- The main street in Ohai running parallel with the Ohai Line
- Interactive map of Ohai
- Coordinates: 45°55′59″S 167°57′21″E
- Country: New Zealand
- Island: South Island
- Region: Southland region
- Territorial authorities of New Zealand: Southland District
- Ward: Waiau Aparima Ward
- Community: Wallace Takitimu Community
- Electorates: Invercargill; Te Tai Tonga (Māori)

Government
  - Territorial authority: Southland District Council
  - Regional council: Southland Regional Council
  - Mayor of Southland: Rob Scott
  - Invercargill MP: Penny Simmonds
  - Te Tai Tonga MP: Tākuta Ferris

Area
  - Total: 1.10 km^{2} (0.42 sq mi)

Population (June 2025)
  - Total: 290
  - Density: 260/km^{2} (680/sq mi)

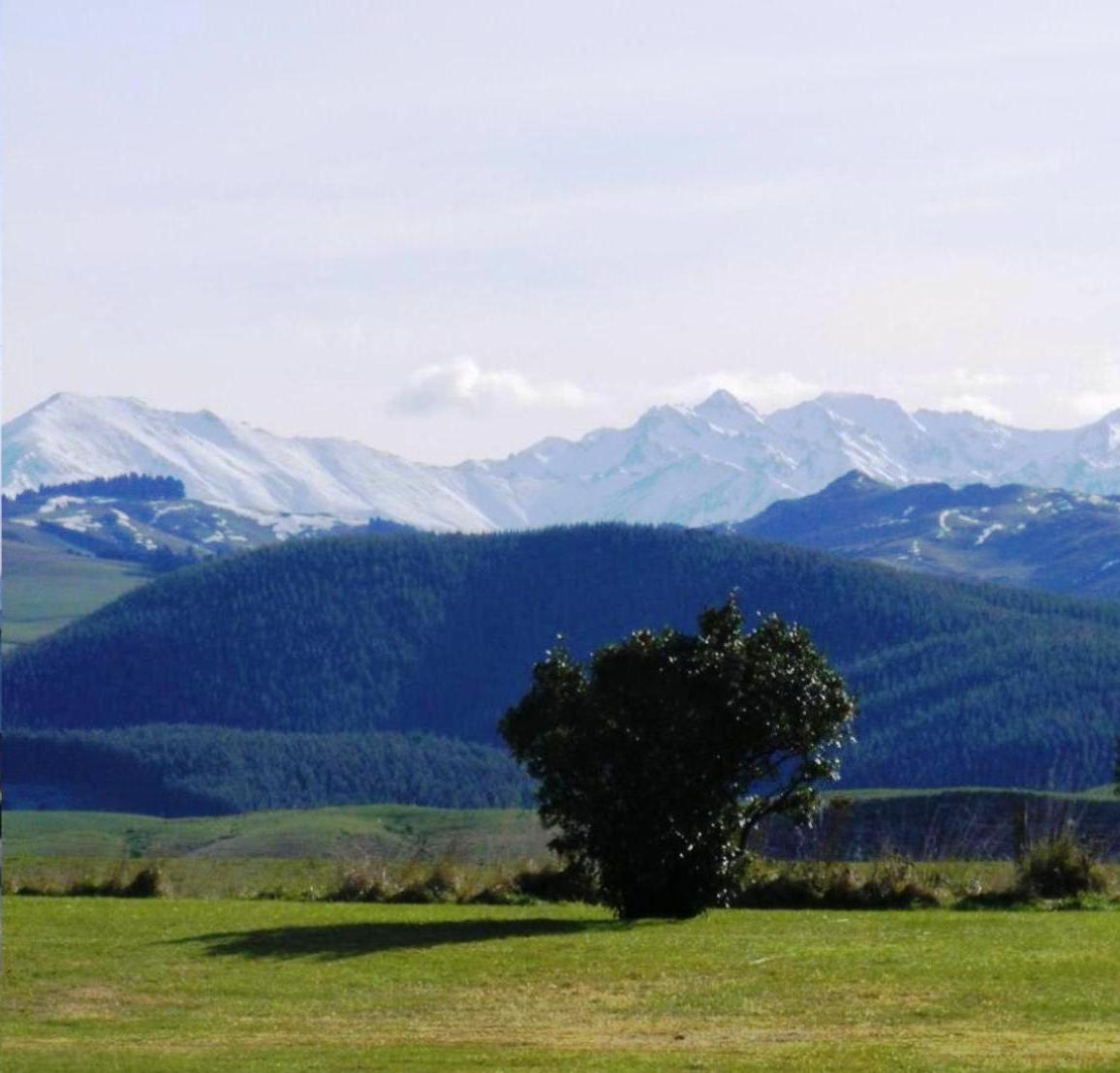
View of the Takitimu Mountains from the main road of the town of Ohai

Ohai is a town in the Southland region of New Zealand's South Island, 65 kilometres (40 mi) northwest of Invercargill and 25 kilometres (16 mi) west of Winton.

== History ==
=== Origins of name ===
The literal meaning of Ohai is unclear, but a mural in the town centre reads "OHAI" and then curved underneath "Place of the Stone". The name Ohai was recorded by James Herries Beattie as in use for the area before 1840. Up until as late as 1958 Morley stream near the town was officially called Ohai Stream in the Wairio District Survey maps. It is likely that the area was originally named in relation to an historic Maori stone quarry that is nearby as described in New Zealand Archaeological Association Schedule & Maps of Recorded Archaeological Sites, Map 7, Page 271

=== Early history ===
Ohai township was founded in 1917 following the discovery of large amounts of high quality coal in the area. However, the early days of mining were restricted by poor roads. Coal production boomed in the area in 1925, when the Ohai Railway Board opened a new line linking Wairio to the Ohai Railway District. This line also carried workers between Wairio and Ohai on a passenger steam train called the ‘Piecart’.

In order to provide convenient transport of the coal to markets beyond the local area, a privately owned railway extension from the New Zealand Railways Department's Wairio Branch was opened by the Ohai Railway Board in January 1925. In 1934, this line was further extended beyond Ohai to Birchwood, but the terminus had reverted to Ohai by the time the line was incorporated into the national rail network in 1990. The line is now called the Ohai Line and is one of the very few survivors of a formerly extensive rural branch line network. The Ohai Railway Board Heritage Trust, which had no connection with the Ohai Railway Board, was involved in the restoration of steam locomotives including members of the P and V classes and a railway museum was established, but the trust has been dissolved.

=== Modern history ===
Mechanization of mining methods in the 1980s brought huge changes to Ohai (and the nearby sister town of Nightcaps). Many families with generations associated in mining left the area. In Ohai today, shearing now rivals mining as the biggest industry employer in the town. Recent times have seen a number of people move into the Ohai/Nightcaps area (many of them North Islanders), attracted by the rural lifestyle and affordable housing. Ohai's rural location lends itself well to many outdoor pursuits. These include fishing and duck hunting, the close proximity of rivers and duck ponds making these popular local pursuits.

The Ohai coal mine closed in September 2021

== Demographics ==
Ohai is described by Statistics New Zealand as a rural settlement, and covers 1.10 km^{2} (0.42 sq mi). It had an estimated population of 290 as of June 2025, with a population density of 264 people per km^{2}. It is part of the much larger Ohai-Nightcaps statistical area.

Historical population
Year	Pop.	±% p.a.
2006	357	—
2013	306	−2.18%
2018	267	−2.69%

Ohai had a population of 267 at the 2018 New Zealand census, a decrease of 39 people (−12.7%) since the 2013 census, and a decrease of 90 people (−25.2%) since the 2006 census. There were 117 households, comprising 144 males and 123 females, giving a sex ratio of 1.17 males per female, with 39 people (14.6%) aged under 15 years, 39 (14.6%) aged 15 to 29, 135 (50.6%) aged 30 to 64, and 51 (19.1%) aged 65 or older.

Ethnicities were 74.2% European/Pākehā, 41.6% Māori, and 1.1% other ethnicities. People may identify with more than one ethnicity.

Although some people chose not to answer the census's question about religious affiliation, 42.7% had no religion, 34.8% were Christian, 3.4% had Māori religious beliefs, 1.1% were Hindu and 4.5% had other religions.

Of those at least 15 years old, 6 (2.6%) people had a bachelor's or higher degree, and 93 (40.8%) people had no formal qualifications. 9 people (3.9%) earned over $70,000 compared to 17.2% nationally. The employment status of those at least 15 was that 78 (34.2%) people were employed full-time, 33 (14.5%) were part-time, and 15 (6.6%) were unemployed.

== Infrastructure ==
Ohai is the terminus of State Highway 96, which runs from Mataura via Hedgehope and Winton. The primary school closed in 2003 and students now attend school in nearby Nightcaps. A heated and covered swimming pool, tennis courts, golf course, a bowls club, a police station, and a recreational reserve are located in the town.

The Takitimu District Pool is a large (33 metre) heated, covered pool in Ohai. It is open for use during daylight hours from around late October through to March. Sliding doors allow the pool area to be opened out to an outdoor garden. Public sessions are available at certain times most afternoons during the season. Once a week during these sessions the 'inflatable' is used in the pool. Alternatively, family or single keys can be purchased seasonally, providing users with unlimited use during daylight hours. Local coal, supplied by Solid Energy, heats the swimming pool. Many volunteers donate their time to help maintain and manage this facility.

Despite concerns about the closure of the mine, many residents look forward to the establishment of recreational lakes that will be connected to the local trout stream, and the construction of walkways around the Morley streams and proposed lakes. An example of the coal mine rehabilitation with the similar community use concept can be found at Glyncorrwg, South Wales, United Kingdom.

== Threat of mine subsidence ==
Map showing extent of underground mining in Ohai area.

During 2012 there was some concern from some residents of a possible mine subsidence risk in Ohai, due to several old mining tunnels under the Northern part of the township dating from pre-World War II, the old Wairaki 3 mine works.

In July, a man had called the council claiming his drainage system was affected by subsidence, but an engineer had concluded it was not the case. Solid Energy had told the council the risk of subsidence from the old Wairaki 3 mine works, which lie under the northern side of the township, was "very minimal", he said, since subsidence normally occurred in the first few years, but they would continue working together to examine it.

After an unrelated survey of 2 km of pipes was completed, Council Chief executive Dave Adamson said overall, the survey work did not highlight any areas that may cause significant immediate concern. "Now that we have some good information on the condition of the pipes it will allow us to plan better for the long term. It needs to be made clear the purpose of the survey was to determine the condition and remaining life of the pipes, it was not to prove or disprove the existence of a subsidence issue or problem." "However, any subsidence would have been obvious during the camera survey", Mr Adamson said.

Ohai CDA chairman John Hogg said he had not heard of houses or gardens subsiding in the township. Council chief executive Dave Adamson said he had asked staff to look at the problem, but many old mining towns in New Zealand had tunnels underneath them. "As far as I know we haven't had any direct reports of subsidence issues to date," he said. However, going public with the potential subsidence issue was not welcomed by some in Ohai. One of the CDA members who resigned, said he was unhappy another CDA member had gone to the Southland Times,(Regional Newspaper).
