= State Highway 96 (New Zealand) =

Road in New Zealand

State Highway 96

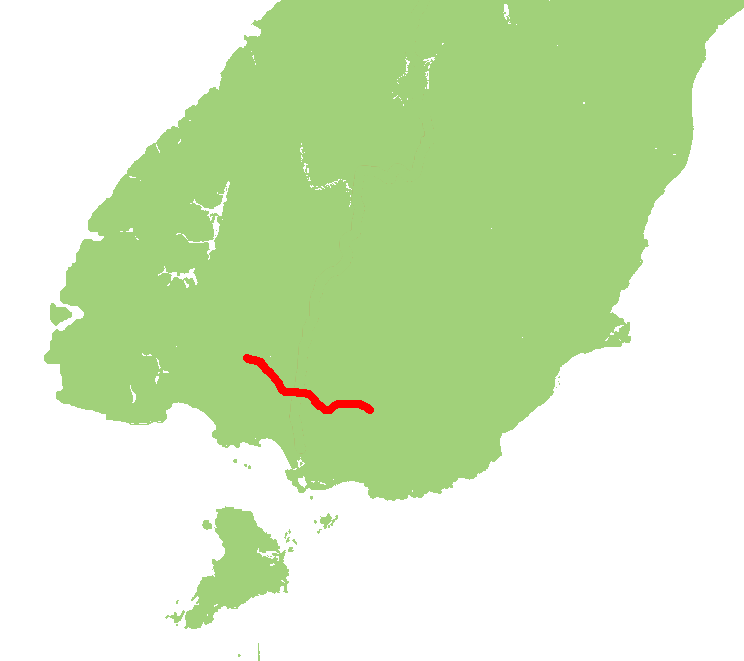

Route information
- Maintained by NZ Transport Agency Waka Kotahi
- Length: 92.0 km (57.2 mi)

Major junctions
- East end: SH 1 (Pioneer Highway) at Mataura
- West end: Ohai

Location
- Country: New Zealand
- Primary destinations: Hedgehope, Browns, Winton, Nightcaps

Highway system
- New Zealand state highways; Motorways and expressways; List
← SH 95	→ SH 97

State Highway 96 is a New Zealand state highway connecting the Southland communities of Mataura, Winton, and Ohai. Starting at State Highway 1 the highway is 92 kilometres (57 mi) in length and runs in a general east–west direction. In Winton State Highway 96 runs concurrently with State Highway 6 for 1.6 kilometres (0.99 mi) kilometres.

== Route ==
SH 96 starts just south of Mataura in the Mataura River Valley and rises to the feet of the Hokonui Hills. The highway skirts the southern end of the hills as it passes through the localities of Te Tipua, Waitane and Glencoe. At Hedgehope, the road swings towards the northwest from the west as it passes through Springhills and Browns to emerge on the Southland Plains at Winton, the highway begins its 1.6 km long concurrency with State Highway 6.

After ending concurrency and crossing the Ōreti and Aparima Rivers the highway continues proceeding in a north-westerly direction towards Wreys Bush and Nightcaps. The highway eventually terminates in the coal-mining community of Ohai, but the road itself continues skirting the Longwood Range, and becomes State Highway 99 at Clifden.

== See also ==
- List of New Zealand state highways
