= Rakahouka =

Coordinates: 46°19′S 168°29′E

Rakahouka is a community in the Southland region of New Zealand's South Island. It is located in a fertile farming area on the Southland Plains just south of the Makarewa River. The nearest major city, Invercargill, is approximately 15 km to the southwest, and nearby villages include Grove Bush and Mabel Bush to the north, Woodlands to the southeast, and Myross Bush and Roslyn Bush to the southwest.

State Highway 98, which links Lorneville and Dacre, runs through Rakahouka.

For governance purposes, Rakahouka is included in the Ōreti ward, and Rakahouka's residents vote to elect Ōreti council members who represent them in the Southland District Council.
