= Longbush =

Longbush may refer to:

- Longbush, Southland, New Zealand
- Longbush, Wellington, New Zealand
