= Myross Bush =

- Locality
- Interactive map of Myross Bush
- Coordinates: 46°22′S 168°25′E
- Country: New Zealand
- Region: Southland region
- Territorial authority: Invercargill
- Electorates: Invercargill; Te Tai Tonga (Māori)

Government
  - Territorial authority: Southland District Council
  - Regional council: Southland Regional Council
  - Mayor of Southland: Rob Scott
  - Invercargill MP: Penny Simmonds
  - Te Tai Tonga MP: Tākuta Ferris

Area
  - Total: 19.11 km^{2} (7.38 sq mi)

Population (June 2025)
  - Total: 1,060
  - Density: 55.5/km^{2} (144/sq mi)
- Local iwi: Ngāi Tahu

Myross Bush is a rural community on the northeastern outskirts of the city of Invercargill in the Southland region of New Zealand's South Island. Other nearby settlements include Makarewa to the northwest, Rakahouka and Roslyn Bush to the northeast, and Kennington to the southeast.

== Demographics ==
Myross Bush statistical area covers 19.11 km^{2} (7.38 sq mi). It had an estimated population of 1,060 as of June 2025, with a population density of 55 people per km^{2}.

Historical population
Year	Pop.	±% p.a.
2006	963	—
2013	1,050	+1.24%
2018	1,134	+1.55%

Before the 2023 census, Myross Bush had a larger boundary, covering 20.49 km^{2} (7.91 sq mi). Using that boundary, Myross Bush had a population of 1,134 at the 2018 New Zealand census, an increase of 84 people (8.0%) since the 2013 census, and an increase of 171 people (17.8%) since the 2006 census. There were 384 households, comprising 576 males and 561 females, giving a sex ratio of 1.03 males per female. The median age was 44.6 years (compared with 37.4 years nationally), with 243 people (21.4%) aged under 15 years, 156 (13.8%) aged 15 to 29, 588 (51.9%) aged 30 to 64, and 150 (13.2%) aged 65 or older.

Ethnicities were 96.3% European/Pākehā, 7.1% Māori, 0.8% Pasifika, 0.5% Asian, and 0.8% other ethnicities. People may identify with more than one ethnicity.

The percentage of people born overseas was 6.3, compared with 27.1% nationally.

Although some people chose not to answer the census's question about religious affiliation, 51.6% had no religion, 42.1% were Christian and 0.8% had other religions.

Of those at least 15 years old, 177 (19.9%) people had a bachelor's or higher degree, and 144 (16.2%) people had no formal qualifications. The median income was $46,800, compared with $31,800 nationally. 267 people (30.0%) earned over $70,000 compared to 17.2% nationally. The employment status of those at least 15 was that 510 (57.2%) people were employed full-time, 162 (18.2%) were part-time, and 12 (1.3%) were unemployed.

== Education ==
Myross Bush School is a contributing primary school serving years 1 to 6 with a roll of 170 students as of July 2026. The school opened in 1866 and moved to its current site in 1868.
