= Waimea River, New Zealand =

Waimea River may refer to either of two rivers at opposite ends of the South Island of New Zealand, both surrounded by fertile floodplains known locally as the Waimea Plains:

- Waimea River (Southland), a tributary of the Mataura River in Southland, New Zealand
- Waimea River (Tasman), flowing into Tasman Bay near Appleby
