= Waitane =

Area of New Zealand

Coordinates: 46°11′S 168°42′E

Waitane is a locality in the Southland region of New Zealand's South Island in the foothills of the Hokonui Hills. It is located in a rural setting on State Highway 96 between Glencoe and Te Tipua. The nearest sizeable town is Mataura to the east, while the main city of Southland, Invercargill, is southwest.
