= Longbush, Southland =

Community in Southland, New Zealand

Coordinates: 46°23′S 168°30′E

Longbush is a community in the Southland region of New Zealand's South Island. It is located in a rural area outside the city of Invercargill on the banks of the Waihopai River. Just to the northeast is the larger town of Woodlands.There are two possible origins of the name Longbush, with one being that it is simply named after the shape of the bush. The second, however, is that it was named by the first travellers between Invercargill and Dunedin "and used the term as an indication of the length and weariness of the journey."

The community is located on State Highway 1 and the Main South Line railway between Kennington and Dacre. Also nearby is the village of Rakahouka. Passenger trains have not operated on the railway through Longbush since the cancellation of the Southerner on 10 February 2002, though this express service did not actually stop in Longbush either.
