= Mabel Bush =

Coordinates: 46°17′S 168°32′E

Mabel Bush Whakahirahira Puihi (Māori)
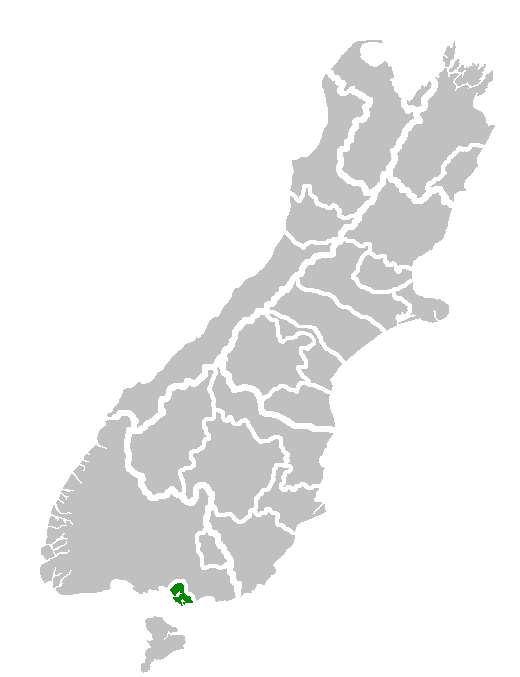
- Mabel Bush's location within the South Island
- Country: New Zealand
- Island: South Island
- Region: Southland
- Territorial authority: Southland District Council

Area
  - Territorial: 50 km^{2} (19 sq mi)

Population (2008)
  - Territorial: 127(Estimate)
- Time zone: UTC+12 (NZST)
  - Summer (DST): UTC+13 (NZDT)
- Postcode(s): 9872
- Area code: 03
- Local iwi: Ngāi Tahu

Mabel Bush is a small community in the Southland region of New Zealand's South Island. The community has an estimated population of 127 people. The main building in the area is the Mabel Bush Hall, which consists of the hall and tennis courts. The Hall is mainly used for parties and community events.

== Geography ==
Much of the surrounding area is farmland. Although the area is named Mabel Bush, only an approximate two hectares of the area is undeveloped native bush. Residents describe the area as a "happy medium" between hilly and flat.

The closest city is Invercargill, approximately twenty kilometres away. Nearby villages include Hedgehope to the north, Grove Bush to the west, Rakahouka to the southwest, and Dacre to the southeast.

The nearby Makarewa River is sometimes visited by anglers, and holds numerous brown trout and, downstream, perch.

== Wildlife ==
The area contains livestock such as sheep, cows and deer. Dogs are used to herd the livestock.

Wildlife includes many of New Zealand's common birds, as well as the Australian masked lapwing and hawks. Kiwis can be found here as well.

== Plantlife ==
There are many types of plant life in the Mabel Bush area, largely consisting of common New Zealand plants. There is a range of trees from introduced species such as pines and eucalyptus to native bush.

== Climate ==
Mabel Bush has a temperate oceanic climate similar to that of the British Isles. The mean daily temperature ranges from 5.2 °C in July to 14 °C in January. The yearly mean temperature is 9.9 °C. Rainfall averages 1112 mm annually, and measurable snowfall is occasionally seen during the winter months of June to September. It is the cloudiest centre of New Zealand with 1580 hours of sunshine per annum.

The average temperature high ranges from 18.8 °C in February to 11 °C in August. Owing to its relatively high latitude (46° 42'), the city enjoys nearly 16 hours of daylight at the summer solstice in late December.

Climate data for Mabel Bush
Month	Jan	Feb	Mar	Apr	May	Jun	Jul	Aug	Sep	Oct	Nov	Dec	Year
Mean daily maximum °C (°F)	18.6 (65.5)	18.8 (65.8)	17.2 (63.0)	15 (59)	12.2 (54.0)	9.7 (49.5)	9.5 (49.1)	11 (52)	12.9 (55.2)	14.4 (57.9)	15.8 (60.4)	17.5 (63.5)	14.4 (57.9)
Mean daily minimum °C (°F)	9.4 (48.9)	9.1 (48.4)	7.7 (45.9)	5.8 (42.4)	3.7 (38.7)	1.5 (34.7)	0.9 (33.6)	1.9 (35.4)	3.7 (38.7)	5.5 (41.9)	6.8 (44.2)	8.4 (47.1)	5.4 (41.7)
Average precipitation mm (inches)	114 (4.5)	79 (3.1)	94 (3.7)	100 (3.9)	114 (4.5)	99 (3.9)	88 (3.5)	71 (2.8)	80 (3.1)	95 (3.7)	81 (3.2)	100 (3.9)	1,112 (43.8)
Source: NIWA Climate Data
