= Wairio Branch =

Overview
- Other names: Ohai Line; Ohai Industrial Line
- Status: Open (first 9km); Mothballed beyond Lorneville
- Owner: KiwiRail
- Locale: Southland, New Zealand
- Termini: Invercargill; Wairio/Ohai
- Connecting lines: KiwiRail Main South Line

Service
- Type: Heavy Rail
- System: New Zealand Government Railways (NZGR)
- Operator(s): Railways Department; Ohai Railway Board (past)

History
- Opened: 2 February 1882 (to Wairio)
- Absorbed Ohai Branch: 1992
- Mothballed beyond Lorneville: 2025
- Closed: Passenger: 28 June 1954

Technical
- Line length: 66.4 km (41.3 mi)
- Number of tracks: Single
- Character: Rural, at-grade
- Track gauge: 3 ft 6 in (1,067 mm)

Map

The Ohai Line, formerly known as the Ohai Industrial Line and previously the Wairio Branch and the Ohai Railway Board's line, is a 54.5 km branch line railway in Southland, New Zealand. It opened in 1882 and is one of two remaining branch lines in Southland, and one of only a few in the country. A number of smaller privately owned railways fanned out from Wairio; one of these lines, to Ohai, was originally built by the Ohai Railway Board and was worked by New Zealand Railways from 1990 and incorporated into the national network in 1992. The line is currently out of use north of the Lorneville marshalling yards that serve the large Alliance freezing works and private spur line. In 2025, the line's sole customer north of Lorneville, Bathurst Resources, announced that the last coal mine it operates in the region (Takitimu) will close in 2027, with the railing of coal from Invercargill coming to an end in 2026. The first 9km of the line will be retained to Lorneville to serve the Alliance Freezing Works.

== Construction ==
=== Wairio Branch ===
Built at about the same time as the Riverton section of the Tuatapere Branch, what became the Wairio Branch left the Tuatapere Branch at Thornbury, where the junction originally faced Riverton rather than Invercargill, implying that the developers might have thought Riverton was going to be the region's major port. The line was built to open up new land to settlement and agricultural use and to access coal deposits. In 1879 it was opened to Otautau, and to Wairio on 3 March 1882, where it connected with private railways.

When the Tuatapere Branch closed in 1978 the Thornbury to Makarewa section became part of the Wairio Branch, and the closure of the Kingston Branch in 1982 meant that the continuation line to Invercargill section was also incorporated into the branch. This latter section of line is one of the oldest in New Zealand; built with wooden rails, it opened in 1864.

=== Private coal lines from Wairio ===
The development of private railway lines beyond Wairio was somewhat complex. The first was established not long after the Wairio Branch was opened and was a privately owned extension of a little over 2 miles (3.2 km) to the Nightcaps Coal Company in nearby Nightcaps, and operated by the Railways Department. The roads in the Ohai area in 1909 were described as "unspeakably bad" in a publication of the Ohai Railway Board in 1925; although significant coal deposits were in the area, it was difficult and hardly viable to transport the coal the short distance to the railway in Nightcaps. For this reason, another line from Wairio was proposed, but delays and negotiations meant that it did not open until June 1914. This line was operated by the Wairio Railway & Coal Company (WR&CC) and it served two additional mines in Moretown, a locality south of Ohai, but like the Nightcaps railway line, it did not provide reasonable access to Ohai's mines. Thus a third line was required.

While the WR&CC's line was under construction, mining interests in Ohai united to present a petition that the government acquire the WR&CC line and extend it into Ohai. Unfortunately, the arguments in favour of this proposal were presented to a parliamentary committee in 1914 just as World War I broke out and further consideration of the proposal was postponed. However, later that year the Local Railways Act was passed and, despite objections from the Nightcaps Coal Company and others in Nightcaps, the Ohai Railway District was declared on 4 May 1916. The declaration of this District included a condition that the Ohai Railway Board had to acquire the WR&CC line before constructing any new railway. The case for acquisition went to a compensation court, and, upon paying the sum of 19,862 pounds 6 shillings and 6 pence, the Ohai Railway Board took control of the WR&CC line on 22 June 1917.

The trackage acquired from the WR&CC was built to the low standards of a bush tramway, unsatisfactory as a permanent line. It could not even be appropriately extended into Ohai, though in 1919 an extension of 1 5/8 miles was opened to serve mines in the locality of Mossbank. In 1918 a proposal to build a third line directly from Wairio to Ohai was made, and it included a small deviation through Morley Village, considered part of Nightcaps. The construction of the line was opposed by the Nightcaps Coal Company, but after two commissions were held, approval was granted and construction commenced in July 1919. The first section was opened for traffic to Tinkers on 1 September 1920, but due to difficulties with the terrain it was not completed to Ohai until December 1924 and opened to traffic in the new year. In 1934 the line reached its ultimate terminus of Birchwood, 19 kilometres from Wairio. As the railway was built to national standards, the Ohai Railway Board suggested that the government could acquire it as the start of a route northwards to Lakes Te Anau and Manapouri, but nothing came of this.

== Operation ==
Freight trains off the Wairio Branch were largely industrial, and passengers were carried from Wairio to Invercargill from the line's opening until well into the 20th century. Due to decay of the old WR&CC line, the Railways Department stated that it would not permit its wagons to be used on the line after 31 December 1924, and thus the timing of the opening of the line to Ohai at the start of January 1925 proved to be fortuitous as it could carry traffic from the mines that had previously utilised the WR&CC route. Later in 1925 the Nightcaps Coal Company shut down operations and its railway extension was acquired by the Railways Department, which dismantled it in 1926.

The Ohai Railway Board used locomotives bought from the Railways Department as motive power - initially one C and two F^{A} class locomotives, later replaced by an X class tender engine and a W^{AB} class tank locomotive. Upon dieselisation in the 1960s, small diesel shunters such as a DSA class were used, and then a DJ class locomotive was employed.

In the early 1990s, the Ohai line was incorporated into the national network and the line beyond Wairio became known as the Ohai Industrial Line. The motive power used on the line from this stage was the same as that employed to haul the train from Invercargill. Presently, one train runs every weekday from Invercargill and return, arriving at Ohai at 9.30 am and leaving two hours later. This service operates on Saturdays and Sundays when required. In June 2007, the Southland District Council adopted as part of the Otago Regional Land Transport Strategy a provision to upgrade the Ohai line and maintain it as a viable alternative to a road for bulk freight.

On 15 May 2008 Fonterra and Eastern Coal Holdings reached an agreement to continue to rail coal from Eastern Coal's Takitimu mining operations in the Ohai/Nightcaps district to Fonterra's Clandeboye dairy factory. Under this new contract, approximately 120,000 tonnes of coal will be carried annually by the Ohai line. After infrastructural upgrades such as a new rail load-out system were undertaken, the contract came into effect on 1 September 2008; to fulfil it, trainloads of up to 550 tonnes of coal leave the Branch daily. In 2011, KiwiRail undertook a refurbishment of the line with a large resleepering and bridge strengthening projects to allow larger, heavier, containerised coal trains to operate, while allowing for an increase in speed. This work was completed in late 2012.

On 11 January 2021 a freight train of eight wagons each carrying two empty coal containers derailed at Wright's Bush between Thornbury and Makarewa; the track was expected by KiwiRail to take about a week to repair. Following the derailment it was announced that KiwiRail and Bathurst Resources had agreed $5.2 million would be spent on maintenance of the line, as well as track upgrades.

In early 2024 a sizable flood water surge in the Aparima river caused considerable flotsam damage to a bridge pier on the sizable bridge near Thornbury. KiwiRail immediately suspended all rail operations on the line north of the Lorneville marshalling yards that serve the substantial Alliance freezing works private line. Planning for repair works was put on hold in 2025 due to legal difficulties in altering the Aparima river flow to allow the replacement of a damaged pier.

Coal from the Takitimu mine is now transported by truck to Invercargill railway yards to be loaded onto trains there. In 2025, Bathurst Resources announced that the Takitimu Mine will close in 2027, with the railing of coal from Invercargill coming to an end in 2026.

== See also ==
- Ohai Railway Board
- Ohai Railway Board Heritage Trust
- Main South Line
- Kingston Branch
- Bluff Branch
- Browns/Hedgehope Branch
- Seaward Bush/Tokanui Branch
- Tuatapere & Orawia Branches
