= Nightcaps, New Zealand =

Nightcaps
- Interactive map of Nightcaps
- Coordinates: 45°58′S 168°02′E
- Country: New Zealand
- Island: South Island
- Region: Southland region
- Territorial authorities of New Zealand: Southland District
- Ward: Waiau Aparima Ward
- Community: Wallace Takitimu Community
- Electorates: Invercargill; Te Tai Tonga (Māori)

Government
  - Territorial authority: Southland District Council
  - Regional council: Southland Regional Council
  - Mayor of Southland: Rob Scott
  - Invercargill MP: Penny Simmonds
  - Te Tai Tonga MP: Tākuta Ferris

Area
  - Total: 1.67 km^{2} (0.64 sq mi)

Population (June 2025)
  - Total: 310
  - Density: 190/km^{2} (480/sq mi)

Nightcaps is a town in the Southland region of New Zealand's South Island. It is suggested that Nightcaps got its name either from the snow that is often seen on the Takitimu Mountains, or when early settlers observed fog on the hills known as the Nobbles. State Highway 96 passes through Nightcaps as it runs between Ohai and Winton. The town has a golf course and two primary schools that cater to students from Nightcaps, the surrounding rural area, and since the 2003 closure of its own school, Ohai.

Nightcaps has a more industrial history than most Southland towns due to nearby coal deposits. A private railway was built from the terminus of the New Zealand Railways Department's Wairio Branch to Nightcaps to provide more efficient transport of coal; operated by the Nightcaps Coal Company, it opened not long after the state's railway reached Wairio in 1909. In 1918, a proposal was made to build another line to coal interests around Ohai, and the construction of this line was fiercely opposed by the Nightcaps Coal Company, fearing a loss of business. However, construction was approved in July 1919 with a deviation through Morley Village, considered part of Nightcaps. The first section of the line, including the part serving Morley Village, opened on 1 September 1920. Ohai was reached four years later, and in 1925, the Nightcaps Coal Company ceased to operate; they handed over their railway line to the Railways Department, who dismantled it in 1926 as the Ohai line was capable of catering for traffic from Nightcaps. The Ohai line continues to operate, primarily for the carriage of coal, and it is one of the few remaining rural branch lines out of many that once existed throughout New Zealand. It has been part of the national rail network since 1 June 1990.

In 1980, the coal industry started to decline in Nightcaps, brought on by increasing automation of labour. There is one significant coal mine operating in Nightcaps, the Takitimu Coal Mine which has been run by Bathurst Resources since 2011. In 2021 Bathurst Resources announced that they are seeking to develop a new pit, the New Brighton project, which would add an additional 2–4 years of longevity to Bathurst's coal production in Southland. Environmental organisations criticised this, with Forest and Bird requesting a judicial review stating that the Southern District Council did not adequately consider climate change in its approval of exploration for the expansion. That said, the applicable legislation is the Crown Minerals Act 1991, which does not cover climate change issue. The Takitimu mine currently produces around 200,000 tonnes of coal a year for domestic customers, mostly in food processing, including for export. The New Zealand Government recognised the importance of coal mining for New Zealand food production during the 2020 COVID-19 lockdown, as an "essential service", and in 2021, as a "key utility".

== Demographics ==
Nightcaps is described as a rural settlement by Statistics New Zealand. It covers 1.67 km^{2} (0.64 sq mi), and had an estimated population of 310 as of June 2025, with a population density of 186 people per km^{2}. It is part of the much larger Ohai-Nightcaps statistical area.

Historical population for Nightcaps settlement
Year	Pop.	±% p.a.
2006	309	—
2013	294	−0.71%
2018	306	+0.80%

Before the 2023 census, Nightcaps had a larger boundary, covering 3.19 km^{2} (1.23 sq mi). Using that boundary, Nightcaps had a population of 306 at the 2018 New Zealand census, an increase of 12 people (4.1%) since the 2013 census, and a decrease of 3 people (−1.0%) since the 2006 census. There were 138 households, comprising 165 males and 138 females, giving a sex ratio of 1.2 males per female, with 51 people (16.7%) aged under 15 years, 39 (12.7%) aged 15 to 29, 144 (47.1%) aged 30 to 64, and 75 (24.5%) aged 65 or older.

Ethnicities were 90.2% European/Pākehā, 17.6% Māori, 1.0% Pasifika, and 2.0% other ethnicities. People may identify with more than one ethnicity.

Although some people chose not to answer the census's question about religious affiliation, 45.1% had no religion, 41.2% were Christian, 2.0% had Māori religious beliefs and 1.0% had other religions.

Of those at least 15 years old, 30 (11.8%) people had a bachelor's or higher degree, and 99 (38.8%) people had no formal qualifications. 12 people (4.7%) earned over $70,000 compared to 17.2% nationally. The employment status of those at least 15 was that 96 (37.6%) people were employed full-time, 45 (17.6%) were part-time, and 18 (7.1%) were unemployed.

=== Ohai-Nightcaps statistical area ===
Ohai-Nightcaps covers 948.80 km^{2} (366.33 sq mi) and also includes Ohai, Wairio and Wreys Bush. It had an estimated population of 1,650 as of June 2025, with a population density of 1.7 people per km^{2}.

Historical population for Ohai-Nightcaps
Year	Pop.	±% p.a.
2006	1,533	—
2013	1,500	−0.31%
2018	1,482	−0.24%

Ohai-Nightcaps had a population of 1,482 at the 2018 New Zealand census, a decrease of 18 people (−1.2%) since the 2013 census, and a decrease of 51 people (−3.3%) since the 2006 census. There were 585 households, comprising 813 males and 666 females, giving a sex ratio of 1.22 males per female. The median age was 37.5 years (compared with 37.4 years nationally), with 318 people (21.5%) aged under 15 years, 279 (18.8%) aged 15 to 29, 696 (47.0%) aged 30 to 64, and 189 (12.8%) aged 65 or older.

Ethnicities were 81.6% European/Pākehā, 18.8% Māori, 1.4% Pasifika, 7.5% Asian, and 1.6% other ethnicities. People may identify with more than one ethnicity.

The percentage of people born overseas was 15.2, compared with 27.1% nationally.

Although some people chose not to answer the census's question about religious affiliation, 47.4% had no religion, 39.1% were Christian, 1.6% had Māori religious beliefs, 0.6% were Hindu, 0.6% were Buddhist and 1.6% had other religions.

Of those at least 15 years old, 105 (9.0%) people had a bachelor's or higher degree, and 327 (28.1%) people had no formal qualifications. The median income was $27,900, compared with $31,800 nationally. 132 people (11.3%) earned over $70,000 compared to 17.2% nationally. The employment status of those at least 15 was that 606 (52.1%) people were employed full-time, 186 (16.0%) were part-time, and 39 (3.4%) were unemployed.

== Education ==
Takitimu Primary School is a state full primary school for years 1 to 8 with a roll of 97 as of July 2026. Nightcaps School first opened in 1884 and Takitimu celebrated 125 years of education in the area in 2009.

St Patrick's School is a state-integrated Catholic school for years 1 to 8 with a roll of 17. It opened in 1917.
