= Hedgehope Branch =

Branch railway line in the South Island of New Zealand

Map

The Hedgehope Branch, also known as the Browns Branch, was a branch line railway in Southland, New Zealand that started life in the 1880s as a privately owned bush tramway. It opened as a railway in 1899 and operated until 1968, though the section beyond Browns closed in 1953. It connected with the national rail network in Winton on the Kingston Branch.

== Construction ==
In 1883, the Forest Hill Tramway was established and a line that ran eight kilometres west of Winton to settlers in the Browns Gap area was constructed. Although the line was not particularly successful, the Hokonui Coal Company extended it in 1886 to serve their coal mining operations near the settlement of Hokonui. The tramway was built to standards far inferior to those of a railway, and the decision to upgrade was made in the 1890s. In 1896, the Makarewa River was bridged, and over the next three years, the old tramway was rebuilt to railway standards and the line was extended to Hedgehope. The line was completed in 1899 and was handed over to the government's Railways Department in time for the grand opening on 17 July 1899.

== Stations ==
The following stations were located on the Hedgehope Branch (in brackets is the distance from Winton):

- Devereux Road (4 km)
- Kings (5 km)
- Browns (9 km)
- Hokonui (14 km)
- Springhills Siding (16 km)
- Mako (19 km)
- Hedgehope (21 km)

== Operation ==
The line's passenger services barely lasted three decades, with cancellation coming on 9 February 1931. Unlike most branches in Southland, the Hedgehope Branch had significant industrial traffic, mainly coal and agricultural lime, and trains ran five days a week. The line was losing money by 1930, and despite staff cuts, the losses were relatively the same in 1952. As most of the lime traffic came from the stations of Kings and Browns, the section beyond Browns to Hedgehope was accordingly closed on 24 December 1953. Roughly 75,000 tonnes of lime was being railed off the branch annually until 1959, when government incentives for farmers to transport lime via rail were slashed. The line failed to survive the next problem to strike its lime trade. A significant quantity of lime was railed up the Tokanui Branch, but when it closed in early 1966, the Browns Branch saw its traffic almost evaporate. After struggling through the rest of the year and 1967, it was closed on 1 January 1968.

== Today ==
There is very little left of the Hedgehope Branch, with both nature and human development removing most interesting traces. Some of the formation is faintly visible, but only one substantial remnant can be found - the truss bridge across the Makarewa River, converted to allow access to a farm. Otherwise, no goods sheds, loading banks, disused rails, or other railway structures and objects remain. Discernible flat areas are all that is left of the yards that once existed in the termini of Browns and Hedgehope.

== See also ==
- Main South Line
- Kingston Branch
- Bluff Branch
- Seaward Bush/Tokanui Branch
- Tuatapere & Orawia Branches
- Wairio/Ohai Branch
