= Windley River =

Location
- Country: New Zealand
- Region: Southland
- District: Southland

Physical characteristics
- Source: Eyre Mountains
  - coordinates: 45°24′32″S 168°13′34″E
- Mouth: Ōreti River
  - coordinates: 45°32′42″S 168°09′0″E
  - elevation: 390 metres (1,280 ft)
- Length: 27 kilometres (17 mi)

Basin features
- Progression: Windley River → Ōreti River
- River system: Ōreti River

The Windley River is a river in the Eyre Mountains, New Zealand. It is a tributary of the Ōreti River, joining that river 6 kilometres (4 mi) north-east of Centre Hill.

== See also ==
- List of rivers of New Zealand
