= Hedgehope, New Zealand =

Hedgehope
- Interactive map of Hedgehope
- Coordinates: 46.207°S 168.547°E
- Country: New Zealand
- Region: Southland region
- Territorial authorities of New Zealand: Southland District
- Ward: Oreti Ward
- Community: Oreti Community
- Electorates: Invercargill; Te Tai Tonga (Māori)

Government
  - Territorial authority: Southland District Council
  - Regional council: Southland Regional Council
  - Mayor of Southland: Rob Scott
  - Invercargill MP: Penny Simmonds
  - Te Tai Tonga MP: Mananui Ramsden
- Time zone: UTC+12:00 (NZST)
- Local iwi: Ngāi Tahu

Hedgehope Hill. Height: 714m. View from south.

Hedgehope is a locality in the central Southland region of New Zealand's South Island.

Located in the Hokonui Hills, Winton is to the west, Mataura to the east, and Mabel Bush to the south. The nearest city is Invercargill, over 25 km to the southwest. State Highway 96 passes through Hedgehope as it travels between Springhills and Glencoe.

Hedgehope is named for the nearby Mount Hedgehope. The surveyor John Turnbull Thomson named the mountain after the second-highest peak in the Cheviot Hills of his native Northumberland.

Hedgehope was also once the terminus of the Hedgehope Branch railway. On 17 July 1899, a branch line diverging from the Kingston Branch in Winton was opened to Hedgehope and it served the town for over half a century. Due to low demand, passengers always had to travel in carriages attached to slow freight services; these were known as mixed trains. The rise of private car ownership in the 1920s caused the quantity of passengers to slip to levels unsustainable for even mixed trains, and accordingly passenger provisions were cancelled from 9 February 1931. Freight quantities also steadily declined, and in the early 1950s, the decision was taken to close over half the branch. On 24 December 1953, the branch was truncated to Browns and Hedgehope's railway service fully ceased. Today, there is little evidence left of the railway's existence apart from some of its former formation.

== Demographics ==
The Hedgehope statistical area covers 729.26 km^{2} (281.57 sq mi) and had an estimated population of 1,220 as of June 2025, with a population density of 1.7 people per km^{2}.

Historical population
Year	Pop.	±% p.a.
2006	1,044	—
2013	1,110	+0.88%
2018	1,179	+1.21%

The statistical area had a population of 1,179 at the 2018 New Zealand census, an increase of 69 people (6.2%) since the 2013 census, and an increase of 135 people (12.9%) since the 2006 census. There were 414 households, comprising 600 males and 579 females, giving a sex ratio of 1.04 males per female. The median age was 35.6 years (compared with 37.4 years nationally), with 306 people (26.0%) aged under 15 years, 195 (16.5%) aged 15 to 29, 564 (47.8%) aged 30 to 64, and 114 (9.7%) aged 65 or older.

Ethnicities were 89.6% European/Pākehā, 9.7% Māori, 6.4% Asian, and 2.3% other ethnicities. People may identify with more than one ethnicity.

The percentage of people born overseas was 13.7, compared with 27.1% nationally.

Although some people chose not to answer the census's question about religious affiliation, 49.1% had no religion, 40.7% were Christian, 0.3% had Māori religious beliefs, 0.5% were Hindu and 1.3% had other religions.

Of those at least 15 years old, 138 (15.8%) people had a bachelor's or higher degree, and 186 (21.3%) people had no formal qualifications. The median income was $43,700, compared with $31,800 nationally. 201 people (23.0%) earned over $70,000 compared to 17.2% nationally. The employment status of those at least 15 was that 528 (60.5%) people were employed full-time, 171 (19.6%) were part-time, and 21 (2.4%) were unemployed.

== Education ==
Hedgehope School is a full primary school for years 1 to 8 with a roll of 55 as of July 2026. The school first opened in 1878.
