= Woodlands, New Zealand =

Locality in Southland District, Southland Region, New Zealand

Woodlands
- Interactive map of Woodlands
- Coordinates: 46.355°S 168.550°E
- Country: New Zealand
- Region: Southland region
- Territorial authorities of New Zealand: Southland District
- Ward: Waihopai-Toetoe Ward
- Community board: Waihopai-Toetoe Community
- Electorates: Invercargill; Te Tai Tonga (Māori)

Government
  - Territorial authority: Southland District Council
  - Regional council: Southland Regional Council
  - Mayor of Southland: Rob Scott
  - Invercargill MP: Penny Simmonds
  - Te Tai Tonga MP: Tākuta Ferris

Area
  - Total: 24.01 km^{2} (9.27 sq mi)

Population (June 2025)
  - Total: 350
  - Density: 15/km^{2} (38/sq mi)
- Postcode(s): 9871
- Area code: 03

Woodlands is a small town in the Southland region of New Zealand's South Island on the banks of the Waihopai River. It is northeast of Invercargill between Dacre and Longbush. Other nearby settlements are Rakahouka to the northwest and Rimu and Waituna to the south.

== Demographics ==
Woodlands is defined by Statistics New Zealand as a rural settlement. It covers 24.01 km^{2} (9.27 sq mi), and had an estimated population of 350 as of June 2025, with a population density of 15 people per km^{2}. It is part of the wider Edendale-Woodlands statistical area.

Historical population
Year	Pop.	±% p.a.
2006	255	—
2013	261	+0.33%
2018	273	+0.90%

Woodlands had a population of 273 at the 2018 New Zealand census, an increase of 12 people (4.6%) since the 2013 census, and an increase of 18 people (7.1%) since the 2006 census. There were 111 households, comprising 141 males and 135 females, giving a sex ratio of 1.04 males per female, with 51 people (18.7%) aged under 15 years, 39 (14.3%) aged 15 to 29, 144 (52.7%) aged 30 to 64, and 42 (15.4%) aged 65 or older.

Ethnicities were 87.9% European/Pākehā, 12.1% Māori, 1.1% Pasifika, and 7.7% Asian. People may identify with more than one ethnicity.

Although some people chose not to answer the census's question about religious affiliation, 46.2% had no religion, 45.1% were Christian, 1.1% had Māori religious beliefs and 2.2% had other religions.

Of those at least 15 years old, 27 (12.2%) people had a bachelor's or higher degree, and 54 (24.3%) people had no formal qualifications. 33 people (14.9%) earned over $70,000 compared to 17.2% nationally. The employment status of those at least 15 was that 132 (59.5%) people were employed full-time, 33 (14.9%) were part-time, and 12 (5.4%) were unemployed.

== Transport ==
The town is located on State Highway 1 and the Main South Line portion of the South Island Main Trunk Railway. The railway has been freight-only since the cancellation of the Southerner passenger express on 10 February 2002. During the construction of the Main South Line, Woodlands was briefly a railway terminus. The first section of the line out of Invercargill was opened to Woodlands on 11 February 1874. On 7 June 1875, the next section beyond Woodlands was opened to Mataura via Edendale.

== War memorial ==
A number of Woodlands residents fought overseas in World War I. A memorial to those who died stands in the town.

== Education ==
Woodlands Full Primary School caters for years 1 to 8 with a roll of 94 students as of March 2026. The school opened in 1871.
