= Waimea River (Southland) =

Physical characteristics
- Source
  - coordinates: 45.9575942794°S 168.676872253°E
- Length: 56 km (35 mi)

The Waimea River is a tributary of the Mataura River in Southland, New Zealand. The Waimea Plains around this river form part of the Southland Plains.
