= Te Tipua =

Coordinates: 46°11′05″S 168°45′54″E

Te Tipua is a rural farming community in the eastern Southland region of New Zealand's South Island.

It is west of the nearest town, Mataura, and northeast of Southland's major centre, Invercargill. State Highway 96 passes through Te Tipua as it runs between Waitane and its junction with State Highway 1 on the southern side of Mataura.

== Education ==
Te Tipua School is a co-educational contributing primary school for years 1 to 8 with a roll of 30 students as of November 2024.. It was established in 1907.
