= Winton, New Zealand =

Town in Southland, New Zealand

Winton
- Minor urban area
- Motto: The Heart of Southland
- Interactive map of Winton
- Coordinates: 46°08′35″S 168°19′25″E
- Country: New Zealand
- Region: Southland region
- Territorial authorities of New Zealand: Southland District
- Ward: Oreti Ward
- Community: Oreti Community
- Settled: c. 1861 by Thomas Winton
- Electorates: Southland; Te Tai Tonga (Māori)

Government
  - Territorial authority: Southland District Council
  - Regional council: Southland Regional Council
  - Mayor of Southland: Rob Scott
  - Southland MP: Joseph Mooney
  - Te Tai Tonga MP: Tākuta Ferris

Area
  - Land: 3.08 km^{2} (1.19 sq mi)
- Elevation: 51 m (167 ft)

Population (June 2025)
  - Total: 2,560
  - Density: 831/km^{2} (2,150/sq mi)
  - Demonym: Wintonian
- Time zone: UTC+12 (NZST)
  - Summer (DST): UTC+13 (NZDT)
- Postcode(s): 9720
- Area code: 03
- Local iwi: Ngāi Tahu
- Website: http://www.winton.co.nz

Winton is a rural town in Southland, New Zealand. It is located close to the east bank of the Ōreti River, 30 kilometres north of Invercargill and 50 kilometres south of Lumsden. The town is named after Thomas Winton, a local stockman who lived and farmed in the area in the 1850s. The district thrived with the development of sheep and fat-lamb farms in the early 1900s. Later, dairy farming became the staple economy, although the town has also seen sawmills, and flax and linen-flax industries.

Today, Winton is as an agricultural service town for local farmers and traders and as a stop-off for travellers on the Invercargill–Queenstown highway. Its population is not declining, partly because farmers retire there, attracted by a climate that is warmer, drier and calmer than Invercargill or Southland’s coastal districts. Population increases have also been driven by an influx of dairy workers who have migrated with their families from countries such as the Philippines and the Netherlands. Local businesses, worship centres and schools have welcomed the new community members.

State Highway 6 passes through the town between Queenstown and Invercargill. State Highway 96, a regional highway, connects east to the town of Mataura and west to Ohai.

== History ==
Winton was formerly a railway junction but is no longer served by any trains. On 22 February 1871, a railway line from Invercargill was opened to Winton, built to the international standard gauge of 1,435mm. This was the furthest extent of Southland's standard gauge network, and the next section to Caroline was built to New Zealand's national track gauge, 3 ft 6 in (1,067 mm) narrow gauge railway. This extension opened on 20 October 1875, ending Winton's 4.5 years as a railway terminus, and two months later, the line back to Invercargill was converted to 1,067mm gauge. This line grew to be the Kingston Branch. In 1883, a bush tramway was built eastwards from Winton, and in the 1890s, it was rebuilt to railway standards as a branch line and opened as the Hedgehope Branch on 17 July 1899. It established Winton as a railway junction, and the town functioned in this capacity until 1 January 1968, when the Hedgehope Branch closed. The Kingston line, once one of the more important lines in the country, declined during the 1970s, and most of it closed on 13 December 1982, including the portion through Winton. Today, little remains of Winton's railway, though its route can be discerned.

== Demographics ==
Winton covers 3.08 km^{2} (1.19 sq mi) and had an estimated population of 2,560 as of June 2025, with a population density of 831 people per km^{2}.

Historical population
Year	Pop.	±% p.a.
2006	2,094	—
2013	2,220	+0.84%
2018	2,337	+1.03%

Winton had a population of 2,337 at the 2018 New Zealand census, an increase of 117 people (5.3%) since the 2013 census, and an increase of 243 people (11.6%) since the 2006 census. There were 1,017 households, comprising 1,104 males and 1,233 females, giving a sex ratio of 0.9 males per female. The median age was 44.5 years (compared with 37.4 years nationally), with 438 people (18.7%) aged under 15 years, 348 (14.9%) aged 15 to 29, 921 (39.4%) aged 30 to 64, and 624 (26.7%) aged 65 or older.

Ethnicities were 90.9% European/Pākehā, 11.0% Māori, 1.8% Pasifika, 2.7% Asian, and 1.9% other ethnicities. People may identify with more than one ethnicity.

The percentage of people born overseas was 8.1, compared with 27.1% nationally.

Although some people chose not to answer the census's question about religious affiliation, 47.6% had no religion, 43.1% were Christian, 0.5% had Māori religious beliefs, 0.1% were Hindu, 0.4% were Muslim, 0.4% were Buddhist and 1.4% had other religions.

Of those at least 15 years old, 201 (10.6%) people had a bachelor's or higher degree, and 600 (31.6%) people had no formal qualifications. The median income was $31,500, compared with $31,800 nationally. 258 people (13.6%) earned over $70,000 compared to 17.2% nationally. The employment status of those at least 15 was that 846 (44.5%) people were employed full-time, 294 (15.5%) were part-time, and 45 (2.4%) were unemployed.

== Education ==
Winton School is a full primary school serving years 1 to 8 and had a roll of 263. A school existed in Winton from 1868, but 1870 is considered the starting date for this school. It shared a site with Winton District High School from 1901 to 1908 and from 1927 to 1964. The current school opened in 1965.

Central Southland College takes students from across Central Southland, including Winton, Otautau, Nightcaps, Ohai, Dipton, and Hedgehope, together with a large area of farmland. The school community is about 12% Māori. The Year 9 to 13 school and had a roll of 669 as of July 2026. The College opened in 1965 after the Winton District High School separated from the primary school.

St Thomas Aquinas School is a state-integrated Catholic full primary school serving years 1 to 8 and had a roll of 91. The school opened in 1898 and was rebuilt in 1966.

== Climate ==
The climate in Winton is temperate. It is generally warmer, drier and calmer than Invercargill or Southland’s coastal districts. There is a great deal of rainfall in Winton, even in the driest month. According to Köppen and Geiger, this climate is classified as 'oceanic' with high humidity year round. The average annual temperature in Winton is 9.9 °C and in a year, the average rainfall is 912 mm. The driest month is August, with 55 mm of rain. The greatest amount of precipitation occurs in January, with an average of 96 mm. January is the warmest month of the year with the temperature in averaging 14.5 °C. The lowest average temperatures in the year occur in July, when it is around 4.8 °C. There is a difference of 41 mm of precipitation between the driest and wettest months. The variation in temperatures throughout the year is 9.7 °C. Winton's highest temperature on record is 35.0 °C (95.0 °F), which was recorded on 14 January 2018.

Climate data for Winton (1991–2020 normals, extremes 1965–2019)
Month	Jan	Feb	Mar	Apr	May	Jun	Jul	Aug	Sep	Oct	Nov	Dec	Year
Record high °C (°F)	35.0 (95.0)	32.8 (91.0)	32.0 (89.6)	27.0 (80.6)	23.0 (73.4)	20.0 (68.0)	18.3 (64.9)	19.0 (66.2)	23.6 (74.5)	29.0 (84.2)	28.8 (83.8)	30.5 (86.9)	35.0 (95.0)
Mean daily maximum °C (°F)	20.5 (68.9)	20.3 (68.5)	18.7 (65.7)	15.9 (60.6)	13.2 (55.8)	10.4 (50.7)	10.2 (50.4)	11.8 (53.2)	13.9 (57.0)	15.5 (59.9)	17.0 (62.6)	19.3 (66.7)	15.6 (60.0)
Daily mean °C (°F)	15.0 (59.0)	14.7 (58.5)	13.1 (55.6)	10.8 (51.4)	8.5 (47.3)	6.2 (43.2)	5.7 (42.3)	7.0 (44.6)	8.9 (48.0)	10.4 (50.7)	11.8 (53.2)	13.9 (57.0)	10.5 (50.9)
Mean daily minimum °C (°F)	9.4 (48.9)	9.1 (48.4)	7.5 (45.5)	5.7 (42.3)	3.9 (39.0)	1.9 (35.4)	1.2 (34.2)	2.3 (36.1)	3.9 (39.0)	5.3 (41.5)	6.6 (43.9)	8.5 (47.3)	5.4 (41.8)
Record low °C (°F)	−0.6 (30.9)	−0.1 (31.8)	−2.2 (28.0)	−5.4 (22.3)	−5.0 (23.0)	−6.8 (19.8)	−8.3 (17.1)	−6.0 (21.2)	−5.4 (22.3)	−3.0 (26.6)	−1.4 (29.5)	−1.2 (29.8)	−8.3 (17.1)
Average rainfall mm (inches)	97.7 (3.85)	73.8 (2.91)	77.2 (3.04)	78.4 (3.09)	97.9 (3.85)	82.0 (3.23)	67.7 (2.67)	66.3 (2.61)	70.8 (2.79)	88.3 (3.48)	85.3 (3.36)	83.1 (3.27)	968.5 (38.15)
Mean monthly sunshine hours	173.1	165.4	148.3	127.3	85.6	82.6	103.8	117.2	137.2	169.0	169.6	157.3	1,636.4
Mean daily daylight hours	15.3	14.0	12.4	10.8	9.4	8.7	9.0	10.2	11.8	13.4	14.9	15.7	12.1
Percentage possible sunshine	36	42	39	39	29	32	37	37	39	41	38	32	37
Source 1: NIWA
Source 2: Weather Spark

== Notable people ==
- Minnie Dean, the only woman ever hanged in New Zealand, is buried in Winton cemetery
- David Hall, Southland rugby union player, was born in Winton
- Dr Harrison Fellowes, General Practitioner from Winton, now practising in Auckland
