= Dacre, New Zealand =

Town on the South Island, New Zealand

Coordinates: 46°19′S 168°38′E

Dacre is a small town in the South Island of New Zealand. It is situated on the Southland Plains between Invercargill and Edendale on State Highway 1. In Dacre, SH 1 is met by State Highway 98 (Lorneville – Dacre Road), which runs west to Makarewa via Rakahouka. Nearby villages include Mabel Bush to the northwest and Woodlands to the southeast. Dacre is 25 km north east of Invercargill, the closest city. The Main South Line railway passes just to the south of Dacre. It is a dairy farming community, that currently has a community hall and a small engine garage.

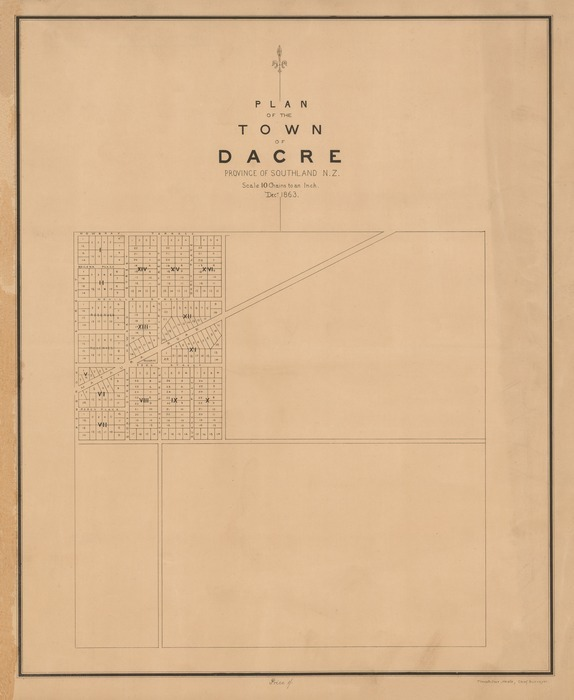
Plan of the town of Dacre, province of Southland, N.Z. [electronic resource] / Theophilus Heale, chief surveyor.

The town was first surveyed in December 1863 by Theophilus Heale, who was the chief surveyor of the region. It appears to be unknown where the name "Dacre" comes from, further backed up by an article from the Mataura Ensign in 1912, which states that:

"[Dacre] has a foreign appearance but by whom given the writer cannot say. (The old name of this locality was Halfway Bush, so named by Mr W. H. S. Roberts because it was midway between his house at Titipua [possibly a variation in the spelling of Te Tipua] and that of Mr McClymont's.)"

From 1863 until 1865, Dacre had a police station, owing to its strategic location between Invercargill and the Otago Goldfields. After the gold booms ended, the station was closed permanently, during a period of retrenchment which significantly reduced the number of police in Southland.

== Education ==
Dacre School, a Year 1 to 8 state primary school, operated in Dacre from 1900 to 2008. It was established in a former hotel.

When the school celebrated its centenary in 1999 it had two teachers. When it closed in 2008 it had just five students.
