= Southland Plains =

Plains in South Island, New Zealand

Coordinates: 46°20′05″S 168°12′37″E

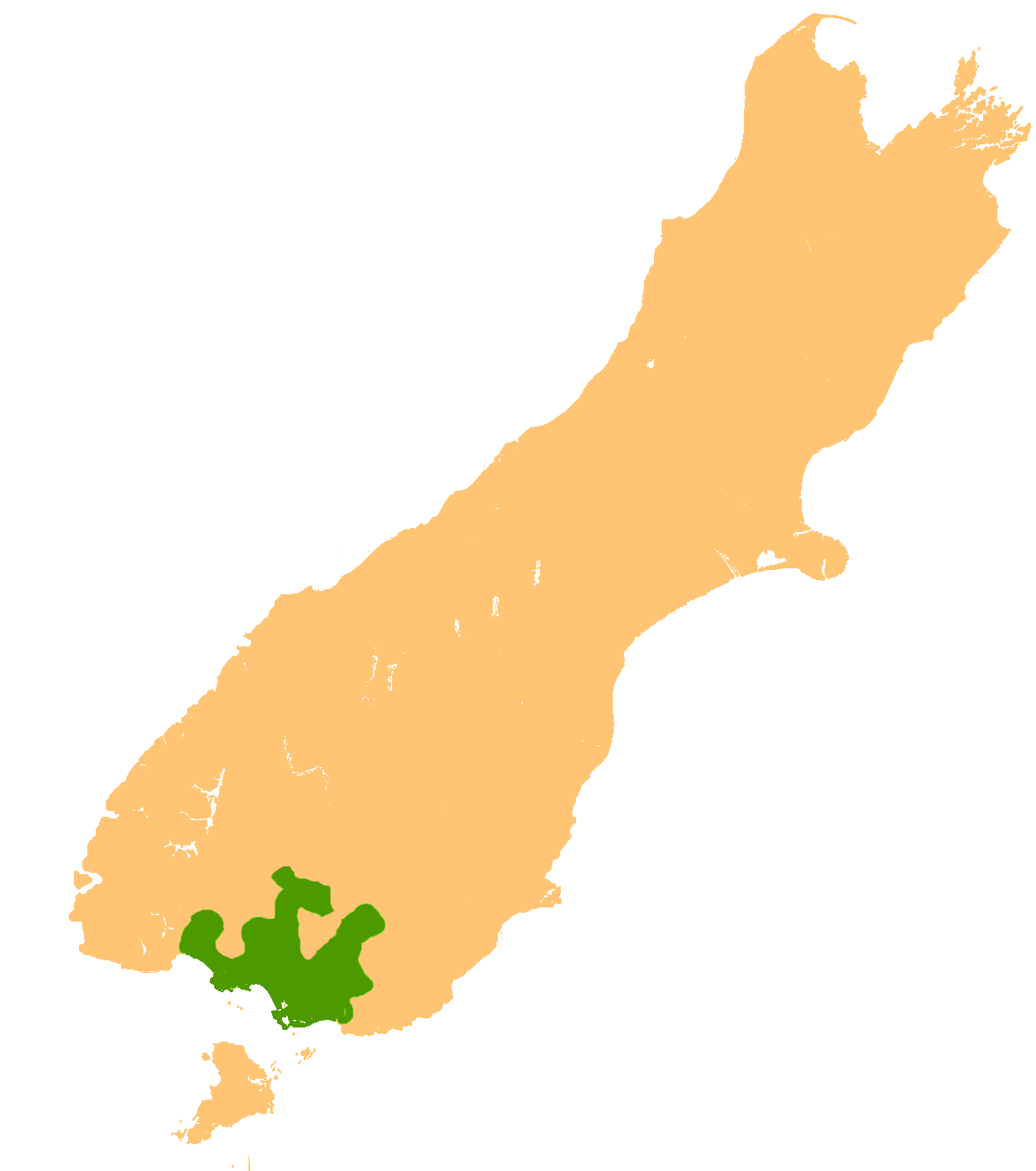
Location of the Southland Plains

The Southland Plains is a general name given to several areas of low-lying land in the South Island of New Zealand, separated by the rise of the Hokonui Hills in the north. It forms a sizeable area of Southland region and encompasses its two principal settlements the city of Invercargill and the town of Gore. The Southland Plains include some of New Zealand's most fertile farmland.

== Geography ==
The Plains extend from the Waiau River in the west to the Mataura River which forms the border with the Otago region to the east. It can be divided into three broad areas: the Southland plain proper, the Waimea Plains and the lower Waiau plain to the west near the Waiau river.

The Southland and Waimea Plains are separated by the uplands of the Hokonui Hills, which lie to the west of Gore. The Southland plain lies to the north of the city of Invercargill, and is formed by several large rivers, the Aparima, the Ōreti, and the Makarewa. They stretch inland for over 45 kilometres from the coast of the Foveaux Strait, and cover an area of close to 1500 km^{2}.

To the northeast of Invercargill, the Waimea Plains of the Mataura River and its tributary the Waimea River stretch inland as far as the town of Gore. At their southern extreme they become the Awarua Plain, a large area of marshy land which stretches from near Bluff to the foot of the Catlins in the far east. Between them, the lowlands around the Awarua Plain and Mataura River cover a further 2000 km^{2}.

To the west lies the lower Waiau plain which is situated around the mouth of the Waiau River. This smaller region is wedged between the Longwood Range to the east and Fiordland to the west.
