= Waihopai River (Southland) =

River in Southland, New Zealand

Coordinates: 46°25′08″S 168°20′12″E

The Waihopai River — the more southerly of two New Zealand rivers of that name — runs through the South Island's Southland Region. A narrow stream for much of its 40-kilometre (25 mi) length, it has its source in several streams arising in low hill country between Edendale and Dacre, all of which run generally west-southwest, passing through or close to the township of Woodlands. These streams gradually merge, becoming one river some 15 kilometres (9 mi) east of Invercargill. The Waihopai runs west from this point, passing through the northern suburbs of Invercargill City and then turns south, running between Invercargill's built-up area and Invercargill Airport, before flowing into the northern end of the New River Estuary at Stead Street Bridge.

The river lends its name to the Māori name for Invercargill, Waihōpai.
