= Ōreti River =

River in Southland, New Zealand

Ōreti River New River
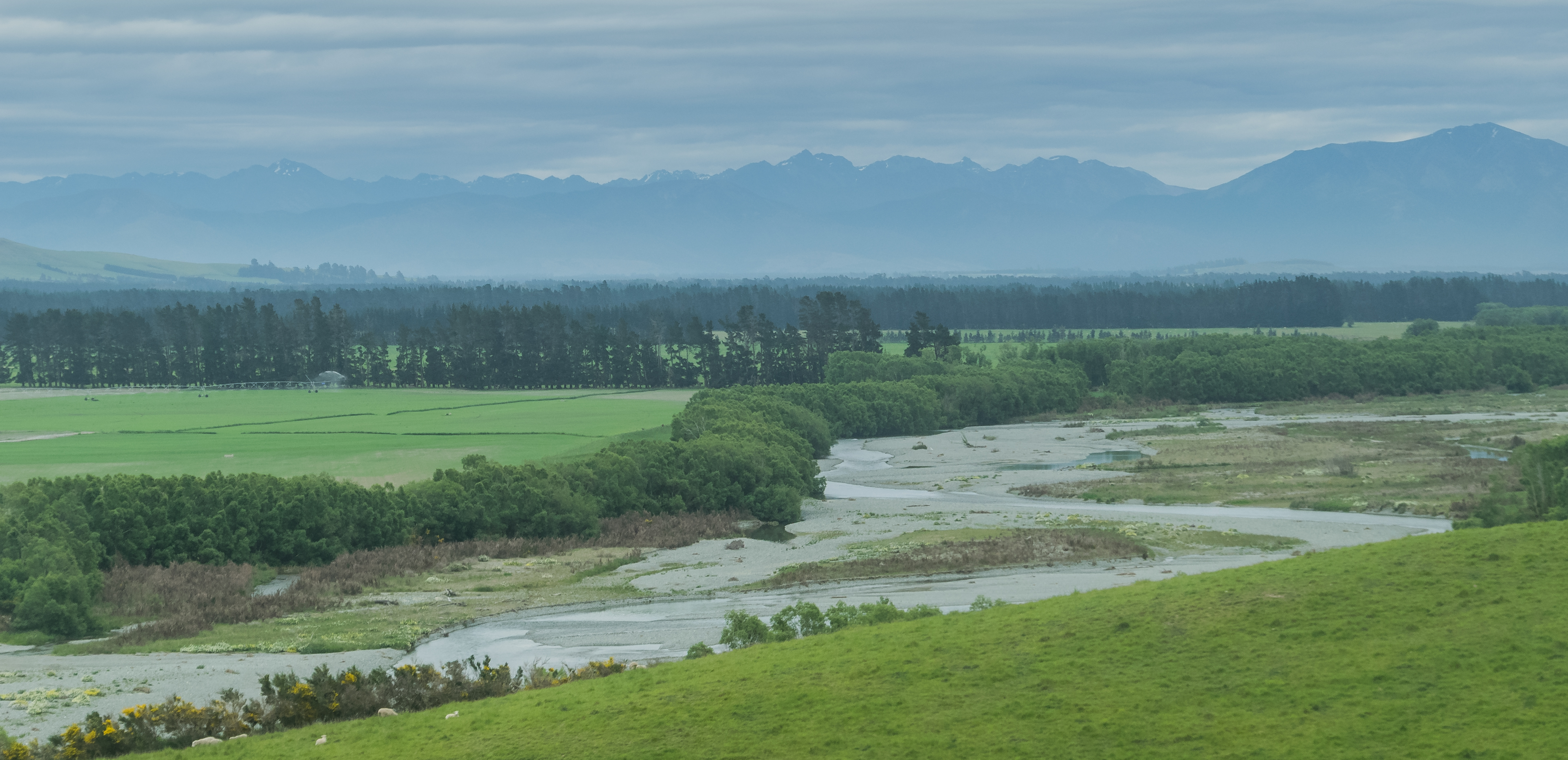
- Ōreti River near Lumsden

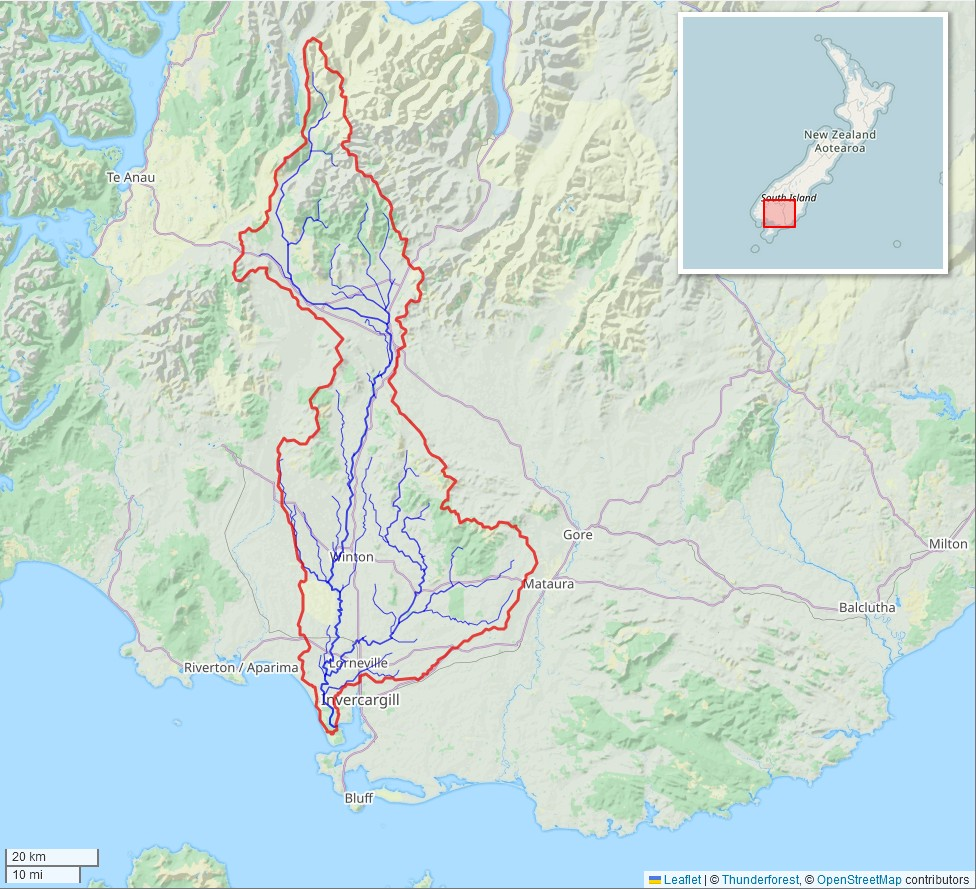
- Ōreti River watershed (Interactive map)
- Etymology: Maori meaning "river of canoes"
- Native name: Ōreti (Māori)

Location
- Country: New Zealand
- Region: Southland
- Cities: Invercargill

Physical characteristics
- Source: Thomson Mountains
  - coordinates: 45°9′18″S 168°12′43″E
- Mouth: New River Estuary
  - location: Foveaux Strait
  - coordinates: 46°28′S 168°17′E
  - elevation: Sea level
- Length: 170 kilometres (110 mi)

Basin features
- Tributaries
  - left: Makarewa River, Windley River

The Ōreti River (formerly the Oreti River) is one of the main rivers of Southland, New Zealand, and is 170 kilometres (110 mi) long. The river has been identified as an Important Bird Area by BirdLife International because, for much of its length, it supports breeding colonies of black-billed gulls.

The New Zealand Ministry for Culture and Heritage gives a translation of "place of the snare" for Ōreti. In November 2019, the name of the river was officially altered to Ōreti River.

The Ōreti has its headwaters close to the Mavora Lakes between Lake Te Anau and Lake Wakatipu, and flows south across the Southland Plains to its outflow into Foveaux Strait at the southeastern end of Oreti Beach. En route, it runs through the towns of Lumsden and Winton, before passing through the city of Invercargill, close to the river's estuary.

For the final part of the river's length, around the city of Invercargill and the river's estuary just south of the city, it is locally known as the New River, a name occasionally encountered to refer to the whole river. It shares this estuary with several smaller rivers, most notably the Waihopai River.

The New River Estuary, which meets the end of the Ōreti River before it reaches the sea, is in decline. Recent science reports show that regions of the upper estuary are under stress and showing eutrophication. There is excessive macroalgal growth including sediment quality decline and high concentrations of chlorophyll-a in the water column. Chlorophyll-a was used as an indicator of eutrophic conditions in the water column, and is a colour pigment present in many types of algae that can give an indication of how much algae is present in the water column.

The Invercargill Rowing Club relocated to the river in 1958.
