= Wairio =

Coordinates: 45°59′59″S 168°01′49″E

Wairio is a town in the Southland region of New Zealand's South Island.

The population was 942 in the 2013 census. This was an increase of 33 people since the 2006 Census.
