= Mataura =

Town in Southland, New Zealand

- Interactive map of Mataura
- Coordinates: 46°11′S 168°52′E
- Country: New Zealand
- Region: Southland region
- Territorial authorities of New Zealand: Gore District
- Ward: Mataura Ward
- Community board: Mataura Community Board
- Electorates: Southland; Te Tai Tonga (Māori)

Government
  - Territorial authority: Gore District Council
  - Regional council: Southland Regional Council
  - Mayor of Gore: Ben Bell
  - Southland MP: Joseph Mooney
  - Te Tai Tonga MP: Tākuta Ferris

Area
  - Territorial: 5.32 km^{2} (2.05 sq mi)

Population (June 2025)
  - Territorial: 1,670
  - Density: 314/km^{2} (813/sq mi)
- Time zone: UTC+12 (NZST)
  - Summer (DST): UTC+13 (NZDT)
- Area code: 03
- Local iwi: Ngāi Tahu

Mataura is a town in the Southland region of the South Island of New Zealand. Mataura has a meat processing plant, and until 2000 it was the site of a large pulp and paper mill.

== Geography ==
Mataura is situated on State Highway 1 and the Main South Line railway, on the eastern fringe of the Southland Plain 13 kilometres south west of Gore and 53 kilometres north east of Invercargill. On the southern side of the town, State Highway 96 diverges from SH 1 and runs westward through nearby communities such as Te Tipua and Waitane, ultimately terminating in Ohai. The town straddles the Mataura River which flows south through the town and is a source of brown trout. On the northern outskirts of the town the river falls over a bed of sandstone 6.1 metres (20 ft) high to create the Mataura Falls which is known by local Māori as Te Aunui (the great current).

The land rises to the Hokonui Hills 13 km to the north-west, while to the east is a series of hills.

== History and culture ==
=== Pre-European settlement ===
While there was no permanent Māori settlement in the present day location of Mataura prior to the arrival of European settlers, the location was well known to local Maori for the harvest of lamprey (which they called 'kana kana') in October of each year as they made their annual passage up the falls. The closest Māori settlement was the kaika (unfortified village) of Tūtūrau, which was located near the east bank of the Mataura River 3.2 km (2.0 mi) downstream from the present town. In 1836 this village was the scene of the last act of Maori warfare in the South Island. A war party of approximately 70 members of the Ngāti Tama and Te Āti Awa tribes under the command of Te Pūoho-o-te-rangi, chief of the Ngāti Tama tribe and an ally and distant relative of Te Rauparaha attacked and occupied the village which was later retaken by the local Ngāi Tahu under the leadership of Hone Tūhawaiki (paramount chief of the Ngāi Tahu) and Te Matenga Taiaroa who had been at the Bluff when news of the war party's presence in the Southland came.

=== European settlement ===
In 1854 the Murihiku block of land (which included Mataura) was purchased from local Maori by the Otago Provincial Council, with the objective of developing it up for settlement by immigrants from Great Britain. At the time, travellers between Southland and Otago were drawn to the Mataura area by the presence of the Tuturau ford located about 3.2 km downstream of the falls and the northern ford which was located approximately 1.6 km (0.99 mi) above the falls. By 1856 the Otago Provincial Council had recognised that if development was to succeed a ferry had to be established at the falls to enable a direct overland transport between Dunedin and Invercargill. At the time the only alternative route was going by sea along the dangerous southern coast.

In 1859 the Otago Provincial Government built a wooden truss bridge which rested on a large rock in the middle of the falls and was suitable only for foot traffic with large animals and vehicles restricted to crossing on the ferry. As the bridge was always wet and slippery with spray from the falls, the face of the falls was removed by dynamite which moved the falls upstream. This work which damaged the look of the falls was in vain as the bridge was totally destroyed by a major flood on 22 April 1861. To encourage use of the bridge the council also built the Mataura Ferry Hotel on the west bank of the river. This was leased to John MacGibbon who with his family were the first inhabitants of the settlement and as part of his 7-year lease had the right to charge a toll on anyone crossing the river within a mile below and above the falls. At the time the only other Europeans living in the area were John Turnbull who owned the Tuturau Run and the Shanks family who owned the Marairua Run. The loss of the bridge meant that travellers reverted to using the ferry which had been established north of the falls. In 1866 James Pollack won the tender for the lease of the Mataura Ferry Hotel and offered to build a replacement bridge in return for the right to charge tolls for 12 years. His offer was declined by the Otago Provincial Government who built a replacement bridge of the suspension type, which was opened on 27 August 1868. Crossing the gorge downstream of the falls it was a more substantial timber structure with 16 supporting cables passing over stone pillars before being anchored in rock. A footbridge was added in 1898.

In response to the commencement on construction on the new bridge James Pollack built the Bridge Hotel on the east bank of the river by the bridge and sold the Mataura Ferry Hotel. He also petitioned the government to undertake the first survey of the location which subsequently named the area the Town of Mataura Bridge.

As a major mail coach stop on the route from Dunedin to Invercargill the bridge soon attracted a number of businessman who set up premises on the east bank around an area called Bridge Square. The construction of the telegraph line between Dunedin and Invercargill which passed through the town lead to the establishment in December 1868 of the first post and telegraph office in the Mataura Valley. This consolidated the settlement's position as a major transportation and communications hub. This in turn led to it attracting more businessmen, and becoming a major service centre. As a result of this growth a school was established in 1870. The moving of the former Mataura Ferry Hotel (by now renamed Cameron's Hotel) downstream to a location on the west bank where it was better able to service the passing traffic initiated development on the west bank which was assisted by the surveying of the west and north Mataura in 1874.

In 1875 a railway line was built from Gore to Mataura which in conjunction with establishment of the Mataura Paper Mill helped the town evolve and develop into the major industrial centre in Eastern Southland. The 1921 railway station has been listed NZHPT Category II since 1996. It is a standard class B station, of weatherboard and slate. In 2021 a feasibility study was started to consider moving the building to a new site.

=== Replacement of the bridge ===
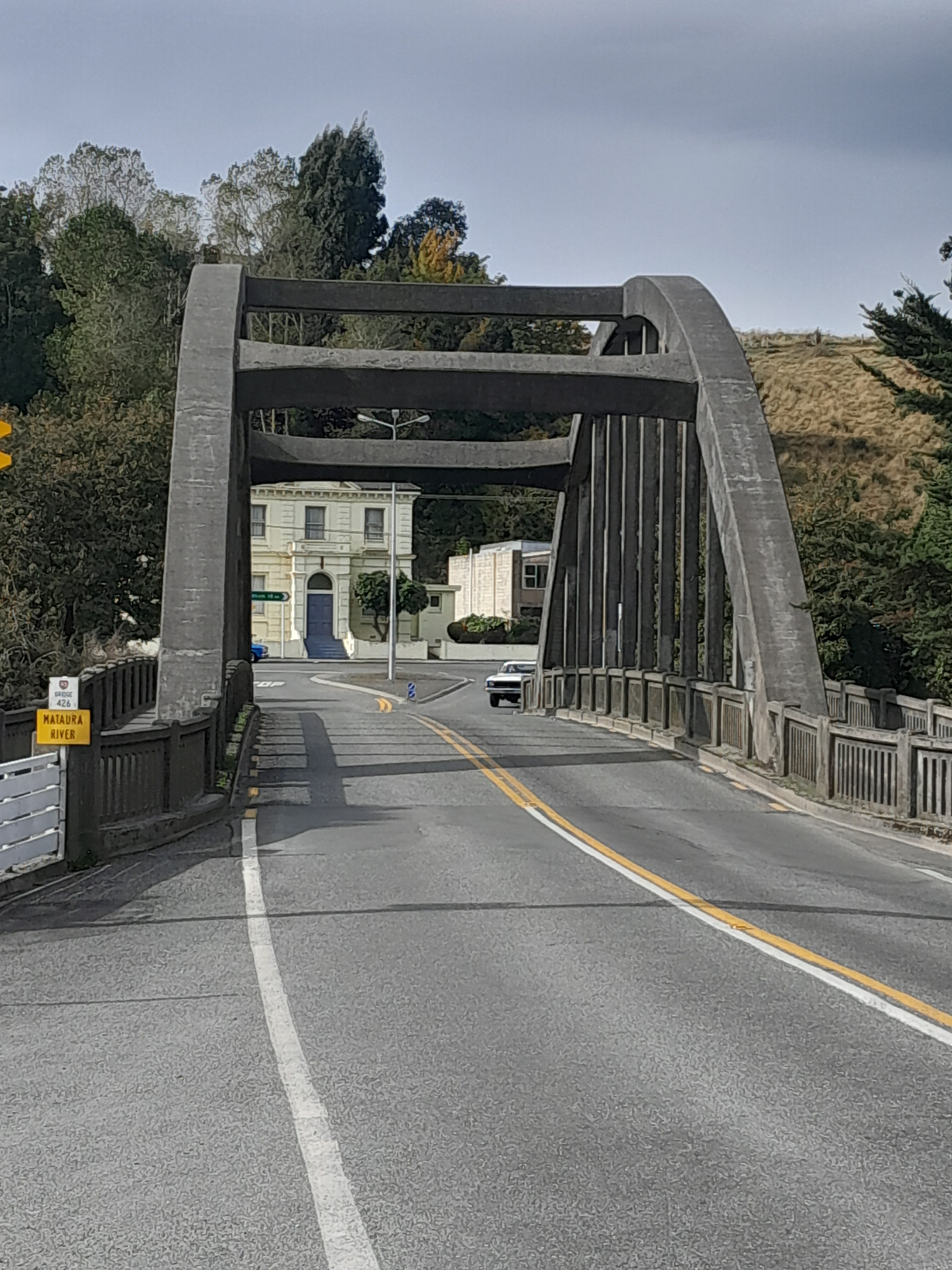
Mataura road bridge (2023)

By the 1930s the narrowness of the bridge which restricted travel to one direction at a time and its light construction had become inadequate for the increasing traffic and heavy loads. As a result, a new bridge was constructed by the Ministry of Works immediately upstream of the suspension bridge (which was subsequently demolished) and opened in July 1939 by Bob Semple, the Minister of Works. It was a single span bow-arch reinforced concrete 53.8 metres (176 ft 6 inches) in length.

=== Toxic waste ===
Aluminium dross from the Tiwai Point Aluminium Smelter was stored at the paper mill in Matuara from 2015 until 2021. It was moved into the disused paper mill without resource consent by a now defunct company. The 8000 tonnes of aluminium dross, also known as ouvea premix, if mixed with water would have released clouds of ammonia gas. The paper mill site could potentially be flooded by the Mataura river. There were concerns in August 2020 when firefighters had to put out a fire that came within 30 metres of the ouvea premix. The New Zealand government and New Zealand Aluminium Smelters shared the cost of removing this toxic waste, which was completed by July 2021.

=== Marae ===
Mataura Marae began being built in Mataura in the 1980s. Work resumed in 2017, including converting an old dairy factory into a wharekai (dining hall). The carvings on the wharenui (meeting house) were carried out by Te Puia in Rotorua.

In October 2020, the Government committed $294,009 from the Provincial Growth Fund towards funding the marae development trust, creating 17 jobs.

== Demographics ==
Mataura covers 5.32 km^{2} (2.05 sq mi) and had an estimated population of 1,670 as of June 2025, with a population density of 314 people per km^{2}.

Historical population
Year	Pop.	±% p.a.
2006	1,560	—
2013	1,509	−0.47%
2018	1,629	+1.54%

Mataura had a population of 1,629 at the 2018 New Zealand census, an increase of 120 people (8.0%) since the 2013 census, and an increase of 69 people (4.4%) since the 2006 census. There were 660 households, comprising 813 males and 816 females, giving a sex ratio of 1.0 males per female. The median age was 39.6 years (compared with 37.4 years nationally), with 348 people (21.4%) aged under 15 years, 300 (18.4%) aged 15 to 29, 723 (44.4%) aged 30 to 64, and 258 (15.8%) aged 65 or older.

Ethnicities were 75.5% European/Pākehā, 31.5% Māori, 2.8% Pasifika, 2.2% Asian, and 1.3% other ethnicities. People may identify with more than one ethnicity.

The percentage of people born overseas was 6.1, compared with 27.1% nationally.

Although some people chose not to answer the census's question about religious affiliation, 56.4% had no religion, 32.4% were Christian, 2.0% had Māori religious beliefs, 0.7% were Muslim and 1.3% had other religions.

Of those at least 15 years old, 51 (4.0%) people had a bachelor's or higher degree, and 465 (36.3%) people had no formal qualifications. The median income was $26,600, compared with $31,800 nationally. 81 people (6.3%) earned over $70,000 compared to 17.2% nationally. The employment status of those at least 15 was that 648 (50.6%) people were employed full-time, 159 (12.4%) were part-time, and 54 (4.2%) were unemployed.

== Local government ==
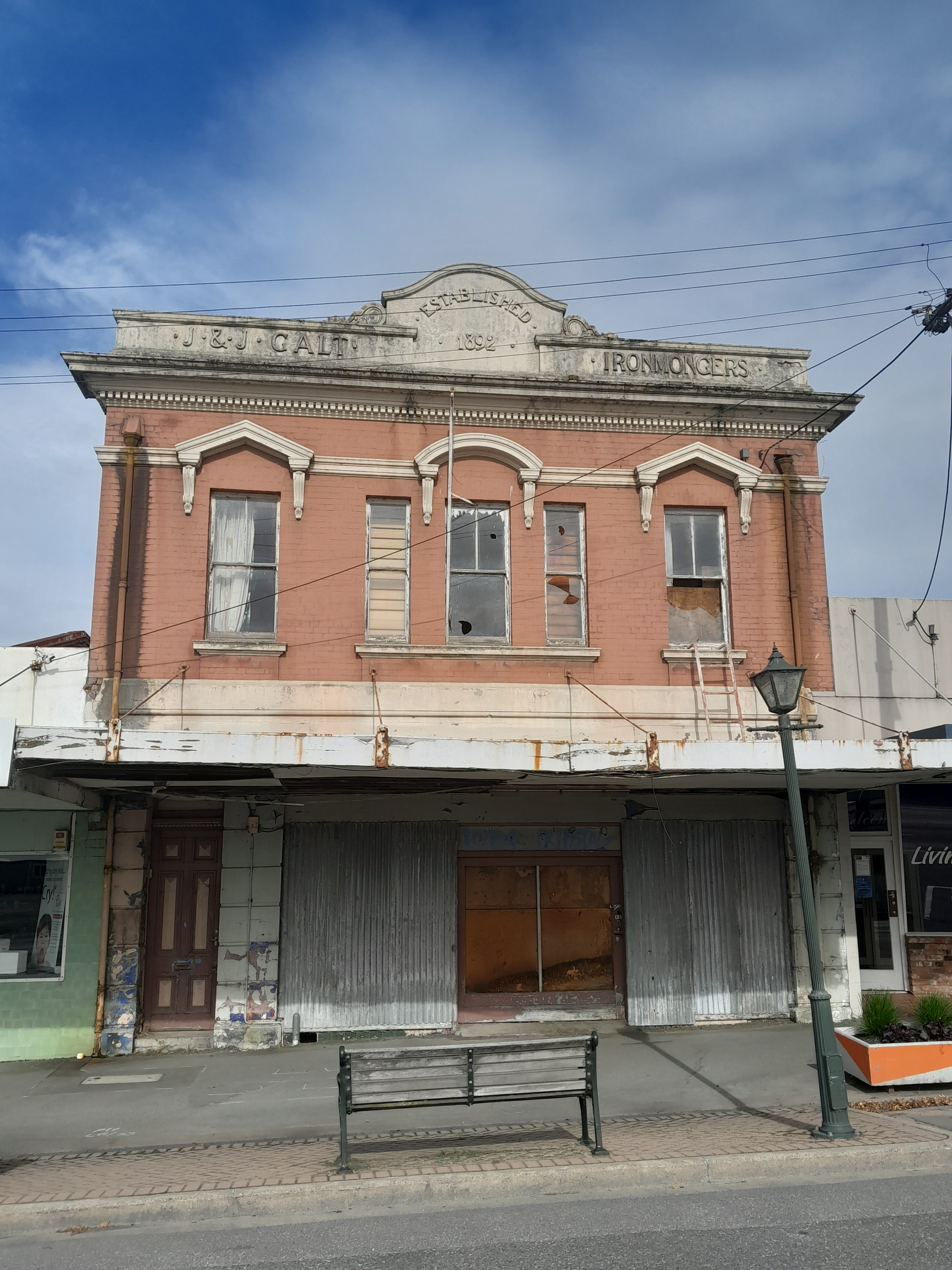
J & J Galt ironmongers building (Established 1892)

Prior to 1882 local government had been undertaken first by the Tutarau Wardens and then by the Tutarau Road Board. On 29 March 1892 a newly established Town Board took over local government administration of the town's affairs and representation of the town's 70 ratepayers. The town's affairs remained under the administration of the Town Board until 1895 when it changed to the Mataura Borough Council. In 1989 the Mataura Borough Council was merged into the Gore District Council.

=== Mayors ===
- Thomas Culling – 1895 to 1897. Prior to becoming the borough's first mayor he had been chairman of the town board.
- Hugh Cameron
- Thomas MacGibbon
- John Lowden – 1903 to 1906
- John Galt – 1906 to 1909
- Andrew Balneaves – 1909 to 1912
- Forrest William Brown – 1915 to 1917
- Charles Donohue McConnell – 1919 to 1935, 1938 to 1950
- John Buchanan – 1935 to 1938
- James William Ingram – 1950 to 1959
- Malcolm Tulloch – 1959 to 1962
- S.I.L (Logie) McKelvie – 1962 to 1970
- Keith Raymond Henderson – 1970 to 1982
- Ian Tulloch – 1982 to 1989. The last mayor of the town before it became part of the Gore District Council

== Education ==
Mataura School serves years 1 to 6 with a roll of 55 as of July 2026. It opened in 1878.

Children of intermediate and secondary school age are bussed to Gore to continue their education there.

== Facilities ==
The town's swimming pool opened in 1956 and closed in 2017.

== Electricity supply ==
Because it had surplus generation capacity, the freezing works had been supplying electricity to the nearby town of Gore since 1905. Meanwhile, due to the town's financial situation, Mataura residents were still using candles and kerosene powered lamps. It wasn't until 1911 the Borough Council was able to reach agreement with the freezing works for them to increase their generating capacity so that they could supply the Mataura load. After taking out a loan to finance the expansion of the generation capacity and the installation of a distribution system around the town the first power began being supplied from 5 October 1912. Mataura retained its own independent power system until 1932 when due to technical issues it became impossible for the freezing works to continue supplying the town. As a result, the borough council accepted an offer to sell their power system to the Southland Electric Power Board, which took over responsibility for supplying the town from its distribution network.

== Industry ==
=== Mataura Dairy Factory ===
In January 1887 a company was formed to construct and operate a dairy factory. After procuring land a factory was constructed and up and running by November of that year. Water for use in the milk and cheese making processes was obtained from a private spring while power was provide by a steam engine powered by local lignite. It was not until 1917 that the factory converted to electric power from the local distribution network. By the early 1970s the company was in financial trouble and closed in May 1980, when dairy processing in the area was concentrated at the Edendale Dairy Factory.

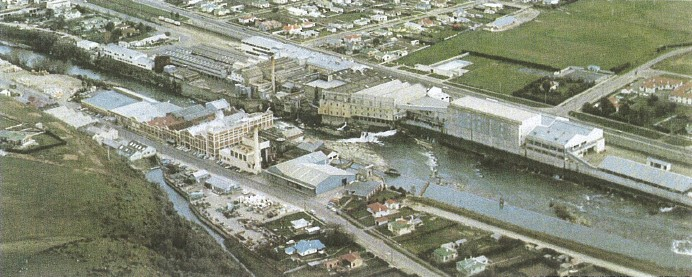
Mataura's large paper mill in 1982, a former cornerstone of the local industry.

=== Mataura Paper Mill ===
In the mid-1870s a company led by James Bain was formed in Invercargill to establish a pulp and paper mill on the east bank of the river downstream of the Mataura falls. To assist them the Government granted the company freehold of land on both sides of the river at the falls, as well as all water rights, which would allow the head to be utilised to provide cheap power to the paper making machinery. The company however installed obsolete second hand machinery, which lead to the mill being unprofitable.

In 1884 it was sold to the partners of Dunedin-based Coulls Culling and Co. and Thomas S. Culling, who was senior partner in the Dunedin-based business of R. Wilson and Co. Under the direction of Thomas Culling, the company had by 1888 installed new paper making machinery as well as two hydro generators one of 50 Hp and the other of 250 hp. In 1891 the paper mill and the freezing works jointly built a weir to a race to improve the water supply to their respective hydro generators. In 1892 the mills became profitable, and by 1895 the paper mill was employing 54 staff. Thomas Culling eventually purchased the interests of four of the partners leaving him owner in partnership with J. L. Gregory. In late 1904 as a means of ending an unprofitable price war between Mataura Falls Paper Mill, Otago Paper Mills at Woodhaugh near Dunedin and Riverhead Paper Mills at Auckland these companies amalgamated into a new company called the New Zealand Paper Mills.

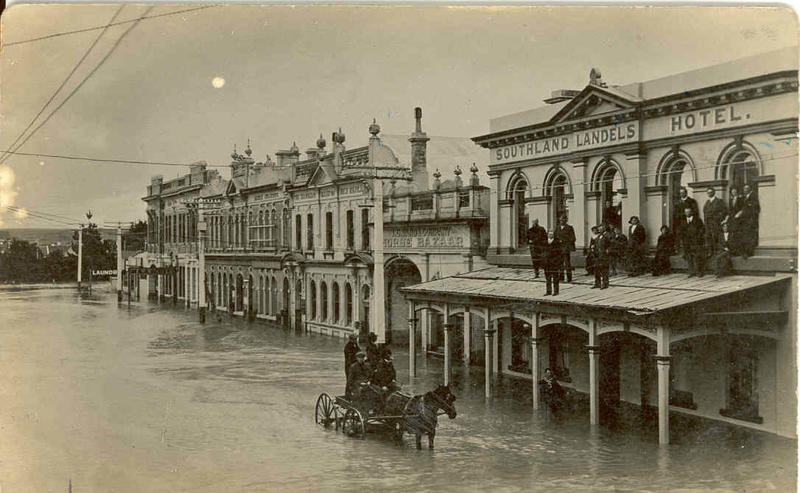
The aftermath of the 1913 major flood

By 1905 the mill had three bag-making machines, and two machines for printing the bags. In 1913 the mill was badly damaged by a major flood, which took a month to repair. In 1923 a second paper making machine designated No.3 was transferred from the Riverhead mill (which was subsequently closed) to join the No.2 machine, which up till then had been the only machine at the mill. At the same time a new machine designated the No.4 was installed.

In 1936 a new paper making machine designated the No.5 machine was installed.

In 1960 Fletchers Ltd bought an interest in the company. As a result of their injection of new capital the mill was completely modernised. In 1964 NZ Forest Products took a 30% share in the company with Fletchers having 30%. On 8 July 1970 NZ Forest Products took complete ownership of New Zealand Paper Mills. In 1976 the mill celebrated its centennial year.

By 1990 the mill, owned by NZ Forest Products, had become a division of Elder Resources, until it was taken over by Carter Holt Harvey in 1991. Between 1984 and 1991, due to upgrades and efficiency gains, productively had increased by 25% with 216 staff employed at the end of the period. Employees had increased by 1993 to 230 people, of which twenty were women. A four shift system was being used, which operated every day except for two days during the Christmas holiday period. The shifts were eight hour long with shift workers working six days on and two days off. By 1997 the mill was producing approximately 25,000 tonnes of paper products per year. The mill's equipment was powered by a combination of onsite hydro power, steam boilers powered by local coal and supply from the local grid.

By the late 20th century the mill was coming under intense pressure from Asian competitors which had depressed the world price for paper, and as a result the mill was losing NZ$1 million a year. Faced with these losses and forecasts that they would continue, and with the mill contributing only 3% of Carter Harvey Holt output by volume, the company closed the mill on 18 August 2000 with 155 staff being made redundant.

=== Mataura Flour Mill ===
As a result of concerns expressed by local citizens about the proposed new paper mill's proposal to secure sole rights to harnessing all the electrical potential of the falls, the paper mill's proprietors obtained the goodwill of the citizens by building a flour mill on the west bank. The three grinding stones in the mill were driven by a water wheel. The flour mill was demolished in 1893 to make room for the freezing works.

=== Mataura Freezing Works ===
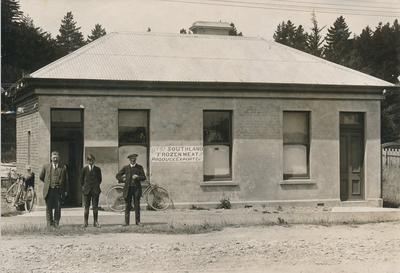
The Southland Frozen Meat And Produce Export Company office

The Southland Frozen Meat And Produce Export Company (which had been established in 1882) purchased land on the west bank of the river from Thomas Culling (the principal of the Mataura Paper Mills) upon which they built and opened the second freezing (meat processing) works in Southland. At the time eastern Southland sheep farmers tended to send their livestock by rail to Dunedin for slaughtering and it was intended that the new works would compete for their business.

The plant opened on 21 April 1893, with freezing starting 4 days later. The complex's machinery was powered by electricity from a hydro generator powered by water diverted from the falls. A steam engine provided backup power.

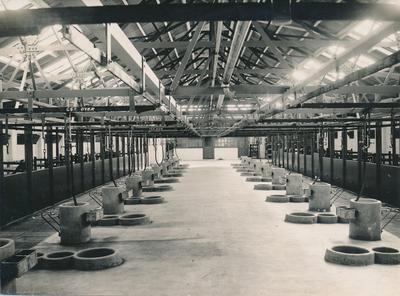
Interior chamber

By early May production had increased to 300 carcasses a day. The complex at the time of its opening featured 3 freezing chambers, each capable of holding 600 carcasses. The storerooms could accommodate 16,000 carcasses, which by 1897 had been increased to 24,000 carcasses. By 1905 40 to 50 people were being employed at the works.

In 1931 a new slaughter board was installed in the complex.

In the 1947 to 1948 season the slaughterhouse changed over from solo butchering to the chain system of slaughtering livestock. Whereas previously one man took responsibility for butchering an animal from start to finish, with the chain system one man was limited to undertaking one task. Compared with the previous system where the workers were permanent residents of the town the chain system lead to increasing numbers of seasonal workers who lived in the town only during the killing season.

In 1982 a methane plant was installed which allowed the complex to supply more of its power demand.

After a series of takeovers the Mataura works came under the ownership of Alliance Group Limited in 1989. The works currently undertakes the processing of lamb, sheep, cattle and bobby calves.

Due to intensive development and expansion throughout its history, the plant extends for some distance along the bank of the river, sandwiched between it and State Highway 1.

=== Fibreboard manufacturing ===
In 1997 Rayonier NZ limited opened on a greenfield site a medium-density fibreboard (MDF) manufacturing plant at Brydone, 8 kilometres south of Mataura. The facility was subsequently purchased by Dongwha in 2005. Renamed as the Patinna mill it specializes in thin and high density fibreboard products with 90% of its output exported. The mill was acquired by Japanese company Daiken in 2018.

== Notable people ==
- Justin Marshall – rugby union player and commentator
- Jimmy Cowan – rugby union player
- Lois Muir – netball and basketball player, and netball coach

== Cardigan Bay ==
Mataura is the birthplace of Cardigan Bay, the famous New Zealand pacer. Cardigan Bay was the first standardbred to win $1,000,000 in North America.
