= Hokonui Hills =

Range of hills in Southland, New Zealand

Coordinates: 45.9502°S 168.6237°E

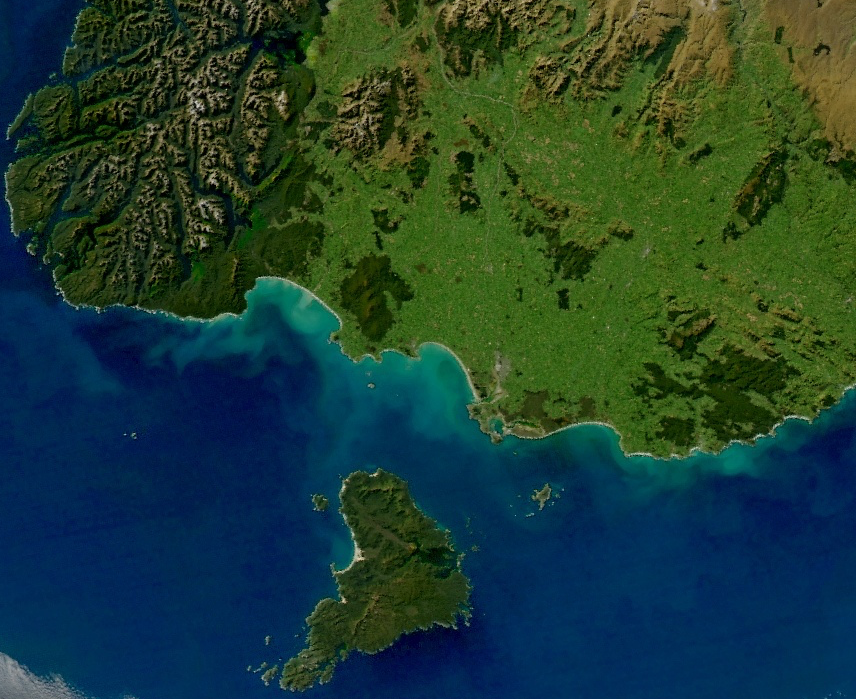
Satellite image of the southern part of the Southland Region. The Hokonui Hills are the dark area to the right of centre in the upper part of the image. The diagonal line of the Southland Syncline can clearly be seen stretching from them to the coast.

The Hokonui Hills, also known as The Hokonui Mountains or simply The Hokonui, are a range of hills in central Southland, New Zealand. They rise to 600 metres above the surrounding Southland Plains, of which the hills mark a northern extremity.

The Hokonui forms part of the Southland Syncline, a geological fold system which extends northwestward from the coast at The Catlins. Owing to the transform fault which forms the Southern Alps, the westernmost part of the syncline has been transported several hundred kilometres to the north; this western section includes many of the hills within the Kahurangi National Park in the northwest of the South Island.

The Hokonui Hills also splits the Southland Plains in two - to the north and east lies the broad floodplain of the Mataura River, and to the south and west lie the plains of the Aparima and Ōreti Rivers. The Ōreti's major tributary, the Makarewa River, rises in the south of the Hokonui Hills.

The hills lie within a triangle formed by the towns of Gore to the east, Lumsden to the north, and Winton to the southwest, and cover approximately 1,200 km².

== Hokonui moonshine ==
During the nineteenth century, the region gained a reputation for the production of illicit alcohol known as Hokonui moonshine. The association between the region and illicit alcohol lasted until the 1930s and has passed into New Zealand folklore. The Hokonui Moonshiner Museum in Gore celebrates the "colourful history of illicit whiskey making and consumption".
