= Makarewa River =

River in Southland, New Zealand

Coordinates: 46°22′S 168°16′E

The Makarewa River is the largest tributary of the Ōreti River, and is in Southland, New Zealand. It flows for 60 kilometres (37 mi) from its source in the Hokonui Hills, joining the Ōreti just north of Invercargill. The river lies within the Makarewa Groundwater Management Zone which covers an area of approximately 66,000 ha. Makarewa River is a location for the fishing of brown trout.
