= Mayor of Southland District =

Elected political office in New Zealand

Mayor of Southland
- Coat of arms of the Southland District
- Incumbent; Rob Scott since 2022
- Style: His Worship
- Term length: Three years, renewable
- Inaugural holder: John Casey
- Formation: 1989
- Deputy: Christine Menzies
- Salary: $134,914
- Website: Official website

The mayor of Southland officiates over the Southland District Council. The mayor is directly elected using the first-past-the-post electoral system. The current mayor is Rob Scott, who was elected in 2022.

== History ==
Southland District was established as part of the 1989 local government amalgamation. Frana Cardno joined the Southland District as a councillor in 1989, before being elected mayor in 1992. She retired from that role in October 2013 prior to that year's local elections, and was New Zealand's longest-serving female mayor ever.

== List of office holders ==
Southland District has had four mayors:

	Name	Portrait	Term
1	John Casey		1989–1992
2	Frana Cardno		1992–2013
3	Gary Tong		2013–2022
4	Rob Scott		2022–present
