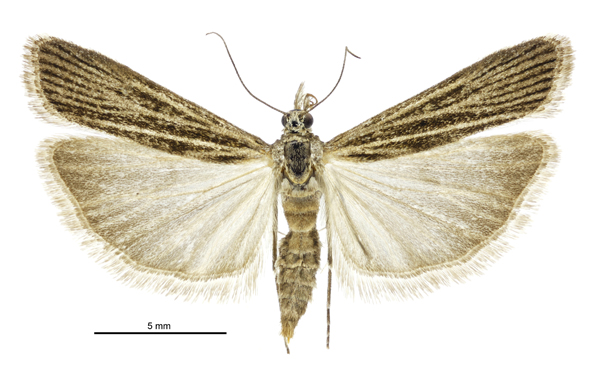
- Female
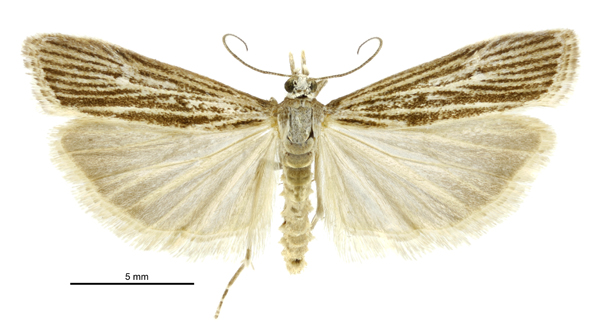
- Male

Scientific classification
- Kingdom: Animalia
- Phylum: Arthropoda
- Clade: Pancrustacea
- Class: Insecta
- Order: Lepidoptera
- Family: Crambidae
- Genus: Eudonia
- Species: E. atmogramma

Binomial name
- Eudonia atmogramma (Meyrick, 1915)

Synonyms
- Scoparia atmogramma Meyrick, 1915

= Eudonia atmogramma =

Species of moth endemic to New Zealand

Eudonia atmogramma is a moth in the family Crambidae. It was described by Edward Meyrick in 1915. It is endemic to New Zealand and has been observed in the South Island and on Stewart Island. Adults have been observed on the wing every month of the year except July. They are attracted to light.

== Taxonomy ==
This species was first described by Edward Meyrick in 1915 using specimens collected by Alfred Philpott at Tisbury and West Plains near Invercargill in September and by George Hudson at Lake Wakatipu. Meyrick originally named this species Scoparia atmogramma. In 1928 George Hudson, in his book The butterflies and moths of New Zealand, illustrated and discussed this species under that name. In 1988 John S. Dugdale placed this species in the genus Eudonia. The lectotype specimen collected in Invercargill is held at the Natural History Museum, London.

== Description ==
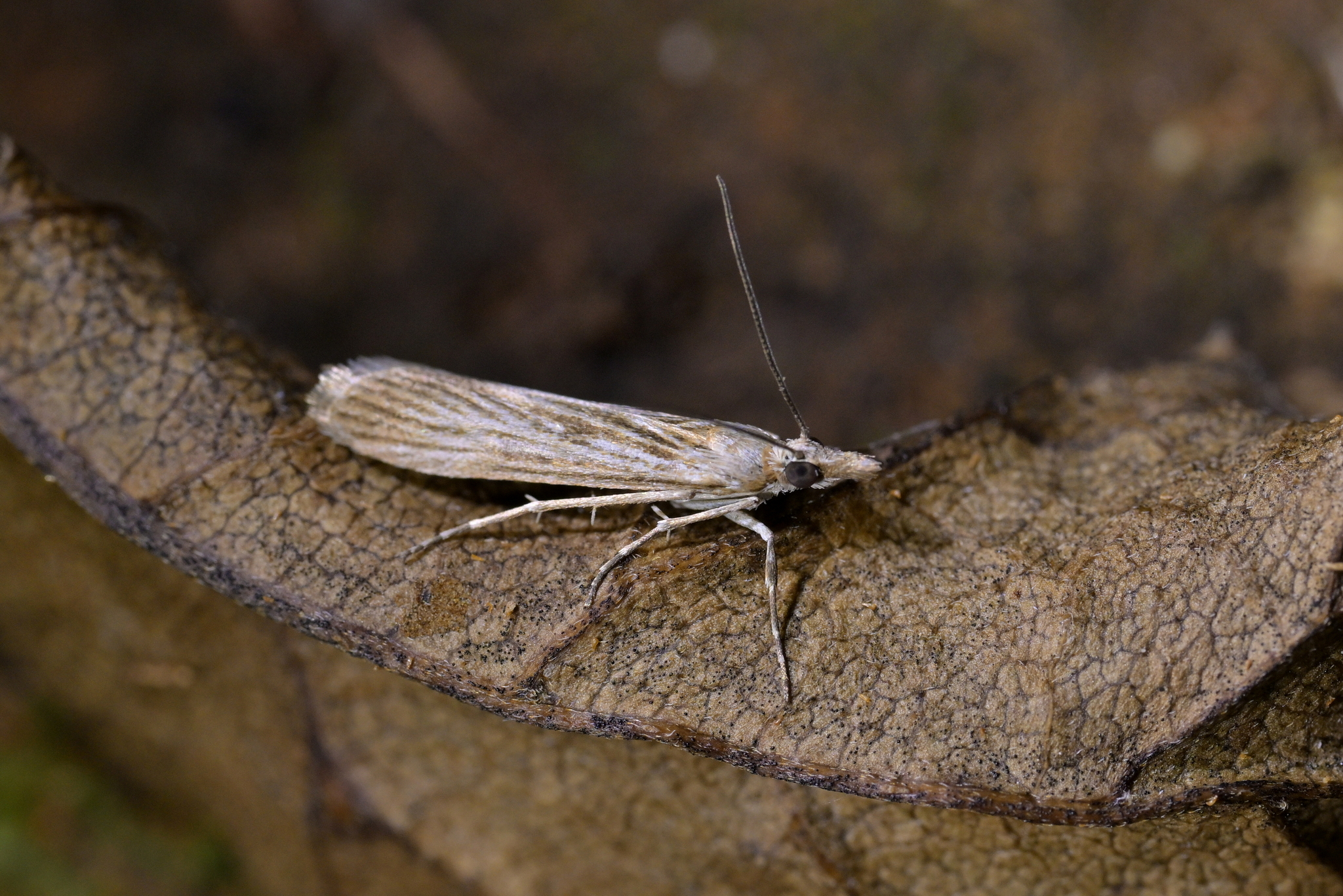
E. atmogramma.

Meyrick described the species as follows:

♂. 23-24 mm. Head and thorax light grey more or less mixed with whitish. Palpi 3, light grey, white towards base beneath. Antennal ciliations 2/3. Abdomen pale greyish-ochreous. Forewings elongate, very narrow towards base, gradually dilated posteriorly, apex obtuse, termen slightly rounded, rather oblique; ochreous-grey, usually more or less suffused with whitish on veins, interneural spaces more or less suffusedly sprinkled with dark fuscous; claviform indicated by a small spot of dark-fuscous suffusion : cilia white, with a grey line. Hindwings 1 1/4 without long hairs in cell; light grey, paler towards base : cilia white or in one specimen whitish-ochreous, with faint grey line.

This species is similar in appearance to forms of Eudonia paltomacha. It is also possible to confuse this species with a form of Eudonia leptalea.

== Distribution ==
This species is endemic to New Zealand and has been observed on the South Island as well as on Stewart Island.

== Habitat ==
This species has been observed in a variety of habitats including saline wetlands, salt pan habitat, and granite sand plains.

== Behaviour ==
Adults have been recorded on wing most months of the year except July. They are most frequently observed from September to December. The adult moths are attracted to light and have been collected via a mercury vapour light trap.
