= Rosedale, Invercargill =

Rosedale
- Suburb
- Interactive map of Rosedale
- Coordinates: 46.3892°S 168.3700°E
- Country: New Zealand
- City: Invercargill
- Local authority: Invercargill City Council

Area
  - Land: 109 ha (270 acres)

Population (June 2022)
  - Total: 1,920
  - Density: 1,760/km^{2} (4,560/sq mi)

| Grasmere | Waihopai | Myross Bush |
| Gladstone | Rosedale | Hargest |
| Avenal | Windsor | Waverley |

Rosedale is a suburb of New Zealand's southernmost city, Invercargill.

== Demographics ==
Rosedale covers 1.09 km^{2} (0.42 sq mi) and had an estimated population of 1,920 as of June 2022, with a population density of 1,761 people per km^{2}.

Historical population
| Year | Pop. | ±% p.a. |
|---|---|---|
| 2006 | 1,866 | — |
| 2013 | 1,833 | −0.25% |
| 2018 | 1,872 | +0.42% |

had a population of 1,872 at the 2018 New Zealand census, an increase of 39 people (2.1%) since the 2013 census, and an increase of 6 people (0.3%) since the 2006 census. There were 753 households, comprising 864 males and 1,005 females, giving a sex ratio of 0.86 males per female. The median age was 45.6 years (compared with 37.4 years nationally), with 363 people (19.4%) aged under 15 years, 249 (13.3%) aged 15 to 29, 906 (48.4%) aged 30 to 64, and 354 (18.9%) aged 65 or older.

Ethnicities were 90.5% European/Pākehā, 9.0% Māori, 1.8% Pasifika, 6.6% Asian, and 1.3% other ethnicities. People may identify with more than one ethnicity.

The percentage of people born overseas was 12.2, compared with 27.1% nationally.

Although some people chose not to answer the census's question about religious affiliation, 44.1% had no religion, 49.0% were Christian, 0.3% had Māori religious beliefs, 0.8% were Hindu, 0.5% were Muslim, 0.3% were Buddhist and 0.6% had other religions.

Of those at least 15 years old, 408 (27.0%) people had a bachelor's or higher degree, and 252 (16.7%) people had no formal qualifications. The median income was $42,600, compared with $31,800 nationally. 432 people (28.6%) earned over $70,000 compared to 17.2% nationally. The employment status of those at least 15 was that 834 (55.3%) people were employed full-time, 213 (14.1%) were part-time, and 30 (2.0%) were unemployed.

== Education ==
James Hargest Junior Campus is in Rosedale providing education for years 7 and 8. It was Rosedale Intermediate School until a 2004 consolidation of schools, when it was combined with Collingwood Intermediate School as part of James Hargest College.
