= Gladstone, Invercargill =

Gladstone
- Suburb
- Interactive map of Gladstone
- Coordinates: 46.394°S 168.347°E
- Country: New Zealand
- City: Invercargill
- Local authority: Invercargill City Council

Area
  - Land: 127 ha (310 acres)

Population (June 2025)
  - Total: 2,470
  - Density: 1,940/km^{2} (5,040/sq mi)

Grasmere	Prestonville
	Gladstone	Rosedale
Invercargill Central	Avenal	Windsor

Gladstone is a suburb of New Zealand's southernmost city, Invercargill.

The area is low-lying and at risk from flooding and sea level rise.

== History ==
The suburb was targeted during a six week burglary spree in December 2019 and January 2020.

In July 2020, a member of the public was injured during the aggravated robbery of a Gladstone convenience store. Two men were charged over the incident the following month.

In September 2020, the Southland Times reported high demand for land and housing in Gladstone. However, in November 2020, Quotable Values released statistics showing house values were increasing at a slower rate than the rest of Invercargill.

== Demographics ==
Gladstone covers 1.27 km^{2} (0.49 sq mi) and had an estimated population of 2,470 as of June 2025, with a population density of 1,945 people per km^{2}.

Historical population
Year	Pop.	±% p.a.
2006	2,484	—
2013	2,385	−0.58%
2018	2,376	−0.08%

Gladstone had a population of 2,376 at the 2018 New Zealand census, a decrease of 9 people (−0.4%) since the 2013 census, and a decrease of 108 people (−4.3%) since the 2006 census. There were 942 households, comprising 1,152 males and 1,224 females, giving a sex ratio of 0.94 males per female. The median age was 44.4 years (compared with 37.4 years nationally), with 420 people (17.7%) aged under 15 years, 414 (17.4%) aged 15 to 29, 1,200 (50.5%) aged 30 to 64, and 339 (14.3%) aged 65 or older.

Ethnicities were 89.0% European/Pākehā, 9.8% Māori, 1.8% Pasifika, 6.1% Asian, and 2.0% other ethnicities. People may identify with more than one ethnicity.

The percentage of people born overseas was 15.3, compared with 27.1% nationally.

Although some people chose not to answer the census's question about religious affiliation, 46.3% had no religion, 44.2% were Christian, 0.1% had Māori religious beliefs, 0.5% were Hindu, 0.3% were Muslim, 0.9% were Buddhist and 1.1% had other religions.

Of those at least 15 years old, 543 (27.8%) people had a bachelor's or higher degree, and 291 (14.9%) people had no formal qualifications. The median income was $39,900, compared with $31,800 nationally. 483 people (24.7%) earned over $70,000 compared to 17.2% nationally. The employment status of those at least 15 was that 1,080 (55.2%) people were employed full-time, 357 (18.3%) were part-time, and 54 (2.8%) were unemployed.

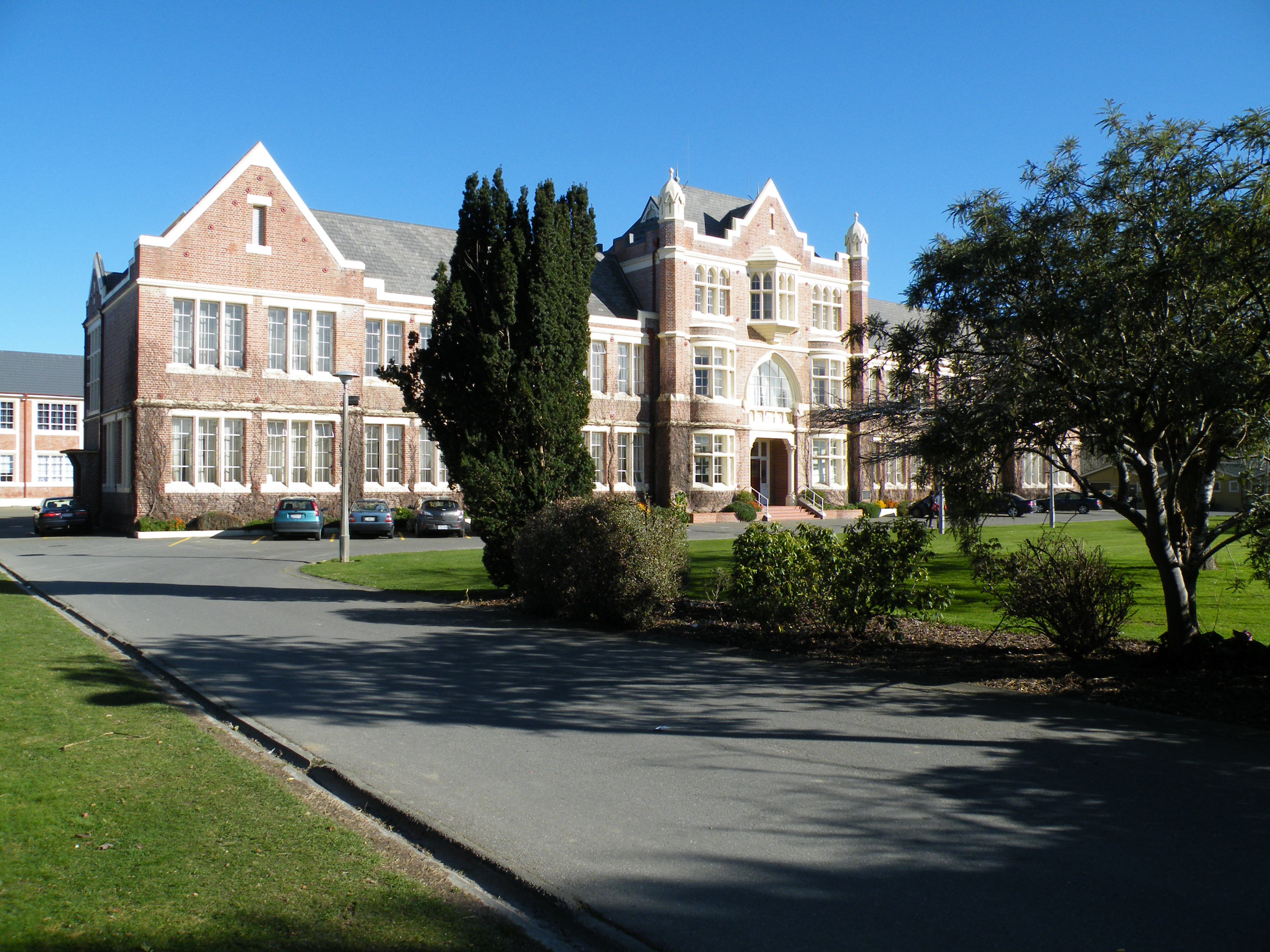
Southland Boys' High School central block

== Education ==
Southland Boys' High School is a single-sex state secondary school for years 7 to 13 with a roll of 1,115 students as of March 2026. The school first opened in 1881 and moved to its current site in 1926.

Waihopai School is a state primary school for years 1 to 6 with a roll of 319 students. The school opened in 1914 as Queen's Park School and adopted its current name one year later. It was formed by the merger of Invercargill Park School and Gladstone (Waihopai) School.
