= Waikiwi =

- Suburb
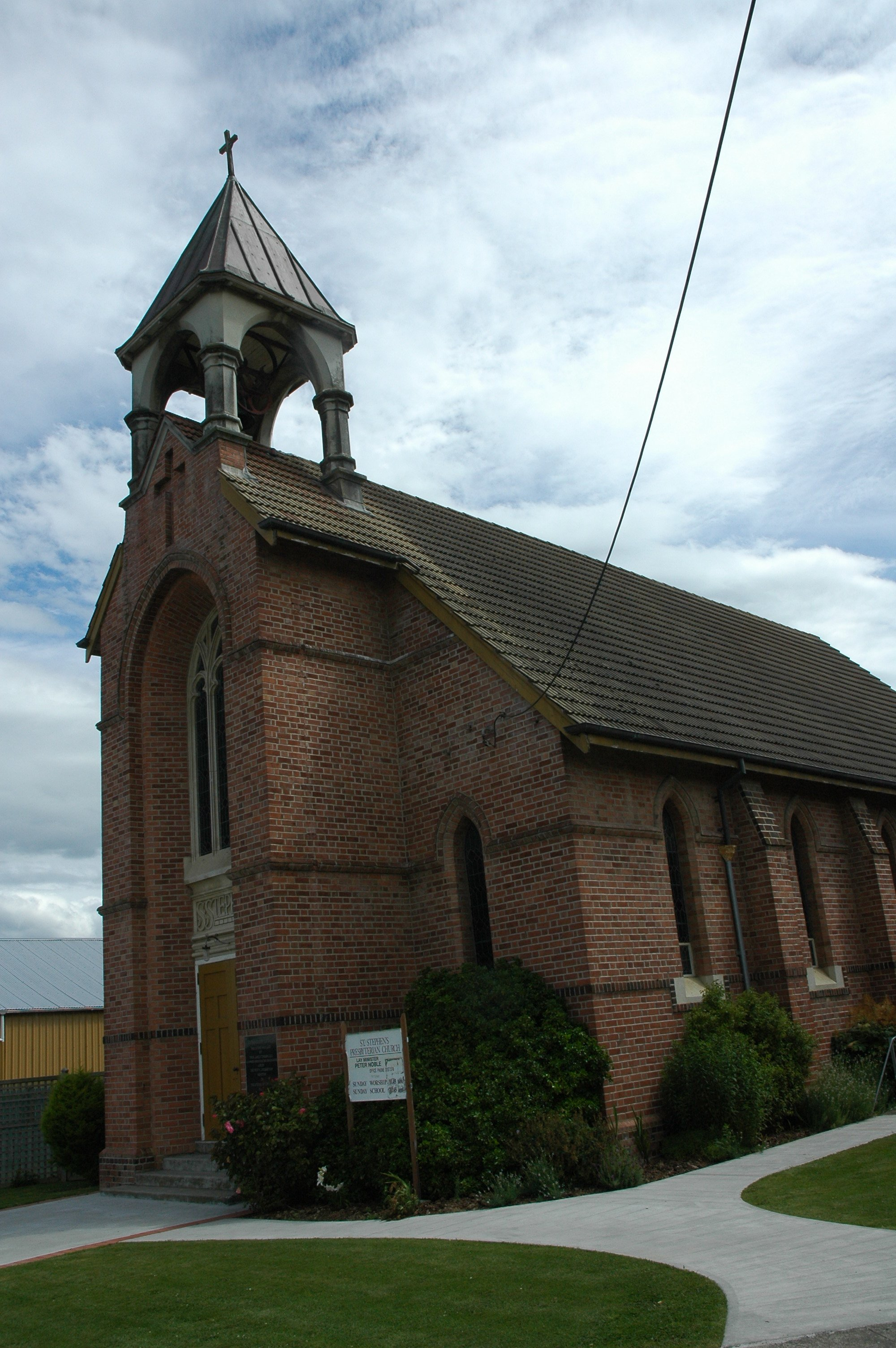
- St Stephen's Presbyterian Church
- Interactive map of Waikiwi
- Coordinates: 46.376°S 168.350°E
- Country: New Zealand
- City: Invercargill City

Area
  - Land: 530 ha (1,300 acres)

Population (June 2025)
  - Total: 3,710
  - Density: 700/km^{2} (1,800/sq mi)

rural	Lorneville	rural
West Plains	Waikiwi	Myross Bush
Grasmere	Gladstone	Rosedale

Waikiwi is a northern suburb of Invercargill, Southland, New Zealand. Invercargill is the southernmost city of New Zealand.

The New Zealand Ministry for Culture and Heritage gives a translation of "kiwi waters" for Waikiwi.

Waikiwi lies on the northern edge of Invercargill. It is bounded on the west by the Ohai Industrial Line and on the south by the Waihopai River. There is farmland to the north and east, although the suburb is expanding to the north.

Prestonville, a commercial and industrial area, is located south-west of Waikiwi.

Thomsons Bush, a reserve, is located south-east of the settlement.

St John's Cemetery is located in Waikiwi. It is the resting place of many notable Invercargill residents.

== History ==
In 1984, there was a major flood in Grasmere and neighbouring suburbs. It caused extensive property damage, and some people lost their jobs or became homeless. Flood banks were installed to prevent further floods.

== Demographics ==
Waikiwi covers 5.30 km^{2} (2.05 sq mi) and had an estimated population of 3,710 as of June 2025, with a population density of 700 people per km^{2}.

Historical population for Donovan Park
Year	Pop.	±% p.a.
2006	2,058	—
2013	2,355	+1.94%
2018	2,484	+1.07%

Before the 2023 census, Waikiwi was mostly part of the Donovan Park statistical area, which covered 2.93 km^{2} (1.13 sq mi). Donovan Park had a population of 2,484 at the 2018 New Zealand census, an increase of 129 people (5.5%) since the 2013 census, and an increase of 426 people (20.7%) since the 2006 census. There were 987 households, comprising 1,128 males and 1,356 females, giving a sex ratio of 0.83 males per female. The median age was 51.8 years (compared with 37.4 years nationally), with 375 people (15.1%) aged under 15 years, 330 (13.3%) aged 15 to 29, 906 (36.5%) aged 30 to 64, and 870 (35.0%) aged 65 or older.

Ethnicities were 90.6% European/Pākehā, 9.7% Māori, 2.3% Pasifika, 4.2% Asian, and 2.3% other ethnicities. People may identify with more than one ethnicity.

The percentage of people born overseas was 10.4, compared with 27.1% nationally.

Although some people chose not to answer the census's question about religious affiliation, 39.6% had no religion, 51.2% were Christian, 0.1% had Māori religious beliefs, 0.7% were Hindu, 0.7% were Muslim, 0.2% were Buddhist and 0.7% had other religions.

Of those at least 15 years old, 312 (14.8%) people had a bachelor's or higher degree, and 621 (29.4%) people had no formal qualifications. The median income was $29,200, compared with $31,800 nationally. 360 people (17.1%) earned over $70,000 compared to 17.2% nationally. The employment status of those at least 15 was that 897 (42.5%) people were employed full-time, 270 (12.8%) were part-time, and 36 (1.7%) were unemployed.

== Education ==
Southland Adventist Christian School is a state-integrated co-educational full primary school for years 1–8. It has a roll of 116 students as of March 2026.. The school was established in Invercargill Central in 1955 and moved to Waikiwi in 1968. It moved to its current site in Waikiwi in 2021.

Sacred Heart School is a Catholic state-integrated co=educational contributing primary school for years 1 to 6 with a roll of 80 students as of March 2026.. The school opened in 1962.

Ruru Special School, a co-educational school for people with learning support needs, was established in 1967.

Waikiwi School was a state primary school established in 1872. It was merged to Grasmere School in January 2005.
