= Hargest, New Zealand =

Hargest
- Suburb
- Interactive map of Hargest
- Coordinates: 46.388°S 168.377°E
- Country: New Zealand
- City: Invercargill
- Local authority: Invercargill City Council

Area
  - Land: 103 ha (250 acres)

Population (June 2022)
  - Total: 2,190
  - Density: 2,130/km^{2} (5,510/sq mi)

Waikiwi	Waihopai	Myross Bush
Rosedale	Hargest
Windsor	Waverley	Ascot

Hargest is a suburb of New Zealand's southernmost city, Invercargill.

== Demographics ==
Hargest covers 1.03 km^{2} (0.40 sq mi) and had an estimated population of 2,190 as of June 2022, with a population density of 2,126 people per km^{2}.

Historical population
Year	Pop.	±% p.a.
2006	2,019	—
2013	1,995	−0.17%
2018	2,070	+0.74%

Hargest had a population of 2,070 at the 2018 New Zealand census, an increase of 75 people (3.8%) since the 2013 census, and an increase of 51 people (2.5%) since the 2006 census. There were 798 households, comprising 1,002 males and 1,068 females, giving a sex ratio of 0.94 males per female. The median age was 36.9 years (compared with 37.4 years nationally), with 447 people (21.6%) aged under 15 years, 408 (19.7%) aged 15 to 29, 948 (45.8%) aged 30 to 64, and 270 (13.0%) aged 65 or older.

Ethnicities were 88.7% European/Pākehā, 10.4% Māori, 2.3% Pasifika, 5.7% Asian, and 3.5% other ethnicities. People may identify with more than one ethnicity.

The percentage of people born overseas was 13.5, compared with 27.1% nationally.

Although some people chose not to answer the census's question about religious affiliation, 49.9% had no religion, 40.3% were Christian, 0.1% had Māori religious beliefs, 0.3% were Hindu, 0.3% were Muslim, 1.2% were Buddhist and 1.3% had other religions.

Of those at least 15 years old, 387 (23.8%) people had a bachelor's or higher degree, and 267 (16.5%) people had no formal qualifications. The median income was $37,800, compared with $31,800 nationally. 309 people (19.0%) earned over $70,000 compared to 17.2% nationally. The employment status of those at least 15 was that 927 (57.1%) people were employed full-time, 243 (15.0%) were part-time, and 45 (2.8%) were unemployed.

== Education ==
James Hargest College Senior campus is in Hargest and provides education for years 9 to 13. The college, which also has a junior campus in Rosedale for years 7 to 8, is a state secondary school with a roll of 1,902 students across both campuses as of March 2026. It opened in 1958 as James Hargest High School, and became James Hargest College with the addition of the junior campus as part of a consolidation of schools in 2004.

Salford School is a contributing primary school for years 1 to 6 with a roll of 229 students. The school opened in 1970.
