= Grasmere, New Zealand =

Grasmere
- Suburb
- Interactive map of Grasmere
- Coordinates: 46.383°S 168.338°E
- Country: New Zealand
- City: Invercargill
- Local authority: Invercargill City Council

Area
  - Land: 235 ha (580 acres)

Population (June 2025)
  - Total: 3,090
  - Density: 1,310/km^{2} (3,410/sq mi)

West Plains		Waikiwi
	Grasmere	Prestonville
Invercargill Airport	Avenal	Gladstone

Grasmere is a suburb in the New Zealand city of Invercargill.

The area is low-lying and at risk from flooding and sea level rise.

In 1984, Waihopai River burst its banks, causing flooding in Grasmere and other suburbs. Homes and properties were damaged, and some people became homeless or lost their jobs. Flood banks were installed to prevent further floods.

Between 2017 and 2018, Grasmere was the only suburb in Invercargill where the median house price declined.

== Demographics ==
Prestonville-Grasmere statistical area, which also includes Prestonville, covers 2.35 km^{2} (0.91 sq mi) and had an estimated population of 3,090 as of June 2025, with a population density of 1,315 people per km^{2}.

Historical population
Year	Pop.	±% p.a.
2006	3,453	—
2013	3,513	+0.25%
2018	3,720	+1.15%

Before the 2023 census, Prestonville-Grasmere had a larger boundary, covering 3.20 km^{2} (1.24 sq mi). Using that boundary, Prestonville-Grasmere had a population of 3,720 at the 2018 New Zealand census, an increase of 207 people (5.9%) since the 2013 census, and an increase of 267 people (7.7%) since the 2006 census. There were 1,413 households, comprising 1,791 males and 1,929 females, giving a sex ratio of 0.93 males per female. The median age was 36.3 years (compared with 37.4 years nationally), with 792 people (21.3%) aged under 15 years, 690 (18.5%) aged 15 to 29, 1,530 (41.1%) aged 30 to 64, and 711 (19.1%) aged 65 or older.

Ethnicities were 90.2% European/Pākehā, 15.2% Māori, 2.1% Pasifika, 3.7% Asian, and 1.9% other ethnicities. People may identify with more than one ethnicity.

The percentage of people born overseas was 8.6, compared with 27.1% nationally.

Although some people chose not to answer the census's question about religious affiliation, 58.4% had no religion, 33.5% were Christian, 0.3% had Māori religious beliefs, 0.1% were Hindu, 0.2% were Muslim, 0.2% were Buddhist and 1.9% had other religions.

Of those at least 15 years old, 330 (11.3%) people had a bachelor's or higher degree, and 855 (29.2%) people had no formal qualifications. The median income was $31,400, compared with $31,800 nationally. 336 people (11.5%) earned over $70,000 compared to 17.2% nationally. The employment status of those at least 15 was that 1,512 (51.6%) people were employed full-time, 408 (13.9%) were part-time, and 96 (3.3%) were unemployed.

== Education ==
Donovan Primary School is a state contributing primary school for years 1 to 6 with a roll of 342 as of March 2026. The school was established in 2005 through the merger of Grasmere Primary School, Waikiwi School and West Plains School, on the site of the former Collingwood Intermediate School.

Grasmere School, a co-educational state primary school, operated from c. 1928 to 2005. and closed in 2009. The school site was sold to private owners in 2007, Invercargill City Council gave planning approval for the site to be subdivided in 2008, and the site was auctioned off in two parts in 2009.

Collingwood Intermediate School, a year 7 and 8 state intermediate school, operated in Grasmere between 1976 and 2004. It opened with 120 Form 1 students. The school was affected by the major flood in 1984, which also reduced its roll.
