= Disappearance of John Beckenridge and Mike Zhao-Beckenridge =

New Zealand missing people case

- Date: 13 March 2015; 11 years ago
- Location: Invercargill, New Zealand
- Type: Disappearance
- Missing: John Beckenridge; Mike Zhao-Beckenridge

On 13 March 2015, Swedish-born New Zealander John Beckenridge breached a parenting order and picked up his 11-year old stepson Mike Zhao-Beckenridge from a school in Invercargill. Over the following week they were spotted in the Catlins area of New Zealand, southeast of Invercargill. Beckenridge's car was later found at the bottom of sheer cliffs near Curio Bay. Their bodies have never been found. On 25 March 2026, Coroner Marcus Elliot ruled that Beckenridge most likely killed himself and his step-son Mike in a vengeful act against his estranged wife.

== Background ==
=== Prior to disappearance ===
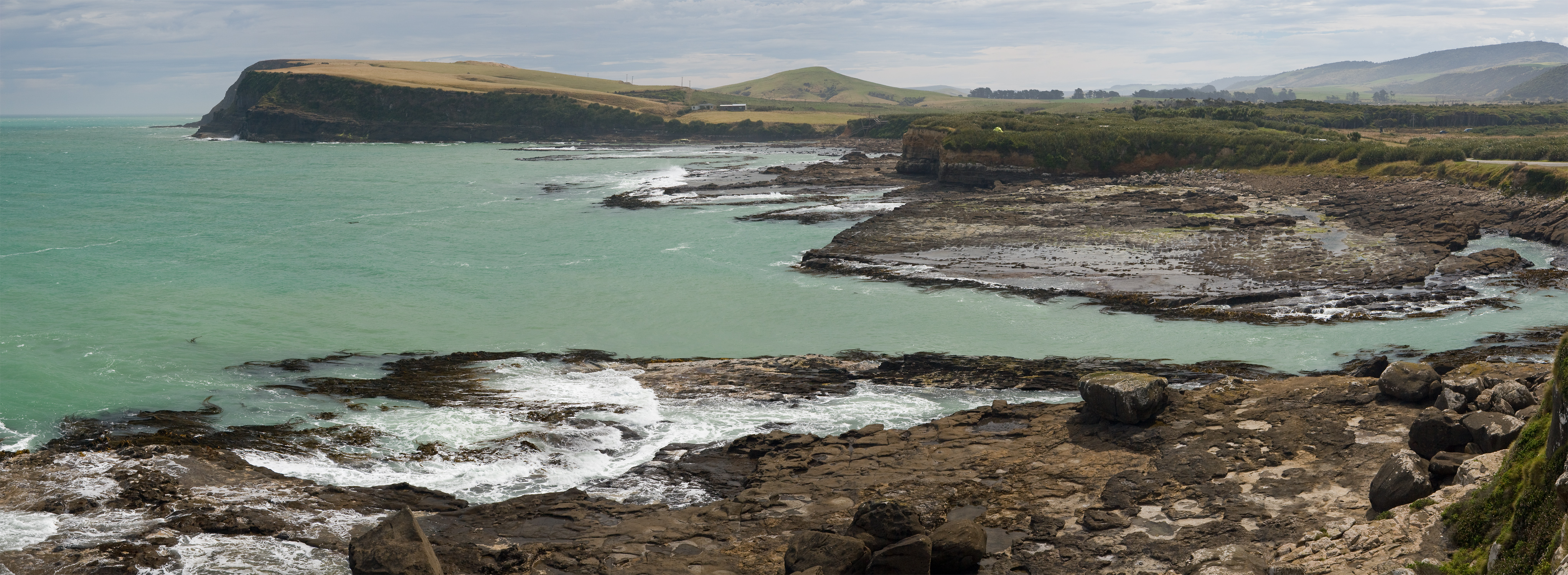
Curio Bay, where Beckenridge's car was later found.

John Beckenridge met Mike's mother, Fiona Lu, in 2006 whilst working in Afghanistan. They later moved to Queenstown, New Zealand, where they resided for many years. Their relationship broke down in 2014, when Fiona moved to Invercargill for a hairdressing course and met her new partner, Peter Russell. In February 2015, Fiona won full custody of her son, who had been living with John in Lake Hayes Estate at the time of the divorce. In the weeks leading up to the pair's disappearance, Mike sent a series of e-mails to John that mentioned self-harm and pleaded to be reunited with his stepfather.

=== Disappearance ===
On March 13, 2015, John Beckenridge picked up Mike from James Hargest College at about lunchtime. The pair were spotted driving across the Catlins area on Wednesday. On March 16 a farmer spotted the pair in Beckenridge's car on his property. The farmer believed they had spent the night sleeping in it. Another witness told officers at the Balclutha police station that they had seen them at a camping site near the Haldane Estuary on March 19. On March 20, Mike Beckenridge's dark blue 4WD Volkswagen Touareg went off a 88 m (289 ft) cliff near Curio Bay. Six weeks later police dragged the wrecked vehicle from the water. Their bodies have never been found.

== Coronial inquiry ==
In 2023, a coronial inquiry was held into the deaths of Beckenridge and Mike. Mike's mother Fiona Lu questioned the police investigation's finding that Beckenridge had killed himself and his step-son in a murder suicide and instead suggested that her ex-husband had staged their deaths and fled the country. Coroner Marcus Elliot did not hold an inquest into their deaths but instead said he would issue an in-chambers' finding based on existing evidence. On 25 March 2026, Coroner Elliott issued his ruling, concluding that the duo most likely died in a murder suicide. He rejected private investigator Mark Templeman's theory that Beckenridge had staged their deaths and fled overseas, stating that it would have involved Beckenridge pretending to be increasingly angry, irrational and faking his dire financial situation. Elliott concluded that Beckenridge was most likely fuelled by rage when he drove his car off the cliff at Curio Bay, killing himself and his step-son.

During the 2023 coronial hearing, Templeman had claimed that Beckenridge had other funding options including a $14,000 superannuation fund in Sweden. Both independent investigator emeritus Auckland University of Technology medical engineer Dr John Raine and Detective Inspector Stu Harvey had concluded that it was unlikely that Beckenridge had exited the vehicle after driving it towards the cliff edge based on the topography and a lack of remote-controlled fixtures on the car wreck. Coroner Elliott said he intended to hold an inquiry into the pair's deaths and invited submissions from the public.

== See also ==
- List of people who disappeared mysteriously (2000–present)
