= Andrew Wheeler =

Andrew Wheeler may refer to:

- Andrew R. Wheeler (born 1964), administrator of the U.S. Environmental Protection Agency
- Andrew Carpenter Wheeler (1835–1903), American drama critic
- Andrew Wheeler (basketball) (born 1988), New Zealand basketball player
- Andrew Wheeler-Omiunu (born 1994), American soccer player

== See also ==
- Andrew Wheeler Doig (1799–1875), American politician
