= Waikiwi Rugby Club =

NZ rugby union club based in Invercargill

(New Zealand) Waikiwi Rugby Club
- Union: New Zealand Rugby Union
- Founded: 1899; 127 years ago
- Location: Invercargill, New Zealand
- Ground: Donovan Park
- President: (New Zealand)
- Coach(es): (New Zealand) Brendon Frew & Marty Godfrey
- League: Southlandwide Division I
- 2010: 6th
Team kit

Official website
- www.pitchero.com/clubs/waikiwi/

Waikiwi Rugby Club is an amateur New Zealand rugby union club who currently play in Southland Wide Division I. Their clubrooms and home ground are at Donovan Park which is off Bainfield Road in the Invercargill suburb of Waikiwi.
