= Prestonville =

Prestonville can refer to:

- Prestonville, Brighton, England, United Kingdom
- Prestonville, Kentucky, United States
- Prestonville, North Carolina, United States
- Prestonville, New Zealand, a suburb of Invercargill
