= Richmond, Invercargill =

Richmond
- Suburb
- Interactive map of Richmond
- Coordinates: 46.4073°S 168.3690°E
- Country: New Zealand
- City: Invercargill
- Local authority: Invercargill City Council

Area
  - Land: 101 ha (250 acres)

Population (June 2025)
  - Total: 2,860
  - Density: 2,830/km^{2} (7,330/sq mi)

Avenal	Windsor	Waverley
Invercargill Central	Richmond	Hawthorndale
Appleby	Turnbull Thomson Park

Richmond is a suburb of New Zealand's southernmost city, Invercargill.

== Demographics ==
Richmond covers 1.01 km^{2} (0.39 sq mi) and had an estimated population of 2,860 as of June 2025, with a population density of 2,832 people per km^{2}.

Historical population
Year	Pop.	±% p.a.
2006	3,336	—
2013	3,342	+0.03%
2018	3,480	+0.81%

Before the 2023 census, Richmond had a larger boundary, covering 1.28 km^{2} (0.49 sq mi). Using that boundary, Richmond had a population of 3,480 at the 2018 New Zealand census, an increase of 138 people (4.1%) since the 2013 census, and an increase of 144 people (4.3%) since the 2006 census. There were 1,479 households, comprising 1,662 males and 1,815 females, giving a sex ratio of 0.92 males per female. The median age was 38.7 years (compared with 37.4 years nationally), with 609 people (17.5%) aged under 15 years, 720 (20.7%) aged 15 to 29, 1,533 (44.1%) aged 30 to 64, and 618 (17.8%) aged 65 or older.

Ethnicities were 84.1% European/Pākehā, 15.3% Māori, 4.1% Pasifika, 8.2% Asian, and 1.8% other ethnicities. People may identify with more than one ethnicity.

The percentage of people born overseas was 14.7, compared with 27.1% nationally.

Although some people chose not to answer the census's question about religious affiliation, 49.4% had no religion, 38.7% were Christian, 0.9% had Māori religious beliefs, 0.8% were Hindu, 0.3% were Muslim, 0.7% were Buddhist and 1.6% had other religions.

Of those at least 15 years old, 528 (18.4%) people had a bachelor's or higher degree, and 636 (22.2%) people had no formal qualifications. The median income was $30,700, compared with $31,800 nationally. 396 people (13.8%) earned over $70,000 compared to 17.2% nationally. The employment status of those at least 15 was that 1,470 (51.2%) people were employed full-time, 387 (13.5%) were part-time, and 105 (3.7%) were unemployed.
