= Windsor North School =

Location
- 91 Chelmsford Street, Invercargill, New Zealand; 46.3934°S 168.3671°E

Information
- Type: Contributing (Year 1-6)
- Motto: Learning for Living
- Established: February 18, 1878
- Ministry of Education Institution no.: 3967
- Principal: Debbie Dickson
- Enrolment: 315 (July 2026)
- Socio-economic decile: 8
- Website: www.windsornorth.school.nz

Windsor North School is a primary school in Invercargill, New Zealand, previously known as Invercargill North School.

The school's history dates to 1878, and the school moved to its current site in the suburb of Windsor the following year. The original school buildings were destroyed by fire in 1889. The only surviving remnant of the original school building is the school bell, which hangs in the foyer of the current administration block. In 1999 a time capsule was planted and is being unearthed in 2025.

North School, as it was originally called, was for some time the largest primary school in Southland with a roll of over 700, but the opening of other schools in the district saw that roll drop to its current level.
