= Windsor, Invercargill =

Windsor
- Suburb
- Interactive map of Windsor
- Coordinates: 46.397°S 168.366°E
- Country: New Zealand
- City: Invercargill
- Local authority: Invercargill City Council

Area
  - Land: 143 ha (350 acres)

Population (June 2025)
  - Total: 3,340
  - Density: 2,340/km^{2} (6,050/sq mi)

Gladstone	Rosedale	Hargest
Avenal	Windsor	Waverley
Invercargill Central	Richmond	Glengarry

Windsor is a suburb of New Zealand's southernmost city, Invercargill.

The area was originally part of expansive Southland farmland and was gradually subdivided in the late 19th and early 20th centuries as Invercargill expanded, with its layout designed to accommodate residential growth near the city center. Early residents were primarily associated with nearby farms, and the suburb developed as a semi-rural community before transitioning into a more fully suburban area.

Historically, Windsor’s growth was closely linked to Southland’s agricultural industries. Local residents were often employed in dairy farming and associated processing, taking advantage of the suburb’s proximity to Invercargill’s creamery and milk distribution facilities. Small-scale businesses also emerged to serve the growing population, including corner shops, service providers, and light commercial operations along key streets. These businesses helped establish Windsor as a self-sufficient community within the broader city.

Education and community institutions have been central to Windsor’s identity. Schools such as Windsor North School, Waverley Park School, and St Theresa’s School have provided generations of children with education, while fostering community connections. The suburb also developed recreational and social hubs, including parks and local halls, which have hosted events and strengthened neighborhood cohesion.

In the late 20th and early 21st centuries, Windsor has continued to evolve, with modern housing developments and lifestyle blocks blending with older homes. The Windsor Shopping Precinct has become a focal point for retail and services, reflecting the suburb’s ongoing growth and vitality. According to the 2018 New Zealand census, Windsor had a population of 3,090 residents, highlighting steady residential growth while maintaining a strong community-oriented character.

The area is home to Rockhaven, an exuberant Queen Anne-style residence built by Ernest Godward, one of New Zealand’s most successful inventors.

== Demographics ==
Windsor covers 1.43 km^{2} (0.55 sq mi) and had an estimated population of 3,340 as of June 2025, with a population density of 2,336 people per km^{2}.

Historical population
Year	Pop.	±% p.a.
2006	3,033	—
2013	2,949	−0.40%
2018	3,090	+0.94%

Before the 2023 census, the suburb had a larger boundary, covering 1.61 km^{2} (0.62 sq mi). Using that boundary, Windsor had a population of 3,090 at the 2018 New Zealand census, an increase of 141 people (4.8%) since the 2013 census, and an increase of 57 people (1.9%) since the 2006 census. There were 1,470 households, comprising 1,383 males and 1,704 females, giving a sex ratio of 0.81 males per female. The median age was 45.3 years (compared with 37.4 years nationally), with 531 people (17.2%) aged under 15 years, 465 (15.0%) aged 15 to 29, 1,311 (42.4%) aged 30 to 64, and 780 (25.2%) aged 65 or older.

Ethnicities were 87.9% European/Pākehā, 11.2% Māori, 3.2% Pasifika, 5.6% Asian, and 2.1% other ethnicities. People may identify with more than one ethnicity.

The percentage of people born overseas was 12.8, compared with 27.1% nationally.

Although some people chose not to answer the census's question about religious affiliation, 41.6% had no religion, 48.5% were Christian, 0.3% had Māori religious beliefs, 0.5% were Hindu, 0.2% were Muslim, 0.7% were Buddhist and 1.6% had other religions.

Of those at least 15 years old, 492 (19.2%) people had a bachelor's or higher degree, and 573 (22.4%) people had no formal qualifications. The median income was $32,100, compared with $31,800 nationally. 429 people (16.8%) earned over $70,000 compared to 17.2% nationally. The employment status of those at least 15 was that 1,233 (48.2%) people were employed full-time, 354 (13.8%) were part-time, and 75 (2.9%) were unemployed.

== Education ==
Windsor North School is a state primary school for years 1 to 6 with a roll of 315 students as of July 2026. It was originally called Invercargill North School, and celebrated its centenary in 1977.

Waverley Park School is a state contributing primary school for years 1 to 6 with a roll of 69 as of July 2026. It was established in 1873.

St Theresa's School is a state-integrated Catholic school for years 1 to 6 with a roll of 249 students as of July 2026. It opened in 1931.
