= Prestonville, New Zealand =

Prestonville
- Suburb
- Interactive map of Prestonville
- Coordinates: 46.385°S 168.348°E
- Country: New Zealand
- City: Invercargill
- Local authority: Invercargill City Council

Area
  - Land: 57 ha (140 acres)

Population (2018 Census)
  - Total: 27
  - Density: 47/km^{2} (120/sq mi)

	Waikiwi	Waihopai
Grasmere, New Zealand	Prestonville	Thomsons Bush
	Gladstone

Prestonville is a suburb and industrial area in the New Zealand city of Invercargill.

The area is low-lying and at risk from flooding and sea level rise.

In 1984, Waihopai River burst its banks, inundating Prestonville "like a tidal wave". It caused major flooding in Prestonville and other suburbs, leading to property damage, homelessness and job losses. Flood banks were installed to prevent further floods.

In the 1980s, a 24-hour aluminium processing plant was established in Prestonville to support the Tiwai Point Aluminium Smelter. Locals successfully campaigned to limit the site's operating hours to 6am to 10pm due to the loud noise it created. The factory closed in 1994.

In 2018, Fire and Emergency New Zealand investigated a series of suspicious fires in Prestonville and other parts of the city.

== Demographics ==
Historical population
Year	Pop.	±% p.a.
2006	27	—
2013	39	+5.39%
2018	27	−7.09%

Prestonville covers 0.57 km^{2} (0.22 sq mi) and is part of the wider Prestonville-Grasmere statistical area.

Prestonville had a population of 27 at the 2018 New Zealand census, a decrease of 12 people (−30.8%) since the 2013 census, and unchanged since the 2006 census. There were 15 households, comprising 12 males and 18 females, giving a sex ratio of 0.67 males per female. The median age was 45.4 years (compared with 37.4 years nationally), with 3 people (11.1%) aged under 15 years, 6 (22.2%) aged 15 to 29, 12 (44.4%) aged 30 to 64, and 9 (33.3%) aged 65 or older.

Ethnicities were 88.9% European/Pākehā, 22.2% Māori, 11.1% Pasifika, and 11.1% other ethnicities. People may identify with more than one ethnicity.

Although some people chose not to answer the census's question about religious affiliation, 44.4% had no religion, and 44.4% were Christian.

Of those at least 15 years old, none had a bachelor's or higher degree, and 9 (37.5%) people had no formal qualifications. The median income was $26,800, compared with $31,800 nationally. The employment status of those at least 15 was that 9 (37.5%) people were employed full-time, 3 (12.5%) were part-time, and 3 (12.5%) were unemployed.
