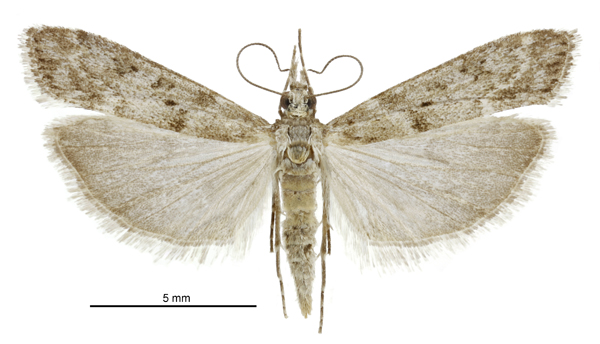
- Female
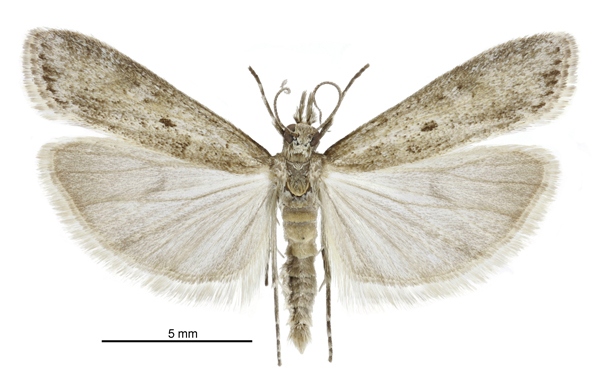
- Male

Scientific classification
- Kingdom: Animalia
- Phylum: Arthropoda
- Class: Insecta
- Order: Lepidoptera
- Family: Crambidae
- Genus: Eudonia
- Species: E. leptalea

Binomial name
- Eudonia leptalea (Meyrick, 1884)

Synonyms
- Scoparia leptalea Meyrick, 1884; Scoparia leptophaea Meyrick, 1902; Eudonia leptalaea (Meyrick, 1884)

= Eudonia leptalea =

Species of moth

Eudonia leptalea is a moth in the family Crambidae. This species is endemic to New Zealand, including the Chatham Islands.

== Taxonomy ==
This species was originally named Scoparia leptalea by Edward Meyrick in 1884. Meyrick gave a description of the species in 1885. John S. Dugdale assigned this species to the genus Eudonia in 1988. However he misspelt the specific epithet leptalaea.

== Description ==
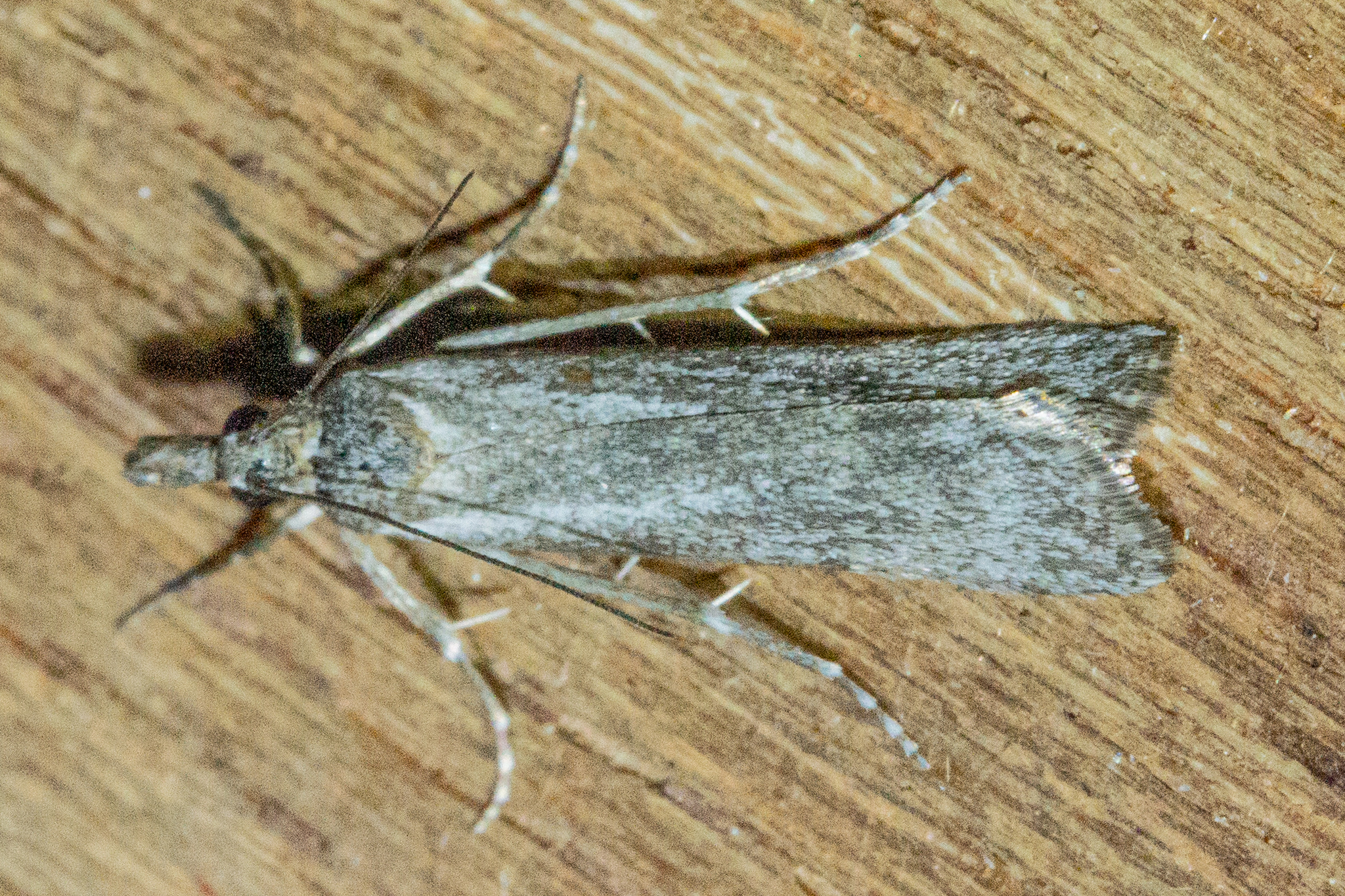
Living moth observed at Kyeburn Diggings, Otago.

The wingspan is 16–19 mm. The forewings are whitish-ochreous or ochreous-grey, irrorated with dark fuscous or black, and densely irrorated with whitish. The markings are variable in distinctness and may sometimes be almost obsolete. The first line is white, margined by dark posteriorly. The second line is white and margined by dark. The hindwings are whitish-grey. The postmedian line is darker and the hindmargin is suffused with darker grey. Adults have been recorded on wing from January to March.
