= Andrew Wheeler (basketball) =

New Zealand basketball player

Personal information
- Born: 18 January 1988 (age 38) Invercargill, New Zealand
- Listed height: 183 cm (6 ft 0 in)
- Listed weight: 88 kg (194 lb)

Career information
- High school: James Hargest College (Invercargill, New Zealand)
- Playing career: 2010–2024
- Position: Point guard
- Coaching career: 2022–present

Career history

Playing
- 2010–2013, 2015–2019, 2021–2024: Southland Sharks

Coaching
- 2022: Southland Sharks (stand-in)
- 2023; 2025: Southland Sharks (assistant)

Career highlights
- 3× NBL champion (2013, 2015, 2018)

Andrew Wheeler (born 18 January 1988) is a New Zealand basketball coach and former player. He played 13 seasons for the Southland Sharks of the National Basketball League (NBL) between 2010 and 2024. He served as an assistant coach with the Sharks in 2025.

== Early life ==
Wheeler was born in Invercargill and attended James Hargest College. He grew up as a basketball addict, but also played rugby and cricket. He studied at the University of Otago and trained with the Otago Nuggets' academy while based in Dunedin.

== Playing career ==
Wheeler was a member of the inaugural Southland Sharks team in 2010, making his NBL debut in the Sharks' opening game before making two other appearances off the bench. Following an incident in Dunedin on 27 March 2010, he was suspended from playing or practising with the Sharks for the rest of the NBL season.

In September 2010, Wheeler was sentenced in the Dunedin District Court to seven months' home detention after admitting a charge of reckless disregard for safety when he struck a man in the face with a beer bottle at a Dunedin flat-warming party in March. For 28 weeks, Wheeler was electronically monitored by an ankle bracelet and confined to his parents' house – only being able to leave for work and the odd recreational allowance. He was welcomed back into the Sharks squad in April 2011. He played sparingly for the Sharks in 2011, 2012 and 2013, but was a member of the championship-winning team in July 2013.

After sitting out the 2014 season due to injury, Wheeler returned to the Sharks in 2015 and won his second NBL championship.

The 2016 season saw new coach Judd Flavell hand Wheeler a larger role on the team, and he subsequently played a career-high 15 games.

Entering the 2017 season, Wheeler became the franchise's longest-serving player. The Sharks made their third NBL final in 2017, but lost 108–75 to the Wellington Saints.

Wheeler's dedication to the Sharks under coach Flavell saw him return once again in 2018. The Sharks went on to reach the NBL final for the fourth time in six years, where they won their third championship with a 98–96 win over the Saints. As a result, Wheeler became the only Sharks player to be part of all three of the franchise's championships.

In 2019, Wheeler returned to the Sharks for a ninth season. He was set to return for his tenth season in 2020 before the effects of the COVID-19 pandemic saw the Sharks withdraw from the season. He played for the Sharks again in 2021 and 2022. On 2 June 2022, Wheeler served as the Sharks' stand-in coach against the Nelson Giants after the team's head coach and assistant coach were ruled out due to Covid. He returned to the Sharks in 2023 in a dual player-assistant coach role. He continued as a player in 2024.

== Coaching career ==
Wheeler joined the Southland Sharks as an assistant coach for the 2025 New Zealand NBL season.

== Personal life ==
Off the court, Wheeler is a lawyer in Invercargill.
