= Invercargill Central =

- Suburb
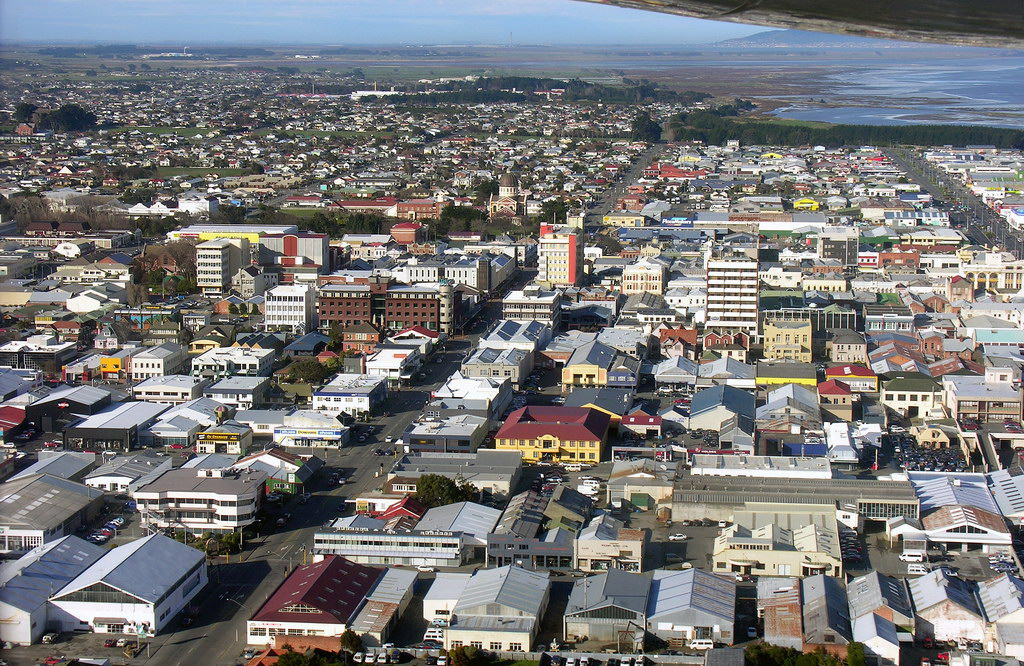
- Downtown Invercargill
- Interactive map of Invercargill Central
- Coordinates: 46.412970°S 168.347416°E
- Country: New Zealand
- City: Invercargill
- Local authority: Invercargill City Council

Area
  - Land: 396 ha (980 acres)

Population (June 2025)
  - Total: 1,370
  - Density: 346/km^{2} (896/sq mi)
- Airports: Invercargill Airport
- Hospitals: Southern Cross Hospital Invercargill

| West Plains | Avenal | Windsor |
| Invercargill Airport | Invercargill Central | Richmond |
| (New River Estuary) | Kew | Appleby |

Invercargill Central is the central business district and central suburb of Invercargill, in the Southland region of the South Island of New Zealand.

It has an estimated population of 1,370 as of June 2025. Invercargill Central is the only area in Southland to contain commercial high rise buildings, which are the most southerly tall buildings in the world.

== Demographics ==
Invercargill Central statistical area covers 9.18 km^{2} (3.54 sq mi), but this includes Invercargill Airport, which has an area of 5.22 km^{2} (2.02 sq mi) but no resident population, so the populated part of Invercargill Central covers 3.96 km^{2} (1.53 sq mi) This part had an estimated population of 1,370 as of June 2025, with a population density of 346 people per km^{2}.

Historical population
| Year | Pop. | ±% p.a. |
|---|---|---|
| 2006 | 1,155 | — |
| 2013 | 1,125 | −0.38% |
| 2018 | 1,365 | +3.94% |

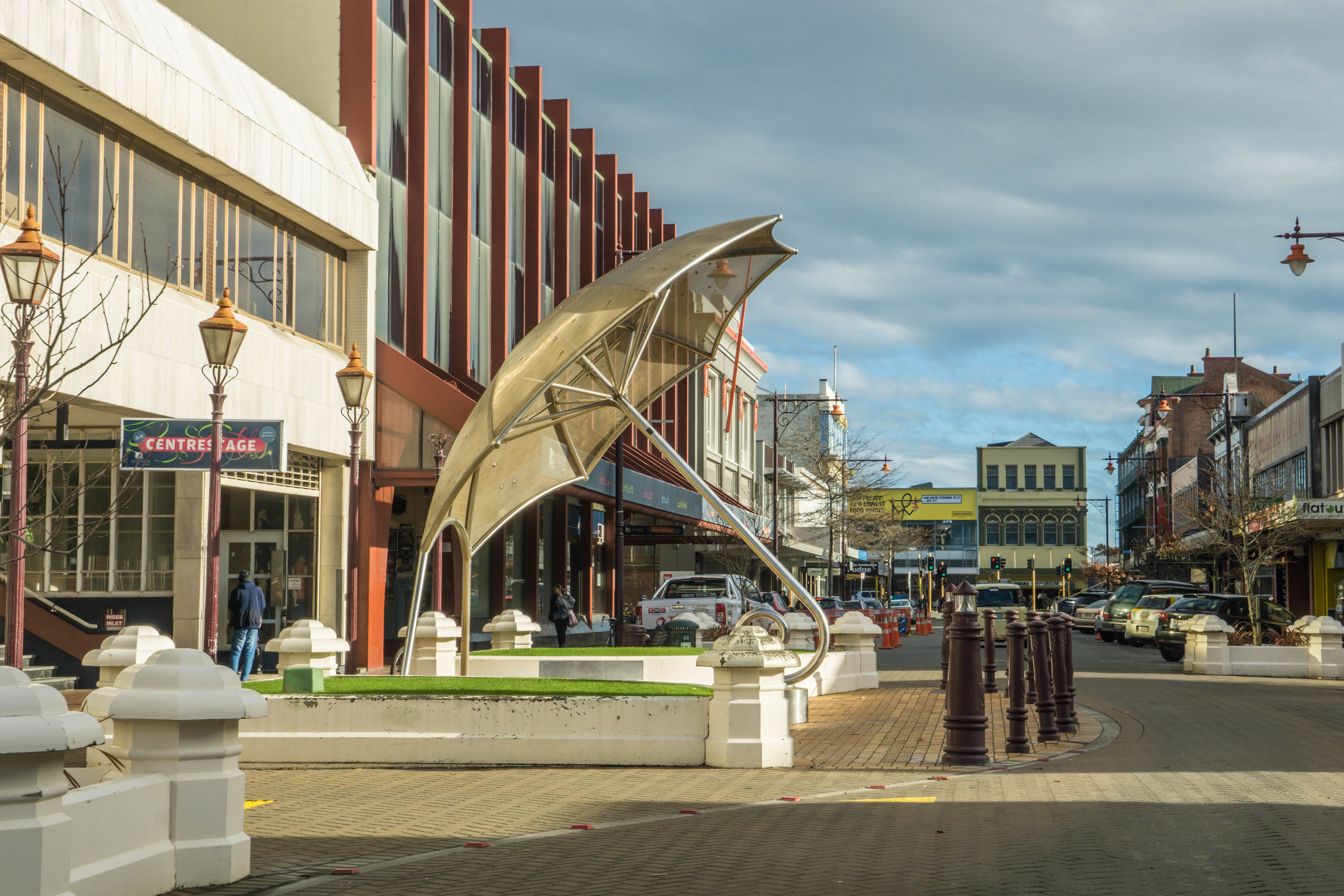
The Umbrella sculpture in Don Street (now relocated to Otakaro Park)

Invercargill Central had a population of 1,365 at the 2018 New Zealand census, an increase of 240 people (21.3%) since the 2013 census, and an increase of 210 people (18.2%) since the 2006 census. There were 462 households, comprising 777 males and 591 females, giving a sex ratio of 1.31 males per female. The median age was 34.6 years (compared with 37.4 years nationally), with 126 people (9.2%) aged under 15 years, 420 (30.8%) aged 15 to 29, 627 (45.9%) aged 30 to 64, and 195 (14.3%) aged 65 or older.

Ethnicities were 60.9% European/Pākehā, 14.7% Māori, 2.6% Pasifika, 27.5% Asian, and 4.4% other ethnicities. People may identify with more than one ethnicity.

The percentage of people born overseas was 36.0, compared with 27.1% nationally.

Although some people chose not to answer the census's question about religious affiliation, 41.3% had no religion, 36.7% were Christian, 0.4% had Māori religious beliefs, 5.3% were Hindu, 2.9% were Muslim, 2.4% were Buddhist and 4.0% had other religions.

Of those at least 15 years old, 285 (23.0%) people had a bachelor's or higher degree, and 231 (18.6%) people had no formal qualifications. The median income was $16,500, compared with $31,800 nationally. 84 people (6.8%) earned over $70,000 compared to 17.2% nationally. The employment status of those at least 15 was that 396 (32.0%) people were employed full-time, 216 (17.4%) were part-time, and 114 (9.2%) were unemployed.

== Education ==
Invercargill Middle School is a state contributing primary school for years 1 to 6 with a roll of 157 students as of July 2026. The school opened in 1873 as Invercargill Grammar School, became Invercargill District High School and then Invercargill Central School, and adopted the current name in 1885.

St Joseph's School is a state-integrated Catholic school for year 1 to 8 with a roll of 153 students. The school has a continuous history from 1882 and traces its origins to the late 1860s.

The Southern Institute of Technology's three Invercargill campuses are located in Invercargill Central.

== Tourism ==
Invercargill Central has several transport-themed tourist attractions including the E Hayes and Sons hardware store that features Burt Munro's original motorcycle, the Bill Richardson Transport World, Classic Motorcycle Mecca, and Dig This.
