= Avenal, New Zealand =

Avenal
- Suburb
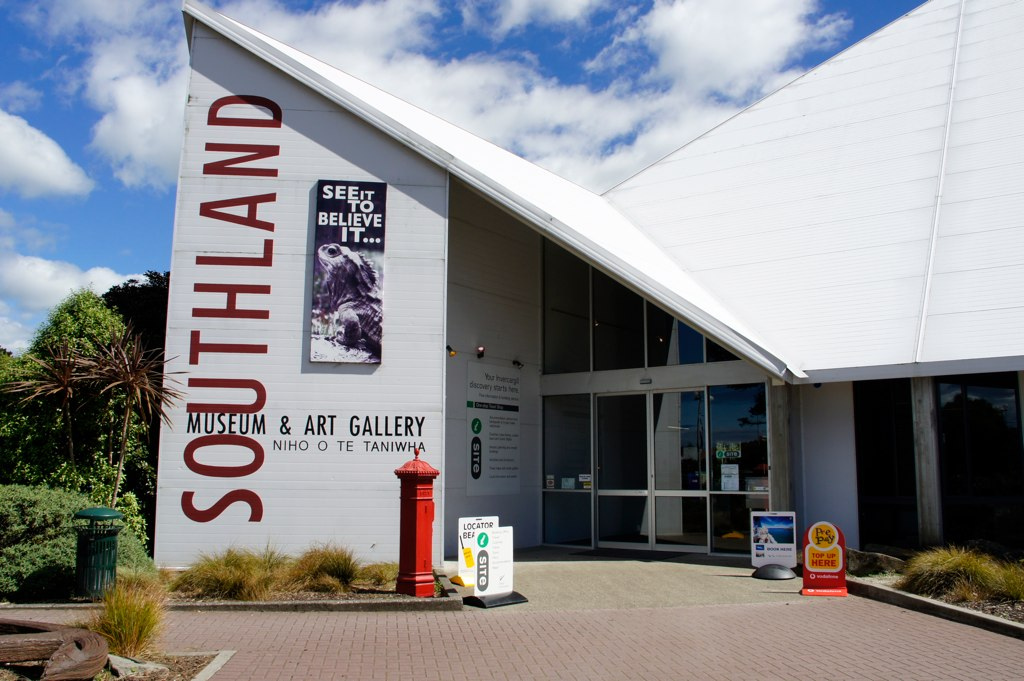
- Southland Museum and Art Gallery
- Interactive map of Avenal
- Coordinates: 46.399°S 168.347°E
- Country: New Zealand
- City: Invercargill
- Local authority: Invercargill City Council

Area
  - Land: 143 ha (350 acres)

Population (June 2025)
  - Total: 1,270
  - Density: 888/km^{2} (2,300/sq mi)

	Gladstone	Rosedale
(Waihopai River)	Avenal	Windsor
	Invercargill Central	Richmond

Avenal is a suburb of New Zealand's southernmost city, Invercargill. The suburb includes Queens Park and Southland Museum and Art Gallery.

== Demographics ==
Avenal covers 1.43 km^{2} (0.55 sq mi) and had an estimated population of 1,270 as of June 2025, with a population density of 888 people per km^{2}.

Historical population
Year	Pop.	±% p.a.
2006	1,158	—
2013	1,131	−0.34%
2018	1,263	+2.23%

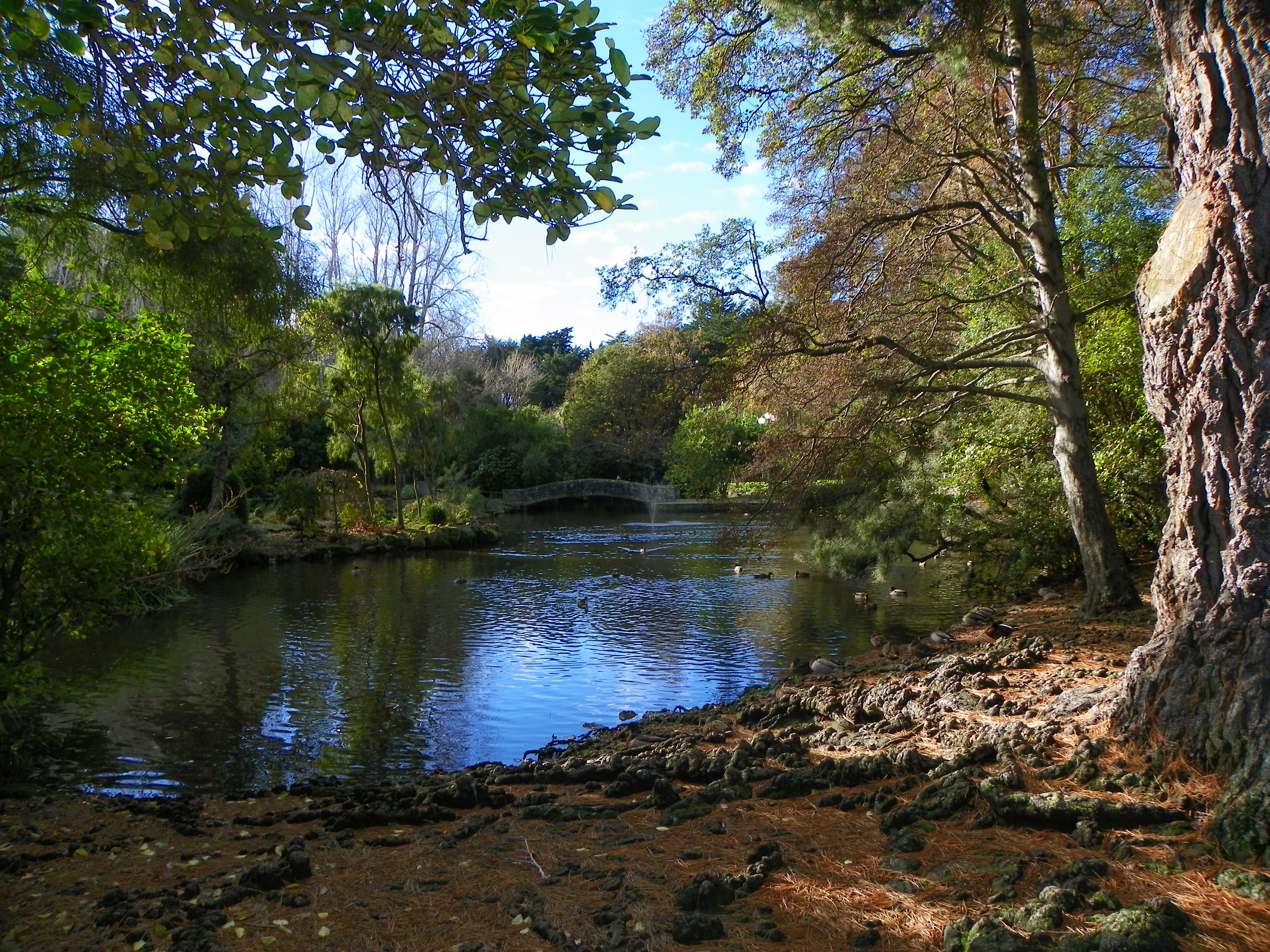
Queens Park

Avenal had a population of 1,263 at the 2018 New Zealand census, an increase of 132 people (11.7%) since the 2013 census, and an increase of 105 people (9.1%) since the 2006 census. There were 555 households, comprising 615 males and 648 females, giving a sex ratio of 0.95 males per female. The median age was 36.9 years (compared with 37.4 years nationally), with 216 people (17.1%) aged under 15 years, 270 (21.4%) aged 15 to 29, 618 (48.9%) aged 30 to 64, and 159 (12.6%) aged 65 or older.

Ethnicities were 79.8% European/Pākehā, 13.1% Māori, 2.9% Pasifika, 14.0% Asian, and 2.4% other ethnicities. People may identify with more than one ethnicity.

The percentage of people born overseas was 21.9, compared with 27.1% nationally.

Although some people chose not to answer the census's question about religious affiliation, 52.7% had no religion, 32.8% were Christian, 0.5% had Māori religious beliefs, 2.9% were Hindu, 0.5% were Muslim, 1.9% were Buddhist and 1.9% had other religions.

Of those at least 15 years old, 261 (24.9%) people had a bachelor's or higher degree, and 198 (18.9%) people had no formal qualifications. The median income was $32,700, compared with $31,800 nationally. 153 people (14.6%) earned over $70,000 compared to 17.2% nationally. The employment status of those at least 15 was that 579 (55.3%) people were employed full-time, 159 (15.2%) were part-time, and 51 (4.9%) were unemployed.

== Education ==
St John's Girls' School is a state-integrated single-sex school providing education for years 1 to 8 with a roll of 124 as of July 2026. It opened in 1917 as an Anglican school, became independent of the church after the depression (although it maintains a Christian education ethos), and became state-integrated in 1990.
