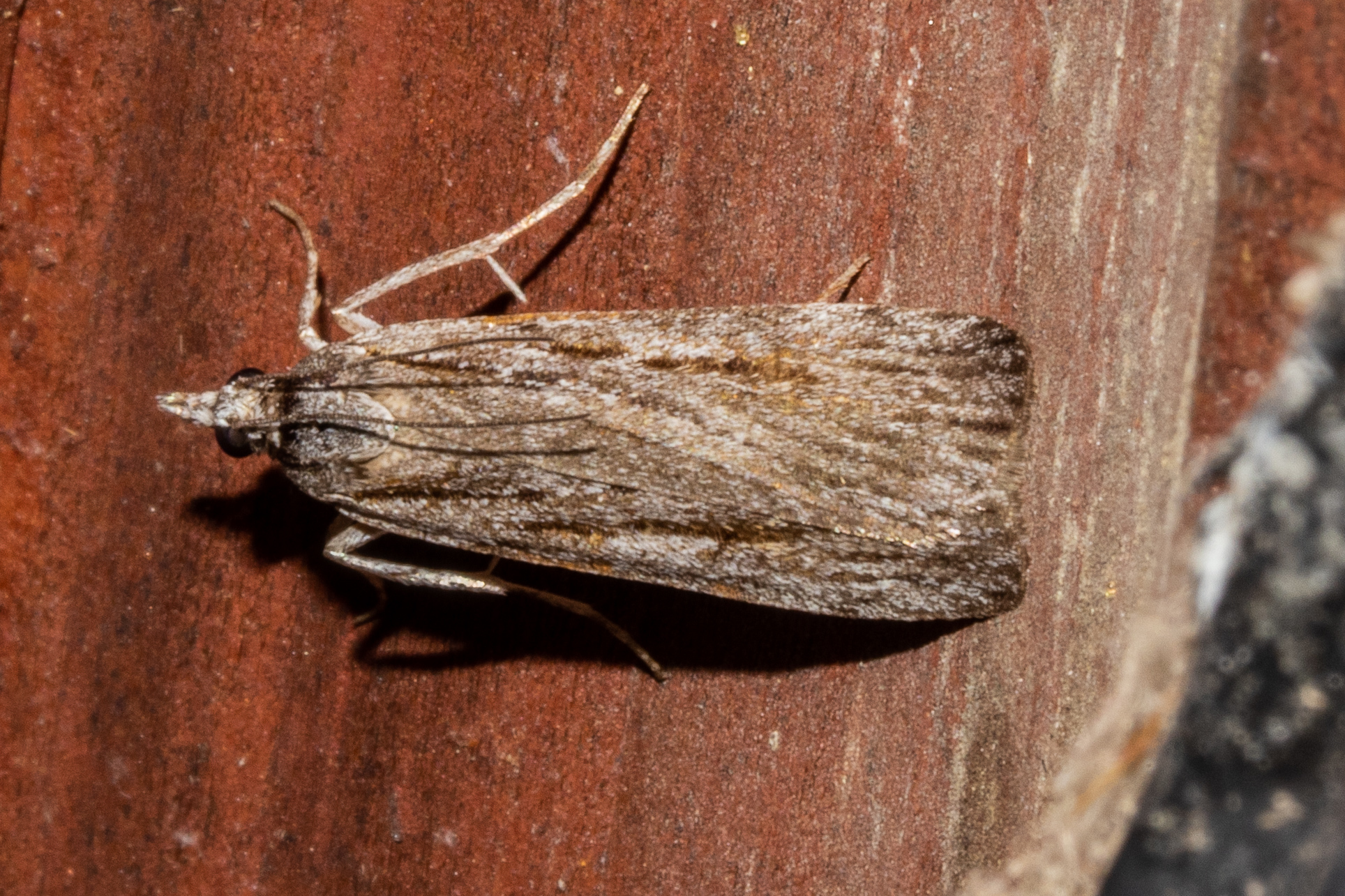
- Eudonia paltomacha found in the Otago Peninsula, New Zealand

Scientific classification
- Kingdom: Animalia
- Phylum: Arthropoda
- Class: Insecta
- Order: Lepidoptera
- Family: Crambidae
- Genus: Eudonia
- Species: E. paltomacha

Binomial name
- Eudonia paltomacha (Meyrick, 1884)

Synonyms
- Scoparia paltomacha Meyrick, 1884; Witlesia paltomacha (Meyrick, 1884)

= Eudonia paltomacha =

Species of moth

Eudonia paltomacha is a moth in the family Crambidae. It was described by Edward Meyrick in 1884. It is endemic to New Zealand.

The wingspan is 22–24 mm for males and about 17 mm for females. The forewings are light fuscous, irrorated with whitish. The veins are lined with blackish and there is a whitish dot in the disc beyond the middle, margined above with blackish. The hindwings are grey-whitish. Adults have been recorded on wing in January.

== Gallery ==
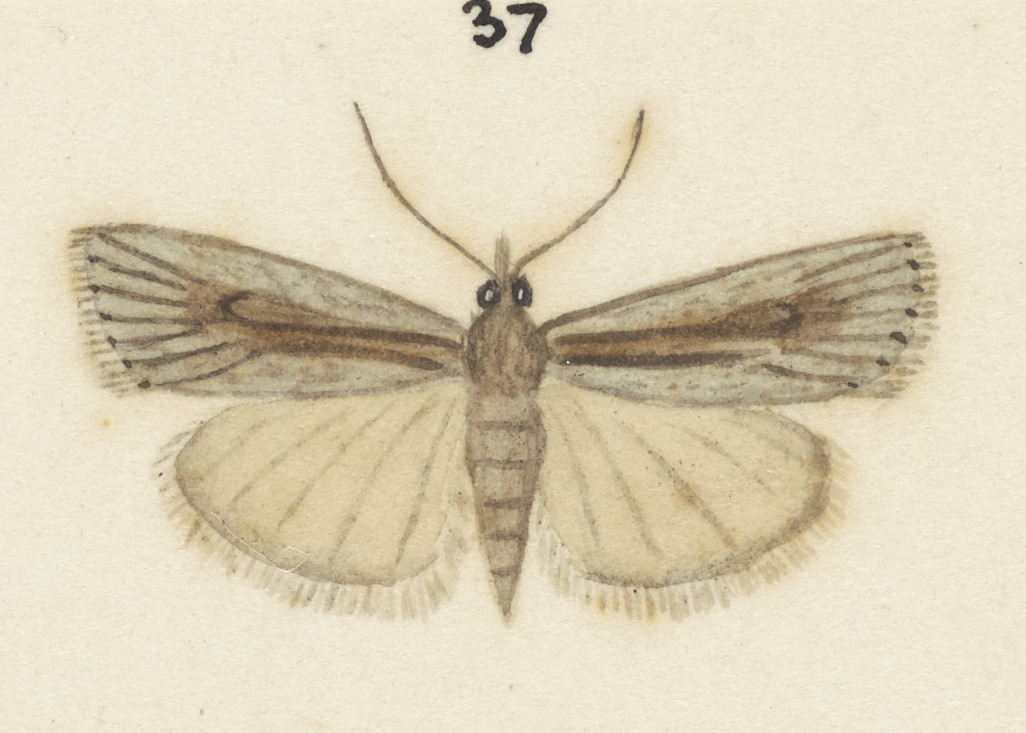
Illustration of female

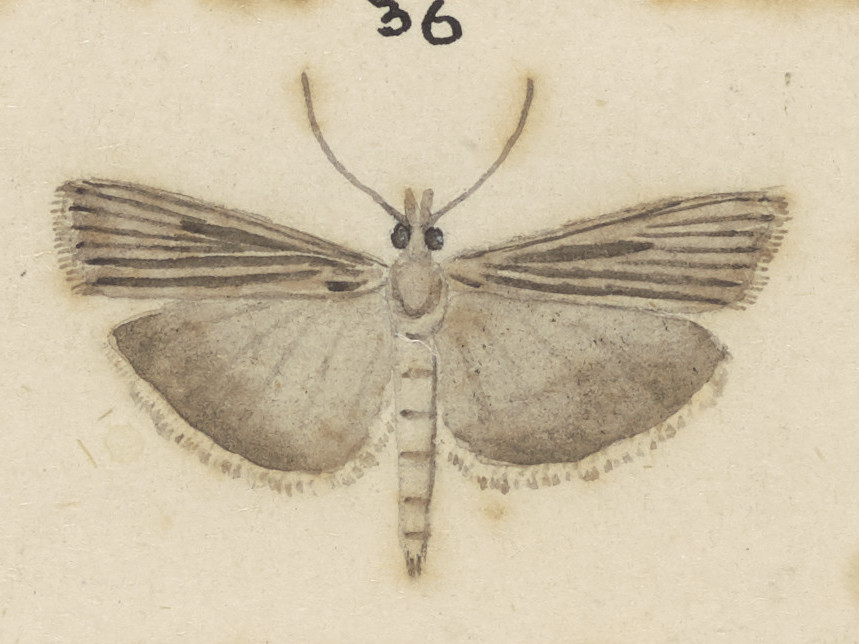
Illustration of male
