= James Hargest College =

- Māori: Te Kura o Hēmi Hakena

Location
- 6 Layard Street, Invercargill (Junior Campus) 288 Layard Street, Invercargill (Senior Campus); 46.3904°S 168.3835°E (Senior); 46.3907°S 168.3622°E (Junior)

Information
- Type: State Co-Educational Secondary (Year 7–13) with divided campuses
- Motto: Keep Faith
- Established: 1958; 68 years ago
- Ministry of Education Institution no.: 552
- Principal: Anna McDowall
- Enrolment: 1,897 (July 2026)
- Houses: Watson, Hamilton, Menzies, Thompson
- Socio-economic decile: 8P
- Website: www.jameshargest.school.nz

James Hargest College (Māori: Te Kura o Hēmi Hakena) is a large school of 1,900 students (as of July 2025), in Invercargill, New Zealand. The school caters for students from year 7–13.

The school is divided into two campuses, known as James Hargest Junior Campus (Year 7–8) and James Hargest Senior Campus (Year 9–13). The campuses are at opposite ends of Layard Street and are separated by about a 15-minute walk (1.5 km).

James Hargest College is named after Brigadier James Hargest.

== Junior campus ==
James Hargest College's Junior Campus was formerly known as Rosedale Intermediate School until it became part of the former James Hargest High School to make James Hargest College as part of the Ministry of Education review of schools in 2004. Other intermediate schools in the city merged with the newly formed James Hargest Junior Campus, increasing the school's roll and stretching resources. Because of this, a new technology block was built, and several new classrooms have been built since the merge. There are 19 homeroom classrooms with an approximated amount of enrolled students being 600 as of October 2025.

The subjects in the Technology Block (known as the Atrium) include Science, Art, Woodwork (known as Hard Materials), Foods & Fabrics, and ICT & Media Suite, and Music.

== Senior campus ==
The Senior Campus covers Years 9–13, and as of 1 July 2025 had 1,900 enrolled students.

The school has multiple blocks, which are used for different purposes:

- A Block – Administration Block. Contains Main Office, Hall, Student Administration, Staffroom, Deans and Associate/Deputy Principals Offices.
- B Block – 4x Language Classrooms, 5x Science Laboratories, two standard classrooms, which were formerly computer rooms, and the Student Support Centre. After the refurbishment of F block, this block is set to be demolished.
- C Block – Commerce and Food and Fabrics Department. Subjects taught here – Digital Technologies (3x Computer Classrooms), Food Technology (2x Food Labs) and Fashion and Design.
  - This block was badly damaged by a fire on 3 January 2013 by Arson after undergoing a refurbishment which resulted in the block being torn down and completely rebuilt, which was completed April 2014. During this period of rebuilding, subjects such Digital Technologies were taught in other classrooms around the school, and Food Technology classes were bussed down to the Junior Campus to have lessons.
- D Block – Art & Visual Design (3x Classrooms), Design & Visual Communication, one Science Laboratory, and a Metal & Wood Workshop (Hard Materials) .
- E Block – E1-E5 is Mathematics and Theory Subjects (PE & Health Theory). E6-E7 is Science and Horticulture (2x Science Laboratories) and E8-E15 is English.
- F Block – Social Sciences. The upstairs blocks (F6 to F9) are also used for Accounting, Mathematics and Economics.
- G Block – Gyms 1–3 are all located and are used for teaching physical education, as well as sports at lunchtime. Gym 3 is the largest gym of them all, used for large events such as the End of Year prizegivings. An upstairs gallery is located in the Gym allowing students to sit upstairs and watch sports at lunchtime.
- M Block – Used for teaching and practising Music.
- N Block – Extra "prefab" Classrooms used for teaching Mathematics, Science (Theory), Physical Education (Theory) and Childcare and Development.
- P Block – P1 is used for additional classrooms for Physical Education and Health Education, and is the form class for Whanau, a Māori language Homeroom. P2 and P3 are used for teaching English. P4 is the Year 13 Common room. P5-P7 are also used for teaching English, and Drama. P8 is used as a storage room. The block is now located in front of the newly built S block.
- S block - Also known as Sir Peter Beck Block, it is a new block specifically for Science, with separate laboratories and classrooms.
- The school also has a $2.2 million library, which officially opened on the 10th of March 2004 by Christine French and Murray Frost that also includes the Guidance and Careers Centre, as well as a Library, Reading Room and Library Classroom. The library's classroom has desks and an interactive whiteboard, as well as the reading room where students can browse the library's collection of magazines, newspapers and many books.

=== Hargest Centre ===
The Hargest Centre is a large building at the Senior Campus. The large gymnasium viewing gallery is popular with students who often go there to watch interclass sports at lunch break. There is a cafeteria at the centre, where students can purchase their lunch, and there are tables for the Senior students (years 11, 12 and 13) to eat indoors. It was opened on the 3rd of June 1994 by Brian McKechnie.

=== C Block Fire ===
During the early hours of Thursday 3 January 2013, the C Block was badly damaged by a deliberately lit fire. The block was undergoing major renovations at the time. Fortunately, most of the equipment in the block, such as computers and servers, had been removed months prior to the fire. On 15 January 2013, it was revealed that the fire was deliberately lit by two ex-students of the school. They were sentenced to 3 years, 4 months jail and 3 years, 6 months jail respectively.

== Sports ==
School sports are popular and well established at Hargest. The school frequently shares inter school sporting competitions with rivals Logan Park High School in Dunedin and Gore High School in Gore. The Junior Campus also has a sports exchange with Oamaru Intermediate School (OIS), with competitions in rugby, netball, basketball, hockey, water polo, chess and Minecraft build challenges.

Students can partake in a very wide variety of sports to represent the school, and there are often notices for tryouts in provincial sports teams.

Everyone at Hargest is placed into a school house, which are used for form classes at the Senior Campus. These are Menzies (green), Watson (blue), Thompson (red) and Hamilton (yellow). Near the beginning of each school year, the four houses compete for points at an athletics competition at Surrey Park Athletics Park, next to Stadium Southland. All Junior Campus students participate, and Senior Campus students get to choose whether to participate.

== Leadership ==
The school employs a leadership system (known as the "senior leadership team" or "SLT"), which includes the Associate and Deputy principals along with the principal:

- Principal: Mike Newell
- Associate Principal: Caroline Raynes
- Associate Principal (Junior Campus): Kate Webster
- Deputy Principal: Anna McDowall
- Deputy Principal: Bryan Forde
- Deputy Principal (Junior Campus): Kristine Simpson
- Assistant Principal: Paul Redmond (former Hamilton house dean)

Students are preferred to go to the Deputies or Associate principal before escalating a problem to the principal.

== Principals ==
On 24 August 2009, Paul O'Connor, who had been the principal since 1993, announced his resignation from the role due to retirement. He remained principal until the end of 2009. On 5 November 2009, Andy Wood was announced as Paul O'Connor's successor in the role. Wood was principal of Central Southland College in the nearby town Winton. Wood was also deputy principal of the college from 1982 to 2003. He began in the role in the first term of 2010. In November 2019, Mike Newell, the principal of Northern Southland College, was announced as the new principal of the school. He started at the beginning of Term 2, 2020.

At the start of 2025, Mike Newell announced his resignation as principal due to his uptake of the Chief Advisory Role at the new Crown entity, New Zealand School Property Agency. Anna McDowall has been selected to replace Newell as principal at the start of Term 2.

== Clubs and Groups ==
James Hargest College is home to various internal and external clubs and groups. These include:

=== Leo Club ===
The school hosts the Leo Lions Club. A club intended to develop leadership qualities by participating in social service activities.

=== Duke Of Edinburgh ===
The Duke of Edinburgh club headed by Ms Megan Smith, a Digital Technologies Media teacher, is intended to encourage student self improvement through a combination of volunteering, physical activity, developing skills and completing an expedition.

== Notable alumni ==
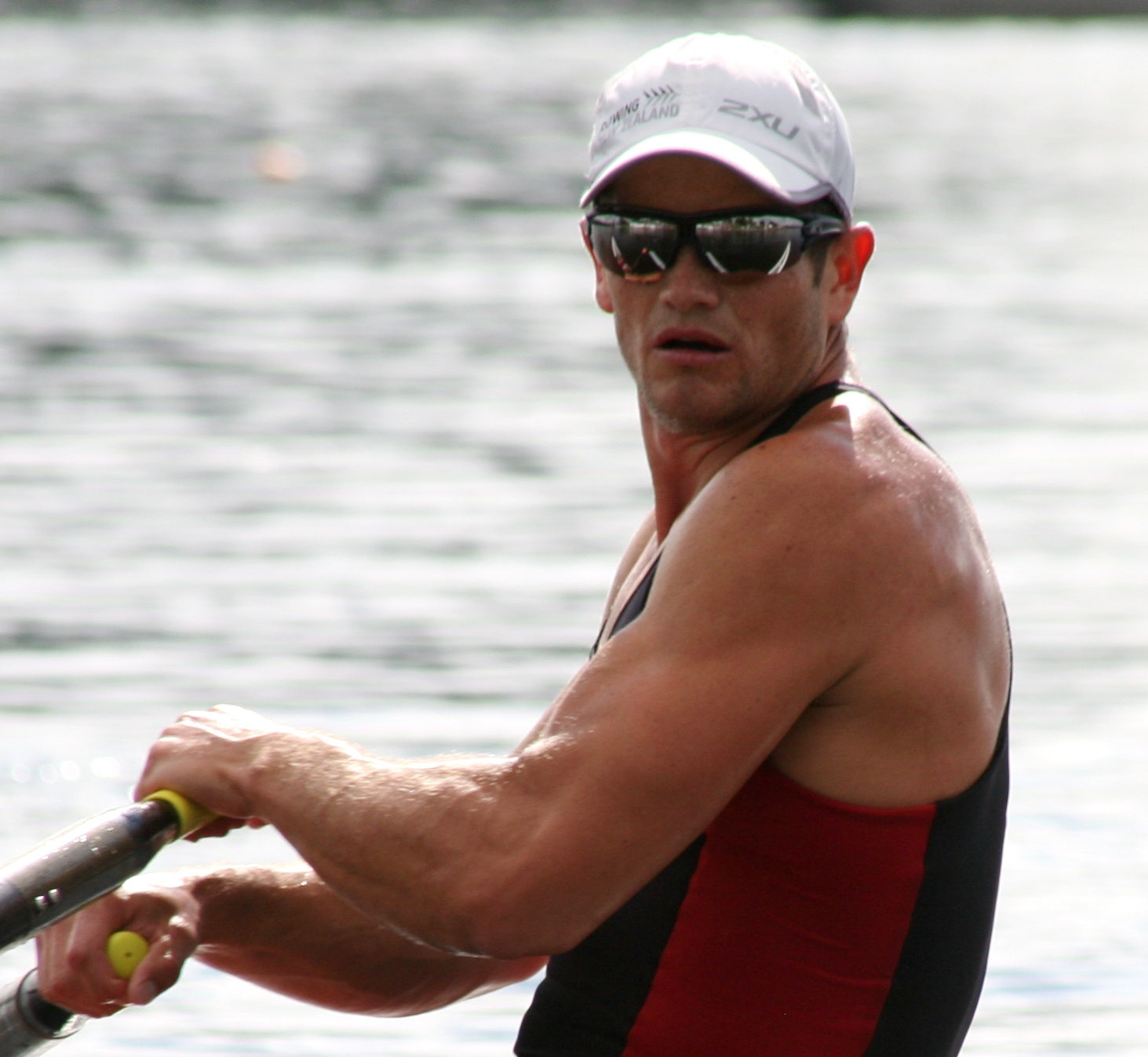
Nathan Cohen

- Steve Broad – X Factor and New Zealand Idol and More FM Breakfast Announcer
- Nathan Cohen – Olympic champion and two-time world champion rower
- Eddie Dawkins – Gold medal at 2010 Cycling World Cup, silver at 2011 Cycling World Cup
- Jon Gadsby – comedian
- Suzanne Prentice – country singer
- Bonnie Soper – actress on Shortland Street
- Storm Uru – Olympic rower
- Andrew Wheeler – basketball player
- Peter Beck – CEO of Rocket Lab
- Todd Stephenson - Member of Parliament, New Zealand House of Representatives
- Justice Christine French – Court of Appeal Judge
