= 1984 Southland floods =

Weather event in New Zealand

1984 Southland flood
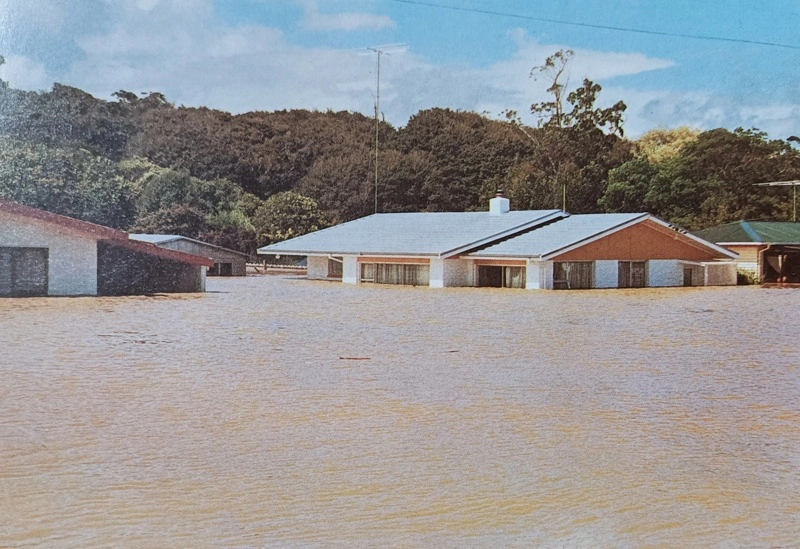
- Flooded homes
- Date: 26 January 1984
- Location: Southland Region, New Zealand

In late January 1984, the Southland and Fiordland regions of New Zealand's South Island experienced a strong north-westerly front and moist conditions, which led to heavy rainfall and flooding between 26 and 27 January. Several urban centres and towns in Southland including Invercargill, Riverton, Bluff, Otautau and Tuatapere experienced significant flooding. In response, the Mayor of Invercargill Eve Poole and Civil Defence authorities declared local states of emergency in Invercargill and much of Southland. The 1984 Southland floods caused significant damage to local housing, farms, infrastructure, and property, with insurance claims amounting to between $45.8 million and $55 million ($198 million and $238 million, adjusted for inflation).

== Flood event ==
According to the National Institute of Water and Atmospheric Research (NIWA), the lower South Island experienced a strong north-westerly airstream between 26 and 28 January 1984. Heavy rain was caused by a frontal band stalling over the lower South Island, which was reinforced by a very strong, warm moist pre-frontal flow and the orographic descent of moist low-level air over the Fiordland mountains. Rainfall values reached the high 30s at times. NIWA believed that the frontal band had originated in the tropical regions of north and north-western Australia. While the Canterbury and Otago regions also experienced heavy rainfall, the Southland and Fiordland bore the brunt of the wet weather front due to a deep layer of humid air during a 36-hour period between 26 and 27 January. In Southland's high country areas, the hills and mountains were inundated by the moist north-westerly airstream. This weather flow was met by a southerly front, resulting in heavy rainfall in the lower-lying parts of Southland.

While it was raining in Southland and Fiordland on the morning of 26 January, the rain was forecast to become heavy within 18 hours. Throughout the day the rain got stronger, and after meeting with a southerly front, the streets of Invercargill, Riverton, Bluff, Otautau and Tuatapere started to experience surface flooding at about 9 pm. The floodwaters continued to rise, river banks started overflowing, and houses were flooded. Sandbags and pumping were used to defend against the water, but this did not work well.

There was 143 mm (5.6 in) of rainfall in total, which was "almost twice as much" as the month's average. On 26 January, Invercargill had 84.8 mm (3.34 in) of rain. For the 24 hours before 9 am on 27 January, Invercargill Airport had reported 134 mm (5.3 in) of rain. According to NIWA, many areas in Southland experienced 100 mm (3.9 in) of rain, with 13 sites in the Southland plains reporting 130 mm (5.1 in) over a 24-hour period. Rainfall over much of the region exceeded the 100-year return period values. Some Fiordland mountains experienced heavy rainfall with return periods of between five and ten years.

The Otepuni Creek and Waihopai River overflowed, which caused the evacuation of about 5,000 people.

== Impact and responses ==
Mayor Poole declared a state of emergency on 27 January at 4 am due to severe flooding. By this time entire streets had flooded and people throughout the town were evacuated from their homes. The flooding occurred throughout Southland so the state of emergency was extended to cover it at mid-morning. The rain stopped on the same day, but the flooding continued to get worse. At one point, Invercargill Airport was 3 metres (9.8 ft) deep in water and 10 aeroplanes were partly submerged. It took until 27 February for the state of emergency to be lifted. In addition, a Civil Defence declaration remained in force throughout much of Southland between 27 January and 9 February 1984.

In Invercargill, about 4,000 people were evacuated from 1,000 homes, and it took about a week for them to be able to return. Helicopters rescued a few people from rooftops. Some people had trouble evacuating because they did not want to leave their pets behind. In Otautau, 300 people were evacuated from 190 houses. In Tuatapere, 70 homes were evacuated and 37 were flooded. About 1,200 houses were condemned, and roughly 5,000 tonnes of personal possessions had to be disposed of. Hundreds of flood-damaged vehicles were sold in Invercargill at public auction, and an endorsement of their flood-damaged status was added to their ownership papers.

There were no human fatalities, although over 12,000 sheep, 334 pigs, 100 cattle and 75 deer died or were 'lost'. In addition, 170 km (110 mi) of fencing, 52 farm bridges and 234 culverts were destroyed.

In terms of transportation, all of Southland's roads and railways were flooded, cutting the region off from the rest of the country and 100 bridges were also damaged. Air services were also suspended.

In response to the flooding, civil defence sirens were installed in Invercargill in 1984 and 1985.

== Aftermath ==
Paid out insurance claims totalled $45.8 million ($198 million, adjusted for inflation), and damage was estimated from $50 million to $55 million ($216 million to $238 million, adjusted for inflation). A public flood relief appeal raised NZ$6 million. A book of photographs of the flood, Southland's Black Friday, was published to support the appeal.

In two Invercargill streets 29 houses could not be protected from flooding and were to be relocated.

In January 2024, Environment Southland described the event as a 'catalyst' for flood protection upgrades that were later done in the area.
