= West Plains, New Zealand =

West Plains
- Locality
- Interactive map of West Plains
- Coordinates: 46.369°S 168.312°E
- Country: New Zealand
- Region: Southland region
- Territorial authority: Invercargill
- Electorates: Invercargill; Te Tai Tonga (Māori)

Government
  - Territorial authority: Southland District Council
  - Regional council: Southland Regional Council
  - Mayor of Southland: Rob Scott
  - Invercargill MP: Penny Simmonds
  - Te Tai Tonga MP: Tākuta Ferris

Area
  - Total: 87.87 km^{2} (33.93 sq mi)

Population (June 2025)
  - Total: 1,810
  - Density: 20.6/km^{2} (53.4/sq mi)
- Local iwi: Ngāi Tahu

West Plains is a locality in the Southland Region of New Zealand, northwest of Invercargill and north of Otatara. Ōreti River and its tributary Makarewa River flow through the plains. It is part of the Southland Plains.

== Demographics ==
West Plains-Makarewa statistical area covers 87.87 km^{2} (33.93 sq mi) and had an estimated population of 1,810 as of June 2025, with a population density of 21 people per km^{2}.

Historical population
Year	Pop.	±% p.a.
2006	1,365	—
2013	1,509	+1.44%
2018	1,608	+1.28%

West Plains-Makarewa had a population of 1,608 at the 2018 New Zealand census, an increase of 99 people (6.6%) since the 2013 census, and an increase of 243 people (17.8%) since the 2006 census. There were 594 households, comprising 852 males and 756 females, giving a sex ratio of 1.13 males per female. The median age was 45.5 years (compared with 37.4 years nationally), with 297 people (18.5%) aged under 15 years, 207 (12.9%) aged 15 to 29, 873 (54.3%) aged 30 to 64, and 231 (14.4%) aged 65 or older.

Ethnicities were 94.0% European/Pākehā, 11.8% Māori, 2.1% Pasifika, 1.7% Asian, and 1.7% other ethnicities. People may identify with more than one ethnicity.

The percentage of people born overseas was 7.6, compared with 27.1% nationally.

Although some people chose not to answer the census's question about religious affiliation, 52.1% had no religion, 37.9% were Christian, 0.6% had Māori religious beliefs, 0.6% were Buddhist and 0.7% had other religions.

Of those at least 15 years old, 174 (13.3%) people had a bachelor's or higher degree, and 345 (26.3%) people had no formal qualifications. The median income was $37,000, compared with $31,800 nationally. 249 people (19.0%) earned over $70,000 compared to 17.2% nationally. The employment status of those at least 15 was that 756 (57.7%) people were employed full-time, 237 (18.1%) were part-time, and 30 (2.3%) were unemployed.

== Education ==
West Plains School was established c.1882. It was merged to Grasmere School in January 2005.
