= PGG Wrightson =

New Zealand stock and station agency

PGG Wrightson Limited
- Type: Public
- Traded as: NZX: PGW
- Industry: Pastoral
- Founded: November 2005
- Headquarters: Christchurch, New Zealand
- Key people: Stephen Guerin (CEO)
- Products: Stock and station agent
- Number of employees: 2,100
- Website: pggwrightson.co.nz

PGG Wrightson Limited is an agricultural supply business based in New Zealand. It was created in 2005 through the merger of Pyne Gould Guinness Ltd and Wrightson Limited and has its roots in a number of stock and station agencies dating back to 1861. It is one of the major suppliers to the agricultural sector in New Zealand providing products such as seeds, grains, livestock, irrigation, farm equipment, insurance and financing.

== History ==
The result of mergers within the stock and station agency industry in New Zealand, PGG Wrightson can trace its obvious ancestry back to 1861, with the establishment of Wright Stephenson & Co.

Notable stock and station agencies that have merged to form PGG Wrightson include

PGG Wrightson 2005

- Wrightson NMA 1972
  - Wright Stephenson & Co (founded by John Wright & John Stephenson)
  - National Mortgage and Agency Company of New Zealand, which had taken over Russell Le Cren and Company, and Russell Ritchie and Company and Murray Roberts & Co
    - Levin & Co 1896
    - Wairarapa Farmer's Co-operative Association
  - Dalgety Crown 1983 bought by Wrightson NMA 1986
    - Dalgety New Zealand Loan 1962
      - New Zealand Loan and Mercantile Agency Company
      - Dalgety New Zealand
    - Crown Consolidated merged with Dalgety 1983
- Pyne Gould Guinness
  - Pyne & Co. Founded by FH Pyne.
  - Gould Beaumont & Co. founded in 1851 by Joseph Gould, George Gould and John Beaumont
  - Guinness & Le Cren Ltd, founded in 1890 by Edwin Rowland Guinness and Ernest Alfred le Cren
  - Reid Farmers merged with PGG 2001
- Williams & Kettle, bought by Wrightson 2005

In 2011 PGG Wrightson sold its finance division to Heartland Building Society to create a single larger rural financing organisation.

In August 2018, it was announced that PGG had agreed to sell their Seeds business, PGW Seeds, to Danish company DLF Seeds for NZD $421 million, with the deal being finalised in early 2019. PGG Wrightson Seeds Holdings has operations in New Zealand, Australia, and South America. Under the deal, PGW and PGW Seeds will enter into a long-term distribution agreement for seed and grain. PGW will grant a brand licence to PGW Seeds for the continued use of the PGG Wrightson Seeds brand.

In late 2018, the majority shareholder of PGW, the Chinese-owned Agria Corporation, was found guilty of fraudulent accounting by the United States Securities and Exchange Commission. Agria was subsequently ordered by the Overseas Investment Office to sell down its majority shareholding in PGW to 46.5%.

== PGG Wrightson Country Cup ==
The PGG Wrightson Country Cup is the Premier Competition over the region known as the Canterbury Country. The region includes clubs from the Ellesmere and North Canterbury Sub-Unions and the Mid Canterbury Rugby Football Union.

== Notable people ==
- Craig Norgate: Chairman of PGG Wrightson (and predecessor businesses) (2004–2009)
- Tim Miles: CEO of PGG Wrightson (2008–2010) and former Vodafone UK CEO
- George Gould: CEO of PGG Wrightson (2010–2013)
- Sir John Anderson: Chairman of PGG Wrightson (2010–2013)
