= Donald Reid (politician, born 1855) =

New Zealand politician (1855–1920)

Donald Reid (1855 – 25 August 1920) was a Dunedin, New Zealand solicitor and partner in his father's stock and station agency. For two consecutive terms he was an independent conservative Member of Parliament in New Zealand. His father had represented the same electorate for three terms a generation earlier.

== Early life ==
Eldest son of Donald Reid and his wife born Frances Barr, he was their first child and was born at Caversham 15 October 1855 where his 22-year-old Scots-born father had purchased his first block of land two years before. The next year they moved to Salisbury, North Taieri.

== The Law and the stock & station agency ==
Educated at North Taieri District School Donald Reid junior studied law while an articled clerk with Dunedin's Smith, Anderson & Co. He was admitted as a barrister and solicitor in 1879 while still at Smith, Anderson & Co. A year later he went out on his own and, until 1888, practised as a solicitor with his brother, J S Reid (1857–1894), on his own account.

Then he entered as a partner in his father's stock and station agency business, Donald Reid & Co, but after almost ten years retired from that in 1897 to resume practice as a solicitor. He was joined in this new practice in 1900 by partner P S K Macassey — Reid & Macassey — and later by a Mr Bundle. When he died in 1920 his law partnership was known as Reid & Lemon.

He remained a director of Donald Reid & Co until his death.

== Economics ==
Donald Reid junior had an interest in the study of economics and was expert in some branches. He was secretary of the New Zealand Bimetallic League a movement related to international currencies, the gold standard and the re-monetisation of silver. He was president of the Roslyn branch of the Workers Educational Association.

== Otago Early Settlers Association ==
He succeeded his father as president.

== Political career ==
New Zealand Parliament
Years	Term	Electorate	Party
1902–1905	15th	Taieri	Independent
1905–1908	16th	Taieri	Independent

Donald Reid junior represented the Taieri electorate from 1902 to 1908, when he retired.

== Death ==
On the afternoon of Wednesday 25 August 1920 Reid came in from watching the university students' Capping Carnival procession, had his lunch, returned to his practice and suddenly died in his clerk's office He was near the end of his 65th year. Married in 1906 he was survived by his wife, born Catherine McMillan, and their two young sons.

At his memorial service in Knox Church, Dunedin led by a former minister of that church it was noted amongst his many other attributes that "Otago University and Columba College lost a good friend by his death" Reid was a Deacon of Knox Church.

Parliament adjourned as a mark of respect on 31 August 1920.

New Zealand Parliament
Preceded by Walter Carncross	Member of Parliament for Taieri; 1902–1908	Succeeded by Thomas Mackenzie
