= John Roberts (mayor) =

New Zealand leading businessman (1845–1934)

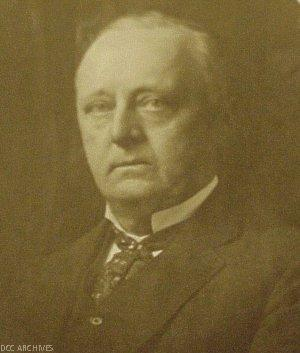
John Roberts, Mayor of Dunedin

Sir John Roberts CMG (October 1845 – 13 September 1934) founder and managing partner of Murray Roberts & Co was a New Zealand businessman and runholder of the last quarter of the 19th century and the first quarter of the following century.

He brought his family woollen business to New Zealand initially by opening a Dunedin branch of Melbourne's (and Galashiels') Sanderson Murray following that in 1873 by floating a public company to buy Mosgiel Woollen Mill established two years earlier by Arthur J Burns. He was appointed first chairman of its owners at the age of 28 and remained chairman until he died. Founder A J Burns, a grand-nephew of the great poet, was also a director.

By this time Sanderson had withdrawn from the partnership and his place had been taken by young William Murray who was two years younger than Roberts. At the end of the 19th century Murray Roberts was New Zealand's second largest wool exporter and Sanderson Murray & Co in London was ranked as the third largest importer of wool in the United Kingdom.

Roberts also found time to serve his community as Mayor of Dunedin and earlier as a member of the Otago Provincial Council.

== Scotland ==
John Roberts was born in October 1845 in Selkirk Scotland the fourth son of a woollen mill owner, George Roberts, for many years provost of that town and his wife Agnes Fowler. He was educated at Cheltenham Grammar School, the Edinburgh Academy and at The Edinburgh Institution, Queen Street. On leaving school in 1862 Roberts entered his father's Selkirk firm, George Roberts & Co. Two years later he arrived in Melbourne where he was employed in station management and business in the Australian branch of Galashiels wool merchants John Sanderson & Co with which he had close family connections. In 1868 with four years experience in Australia he was sent to open a New Zealand branch in Dunedin.

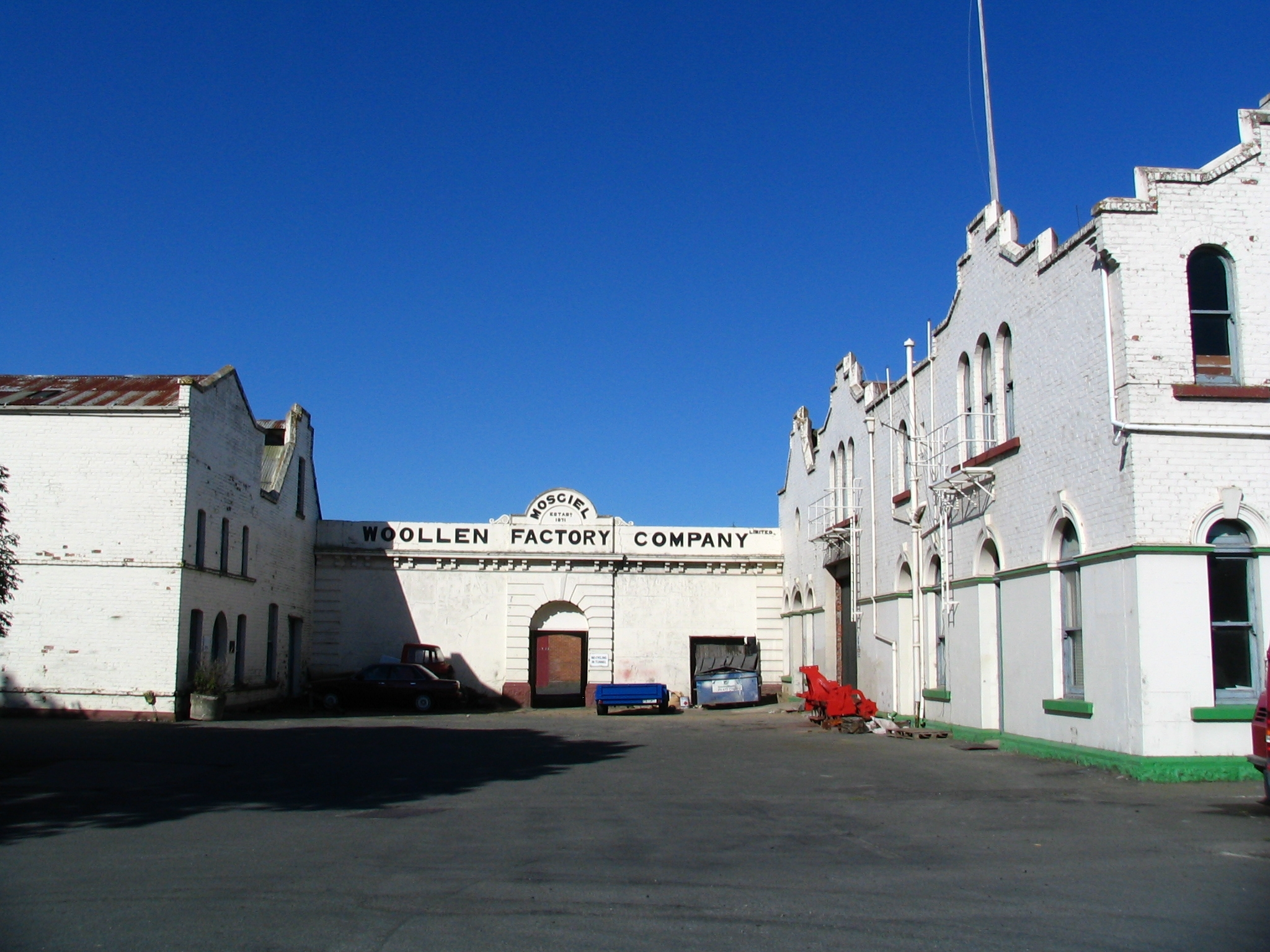
Part of Mosgiel Woollen's mill 2010

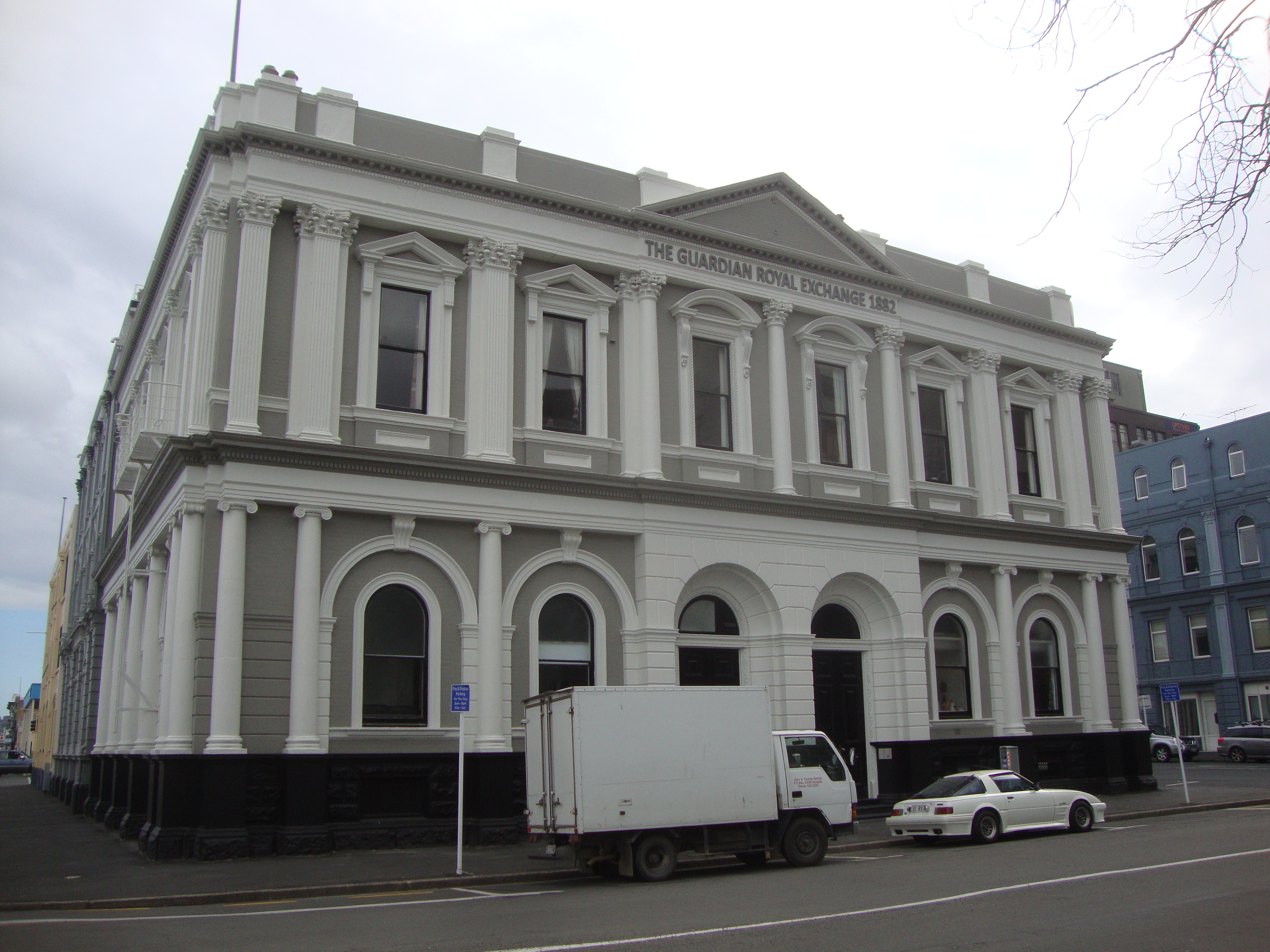
Dunedin's Guardian Royal Exchange building. From 1881 to 1962 Murray Roberts to the left of the entrance, Stock Exchange and Chamber of Commerce to the right. Basement occupied by Murray Roberts

== Career in New Zealand ==
On 26 January 1870, he married Louisa Jane, second daughter of the surveyor who laid out Dunedin, Charles Kettle, and they had at least nine children.

As a Stock and station agent Sir John Roberts took a keen interest in agricultural and pastoral matters and was a leading promoter and a life governor of the Otago Agricultural and Pastoral Association. In addition to his interest in Mosgiel Woollen he was an original director and for many years chairman of New Zealand's pioneer refrigerated meat export business founded in 1881, New Zealand Refrigerating Company Limited.

He was deputy chairman of Union Steamship Company, when he retired in 1914 the biggest shipping line in the southern hemisphere. For two years he was a director of Colonial Bank of New Zealand from which he retired in 1891 before it was saved and swallowed during an 1895 crisis by the Bank of New Zealand.

As well as serving as Dunedin's mayor (1889–1890), Roberts' participation in the life of the community included service in these public institutions: president of the Dunedin Chamber of Commerce, the Otago University committee including chairman of its finance committee, representing Kaikorai in the Otago Provincial Council from June 1873 until its abolition in October 1876 and representing Deep Stream riding in the Taieri County Council. For his presidency of the 1889 Dunedin Exhibition he was awarded a companionship of the Order of St Michael and St George in the 1891 New Year Honours.

He was appointed a Knight Bachelor in the 1920 King's Birthday Honours. The freedom of his native town Selkirk was conferred on him in 1932. He died in Dunedin on 13 September 1934 at age 88. His wife had died in 1922.

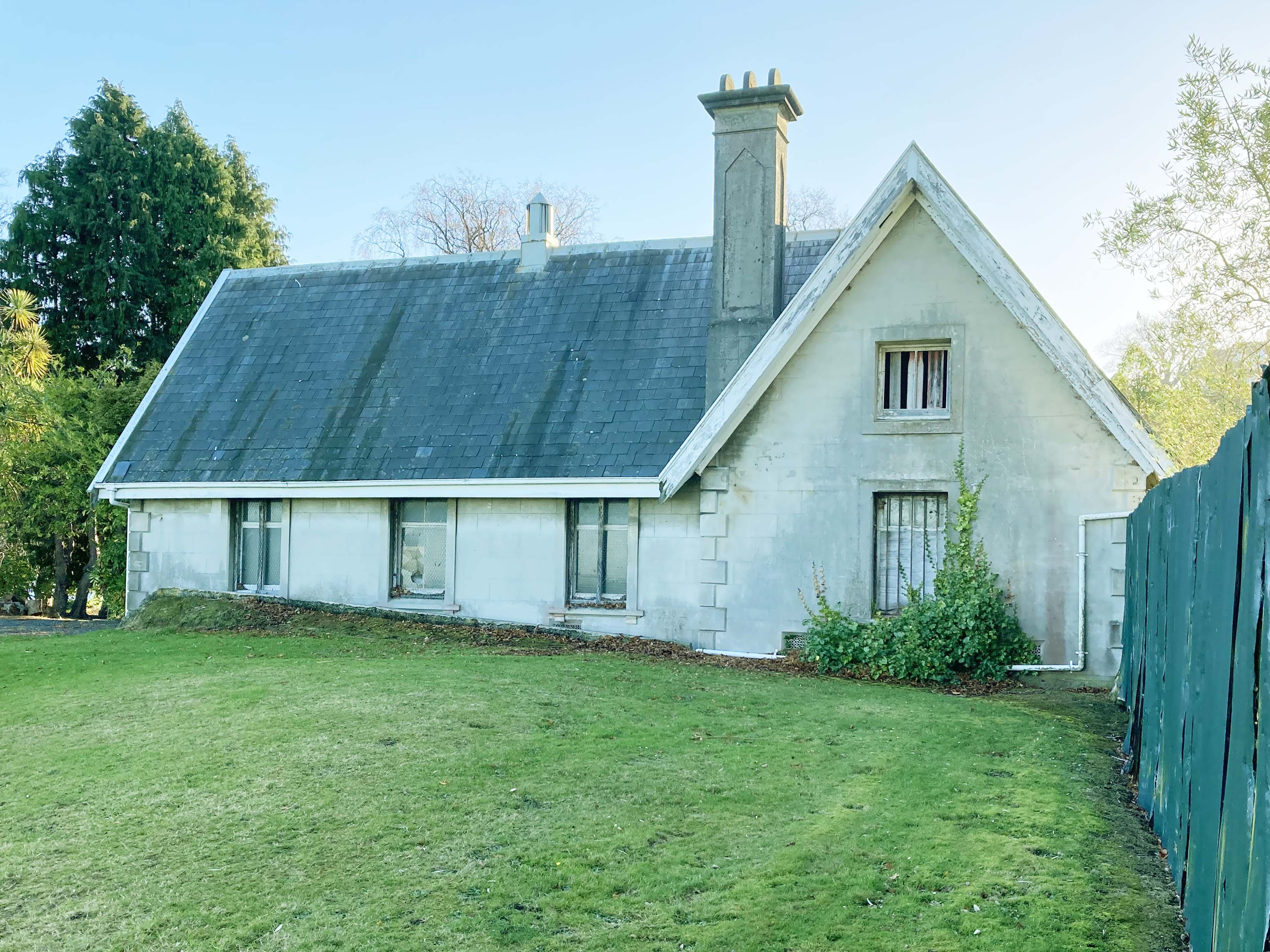
The stables of Littlebourne House are all that survive of the mansion.

== Legacy ==
When Roberts died he left his 30-room mansion Littlebourne House, set in 4 acres of land, to the city for the use of the Governor-General, but the Government declined to furnish it, and the Governor-General never used it. The property was used by the military during the Second World War, and as a student hostel, before being demolished in 1949. The site is now Roberts Park sports ground.

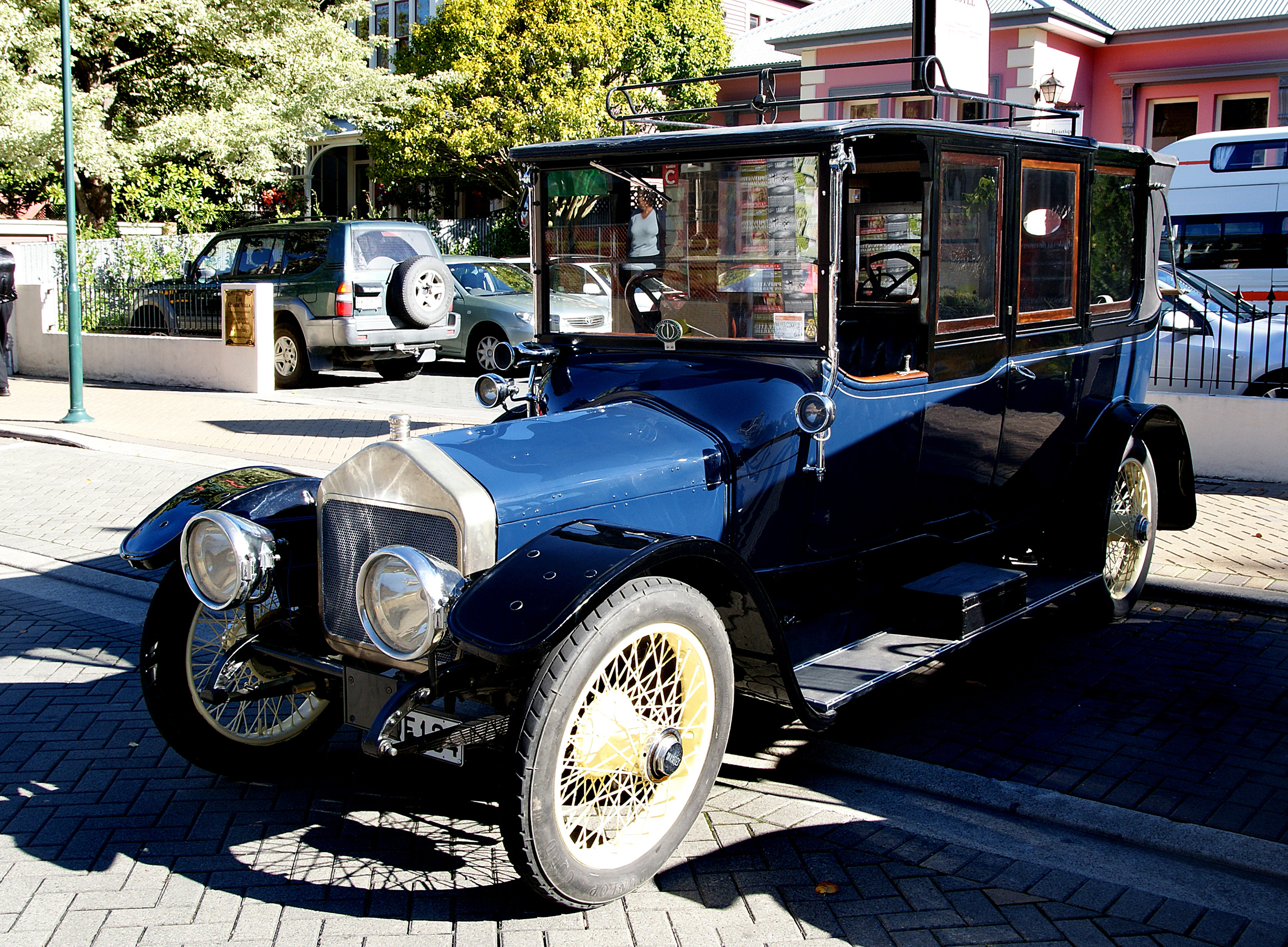
Sir John's 1914 Wolseley landaulette

In 2016, Roberts was posthumously inducted into the New Zealand Business Hall of Fame.
