= Scott Willis (politician) =

New Zealand politician

Scott Willis MP
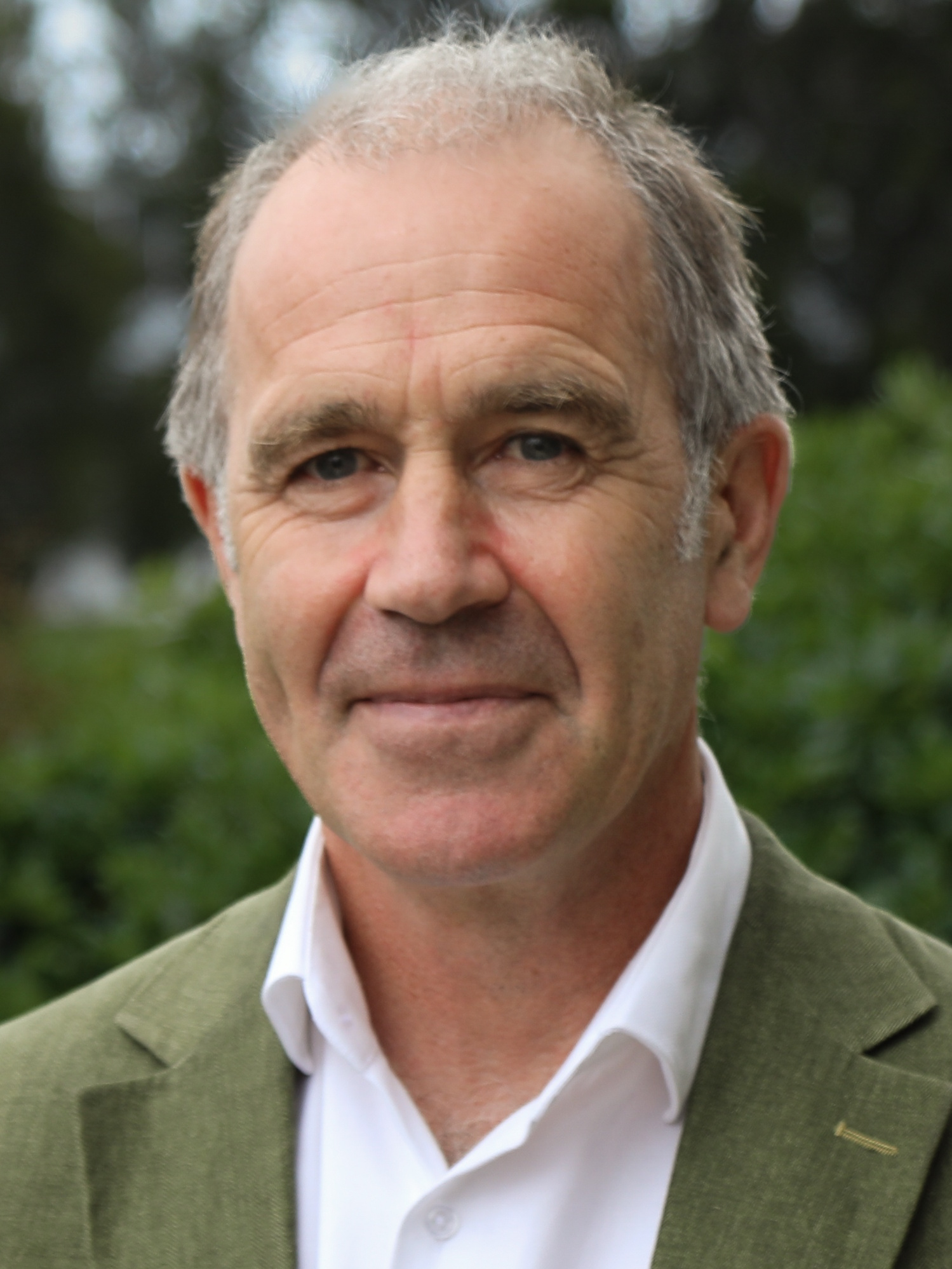
- Willis in 2026

Member of the New Zealand Parliament for Green party list
- Incumbent
- Assumed office 14 October 2023

Personal details
- Born: 1969 or 1970 (age 55–56) Dunedin, New Zealand
- Party: Green
- Willis' voice recorded July 2024

Scott Matthew Willis is a New Zealand energy analyst and politician, representing the Green Party of Aotearoa New Zealand as a Member of Parliament since the 2023 New Zealand general election.

== Early life ==
Willis was born in Dunedin and grew up on a farm in Otago. He attended the University of Otago from the age of 17 in 1987, and then worked on orchards and farms in the Cévennes region of France. Willis later interned at the European Parliament. He has worked as a consultant on energy resilience, and as an energy analyst. As general manager of Blueskin Energy Ltd, Willis was involved in attempts to get wind turbines in Blueskin Bay, and in the building of New Zealand's first climate-safe house in 2020. He has been involved with a trust working on peer-to-peer energy sharing, and insulating houses.

== Political career ==
New Zealand Parliament
Years	Term	Electorate	List	Party
2023–2026	54th	List	12	Green
2026–present	54th	List	15	Green

Willis contested the Taieri electorate in the 2020 election, when he came third to Labour MP Ingrid Leary and National Party candidate Liam Kernaghan, with 2207 votes.

Willis stood again for Taieri in the 2023 election. He was twelfth on the national list. At the campaign launch in June, Willis said "We need a strong voice on the hospital build and our health services; for all whānau living in cold, damp mouldy homes; for our tertiary education – our University and Te Pukenga. We need a strong voice and forward thinking for South Dunedin and our rural and energy sectors, for decarbonising to deliver climate justice."

During the 2023 election, Willis received 3,898 votes in Taeiri, coming third to incumbent Ingrid Leary and National Party candidate Matthew French. Despite not winning Taieri, Willis entered Parliament on the Green Party list.

In late November 2023, Willis assumed the Green Party's energy, regional development, rural communities and Dunedin Issues spokesperson portfolios.

During the 2026 New Zealand general election, Willis was ranked 15th on the Green Party list. He contested the Taieri electorate. Based on preliminary results, Willis came fourth place in the Taieri contest, gaining 3,271 votes. He was re-elected to Parliament on the Green Party list.

== Views and positions ==
=== Climate change mitigation ===
Willis has advocated environmentally-friendly water management and "blue-green" urban design policies including not building on flood-prone lands and using permeable surfaces to mitigate climate change and flood risk.

During the 2022 Dunedin local elections, Willis advocated degrowth policies in order to combat the effects of climate change. He has also supported the "pedestrianisation" of George Street in Dunedin.

=== Agriculture ===
Willis has advocated sustainable agriculture and organic farming as alternatives to intensive agriculture and horticulture.

=== Economy ===
Willis has advocated transitioning towards a low carbon economy in order to address the impact of climate change and pollution.

=== Transportation ===
In September 2023, Willis expressed support for the reintroduction of passenger rail in the South Island.
