= Murray Roberts & Co =

Former owner of a New Zealand stock and station agency

Murray Roberts & Co Limited
- Company type: private company
- Industry: Stock and station agency
- Founded: 1867 in Dunedin, New Zealand
- Founder: John Roberts
- Defunct: 30 June 1961
- Fate: Purchased by National Mortgage & Agency Company
- Headquarters: Wellington, New Zealand
- Area served: New Zealand, excluding Canterbury and the upperNorth Island
- Key people: John Roberts, Alfred Henry Miles
- Products: Pastoral property investment and development; services to agricultural and pastoral producers

Murray Roberts & Co Limited owned a stock and station agency in New Zealand. For a time, it was New Zealand's largest wool exporter. Its business began in Green Island, Dunedin as a fellmongery owned by the Melbourne partners. Under direction of young John Roberts from 1867, it made very substantial investments in rural property in Otago and Hawke's Bay and spread as a stock and station agency through Otago and Southland and the lower half of the North Island.

Ownership was transferred to a newly incorporated limited liability company in 1910. Until then it had been owned by a complicated network of partners with its core in Scotland, England, and Dunedin. Additional different subsidiary partnerships in different regions were set up to include local management.

Murray Roberts & Co was purchased in 1961 by another Dunedin-based business, National Mortgage & Agency Company. Becoming fully integrated with the operations of National Mortgage it lost most of its separate identity in 1963 though some operations continued until 1965.

== Origin ==
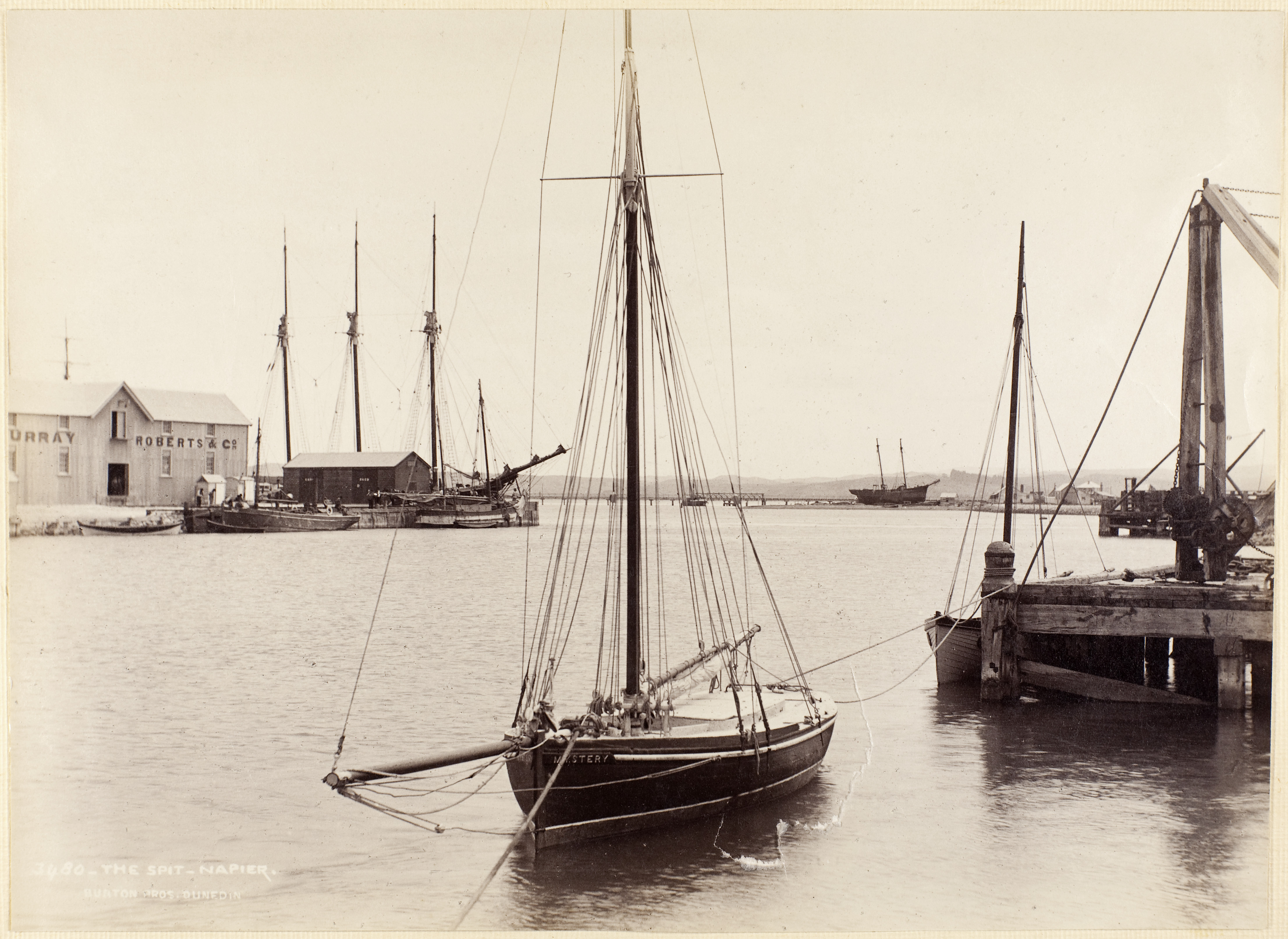
Murray Roberts store in the 1880s The Spit, Port Ahuriri, Napier

George Roberts, a woollen manufacturer of Selkirk, Scotland sent his 19-year-old fourth son, John, to Melbourne, Australia in 1864 to join young John Sanderson in a new colonial venture with the Sanderson and Murray families from nearby Galashiels. Sanderson Murray & Co owned a very substantial woolbrokers and import-export merchants in Gresham Street, London. John was required by his father to learn the colonial business, buy wool supplies and sell Selkirk's high quality products. Over two years he worked on two runs, the second belonging to young John Sanderson. Sanderson did not pay him for his twelve months' work.

George Roberts wanted his own supply of wool. A new land act restricted the properties young Roberts could buy in Victoria and run for himself, and at his father's suggestion in 1867 he crossed to Dunedin where there was no restriction on buying available land. Sanderson Murray & Co had a small fellmongery at Green Island. Unwilling Roberts and his younger brother were required nevertheless to take charge. The fellmongery never prospered but it was the first centre of Murray Roberts' operations.

== Murray Roberts & Co ==
A partnership was formed in June 1868 with two-thirds owned by Sanderson Murray & Co and one-third by John Roberts, using money from his father. An office and store were bought in Stafford Street, Dunedin, and the business was established as wool and skin merchants, scourers, classers, fellmongers and general merchants. In 1870 Roberts married Dunedin's Louisa Kettle, daughter of city surveyor Charles Kettle. Louisa's brother Nathaniel worked for Murray Roberts & Co and later established the stock and station agency Williams & Kettle.

Murray Roberts & Co was in the early years more a land investment and station management business, and did not lend to small Central Otago farmers, though later that changed.

There were continuing difficulties with funds and approvals from Sanderson Murray & Co in London. London was now under the control of John Sanderson, the young man of the same age who had failed to pay Roberts for a year's work on his run in Victoria. In 1882 John Roberts, now 37, decided to retire from daily involvement. However he seemed unable to find a suitable replacement, however, and in the end stayed on until 1896 when, diagnosed with a thyroid condition, he handed day-to-day responsibilities to his eldest son.

Around 1900 policies changed, wool auctioneering began and livestock activities developed. Stock agents were hired for the lower part of the North Island. From 1910 a full range of stock and station agency services were offered.

== Murray Roberts & Co ==
Murray Roberts & Co Limited was incorporated 1910, replacing the many and varied partnerships. Ownership became: Murray family 31%, Roberts family 31%, A H Miles 31%, and 7% held by G M Morris.

The capital was increased from time to time by substantial issues of new shares to managers, diluting the ownership of the Murray and Roberts families. s diluting the ownership of the Murray and Roberts families.

The capital was increased from time to time by substantial issues of new shares to managers diluting the ownership of the Murray and Roberts families

Chairmen
1910–1931 Sir John Roberts (1845–1934)
1932–1941 Alfred Henry Miles (1852–1941)
1941–1961 Sir Alex Roberts KBE (1883–1961)

== Business ==
=== Wool ===
When John Roberts' father, the Scots manufacturer of woollen materials, sent him to New Zealand, he had in mind the purchase of a pastoral run to breed sheep with wool to his own requirements. His own wool could be shipped directly to Scotland without the expense of middle-men. The policy of crossbreeding on Murray Roberts' stations to establish the desired qualities of the wool led to the Corriedale breed. The first major investment in pastoral activities was Lauder station in 1868.

In 1871 Murray Roberts & Co had begun buying wool on commission for North American importers and supplying from their own pastoral properties. New Zealand prices for wool were so low it led in 1873 to young John Roberts' establishment of the Mosgiel Woollen Mill. Because all wool dealings were on commission, the price of wool directly affected the profits of Murray Roberts & Co. The partnership began wool auctioneering in 1897 in Wellington, and their Hawkes Bay operation followed in 1905. The South Island operation continued to buy on commission for its American and British clients right through until 1961.

In the North Island the wool operations were quite different. Murray Roberts sold at local auctions on behalf of their farmer clients. By 1960 the Wellington branch was offering 20,000 bales a year and Hawkes Bay 24,000 a year on behalf of their clients.

=== Livestock ===
As with lending to Otago farmers that were not in a very substantial way of business Murray Roberts & Co were not interested in livestock dealing. Again, this changed in the early 20th century in both Southland and the North Island, and Murray Roberts bought shares in sale yards in their various territories as they built their branch network.

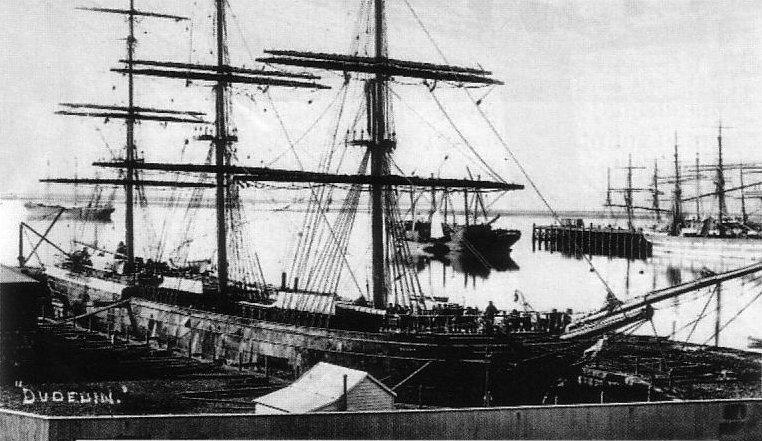
SS Dunedin loading, Port Chalmers 1882

=== Refrigeration ===
Murray Roberts & Co provided part of the cargo of the Dunedin on New Zealand's first successful shipment of frozen meat, 349 sheep, in 1882.

=== Merchandise ===
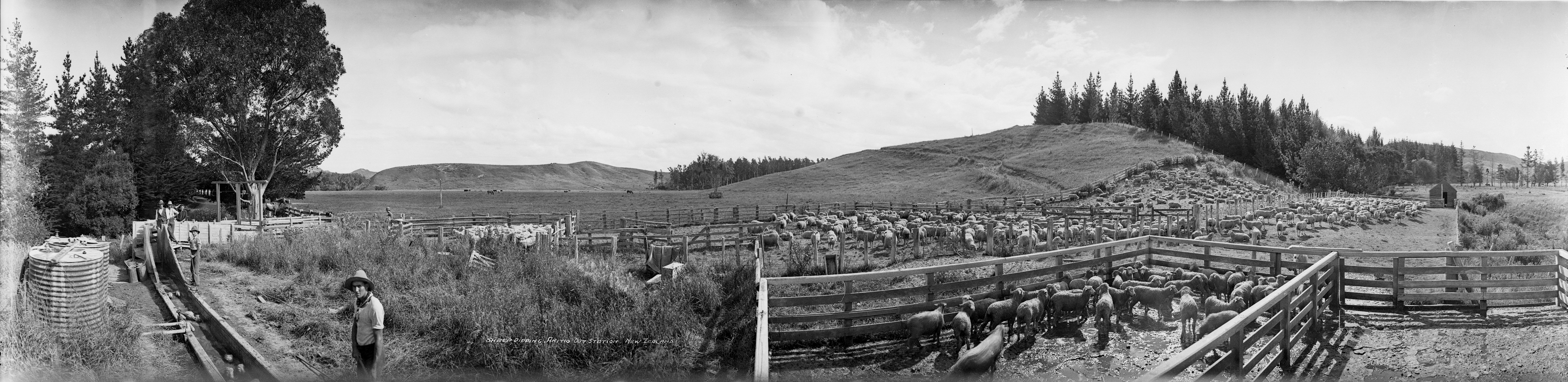
Dipping sheep

Merchandise traded by the company included liquor, ERG car batteries, and India tyres (from Scotland), wholesale grocery for clients and for retailers in large rural towns, and general farm requirements such as fencing wire and Coopers sheep dip.

=== Agencies ===
Agencies provided substantial income, among them the Shaw Savill loading agency, the North British & Mercantile Insurance fire and general insurance, and the British & Foreign Marine Insurance Company.

=== Grain and seeds merchants ===
A seed dressing operation was also part of the company's business.

== Wartime bulk buying contracts ==
The period of World War I gave a time of stability to New Zealand's agriculture and pastoral sector through bulk buying contracts between the New Zealand and British governments at good prices (set by the British government with the local government). The contracts for frozen meat ended on 30 June 1920 and the wool contract expired the same June. The British government was anxious to have it all shipped to England by November 1920 and growers were faced by free markets. The end of this comfortable co-relationship was followed immediately by a postwar slump and many in the industry suffered major financial difficulties. Though this slump proved brief, it was followed very soon after by other similar short sharp events.

== Branches ==
=== Wellington ===
In 1875, a partnership was formed for a Wellington branch and named Murray, Common and Company. Charles Cairns Murray and William Common were the local partners. A Napier office was opened in 1877, then Gisborne was added the following year. After a dispute Common left the Wellington partnership, taking the Gisborne business, which he operated himself.

The headquarters were moved from Dunedin to Wellington in 1910, at the time of incorporation of the limited liability company. A wool store was built in Thorndon Quay in 1907, and another across the road on reclaimed land in 1917, where the wool store operation remained until it moved to Seaview in the 1960s.

Agencies were opened in Masterton in 1913, and after World War I more followed at Feilding, Dannevirke, and Hāwera. The Masterton agency took the first steps into livestock activities previously passed to Levin & Co. All these branches closed in the Great Depression of the 1930s, though there was a revival in 1934 with the branch at Wanganui extending to include an office at Taihape. In 1961 Masterton opened a Martinborough office.

=== Invercargill ===
A looser arrangement was also made in 1878 for Invercargill. It was broken up in 1892, as it proved to be only moderately successful. In 1923 a new agency was established in Invercargill.

=== Dunedin ===
Dunedin became a branch of the new incorporation in 1910 when the headquarters of Murray Robert & Co moved to Wellington, and an agency was set up in Gore for merchandise items. Though it was where the business was founded, Dunedin was always a modestly sized operation, mainly because it centred on the involvement in the stations and Stronach Morris — a company in which Murray Roberts & Co had an interest — handled all the Murray Roberts & Co clients' wool clip. The original fellmongery continued but, never very profitable, it was finally closed in 1915 and the buildings were sold in 1917.

=== Hawke's Bay ===
Established in Napier 1877 as an agency from Wellington, it became the principal and most profitable region for Murray Roberts & Co. Further expansion took place in 1887 with an office in Hastings and again in 1913 when an agent was set up in Waipukurau.

In 1884 a quarter share in Richardson & Co was acquired. Richardson was operating two coastal steamers, SS Fairy and SS Weka, and two lighters. Further steamers were added as the company grew: SS Tuna in 1885, SS Kahu (1886), SS Fanny (1890), and SS Toroa (1900). Murray Roberts & Co sold it share in Richardson & Co in 1909.

During the 1950s the Hawkes Bay branch took over from Wellington as Murray Roberts & Co's most profitable branch. By the end of the 1950s its profits were equal to the profits of all the other branches combined.

National Mortgage & Agency Company was considered to be weak in the Hawke's Bay region, and Murray Roberts & Co's Hawkes Bay operation was a likely major reason for the takeover.

=== Gisborne ===
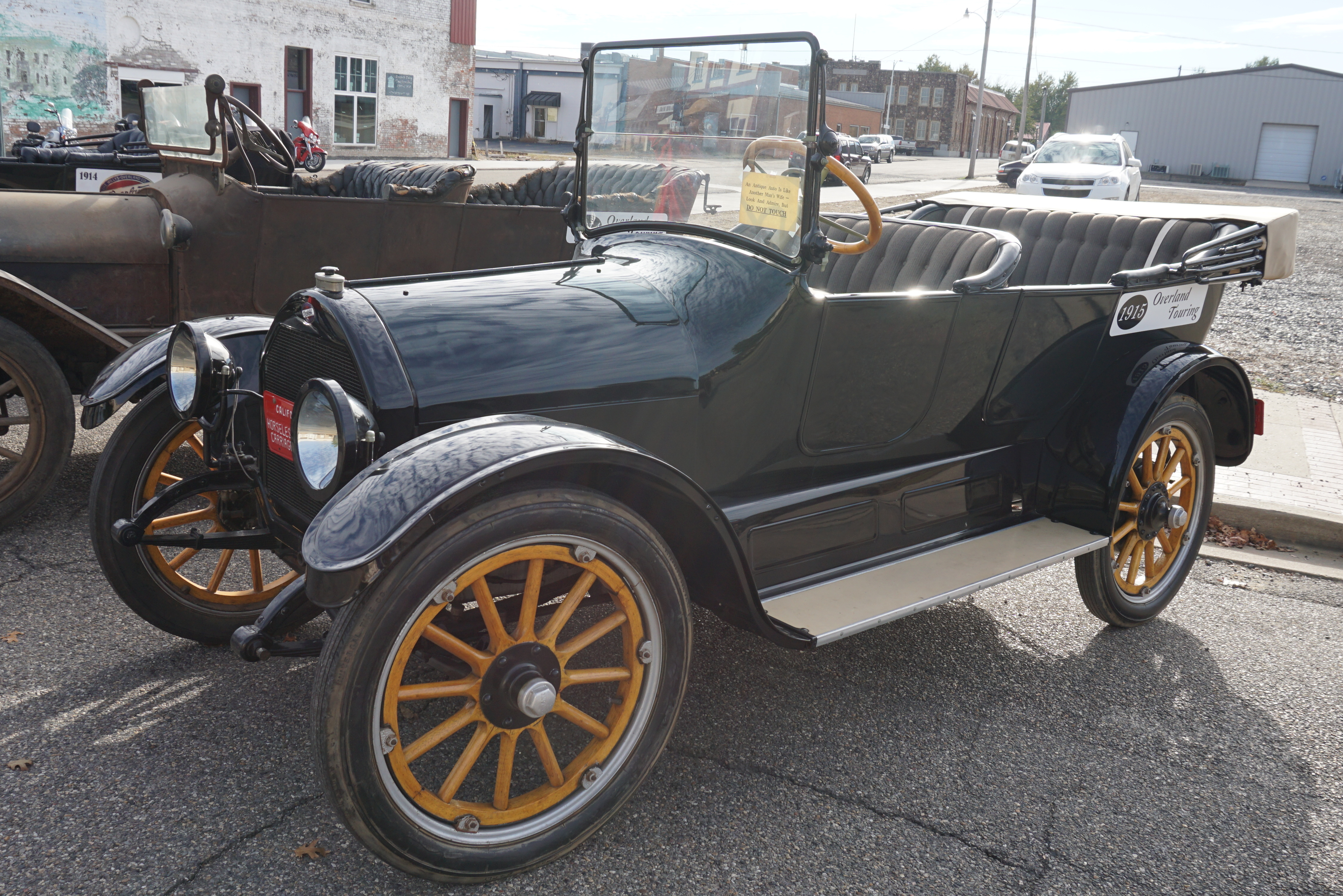
1915 Overland car

A Poverty Bay branch was set up in 1905. For the first ten years all the business was in merchandising. There were some meat exports, but little wool was handled. With the advent of the First World War the quantity of wool handled rose abruptly, in part because of the bulk buying contracts. The branch also won a fat stock agency with meat export company Thos Borthwick & Sons. They were provided with an Overland car and a Humber motorcycle. A horse and buggy was retained. A postwar slump in 1920 reduced activity and business did not recover during the 1920s or in the following Great Depression. Recovery did begin in 1937 and the early 1950s was a period of prosperity.

=== Wanganui ===
Wanganui branch was established in 1924. Its first ten years were not consistently profitable and the staff numbers remained at just three. The branch's main growth began after World War II.

== Stronach Morris & Co ==
=== Otago and Southland ===
In 1905 Sir John Roberts and his family bought 62.5 per cent of the capital of a new company, Stronach Morris & Co, incorporated to own a well-established stock and station agency and wool broking business of the same name. Stronach Morris already held agencies in Middlemarch, Tapanui, Balclutha, and Waikouaiti, with a share in the Wyndham saleyards. The bulk of their business was in Otago, but there was a strong link with Southland. The wool trade and livestock were new areas for Murray Roberts. After Murray Roberts bought into the business, growth was initially slow. An agency opened in Cromwell in 1919 then, following a resurgence in 1937, another agency in the Maniototo and another in Lawrence in 1949. This represented an unusually wide network for a Dunedin-based stock and station agency. Stronach Morris auctioned livestock from Burnside and also in Cromwell, Omakau, Alexandra, Waipiata, Owhiro, Otago, Evansdale and Wyndham.

Rabbit skin sales ended in 1955. Usually more than 100 tons of skins were sold by Stronach Morris's public auction every fortnight. New laws had been enacted to remove any possible profit motive that might encourage allowing rabbits to breed. Stronach Morris competed directly with Murray Roberts & Co in merchandise. The wool of Murray Roberts & Co clients was sold by Stronach Morris and wool and livestock activities in Otago were left to Stronach aside from Murray Roberts & Co's buying on commission for their own long-established overseas clients. By the time of the purchase by NMA Murray Roberts owned all but 17% of Stronach Morris & Co.

== Stations ==
=== Pastoral leases ===
Murray Roberts & Co as pastoral investors and sheep breeders shared in partnerships which held these properties:

Otago

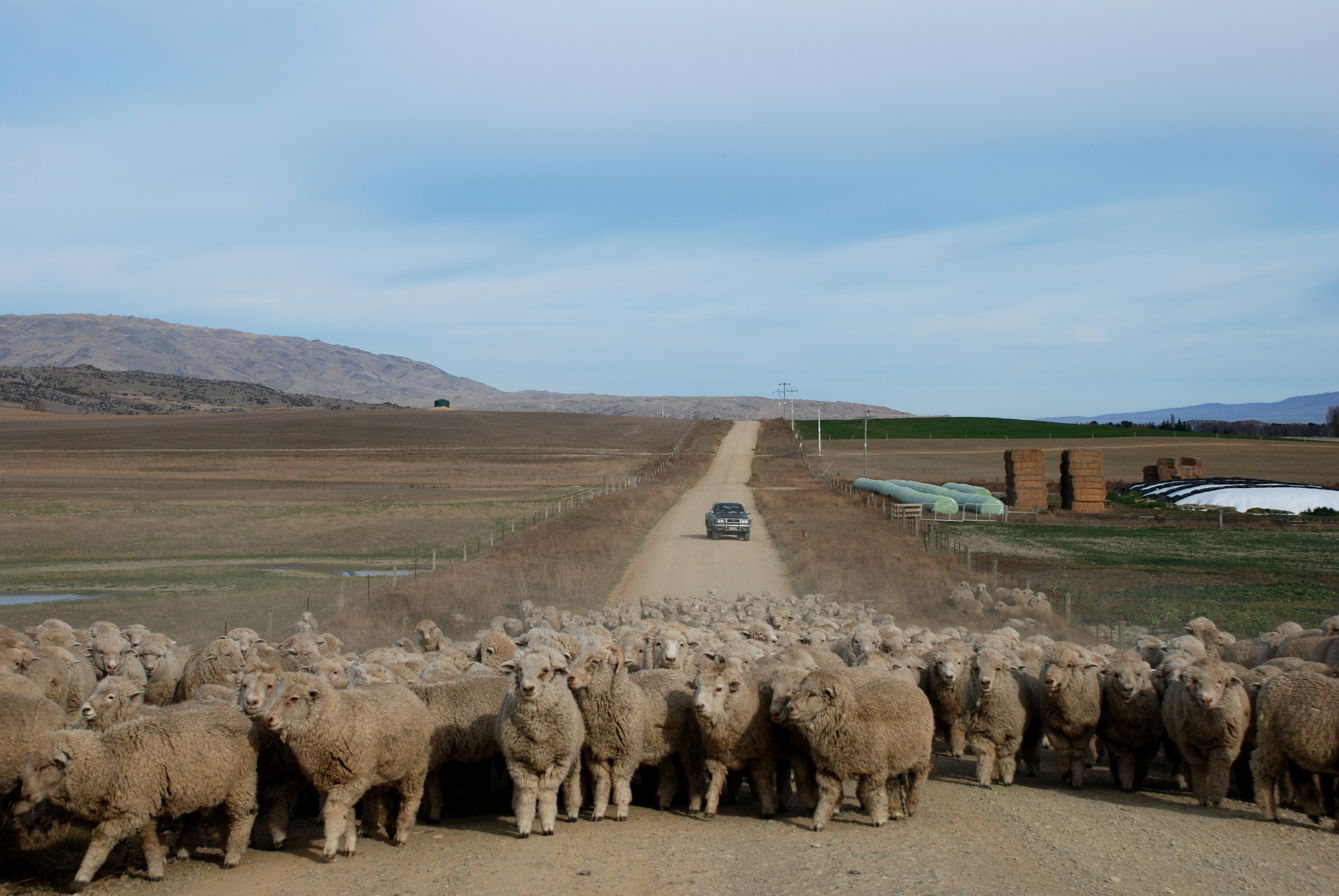
Patearoa

ca 1868 Lauder Station. A lease of 45,000 acres with a further 1,000 acres of freehold sold 1882 to Ross & Glendining, Lauder
1872 Strath Taieri Station renamed Gladbrook station taken over on own account by John Roberts. Middlemarch:
1873 Patearoa Station Patearoa
ca 1874 Henley Station, Henley
1877 Carterhope near Balclutha
1878 Ringway Station Otautau
1880s Cottesbrook near Middlemarch
Hawkes Bay

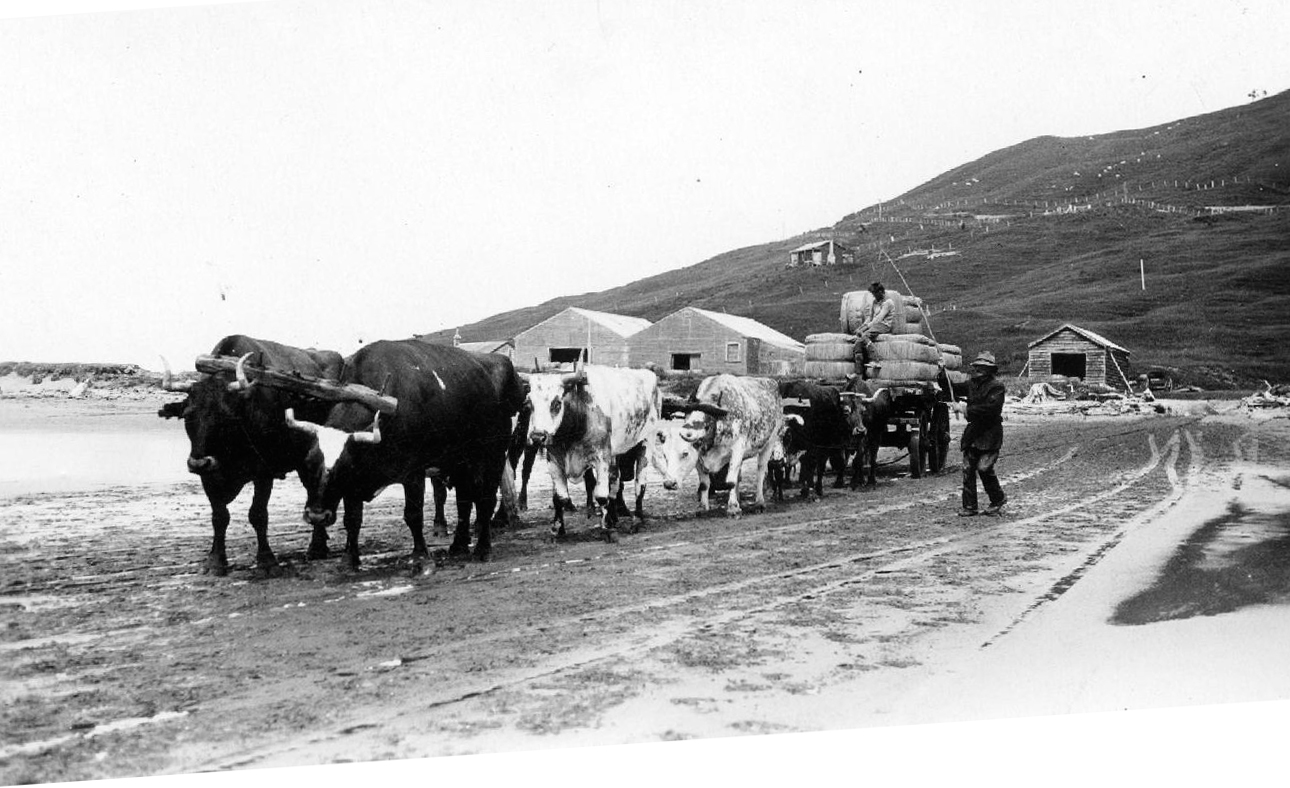
Shipping wool at Ākitio

1878 Tautane Herbertville
1880 Te Putere and Putere no. 1 Wairoa
1880 (circa) Hawkestone Puketitiri
1880 Clive Grange Clive
1880s Mangatutu Raukawa
1880s Marainanga (Ākitio South) auctioned in 1908 in 22 blocks

Having played a major part in developing pastoral land in Otago and Hawkes Bay, the sale of the 36,600 acres of Marainanga marked the last of Murray Roberts & Co pastoral holdings, which had at one time reached 200,000 acres.

== National Mortgage & Agency Company ==
After the integration of Murray Roberts & Co with its new owner, the firm's name remained in use for some years. Hawkes Bay and Dunedin Murray Roberts branches used the style "NMA Company of N Z Limited trading as Murray Roberts & Co Limited", Wellington and Wanganui used the style "NMA Company of N Z Limited trading as Levin and Murray Roberts".
