= Henry Le Cren =

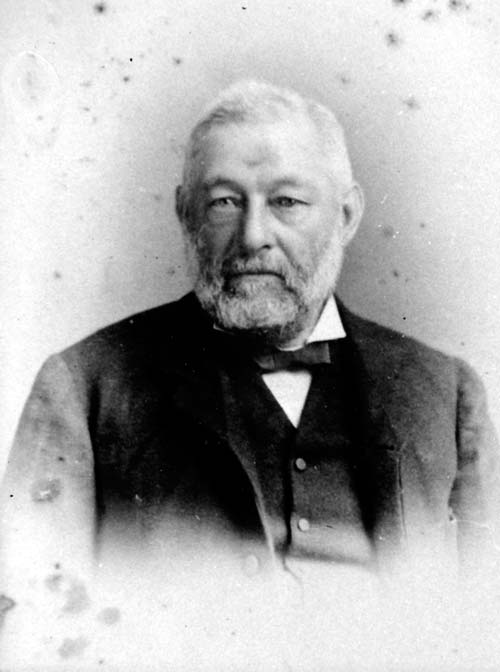
- Henry Le Cren
- Born: Henry John Le Cren; 2 July 1828; London, England
- Died: 20 May 1895 (aged 66); Timaru, New Zealand
- Resting place: Timaru Cemetery
- Known for: merchant stock and station agent Timaru pioneer
- Relatives: Frederic Le Cren (brother)

Henry John Le Cren (2 July 1828 – 20 May 1895) was a New Zealand merchant. Born in London, he was an early settler in Lyttelton and traded both in the port town and central Christchurch. He moved to Timaru in 1858 and is regarded as one of the town's pioneers. Companies owned by him or his eldest son are predecessors to the New Zealand agricultural supply business PGG Wrightson.

== Early life ==
Le Cren was born in London, England and baptised on 3 September 1828. His parents were Henry Le Cren and Emma Ann Le Cren (née Davies). Both his father and his maternal grandfather were French exiles. The family lived in Greenwich, and Henry and his brother Frederic were sent to Christ's Hospital in Horsham in West Sussex for their education. He entered the merchant banking house ″Frühling & Göschen″ (later Anglicised to become Fruhling & Goschen) where he worked alongside George Joachim Goschen who was made a director of the Bank of England at age 25.

== Life in Lyttelton ==
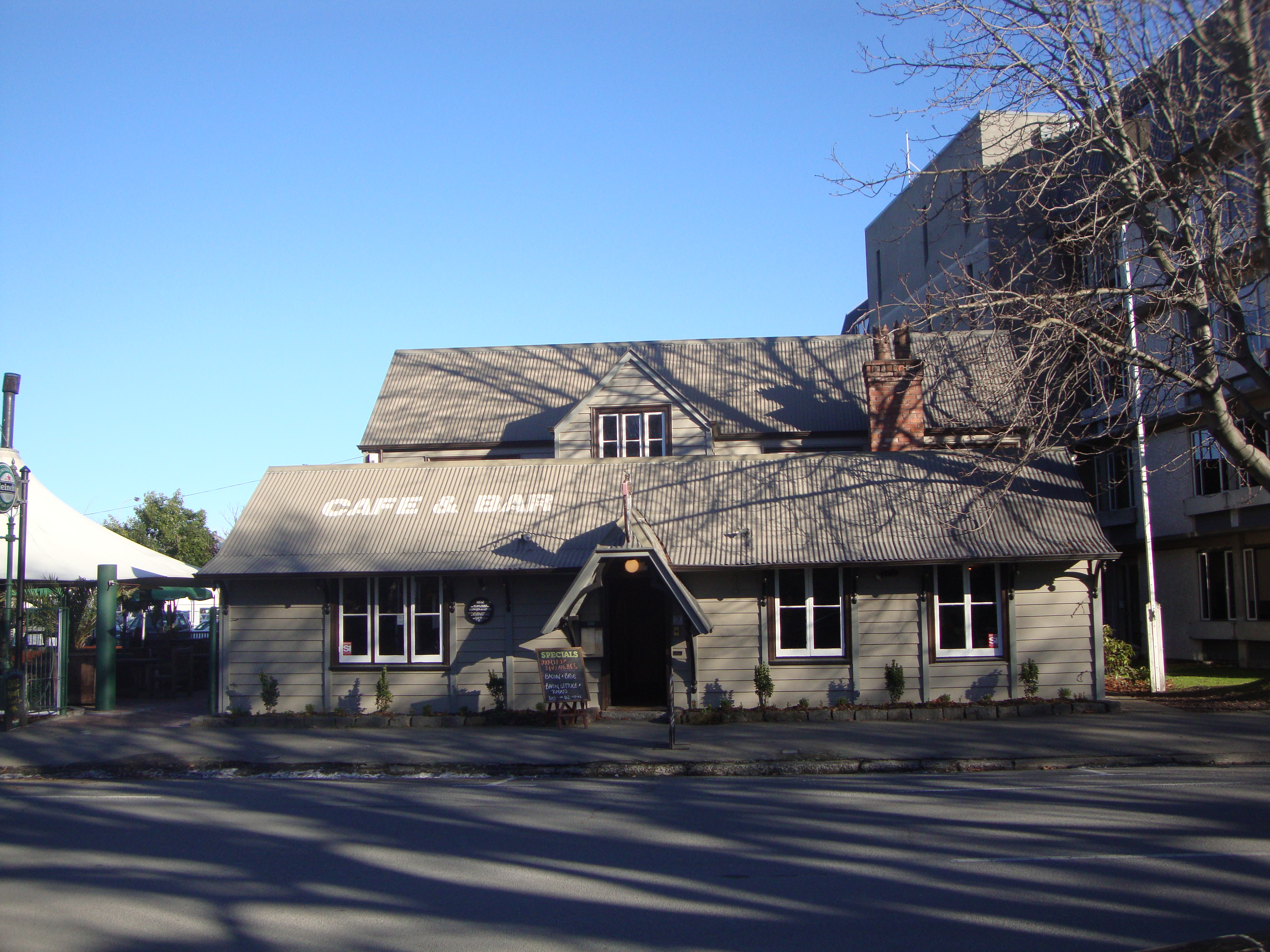
Pegasus Arms in Christchurch, built for Longden and Le Cren in 1852

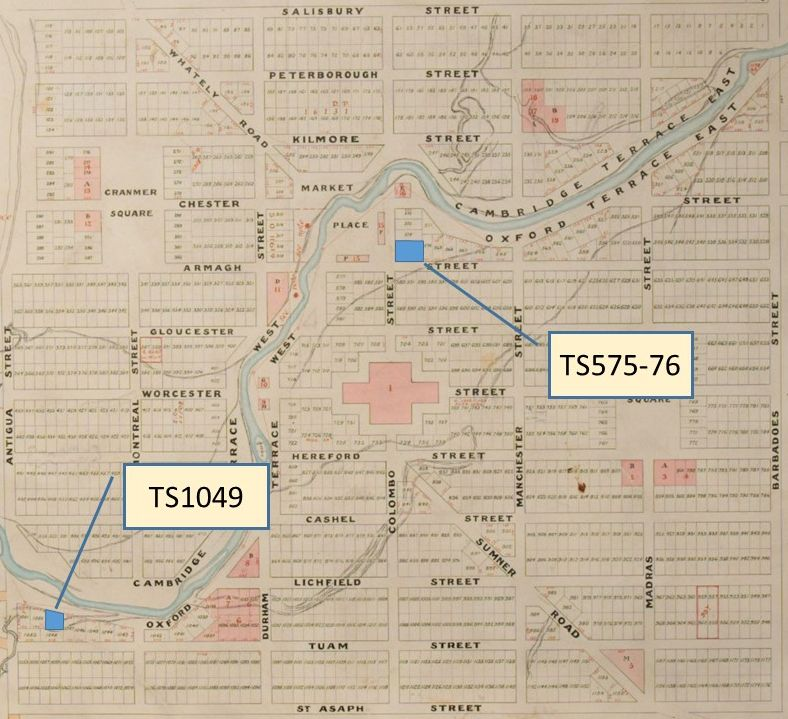
Town sections bought by Longden and Le Cren in central Christchurch

On Goschen's recommendation he was appointed agent in New Zealand for the Canterbury Association. With his cousin, Joseph Longden, he travelled to Lyttelton in New Zealand on the Barbara Gordon. Leaving England in July 1850 it arrived in Auckland on 10 October in Wellington on 23 November and Lyttelton on 15 December, only one day before the first two of the First Four Ships. Henry Tancred was also on that ship. The cousins set up a store on Lyttelton's Norwich Quay and an accommodation agency; the store was a prefabricated iron shed which they had brought with them. Le Cren built a house and jetty in Gollans Bay on RS55 (rural section), the bay between Godley Head and Lyttelton Harbour. Longden and Le Cren bought the adjacent land parcels TS575 and TS576 in Colombo Street facing the Market Place (since renamed Victoria Square) and Market Place became the initial commercial heart of Christchurch. John Foster Swinbourne managed the store on their behalf, and business commenced in January 1952. The cousins bought TS1049 (town section) on Oxford Terrace in central Christchurch on 1 August 1851 where they established another store. They sold the building after one year; it is today a pub (Pegasus Arms) and believed to be the oldest surviving building in the central city. It is registered with Heritage New Zealand as a Category II heritage structure. They would later set up Canterbury's first stock and station agency.

Both Longden and Le Cren had brides sent out for them to marry. Longden's wife, Susannah Andrews "Susan" Haggard, daughter of William Debonuir Haggard of Hammersmith, London, arrived on Lady Nugent on 18 September 1851, and they married three weeks later in Lyttelton. Margaret Fisher Hunt, the daughter of John Hunt of Kennington in London, was supposed to arrive on the Canterbury, which reached Lyttelton on 18 October 1851. Hunt was not on board, but came on the Tasmania on 15 March 1853. Their wedding was held a week later in Lyttelton on 21 March. They were to have seven children.

Longden and Le Cren dissolved their business partnership on 20 January 1854. Swinbourne gained ownership of the Market Place store. In February 1855, Le Cren went into partnership with Edward Hargreaves, and they purchased the Market Place store from Swinbourne.

== Life in Timaru ==
Le Cren was asked by Robert Heaton Rhodes to set up a store in Timaru, where the Rhodes brothers had established large sheep farms. Le Cren sent Captain Cain to establish a suitable landing in the harbour. Le Cren built a homestead, Beverley, overlooking the harbour. When the supply system had become reliable in 1858, his wife moved from Lyttelton to Timaru with their first three children; at the time, there were 16 people living in the vicinity. Le Cren was a benefactor of the Anglican St Mary's Church, which was built in 1861, just in time for their fourth child. The building that replaced the original church in 1880 is registered by Heritage New Zealand as a Category I structure.

Timaru's population got a boost with the arrival of the first ship carrying immigrants for the town. The Strathallan arrived in 1859 with approximately 120 settlers. The district grew rapidly, and wool was exported direct from Timaru to London beginning in 1864. Le Cren was involved in the trade through his stock and station agency, H. J. Le Cren and Company, and he was also lending money to farmers. Discussions were held in Timaru about South Canterbury breaking away from the Canterbury Province over the financial burden that the Lyttelton Rail Tunnel, and that it might even prevent Timaru from being declared a port city, as the provincial council may want to see goods shipped by railway to gain income for the tunnel project. The first meeting of some 150 electors was held on 17 August 1861 in Le Cren's wool shed. Le Cren sold the landing services business that undertook cargo services between ships and the shore to the Canterbury Provincial Council in the mid-1860s. The government-operated service was of poor quality, and a private business was set up in competition. Captain Cain was involved in this venture, and the former Landing Service Building is registered by Heritage New Zealand as a Category I heritage structure.

Le Cren was a member of various political bodies. He served on the Timaru and Gladstone Board of Works, The Levels Road Board, and the Timaru Municipal Council.

== Life in London ==
Le Cren sold his business interests in Timaru to Miles and Company (Note: E P W Miles, F Banks, H P Murray Aynsley, F Archer, C S B Hilton, R Pryor, J T Ford. Carrying on business as shipowners, storekeepers, stockholders, run holders, commission merchants, estate and general agents and auctioneers at Christchurch (Miles and Co) and Timaru (Miles, Archer & Co)) in 1866 but he remained manager for a while. He held sheep stations at Simon's Pass near Lake Pukaki, Peel Forest, and Otaio. In 1873 or 1874 he sold his homestead and moved his family to London having before 1873 established a new business there, Russell Le Cren and Co, in partnership with Dunedin's George Gray Russell. They set up offices at 37 Lombard Street. Russell Le Cren and Co along with Russell Ritchie & Co of Dunedin was bought in 1877 and together they formed the initial core of National Mortgage and Agency Company of New Zealand, soon to become one of the country's largest stock and station agencies. His wife died in London the day the City of Glasgow Bank finally collapsed, 2 October 1878. National Mortgage & Agency was financed by Scottish investors and the crash brought about a slump in business for Le Cren.

== Return to Timaru ==
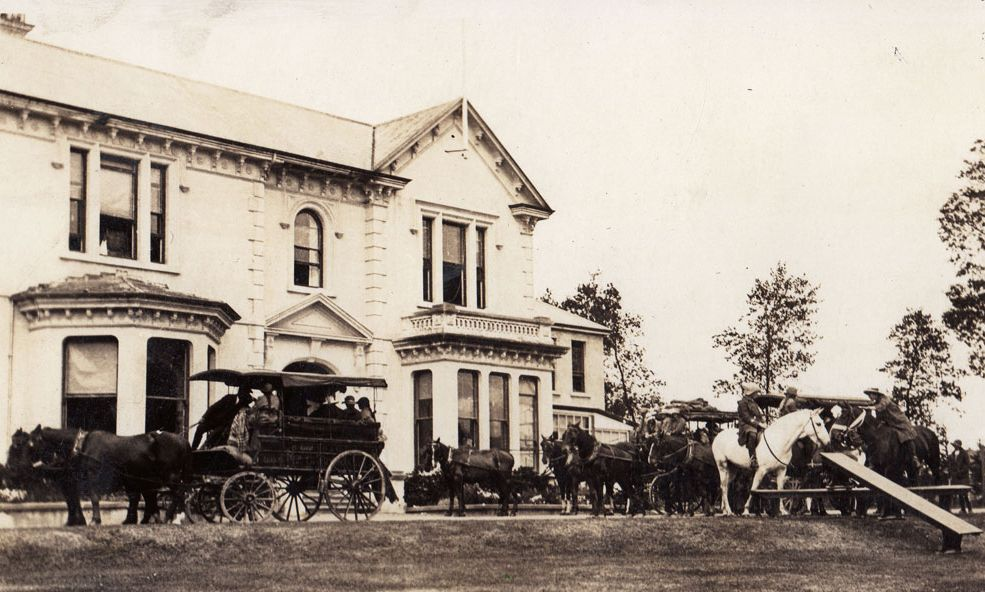
Picnic at Craighead School in 1922

Le Cren returned to Timaru by late 1882, having bought in January 1881 a substantial house on the outskirts of town built in 1875 by surveyor Henry Sealy (1838–1925). He called the house Craighead after his brother-in-law's castle in Forfarshire, Scotland.

He was in poor health for some time before he died a widower at Craighead on 20 May 1895 survived by three sons and four daughters. His eldest son, Henry Arthur Le Cren, was part-owner of Guinness and Le Cren, which was also a predecessor company for PGG Wrightson. He was buried at Timaru Cemetery. The Timaru Herald's obituary described him:

The deceased gentleman will be remembered by the older generation of settlers here as a shrewd but upright and able business man... In his grasp of financial questions, he had few if any equals... In private life, he was generous and unassuming, and as much liked as he was respected in business circles, and no one among the old identities of Timaru has been more generally respected.

Craighead was put on the market in 1910 and purchased by four sisters to establish a girls school, Craighead Diocesan School, which caters for year 7 to 13 girls.

The main building is registered by Heritage New Zealand as a Category II heritage structure.
