= Myer Caselberg =

Storekeeper, businessman, local politician

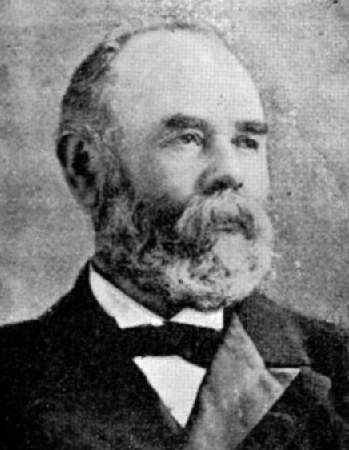
Myer Caselberg

Myer Caselberg (1841 – 23 June 1922) was a New Zealand storekeeper, businessman and local politician. He was born in Gaorah, Poland in 1841. He was Mayor of Masterton from 1886 to 1888.

== Wairarapa Farmers Co-operative Association ==
Caselberg formed this company in 1892 with a capital of £100,000. It was formed to own his existing businesses. By 1908 it was the largest inland trading organisation in the North Island of New Zealand. Principally a stock and station agency, its activities included eight retail stores, cheese and butter factories, motor vehicle dealerships etc.

WFCA was acquired by Wright Stephenson in 1959 and is now part of PGG Wrightson.

== Family life ==
Caselberg was married twice. In 1868 he married Frances Marks, who died aged 47 in 1890. Two years after Frances's death he married Rosetta Victoria Keesing. Rosetta survived her husband, dying in 1941 at the age of 80 or 81.
