= 1869 Taieri by-election =

New Zealand by-election

The 1869 Taieri by-election was a by-election held on 19 June 1869 during the 4th New Zealand Parliament in the Otago electorate of Taieri.

The by-election was caused by the resignation of the incumbent MP Donald Reid. The by-election was won by Henry Howorth. The runner-up was Thomas Culling, with six candidates having contested the election.

== Results ==
1869 Taieri by-election
| Party | Candidate | Votes | % | ±% |
|---|---|---|---|---|
| Independent | Henry Howorth | 70 | 32.56 | |
| Independent | Thomas Culling | 57 | 26.51 | |
| Independent | William Murray | 53 | 24.65 | |
| Independent | John Sibbald | 24 | 11.16 | |
| Independent | Alexander Rennie | 11 | 5.12 | |
| Independent | James McIndoe | 0 | 0 | |
| Turnout | | 215 | | |
| Majority | | 13 | 6.05 | |
