= National Mortgage and Agency Company of New Zealand =

New Zealand stock and station agency

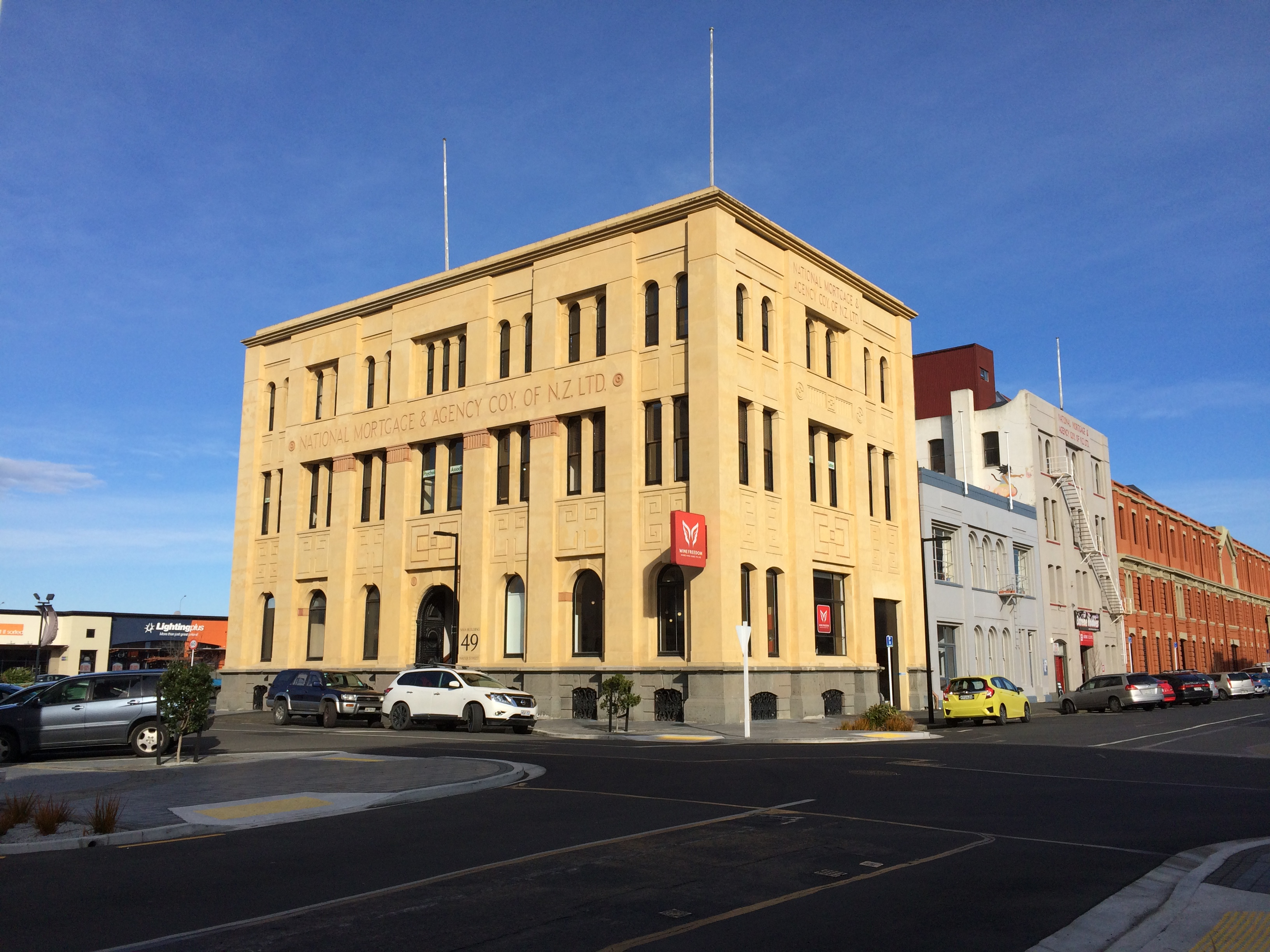
- Water Street, Dunedin
- Industry: Stock and station agency
- Founded: 1877; 149 years ago in London
- Founders: George Gray Russell and John Macfarlane Ritchie
- Defunct: merged 1972 NMA Wright Stephenson
- Fate: merged with Wright Stephenson & Co in 1972 to form NMA Wright Stephenson
- Headquarters: London / Dunedin from 1969 / Wellington from 1971, England until 1969 then New Zealand
- Area served: New Zealand
- Key people: George Gray Russell; John Macfarlane Ritchie; George Robert Ritchie; James McLaren Ritchie
- Products: Pastoral property investment and development; services to agricultural and pastoral producers

National Mortgage and Agency Company of New Zealand Limited owned a nationwide stock and station agency business originally intended to invest directly in New Zealand pastoral activities and lend to other participants in that industry. By the 1960s it was involved not only in the export of wool, meat, and livestock, but it also provided grain and seed merchandising, wholesale grocery services such as wines and spirits, and arrangement of property and other real estate sales.

The business was founded in 1864 in Dunedin by G.G Russell and that was taken over by the new London enterprise in 1878. 108 years after foundation, the business merged with competitor Wright Stephenson & Co to form NMA Wright Stephenson in 1972.

== London and Scottish investors ==
National Mortgage and Agency Company of New Zealand Limited was formed in 1877 to:

- have a capital of £1,000,000 divided into 100,000 shares of £10 each of which 50,000 would be issued immediately including 15,000 shares set aside for New Zealand
- to raise money by issuing debentures
- to lend it to the owners of estates and other property in New Zealand
- to carry on an agency business with run holders, sheepfarmers and others to whom advances will be made upon their stations, cattle sheep and wool-clip
- and to make advance on bills of lading of wool and other colonial produce

The shares were quoted on the London Stock Exchange for the first time on 14 August 1877. From the beginning there was a close association with Dunedin's National Bank of New Zealand. The New Zealand Head Office would be located in New Zealand's commercial capital, Dunedin.

Much of the debenture capital was raised in Scotland.

The first investment was in two existing businesses: Russell, Ritchie and Co., of Dunedin and Timaru, New Zealand, and its close associate Russell, Le Cren and Co., of London.

== Russell, Ritchie, Le Cren ==
Perthshire-born George Gray Russell (1828–1919), a London ship and insurance broker, came to New Zealand in late 1864 and set up in business as a general merchant selling from premises in Dunedin's Stafford Street: brandy, fencing wire, nails and corrugated iron, oats and timber and other goods. Once established, he also represented British pastoral investors, shipping lines and merchants, and shipped wool, grain and produce to Britain. He was assisted by John Macfarlane Ritchie (1842–1912) who arrived a few months later than Russell at the beginning of 1865.

Russell had contracted Ritchie in Scotland after being recommended to interview the 23 year-old. Content to delegate the necessary authority to young Ritchie, Russell regularly travelled widely from Otago up to South Canterbury and down to Southland, dealing with clients and noting investment and business opportunities. He established his first branch office in Timaru in 1866. A little later, he took Ritchie into partnership and in 1873 George Gray Russell & Co became Russell Ritchie & Co.

In Timaru, Henry Le Cren sold his Timaru business the same year as Russell opened in Timaru. The two became friends. Russell, before emigrating to New Zealand had been a shipping and insurance agent in London. Together they set up (before 1873) Russell, Le Cren & Co in 37 Lombard Street, London where visiting squatters were made welcome to regard it as their London headquarters. They were within the premises of the National Bank of New Zealand and would become those of National Mortgage & Agency.

The offer of shares in National Mortgage & Agency was well publicised in New Zealand and over-subscribed. Russell happened to be in London. Aware that NMA would want to invest in an existing business Russell and Ritchie hung back from direct discussion of possibilities but William Dymock in Dunedin, general manager of National Bank of New Zealand, was a useful conduit for the very slow communications between interested parties (when a delivery in as little as 74 days became occasion for delight). Negotiations were completed and NMA took over the London firm, Russell Le Cren & Co, as of 1 January 1878 and the Dunedin firm, Russell Ritchie & Co, as of 1 April 1878. Russell and Ritchie were appointed managing directors.

On 1 February 1878 the column City Intelligence in The Times included this statement: "The National Mortgage and Agency Company of New Zealand Limited has made an arrangement with the firms of Russell, Le Cren and Co., of London and Russell, Ritchie and Co., of Dunedin and Timaru, New Zealand, for the transfer of their businesses to the company. Mr George Gray Russell will join the board of directors as soon as the necessary formalities are completed and Mr John Macfarlane Ritchie will be general manager of the company in New Zealand. On and after 1 February the business of the company will carried on at No. 37 Lombard Street, E.C." While Russell did attend board meetings when in London he was never a director of NMA. The dissolution of the partnership of the three men was reported in the Gazette of 2 August 1878.

== Location of control of NMA ==
=== Move to New Zealand ===
In the absence of a double taxation agreement between Britain and New Zealand the directors, now that about 75 per cent of shareholders were New Zealanders and virtually all operations and assets were in New Zealand, decided to move the official headquarters and tax residence from London to New Zealand. The board of directors was restructured so a majority were New Zealand residents. A special meeting in December 1968 approved the planned change of residence to New Zealand. The change was scheduled to take effect from and including 4 February 1969. The first Annual General Meeting in Dunedin took place on 18 November 1969.

National Mortgage and Agency Company of New Zealand remained a company incorporated in England.

=== NMA Company of New Zealand Limited ===
Following the 1969 Annual General Meeting shareholders met again and changed the English company's name to NMA Company of New Zealand Limited

=== Move from Dunedin to Wellington ===
The 95th Annal General Meeting was held in Wellington in November 1971.

== NMA Wright Stephenson Holdings ==
Following the merger with Wright Stephenson in 1972 Wright Stephenson was renamed NMA Wright Stephenson Holdings. On 31 October 1973 NMA Wright Stephenson changed its name to Challenge Corporation Limited. It had become New Zealand's largest stock and station agency.

== Businesses brought into NMA and location of their headquarters ==
Many continued trading under their own names:

- 1878 Russell Le Cren & Co (foundation of NMA), London (as of 1 January 1878)
- 1878 Russell Ritchie & Co, Dunedin and Timaru (as of 1 April 1878)
- Loan and Investment Co, Christchurch
- 1896 Levin & Co Limited, Wellington completed 1960
- 1955 J R Mills & Co Limited, Riverton
- 1957 Alfred Buckland & Sons Limited, Auckland (completion)
- 1957 H Matson & Co Limited, Christchurch
- 1958 Robertson Bros, Oamaru
- 1960 J G Ward & Co, Stock and station agents, Invercargill

including MacEwans Machinery Limited

- 1960 G W Vercoe & Co, (purchase completed) Hamilton
- 1961 Murray Roberts & Co Limited (July), Wellington
