= Taieri (electorate) =

- Single-member general constituency for the New Zealand House of Representatives
- Interactive map of boundaries from the 2026 election
- Formation: 1869, 2020
- Region: Otago
- Character: Rural and suburban
- Term: 3 years

Member for Taieri
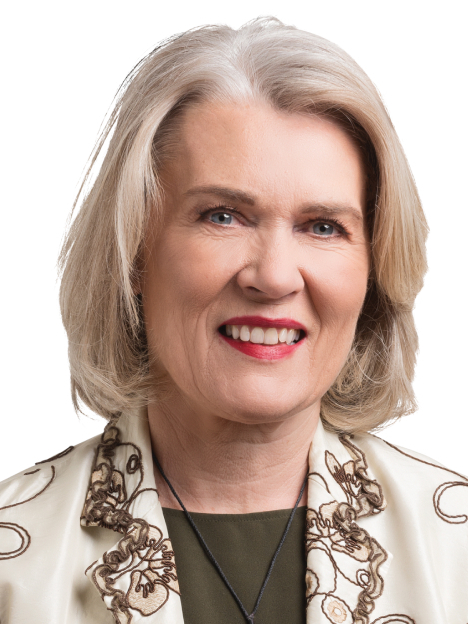
- Ingrid Leary since 17 October 2020
- Party: Labour
- List MPs: Mark Patterson (NZ First); Scott Willis (Green)
- Previous MP: null
Party vote distribution

Taieri is a parliamentary electorate in the Otago region of New Zealand, initially from 1866 to 1911, and was later recreated during the 2019/20 electoral redistribution ahead of the 2020 election.

== Population centres ==
=== First incarnation ===
In the 1865 electoral redistribution, the House of Representatives focussed its review of electorates to South Island electorates only, as the Otago gold rush had caused significant population growth, and a redistribution of the existing population. Fifteen additional South Island electorates were created, including Taieri, and the number of Members of Parliament was increased by 13 to 70.

This electorate was based on the town of Mosgiel.

=== Second incarnation ===
Map of boundaries at the 2020 and 2023 general elections

The seat was recreated for the 2020 general election by renaming the electorate of Dunedin South and amending its borders, particularly with a large area around the Clutha River and South Otago added from Clutha-Southland. This is due to a rate of population growth below the South Island average in Dunedin that means it can no longer fully support two electorates. The current electorate of Taieri has an area stretching from South Dunedin to Balclutha.

The previous electorate of Dunedin South had been held by the Labour Party since its creation in 1996, and specifically by Clare Curran since 2008. However, the new boundaries for Taieri include more rural areas, and Curran announced in 2019 that she would not be seeking reelection in 2020.

== History ==
The Taieri electorate was first established for the 1866 general election for the 4th New Zealand Parliament.

Donald Reid was the first representative. He resigned in 1869 and was succeeded by Henry Howorth. Reid was re-elected at the 1871 general election, and elected unopposed in the 1875 general election that was held on 29 December. Reid resigned once again in 1878, and was succeeded by William Cutten. Reid's son, also called Donald Reid, represented the electorate 1902–08.

All other members retired at the end of their representation. When the electorate was abolished in 1911, Thomas Mackenzie stood successfully for Egmont.

=== Members of Parliament ===
Taieri has been represented by eight Members of Parliament:

Key

Independent Liberal Conservative Labour NZ First Green

Election	Winner
1866 election	Donald Reid Sr
1869 by-election	Henry Howorth
1871 election	Donald Reid Sr
1875 election	Donald Reid Sr
1878 by-election	William Cutten
1879 election	James Fulton
1881 election	James Fulton
1884 election	James Fulton
1887 election	James Fulton
1890 election	Walter Carncross
1893 election	Walter Carncross
1896 election	Walter Carncross
1899 election	Walter Carncross
1902 election	Donald Reid Jr
1905 election	Donald Reid Jr
1908 election	Thomas Mackenzie
(Electorate abolished 1911–2020)
2020 election	Ingrid Leary
2023 election	Ingrid Leary
2026 election	Ingrid Leary

=== List MPs ===
Members of Parliament elected from party lists in elections where that person also unsuccessfully contested the Taieri electorate. Unless otherwise stated, all MPs terms began and ended at general elections.

Election	Winner
2023 election	Mark Patterson
2023 election	Scott Willis

== Election results ==
=== 2026 election ===
The next election will be held on 7 November 2026. Candidates for Taieri are listed at Candidates in the 2026 New Zealand general election by electorate § Taieri. Official results will be available after 27 November 2026.

=== 2023 election ===
2023 general election: Taieri
Notes:	Blue background denotes the winner of the electorate vote. Pink background denotes a candidate elected from their party list. Yellow background denotes an electorate win by a list member, or other incumbent. A ✓ or ✗ denotes status of any incumbent, win or lose respectively.						
Party	Candidate	Votes	%	±%	Party votes	%	±%
Labour	✓ Ingrid Leary	16,579	39.39	−16.84	14,507	34.13	−24.79
National	Matthew French	15,136	35.96	+7.33	14,206	33.42	+12.32
Green	Scott Willis	3,898	9.26	+4.35	4,581	10.78	+5.38
NZ First	Mark Patterson	3,069	7.29	+4.38	3,259	7.67	+5.06
ACT	Burty Meffan	1,697	4.03	+1.16	3,345	7.87	+0.46
NZ Loyal	Fred Roberts	663	1.57	—	477	1.12	—
Independent	Mac Gardner	286	0.68	—			
Independent	Changrong Dong	142	0.34	—			
Independent	David Webber	120	0.28	—			
Opportunities					929	2.19	+0.93
Te Pāti Māori					245	0.58	+0.46
NewZeal					207	0.49	+0.05
Legalise Cannabis					200	0.47	+0.20
Animal Justice					75	0.18	—
DemocracyNZ					66	0.15	—
Freedoms NZ					57	0.13	—
Women's Rights					39	0.09	—
New Conservatives					32	0.07	−1.03
Leighton Baker Party					23	0.05	—
New Nation					11	0.03	—
Informal votes		498			247		
Total valid votes		42,088			42,506		
Turnout		42,506	—	—			
Labour hold	Majority	1,443	3.43	−24.16			

=== 2020 election ===
2020 general election: Taieri
Notes:	Blue background denotes the winner of the electorate vote. Pink background denotes a candidate elected from their party list. Yellow background denotes an electorate win by a list member, or other incumbent. A ✓ or ✗ denotes status of any incumbent, win or lose respectively.						
Party	Candidate	Votes	%	±%	Party votes	%	±%
Labour	Ingrid Leary	25,263	56.23	—	26,608	58.92	—
National	Liam Kernaghan	12,865	28.63	—	9,531	21.10	—
Green	Scott Willis	2,207	4.91	—	2,440	5.40	—
NZ First	Mark Patterson	1,309	2.91	—	1,179	2.61	—
ACT	Robert Andrews	1,291	2.87	—	3,302	7.31	—
New Conservative	Ally Kelleher	472	1.05	—	501	1.10	—
Advance NZ	Fred Roberts	256	0.56	—	236	0.52	—
ONE	Stan Smith	201	0.44	—	105	0.23	—
Independent	Oliver Lequeux	130	0.28	—			
Social Credit	Warren Voight	107	0.23	—	45	0.09	—
Independent	David Webber	75	0.16	—			
Opportunities					571	1.26	—
Legalise Cannabis					122	0.27	—
Māori Party					55	0.12	—
Outdoors					34	0.07	—
Sustainable NZ					27	0.05	—
Vision NZ					10	0.02	—
TEA					6	0.01	—
Heartland					3	0.01	—
Informal votes		746			382		
Total valid votes		44,922			45,157		
Turnout		45,157					
Labour win new seat	Majority	12,398	27.59				

=== 1899 election ===
1899 general election: Taieri
Party	Candidate	Votes	%	±%
Liberal	Walter Carncross	1,927	56.78	−2.17
Conservative	Alexander Campbell Begg	1,467	43.22	
Majority		460	13.55	−4.34
Turnout		3,394	75.07	+1.22
Registered electors		4,521		

=== 1890 election ===
1890 general election: Taieri
Party	Candidate	Votes	%	±%
Liberal	Walter Carncross	548	38.87	
Independent	William Snow	424	30.07	
Independent	William Barron	320	22.70	
Independent	Arthur John Burns	118	8.37	
Majority		124	8.79	
Turnout		1,410	69.73	
Registered electors		2,022		

=== 1878 by-election ===
1878 Taieri by-election
Party	Candidate	Votes	%	±%
Independent	William Cutten	234	33.86	
Independent	William Snow	232	33.57	
Independent	Mr Barron	225	32.56	
Majority		2	0.29	
Turnout		691		

=== 1869 by-election ===
1869 Taieri by-election
Party	Candidate	Votes	%	±%
Independent	Henry Howorth	70	32.56	
Independent	Thomas Culling	57	26.51	
Independent	William Murray	53	24.65	
Independent	John Sibbald	24	11.16	
Independent	Alexander Rennie	11	5.12	
Independent	James McIndoe	0	0	
Turnout		215		
Majority		13	6.05	
