= Elizabeth Turnbull =

New Zealand woollen mill worker and centenarian

Elizabeth Turnbull (2 May 1885 – 4 June 1988) was a New Zealand woollen mill worker and centenarian. She was the head of her section in the hosier department at Mosgiel Woollen Mill.

== Early life and education ==
Turnbull was born in Mosgiel, Otago, on 2 May 1885 to Catherine Armstrong, a milliner, and Sydney Turnbull, a baker. Her parents emigrated from Scotland in 1864. Turnbull was the youngest of eleven children. She attended East Taieri School from the age of 6 to 14. Turnbull had aspirations to become a teacher but her family could not afford to keep her in school. Her family attended the East Taieri Presbyterian Church.

== Career ==
Turnbull began working as a domestic servant at the age of 14. She earned three shillings a week. In 1900, she joined the hosiery department at Mosgiel Woollen Mill where she began making socks. At the mill, women earned lower wages than men for completing the same work. She worked 5.5 day weeks and earned 24 shillings a fortnight. She was known for her assertiveness and speaking on behalf of others when she saw injustice. She disliked unions and resisted joining until she was given an ultimatum of being fired or paying union fees. She became head of her section in the hosier department. Turnbull was forced to retire in 1957.

== Personal life ==
Turnbull's father died in 1903. She never married, and lived with her mother. When her mother died in 1927, Turnbull moved to a house on Gordon Road in Mosgiel. She lived independently and cared for her hens and vegetables. She became a local celebrity when she became a centenarian. Turnbull was the guest of honour at the 130th anniversary of the East Taieri School and participated in Mosgiel's centenary celebrations. She died on 4 June 1988 at the Ross Home in Dunedin, and was buried at East Taieri Cemetery.
