= Irene Malachi =

Ni-Vanuatu human rights activist

- Born: Vanuatu
- Died: 2017
- Occupation: Nurse
- Years active: 2002–2017
- Known for: First person to publicly disclose their HIV status in Vanuatu

Irene Malachi (died 2017) was a Ni-Vanuatu human rights activist and nurse. After being diagnosed with HIV in 2002, Malachi publicly disclosed her diagnosis. After experiencing discrimination and harassment as a result, she went on to create the IZA Foundation, which campaigned for greater awareness and understanding of HIV in Vanuatu and the Pacific region.

== Personal life ==
Malachi trained as a nurse and worked as a nurse anaesthetist for the Ministry of Health. She had a daughter, Zara.

== Activism ==
In 2002, Malachi became the first person in Vanuatu to be diagnosed with HIV; her daughter Zara was later also diagnosed as having the disease. It was hypothesised that Malachi had contracted the disease during her nursing career, likely through treating an undiagnosed patient. Malachi and her daughter later received medical treatment in New Caledonia.

Following Malachi's diagnosis, she was fired from her job as a nurse, and her husband left her. After publicly announcing her diagnosis, she experienced harassment and discrimination, including being spat at; being prevented from entering shops; and having people run away from her and her daughter.

In 2004, to address the discrimination she had experienced, Malachi established the IZA Foundation, where she served as project manager and coordinator. The organisation aimed to increase public knowledge and understanding of HIV across Vanuatu, through meetings with villages, church groups, chiefs, schools and youth organisations. Malachi led sessions in which she discussed her own experiences of both disease and people's responses to her diagnosis, and addressed stereotypes about HIV, as well as ways to prevent its spread. The IZA Foundation went on to receive support from international organisations such as Save the Children and the Pacific Islands AIDS Foundation.

Malachi's work was not supported by the Government of Vanuatu. Malachi was not invited to its public commemoration of World AIDS Day in December 2005, despite having previously worked for the Ministry of Health and being the only person in the country openly living with HIV; the Pacific Islands AIDS Foundation described the decision not to invite her as "outrageous". In 2006, the government publicly withdrew its support of the documentary film Irene, which followed Malachi's life and work, hours before its Vanuatu premiere, due to concerns it portrayed the Ministry of Health in a "bad light".

In addition to her work with the IZA Foundation, Malachi also worked as an ambassador for the Pacific Islands AIDS Foundation, completing outreach work throughout the region, including in New Caledonia, Australia and New Zealand, where she was interviewed by TV3 in 2007. Malachi called for therapeutic support to be offered alongside medical support for people living with HIV. In August 2010, Malachi spoke at the United Nations' Civil Society Conference in Melbourne, Australia about her experiences living with HIV.

== Recognition ==
Three films and a book were written about Malachi and her life to be distributed across Vanuatu by the IZA Foundation. In 2006, the New Zealand filmmaker Ingrid Leary, commissioned by Maire Bopp Allport of the Pacific Islands AIDS Foundation, directed the short film Irene, which followed Malachi's life and work. It was released in English, French and Bislama.
