= Jim Ritchie (businessman) =

Businessman, Anglican church administrator (1907–1981)

James McLaren Ritchie CBE (1907–1981) was a New Zealand businessman and Anglican church administrator. He was born in Dunedin, New Zealand, in 1907, and was the grandson of John Macfarlane Ritchie.

In the 1979 New Year Honours, Ritchie was appointed a Commander of the Order of the British Empire, for services to business, educational, charitable and Anglican Church affairs.
