= Thomas Hall (murderer) =

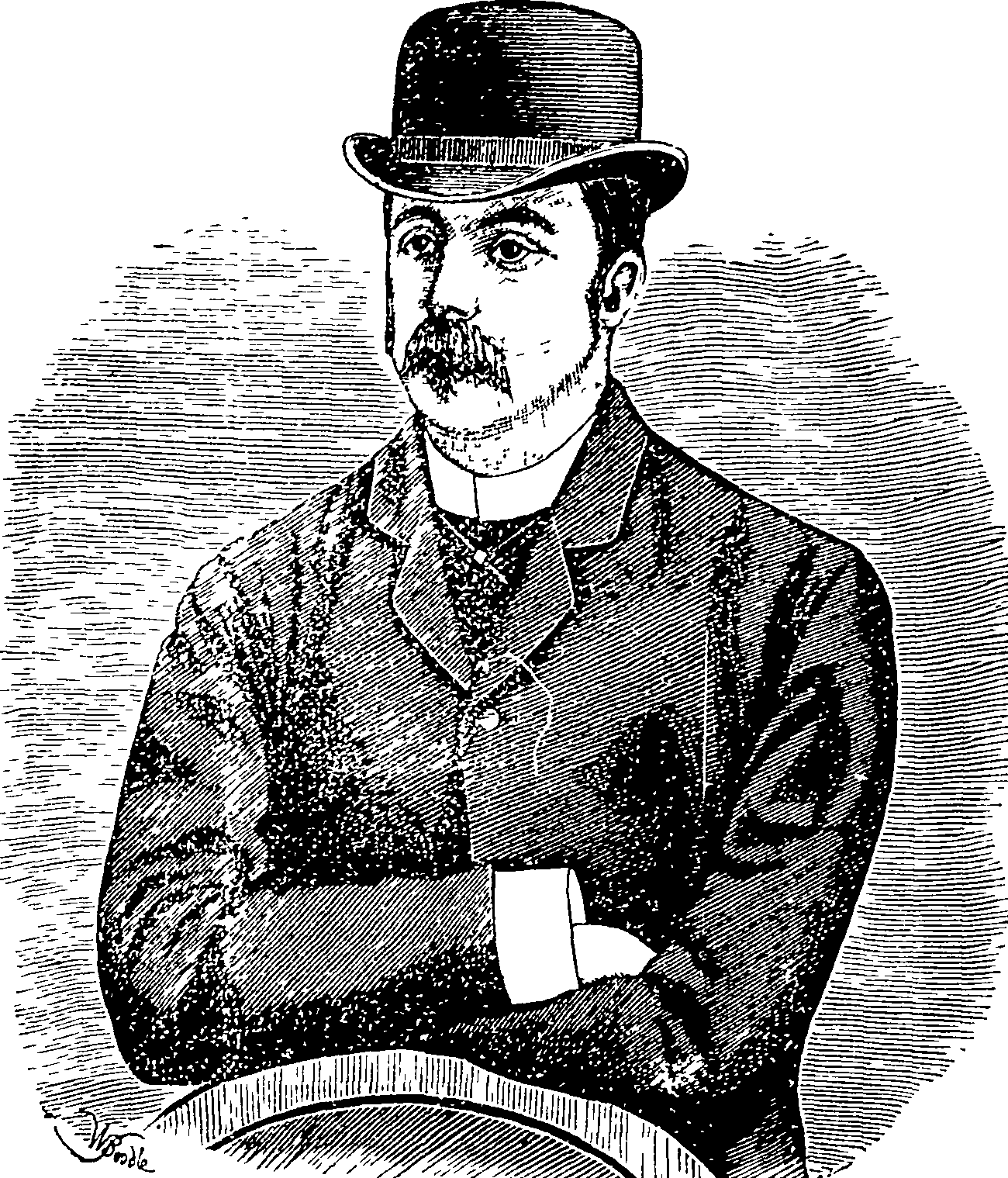
Thomas Hall

Thomas Hall (c. 1848–1929) was a New Zealand commission agent, forger and murderer.

Hall was born in Kingston upon Hull, Yorkshire, England, on 24 January 1848. He migrated to New Zealand as a young child with his parents in 1853.

Hall's father, TW Hall eventually settled in Timaru and young Thomas managed a property owned by his uncle, John Hall, who later became a prominent New Zealand politician, Sir John Hall.

Hall established himself in business in the early 1880s becoming a partner in Hall and Meason, commission agents, selling land and lending money.

He married Kate Emily Espie on 26 May 1885. She was the stepdaughter of Captain Henry Cain, who was Timaru's second mayor and regarded as the city's father. Cain died at Hall's house on 29 January 1886.

The Halls had a child in June 1886 and soon after, his wife showed signs of a mysterious illness that puzzled her doctor. After a family friend drank from a cup intended for Kate, rumours in the community spread and the Doctor began to suspect poisoning. He sent off a sample of her stomach contents for analysis which confirmed suspicions. Hall and a family friend, Margaret Houston were committed for trial.

Houston was acquitted, but Hall was sentenced to life imprisonment for attempted murder, and 12 charges of forgery. Soon after, the doctor had Hall's father-in-law's body exhumed and signs of poisoning were found. Justice Williams sentenced Thomas Hall to death for this second case, but on appeal, the conviction was overturned on a technicality. Hall was released from Mount Eden Prisons after serving 21 years and left the country.

In the NZ Dictionary of Biography records that the time and place of Hall's death is unknown, however biographer Peter Graham claims that after his release he left to live in Australia in the seaside town of Yeppoon where he is buried today under the assumed name of Paul Newstead.
