= Walter Carncross =

New Zealand politician

The Honourable Sir Walter Carncross
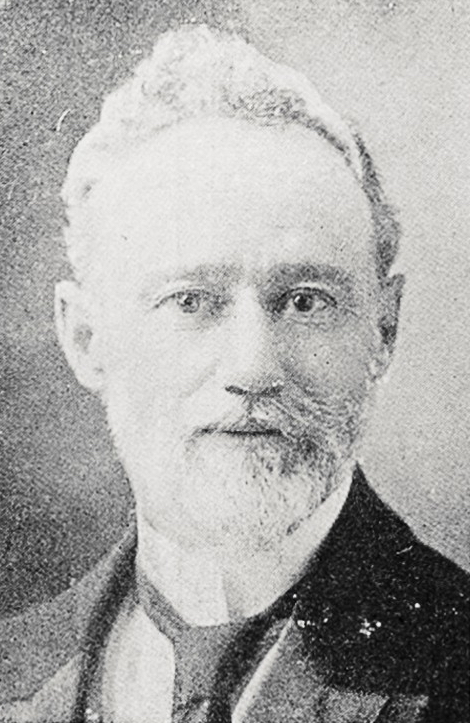
- Carncross in 1922

15th Speaker of the Legislative Council
- In office 1 November 1918 – 18 July 1939
- Preceded by: Charles Johnston
- Succeeded by: Mark Fagan

Member of the New Zealand Parliament for Taieri
- In office 5 December 1890 – 25 November 1902
- Preceded by: James Fulton
- Succeeded by: Donald Reid

Personal details
- Born: c. 1855 Bendigo, Victoria
- Died: 30 June 1940 (aged 88) Eltham, Taranaki
- Party: Liberal

Sir Walter Charles Frederick Carncross (c. 1855 – 30 June 1940) was a New Zealand politician of the Liberal Party.

== Biography ==
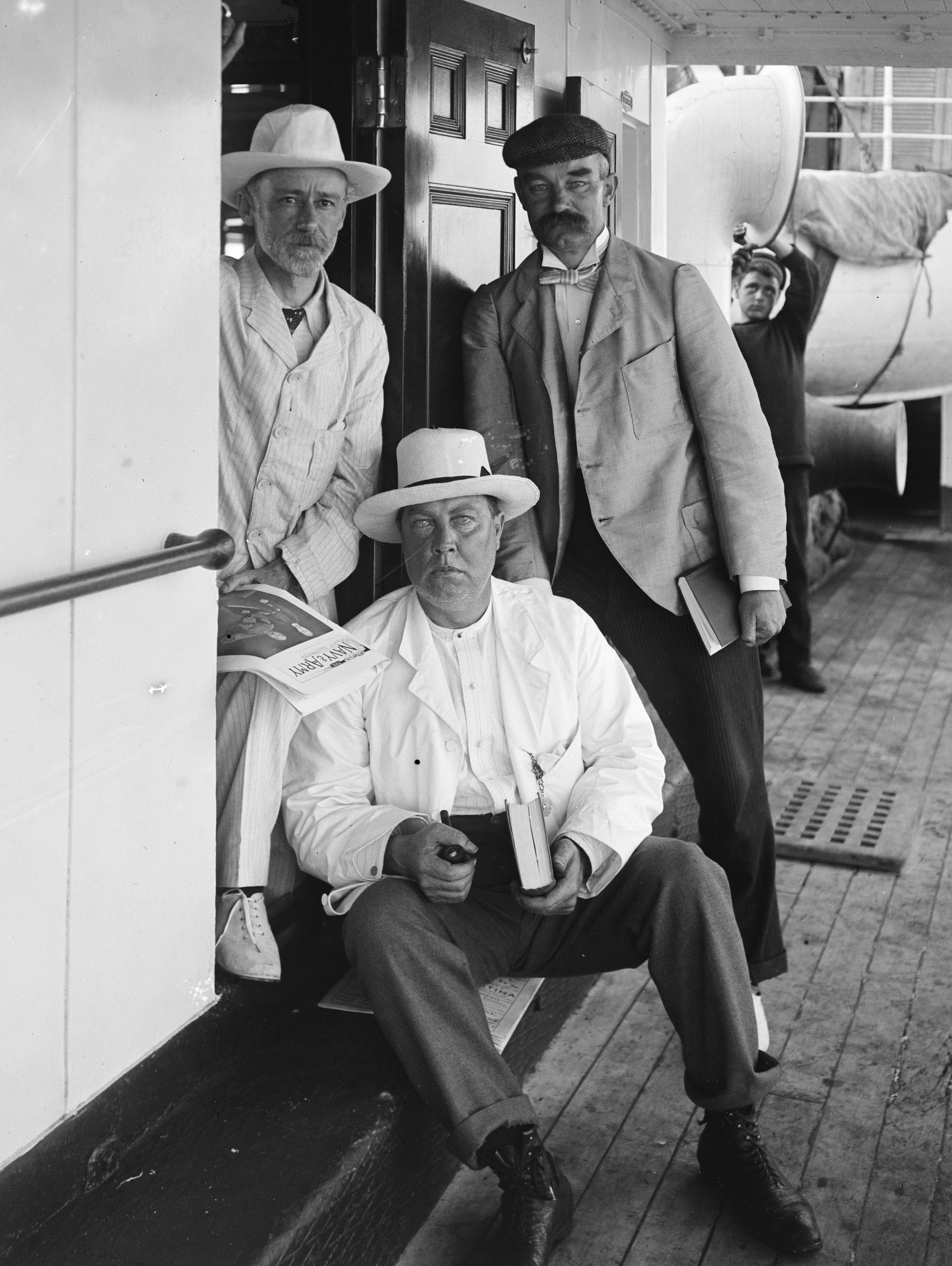
Carnoss (left), William Thomas Wood and James Allen during the Parliamentary Excursion to South Sea Islands, 1903

=== Early life ===
Carncross was born in Bendigo, Victoria, in 1855 (or 1853). He came to Dunedin with his parents when he was seven years old. Carncross married Mary, a daughter of R. Johnston in 1883. He was to become a newspaper proprietor by trade, owning both the Taieri Advocate & Eltham Argus.

=== Political career ===
New Zealand Parliament
Years	Term	Electorate	Party
1890–1893	11th	Taieri	Liberal
1893–1896	12th	Taieri	Liberal
1896–1899	13th	Taieri	Liberal
1899–1902	14th	Taieri	Liberal

He represented the Taieri electorate from 1890 to 1902, when he retired.

He was in favour of perpetual leasing of land and opposed the sale of the railways. He was opposed to women's suffrage and in 1891 deliberately moved an amendment that was intended to make the bill fail in the Legislative Council. His amendment was for women to become eligible to be voted into the House of Representatives. This infuriated the suffragette Catherine Fulton, who organised a protest at the 1893 election. He served as the Liberal Party's Senior Whip in 1902, his last year in the lower house

He was appointed to the Legislative Council on 18 March 1903 by the Liberal Government, and at the expiry of his seven-year terms, he was reappointed five times; on 18 March 1910, on 17 March 1917 & 17 March 1924 by the Reform Government; 17 March 1931 by the United Government; and 16 March 1938 by the First Labour Government. His district was Taranaki, and then Eltham from 1917.

He served on the Council until his death. He was elected Chairman of Committees on 6 July 1910 and served in this role until 1 November 1918, when he became Speaker, succeeding the deceased Charles Johnston. He remained Speaker until 18 July 1939; his 21-year service as speaker was an Empire record. He was succeeded by Labour's Mark Fagan during the time of the First Labour Government.

Carncross was appointed a Knight Bachelor in the 1922 King's Birthday Honours. In 1935, he was awarded the King George V Silver Jubilee Medal.

=== Death ===
Carncross died on 30 June 1940 at his home in Eltham, Taranaki. He was survived by Lady Carncross, a son and a daughter.

== Notes ==
New Zealand Parliament
Preceded by James Fulton	Member of Parliament for Taieri; 1890–1902	Succeeded by Donald Reid
Political offices
Preceded by Richard Reeves	Chairman of Committees of the Legislative Council; 1910–1918	Succeeded by Oliver Samuel
Preceded by Charles Johnston	Speaker of the New Zealand Legislative Council; 1918–1939	Succeeded by Mark Fagan
Party political offices
Preceded by Jack Stevens	Senior Whip of the Liberal Party; 1902	Succeeded by John O'Meara
