= Henry Cain =

Trader in New Zealand and mayor of Timaru

Captain Henry Cain statue in Timaru

Captain Henry Cain (1816 – 29 January 1886) was the second Mayor of Timaru. He was at sea from age 13 and was one of Timaru's first settlers, where he lived for his last 30 years.

== Life ==
Cain was born in 1816 in England. He went to sea at the age of 13 and traded between Sydney in Australia, the Pacific Ocean, China, and Auckland in New Zealand. In circa 1850, he owned a bar in Sacramento, California. In the following year, he traded with his 150-ton schooner Pauline in New Zealand, and his first consignment was kauri pine that he sold to Henry Le Cren of Lyttelton. The Pauline was lost during a June 1851 storm in Lyttelton Harbour that claimed a total of five vessels, and he bought the vessel Kaka to transport goods between Lyttelton and the Ferrymead wharf on the Ōpāwaho / Heathcote River for Christchurch under contract for Le Cren and his business partner, Joseph Longden. In 1852, he supplied diggers in the Victorian gold rush with the Fly that he bought from Wellington. After that, he owned The Ocean and traded with Auckland.

In 1857, he was asked by Le Cren to set up a trading post in Timaru, then merely a sheep station owned by George Rhodes. By the following year, Cain had become established in Timaru, was managing the landing station (there was no deep water in the port at that time), and Le Cren himself moved to Timaru and built a homestead for his family.

Cain was poisoned by his son-in-law, Thomas Hall, and died on 29 January 1886. His wife had died on 26 July 1878.

== Legacy ==
A statue of Captain Cain is placed in front of the Landing Service Building. Cain was one of the owners of that building; it is registered by Heritage New Zealand as a Category I heritage structure. The Timaru Herald reported on Cain from "their archives" as part of the 150th anniversary of their first publication in 1864.
