= Henry Howorth (New Zealand politician) =

New Zealand politician

New Zealand Parliament
Years	Term	Electorate	Party
1869–1870	4th	Taieri	Independent

Henry Howorth (2 August 1834 – 8 January 1907) was a 19th-century Member of Parliament in Otago, New Zealand.

He represented the Taieri electorate from 1869 to 1870, when he retired.

New Zealand Parliament
Preceded by Donald Reid	Member of Parliament for Taieri; 1869–1871	Succeeded by Donald Reid
