= Ingrid Leary =

New Zealand politician

Ingrid Leary MP
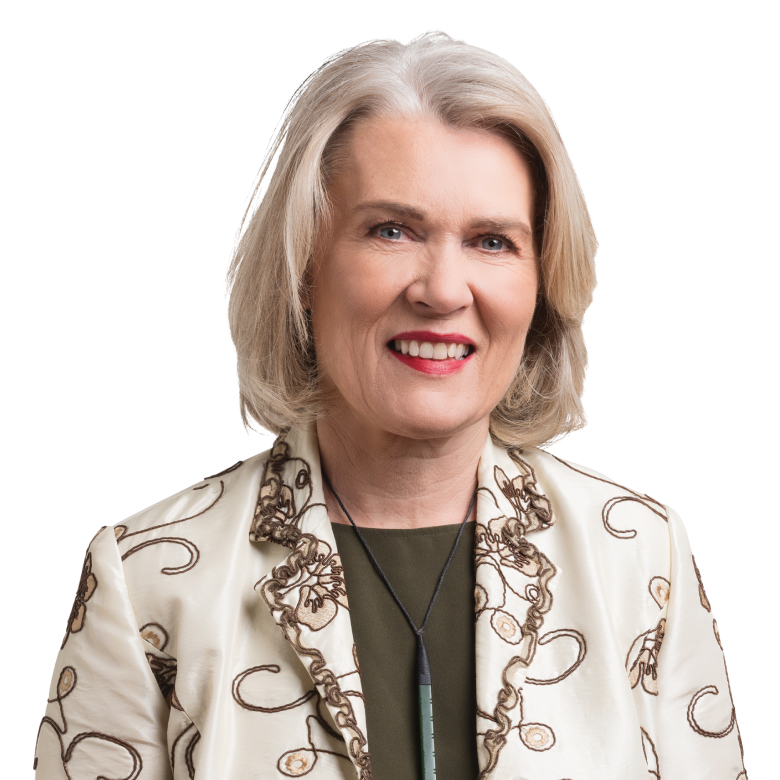
- Leary in 2023

Member of the New Zealand Parliament for Taieri
- Incumbent
- Assumed office 17 October 2020
- Preceded by: Clare Curran

Personal details
- Born: 29 October 1967 (age 59) West Germany
- Party: Labour
- Children: 3

Ingrid Marieke Leary (born 29 October 1967) is a New Zealand politician. In 2020 she was elected as a Member of Parliament in the House of Representatives for the Labour Party.

== Early life and career ==
Leary completed secondary schooling at Macleans College in Auckland before studying law at the University of Otago. She worked as a lawyer, parliamentary press secretary, university lecturer and broadcaster before entering Parliament. She helped to set up the journalism school in the University of the South Pacific in 1997, and lectured there on journalism. When she resigned in 1999 to take up a role in TV production in New Zealand, she was critical of the Fiji government's approach to the media. In 2006, Leary directed the produced the short film Irene, about the life of Ni-Vanuatu HIV/AIDS activist Irene Malachi.

In 2006 Leary received the New Zealand Special Service Medal for her broadcasting work in the aftermath of the 2004 Indian Ocean earthquake and tsunami in Aceh.

In 2009, as a producer for Campbell Live, Leary was summonsed by the New Zealand Police to appear before a depositions hearing about the theft of 96 medals from the National Army Museum in Waiouru. Campbell Live had broadcast an interview with a man who claimed to have participated in the burglary; the police sought the identity of the programme's informant. Lawyers for Leary and four other staff argued that journalists should not have to reveal sources unless the circumstances were exceptional, because it could discourage potential future sources from coming forward, and that the threshold for this was not met in that case. Judge Tony Randerson decided that public interest in a successful prosecution outweighed a journalist's right to protect a source; Campbell Live presenter John Campbell later agreed to assist police without naming his source.

Leary was press secretary for National MP Maurice Williamson, and she later served as the director of the British Council New Zealand from 2008 to 2020.

== Political career ==
New Zealand Parliament
Years	Term	Electorate	List	Party
2020–2023	53rd	Taieri	59	Labour
2023–2026	54th	Taieri	52	Labour
2026–present	55th	Taieri	38	Labour

=== 2020 election campaign ===
Leary was selected as the Labour candidate for the Dunedin South electorate, later expanded and renamed Taieri, ahead of Rachel Brooking and Simon McCallum. During the campaign, New Zealand First list MP Mark Patterson publicly queried her commitment to the electorate, as she had spent lockdown on Waiheke island. Leary claimed to be the victim of a smear campaign, as she had studied law in Dunedin, and had relocated to Dunedin with her family, including a child attending school in Dunedin, prior to her selection for the seat.

=== First term, 2020–2023 ===
Leary was elected in Taeiri with a majority of 12,398 over the National candidate Liam Kernaghan in the final count. She said she was hoping for a role in justice, social enterprise or issues relating to seniors.

By August 2022, Leary had joined the Inter-Parliamentary Alliance on China (IPAC), an organisation of legislators from various democratic countries that speaks out against alleged human rights abuses in China and the alleged threat that China posed to its neighbours. On 22 August, Lear and fellow New Zealand IPAC member and National Party Member of Parliament Simon O'Connor joined fellow members from Australia, India and Japan in establishing a new Indo-Pacific chapter to focus on increased Chinese militarisation in that region.

Leary inherited Louisa Wall's member's bill (the Protection of Journalists' Sources Bill) upon her retirement in May 2022. At that stage the Bill was being considered by the Justice Committee. In September 2022, Leary withdrew the Bill because of "insurmountable drafting issues" discovered through the legislative process, saying she would work on replacement legislation.

In early July 2023, Leary attracted media attention after she attended an election meeting organised by criminal gang Mongrel Mob member Harry Tam. Tam had organised the meeting in Dunedin to convince local Māori voters in marginal seats to tactically switch from the Māori electoral roll to the general roll during the 2023 New Zealand general election. He subsequently published a Facebook post stating that Leary had "gatecrashed" his meeting and was hesitant to be associated with him. In response, Leary said that she had thought that she was going to attend a public meeting organised by the Electoral Commission to encourage people to enroll to vote. She also stated that she did not condone the actions of the Mongrel Mob. While Prime Minister Chris Hipkins described Leary's actions as a "case of miscommunication," opposition National Party MP Mark Mitchell disputed Leary's account that she had accidentally attended Tam's meeting.

=== Second term, 2023–2026 ===
During the 2023 general election, Leary retained Taieri by a margin of 1,443 votes over the National Party's candidate Matthew French. She assumed the positions of spokesperson for seniors and mental health in the Shadow Cabinet of Chris Hipkins.

On 19 June 2024, Leary made remarks during a Parliamentary health select committee meeting criticising New Zealand First MP Tanya Unkovich's involvement with the mental health program "Gumboot Friday," describing her as a "known anti-trans activist." On 23 July, New Zealand First filed a complaint against Leary with Speaker Gerry Brownlee, expressing concern that it could be a breach of parliamentary privilege. On 1 August 2024, Leary apologised to Unkovich during Question Time in Parliament.

Following remarks by mental health advocate Mike King in 2024 describing alcohol as a solution to mental health, Leary called for a pause to government funding to King's I am Hope Foundation and its Gumboot Friday programme. In 2024, the Ministry of Health had granted $24 million for the I Am Hope to provide counselling services to people aged between 5 and 25 years over a four-year period. The Auditor-General subsequently launched a review into the programme and concluded in early December 2025 that I Am Hope and Gumboot Friday were being properly managed in accordance with the law. Following the report's release, King accused Leary of being obsessed with targeting his foundation and stated that the government funding went directly to counselling sessions for young people. In response to King's remarks, Leary defended her decision to seek a review into I Am Hope, citing public health concerns about King's alcohol remarks. She also said that it was her job as an opposition spokesperson to scrutinise "the complex contracting arrangements and MOU (memorandum of understanding) between the Ministry of Health, Health New Zealand and I Am Hope. Leary also criticised the Government's perceived favouritism of I Am Hope while other mental health organisations were experiencing funding cuts.

In early December 2025, Leary admitted using the app ChatGPT to generate questions directed at Minister for Seniors and New Zealand First MP Casey Costello. The news broadcaster 1News had obtained an email from Leary to the Minister containing a list of 20 questions, accompanied with AI prompts. When questioned by a 1News reporter, Leary initially denied sending the email and suggested one of her staffers had sent it. Later when questioned by the Otago Daily Times, Leary admitted to generating questions with ChatGPT and sending the email.

=== Third term, 2026–present ===
During the 2026 New Zealand general election, Leary contested the Taieri for Labour. She was ranked 38th on the Labour Party list. On 7 November, Leary retained the Taieri electorate by a large margin of 4,798 votes based on preliminary results.

== Family ==
Leary is a mother of three, and lives in Dunedin with her family.

New Zealand Parliament
Vacant Constituency recreated after abolition in 1911 Title last held by Thomas Mackenzie	Member of Parliament for Taieri; 2020–present	Incumbent
