= Donald Reid (politician, born 1833) =

New Zealand politician (1833–1919)

Donald Reid (16 July 1833 – 7 February 1919) was a Scottish-born 19th-century farmer, landowner, and businessman in Otago, New Zealand. A member of the Otago Provincial Council he was later a Member of Parliament for ten years between 1866 and 1878.

== Early life ==
Reid was born in Strathtay in Perthshire, Scotland. He was the third recorded son of Donald Reid and Margaret McGregor. His father died in 1844 and his mother remarried. Reid emigrated to New Zealand sailing from London 2 November 1848, arriving in Port Chalmers 4 April 1849 on the Mary (533 tons) together with his mother, stepfather, two brothers and elder brother Charles's wife.

== New Zealand landowner ==
His elder brother, Charles Reid (1828-1897), established himself in national financial circles helping to found (in 1874) and running Standard Fire and Marine Insurance Company of New Zealand which rapidly established offices throughout Australia and New Zealand and in London. Hugh Reid (1838-1905), the other brother, became a farmer in North Otago.

Donald also aspired to become a farmer and began by leasing land at Caversham. Before he turned 20 he had purchased a block at Caversham and soon began taking on contract cartage work for the goldfields and grazing cattle on more leased land on the Taieri. He made his first purchase there, in North Taieri, aged 23 and that formed the base from which he was to develop and expand his Salisbury estate where he lived for 56 years. When Donald Reid died in 1919 the estate comprised 6,300 acres freehold and over 2,000 acres of that was on the fertile Taieri Plain. The day-to-day management was left to senior employees, some of the land was in tenant farms.

In spite of his personal success he opposed the buying up of land by pastoralists and estate owners instead becoming a political champion of land seekers, farmers and other small settlers. Reid was instrumental in the passing of 1872 government regulations which assisted the settlement of land still under government ownership by requiring only a small deposit and deferral of further payment until the settler was better established.

== Political career ==
New Zealand Parliament
Years	Term	Electorate	Party
1866–1869	4th	Taieri	Independent
1871–1875	5th	Taieri	Independent
1875–1878	6th	Taieri	Independent

Reid represented Taieri on the Otago Provincial Council from 1863 to 1876. In the 1871 election, he unsuccessfully contested the superintendency against James Macandrew.

He represented the Taieri electorate from 1866 to 1869 when he resigned, and from 1871 to 1878, when he again resigned. Never an enthusiastic politician, he was not at ease with the compromises required for political leadership, Reid then left public life — aside from a period on the Otago Harbour Board.

One of Reid's sons, also called Donald Reid, also represented the Taieri electorate (1902–1908).

== Donald Reid & Co ==
After leaving politics, believing the farming outlook to be poor, Reid turned to business. He founded Donald Reid and Company, a stock agency, in 1878, operating from High Street, Dunedin, and with warehousing in nearby Vogel Street. His new enterprise grew rapidly into one of the Province's principal agricultural supply and commerce firms which he transferred to a private joint stock company in 1900. Reid retained a major position in the company into his eighties, finally retiring in 1918. The company, later known as Donald Reid Otago Farmers and since the 1970s as Reid Farmers, was eventually taken over by Pyne Gould Guinness in 2001.

== Death ==
Reid died at his home in Abbotsford, a suburb of Dunedin, on 7 February 1919.

He had been married twice. His first wife, Frances Reid (née Barr, married 1 December 1854) died on 4 November 1868. There were four sons and four daughters from this marriage. His second wife, Sarah Reid (née Price, married 18 March 1874) was a widow with two sons – they had one daughter. Sarah died in 1905.

== Salisbury ==
Donald Reid's house, Salisbury, (now 141 Wairongoa Road, North Taieri, Dunedin) near Mosgiel was built as a small residence in 1863 then enlarged in 1873 to the design of Victorian architect Robert Arthur Lawson. Heritage New Zealand has graded the house and its fixtures and fittings "Historic Place Category 2".

New Zealand Parliament
New constituency	Member of Parliament for Taieri; 1866–1869; 1871–1878	Succeeded by Henry Howorth
Preceded by Henry Howorth	Member of Parliament for Taieri; 1866–1869; 1871–1878	Succeeded by William Cutten
