= Mosgiel Woollen Mill =

Coordinates: 45°52′19.96″S 170°21′25.54″E

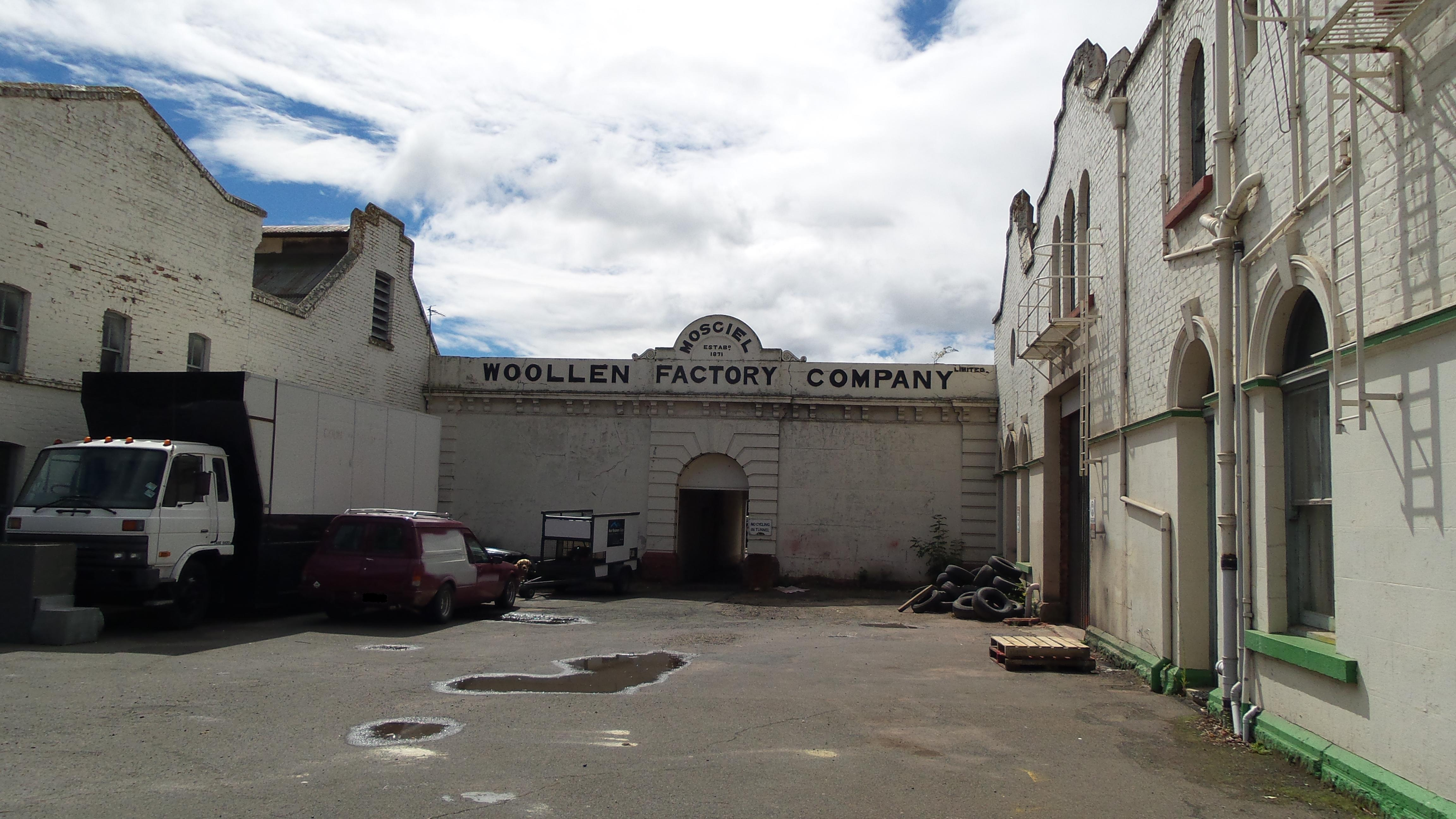
The Mosgiel woollen mill.

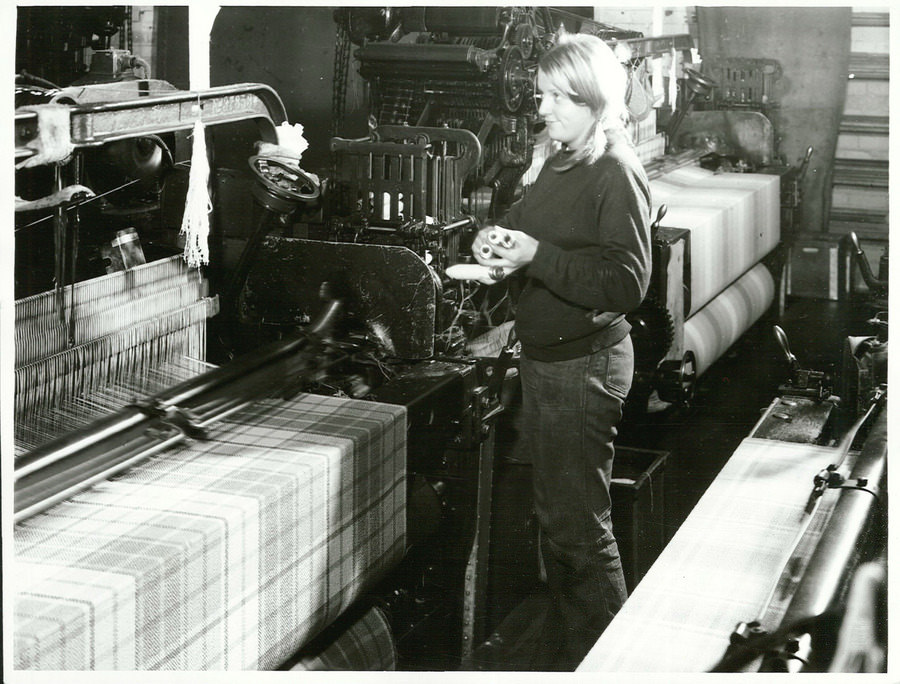
Blanket looms, 1974

The Mosgiel Woollen Mill is situated in Mosgiel, Dunedin, New Zealand, and was opened in 1871.

The Mosgiel Woollen Mill was the second woollen mill to open in New Zealand. The mill was integral to the town and a significant employer from when it opened until the end of the 20th century when it closed.

Frank W. Boreham described the mill in his 1916 book Faces in the Fire:

During my twelve years at Mosgiel, I often went through the great woollen factory. The machines were marvellous—simply marvellous. As you watched the needles slip in and out, or stood beside the loom and saw the pattern grow, it really looked as though the things were bewitched. They seemed to be doing it all "of their own accord." But one day the manager said, "Would you care to see the power-house?" And he took me away from the busy looms to another building altogether, and there I saw the huge engines that drove everything. Neither looms nor needles really work "of their own accord."

— Faces in the Fire, Pt. 1, Ch. VIII "Angels and Iron Gates", Sect. V

== Notable people ==
Elizabeth Turnbull (1885–1988) – head of her section in the hosier department of the mill
