= John Macfarlane Ritchie =

New Zealand businessman (1842–1912)

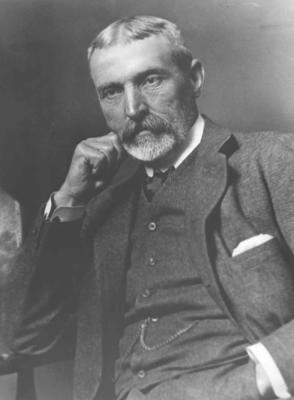
John Macfarlane Ritchie, c.1880

John Macfarlane Ritchie (29 December 1842 – 19 December 1912) was a Scottish-born Otago businessman. He went to New Zealand in 1864 arriving in Dunedin in January 1865 to take up an employment perhaps partnership offer by George Gray Russell. Russell's business was lending money to runholders, shipping their wool and acting as a shipping agent. Russell also acted as an agent for absentee owners. Russell took Ritchie into partnership in 1873 and the business was renamed Russell, Ritchie and Company.
