= Stock and station agency =

Agency providing business support to farmers

Stock and station agencies are businesses which provide a support service to the agricultural community. Their staff who deal with clients are known as stock and station agents. (Note: In his book Simon Ville states: "The term stock and station agent is variously defined as the buying and selling of rural properties and stock or dealing in land, products and supplies, Macquarie Dictionary (2nd edn, Sydney, 1988), p 985, Australian Concise Oxford Dictionary (2nd end, Melbourne, 1992) p 1141. However the business of most leading agents was much wider than this. The terms "pastoral" or "farming" agent might better convey the broad meaning. The three terms are used interchangeably in this book (The Rural Entrepreneurs) as was the practice of the firms themselves." Simon Ville, page 219, The Rural Entrepreneurs Cambridge University Press, 2000. ISBN 0521642655) They advise and represent farmers and graziers in business transactions that involve livestock, wool, fertilizer, rural property and equipment and merchandise on behalf of their clients. The number and importance of these businesses fell in the late 20th century.

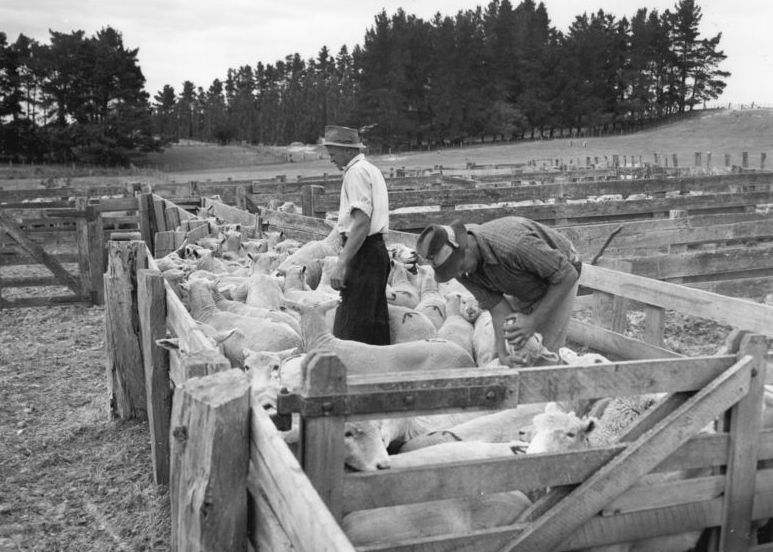
Longridge Settlement – inspecting sheep. Archives New Zealand. A stock-agent assessing his client's livestock

These rural business services institutions originated, when communications were slow and often very difficult, to cope with the double remoteness of early Australian and New Zealand primary producers from their nearest settlement and, particularly in the case of wool, from their overseas markets. In practice, they were the pastoralist's banker. Similar and sometimes the same organization's operated in Latin America and the Midwestern United States, which had extensive pastoral farming.

== Industry ==
- Stock refers to livestock, its purchase and sale.
- Station refers to a facility equipped with special equipment and personnel for a particular purpose—in this case in Australasia—for pastoral industry, see Australia: Stations and New Zealand: Stations. The same word was used for a defensible residence constructed on the American frontier during the early nineteenth century.
- They operate as the agent of their client, on behalf of the particular pastoralist or farmer.

== Company ==
These businesses grew to provide their clients with every product or service they might want right from employees or seasonal working capital to, in the person of a client's personal stock agent, close personal friend and personal confidant who regularly visited them, maintained the client's loyalty and kept them up to date with events in the community and their industry.

His branch manager might often be unable to maintain an easy relationship with clients unable to fulfill their financial obligations. The branch manager's knowledge of his client's business activities was such and his control over the client's spending was such he could ration their spending on sugar and flour.

They also act as local managers of properties on behalf of absentee owners deceased estates and mortgagees technically in possession of properties.

They provide retail stores in small towns for agricultural requirements selling, for example, animal health supplies, animal feed, fencing materials, fertilizer, machinery and tools, and even clothing and groceries.

=== Stock sales ===
An important activity is to organise regular local livestock sales at a community's commercial saleyards. Small rural communities may hold a single annual sale at local saleyards and this may be the highlight of their autumn business and social calendar.

=== Staff in the field ===
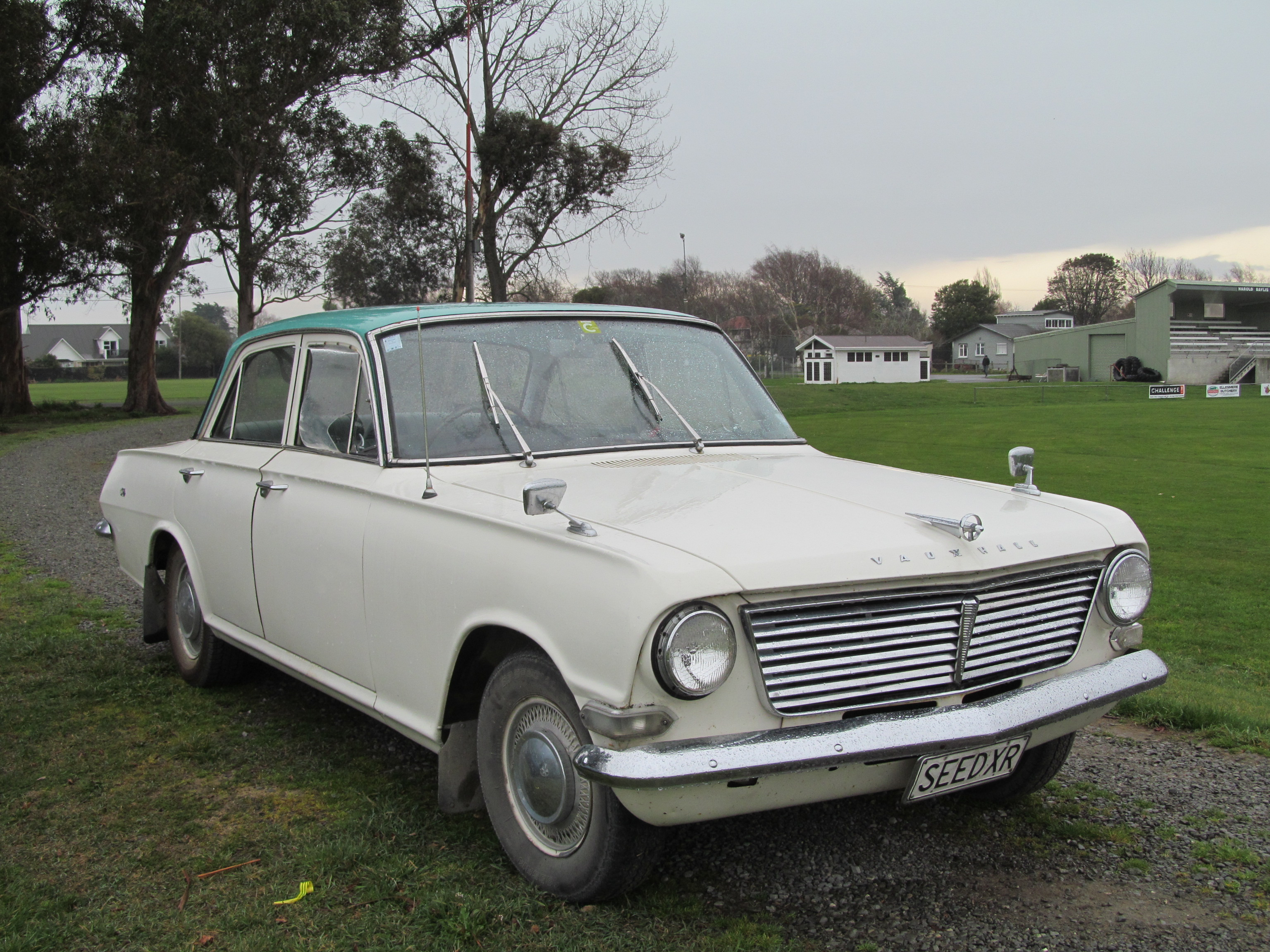
The stock agent's car, of the make that his firm sold and with a radio for catching up-to-date stock prices, was always new, and freshly washed in the morning

A vital part of their rural community, in remote areas, stock agents perform a variety of commercial and social functions. They bring to outlying homesteads on farms and stations stores, mail and newspapers, and local news.

Next the stock agent turns to real work and: reports to his client on market trends and prices; sorts stock into lines for sales; sorts prime animals for the freezing works; values livestock and advises on different marketing options for stock; arranges penning and auction; arranges private sales between sellers and buyers. arranges transport of stock to saleyards; conducts sales of wool on behalf of clients on a commission basis; sells a wide range of agricultural products including chemicals; arranges clearing sales of surplus machinery plant and equipment; and arranges insurance.

He also advises and assists clients in the management of agricultural or pastoral companies, stock or farming problems; arranges finance for the buying of livestock or property; and brings prospective buyers to inspect properties for sale.

=== Specialisations ===
Individual stock agents, within the same agency, may specialise in any one of the preceding activities.

"Arranged marriage: Farmers expect their stock agents to perform a range of tasks and services. One agent even acted as a go-between for a client who wanted to get married but was too shy to propose to the woman!"

The close and enduring individual client relationships which are formed are seen as a forerunner of the newer concept of relationship marketing.

In his history of the industry Simon Ville says: ". . . the stock and station agent has been a legendary figure in local folklore, connected or related to many individuals and groups, a central figure embedded in rural settler communities and about whom everyone has had a view. This social perspective helps inform our understanding of the agent's role and importance in economic activities since trust, reputation, and personal connection were the vital lubricants in sustaining business relationships and networks."

== Some notable examples ==
Some of these businesses grew very large in the 19th and early 20th centuries.

- Johnston & Co.
- The Australian Estates Company Limited
- Dalgety plc (Frederick Dalgety)
- Elder Smith & Co Limited
- Goldsbrough Mort
- Permewan Wright & Co. Ltd.
- Wright Stephenson & Co Limited
- National Mortgage and Agency Company of New Zealand
- New Zealand Loan and Mercantile Agency Company
- Donald Reid Otago Farmers
