= 1933 New Year Honours (New Zealand) =

Annual awards for New Zealanders

The 1933 New Year Honours in New Zealand were appointments by King George V to various orders and honours to reward and highlight good works by New Zealanders. The awards celebrated the passing of 1932 and the beginning of 1933, and were announced on 2 January 1933.

The recipients of honours are displayed here as they were styled before their new honour.

== Knight Bachelor ==
- Alexander Gray KC – of Wellington; president of the New Zealand Law Society.
- William Perry – of Masterton; president of the Royal Agricultural Society of New Zealand.
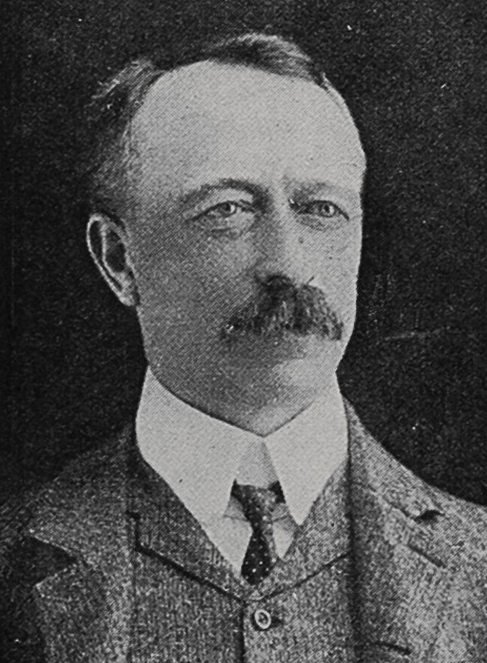
Sir Alexander Gray

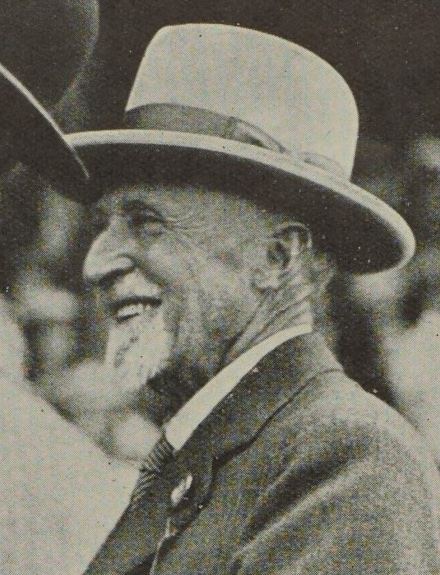
Sir William Perry

== Order of Saint Michael and Saint George ==
=== Companion (CMG) ===
- Robert Sutherland Forsyth – New Zealand representative on the Empire Marketing Board, and representative in the United Kingdom of the New Zealand Meat Producers' Board.
- James Marchbanks MICE – lately general manager, and chief engineer, Wellington Harbour Board.
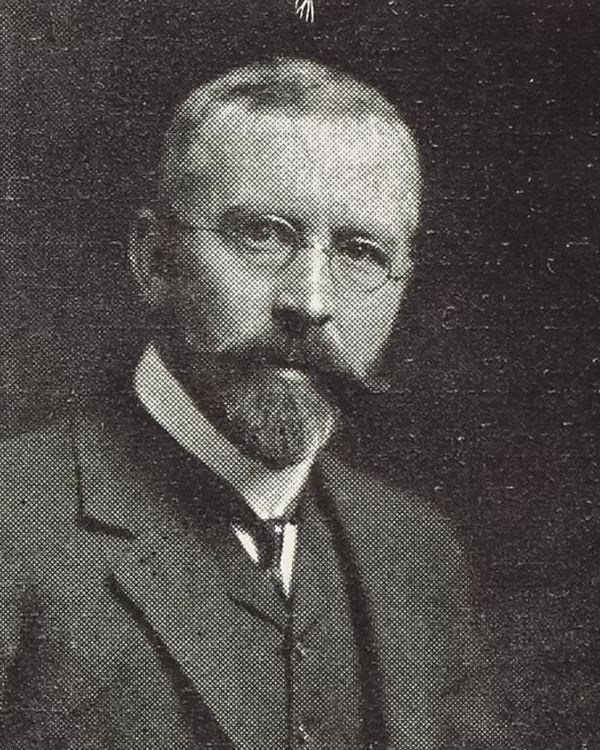
James Marchbanks

== Order of the British Empire ==
=== Commander (CBE) ===
Civil division

- George Percival Newton – of Wellington; formerly under-secretary, Department of Internal Affairs.
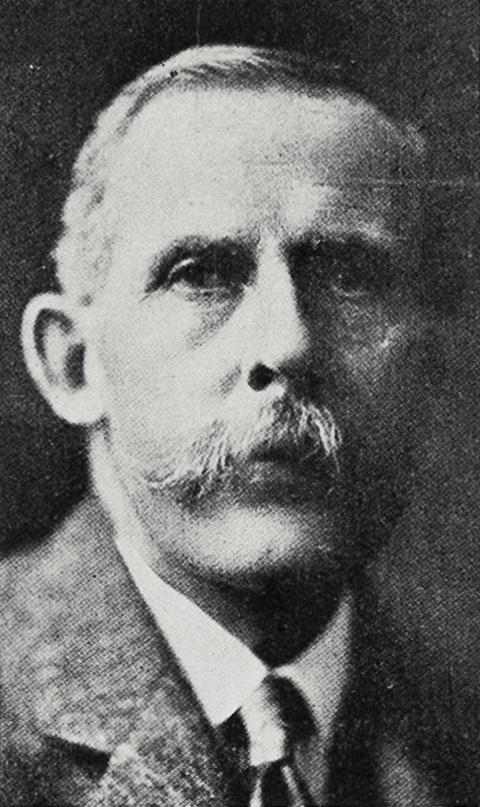
George Percival Newton
