= Frederick Augustus Krull =

Frederick Augustus Krull (born Friedrich August Krull, c. 1836 – 28 November 1914) was a New Zealand businessman and German Consul to New Zealand.

== Early life ==
Krull was born about 1836 in Mecklenburg-Strelitz in Germany. He immigrated to New Zealand in 1858, arriving in Wellington on the Swedish ship Equator on 22 January 1859.

Krull became a naturalised New Zealander in 1862.

== Business and civic life ==
On arrival in Wellington, Krull set himself up as an importer of goods from France, Germany, and Sweden.

Krull was involved in civic affairs in Wellington. He served on the Wellington City Council from 1871, and was a founding member of the Wellington Harbour Board, representing Wairarapa. For many years he was chairman of the Wellington Gas Company, and later became a director of the Wellington Patent Slip Company.

Krull's business went into liquidation. Early in 1886 he moved to Whanganui and joined Jackson's stock and station agents. He was still associated with the firm at the time he died.

Krull Street in Vogeltown, Wellington is named after Krull. In Whanganui there was formerly a Krull Road and Krull Lane, but these were renamed after World War 1. Frederick Krull Reserve in Palmerston North also commemorates Krull, who briefly owned land there.

== Service as consul ==
On 3 July 1861 Krull was appointed as German Consul. At that time there were an estimated 780 German-born people in New Zealand. In 1875 the German emperor made Krull a Companion of the Imperial Order of the Crown for his long service as consul, and in 1889 he was made a chevalier of the Order of the Red Eagle. Krull retired as senior consul in 1911, after 50 years' service.

When World War I began in 1914, the British Government stated that it would no longer recognise consuls representing Germany or Austria-Hungary, and that any consuls of those nationalities should leave British territory. Krull was one of five German consuls visited by police on 10 August 1914, even though he had officially retired three years earlier. The consuls were advised of the new circumstances and told that any further communication with Germany would be a treasonable offence. Consular archives were seized by the police, as the government thought it possible that the archives might contain the names of German army reservists. Three of the consuls had their naturalisation cancelled and were interned. Krull suffered a stroke, which his family believed was a consequence of stress caused by the war, and died on 28 November 1914.
