= Wellington Gas Company =

New Zealand coal gas company

The Wellington Gas Company
- Company type: Public, listed
- Industry: Coal gas
- Founded: 1 December 1869; 155 years ago in Wellington, New Zealand
- Defunct: 1980
- Successor: Natural gas supplied by Powerco and Nova Energy
- Headquarters: Wellington, New Zealand
- Area served: Wellington city
- Key people: J. Rees George; M. J. Kennedy
- Products: Coal gas and gas appliances

Wellington Gas Company Limited, a public listed company, supplied coal gas to Wellington, New Zealand's industrial and domestic consumers from April 1871. The gas provided both lighting and heating.

Coal gas was replaced by natural gas first piped from onshore wells at Kapuni, Taranaki in 1970.

== A new enterprise ==
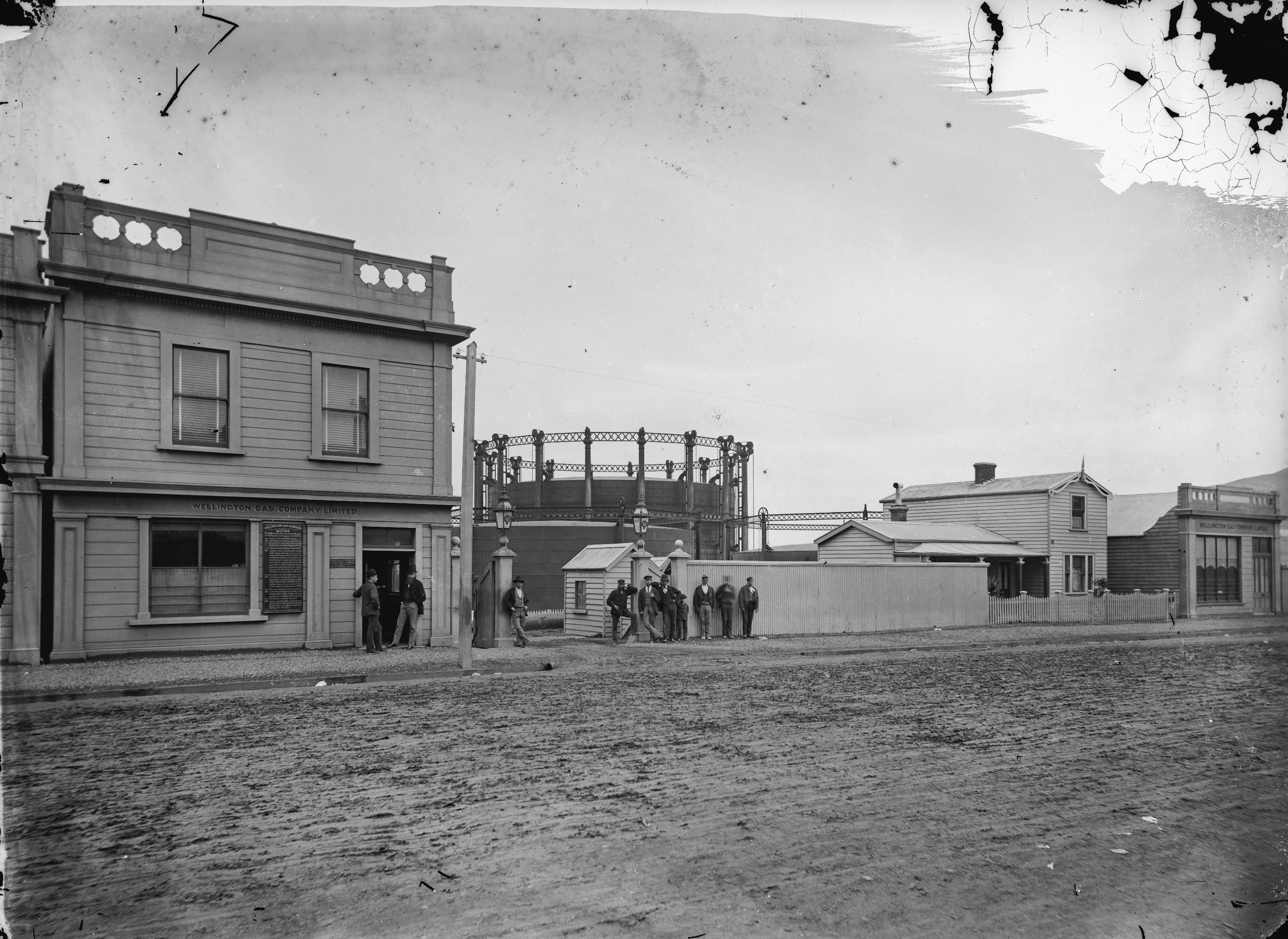
Offices, depot entrance and gasholders, Courtenay Place 1879

The gas company's promoters first met in December 1869 inspired by the proposals of local engineer J Rees George, son-in-law of John Martin. The provisional board were W. B. Rhodes, C. J. Pharazyn, J. Johnston, Frederick Krull and T. M. Stewart. Pharazyn was made the first chairman and George the first manager and engineer. J. E. Nathan, W. H. Levin, Edward Pearce and A. P. Stewart joined the other promoters to make the first board of directors. It was empowered by the Wellington Gas Company Act 1870 to supply coal gas through pipelines and other facilities which might require breaking up Wellington's public streets and opening its drains.

The company constructed its coal to gas and coke plant and four gasometers on 3½ acres of reclaimed land just north of Courtenay Place, and the town was first lit by gas on 21 April 1871. Ownership of a small block of shares entitled a domestic consumer to a substantial discount on their gas bill as well as a dividend. Accordingly the shares were very widely held.

In 1898 the company built a new head office building on the corner of Tory Street and Courtenay Place, beside the gasworks. The two-storey masonry head office building was used by the gas company until 1992, and is heritage-listed by Wellington City Council. As of 2025 the Wellington Gas Company's building is occupied by a KFC restaurant. New gasworks in Miramar had been finished in the winter of 1912, and much of the site in Courtenay Place was sold off soon after World War 1.

== Manufacture ==
Coal gas is manufactured by the process of destructive distillation of coal in a retort leaving a residue of coke. Destructive distillation of a tonne of coal can produce 400 m^{3} of coal gas, 700 kg of coke, 100 litres of liquor ammonia and 50 litres of coal tar.

=== Courtenay Place ===
At Courtenay Place the coal was shovelled by hand into horizontal retorts made of fireclay. Very hot fires distilled the coal gas from the coal inside the retort and left the glowing coke behind. Extraction of the coke by long iron rakes required the gas-worker to face the white hot coke and pull it out towards him with the rake. To be a gas-worker a man had to be strong physically and constitutionally and this part of the work was very arduous.

=== Miramar ===
Coal was shipped from mines at Newcastle, New South Wales and on the West Coast to Miramar Wharf in Evans Bay. It was trucked by rail a short distance to the company's gasworks through a cutting in the concealing range of hills.

Only a handful of men were required to work Miramar's retorts, vertical bottles of fireclay opened at both top and bottom when required. The coal went in automatically from overhead bunkers and stayed in the retort about twelve hours by which time all the gas had been driven out of it and the residue was pure coke or carbon. With vertical retorts there was no drawing out of the hot coke by iron rake. Instead, the gas worker operated a few levers, turned a handle, and away came a torrent of incandescent coke falling into an automatic conveyor under a heavy spray of water.

The gas had to undergo several processes of cleansing and purification before it was added to the gasholder. It went first to the condenser where the gas passed through water which removed most of the tar. A big rotary extractor next took the remainder of the tar and the ammonia. Finally, to remove the sulphur, which comes through from the coal in the shape of sulphuretted hydrogen, the gas was pumped through water containing quantities of red oxide of iron.

The automatic conveyors and other appliances were powered by electricity generated on site by three gas engines, other equipment was powered by separate small steam engines.

Activities included the manufacture of cookers, bath heaters, washing coppers, arc lamps, gas fires, circulators, toasters etc.

== Electricity ==
Electric light was introduced to Wellington in 1889 but it seemed to have little effect on the growth of gas consumption.

== Natural gas ==
Coal gas was replaced by natural gas first piped from onshore wells at Kapuni, Taranaki in 1970.

Natural gas is currently transmitted from Taranaki by distributor Powerco to Wellington retailer Energy Online.

== Other places ==
- 1864 Christchurch
- 1865 Auckland
- 1869 Wellington
- 1871 Greymouth
- 1874 Hokitika
- 1875 Invercargill
- 1875 Timaru
- 1875 Napier
- 1976 Oamaru
- 1877 Wanganui
- 1887 Masterton
- 1888 Palmerston North
- 1900 Petone
