= William Levin =

New Zealand politician (1845–1893)

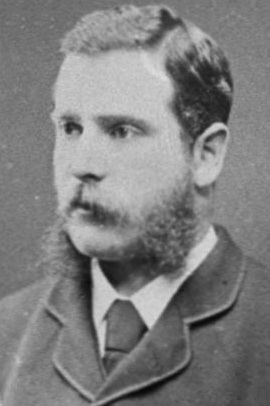
Levin circa 1882

William Hort Levin (7 August 1845 – 15 September 1893) was a 19th-century merchant, philanthropist and politician who lived in Wellington, New Zealand.

== Levin & Co ==
Levin was born in Wellington, New Zealand, the son of English-born parents, Jessie (Hort) and Nathaniel William Levin (1819–1903), who were both Jewish. From Wellington, he ran the business W H Levin and Co, a stock and station agency and general mercantile suppliers founded there in 1841 by his father. W H Levin took over the business in 1868 aged only 22 when his father prepared for his own permanent return to London though it was in the event delayed until 1869. His first partners (for a ten-year term to March 1878) were C J Pharazyn, who withdrew early in 1871, and W W Johnston. After that he conducted the business on his own account as W H Levin until 1889 when he took in Edward Pearce and John Duncan as partners, both had previously managed the business, and it was renamed Levin & Co.

His death brought the four-year-old partnership a serious problem. Neither son wanted to go into their father's business. Finally, near three years later, a buyer with the necessary capital was found in Dunedin. In March 1896 Mr Ritchie of the National Mortgage and Agency Company of New Zealand settled current rumours by announcing that his company had taken an interest in a new company, Levin & Co Limited, formed to take over the old established business of Levin & Co. Ritchie advised that the management would remain under the control of the old partners as well as the Levin family.

== Notable external directorships ==
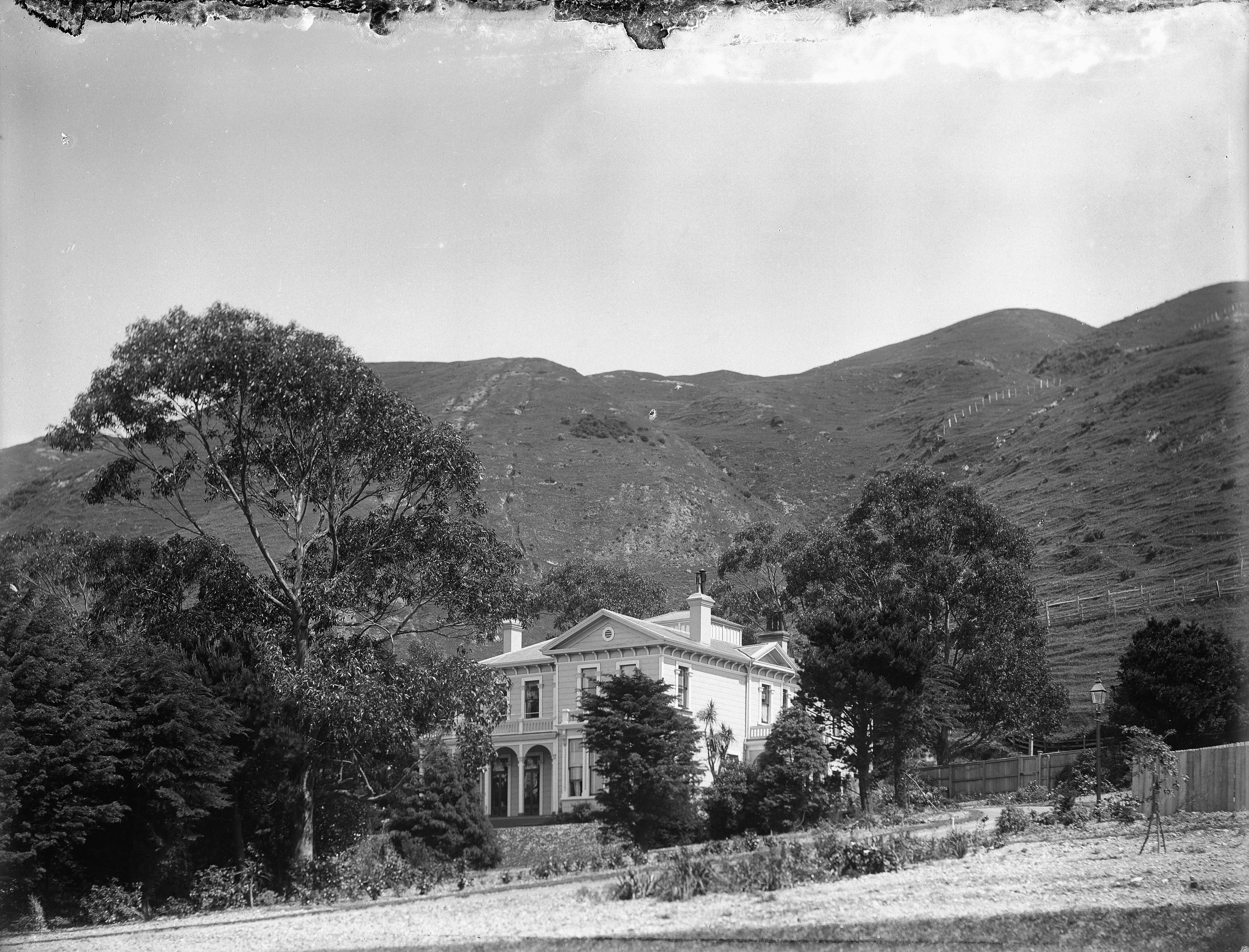
W. H. Levin's house in Tinakori Road, Wellington. Pendennis

- Patent Slip Company
- Wellington Trust and Loan Company
- Colonists' Land and Loan Association
- National Mutual Life Assurance Association
- Wellington Harbour Board, first chairman

=== Levin ===
W H Levin was one of the directors of the Wellington and Manawatu Railway Company. The railway company named or renamed some of the stops on its railway line after its directors, Plimmer, Shannon, Levin and Linton.

== Politics ==
New Zealand Parliament
Years	Term	Electorate	Party
1879–1881	7th	Wellington	Independent
1881–1884	8th	Thorndon	Independent

He represented two Wellington electorates, first the City of Wellington electorate from 1879 to 1881, and then the Thorndon electorate from 1881 to 1884, when he resigned due to ill-health.

Levin served on the Wellington City Council and the Wellington Harbour Board, and was known for his public benefactions.

== Early death ==
Well-liked and a capable businessman, Levin's health had never been strong. He died suddenly at his home on Tinakori Road aged 48 on 15 September 1893, leaving his wife, Amy, daughter of James Edward Fitzgerald and four young children; two sons and two daughters. Learning of his death Parliament closed until the evening session after valedictory speeches. Flags were flown at half-mast by consulates (Levin represented the United States in New Zealand) and businesses and a special theatrical performance was indefinitely postponed.

He promoted many social and charitable organisations in the Wellington region as well as his business activities.

Political offices
New title	Chair of Wellington Harbour Board; 1880–1881	Succeeded by William Valentine Jackson
