= Edward Pearce (politician) =

New Zealand politician

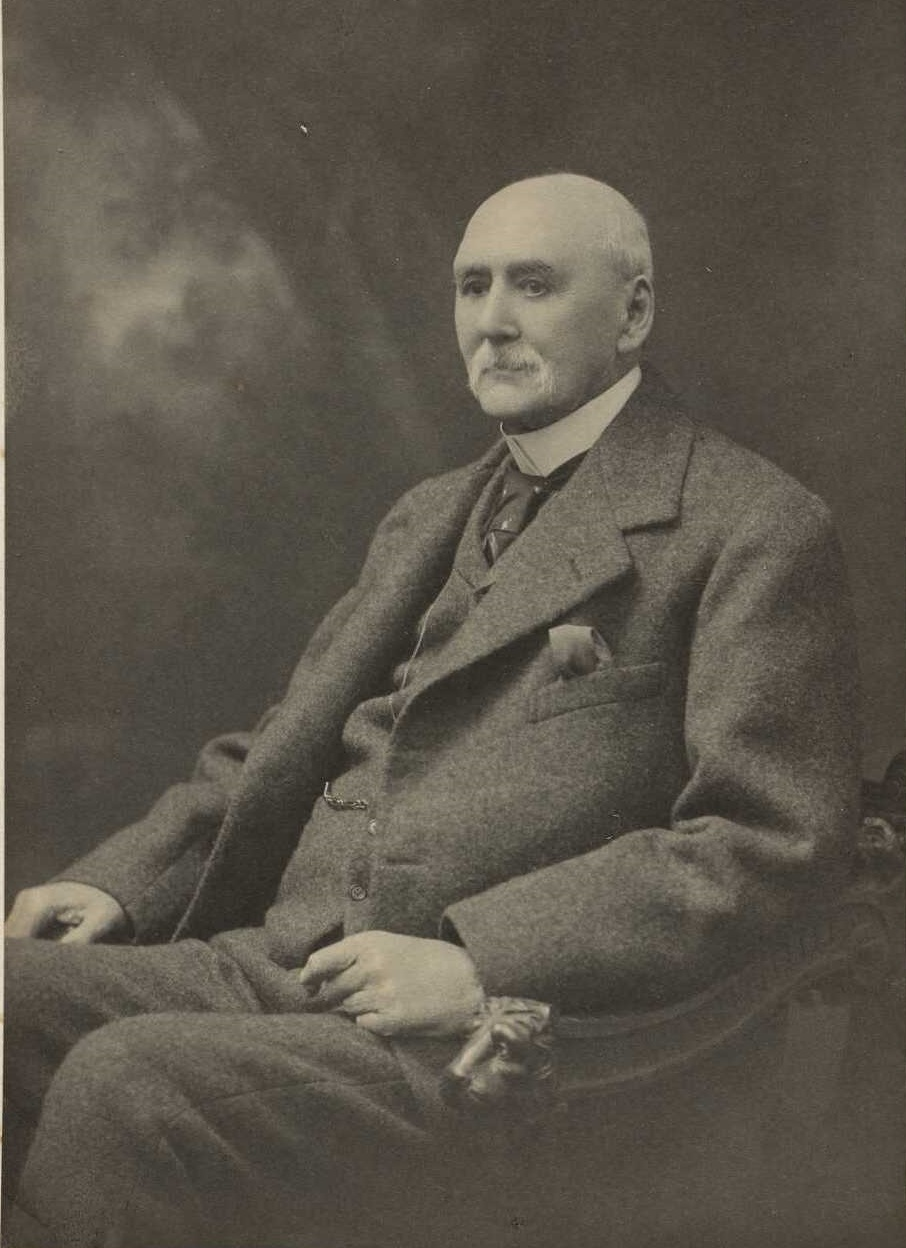
Edward Pearce, November 1915 aged 83

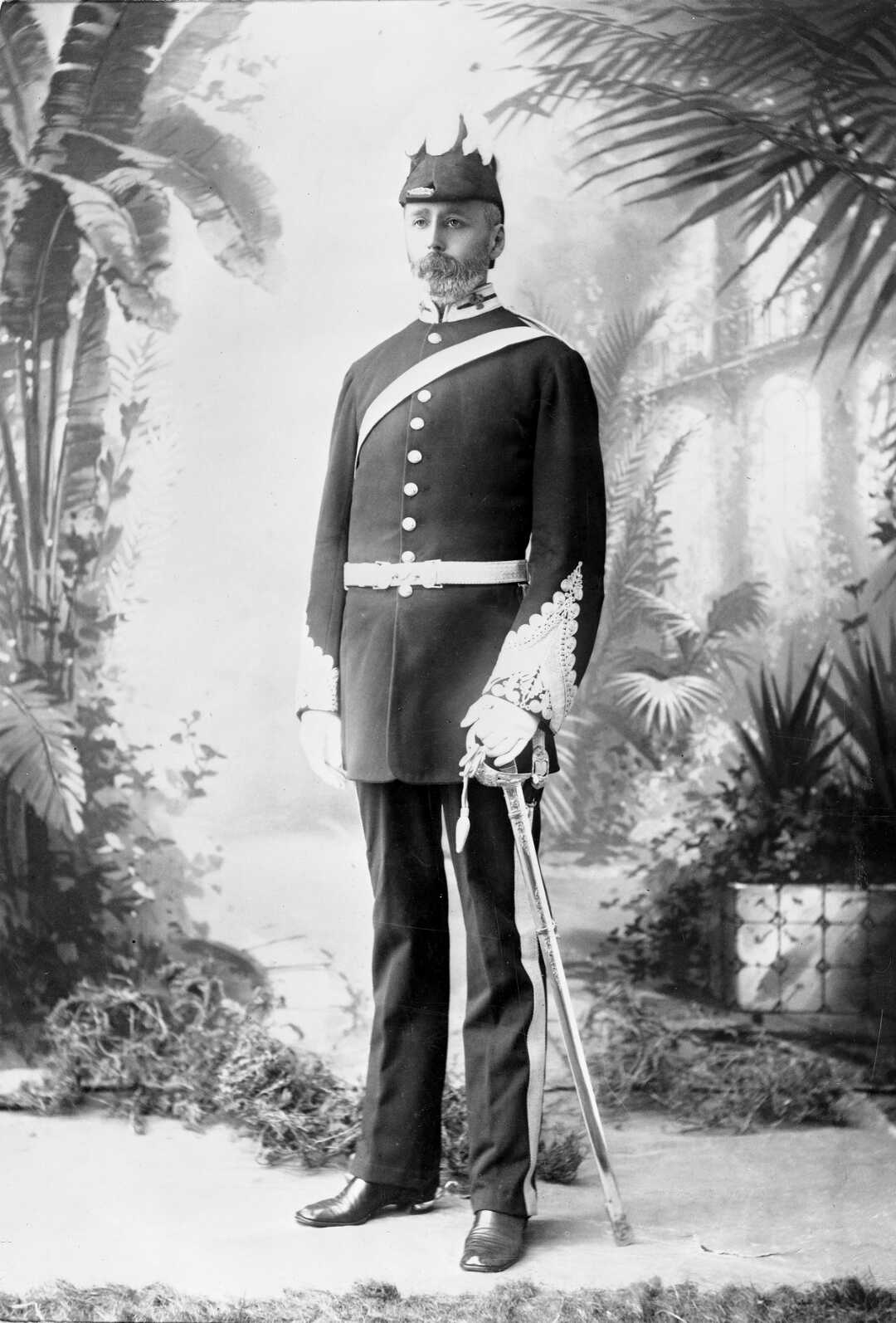
Lieutenant Colonel Edward Pearce circa 1885

Edward Pearce (22 February 1833 – 13 October 1922) was a leading merchant who based himself in Wellington, New Zealand from 1861 to 1899.

He arrived in New Zealand in 1861 and returned to England after 1899 leaving his sons in charge of his business, Levin & Co. He died at Cheltenham, England, on 13 October 1922.

== Own account ==
Pearce, his wife born Henrietta Diana Cox and their infant eldest son, cabin passengers, arrived in Wellington on the Wild Duck's regular Wellington run from London in mid-January 1861. They had married 18 months earlier in Belize. He had arranged to take a partnership in a substantial Wellington business but after some months proved it to be insolvent. He was licensed as a customs agent in January 1863.

In 1866 he formed a group of businessmen: Edward Pearce, W B Rhodes, George Hunter, W M Bannatyne, George Moore, George Hart and F.A. Krull to set up a gas company in Wellington.

In Wellington he formed one of the port's principal shipping agencies and in addition conducted a large import and export trade until the opportunity arose for expansion by acquisition.

== Levin & Co ==
In 1889 he amalgamated his business with W. H. Levin's and John Duncan's Messrs Levin & Co. W. H Levin died in 1894 and Pearce became senior partner. Following his retirement his three sons assumed management of Levin & Co. Though Pearces and Levins retained their various involvements control of the business moved to National Mortgage and Agency Company of New Zealand in 1896.

== Army ==
Lieutenant-Colonel Pearce commanded the New Zealand Regiment of Artillery which had twelve batteries throughout the country. He retired in 1885.

== National Bank ==
Pearce was the local (Wellington) director of the National Bank of New Zealand from the opening of the Wellington branch in 1873 and in 1883 with Dunedin's James Rattray was appointed one of two New Zealand directors. Another directorship of national significance was chairmanship of the New Zealand board of the National Mutual Life Assurance Association. Among other directorships he was for many years chairman of: Wellington Patent Slip Co Limited, Wellington Gas Company Limited and Wellington Trust Loan and Investment Co Limited.

== Member of Parliament ==
New Zealand Parliament
Years	Term	Electorate	Party
1871–1875	5th	City of Wellington	Independent
1875–1877	6th	City of Wellington	Independent

A member of the Provincial Executive during Dr Featherston's administration he stood unsuccessfully in the 1865 by-election for Wairarapa then represented the City of Wellington electorate from 1871 to 1877, when he resigned.

He was the Government appointed member of the Wellington Harbour Board for 16 years from its first constitution and was appointed chairman for 5 years.

== Death ==
He was survived by four sons, G.F. Pearce who was Managing Director of Levin and Co., his three youngest sons Charles and William also with Levin and Co., Alexander farming near Featherstone, and two daughters, Florence whose husband Capt. Edward Dowell of Kent was Commander of P&O, and Helen married to Henry Duncan Crawford, son of Coutts Crawford. He out lived four more sons, the oldest of which went down in the disastrous 1877 collision in the English Channel between Shaw Saville's "Avalanche" and the American ship "Forest".

Political offices
Preceded by William Valentine Jackson	Chair of Wellington Harbour Board; 1883–1887	Succeeded by John Duthie
New Zealand Parliament
Preceded by William Waring Taylor; Isaac Featherston; Charles Borlase	Member of Parliament for City of Wellington; 1871–1877; Served alongside: George Hunter	Succeeded by William Travers
