= Joseph Nathan =

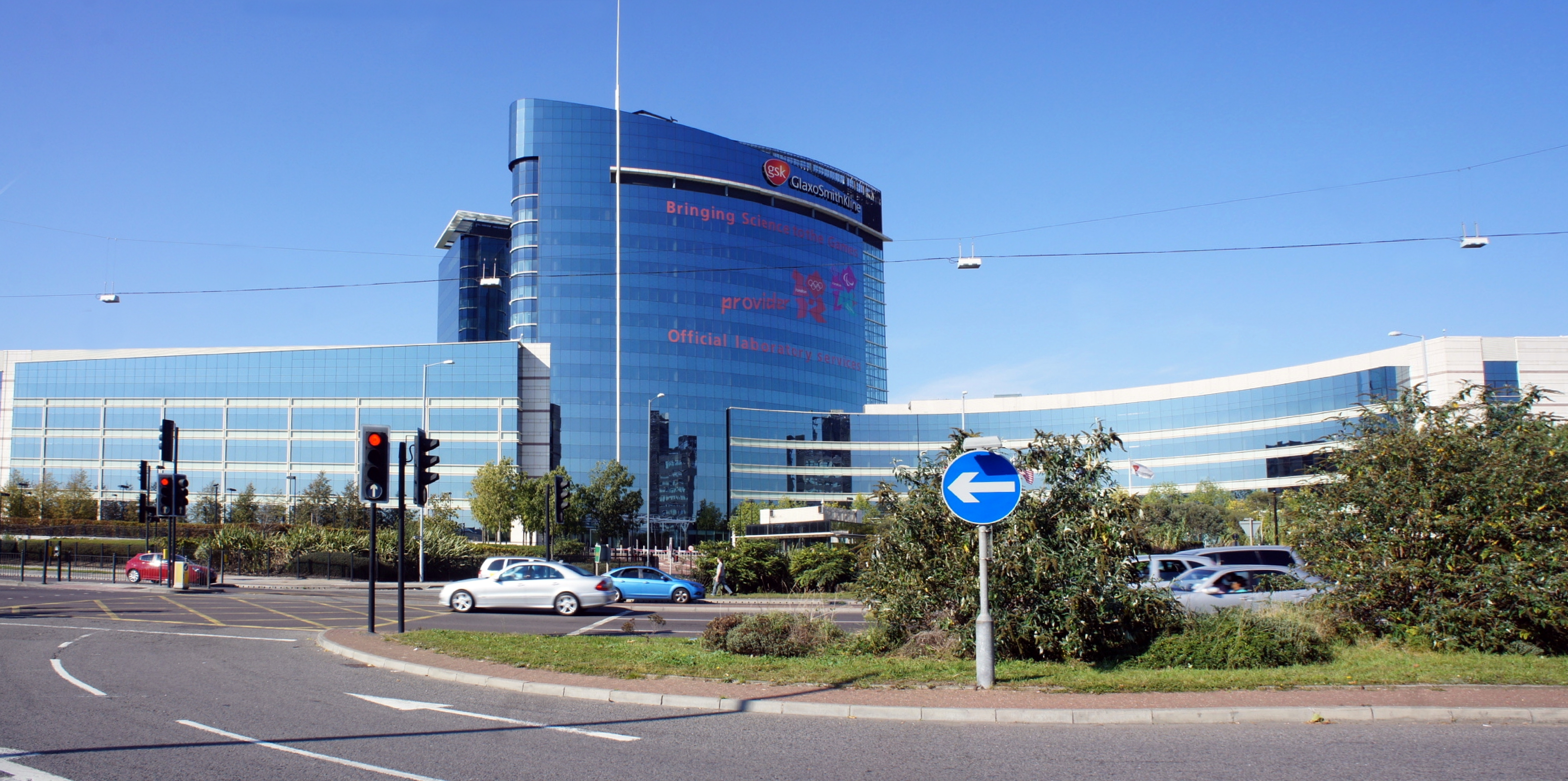
GlaxoSmithKline global headquarters Brentford, London 2011

Wellington headquarters opened 1874

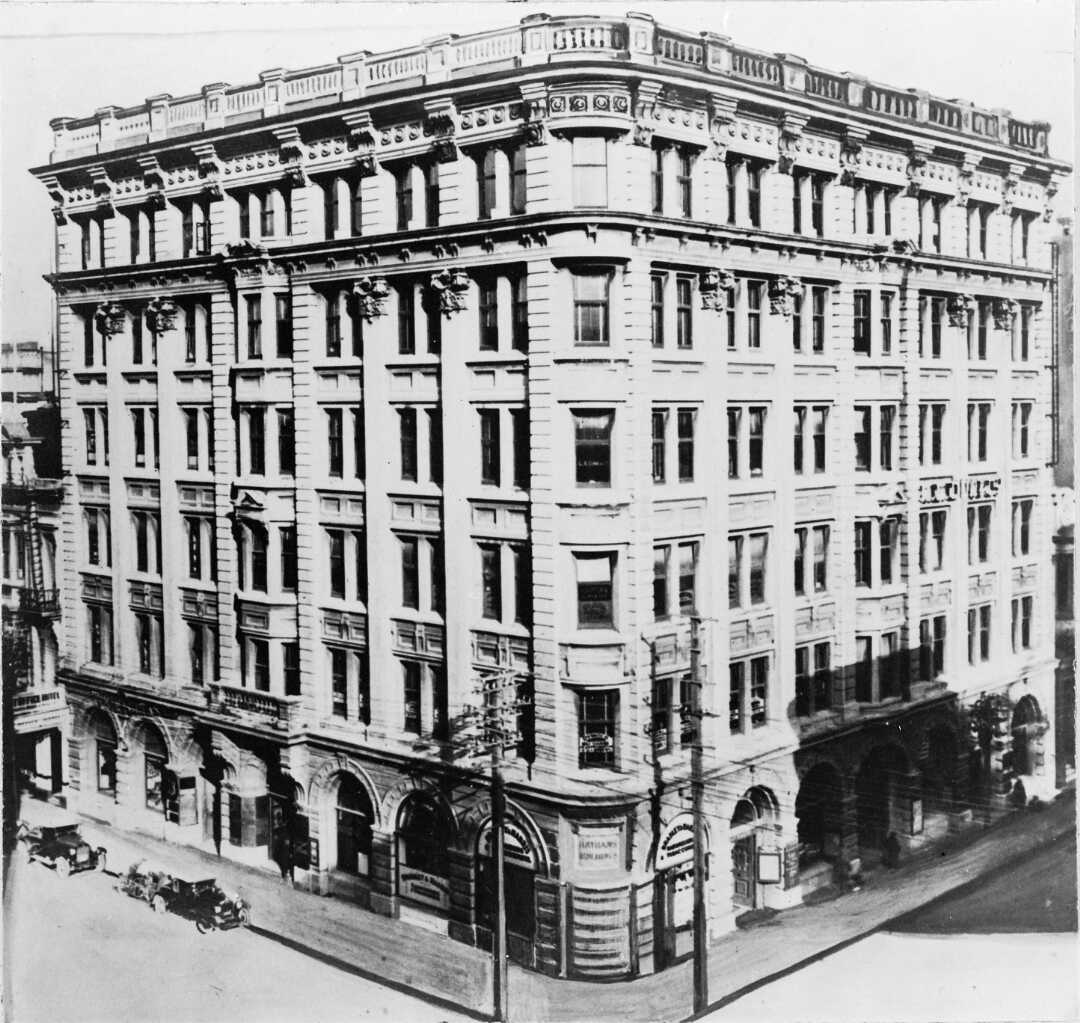
new building, same Wellington site, opened 1907

Joseph Edward Nathan (1835 – 2 May 1912) was a London-born New Zealand merchant, dairy manufacturer and exporter. A successful businessman, he returned to London in 1887 after 30 years in New Zealand.

The business he founded has become GlaxoSmithKline, as of 2015 the world's seventh largest pharmaceutical company, a global researcher, developer and manufacturer of pharmaceutical medicines, vaccines and other healthcare products.

== Joseph Nathan & Co ==
The 6th son and 8th child of London tailor, Edward Ezekiel Nathan and his wife born Rachel Davis, he emigrated to Australia in 1853 at the time of the Victorian gold rush and opened a store in central Melbourne supplying goldminers. He married Dinah Marks in Melbourne just before moving to New Zealand at the end of 1857 to join his sister's husband's importing business, Jacob Joseph & Co. They later bought in locally produced wool for export. Jacob Joseph retired in 1873 and Joseph Nathan bought the business and continued operating it now under the name Joseph Nathan & Co. The growth of the business can be seen from the size of the Wellington headquarters building opened in 1874, and its replacement built on the same site on the south-east corner of Featherston and Grey Streets in 1907. The building was demolished in 1974 to make way for an AMP Limited regional headquarters.

== Other activities in Wellington ==
Nathan seems to have avoided any political involvements. His directorships included Wellington Patent Slip Company, Wellington and Wairarapa Grand Trunk Railway Company, Wellington Gas Company, New Zealand Candle Company and the Wellington Woollen Manufacturing Company. He was also president of the Wellington Chamber of Commerce, helped create the Wellington Harbour Board and was first chairman of the Wellington and Manawatu Railway Company.

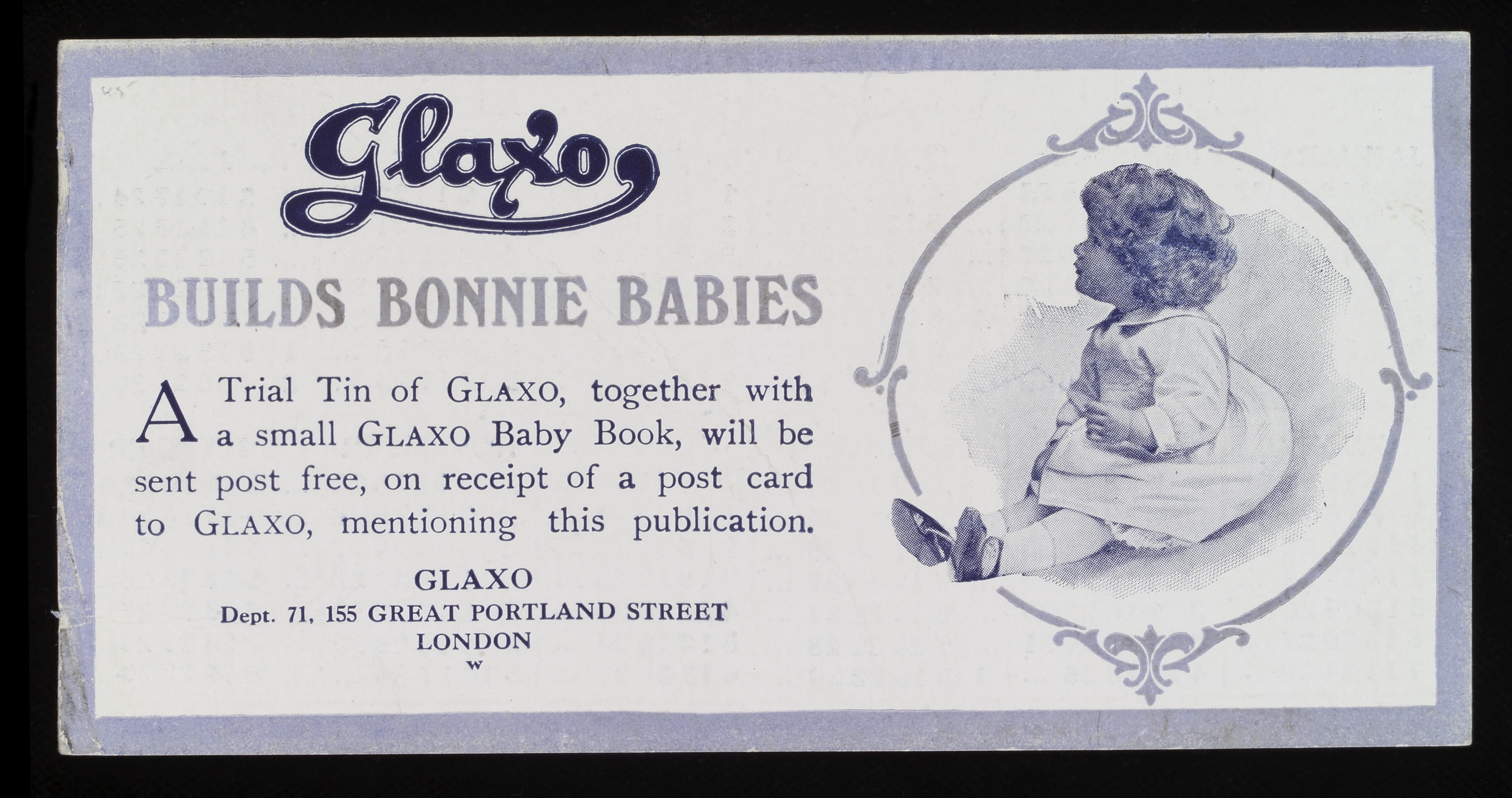

== Joseph Nathan & Co Limited — Glaxo dried milk ==
From 1887 Joseph Nathan and his wife lived in England and in July 1899 ownership of his business was transferred "for family reasons" to Joseph Nathan & Company Limited a company incorporated in England. It was required to register as a public company in 1913 but there was no listing for dealing in shares.

Joseph Nathan & Co became best known for its New Zealand made dried cow's milk product, Glaxo, a baby food developed in the early twentieth century. Its brand-name was registered in England in October 1906.

Following the First World War preference shares were offered to the public in 1919 and they were listed by the London Stock Exchange. Vitamin supplements were added to the range of products.

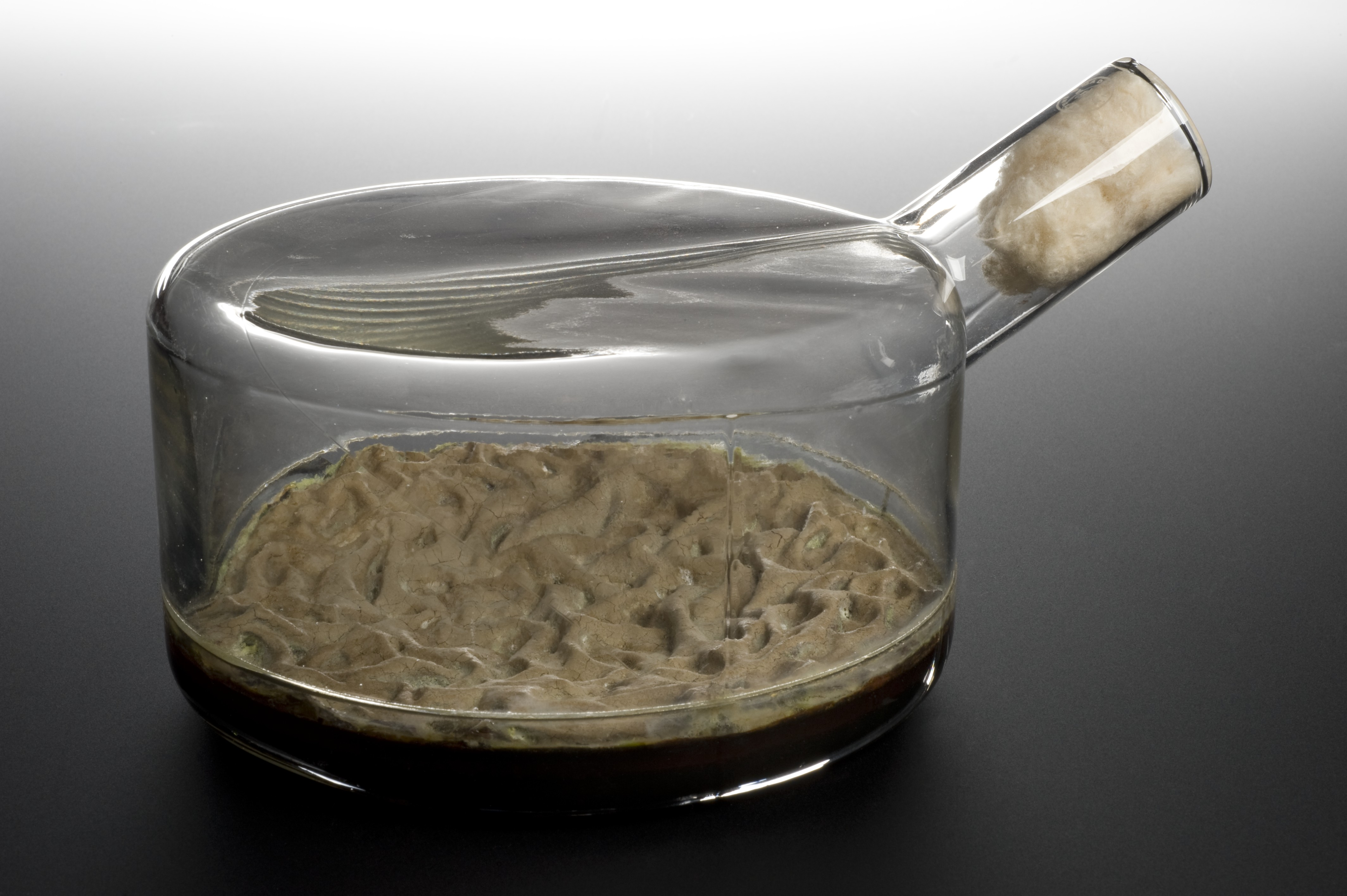
Glaxo penicillin fermentation vessel 1940s

== Glaxo Laboratories Limited ==
In late 1935 a new wholly owned subsidiary company was formed to take over the assets of the various Glaxo laboratories departments. New factories, laboratories and offices were completed that year at Greenford, Middlesex and pharmaceuticals including penicillin were added to Glaxo's range. Soon after the Second World War shareholders liquidated Joseph Nathan & Co Limited buying, in early 1947, its subsidiary Glaxo Laboratories. Glaxo was floated on the London Stock Exchange the following month.

Glaxo became the core of one of the world's largest pharmaceutical companies GlaxoSmithKline (GSK). Its global headquarters are now four miles south of Greenford at Brentford.

== Later life, death and legacy ==
Nathan's wife died in 1893 and he died on 2 May 1912. They were survived by their four daughters and eight sons. The sons were involved in the management of the various businesses run from Palmerston North, Wellington and London.

In 2008, Nathan was posthumously inducted into the New Zealand Business Hall of Fame.

He is buried at Willesden Jewish Cemetery.
