= Evans Bay Patent Slip =

New Zealand marine railway

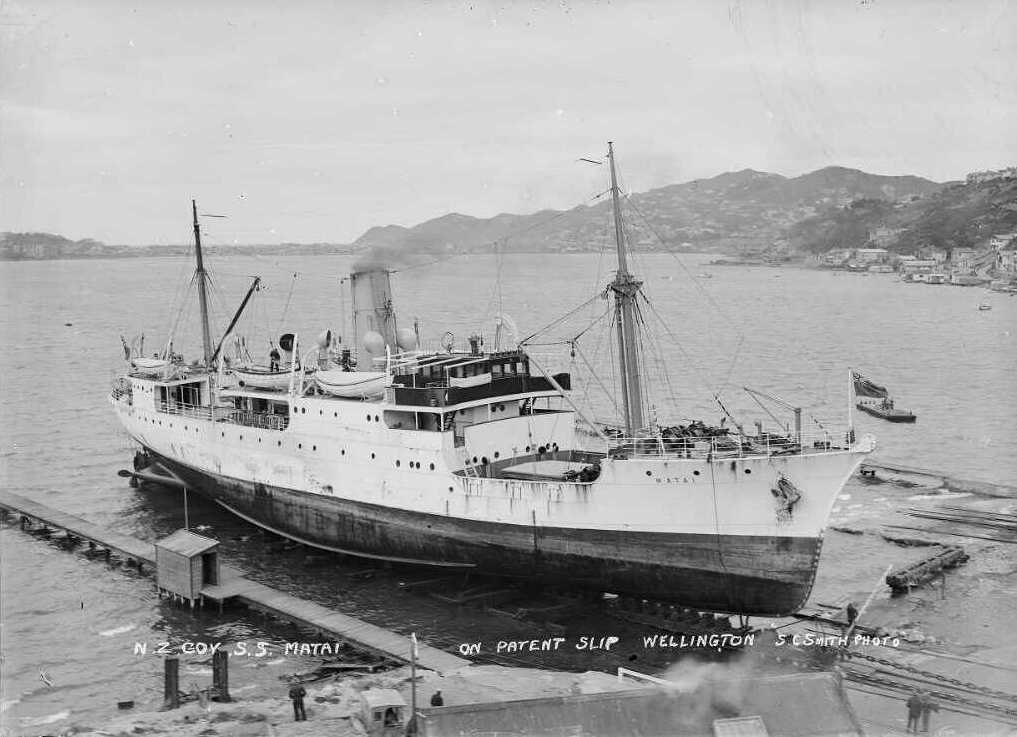
- NZGSS Matai, on Patent Slip at Evans Bay
- Interactive map of Evans Bay Patent Slip
- 41°18′15.1″S 174°48′07.4″E
- Nearest city: Wellington

History
- Built: 1863
- Demolished: 1980

Site notes
- Current use: Public park
- Owner: Wellington City Council

Heritage New Zealand – Category 2
- Designated: 25 November 1982
- Reference no.: 2895

The Evans Bay Patent Slip is a heritage site of the former patent slip located in Evans Bay, in Wellington Harbour in the North Island of New Zealand. The first slipway on the site was commissioned in May 1863 to enable maintenance of the hulls of small vessels. The Wellington Provincial Council was keen to encourage shipping trade by improving facilities in Wellington Harbour and began planning later in 1863 for the construction of a larger patent slip. A concession was granted for the supply, construction and operation of a patent slip on the site. Equipment for the new slip was delivered in 1865 and 1866, but construction was delayed for several years because of a contractual dispute concerning the suitability of the design for the ground conditions. The original suppliers lost a court case and withdrew from the project. The Wellington Patent Slip Company was formed to take over the assets, and construction began in 1871. The Patent Slip was officially opened in March 1873.

A second slipway was constructed at the site in 1922. The original slip operated until 1969, and the second was closed on 31 July 1980. Most equipment has been removed from the site, and a residential development now occupies some of the original land. However, the site has been listed as a Category 2 historic place by Heritage New Zealand, and the area is classified as a heritage zone by the Wellington City Council.

== The first slipway ==
In 1863, the New Zealand Steam Navigation Company decided to build a slip at Greta Point in Evans Bay to make it easier to repair and clean ships' hulls. A contract was let to shipwright Edward Thirkell, and by May 1863 the slip was in operation. This first slip was 300 feet (91 m) long, with the upper part being bolted together so that it could be removed from under any ship if necessary. The slip itself consisted of two wooden "slideways" for the keel and the bilge, and the low end sat in eight feet (2.4 m) of water at low tide. Two manually operated winches pulled ships up the runners. Edward Thirkell managed this slip and its successor until his death in 1882. The New Zealand Steam Navigation Company went into liquidation in 1871, and management of the slip passed to the newly formed Patent Slip Company. The wooden slip was in use at least until 1873, when the new slip was built slightly south of it.

== The Patent Slip ==
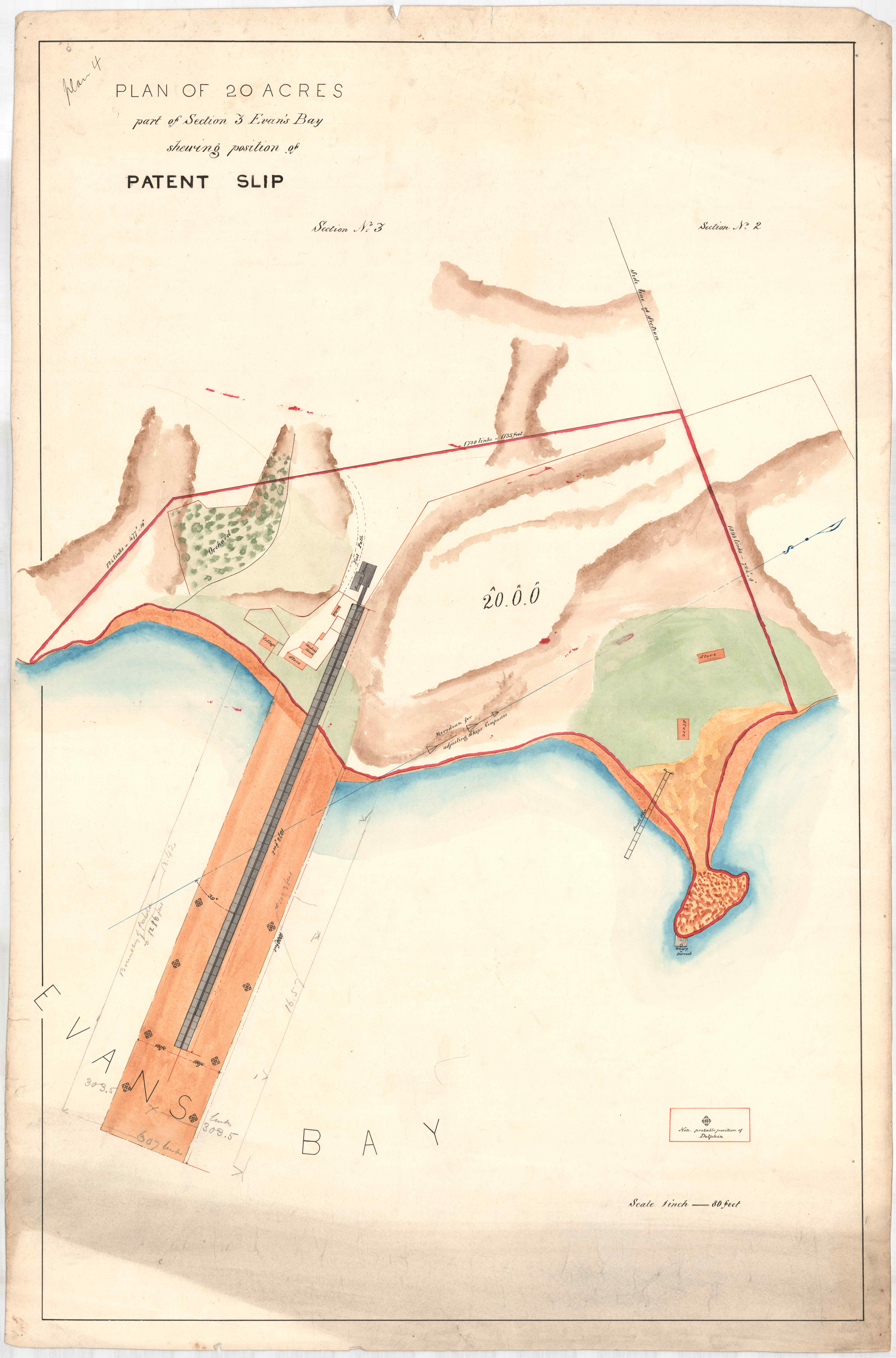
Map showing original slip at Greta Point and new patent slip

The immediate success of the first slipway led the Wellington Provincial Council to investigate building a bigger slip that could handle larger ships. In December 1863, the New Zealand Government passed empowering legislation authorising the Superintendent of Wellington to compulsorily acquire an area of land up to 20 acres (8.1 ha) at Evans Bay for the construction of a larger Patent Slip. The Wellington Provincial Council was keen to have a slip capable of taking large vessels to increase the attractiveness of Wellington Harbour for the shipping trade. However, the Provincial Council was unable to fund the construction, and decided to grant a concession for a slipway to be built and operated. The concession was granted to Kennard Bros., of London.

Kennards manufactured and delivered hundreds of tons of machinery to Wellington in 1866. However, there was a contractual dispute about extra work required due to the nature of the site at Evans Bay, so the equipment sat there on the beach for five years while the dispute was discussed. In 1871 Wellington businessmen formed the Wellington Patent Slip Company and bought the equipment from Kennards. Construction began in 1871 and was completed in May 1873.

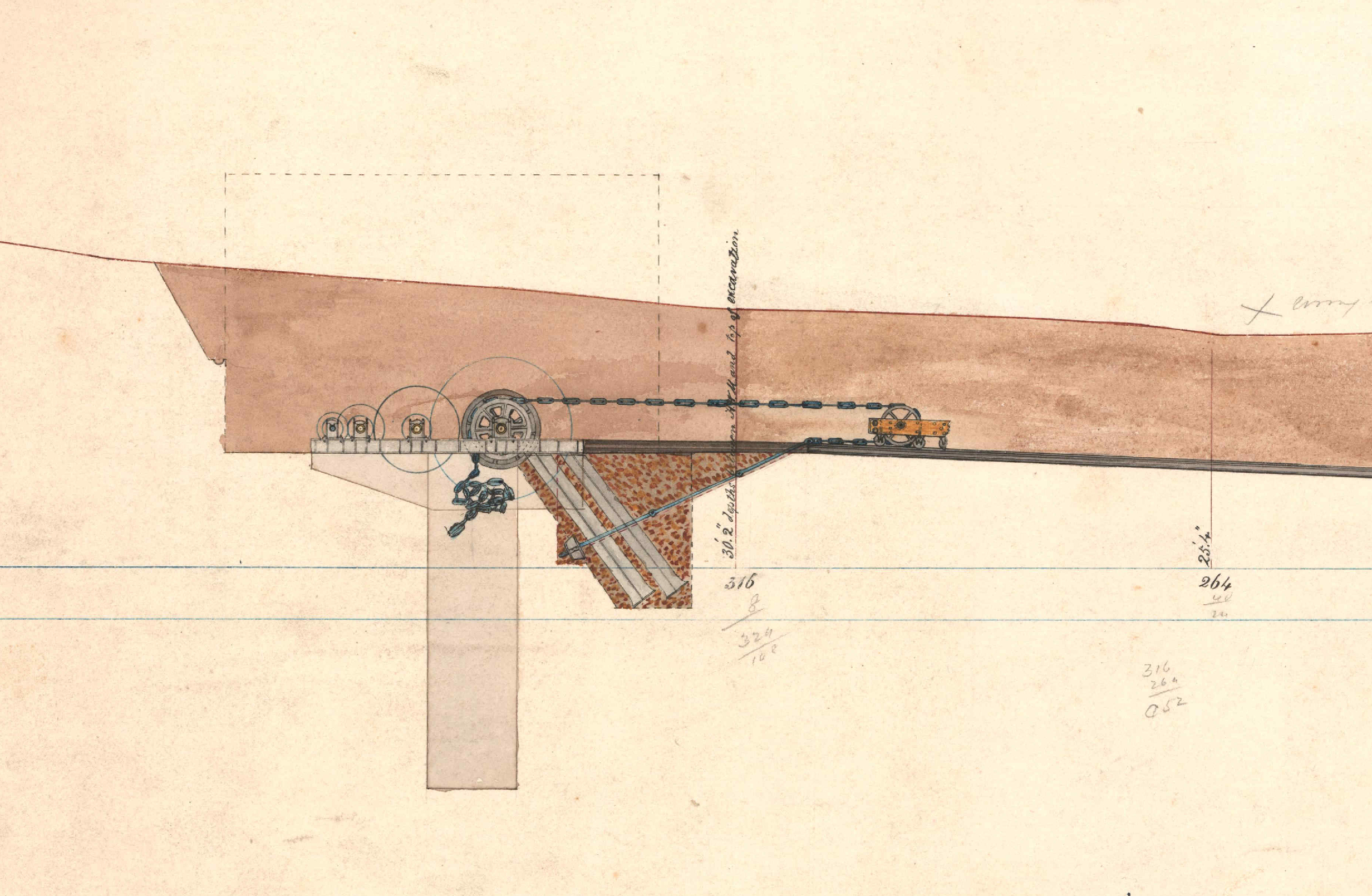
Cross-section of winding gear showing chain attached to cradle and well for chain to drop into

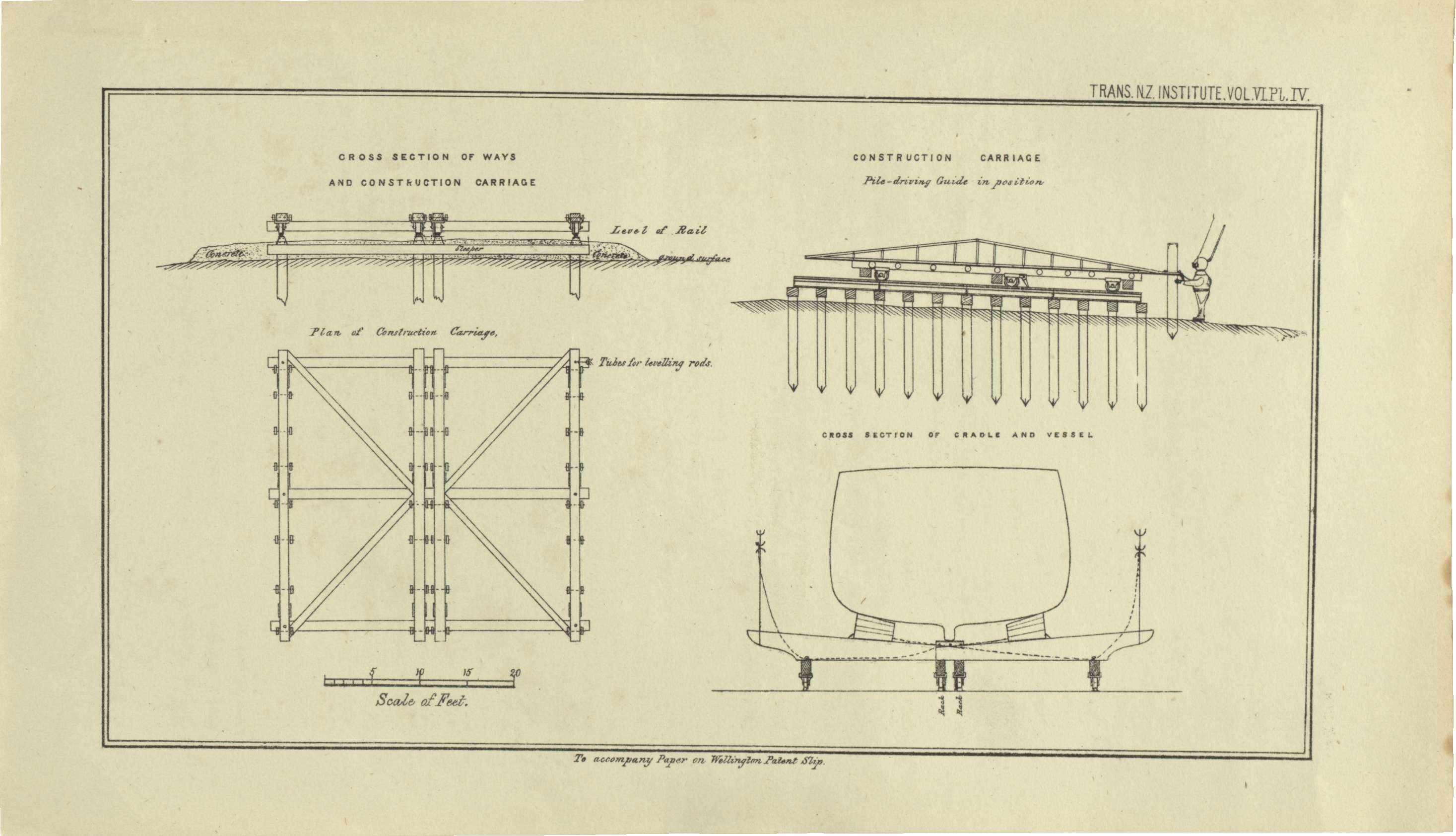
Diagram showing how piles were positioned underwater

The Evans Bay Patent Slip, the first in New Zealand, was a major engineering achievement. A 200-ton, 180-foot-long (55 m) cradle moved on wheels along parallel rails. Two chains were used for hauling vessels out of the water and lowering them back down. The chains ran over a cogwheel winch powered by two steam engines. The main 'hauling up' chain was 1,700 feet (520 m) long and weighed 62 tons. Each link was 18 inches (46 cm) long and made of iron three inches (7.6 cm) thick. One end of the chain was attached to the cradle and the other dropped into a 35-foot-deep (11 m) well beneath the winding gear. The smaller 'lowering out' chain was a loop with links 1 1/4 inches (3.2 cm) thick. This was used for lowering ships down the slip and for bringing up the empty cradle.

Construction on land above the high tide line was straightforward, but work under the water was much more complicated. Workers in a diving bell excavated the sea floor, shifting rock into a shallow iron box which they slid under the edge of the diving bell to be hauled to the surface and removed. The men worked in shifts of four to six hours. After this stage, a diver worked to position piles and join pieces together. Concrete was mixed in a boat on the surface and sent underwater down a tube with a canvas hose at the end so that the diver could direct the concrete to where it was needed. The workers underwater could only work in good weather conditions: in a southerly the current was strong enough to lift a diver off the sea floor. This was the first large-scale underwater construction in New Zealand. A 500-foot (150 m) jetty was also erected to improve communication with ships. Along with housing for the winches and boilers required to operate the slipways, there were some houses, a store, an inspector's office, a carpenter's shop, a messroom, and a blacksmith's shop.

On 2 May 1873, the 316-ton barque Cyprus was the first ship to use the slipway. If necessary, two ships could use the slip at the same time. The first ship would be raised up and then chocks put under it so that the cradle could be released and sent down to pull up a second ship. A small vessel could be raised up the slip in about 20 minutes, and a larger ship could be raised at a rate of 15 or 16 feet per minute (4.6 or 4.9 m/min). The press reported that the slip could handle ships weighing up to 2,000 tons and was "the finest and largest in the Australian colonies". By the late 1890s there were calls for a dry dock in Wellington, amid claims that the Patent Slip could not cope with the increased size and number of ships visiting Wellington.

Early in 1908, the Union Steam Ship Company (Union) acquired 90% of the shares in the Wellington Patent Slip Company. In July 1908, after months of meetings and negotiations with the Patent Slip Company and Union, Wellington Harbour Board acquired the property where the slip was located. Under the agreement, the Patent Slip Company would continue to manage the slip for the next 25 years and build a second slip if required. This was constructed in 1922. Also under the agreement, an area of land not required for slip operations was set aside for use by Union for a 25-year period. After 25 years, the Harbour Board would pay the Patent Slip Company £30,000 and acquire the patent slip operation. The Harbour Board would also pay Union for any improvements it made to the land it was using. The agreement expired in 1933 and after consultation and negotiation it was decided in 1935 that the Harbour Board would continue to lease Patent Slip Company operations and the land used by Union to those two companies on periodic leases. In 1961, Union chose not to renew its lease, so the Harbour Board took over management of both slips until 1969. At that time slipway No. 1 was taken out of service and slipway No. 2 was upgraded. The slipway closed on 31 July 1980. The site was demolished and various equipment scrapped, sold or given to museums, and land was filled in for a new housing subdivision.

The site was listed as a Category 2 historic place in 1982. Wellington City Council had the site rezoned as a heritage area in 2003, and the area is now known as Cog Park.

== Incidents at the slip ==
Over the many years of operation there were several significant incidents at the Patent Slip.

List of incidents at the Patent Slip
Year	Vessel name	Type	Tonnage	Description	Reference
1878				Large flywheel shattered, causing major damage to engine room and machinery	
1909	NZGSS Hinemoa	Steamer	542	Haul-out failure – fracture of 16-foot-diameter (4.9 m) main geared haul wheel	
1914	Karori	Steamer	1863	Fracture of haul chain – leading to uncontrolled re-entry to the water	
1925	Muritai	Harbour ferry		Vessel tailshaft dislodged coming off cradle leading to water ingress. Vessel was beached nearby.	
1926	Kartigi	Steamer	2347	Fracture of haul chain	
1935	Natone	Tug	75	Tug heeled over and sustained damage during haul-out. Floating crane Hikitia used for recovery.	
1947	Tapuhi	Tug	232	Support cradle collapsed beneath tug	

== Gallery ==
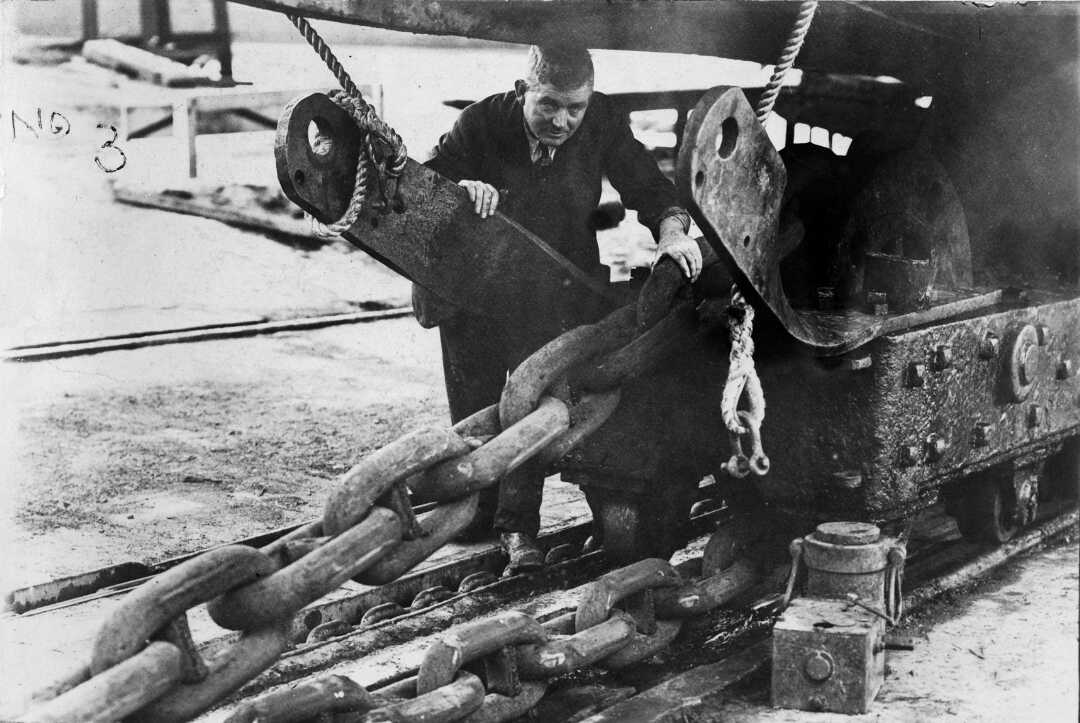
Man working at Patent Slip, c. 1920s

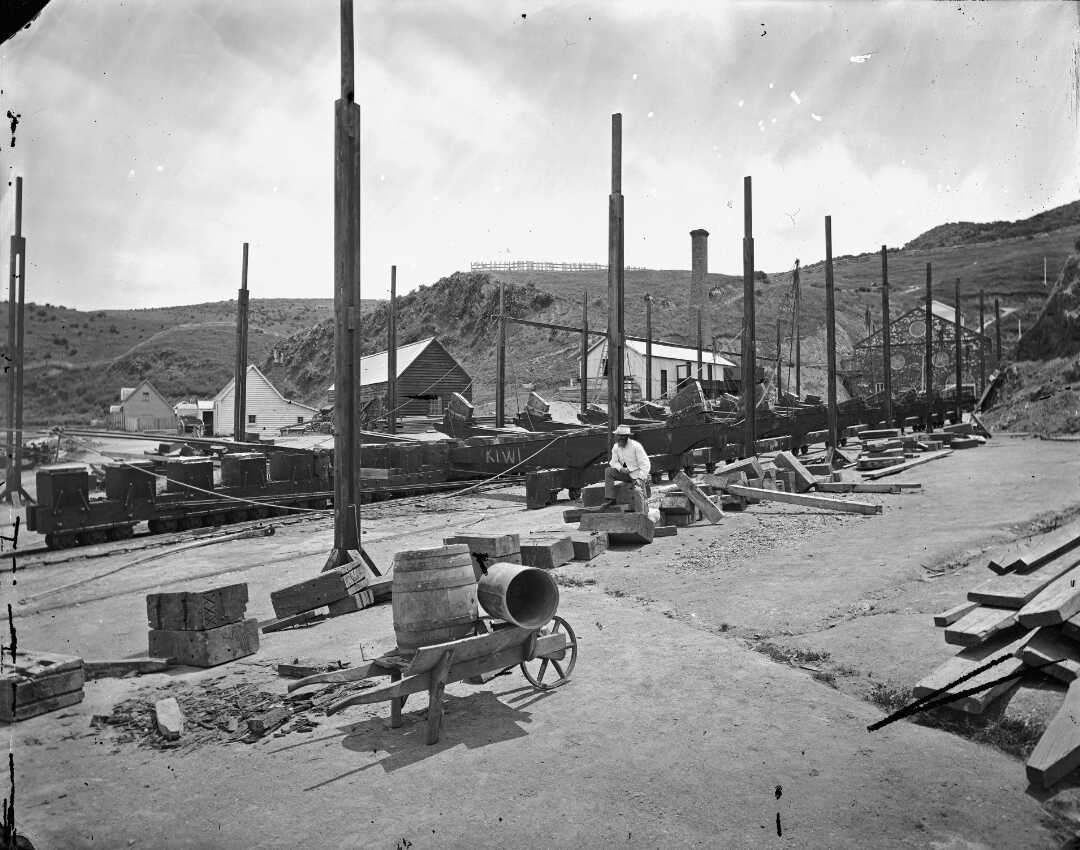
Patent Slip, c. 1880

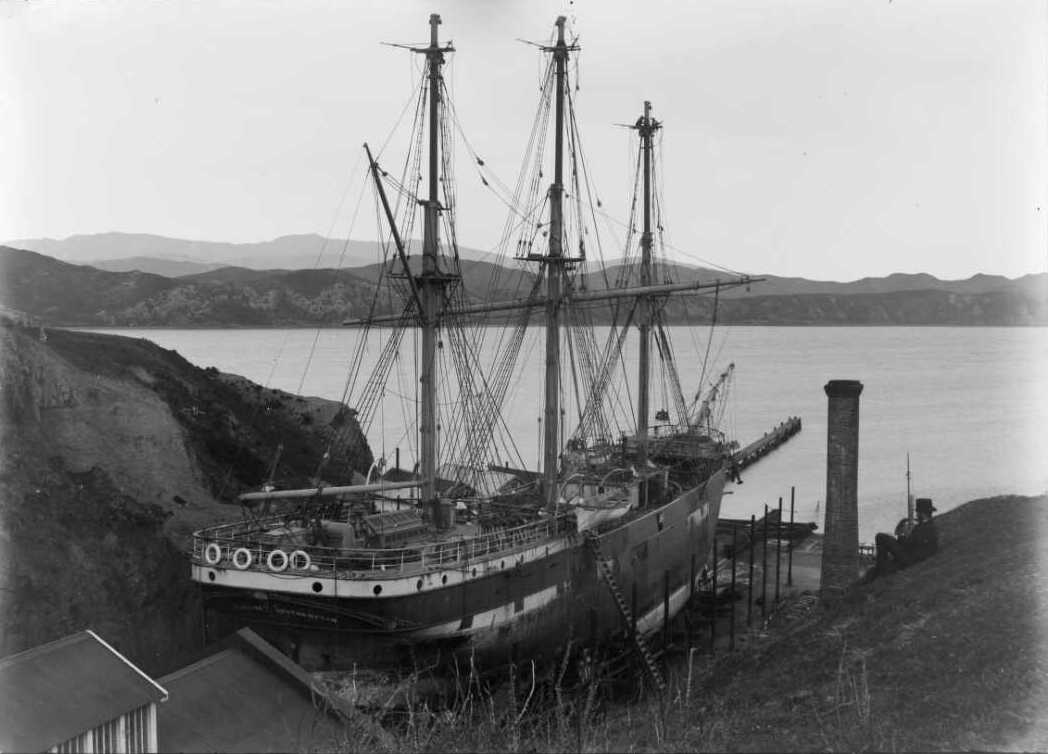
Barque Pleione in the Patent Slip

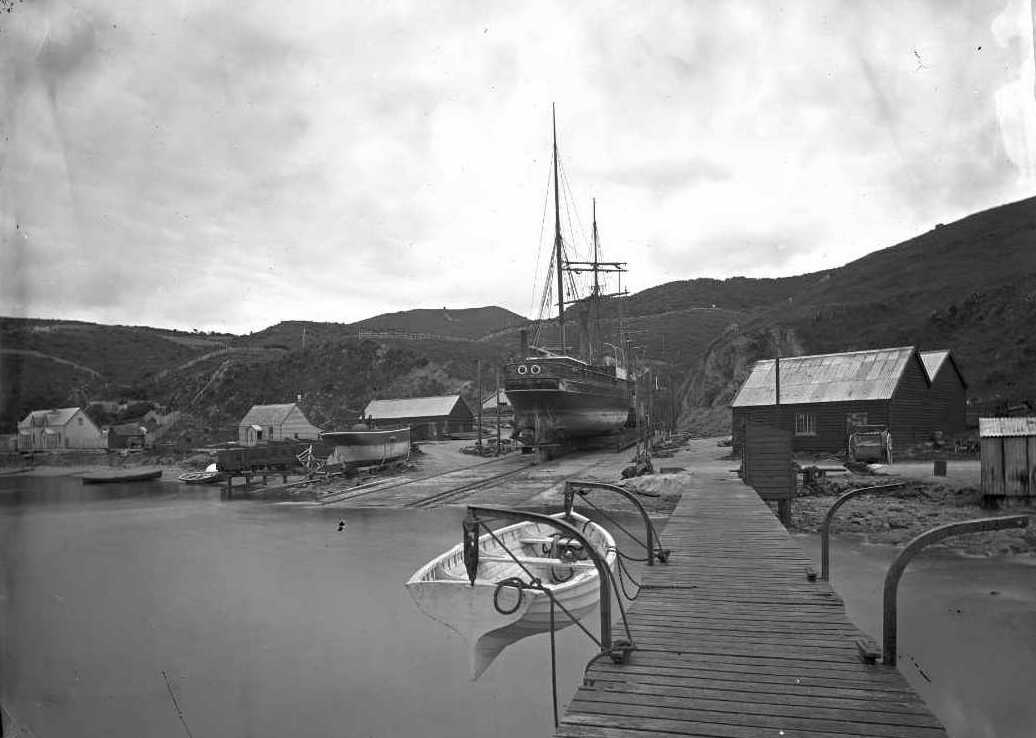
View north at Patent Slip, c. 1880

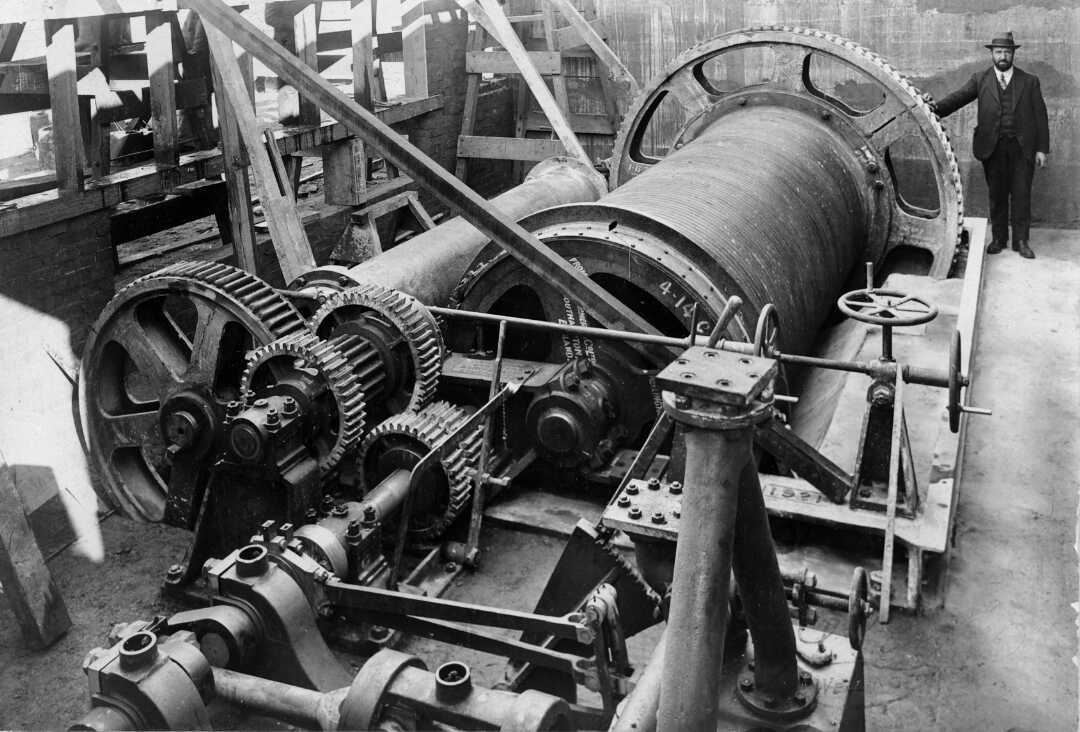
Hauling machinery at the Patent Slip
