= James Marchbanks =

New Zealand land surveyor (1862–1947)

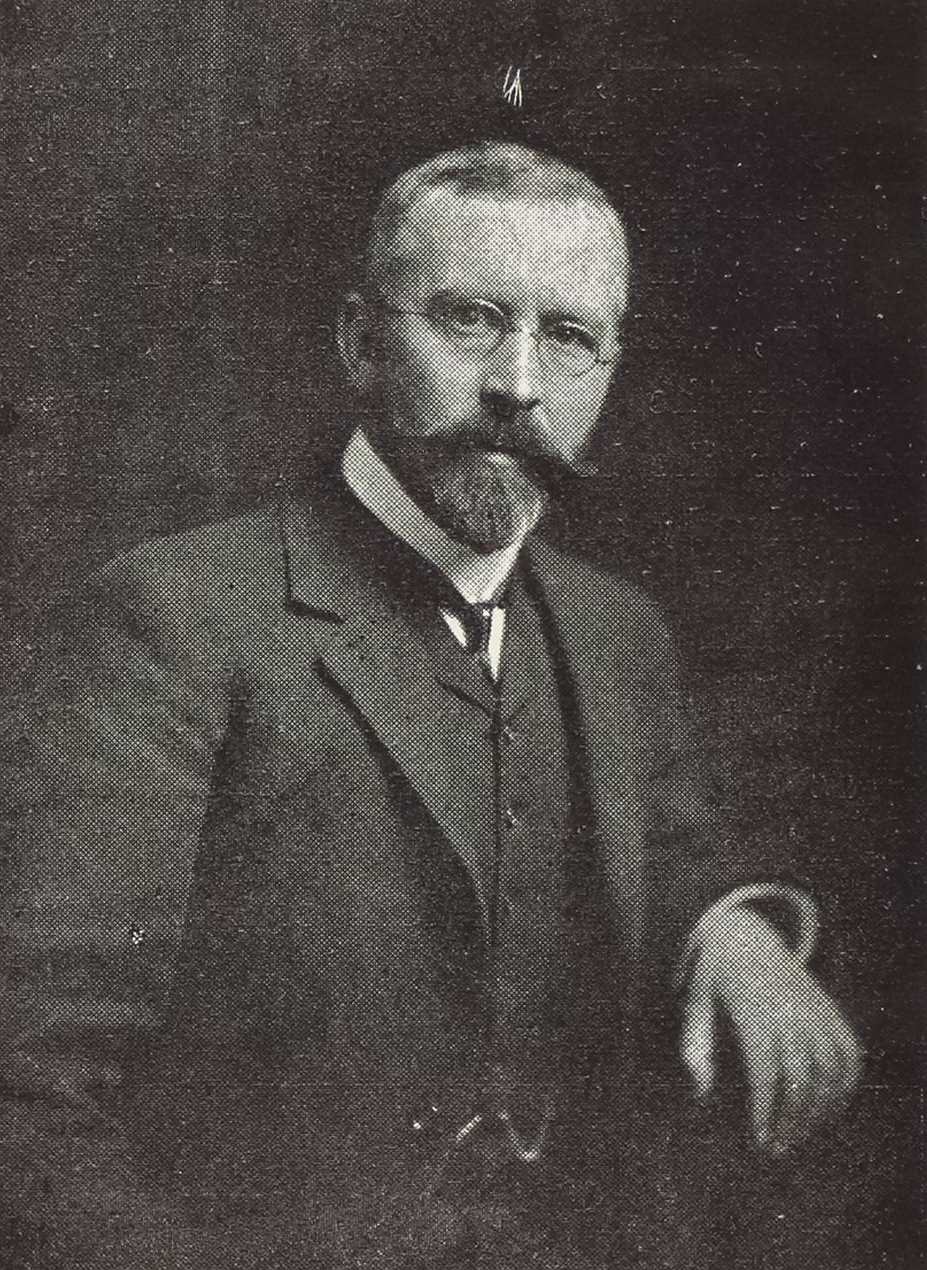
- Born: 27 October 1862; Dunedin, New Zealand
- Died: 6 July 1947 (aged 84); Lower Hutt, New Zealand
- Burial place: St John's Anglican Church cemetery
- Education: University of Otago
- Occupation: Civil engineer
- Organizations: New Zealand Institution of Civil Engineers; New Zealand Institution of Engineers

James Marchbanks (27 October 1862 – 6 July 1947) was a New Zealand civil engineer. He was Engineer and General Manager for the Wellington and Manawatu Railway Company (WMR) and then the Wellington Harbour Board (WHB).

He was born in Dunedin, educated at the University of Otago, and joined the Public Works Department in 1878 as surveyor and civil engineer. He moved to the WMR as Resident Engineer, then Chief Engineer and Locomotive Superintendent. The WMR was taken over in 1908 and became part of the New Zealand Government Railways.

In 1909 he was appointed Engineer to the Wellington Harbour Board, retiring as Chief Engineer and General Manager in 1932. His son Donald Marchbanks (1901–1987) succeeded him as WHB Chief Engineer.

He was a foundation member of the New Zealand Institution of Civil Engineers and was Honorary Treasurer of the New Zealand Institution of Engineers for many years.

He died in 1947 in the Hutt Hospital, and is buried in St John's Anglican Church cemetery, Trentham.
