= Wellington Harbour Board =

Board elected to levy dues on goods passing through Wellington Harbour

Coordinates: 41.285161°S 174.778039°E

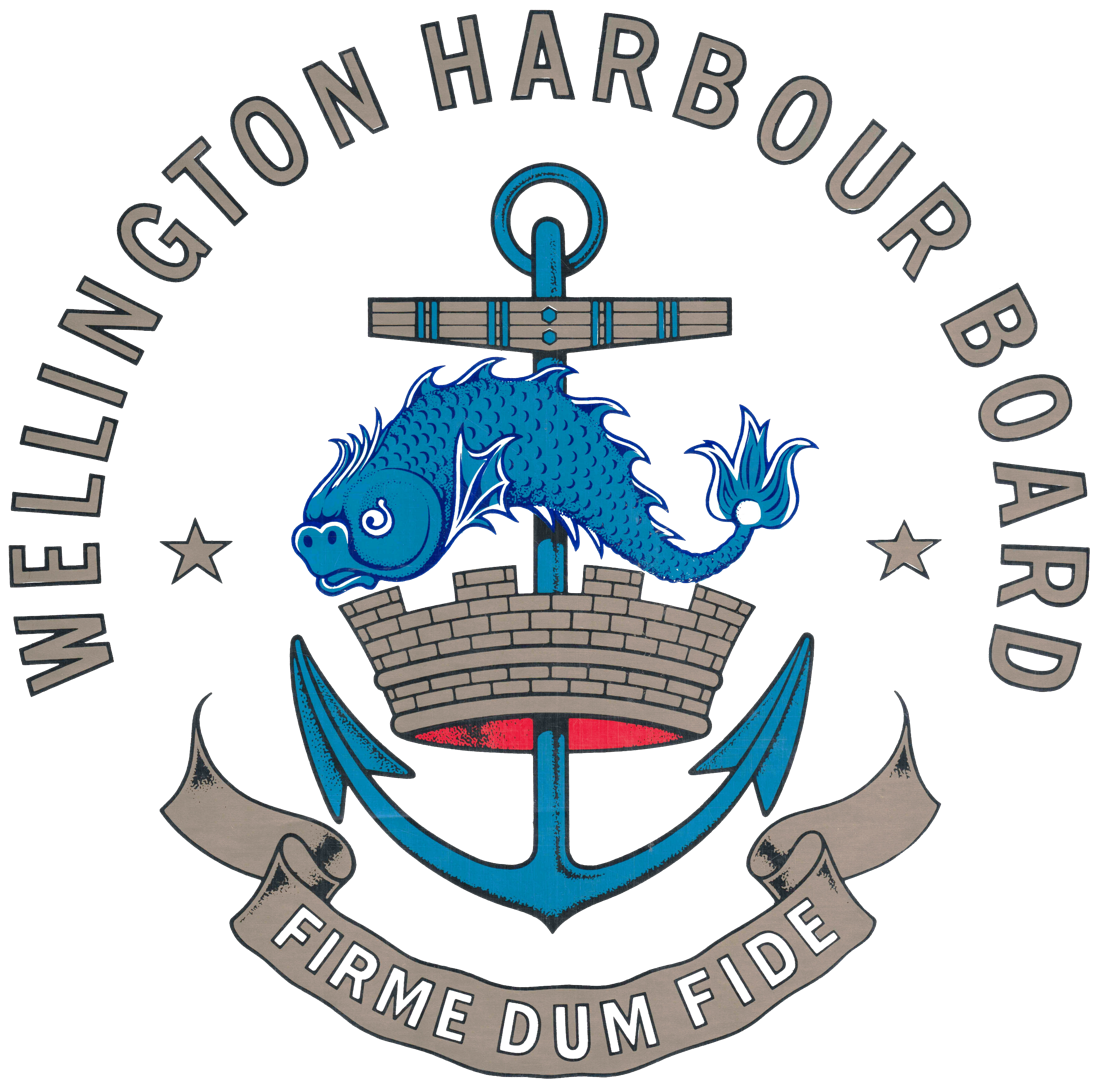
- Crest of the Wellington Harbour Board
- Abbreviation: WHB
- Successor: CentrePort Wellington
- Formation: 1 January 1880; 146 years ago
- Dissolved: 1 November 1989; 37 years ago
- Purpose: Port operator
- Headquarters: Wellington, New Zealand

Wellington Harbour Board was the body which formerly managed the shipping and commercial affairs of the port of Wellington in New Zealand. It was constituted in 1880 and was disestablished in 1989.

During its 110-year tenure the Harbour Board reclaimed land around Wellington Harbour and built and maintained facilities including quays, wharves, goods sheds, a marina, and a floating dock for ship repairs. The Board managed goods and passengers passing through the port from domestic and international locations and was responsible for the safe movement of vessels within the harbour.

== Background ==
Wellington city was settled by British colonists in 1840 and quickly became an important port and business centre. Small private wharves built in the 1840s became inadequate as trade grew and visiting ships became larger. From 1856 the Chamber of Commerce began agitating for a large publicly owned wharf. Wellington Provincial Council gave permission, and Queens Wharf was built in 1862. It was managed by a wharf committee of the Provincial Council. In 1870, Wellington City Corporation (now Wellington City Council) came into being, and in 1871 the Provincial Council sold its interest in Queens Wharf to the City Council, along with the bond store at the wharf and some newly reclaimed land. The City Council leased wharf operations to a private company until 1876, when it took over direct responsibility for the wharf.

Continuing expansion of the city and shipping trade led the Chamber of Commerce to push for a separate entity to manage the business of the port. The government passed the Harbours Act in November 1878 to regulate management of harbours around New Zealand, which led to the establishment of Wellington Harbour Board under the Wellington Harbour Board Act 1879.The act came into effect on 1 January 1880, and the board held its first meeting in February 1880. The Board was an autonomous authority, with responsibility for planning and constructing harbour facilities, regulating the use of wharves, determining port charges and controlling navigation within the harbour limits.

== Establishment ==
The Harbour Board initially consisted of 10 members: three appointed by the Government, the mayor, one person elected by the Chamber of Commerce, two members elected by Wellington ratepayers, one representing shipping interests, one elected by Hutt County Council, and one to represent the Wairarapa County Councils. The members of the first Harbour Board were William Hort Levin, Edward Pearce and William Robert Williams (government appointees); William Hutchison (Mayor of Wellington), Joseph Edward Nathan (representing the Chamber of Commerce), William Valentine Jackson and Paul Coffey (elected by ratepayers), Henry Rose (of the New Zealand Shipping Company, representing shipping interests), Stephen Lancaster (representing Hutt County Council), and Frederick Augustus Krull (a Wellington businessman representing Wairarapa, and the Consul for the German Empire).

Wellington Harbour Board was unique amongst New Zealand harbour boards because as well as control and regulation of the port, supplying water to ships, and providing cool storage, it acted as wharfinger, responsible for taking goods from ships and delivering them to other ships or to destinations in the city. This was said to be cheaper and more efficient than having other businesses do the work, and gave the board strong authority.

Although the Harbour Board was set up with powers to manage shipping, wharf charges and trade in the harbour, it initially had no assets. The board was entitled to take a loan from central government. In October 1881 the Harbour Board paid the City Council £64000 for Queens Wharf and the bond store, and the wharf became its centre of operations. Harbour Board employees in October 1881 consisted of the harbourmaster, outward pilot, four boatmen, pilot, coxswain, and two signalmen. The board members did not receive a salary.

Another deep-water wharf was completed in April 1880: Railway Wharf had been built by the government on newly reclaimed land near Wellington Railway Station. Three railway tracks were laid down on the wharf so that goods could be transported directly from the railway station. The wharf was angled on a north-north-west /south-south-east axis, the same as Queens Wharf, because at the time it was important to moor vessels "fore-and-aft" to Wellington's prevailing winds. Following passage of the Wellington Harbour Board and Corporation Land Act in September 1880, control of Railway Wharf was transferred to the Harbour Board.

== Facilities ==
=== Wharves ===
More wharves were built around the inner harbour. The first wharf built by the Harbour Board was Wool Wharf (now Waterloo Quay Wharf), completed in 1883 to handle the wool trade. This was followed by Ferry Wharf (1897), Glasgow Wharf (1901), Taranaki Street Wharf (1906), Kings Wharf (1909), Clyde Quay Wharf (1910), Tug Wharf (1914) and Pipitea Wharf (1923). In addition to the big wharves built in the inner harbour for movement of goods and passengers, the Harbour Board oversaw construction of suburban wharves in the eastern bays from Petone around to Eastbourne as well as at Evans Bay and Seatoun and Karaka Bay at the harbour entrance.

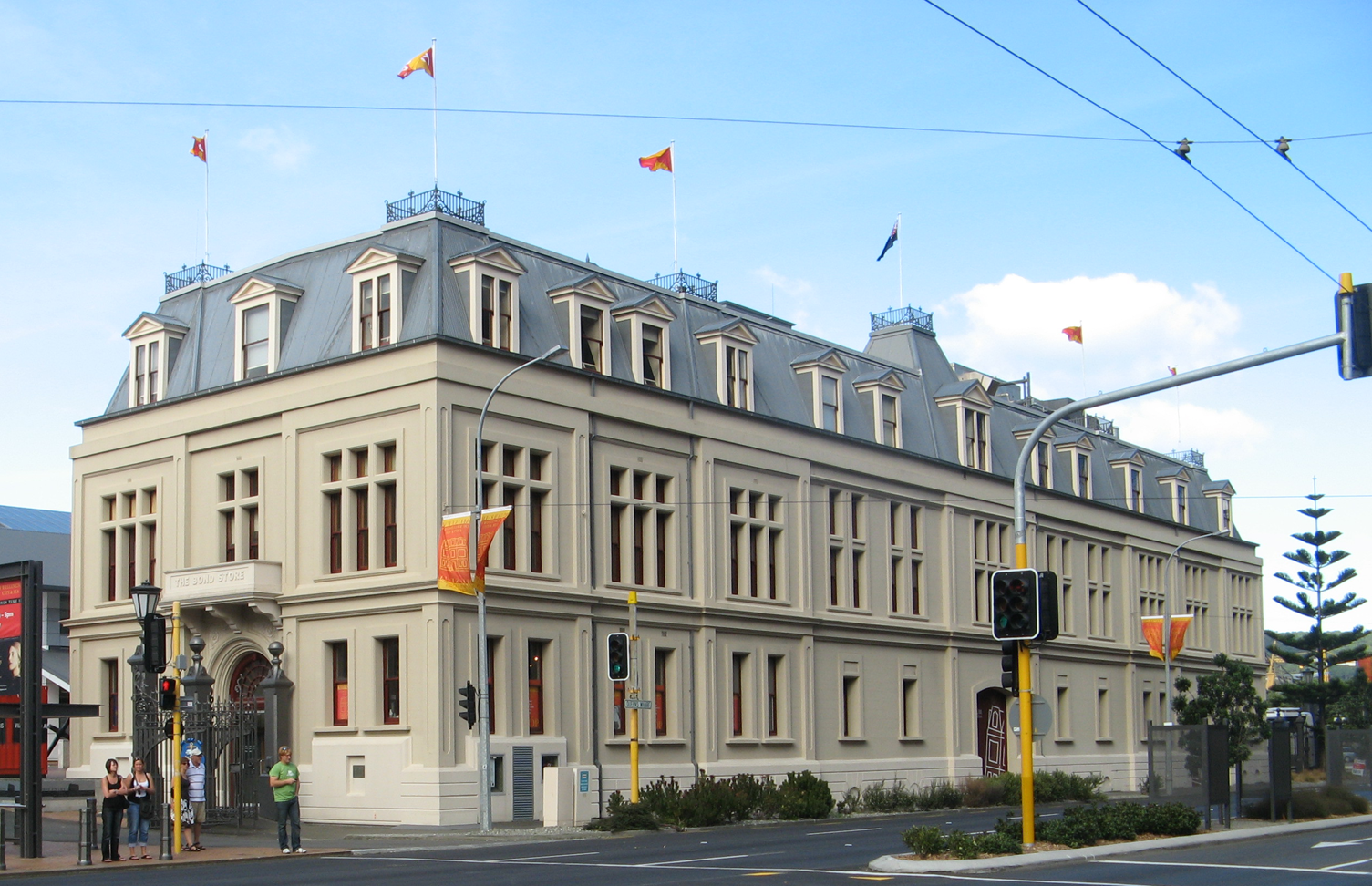
Head Office and Bond Store on Queens Wharf

=== Head Office and Bond Store ===
With the business of the port expanding, the Harbour Board commissioned a new administration building and bond store to replace earlier wooden buildings. The building was built on Jervois Quay at the entrance to Queens Wharf, and was completed in 1892. As of 2025 it houses the Museum of Wellington. The Harbour Board's board room is still on site and open to the public.

=== Wharf Office Building ===
In 1896 the Wharf Office Building was built opposite the Head Office and Bond Store at the entrance to Queens Wharf. Art Nouveau gates made of iron were installed in 1899 between these two buildings at the wharf entrance. As of 2025 the Wharf Office Building houses apartments and the New Zealand Academy of Fine Arts.

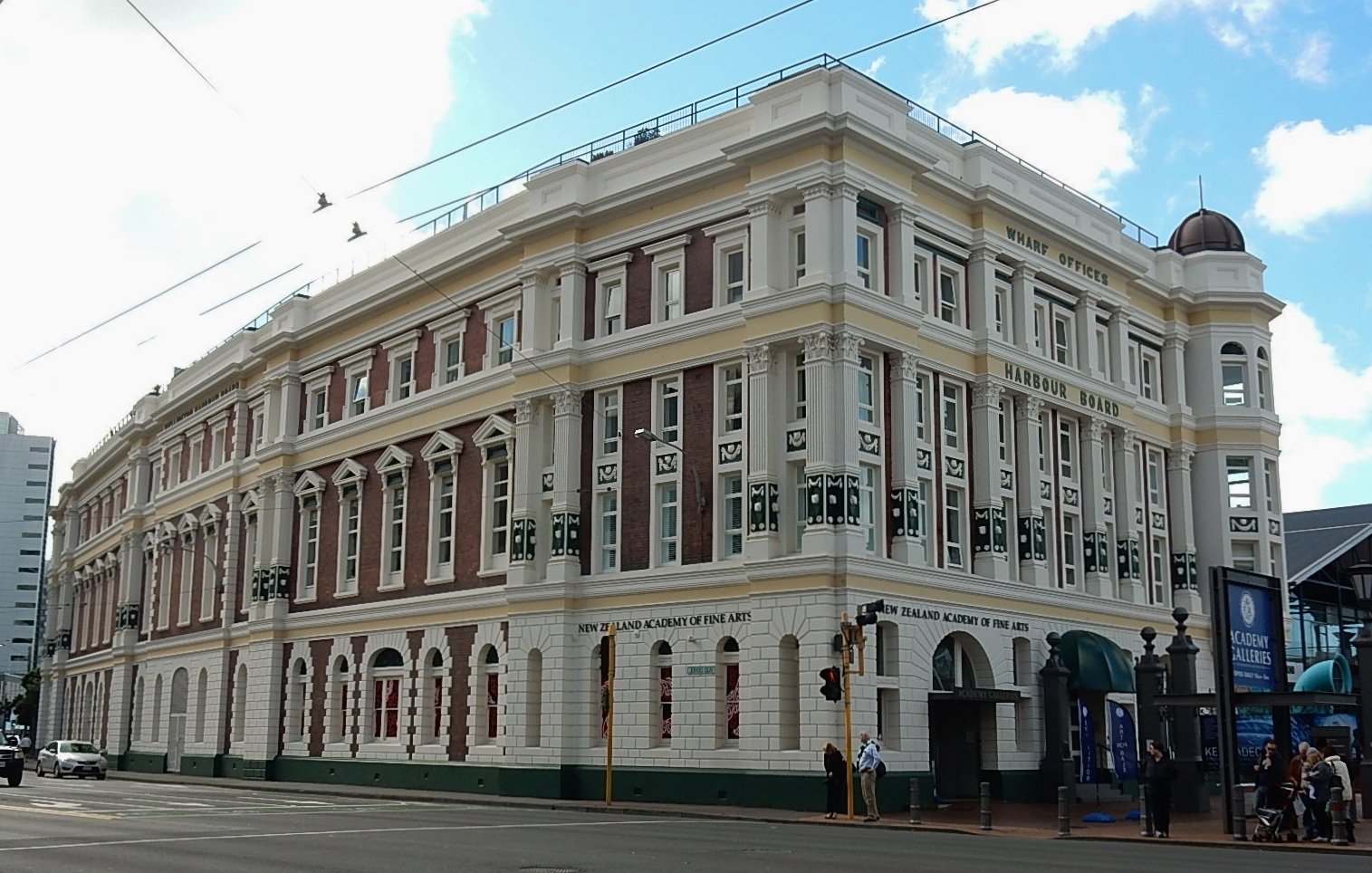
The former wharf offices viewed from Post Office Square

=== Evans Bay Patent Slip ===
A patent slip for hauling up ships for repair was built at Evans Bay in 1873. It was operated by the Wellington Patent Slip Company and didn't come under Wellington Harbour Board control until 1908. The Patent Slip Company, which was 90% owned by the Union Steam Ship Company from 1908, continued to operate the slip (and a second slip built in 1922) under lease from the Harbour Board until 1969, when the Harbour Board took over direct management of both slips. The first slip was taken out of commission and the second one was upgraded. It closed in 1980. One of the triggers of the 1913 Great Strike was a demand by Wellington shipwrights that they be paid travelling time when they had to go to Evans Bay to work at the patent slip.

=== Clyde Quay boat harbour ===
In 1898 local yachtsmen complained that reclamation at Te Aro and other work around Railway Wharf was displacing moorings for small boats. The Harbour Board suggested that yachts could be moored at Evans Bay but the yachting community objected, saying it was too far away and isolated, boats would be vandalised, and the winds there were not ideal. in 1900 the Harbour Board approved construction of a boat harbour and baths at Clyde Quay. Old structures on the beach were removed, Clyde Quay and Oriental Terrace (now Oriental Parade) were widened and a sea wall built, and public salt water baths and a boat harbour for pleasure craft were created. Some land was reclaimed so that the board could build a row of 24 reinforced concrete boatsheds in two sections, with stairs leading down from the footpath. The boatsheds were designed with their roofs below the height of the sea wall so that views of the harbour would not be obstructed. The boatsheds were completed in 1907 and, along with another group of sheds built in 1922, are still in use.

=== Dredges, tugs and launches ===
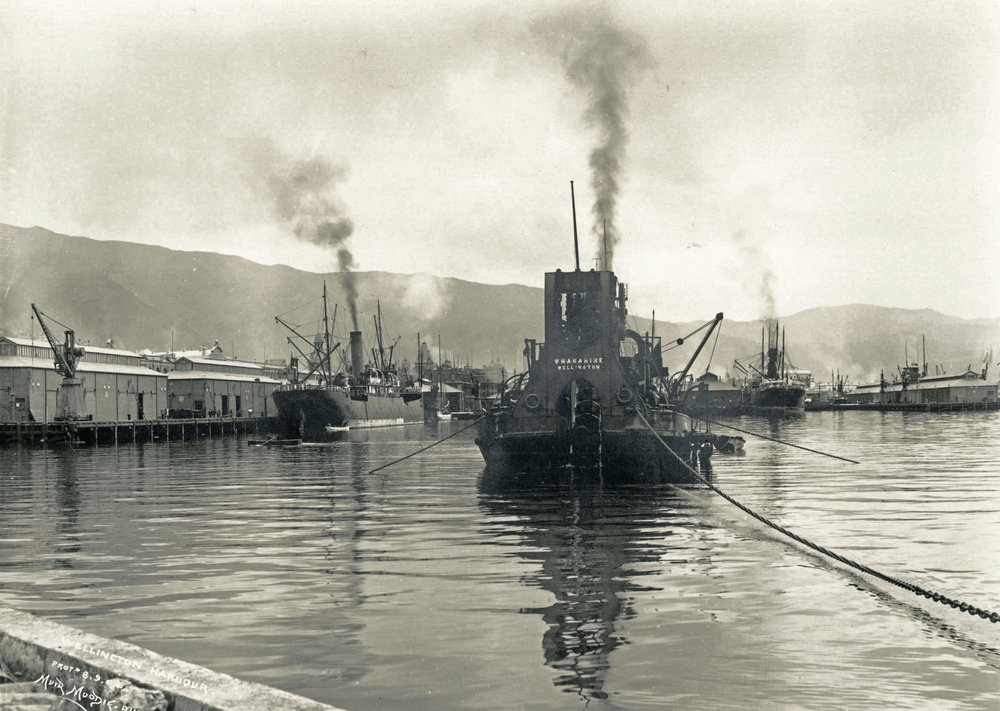
The dredge Whakarire in the harbour, 1904. Queens Wharf is to the left.

In 1882 the board bought a Priestman dredge so that it could remove silt and increase the depth of some berths. In 1902, that dredge was replaced with a new steam dredge. The dredge, named Whakarire ('to deepen water'), was built by Lobnitz and Co. in Renfrew, Scotland and sailed to New Zealand via the Suez Canal and Torres Strait. Whakarire was sold to Napier Harbour Board in 1934 and replaced by Kerimoana ('to dig the sea') in 1938. Kerimoana was scrapped in 1981.

Various privately owned vessels acted as tugs and pilots on the harbour during the 19th and 20th centuries. For example, Wellington Harbour Ferries operated a tug called Duco between 1892 and 1909, and the Union Steam Ship Company bought a tug named Natone in 1904. In 1900 Wellington Harbour Board bought a launch it named Uta, to use as a pilot boat. Uta served the Harbour Board until 1950, and was replaced by Tiakina in 1953.

In 1925 Wellington Harbour Board acquired a purpose-built deep water salvage tug, which it named Toia ('to pull'), on loan from the British Admiralty. The Board also commissioned construction of a floating crane, HIkitia ('to lift') and a new harbourmaster's launch, Arahina ('to lead'). In 1949 Toia was returned to the New Zealand Navy, to be based at Devonport Naval Base and not replaced because the Union Steam Ship Company had two tugs for use in Wellington harbour. Arahina rescued many people from the passenger ferry Wahine when it ran aground at the entrance to Wellington Harbour in 1968. Arahina was sold in 1990, but as of 2023 was still afloat and moored at Queens Wharf.

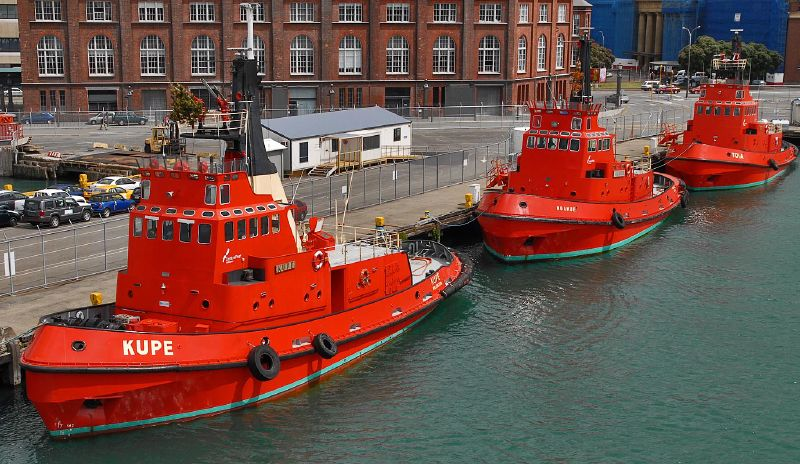
Kupe, Ngahue and Toia. 2007

The Harbour Board bought another pilot launch, the Tiakina, in 1953. Tiakina arrived in Wellington in 1954 and was in service until 1992. As of 2023 it was in use as a private charter boat in Dunedin.

When the Wahine ran aground in 1968, killing 51 people, the Union Steam Ship Company's tug Tapuhi was not strong enough to assist the ship. Responding to the disaster, the Harbour Board bought new, bigger tugs: Kupe, which went into service in 1971, Toia (1972) and Ngahue (1977). The Harbour Board's successor, CentrePort, sold Kupe in 2009, and Toia and Ngahue in 2014.

=== Hikitia floating crane ===
The Harbour Board bought Hikitia, a self-propelled floating steam crane, in 1925. Hikitia was constructed in Scotland and sailed to Wellington under its own power. As of 2025 it is still in working order and thought to be the only working steam crane of its kind in the world.

=== Jubilee floating dock ===
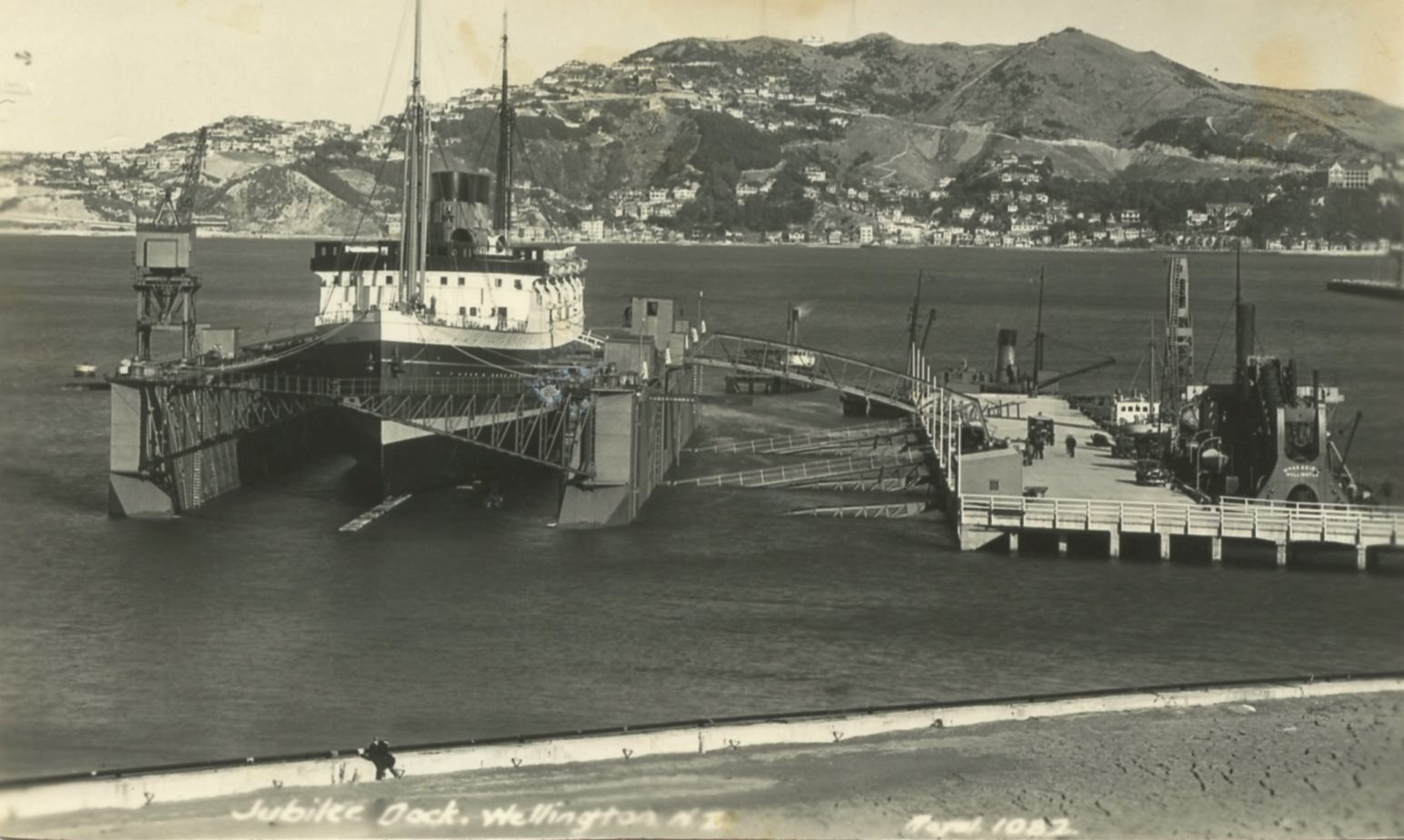
Jubilee Floating Dock c. 1935

In 1928, the Harbour Board announced a decision to procure and install a floating dock with a lifting power of 15,000 tons, to be used for ship repairs. The floating dock was built in England by Swan Hunter & Wigham Richardson of Wallsend, with the contract awarded in August 1930 for a dock with a lifting capacity of 17,000 tons, with dimensions 160 m (540 ft) long and 36 m (117 ft) wide. It left the Tyne on 15 July 1931 and was towed for five and a half months at sea over a route through the Suez Canal, covering 21,000 km (13,000 mi), and arrived in Wellington Harbour on 28 December 1931. A wharf was built adjacent to the Thorndon reclamation for permanent mooring of the floating dock. The dock was powered by electricity and included a crane capable of lifting up to five tons. The dock was named 'Jubilee Dock' in honour of the Harbour Board's fiftieth anniversary in 1930.

An initial test of the floating dock was undertaken with the passenger liner SS Ruahine, on 2 April 1932. The first commercial service using the new floating dock was an overhaul of the ferry TSS Maori, from early April.

One of the more notable incidents associated with the floating dock during more than 50 years of service was the repair of the trans-Tasman liner MS Wanganella after it struck Barrett Reef while entering Wellington Harbour in January 1947. Shortly after entering the floating dock, repair work on the vessel was halted because of an industrial dispute.

In 1988, the Harbour Board sold the floating dock to an engineering firm in Nelson, and it was then on-sold for use in Singapore. The dock was taken in tow from Wellington, but broke up and sank on 2 January 1989, only five days into the tow.

== Progress ==
An animation showing the phases of reclamation by year in Wellington Harbour.

=== Reclamation ===
Although the Harbour Board controlled the wharves, Wellington City Council retained control of the Te Aro seabed and foreshore. From 1884 to 1889 the Council conducted a programme of reclamation which brought it into conflict with the Harbour Board. Further reclamation would continue throughout the life of the board. Major reclamation at Thorndon was proposed in 1916 but work did not begin until 1923.

=== 1930: New Zealand's main port ===
1930 marked the 50th year of operation of the Wellington Harbour Board. In 1930, Wellington was the main trans-shipping port in New Zealand, with over 3000 trading vessels visiting in the previous year. The port handled 62% of New Zealand's hemp exports, 50% of cheese exports and 28% of the country's wool exports. Other products exported from Wellington included butter, frozen meat and apples – in total, an average of 26% of New Zealand's exports.

By this time there were 14 members on the board, and almost 400 permanent staff. In addition, the board employed an average of around 350 casual wharf labourers each day. Harbour Board facilities included 10 inner-harbour wharves, oil wharves at Evans Bay and Point Howard, suburban wharves, Clyde Quay marina for pleasure craft, 35 goods stores along the wharves and waterfront, a variety of cranes including its large new floating crane Hikitia, weighbridges, a repair shop, and a tug. A floating dock was being built, and reclamation of land at Thorndon was continuing.

=== 1940–1960s ===
The Harbour Board continued to upgrade and expand its wharves and facilities. A new breastwork and reclamation in Thorndon begun in the 1920s was completed in late 1939.

During World War 2, Wellington was an important port for troop movements. United States authorities were given sole use of the newly developed Aotea Quay. In October 1943, the 2nd Division of the United States Marine Corps embarked at Aotea Quay on their way to the Battle of Tarawa. The marina and boatsheds at Clyde Quay were also made available to the United States as a base for repairs and maintenance of their small craft and landing barges. Almost 72% of 120,000 troops in the 2nd New Zealand Expeditionary Force embarked from Wellington.

In 1946 Wellington was still New Zealand's busiest trans-shipping port, with 70% of New Zealand's tonnage moving through the port. By weight, Wellington accounted for 43% of New Zealand's cheese exports, 24% of frozen meat, 19% of wool bales and 14% of butter exports.

In February 1951, major industrial action now known as the Waterfront Dispute took place. Waterfront workers around New Zealand refused to work overtime on the wharves, demanding more pay, better working conditions and a repeal of restrictions enforced by the Government during World War 2. Shipping companies refused to employ workers unless they agreed to work overtime. Workers were then locked out of the wharves, which at that time were fenced and able to have access restricted. On 15 February 1951 there were 21 foreign ships berthed in Wellington and a queue of freighters waiting to berth, and by the end of March, 38 ships were in the harbour waiting to discharge 70,000 tons of cargo. As Harbour Board employees refused to work, the government called in hundreds of army and navy servicemen to unload ships. At the end of March, Harbour Board employees voted to return to work, but other workers on the wharves remained on strike. The dispute lasted 151 days and led to changes in the unionisation and employment conditions of waterfront workers.

Between 1950 and 1960 the board built bulk-handling facilities for coal and wheat at Aotea Quay and began development for a roll on/roll off-road and rail ferry at Interisland Wharf. The ferry Aramoana came into service in 1962. Development of Wellington Airport, which opened in 1959, required land, foreshore and harbour areas controlled by the Harbour Board, so in an arrangement with the Government the board ceded these areas to the airport development and received land near the Hutt River estuary in exchange. The board reclaimed 47.5 acres (19.2 ha) of land near its Point Howard oil wharf for leasing to oil companies.

By 1960 there were 15 men on the board, representing Manawatu, Wairarapa, Upper Hutt/Lower Hutt/Petone, Hutt County/Eastbourne/Tawa, and Wellington city. The board had 739 permanent staff in four departments: the Traffic Department received and delivered cargo; the Harbour Department controlled the movement of ships in the harbour, mooring and pilotage; the Engineers Department handled repairs to facilities and planned new works; and the Accounts Department handled financial matters and statistics. The board also employed almost 500 casual workers on the wharves. During 1959, there were 2579 shipping arrivals in Wellington from New Zealand and foreign ports. The port handled 68% of New Zealand's trans-shipment tonnage. Primary produce made up much of the goods exported: 30% of New Zealand's cheese exports by weight and 16% of its frozen meat exports left from Wellington. Other commodities exported included wool, hides and skins and apples. Imports coming through Wellington included cars, tractors, iron and steel, cotton and synthetic piece goods, petrol and tobacco.

=== Container handling capability ===
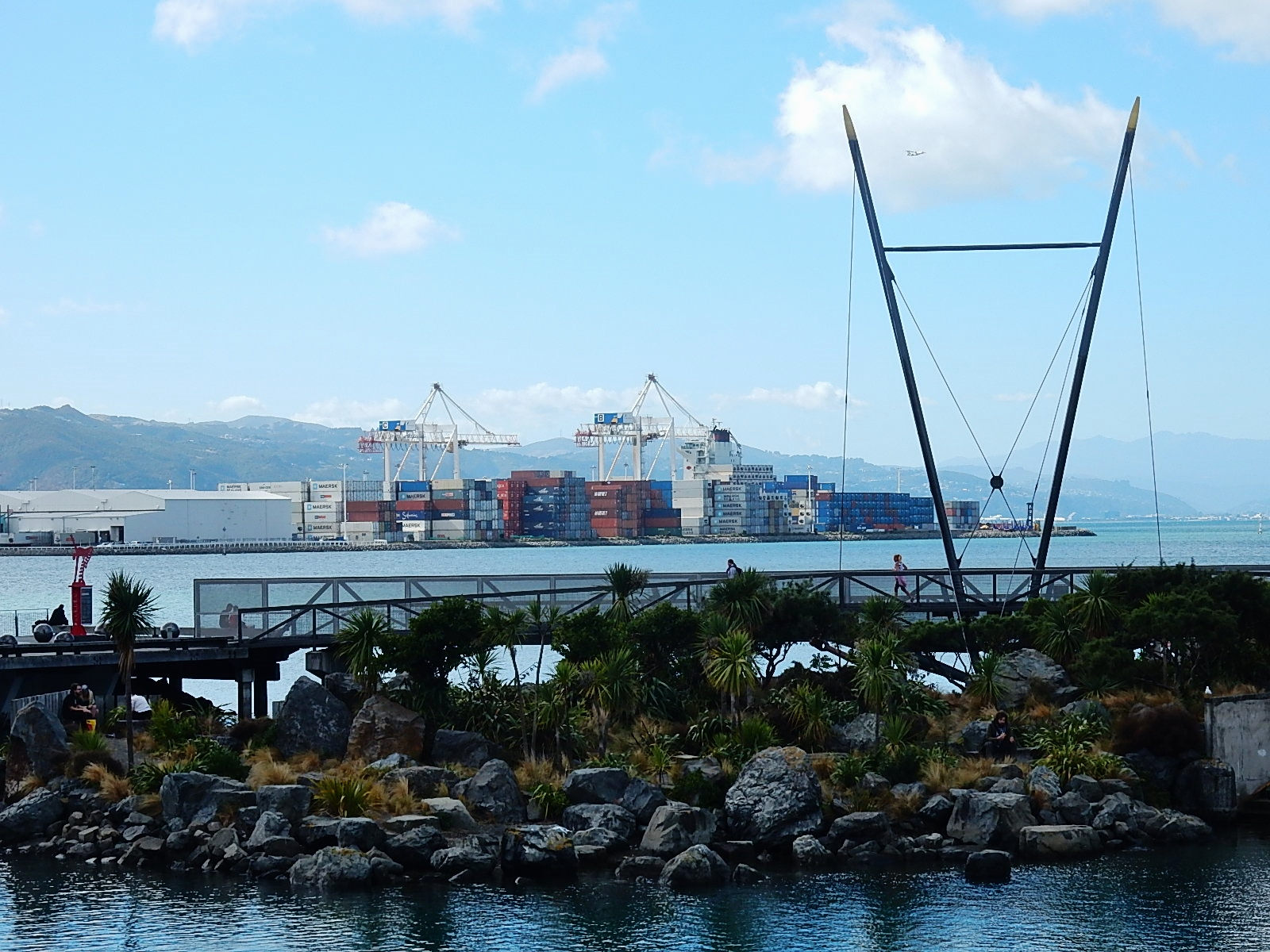
The container terminal, seen from Whairepo Lagoon.

In 1969, the Government approved a recommendation from the New Zealand Ports Authority for the installation of a container crane at the ports of Auckland and Wellington. Construction of the Wellington container handling terminal was underway by 1971, including a 49 ha (120 acres) reclamation at the end of Aotea and Fryatt Quays. Two new tugs, Kupe and Toia, were purchased to handle the larger ships expected, and a 40 tonne container crane was ordered. Erection of the container crane began in early 1971. The first container ship arrived in Wellington in June 1971, but was unloaded with conventional cranes, because an industrial agreement with unions had not yet been reached for the operation of the container crane. A second container crane was ordered for the port and delivered in 1975, but an industrial dispute with the boilermakers union caused delay to the construction.

A separate industrial dispute involving demarcation issues caused a 3-year delay to the commissioning of a crane intended to load containers onto railway wagons at the port. The crane was finally put into service in August 1975.

In November 1976, funding was approved for a third container crane at the port. Industrial disputes involving the Wellington boilermakers and the Federation of Labour caused a delay of almost 12 months in the construction and commissioning of the crane. The delays to the construction of the container crane, along with more protracted delays to the construction of the steel structure of the BNZ building in Willis Street, led building developers to change designs and move away from the use of steel as a main structural element in building construction.

In the 1979 financial year, the Harbour Board reported 85,257 container movements.

== Organisational change ==
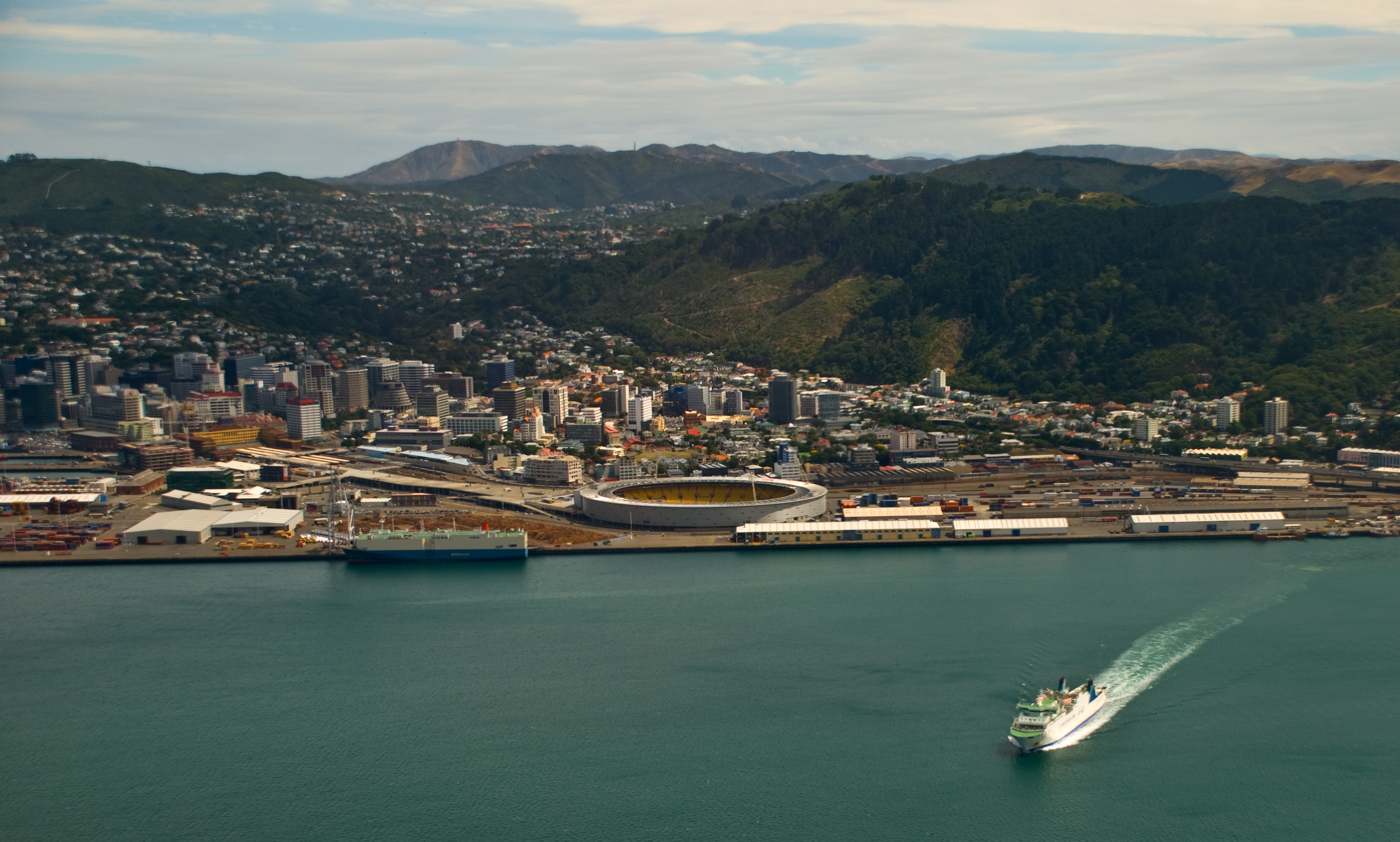
Rail yards and sports stadium on reclaimed land at Thorndon.

With the shift of port facilities to the Thorndon container terminal, other parts of the waterfront could be redeveloped. In 1986 the Lambton Harbour Group – a collection of architects, urban designers and town planners – was formed to develop concept plans for 22 hectares of the waterfront between Wellington Railway Station / Waterloo Quay and the Overseas Passenger Terminal (formerly Clyde Quay Wharf). Lambton Harbour Group was later renamed Lambton Harbour Management. About 80% of the area was owned by the Harbour Board. The Board and Wellington City Council would together choose which concept they preferred for the area. Wellington Harbour Board, Wellington City Council and the Wellington Civic Trust jointly won an award from the New Zealand Planning Institute for the Lambton Harbour Development Project in April 1988. The president of the Institute said that the Lambton Harbour project was "a good example of the enterprise planning which can be promoted to local authorities in New Zealand to ensure more efficient use and enjoyment of public resources by the people of New Zealand”. One of the first projects proposed by the Lambton Harbour Development Project was the Queens Wharf Retail Centre, initially described as a 'Festival Marketplace' or 'Market Hall'. The retail centre opened in 1995 but was an immediate failure and the building was sold in 1998. Other early projects included the redevelopment of Frank Kitts Park, begun in 1989, and the refurbishment of Shed 3 as Dockside restaurant, begun in 1991.

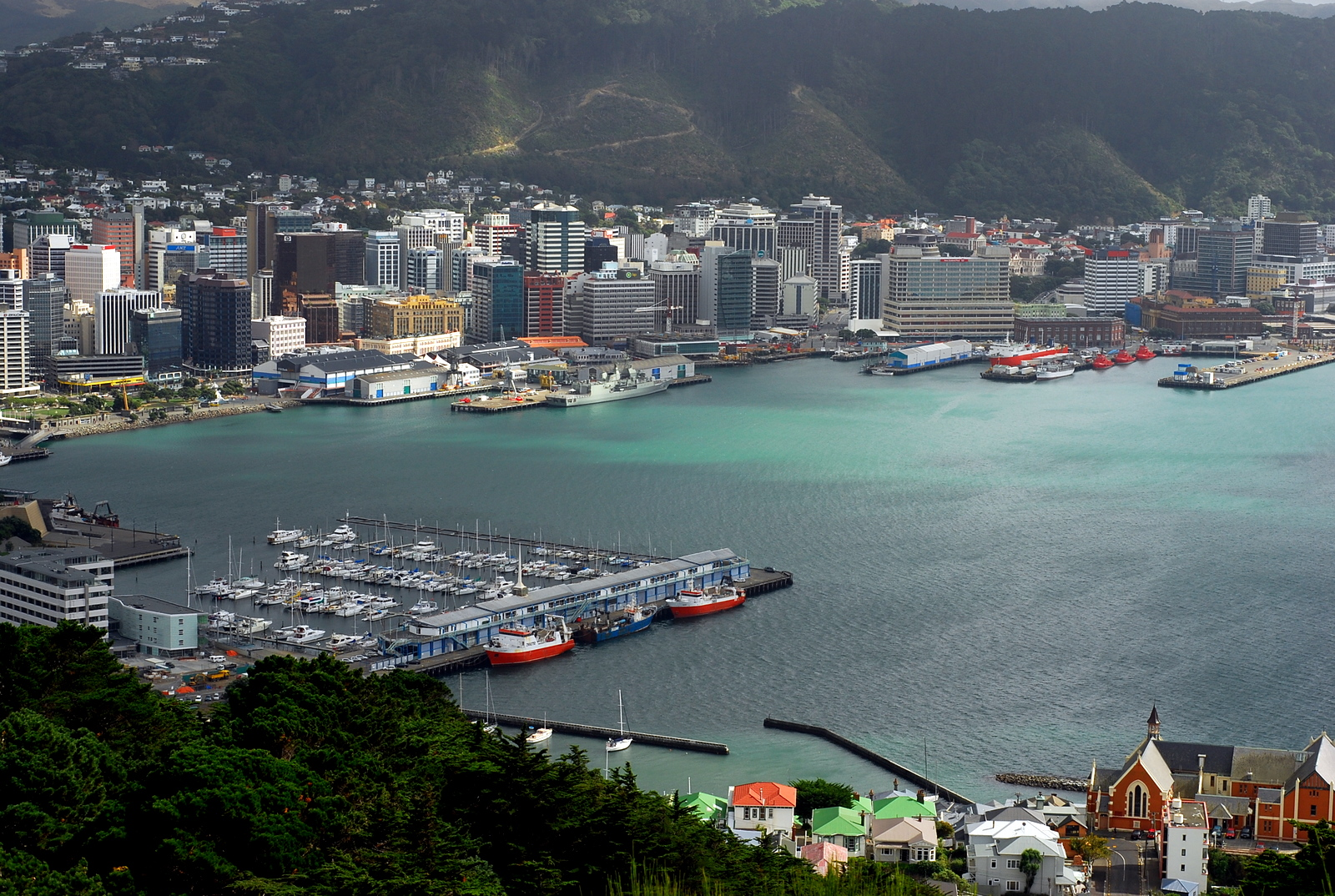
Lambton Harbour, with Chaffers marina in foreground

Wellington Harbour Board was disestablished after the passing of the Port Companies Act 1988 and the Local Government Act 1989, as part of the 1989 local government reforms. Operational port assets were transferred to a new commercial company called Port of Wellington (now known as CentrePort) formed on 1 October 1988. Ownership of the Port of Wellington company was vested in Greater Wellington Regional Council and Horizons Regional Council. When the port company was formed, it owned approximately 72 hectares (180 acres) of Wellington waterfront property including wharves. The remainder of the Wellington waterfront area, from Shed 21 to Clyde Quay Wharf, including all the buildings and the area covered by the Lambton Harbour Development Project, was transferred to Wellington City Council. In 1988, Australia was New Zealand's biggest trading partner but most of the new Port of Wellington's business was with Europe and Japan. Meat and manufactured goods were the main products exported from Wellington, with other products shipped through the port including bulk wheat and cement, machinery, steel, imported cars, meat, dairy and wool.

The Harbour Board's interest in the Lambton Harbour Development Project was transferred to Wellington City Council under the provisions of the Local Government (Wellington Region) Reorganisation Order 1989. From this time, Lambton Harbour Management was wholly owned by Wellington City Council but operated separately. Wellington Harbour Board was officially dissolved on 1 November 1989.

== Chairmen of Wellington Harbour Board ==
The following is a complete list of chairmen of Wellington Harbour Board.

No.	Chairman (Birth–Death)	Portrait	Term of office		Constituency
1	William Levin (1845–1893)		1880	1881	Governor
2	William Valentine Jackson (1832–1900)		1881	1883	Wellington
3	Edward Pearce (1832–1922)		1883	1887	Governor
4	John Duthie (1841–1915)		1887	1888	Wellington
5	Henry Rose (1833–1912)		1888	1891	Shipowners
6	William Booth (1837–1903)		1891	1892	Wairarapa
7	John Honeycombe Cock (1848–1892)		1892	1893	Chamber of Commerce
8	John Jack (1827–1909)		1893	1895	Wellington
9	Thomas John William Gale (1853–1903)		1895	1897	Chamber of Commerce
10	Francis Humphris Fraser (1833–1911)		1897	1899	Governor
11	John Hutcheson (1854–1940)		1899	1900	Government
12	Harold Beauchamp (1858–1938)		1900	1903	Wellington
13	Nicholas Reid (1837–1915)		1903	1904	Shipowners
14	William Cable (1848–1922)		1904	1906	Wellington
15	Kennedy Macdonald (1847–1914)		1906	1908	Governor
16	Thomas Wilford (1870–1939)		1908	1910	Governor
17	Robert Fletcher (1863–1918)		1910	1915	Wellington
18	Charles Edward Daniell (1856–1939)		1915	1919	Wellington
19	Joseph Harkness (1850–1930)		1919	1923	Governor
20	George Mitchell (1877–1939)		1923	1925	Wellington
21	Maurice Cohen (1862–1934)		1925	1927	Manawatu
22	John Cobbe (1859–1944)		1927	1929	Manawatu
23	John William McEwan (1856–1942)		1929	1931	Hutt
24	Charles Norwood (1871–1966)		1931	1933	Wellington
25	Charles Murray Turrell (1868–1944)		1933	1934	Shipowners
26	Thomas Robert Barrer (1863–1951)		1934	1936	Wairarapa
27	Dougall John McGowan (1880–1940)		1936	1939	Payers of Dues
28	Meldrum Alfred Eliott (1867–1946)		1939	1940	Manawatu
29	William Lockhart Fitzherbert (1877–1956)		1940	1941	Manawatu
30	William Henry Price (1872–1963)		1941	1954	Shipowners
31	Sir Will Appleton (1889–1958)		1954	1957	Wellington
32	Brian Edwin Keiller (1901–1977)		1957	1961	Manawatu
33	Ernest Toop (1895–1976)		1961	1966	Wellington
34	Barry Barton-Ginger (1892–1969)		1966	1968	Makara
35	Eric Malcolm Hodder (1897–1987)		1968	1971	Wairarapa
36	Rolland O'Regan (1904–1992)		1971	1974	Wellington
37	Henry Alan James (1924–2001)		1974	1980	Wairarapa
38	John King (1917–2012)		1980	1986	Feilding
39	Nigel Gould (born 1948)		1986	1989	Lower Hutt

== See also ==
- James Marchbanks (general manager, chief engineer)
- Wellington Harbour Board Head Office and Bond Store
- Wellington Harbour Board Wharf Office Building
