= 1938 in architecture =

The year 1938 in architecture involved some significant events.

== Events ==
- First woman elected to Royal Institute of British Architects, Josephine Miller.

== Buildings and structures ==
=== Buildings opened ===
- July – Saltdean Lido and Ocean Hotel, Saltdean, East Sussex, England, both designed by R.W.H. Jones.
- October 22 – Oxford Playhouse, Oxford, England, designed by Edward Maufe.
- October 29 – City Hall, Norwich, England, designed by C. H. James and S. R. Pierce.
- November 14 – Lions Gate Bridge in Vancouver, British Columbia, Canada.

=== Buildings completed ===
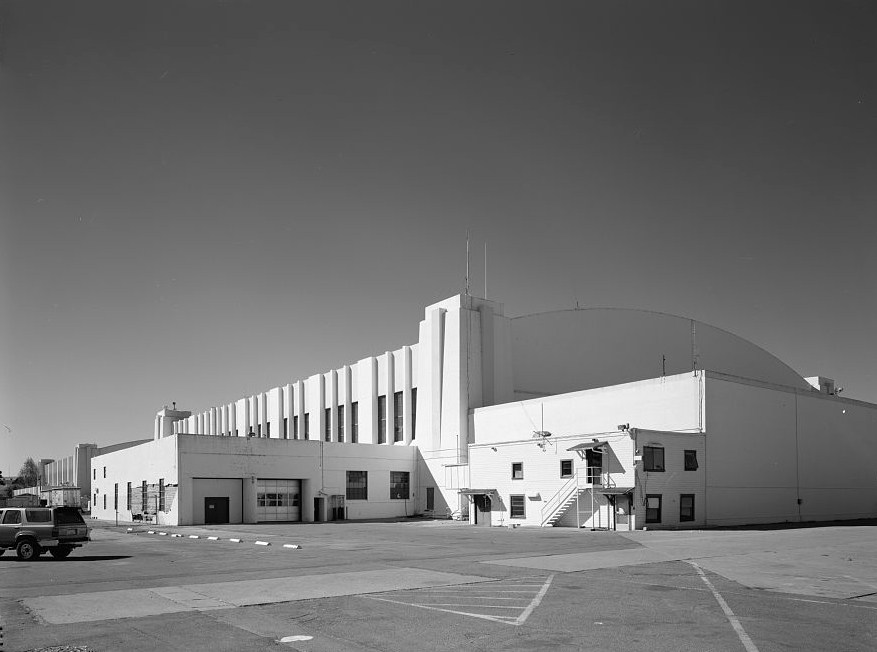
Palace of Fine and Decorative Arts, San Francisco

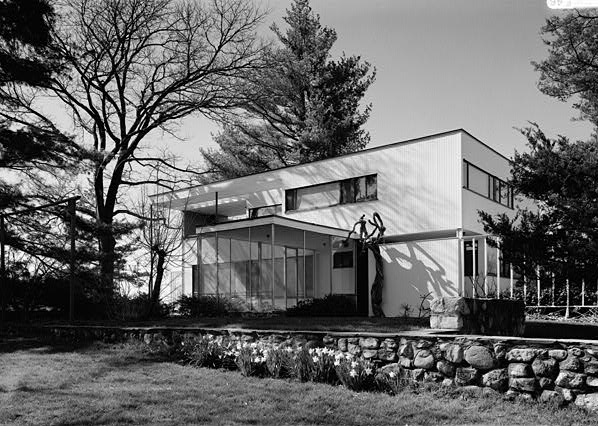
Gropius House in Lincoln, Massachusetts, USA

- The Reich Chancellery in Berlin, designed by Albert Speer (rebuilt).
- Great Mosque of Asmara in Italian Eritrea, designed by Guido Ferrazza.
- Church of the Epiphany, Gipton, Leeds, England, designed by Nugent Cachemaille-Day.
- Metro Theatre (Toronto), designed by Kaplan & Sprachman.
- Finsbury Health Centre, London, designed by Berthold Lubetkin and the Tecton Group.
- Metropolitan Water Board Laboratories, London, designed by Howard Robertson.
- Palace of Fine and Decorative Arts, Treasure Island, San Francisco Bay, California, USA, designed by George W. Kelham and William Peyton Day.
- Palace of Justice, Lima, Peru.
- City Hall, Mar del Plata, Argentina, designed by Alejandro Bustillo.
- Manchester Town Hall Extension, England, designed by Vincent Harris in 1927.
- São Bento Palace, Lisbon, Portugal.
- Kröller-Müller Museum, Otterlo, Netherlands, designed by Henry van de Velde.
- Helsinki Olympic Stadium, Finland, designed by Yrjö Lindegren and Toivo Jäntti.
- Brackenfell (house), Brampton, Carlisle, England, designed by Leslie Martin and Sadie Speight.
- The Homewood (house) near Esher, Surrey, England, designed by Patrick Gwynne (for his parents).
- Charters House, Berkshire, England, designed by Adie, Button and Partners.
- Hamstone House, St George's Hill, Weybridge, Surrey, designed by Ian Forbes.
- Middleton Park, Oxfordshire, England, the last great country house designed by Edwin Lutyens (with his son Robert).
- Houses in Hampshire, Sussex and at Eton, Berkshire in England by Marcel Breuer and F. R. S. Yorke.
- Gropius House, Lincoln, Massachusetts, designed by Walter Gropius with Marcel Breuer.
- Belvedere Court (apartments) in East Finchley, London, designed by Ernst L. Freud.
- Josephine M. Hagerty House, Cohasset, Massachusetts, designed by Walter Gropius with Marcel Breuer.
- Luma Tower, built as British Luma Co-Operative Electric Lamp factory, Glasgow, designed by Cornelius Armour.
- Fiat Tagliero Building, Asmara, Italian Eritrea, designed by Giuseppe Pettazzi.

== Other ==
- Construction work begins on
  - Mark Keppel High School in Alhambra, California, designed by Marston & Maybury.
  - Council House, Bristol, England, designed by Vincent Harris.

== Publications ==
- Lewis Mumford – The Culture of Cities

== Awards ==
- AIA Gold Medal – Paul Philippe Cret
- RIBA Royal Gold Medal – Ivar Tengbom
- Grand Prix de Rome, architecture: Henry Bernard

== Births ==
- February 23 – Liu Thai Ker, Singaporean architect and urban planner (died 2026)
- April 16 – Wolf Hilbertz, German-born futurist architect, inventor and marine scientist (died 2007)
- May 12 – Terry Farrell, English architect, designer of the KK100 and SIS Building (died 2025)
- July 10 – Paul Andreu, French airport architect (died 2018)
- July 14 – Moshe Safdie, Israeli/Canadian architect, urban designer, educator, theorist and author
- September 3 – Richard MacCormac, British architect (died 2014)
- November 30 – Andrea Branzi, Italian architect and designer (died 2023)
- December 30 – Susan Maxman, née Abel, American architect

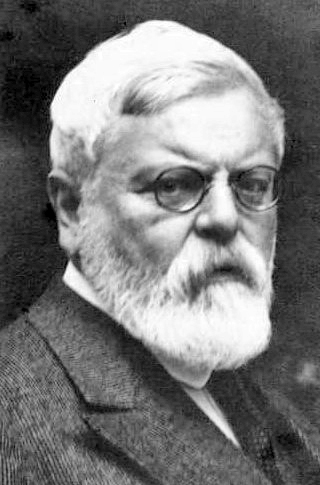
Theodor Fischer

== Deaths ==
- February 25 – W. D. Caröe, English-born ecclesiastical architect (born 1857)
- July 2 – John James Burnet, Scottish architect (born 1857)
- October 30 – Charles Klauder, American architect (born 1872)
- December 24 – Bruno Taut, German-born architect and urban planner (born 1880)
- December 25 – Theodor Fischer, German architect (born 1862)
