= 1817 in the United Kingdom =

Events from the year 1817 in the United Kingdom.

== Incumbents ==
- Monarch – George III
- Regent – George, Prince Regent
- Prime Minister – Robert Jenkinson, 2nd Earl of Liverpool (Tory)
- Foreign Secretary – Robert Stewart, Viscount Castlereagh
- Home Secretary – Lord Sidmouth
- Secretary of War – Lord Bathurst

== Events ==
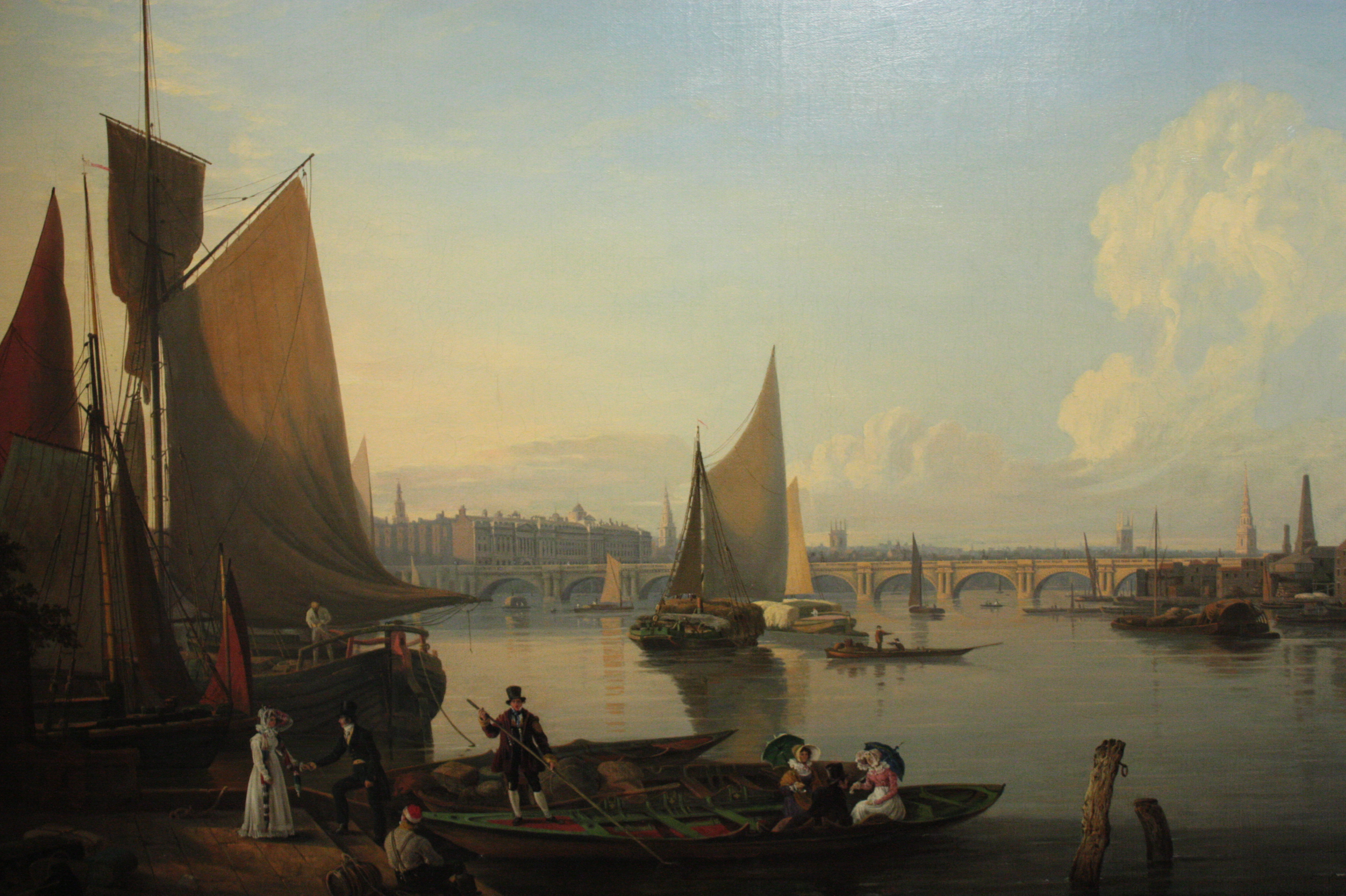
Waterloo Bridge opens June 1817. Waterloo Bridge and the Lambeth Waterfront from Westminster Stairs by Charles Deane

- January – The Black Dwarf is first published in London as a satirical radical unstamped newspaper by journalist Thomas Jonathan Wooler.
- 18 January – A grand banquet is held at Brighton Pavilion in honour of the visiting Grand Duke Nicholas of Russia. Hosted by the Prince Regent and attended by members of the government, it features over a hundred dishes.
- 20 January – HMS Jasper is wrecked in the vicinity of Plymouth Sound by hurricane-force winds with the loss of 65 lives.
- 25 January – The Scotsman is first published in Edinburgh as a liberal weekly newspaper by lawyer William Ritchie and customs official Charles Maclaren.
- 28 January - The Prince Regent addresses the House of Lords at the State Opening of Parliament. On leaving the Palace of Westminster, the Prince's carriage is attacked and a window broken.
- February – Last major Luddite attack, against lace-making machines in Loughborough.
- 4 March – Habeas corpus suspended amidst fears of insurrection (to January 1818).
- 10 March – The Blanketeers set out to march from Manchester to London; on 11 March, 160 are arrested at Stockport.
- 1 April – Blackwood's Magazine is launched as the Edinburgh Monthly Magazine, a Tory publication. In October the publisher, William Blackwood, relaunches it as Blackwood's Edinburgh Magazine.
- 3 April – 'Princess Caraboo' appears in Almondsbury in Gloucestershire.
- 9–10 June – Pentrich Rising: The Army prevents protesting labourers from Derbyshire, roused by an agent provocateur, marching on Nottingham.
- 18 June – Waterloo Bridge opens in London.
- 5 July – The Sovereign coin is reintroduced.
- 18–20 December – William Hone successfully defends himself in a London court on charges arising from his publication of political satires.
- 20 December – Publication together of Jane Austen's first and last completed novels, respectively Northanger Abbey and Persuasion, by John Murray in London (dated 1818), five months after the author's death at Winchester. Her brother Henry Austen contributes a biographical note which for the first time publicly identifies her as the author of all her (previously anonymous) novels.

=== Undated ===
- Dulwich Picture Gallery in London, designed by John Soane as Britain's first purpose-built public art gallery, is completed and opened to the general public.
- Elgin Marbles displayed in British Museum.
- John Kidd extracts naphthalene from coal tar.
- A typhus epidemic occurs in Edinburgh and Glasgow.
- John Constable paints Flatford Mill.
- Gas lighting is introduced on stage in London's West End theatres: on 6 August by The English Opera House (extended to the auditorium on 8 September) and on 6 September at the Theatre Royal, Drury Lane (where it is already installed in the auditorium and foyer) and Theatre Royal, Covent Garden (as a demonstration).
- Approximate date – Britain's longest tramroad tunnel is opened at Blaenavon, more than a mile (2400m) in length.

== Publications ==
- Jane Austen's novels Northanger Abbey and Persuasion.
- Lord Byron's dramatic poem Manfred.
- Samuel Taylor Coleridge's Biographia Literaria.
- Thomas Moore's poem Lalla Rookh: an oriental romance.
- Thomas Love Peacock's novel Melincourt.
- David Ricardo's treatise On the Principles of Political Economy and Taxation.
- Thomas Rickman's An Attempt to discriminate the Styles of English Architecture from the Conquest to the Reformation, the first systematic treatise on Gothic architecture.
- Walter Scott's anonymous novel Rob Roy.
- Percy Bysshe Shelley's travelogue History of a Six Weeks' Tour (largely the work of Mary Shelley) and poem Hymn to Intellectual Beauty.

== Births ==
- 6 January – James Joseph McCarthy, architect (died 1882)
- 8 January – Sir Theophilus Shepstone, British-born South African statesman (died 1893)
- 23 January – John Cassell, publisher and entrepreneur (died 1865)
- 29 January – John Callcott Horsley, painter (died 1903)
- 23 February – George Frederic Watts, painter and sculptor (died 1904)
- 13 April – George Holyoake, secularist and promoter of the cooperative movement (died 1906)
- 1 June – David Lyall, botanist (died 1895)
- 30 June – Joseph Dalton Hooker, botanist (died 1911)
- 5 July – John Loughborough Pearson, Gothic architect (died 1897)
- 15 July – John Fowler, civil engineer (died 1898)
- 1 August – Richard Dadd, painter (died insane 1886)
- 13 December – Arthur Hill Hassall, physician, microbiologist and chemical analyst (died 1894)

== Deaths ==
- 8 February – Francis Horner, Scottish politician, economist (born 1778)
- 18 July – Jane Austen, novelist (born 1775)
- 31 July – Benjamin Hall, Welsh ironmaster and politician (born 1778)
- 13 October – Julius Caesar Ibbetson, landscape painter (born 1759)
- 6 November – Princess Charlotte, daughter of the Prince and Princess of Wales and second in line to the throne (born 1796)
- 7 December – William Bligh, admiral (born 1754)
- 27 December – Sir Richard Onslow, 1st Baronet, naval commander (born 1741)
- 28 December – Charles Burney, classical scholar and book collector (born 1757)
