= Wellington Harbour Board Head Office and Bond Store =

Bond Store
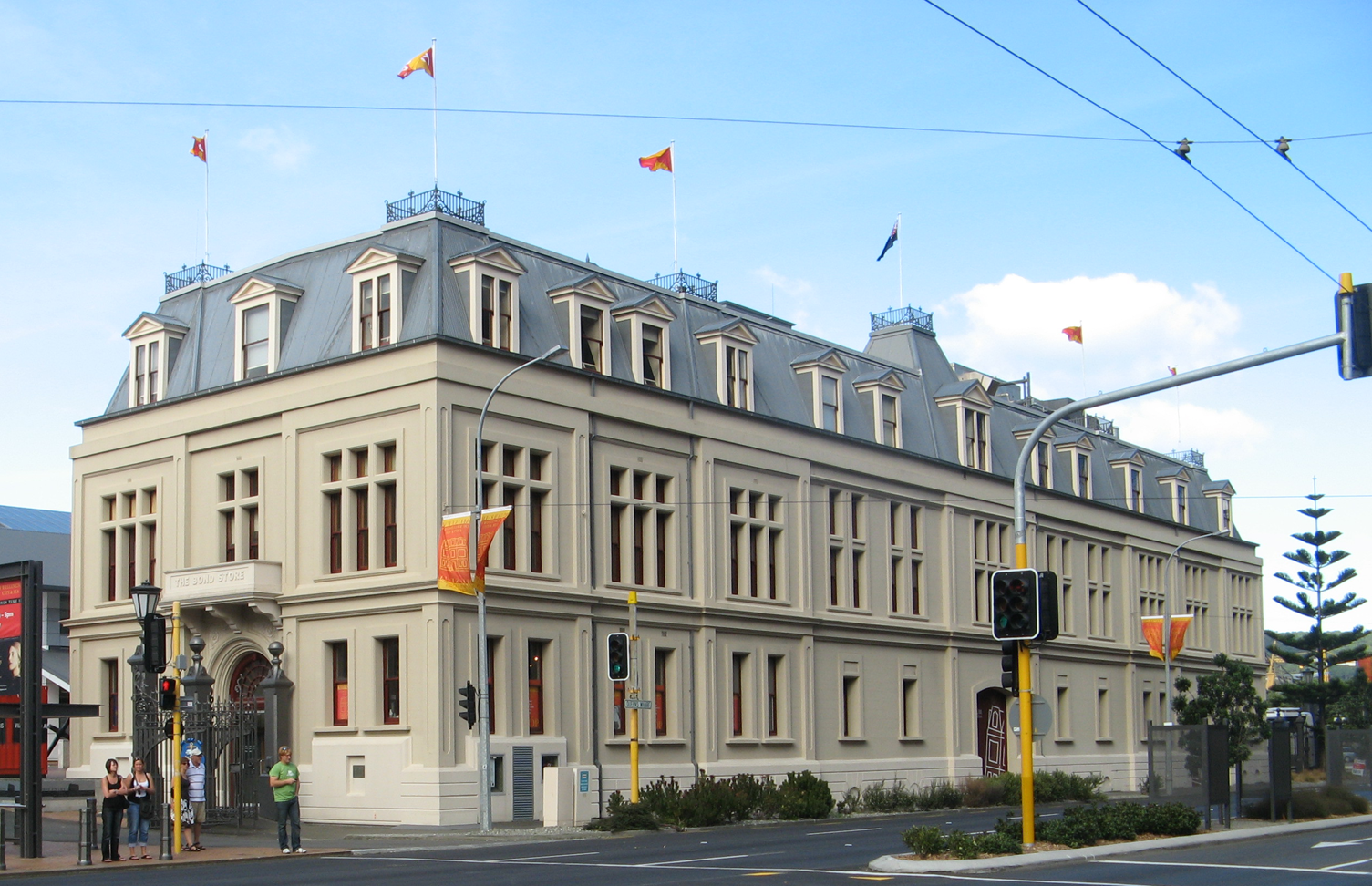
- Interactive map of the Bond Store area
- Former names: Wellington Harbour Board Head Office and Bond Store

General information
- Architectural style: French Second Empire
- Location: Jervois Quay, Wellington, New Zealand
- Coordinates: 41.285161°S 174.778039°E
- Current tenants: Wellington Museum
- Completed: 1892

Design and construction
- Architect: Frederick de Jersey Clere

Heritage New Zealand – Category 1
- Designated: 18-Mar-1982
- Reference no.: 234

Wellington Harbour Board Head Office and Bond Store is a historic building on Jervois Quay in Wellington, New Zealand. The building currently houses the Wellington Museum.

It was commissioned in 1890 by the Wellington Harbour Board to replace wooden buildings from the 1860s, designed by Frederick de Jersey Clere in the French Second Empire style, with construction starting in 1891 and finishing in 1892.

The building was owned by the Wellington Harbour Board, but in 1989 with the reorganisation of local bodies throughout New Zealand, the commercial functions of the Harbour Board were transferred to a new port company (now known as CentrePort Wellington) owned jointly by Greater Wellington Regional Council, and Horizons Regional Council. Some property owned by the Harbour Board was transferred to the Wellington City Council.

The building, now known as the Bond Store, is classified as a Category 1 Historic Place (places of "special or outstanding historical or cultural heritage significance or value") by Heritage New Zealand.
