= Samuel Gilbert Scott =

American stunt performer

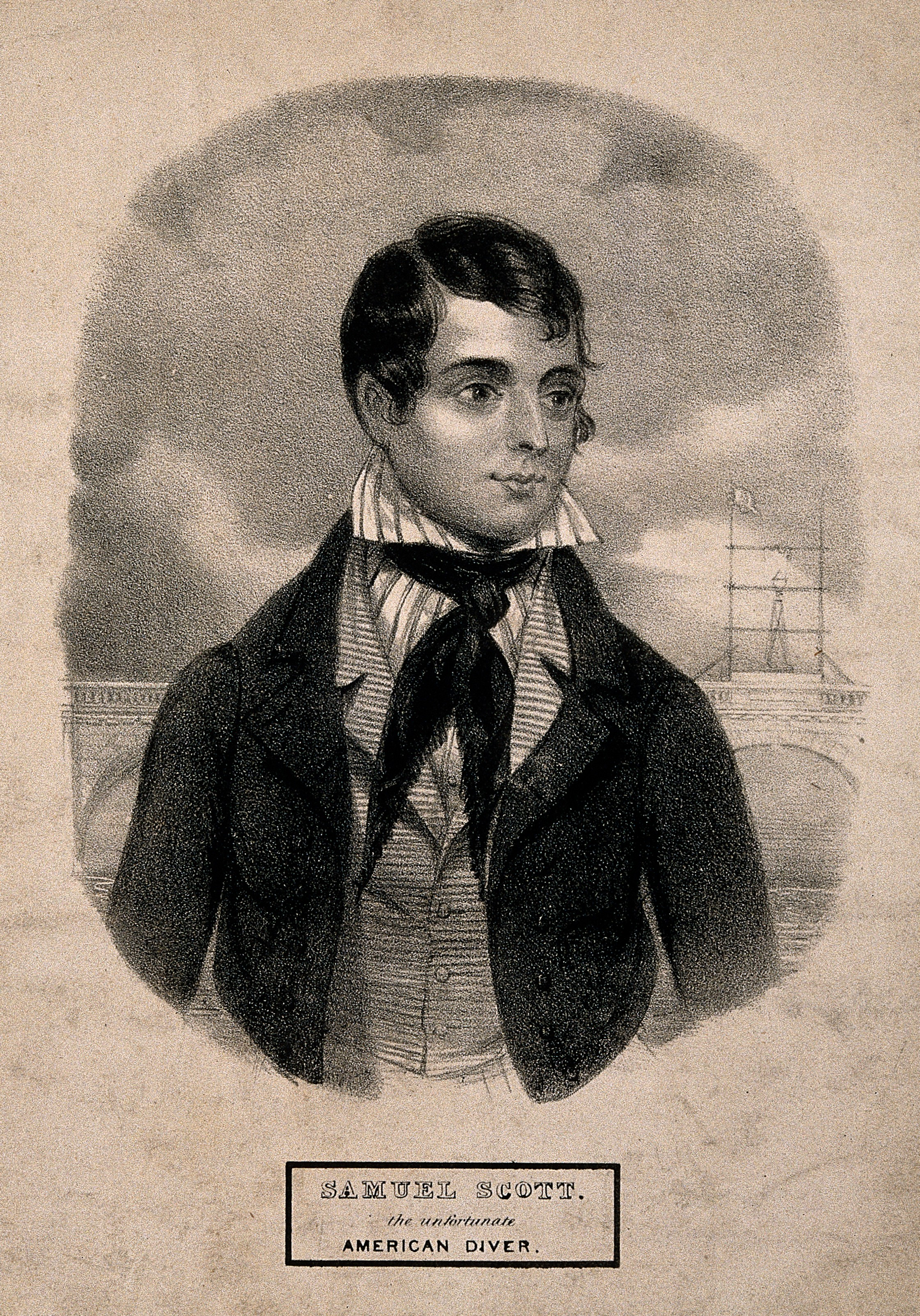
Samuel Scott, a diver

Samuel Gilbert Scott (c. 1813 – January 11, 1841) was an American daredevil who was killed performing a stunt at Waterloo Bridge in London, England.

For his act, Scott often swung from a rope by his feet and neck before jumping. During a performance in Deptford, the rope accidentally slipped around his neck and nearly strangled him. He was rescued by a bystander. Scott went on to perform the same act at Waterloo Bridge, and accidentally hanged himself from a scaffold.

== Navy veteran and start of his diving career ==
Scott was born in Philadelphia, Pennsylvania, and served in the United States Navy, where he became well known for jumping off the masts of Navy vessels. Upon leaving the Navy he became a professional stuntman, passing the hat for contributions after his performances. Scott performed stunts in Boston, Massachusetts, Philadelphia and on the St. Lawrence River. He dived from a precipice near Niagara Falls, reported in newspapers as a 593-foot (181 m) jump, although historians consider this figure to be impossible. Scott also worked as a bartender in Rochester, New York, where Sam Patch had jumped to his death from the High Falls in 1829.

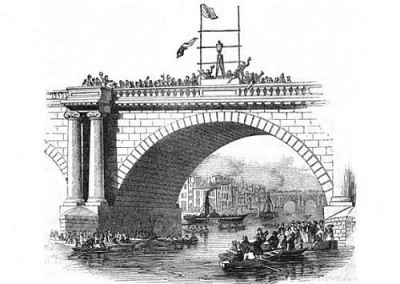
Samuel Gilbert Scott jumps from a scaffold on Waterloo Bridge

== Working in England ==
Around 1837, Scott traveled to England to continue his diving career. He dove 100 feet (30 m) in Manchester, 167 feet (51 m) in Liverpool, and jumped from a 140-foot (43 m) scaffold at the Chain Pier, Brighton. On the battleship St. Joseph, moored in Devonport, he jumped from a 200-foot (61 m) topmast. In Cornwall, Scott allegedly jumped from a 240-foot (73 m) cliff into 8 feet (2.4 m) of water; this achievement exceeds the current world record high dive, and is also considered unlikely.

Performances in England continued in 1838, including a 60-foot (18 m) leap from the topmast of a barque into the docks at Gloucester in early October, and a promised jump from a 100-foot (30 m) scaffold into a pond at the Pittville Hotel in Cheltenham.

== Nearly-fatal accident and help from a bystander ==
Scott was nearly killed in an accident while performing on an American ship in Deptford. He often swung from a rope by his feet and neck before jumping. While he was doing so in Deptford, the rope accidentally slipped around his neck and nearly strangled him. Scott was saved only by the quick thinking of a sailor who caught his feet and supported him, allowing Scott to loosen the rope. Scott's comment to the crowd after this accident was, "The hemp that is to hang me is not grown yet!"

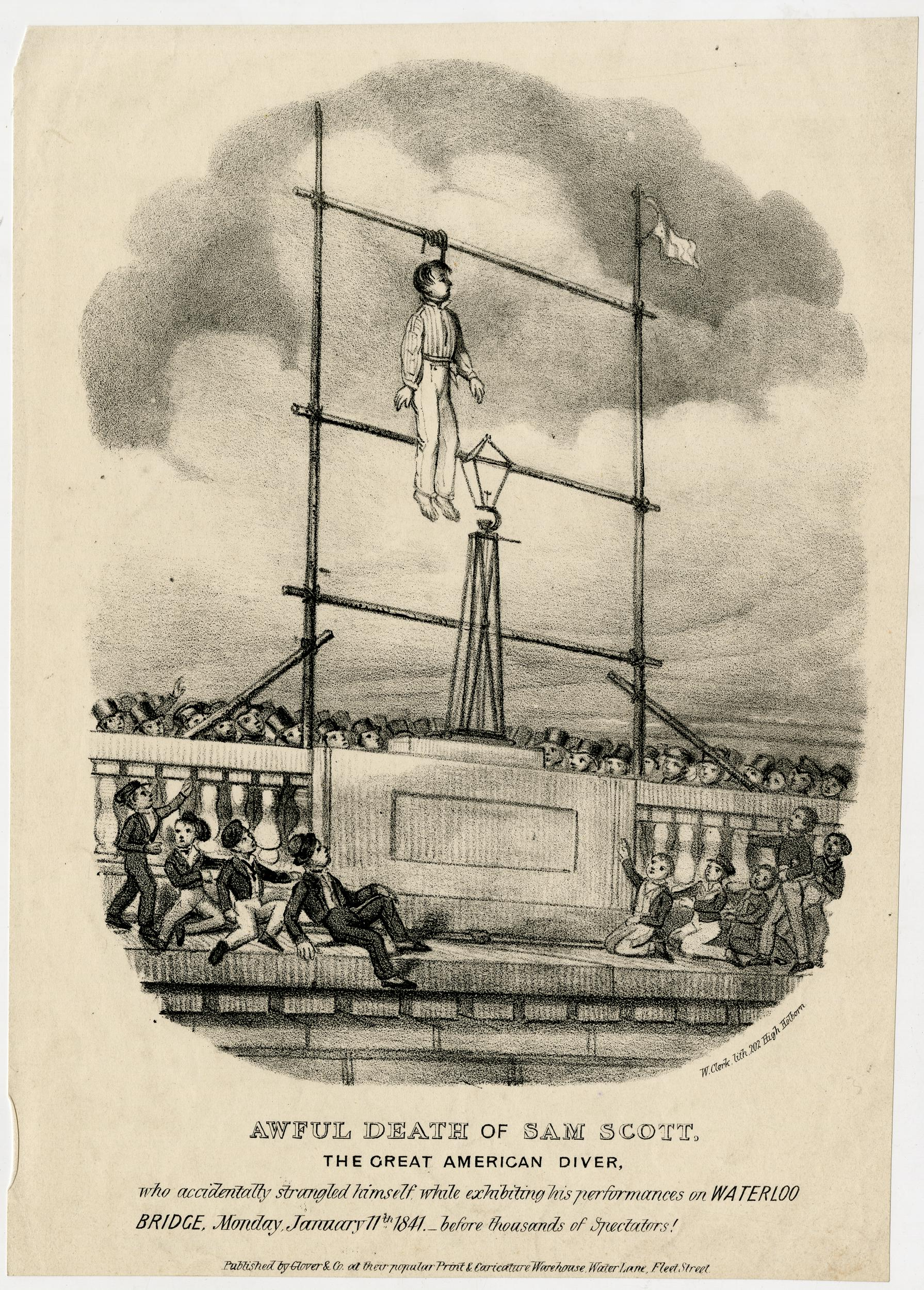
Awful Death of Sam Scott

== Fatal accident and inaction by the spectators ==
On January 11, 1841, Scott planned to run from the White Lion Pub in Drury Lane to Waterloo Bridge, jump from a scaffold on the bridge into the river, and return to the pub during the hour between 1:00 and 2:00 P.M. Upon arrival at the bridge, Scott began swinging from a noose attached to the scaffold. Once again, the noose slipped and tightened around Scott's neck. As had also happened in Deptford, the spectators erroneously thought that this was part of Scott's act, and no immediate action was taken. Eventually, one man in the crowd insisted that Scott be cut down, but it was too late. According to a contemporary broadside, Scott "was immediately taken to Charing Cross Hospital, where every attention was paid to him, but unfortunately without effect, as life was quite extinct."

== Marriage in Cornwall ==
There were conflicting reports of Scott's marital status, but he married at least once. This was in Falmouth, Cornwall, in December 1839, to Miss Mary Ann Cosier of Penryn. According to The Times of London, Scott was residing with his wife in Deptford at the time of his death. His wife usually accompanied him to his performances, but was not present on the occasion of his fatal accident.

== Comments by 19th-century writers ==
Thomas Carlyle mentioned Scott's death in a letter to his brother Alexander Carlyle, written on January 15, 1841. In Carlyle's words:

A wretched mortal that was wont to leap from top masts, bridges &c, and dive and do feats of that kind, perished in a shocking manner (as you will see by that Newspaper) here this week. One of his tricks was to act hanging; the noose slipt; he was found hanged in earnest! When I think of the mob looking at him, brutal animals, the still more brutal 'gentlemen' of the Bridge Committee encouraging such a scene,—few things I have ever heard of seem more detestable.

The case is further mentioned in Alfred Swaine Taylor's Manual of Medical Jurisprudence, 6th American edition (Philadelphia 1866), p. 339, albeit giving a wrong year:

The death of Scott, the American diver, in January, 1840, shows how readily asphyxia may be induced by a slight compression of the throat, even when a person might be supposed to have both the knowledge and the power to save himself ... No attempt was made to save him until it was too late, and he was not brought to a hospital until thirty-three minutes had elapsed. He was allowed to hang thirteen minutes –– the spectators thinking that the deceased was prolonging the experiment for their gratification!
