= Paddy the Wanderer =

Airedale Terrier from Wellington, New Zealand

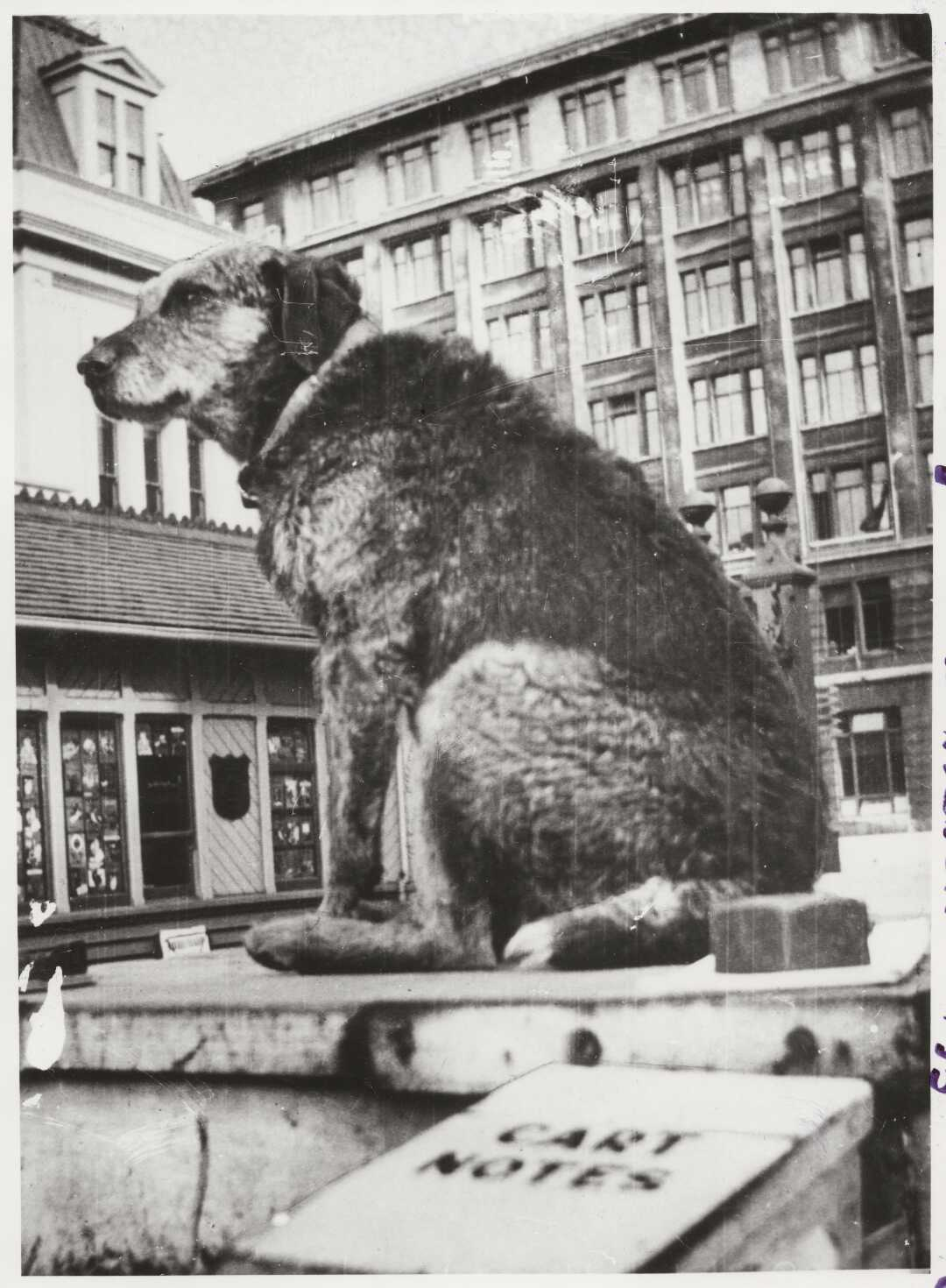
- Other name: The Irish Flying Dutchman
- Breed: Airedale Terrier
- Died: 17 July 1939 (aged 11+); Wellington, New Zealand
- Occupation: Assistant Night Watchman
- Employer: Wellington Harbour Board

Paddy the Wanderer was an Airedale Terrier who roamed the streets of Wellington, New Zealand, during the Great Depression. He was a friend of cabbies, workers, and seamen alike, who took turns at paying his dog licence every year. Paddy was known for greeting sailors in the port at Wellington and accompanying them, as a stowaway, on their coastal steamers.

Paddy the Wanderer, according to a telephone call made to The Evening Post a day after his death, had been given to the daughter of Mrs. R. Gardner of Wellington by a horse trainer from Christchurch. After the child died, eleven years earlier, the dog ran away. According to Dianne Haworth's 2007 biography, the child had died of pneumonia; after her death, Paddy wandered the Wellington waterfront and occasionally took trips on visiting ships. He had crossed the Tasman Sea many times, and had flown in a Gypsy Moth. He was rumoured to have made it to San Francisco and back. Wellington Harbour Board adopted Paddy under the formal title of Assistant Night Watchman, whose job it was to keep guard for "pirates, smugglers and rodents". Haworth also reports that apparently Paddy had almost fallen victim to a dognapping scheme perpetrated by jealous citizens of Auckland.

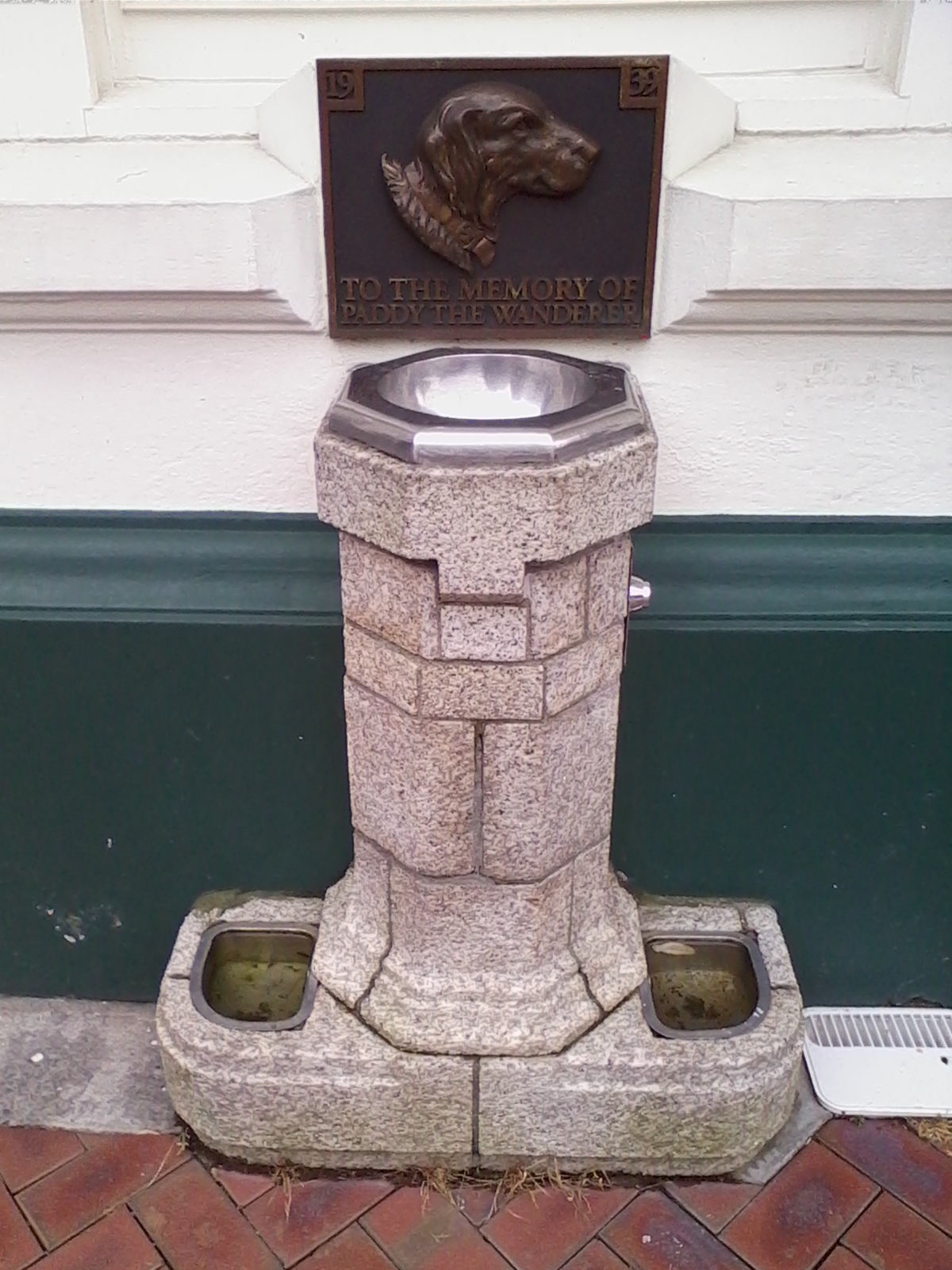
The memorial fountain for Paddy the Wanderer, Wellington

He died on 17 July 1939 at Harbour Shed no. 1, apparently after a cold snap, and was taken to his funeral in a parade of twelve taxicabs and a traffic officer. According to Haworth, the city was brought to a standstill for the ceremony. The Ladies' auxiliary of the local SPCA took up donations in his name for a memorial. Including Haworth's 1997 Paddy the Wanderer, three biographies of the dog have been published. There is a monument to Paddy on Queen's Wharf, opposite the Wellington Museum, which includes his bronze likeness, a drinking fountain and drinking bowls below for dogs. Erected in 1945, it was paid for by Paddy's many friends and includes stones from London's Waterloo Bridge, bombed during World War II.

== See also ==
- List of individual dogs
