= Waterloo Bridge =

Bridge in London, England

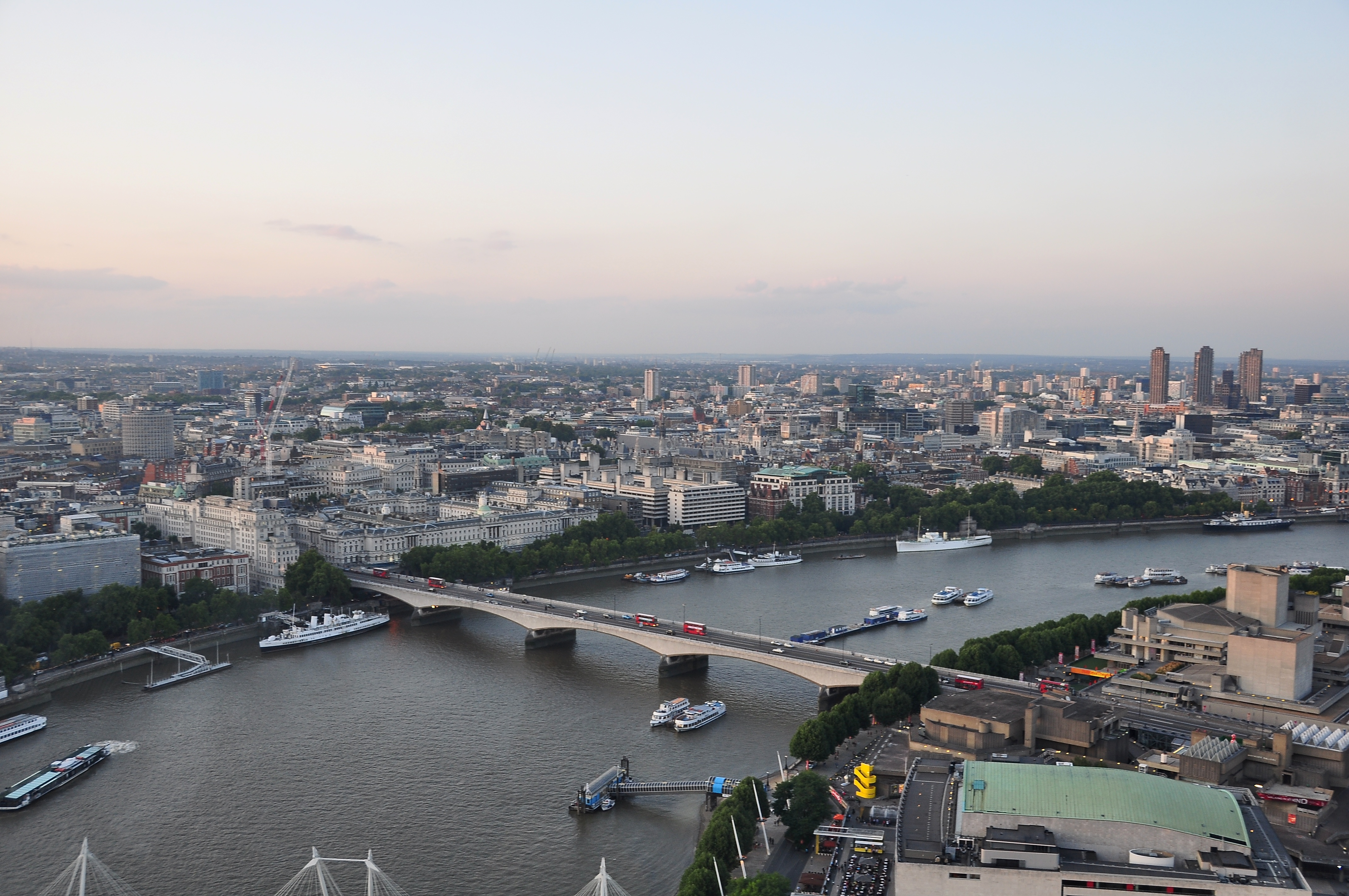
- River Thames and Waterloo Bridge (as seen from the London Eye)
- Coordinates: 51°30′31″N 0°07′01″W
- Carries: A301 road
- Crosses: River Thames
- Locale: London
- Named for: Battle of Waterloo
- Maintained by: Transport for London
- Heritage status: Grade II* listed structure
- Preceded by: Hungerford Bridge and Golden Jubilee Bridges
- Followed by: Blackfriars Bridge

Characteristics
- Design: Cantilever Bridge and; Box girder bridge
- Total length: 1,230 feet (370 m)
- Width: 80 feet (24 m)
- Longest span: 233 feet (71 m)

History
- Opened: (first bridge) 18 June 1817; 209 years ago (second bridge) 11 March 1942; 84 years ago

Location
- Interactive map of Waterloo Bridge

Waterloo Bridge (/ˌwɔːtəˈluː/) is a road and foot traffic bridge crossing the River Thames in London, between Blackfriars Bridge and Hungerford Bridge and Golden Jubilee Bridges. Its name commemorates the victory of the British, Dutch and Prussians at the Battle of Waterloo in 1815. Thanks to its location at a strategic bend in the river, the bridge offers good views of Westminster, the South Bank and the London Eye to the west, and of the City of London and Canary Wharf to the east.

The bridge was given Grade II* listed structure protection in 1981.

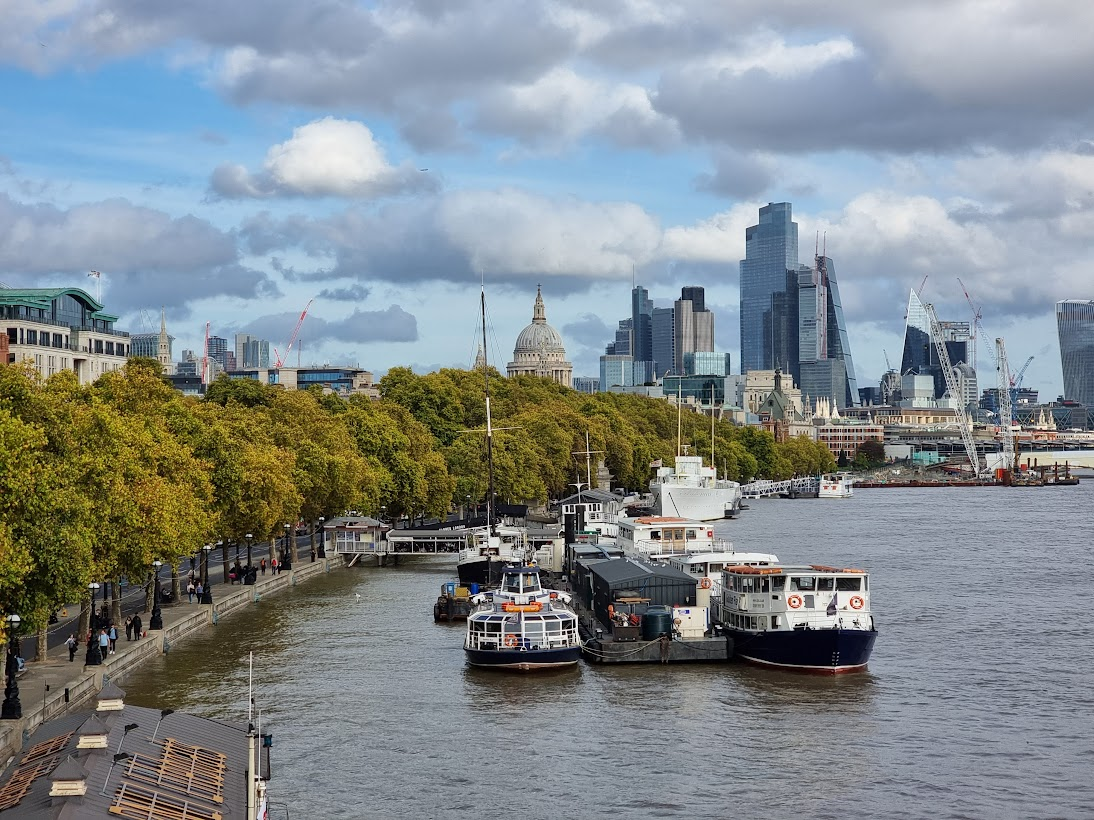
View towards the City of London from Waterloo Bridge

== History ==
=== First bridge ===
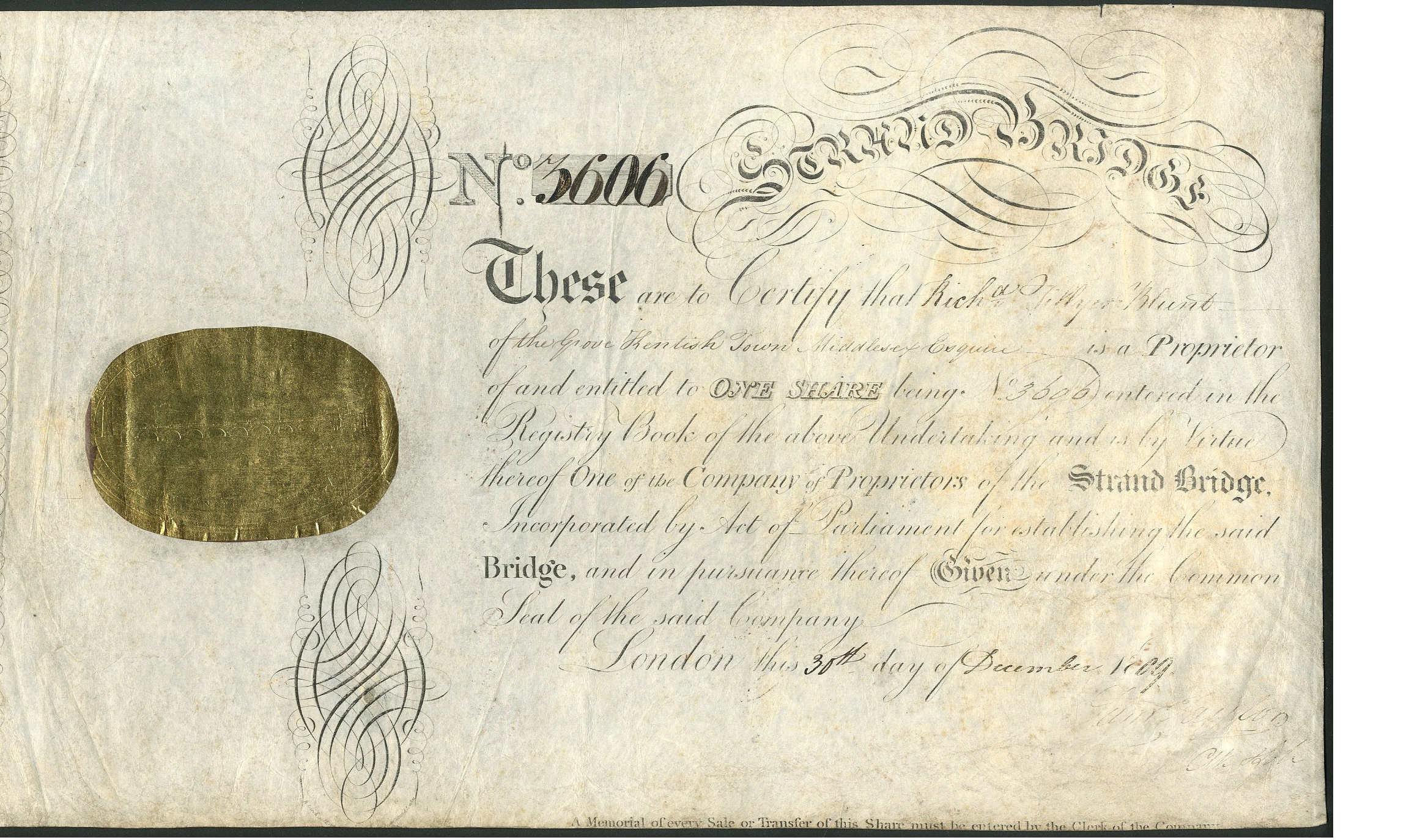
Share of the Company of Proprietors of the Strand Bridge, issued 30 December 1809

Strand Bridge Act 1809
- Act of Parliament
- Parliament of the United Kingdom
- Long title: An Act for building a Bridge over the River Thames from the Precinct of the Savoy, or near thereunto, in the County of Middlesex, to the opposite Shore, and for making, convenient Roads and Avenues to communicate therewith, in the County of Surrey.
- Citation: 49 Geo. 3. c. cxci

Dates
- Royal assent: 20 June 1809
Other legislation
| Amended by | Strand Bridge Act 1813 |
| Repealed by | Local Law (Greater London Council and Inner London Boroughs) Order 1965 (SI 1965/540) |

Status: Repealed

Text of statute as originally enacted

Strand Bridge Act 1813
- Act of Parliament
- Parliament of the United Kingdom
- Long title: An Act for altering, enlarging, and extending the Powers of an Act of His present Majesty, for building a Bridge over the River Thames, at the Precinct of the Savoy, or near thereunto; and making Roads and Avenues to communicate therewith, in the Counties of Middlesex and Surrey.
- Citation: 53 Geo. 3. c. clxxxiv

Dates
- Royal assent: 2 July 1813
Other legislation
| Amends | Strand Bridge Act 1809 |
| Repealed by | Local Law (Greater London Council and Inner London Boroughs) Order 1965 (SI 1965/540) |

Status: Repealed

Text of statute as originally enacted

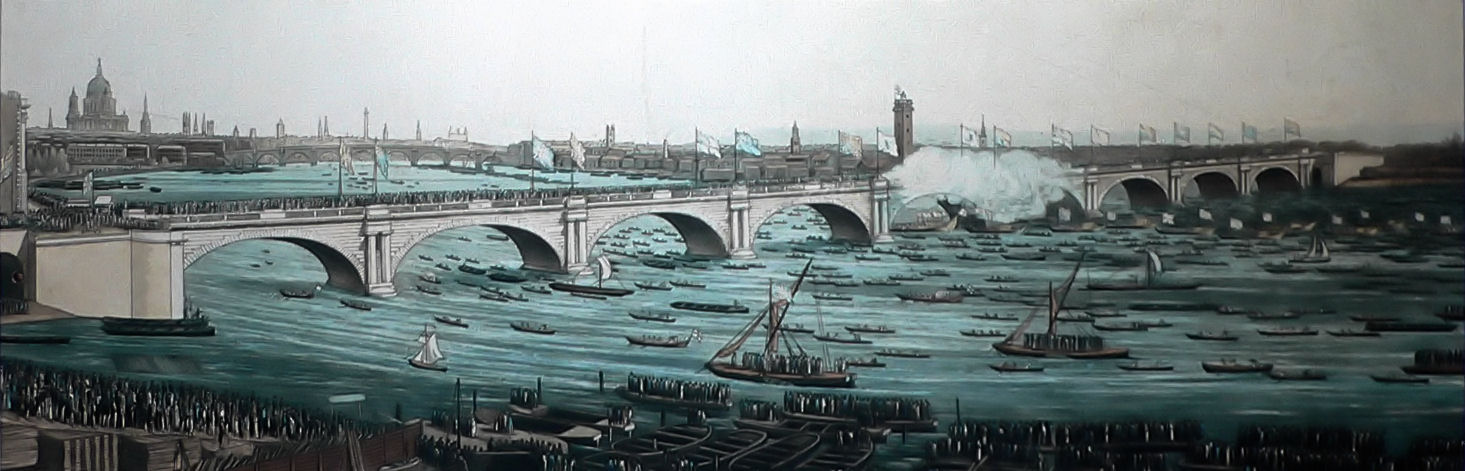
Crowds attend the opening of the first Waterloo Bridge on 18 June 1817

The first bridge on the site was designed in 1809–10 by John Rennie for the Company of Proprietors of the Strand Bridge Company). The company built the bridge privately, in return for charging tolls to cross it.

Toll Gate at North End of Waterloo Bridge, 1833

Originally named 'the Strand Bridge', after the Battle of Waterloo the Waterloo Bridge and Approaches Act 1816 (56 Geo. 3. c. lxiii) renamed it 'the Waterloo Bridge'. It opened in 1817 as a toll bridge.

The bridge was built with granite from quarries at Mabe in Cornwall and had nine arches, each of 120 feet (36.6 m) span, separated by double doric stone columns, and was 2,456 feet (748.6 m) long, including approaches–1,240 feet (378.0 m) between abutments–and 42 feet (12.8 m) wide between the parapets with a 27 feet 6 inches (8.38 m) roadway.

Waterloo Bridge was considered Rennie's masterpiece and was the most prestigious bridge project in England, described as 'perhaps the finest large masonry bridge ever built in this or any other country'. The Italian sculptor Canova called it 'the noblest bridge in the world' and said that 'it is worth going to England solely to see Rennie's bridge.'

In 1832, Michael Faraday tried to measure the potential difference between each side of the bridge caused by the ebbing salt water flowing through the Earth's magnetic field using magnetohydrodynamics.

During the 1840s the bridge gained a reputation as a popular place for suicide attempts. In 1841, the American daredevil Samuel Gilbert Scott was killed while performing an act in which he hung by a rope from a scaffold on the bridge. In 1844 Thomas Hood wrote the poem "The Bridge of Sighs", which concerns the suicide of a prostitute there.

Between 1865 and 1870 the Victoria Embankment was built through the northernmost arch and the Waterloo Steps were built to connect the footways on either side of Wellington Street to the Embankment. At the time, a letter to Herapath's Railway Journal stated that construction of the Embankment would divert the flow of the river and, in time, undermine the piers of the bridge. The western steps were removed in 1907-1908 to allow the Kingsway Tramway Subway to connect to the Embankment.

The bridge was freed from toll in 1878, the proprietors being paid £475,000 compensation. It was placed under the control of the Metropolitan Board of Works, which was abolished in 1889, its responsibilities being assumed by the London County Council.

Claude Monet - Waterloo Bridge, London, Sun Effect, 1899-1901

The bridge was depicted by the French Impressionist Claude Monet in his series of 41 works from 1900 to 1904, and by the English Romantic John Constable, whose painting depicting its opening is displayed at Anglesey Abbey in Cambridgeshire.

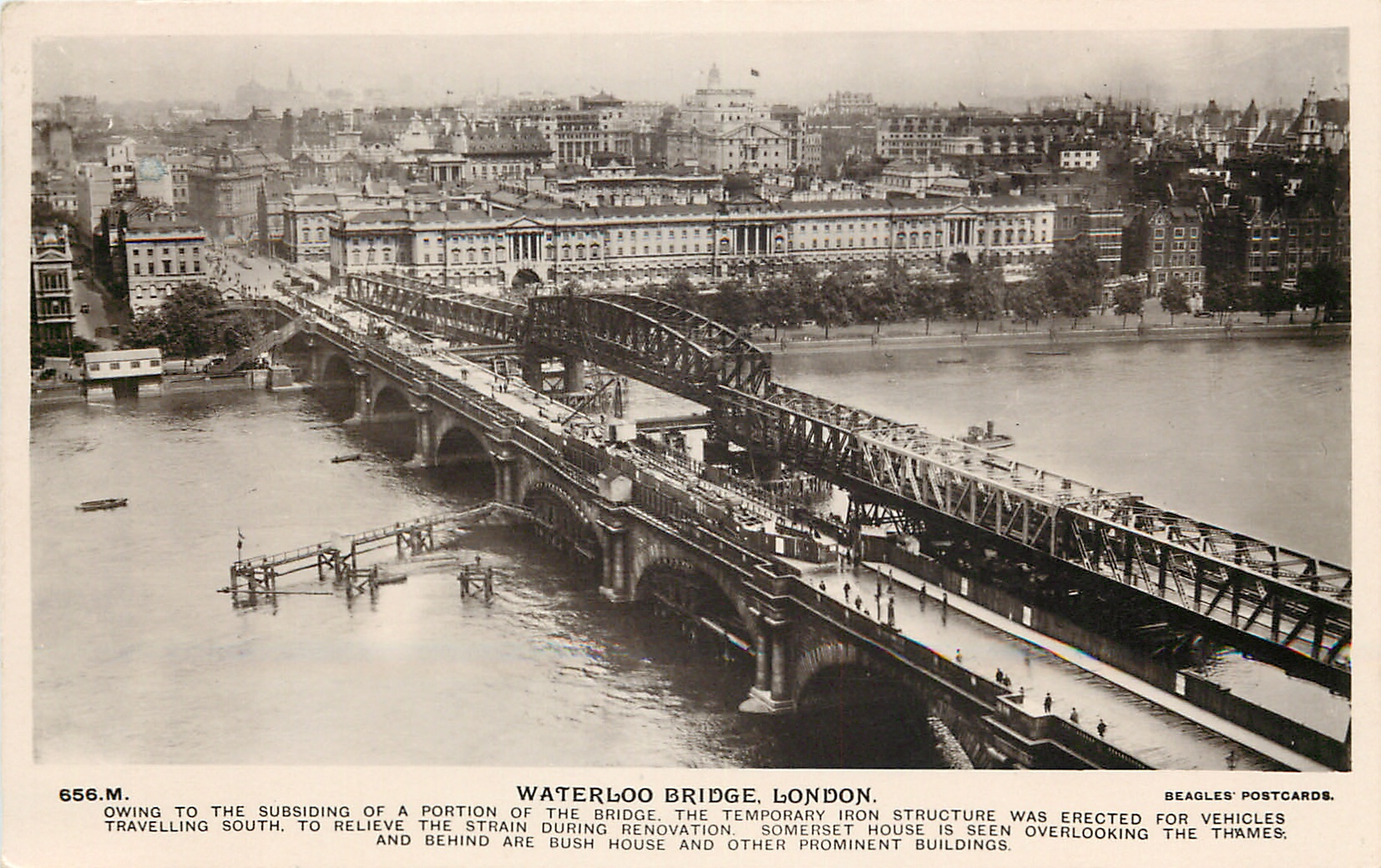
Waterloo Bridge, early 1930s (Note: The temporary bridge is complete, so this is after August 1925. The old bridge is closed to vehicles, which happened while the temporary bridge was being built and in the early 1930s before demolition began.)

Serious problems were found in Rennie's bridge piers from 1884 onward, after scour from the river flow (which had increased following the demolition of Old London Bridge) damaged their foundations. By the 1920s the problems had increased, and in May 1924 the bridge was closed to traffic and work undertaken to check the settlement (Note: The Report of the Royal Commission on Cross-river Traffic (p.25) records the settlement since 1820 of pier 5 as 28" in March 1925 with pier 6 as 11". Apart from the pier at the Lambeth shore, other piers had settled by between 3" and 7".), lighten the bridge deck over the arches either side of pier five and install wooden centering beneath them..

The bridge reopened in July 1924 with a weight limit of 10 tons and a speed limit of 3mph at piers four - six. Meanwhile construction of a temporary bridge was put in hand and it was completed in August 1925, taking southbound traffic while northbound traffic used the old bridge.

=== Second bridge ===
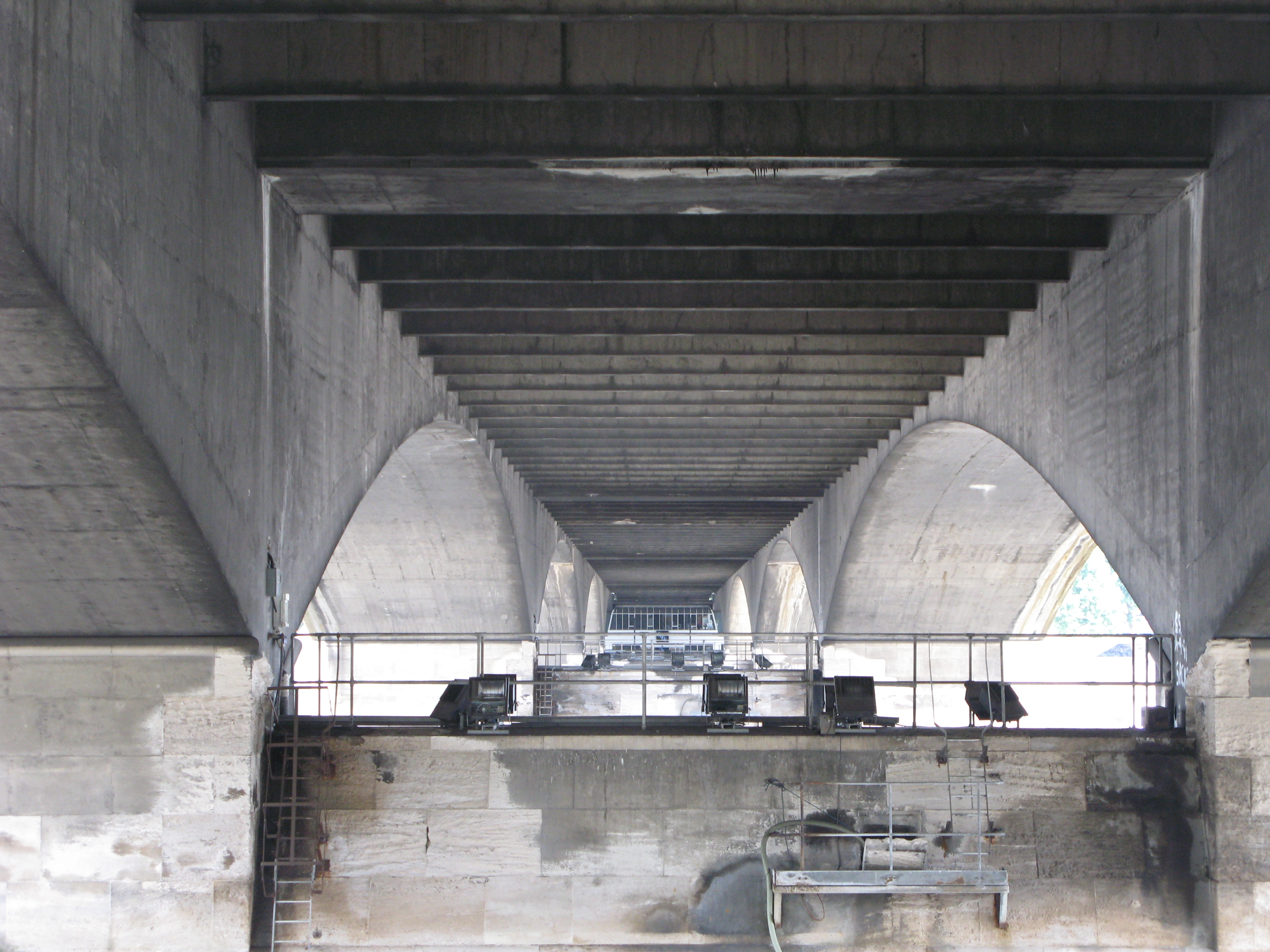
The design called for supporting beams only at the outside edges, to bring "light and sweetness" to the underside—Giles Gilbert Scott, quoted in Hopkins (1970). It also allowed the Kingsway Tramway Subway to continue to operate.

In the 1930s, London County Council decided to demolish the bridge and replace it with a new structure designed by Sir Giles Gilbert Scott. The engineers were Ernest Buckton and John Cuerel of Rendel Palmer & Tritton. The project was placed on hold due to the Second World War.

By his own admission, Scott was no engineer, and it was difficult to implement his design. The design showed five arches but, as implemented, none of the "arches" is structurally an arch. The central one is a cantilever bridge with a central suspended deck. (Note: Two expansion joints 28m apart are visible across the road surface on either side of the centre of the central "arch". These continue as vertical breaks in the side of the bridge and can be seen from the river.) The two pairs of "arches" either side of the central one are reinforced-concrete box-girder bridges with separate box girders at each side (see the view from below). Unlike ordinary box girders, these are of variable (rather than uniform) depth "to look as much like arches as ... beams can". The box girders extend as cantilevers beyond the pier next the shore and next the centre with separate short box girders as part of the suspended central section of the central "arch".

The beams are clad in Portland stone, which is cleaned by rain and which matches the neighbouring Somerset House. To guard against the possibility of further subsidence from scour, each pier was given a number of jacks that can be used to level the structure.

Construction of the new bridge began in 1937 and it was partially opened on Tuesday 11 March 1942 and "officially opened" in September 1942. However, it was not fully completed until 1945. It is the only Thames bridge to have been damaged by German bombers during the Second World War.

The building contractor was Peter Lind & Company. At the outbreak of war, despite an immediate order being issued by the Ministry of Transport, that the bridge construction was of national importance, the supply of male labour to execute the heavy works became acute. From the start of the war through to the bridge completion, women became the preponderant members of the construction workforce. This resulted in the project being referred to for many years as "The Ladies' Bridge". Lind used elm wood from the old bridge for the dining room floor of Hamstone House, his house that he commissioned and built in 1938 at St George's Hill in Surrey.

Georgi Markov, a Bulgarian dissident, was assassinated on Waterloo Bridge on 7 September 1978 by agents of the Bulgarian secret police, the Committee for State Security, possibly assisted by the Soviet security agency, the KGB. He was killed with a poisoned pellet possibly fired from an umbrella.

=== Reuse of original parts ===
Granite stones from the original bridge were subsequently presented to various parts of the British world to further historic links in the British Commonwealth of Nations. Two of these stones are in Canberra, the capital city of Australia, sited between the parallel spans of the Commonwealth Avenue Bridge, one of two major crossings of Lake Burley Griffin in the heart of the city. Stones from the bridge were also used to build a monument in Wellington, New Zealand, to Paddy the Wanderer, a dog that roamed the wharves from 1928 to 1939 and was befriended by seamen, watersiders, Harbour Board workers and taxi drivers. The monument, built in 1945, is on Queens Wharf, opposite the Wellington Museum. It includes a bronze likeness of Paddy, a drinking fountain, and drinking bowls below for dogs.

Another piece of the stone is situated under the sundial in the Wellington Boat Harbour Park, next to Clyde Quay Marina, an area of historical significance in Wellington Harbour. Several stone balusters from the demolished bridge were sent in the late 1930s by the author Dornford Yates to be used in his French home 'Cockade', but the Fall of France in 1940 interrupted this project. They were shipped after the war to his new house in Umtali, Rhodesia (now Mutare, Zimbabwe).

Recovered timbers from the bridge were used for shelves and wall panels in the library at Anglesey Abbey.

== Geography ==
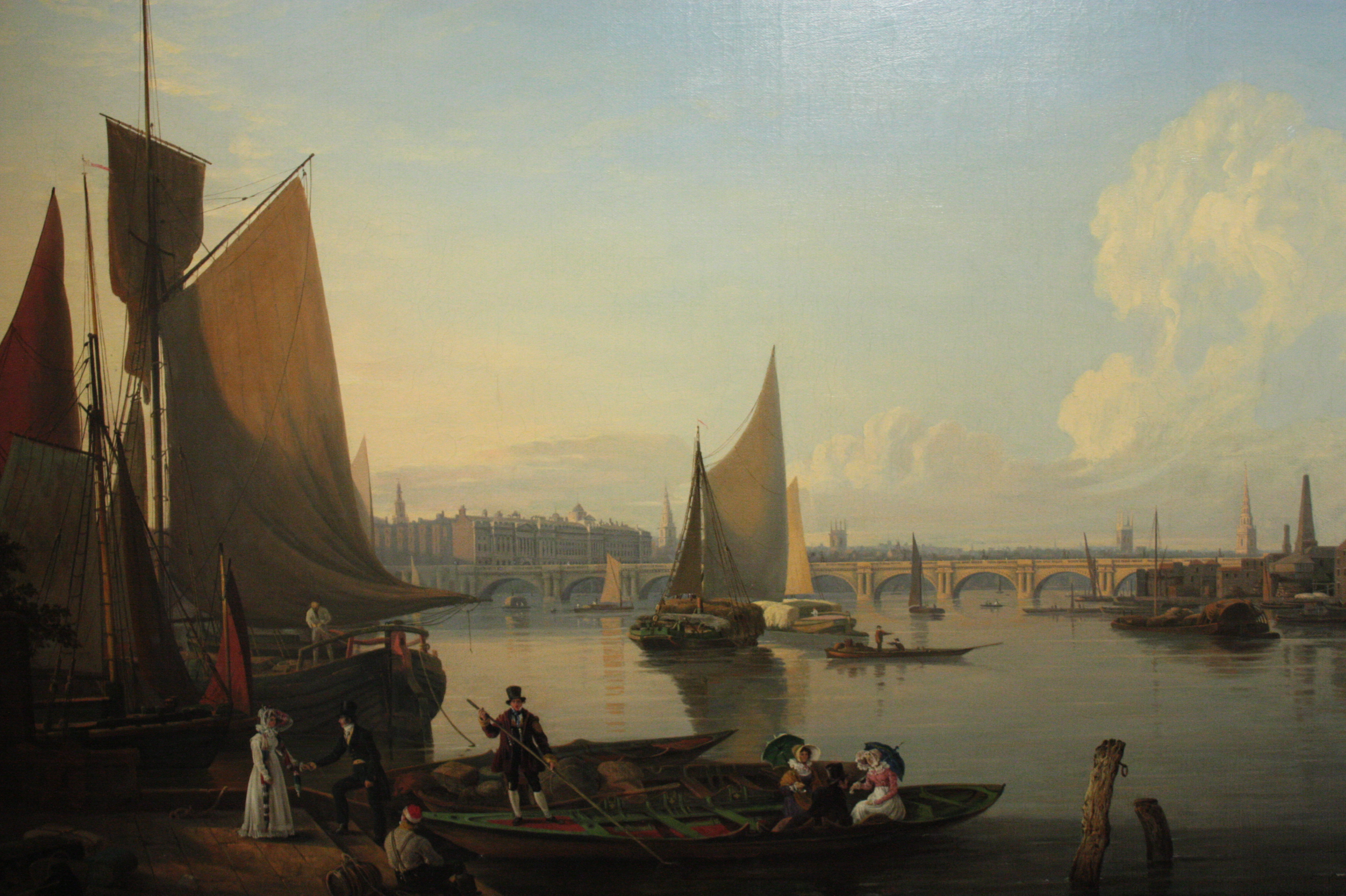
Waterloo Bridge and the Lambeth Waterfront from Westminster Stairs by Charles Deane, 1821

The south end of the bridge is in the area known as the South Bank, which includes the Royal Festival Hall, London Waterloo, Queen Elizabeth Hall and the Royal National Theatre, as well as the BFI Southbank, which is directly beneath the bridge.

The north end of the bridge passes above the Victoria Embankment where the road joins the Strand and Aldwych alongside Somerset House. This end housed the southern portal of the Kingsway Tramway Subway until the late 1950s.

The bridge also connects the Strand Campus area and the Waterloo Campus of King's College London which are located in the north and south banks of River Thames, respectively.

The nearest London Underground station is Temple, the nearest National Rail station is London Waterloo.

== In popular culture ==
- In Arthur Conan Doyle's short story The Five Orange Pips (first published in The Strand Magazine in November 1891), a character falls into the Thames off Waterloo Bridge, which a newspaper notes "should have the effect of calling the attention of the authorities to the condition of the riverside landing-stages".
- Robert E. Sherwood's play Waterloo Bridge (1930), the story of a soldier who falls in love and marries a woman he meets on the bridge in an air raid during the First World War, was made into films released in 1931, 1940 and 1956. The second of these film versions starred Vivien Leigh and Robert Taylor.
- "After the Lunch", a poem by Wendy Cope about two lovers parting on Waterloo Bridge, now forms the lyric of the song "Waterloo Bridge" by Jools Holland and Louise Marshall.
- The bridge features in the film A Window in London (1940). The hero, played by Michael Redgrave, is a crane driver who is working on the construction of the bridge. Images can be seen of the incomplete rebuilding work in progress.
- The bridge features in scenes at the beginning and end of the film Alfie (1966), starring Michael Caine. In the final scene of the film the title character is seen crossing the bridge followed by a stray dog.
- The song "Waterloo Sunset" by the British band The Kinks tells of living in London and watching life from Waterloo Bridge.
- The comedy short "Waterloo Bridge Handicap" (1978) features a fictional daily race by commuters on the Surbiton - Waterloo train to be the first to walk across to the other side of the bridge.
- A scene in "The Great Game", an episode of the BBC television series Sherlock, takes place beneath the bridge's northern side, where members of Sherlock's network of homeless informants congregate.
- The bridge features in the closing scene of the 1996 film Trainspotting.
- The bridge, when still a toll-bridge, and its toll-keeper feature in Dickens's essay 'Down with the Tide' (1853).
- It is featured in the Mario Kart games Mario Kart Tour and Mario Kart 8 Deluxe as part of the London Loop racecourse.

== See also ==
- List of crossings of the River Thames
- List of bridges in London
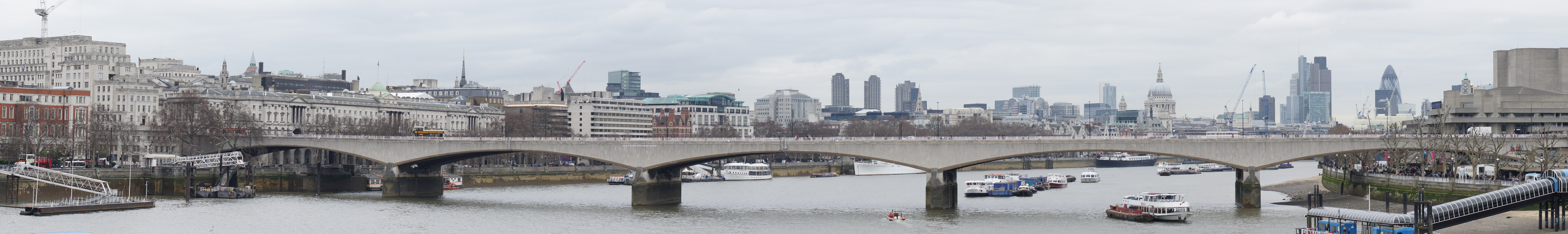
Waterloo Bridge viewed from the Golden Jubilee Bridge
