= Hamstone House =

Large detached house in Surrey, England

- Location within Surrey
- 51°20′41″N 0°27′14″W
- Location: St George's Hill
- OS grid reference: TQ 07787 61753

History
- Built: 1938

Site notes
- Area: Surrey
- Architect: Ian Forbes
- Architectural style: Neo-Georgian
- Owner: Edenfield Investments

Listed Building – Grade II
- Official name: Hamstone House
- Designated: 16 November 1984
- Reference no.: 1030101

Hamstone House is a large detached house on the St George's Hill estate in the English county of Surrey. The house stands in 8 acres of grounds that are bordered by St George's Hill Golf Club.

== History ==
The house was designed in 1938 by Ian Forbes for the building contractor Peter Lind in the Neo-Georgian style, then in vogue.

The house and lodges are built from concrete and faced with honey coloured hamstone, a form of limestone mined in Ham Hill in Somerset. The stone used to build Hamstone House was the last significant supply of the stone before the closure of the Ham Hill quarries for 40 years. Gargoyles bearing the initials of Lind and his wife sit atop the lead pipes of the house.

Christopher Warman, writing in The Times in 1987 wrote that Hamstone House was perhaps "the most important architectural centrepiece of St Georges's Hill...and looks like the bridge of a huge ocean going liner". The house was acquired in 1984 by an owner who spent £2 million on renovations and creating an Art Deco interior. The house was put on sale with Hamptons & Sons for £5 million in 1987 (equivalent to £14,463,195 in 2025). An 8 ft Venetian glass chandelier and Lalique light fittings were specially commissioned for the house.

Richard Durman in his 2006 book Ham Hill: Portrait of a Building Stone describes the style of Hamstone House as "ashlar faced, simple Classical lines, and some good carved details". Ian Nairn, writing in the 1971 Surrey edition of the Pevsner Architectural Guides, described the house as "Neo-Classical with a big gatehouse and suntrap plan". Christopher Matthew described a visit to Hamstone House in his 'Property' column in Punch magazine in July 1987. Matthew wrote that 'even in the midst of the quasi-rural grandur' Hamstone House stands out like the 'Duchess of Windsor's flamingo brooch in a local jewellers window' and the grounds as 'eight acres of tall trees and woodland walks, beds of heathers and a formal rose garden that would not look out of place in the grandest of crematoria'.

The main house has been listed Grade II on the National Heritage List for England since November 1984. In addition to the main house, the entrance lodges and garage are also listed Grade II. The house is curved and has 10 bedrooms. The centre of the paved forecourt in front of the house holds a fountain. An underground air raid shelter at the house was turned into a billiard room in the late 1980s. Elm from the piers of the old Waterloo Bridge was used in the dining room floor at Hamstone House. Peter Lind, who commissioned the house, was the contractor for the new Waterloo Bridge designed by Giles Gilbert Scott, that was built at the same time as the house.

Hamstone House was the subject of the main article in the 13 September 1939 issue of Country Life, which included extensive photographs of the interior and exterior. In 2001, Hamstone House was acquired by the Russian oligarch Oleg Deripaska's company Edenfield Investments. It was for sale with Beauchamp Estates in 2020 for £16 million. It was listed as having 5 bedrooms; 4 en-suite, with 8 acres of grounds.
