= Waterloo Bridge and the Lambeth Waterfront from Westminster Stairs =

Painting by Charles Deane

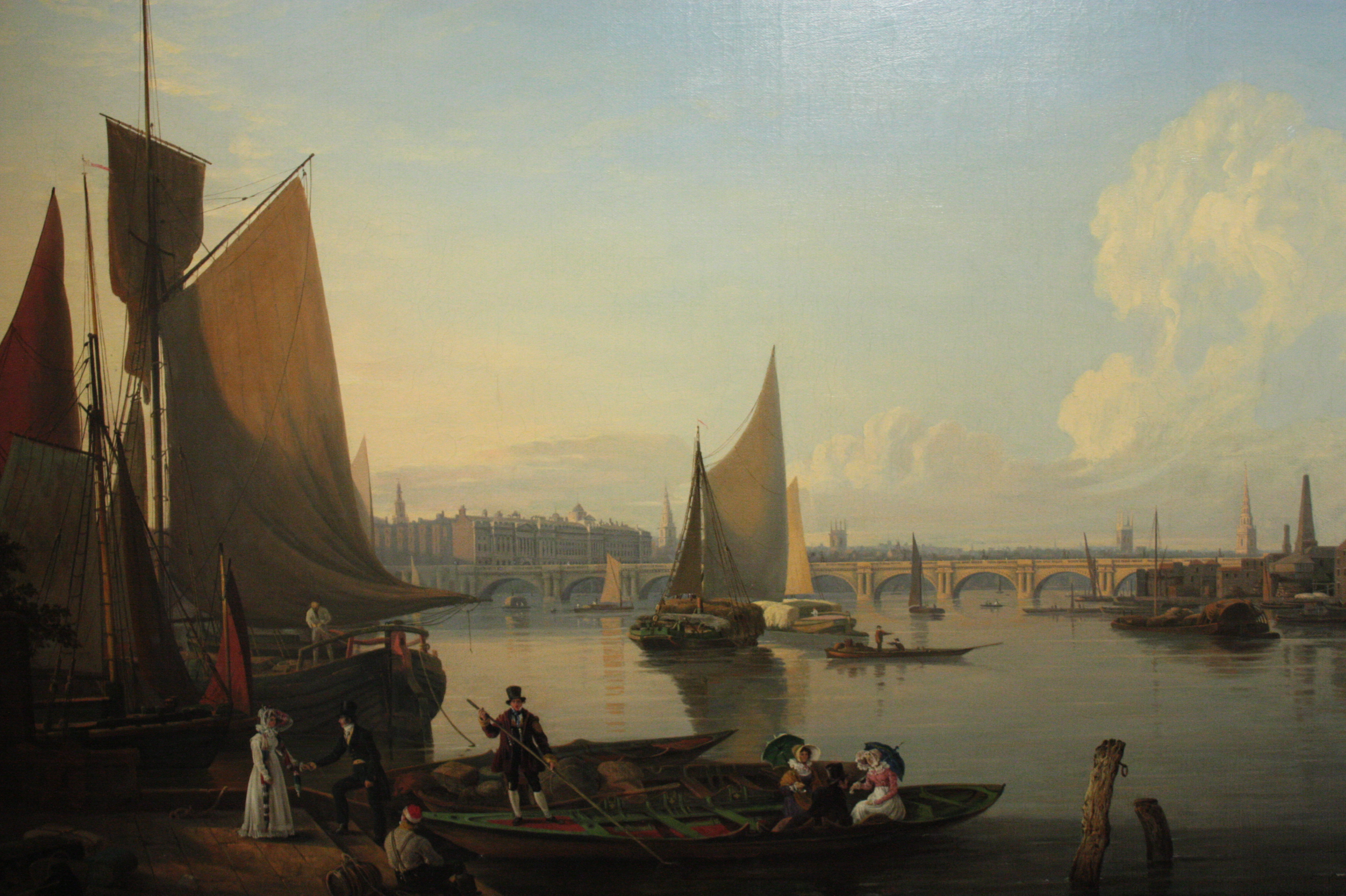
- Artist: Charles Deane
- Year: 1821
- Type: Oil on canvas, landscape painting
- Dimensions: 124 cm × 197.8 cm (49 in × 77.9 in)
- Location: Museum of London; London

Waterloo Bridge and the Lambeth Waterfront from Westminster Stairs is an 1821 landscape painting by the British artist Charles Deane. It depicts a view on the River Thames looking eastwards from Westminster towards Waterloo Bridge. Somerset House can be seen beyond the bridge while on the South Bank are industrial buildings in what was then Lambeth but is now known as Waterloo. The towers of various London churches are visible in the distance. Waterloo Bridge was opened in 1817 and named after the Battle of Waterloo that ended the Napoleonic Wars.

The painting is now in the collection of the Museum of London and on display at the London Museum Docklands near Canary Wharf.

== Bibliography ==
- Galinou, Mireille & Hayes, John. London in Paint: Oil Paintings in the Collection at the Museum of London. The Museum, 1996.
- Reynolds, Luke. Who Owned Waterloo?: Battle, Memory, and Myth in British History, 1815–1852. Oxford University Press, 2022.
- Sheppard, Francis. London 1808-1870: The Infernal Wen. University of California Press, 2023.
- Wright, Christopher, Gordon, Catherine May & Smith, Mary Peskett. British and Irish Paintings in Public Collections: An Index of British and Irish Oil Paintings by Artists Born Before 1870 in Public and Institutional Collections in the United Kingdom and Ireland. Yale University Press, 2006.
