= Palace of Fine and Decorative Arts =

- Palace of Fine and Decorative Arts, Treasure Island
- U.S. National Register of Historic Places
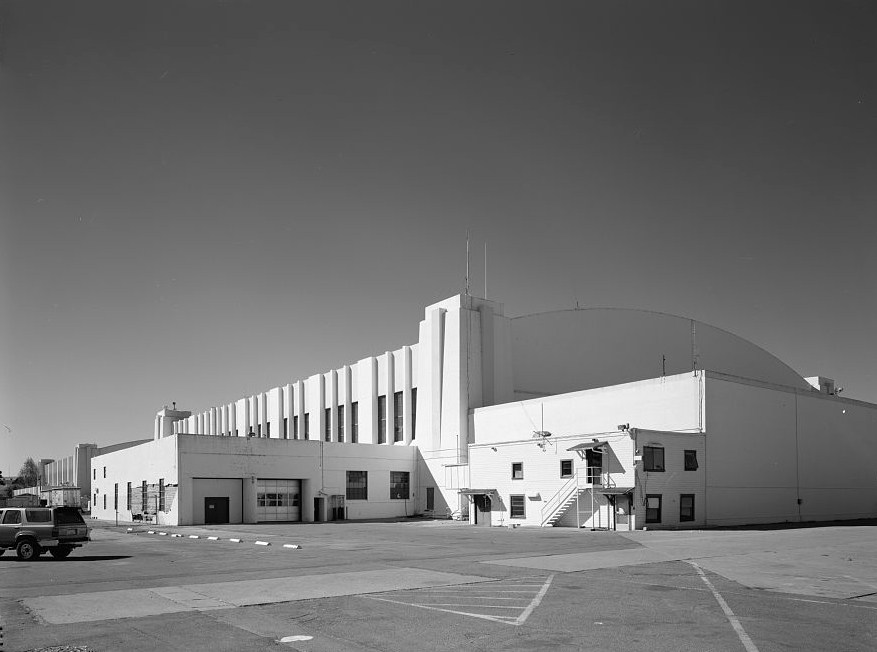
- Rear of the Palace of Fine and Decorative Arts/Building 3 in 2003

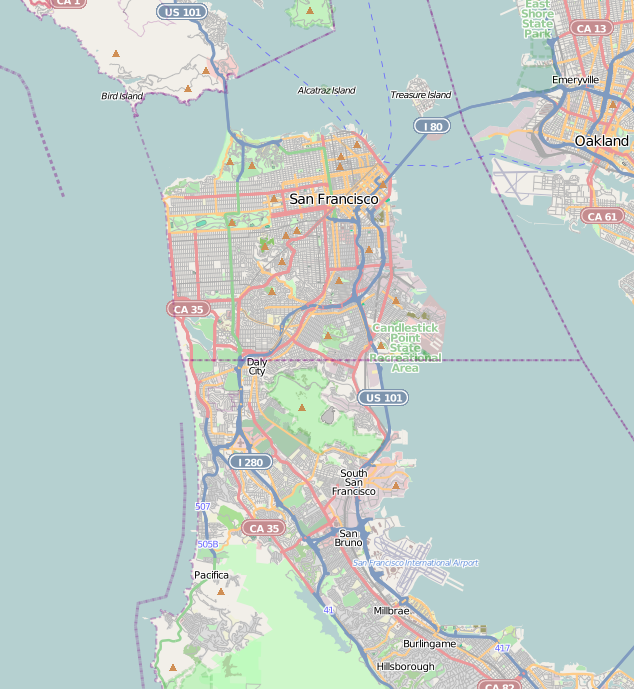
- Location within San Francisco Location within California Location within the United States
- Location: SE Side of California Ave. between Avenue F and Avenue I, Treasure Island, California
- Coordinates: 37°49′9″N 122°21′53″W
- Area: 2 acres (0.81 ha)
- Built: 1938
- Architects: William Peyton Day; George William Kelham
- Architectural style: Moderne
- NRHP reference No.: 08000083
- Added to NRHP: February 26, 2008

The Palace of Fine and Decorative Arts, also known as Building 3, on Treasure Island in San Francisco Bay, California, was an aircraft hangar constructed in 1938 for Pan American World Airways' trans-Pacific Clipper services, and then modified for the 1939-40 Golden Gate International Exposition. Building 3 was one of a pair of identical hangars built to house Pan American's flying boats at the south end of the island. Building 1 was to be the airline's terminal building, and Buildings 2 and 3 would house the aircraft. For the exposition, these buildings were converted to exhibition halls, surrounded by a complex of temporary structures. At the end of the exposition all structures but Buildings 1, 2 and 3 were to be torn down to make way for the development of the reclaimed land as an airport for San Francisco.

== Original structure ==
Buildings 1, 2 and 3 were designed by San Francisco architects George W. Kelham and William Peyton Day. They were designed in the Art Moderne style considered appropriate for an aviation terminal. Initial construction of the buildings as airplane hangars was complete by July 1938. Building 3 was a reinforced concrete structure about 335 feet (102 m) long and 225 feet (69 m) wide, and 80 feet (24 m) tall on a concrete pile foundation. The roof is a three-hinge riveted steel arch. A one-story section, intended to be retained for the hangar, is 40 feet (12 m) wide the length of the southeast side.

== Exhibition hall ==
For use as the Palace of Fine and Decorative Arts a 48,600-square-foot (4,520 m^{2}) one-story addition wraps around the other three sides of Building 3. The addition is constructed of reinforced concrete sprayed with stucco. Four concrete towers each almost 68 feet (21 m) tall are on the corners. A formal entrance faces northwest in a concave indentation with scallops or broad flutes in the surface of the marquee over the door. From the other elevations the structure's heritage as a hangar is visible, with the taller hangar section looming over the additions.

The interior was fitted out for the exposition with curving temporary plaster walls to house a $20 million collection of artwork, designed by Dorothy Wright Liebes and Shepard Vogelsang. The space was extensively subdivided into small galleries.

The 1939 season of the exposition was a failure, with half the visitation expected at only 10 million patrons. The exposition closed two months early, four million dollars in debt. It reopened in 1940. For the 1940 season Diego Rivera painted the Pan Am Unity fresco. The fair closed on September 29, 1940, still in debt.

== Navy use ==
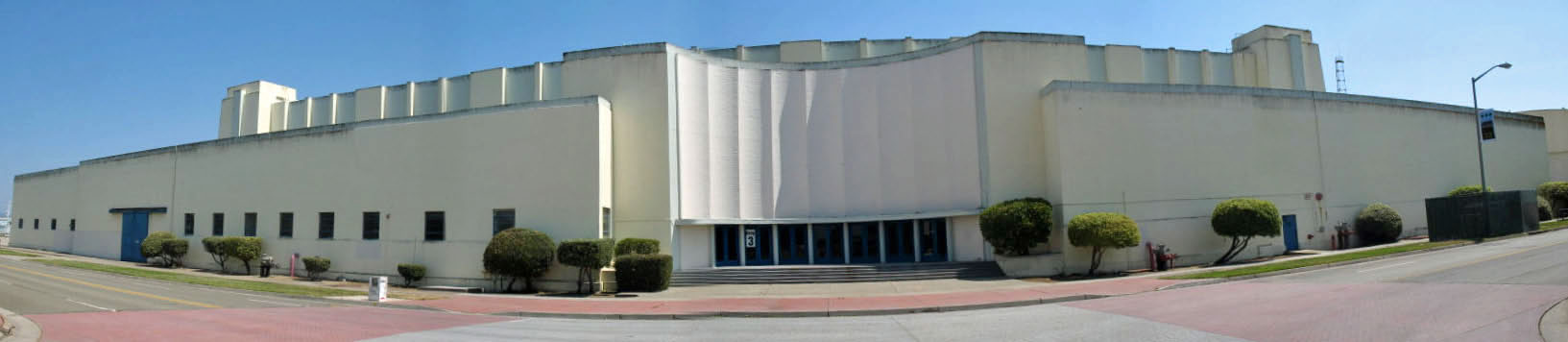
Front elevation of the Palace of Fine and Decorative Arts (Building 3)

Following the fair's closure the U.S. Navy, which already had a station on adjacent Yerba Buena Island, took over Treasure Island as the Naval Training and Distribution Center, Treasure Island. The station trained security forces for merchant ships after the United States' entry into World War II. The Palace of Fine and Decorative Arts became an equipment repair center. The Hall of Transportation (Building 2) reverted to use as a hangar. The Administration Building (Building 1) continued to serve as an administration center. At the end of the war the station became a major separation facility for returning servicemen being mustered out of the armed services. The station was finally closed in 1997.

Building 3 has since been used as a film production location. It was placed on the National Register of Historic Places on February 26, 2008.
