= Wellington Museum =

Museum covering the history of Wellington

Coordinates: 41°17′07″S 174°46′41″E

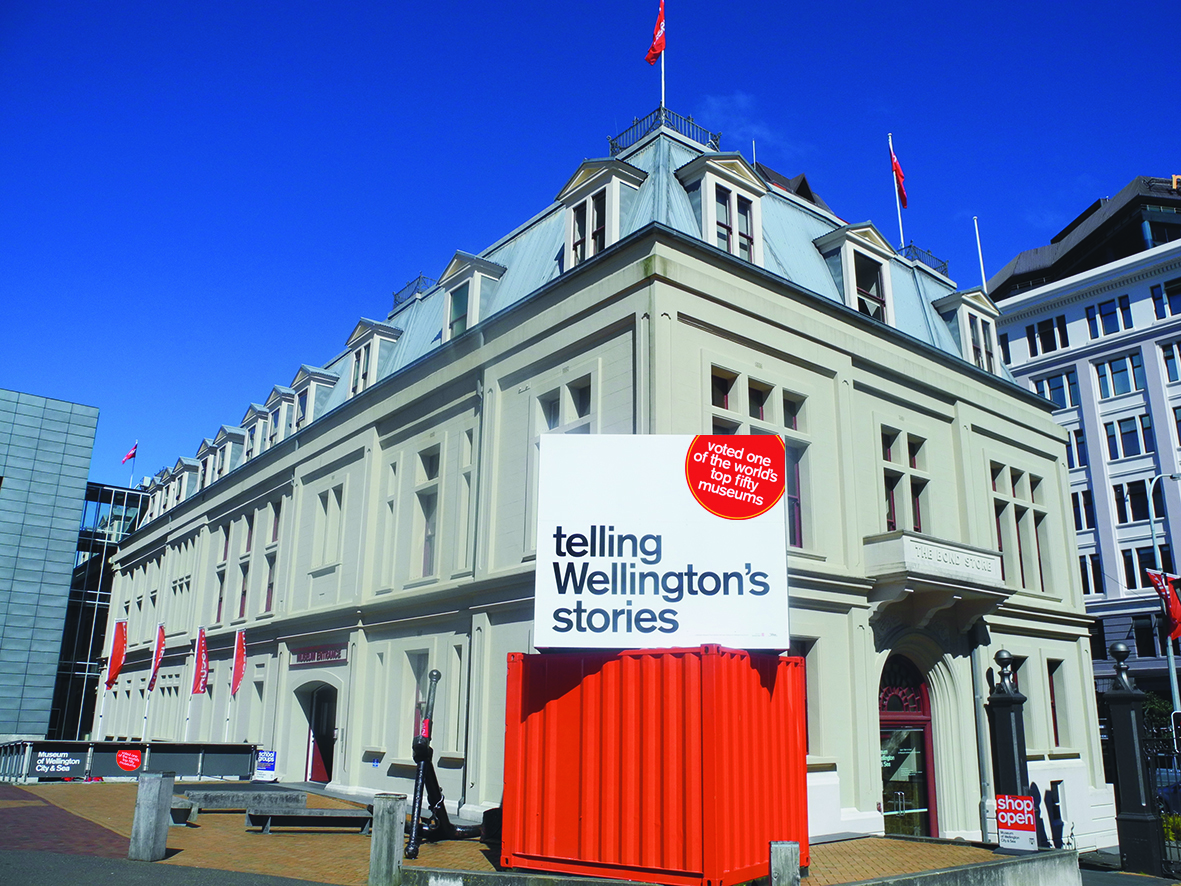
- Wellington Museum in the Wellington Harbour Board Head Office and Bond Store building.
- Former names: The Maritime Museum, Museum of City & Sea
- Established: 1972
- Location: Wellington Harbour Board Head Office and Bond Store,3 Jervois Quay, Queens Wharf, Wellington, New Zealand
- Website: museumswellington.org.nz

Heritage New Zealand – Category 1

Wellington Museum (formerly the Maritime Museum and Museum of City & Sea) is a museum on Queens Wharf in Wellington, New Zealand. It occupies the 1892 Bond Store, a historic building on Jervois Quay on the waterfront of Wellington Harbour. In 2013, it was voted by The Times as one of the world's 50 best museums.

The museum has four floors covering the history of Wellington. Celebrating the city's maritime history, early Māori and European settlement, and the growth of the region, the museum seeks to tell Wellington's stories and how the city has evolved over its 150 years as capital of New Zealand. A giant cinema screen stretching between the ground, first and second floors shows a series of films about Wellington. There are three theatre areas: one tells Māori legends using a Pepper's ghost, another is a memorial to the sinking of the Wahine ferry in Wellington Harbour and the third, located on the top floor, is a 'Wellington Time Machine'. A new exhibition space, The Attic, opened in late 2015 after extensive refurbishment and restoration to the top floor.

New Zealand citizens can get free access to the museum, while international visitors must pay an entry fee. The museum relies on donations from the community to continue to operate.

== Background ==
The museum started in 1972 as the Wellington Maritime Museum of the Wellington Harbour Board.

In 1989, with the reorganisation of local bodies throughout New Zealand, the museum was transferred to the Wellington City Council (WCC) and expanded in scope to include social history of the region. The conversion of this building into the Museum of Wellington City & Sea was completed in 1999, and it became Wellington Museum in July 2015. It is run by Experience Wellington.

== Exhibitions ==
The museum contains various exhibits spread through four floors of the Wellington Harbour Board Head Office and Bond Store building.

=== The Bond Store ===
This exhibit shows the layout of the historic museum building as it was in the late Victorian era, where it was used as a bonded cargo warehouse holding goods.

=== Telling Tales ===
Telling Tales explores the history of Wellington city throughout the 20th century using a collection of artefacts to mark significant events. However, Telling Tales was later changed to another exhibit, Te Whanganui-a-Tara.

=== Maritime Gallery and Wahine Theatre ===
The gallery showcases the nautical history of Wellington. The gallery includes a full scale captain's cabin, and a display commemorating Paddy the Wanderer.

The Wahine Theatre is in memory of the TEV Wahine disaster and includes items salvaged from the wreck as well as a theatre showing a short film by New Zealand filmmaker Gaylene Preston.

=== Von Kohorn Room ===
The Von Kohorn Room was once the boardroom of the Wellington Harbour Board. The Von Kohorn Room is named after Baron Ralph Steven von Kohorn in recognition of his significant contribution to the museum over many years. In 1987, Baron von Kohorn was awarded the Wellington Civic Award for services to the city. He was a driving force behind Wellington's former maritime museum, was on the steering committee and board of the Sports Foundation, now SPARC, was involved in setting up New Zealand Oral History Archives, served as finance chairman for Cot Death Research and was on the board of directors for the Fulbright Foundation for 29 years.
