= Peter Lind & Company =

Private building contractor

- Type: Private
- Industry: Construction
- Founded: 1915
- Headquarters: Spalding, Lincolnshire, England
- Website: www.peterlind.co.uk

Peter Lind & Company is a building contractor with bases in Central London and Spalding in Lincolnshire, England.

== History ==
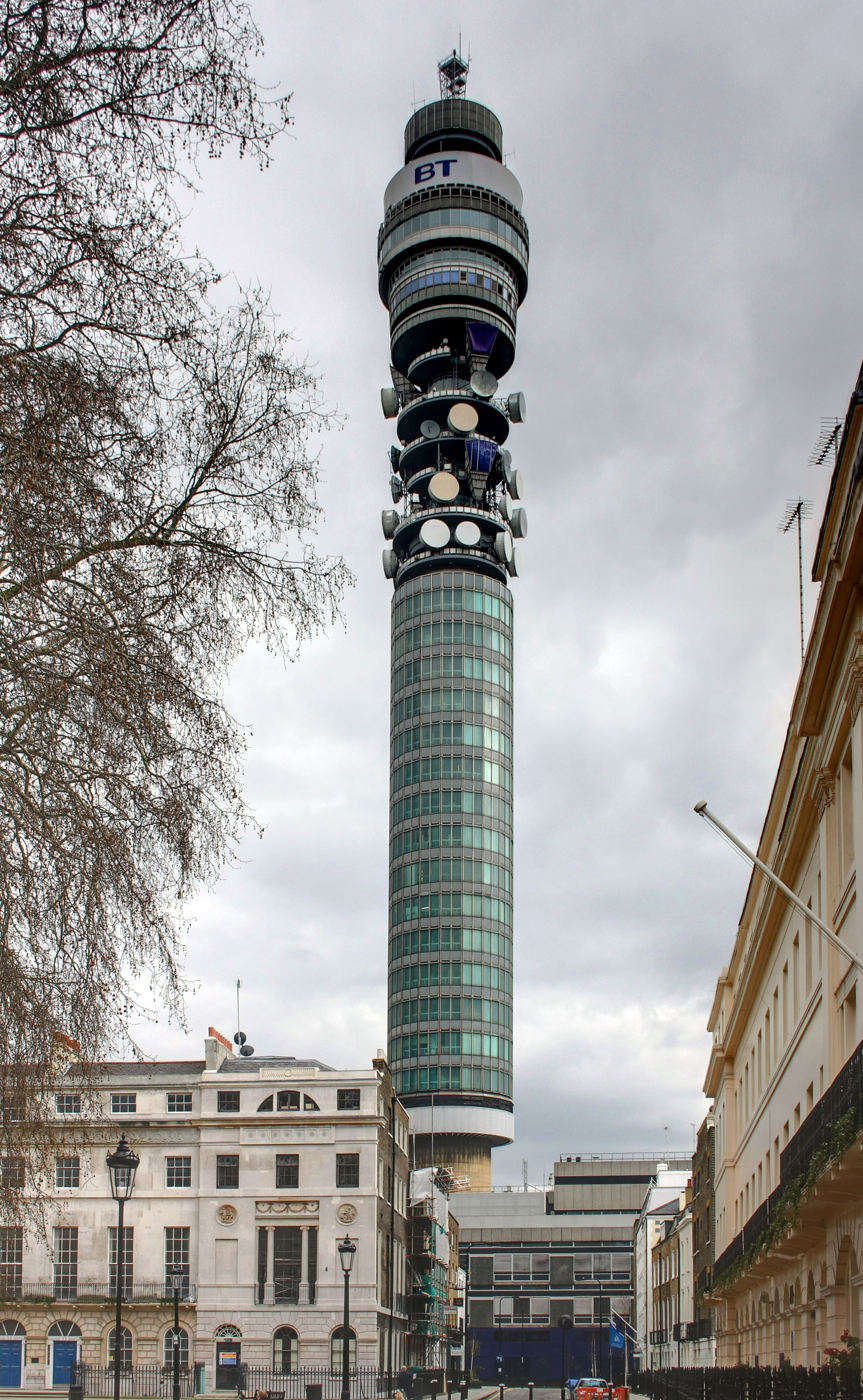
The BT Tower built by Peter Lind

The original company was founded in 1915 by Danish engineer Herman Peter Thygesen Lind (1890–1956). In 1980 the company, following to a failed project in the Mole Valley and a docks lock-out in Merseyside, called in receivers W.H. Cork Gully & Company, which sold off the assets. A group of former employees purchased certain rights and recommenced construction operations.

During the Second World War the company was a significant builder of Mulberry harbour units.

Major construction projects undertaken by the company include Waterloo Bridge in London (completed in 1945) and the BT Tower in London which was completed in 1964 by Peter Lind's son in law Thomas Jaeger.

== Sources ==
- Hartcup, Guy (2011). Code Name Mulberry: The Planning Building and Operation of the Normandy Harbours. Pen & Sword Military. ISBN 978-1848845589.
