= Josephine M. Hagerty House =

Historic house in Massachusetts, United States

- U.S. National Register of Historic Places
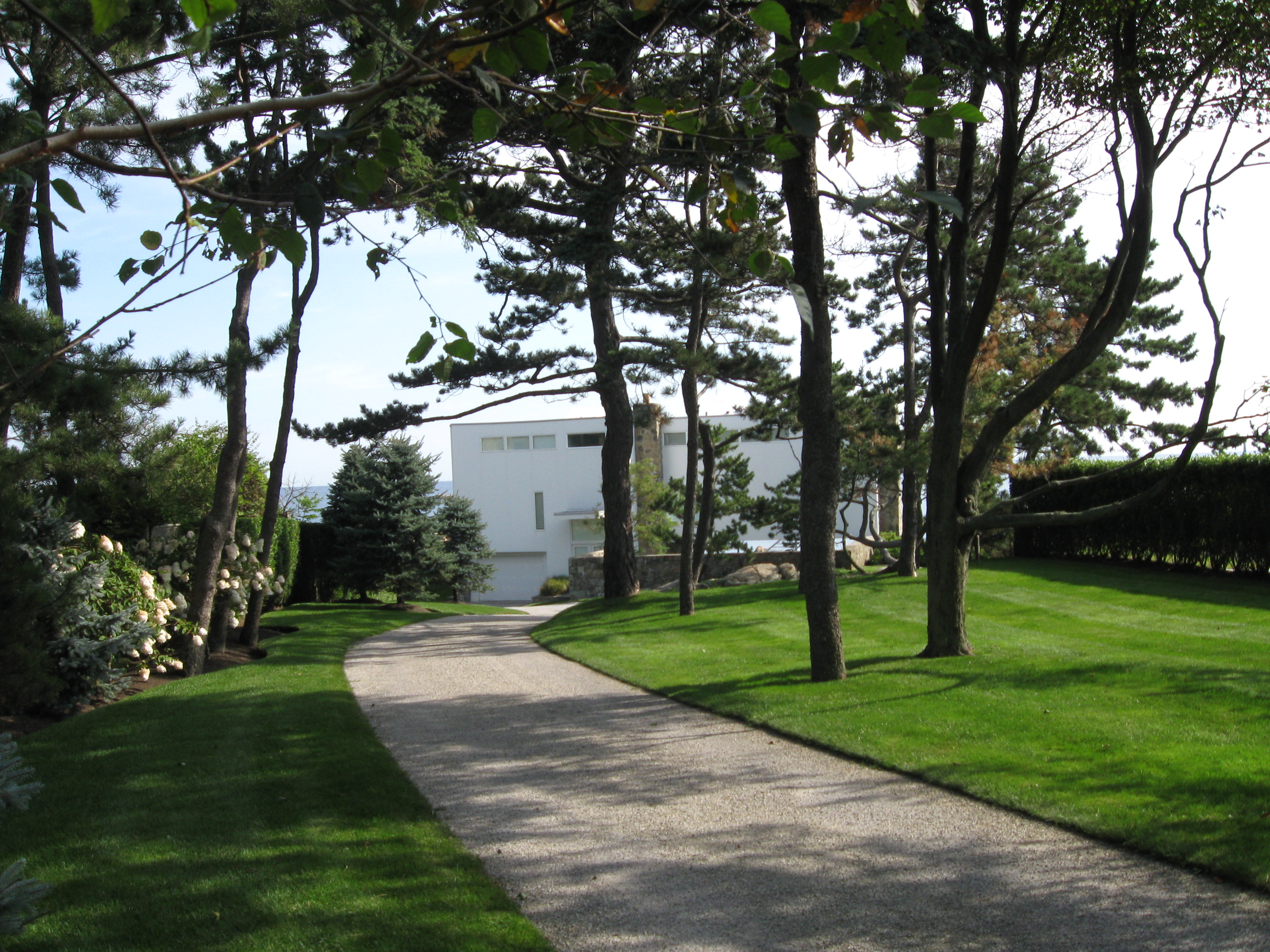

- Location within Massachusetts Location within the United States
- Location: Cohasset, Massachusetts
- Coordinates: 42.2586°N 70.8024°W
- Built: 1938
- Architect: Walter Gropius; Marcel Breuer
- Architectural style: International Style
- NRHP reference No.: 97000529
- Added to NRHP: June 4, 1997

The Josephine M. Hagerty House is an historic house at 357 Atlantic Avenue in Cohasset, Massachusetts, United States. Built in 1938, it was the first building in the U.S. designed by either of its architects: Bauhaus architect Walter Gropius and his partner Marcel Breuer. It is one of the nation's early examples of International Style architecture and is listed on the National Register of Historic Places. The original owners retained the house until 1951, after which it was resold multiple times. Successive owners have modified the architecture, including enclosing a deck.

The Hagerty House is situated on a point of land overlooking Massachusetts Bay on the north shore of Cohasset, west of Sandy Beach. The house sits near the rocky coastline, on a foundation made of locally gathered fieldstone. Parts of the house are supported by lally columns. The house is an L-shaped structure, with a north–south single-story section and a three-story section extending west from one end. The exterior is finished in vertical board siding, interspersed with floor-to-ceiling plate glass windows and bands of windows; farther to the south, a sundeck projects eastward. The building has undergone a number of minor alterations, including window and cement replacement, over the years.

== Site ==
The Josephine M. Hagerty House is located at 357 Atlantic Avenue in Cohasset, Massachusetts, United States. The house sits on the shoreline of a rocky peninsula, occupying a land lot of 33,600 square feet (3,120 m^{2}). The house is about 250 feet (76 m) from Atlantic Avenue; since the land slopes downhill from the street, the house itself is substantially lower than the adjacent avenue. There is a lawn separating the house from the street, and a gravel driveway from Atlantic Avenue down to a garage under the house's northern end. The house comes within 20 feet (6.1 m) to the Atlantic Ocean at its rear, or eastern, end. There is a beach next to the house, occupying a gap in the granite seawall that runs along the shoreline on either side of the house.

== Architecture ==
The house was designed by the partnership of Walter Gropius and Marcel Breuer; Gropius was the original architect, while Breuer joined him later. Although the house is in the International Style, it incorporates elements of naval architecture, such as stilts. Breuer regarded himself as the primary architect, and he had created the final plan based on Gropius's initial drawings.

The design used mass-produced and utilitarian materials, in keeping with the teachings of the Bauhaus school, which Gropius had founded. For example, exterior steel staircases, interior radiators, and exposed terracotta chimney pipes were all left exposed. The materials were acquired off-the-shelf from hardware stores. Breuer had used several elements of the design in previous European commissions such as the Villa Harnischmacher in Germany, as well as Gane Pavilion in England.

=== Exterior ===
The Hagerty House spans three stories, namely the ground level and an elevated first and second story. It has a roughly "L"-shaped massing, with the primary spaces oriented north–south—forming a rectangle of about 66 by 16 feet (20.1 by 4.9 m)—and a three-story wing extending west from the northern end. A double-level sundeck, with pipe railings on both levels and lally columns below, extends east from the first and second floors, facing the ocean. A stair from the sundeck leads down to the beach. Including the sundeck, the floor plan is roughly "Z"-shaped. Due to its cubic and rectangular forms, the Patriot Ledger said in 1987 that the building "fits within the realm of art deco".

The primary massing's first and second floors are raised about 8 feet (2.4 m) from the shore, supported by lally columns and rubblestone walls. The lally columns are round pillars spaced every 12.5 feet (3.8 m) and are primarily located at the southern end of the house, as well as under the double-level sundeck. The building also has a rubblestone base with stones from the local area. Rubblestone walls extend outward from the base, surrounding a 36-by-36-foot (11 by 11 m) garden southwest of the "L". On the first and second stories, the facade consists of white, vertically oriented wooden boards. The windows generally have wooden windowsills and steel frames. Steel decorations, such as railings, are also used for some parts of the facade. The house has a flat roof as well. Each elevation of the facade uses different materials and fenestration, or openings. Except for the fenestration—or arrangement of windows—the building lacks ornamentation.

==== Facade ====
The facade's western elevation was envisioned with little fenestration. It was to have a garage door, a front entrance, and a limited number of asymmetrical openings. The garage is on the ground floor of the three-story western wing, accessed by a wide garage door at the northern end of the western elevation. To the right of the garage door is the entrance. At the top of the staircase is a stair landing with a single rubblestone step to the door. Within the doorway, there is a transom window above and a window to the right of the door. There is also a cantilevered canopy above the stair landing, which protrudes 6 feet (1.8 m) from the facade. Both the doorway and the garage door are recessed about 18 inches (460 mm) from the facade, with unpainted side walls in each recess. To the left of this door, the western elevation has one narrow window at the first story, while to the right is the western elevation of the house's main section, which is recessed. At the corner of the western wing and the main section, there is a stone chimney, with a terracotta cap protruding from the roofline. South (right) of the corner chimney, the western elevation is carried on columns above a ground-level concrete terrace, and the first story has a large window pane and a smaller casement window. On both portions of the second elevation, the second floor has horizontal ribbon windows.

The southern facade of the western wing, between the door and the corner chimney, is windowless. At the south end of the western elevation, a fieldstone wall protrudes from the facade. This wall is continuous with the southern elevation of the house's main section, which lacks windows; a similar fieldstone wall was used at Gropius and Breuer's earlier Marcel Breuer House I and later Virgil Abele House. The western half of the main section's southern elevation has a protruding fieldstone chimney that rises above the roof; the base of the chimney has a yellow brick-and-stone fireplace. The rest of this elevation has a fieldstone wall on the ground and first floor with wood planks above.

The eastern elevation has a glass wall on its first and second stories, above the lally columns and rubblestone base. The south portion of the eastern elevation's first story has floor-to-ceiling windows and a door leading to the first-floor porch. The rest of the eastern elevation has tripartite windows, along with a door on the second floor, leading to the upper deck. A pair of dormers protrudes from the roof, illuminating two bathrooms on the second floor. At the northeastern corner is a service entrance, leading to the kitchen and laundry room. The service entrance consists of cantilevered steel stairs with pipe railings, which ascend to a landing with a cantilevered canopy similar to the main door. The rest of the northern elevation has a stone basement, with a vertical-plank facade on the first and second stories. There are tripartite windows on both floors just west (right) of the service entrance.

=== Interior ===
The Hagerty House uses a hybrid of steel and wood in its superstructure, including lightweight timber. The interior has a simple, International-style design, with minimalist materials. Oak and white pine are used throughout the house, and the doors have hollow cores. The floors in these spaces are made mostly of oak, which are covered in carpeting. The walls and ceilings are primarily made of plaster, except for baseboards made of wood. The architects mostly left the radiators exposed to show off their function, although the spaces under the living room windows do have radiator covers. The primary spaces in the house are on the first and second floors. The basement was divided into a furnace room, garage, laundry, and dressing room, though the latter three rooms have since been combined.

==== First floor ====
The main entrance in the western wing leads directly into a stair hall. The bottom of the stair has a raised stone landing, above which is a staircase with oak treads cantilevered from a vertical-board wall, along with a truss on the opposite side of the treads. A steel-pipe support structure runs under the treads. When the house was built, the stair also included a fresco by John Hagerty's acquaintance Alfonso A. Ossorio, which depicted St. Francis of Assisi, but this has since been painted over. The staircase's ceiling is about 25 feet (7.6 m) above the first story.

As built, the rest of the first floor is divided into two sections. The living–dining room is located in the elongated south portion, and functional spaces (the kitchen, pantry, maid's room, and study) are situated in the squarish north portion. The living–dining room is variously cited as measuring 15 by 40 feet (4.6 by 12.2 m) or 16 by 36 feet (4.9 by 11.0 m) across. This room has a 36-foot-wide (11 m) glass wall facing east toward the ocean, with two 12-foot-wide (3.7 m) windows and a pair of 6-foot-wide (1.8 m) sliding glass doors. The stone wall to the south has a fireplace embedded into it. Several rooms in the northern portion of the first floor have been combined to create a large eat-in kitchen. The kitchen has a tile floor, in contrast to the carpeted floors used elsewhere in the house. The rooms were originally furnished with some objects designed by Breuer, such as chairs and a bookshelf.

==== Second floor ====
On the second floor, the original bedrooms are oriented on the eastern side of the house in a straight line. There were originally five bedrooms measuring about 9 by 12 feet (2.7 by 3.7 m) across, though the two southernmost bedrooms have been combined. The original southernmost bedroom was a master bedroom with its own door onto the upper deck. The bedrooms have wood floors and were originally sparsely furnished with only a desk and bed. Each room has closets with built-in closets, along with hollow-wood doors with metal transom panels. As built, the western wall of each room was painted in a bright color (since repainted off-white), while the other walls were all painted white. These rooms are connected by a hallway on the west side, illuminated by the ribbon windows outside.

There are also two bathrooms and two sets of en-suite bathrooms, each located between a pair of bedrooms. Each bathroom has white tiles, a combination tub–shower, and a radiator, and is illuminated by monitor windows on the ceiling. The northwestern corner originally had an open-air terrace, later converted to another bedroom.

== History ==
=== Development ===
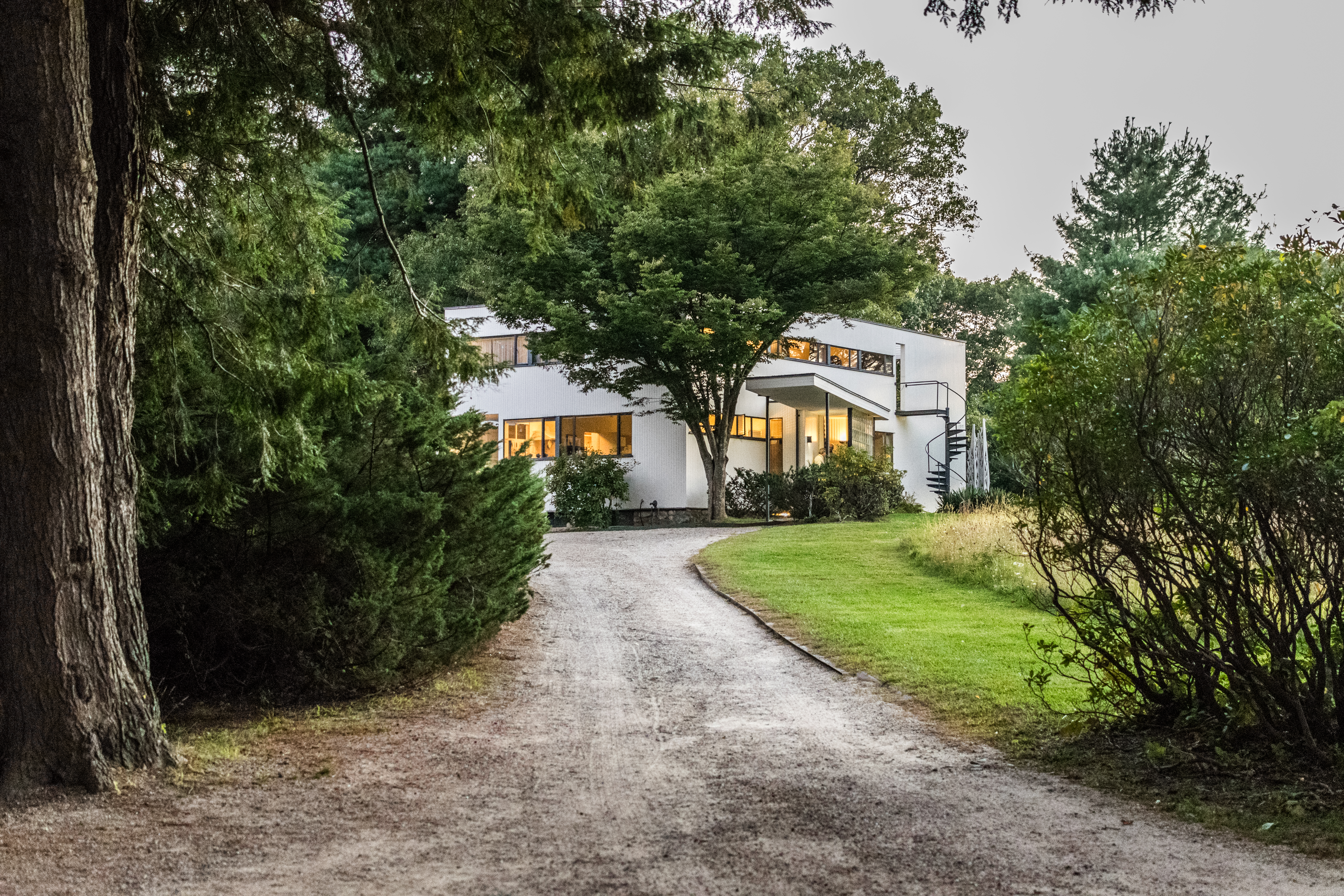
The Hagerty House was Gropius's second-ever design in the U.S., after the Gropius House (pictured) in Lincoln, Massachusetts.

In 1937, the family of Walter Gropius moved to the United States after Gropius accepted a job offer from the Graduate School of Design at Harvard University in Cambridge, Massachusetts. That year, Gropius's Bauhaus colleague Marcel Breuer followed, immigrating to the U.S. from Germany. Gropius and Breuer had formed an architectural partnership soon after both men immigrated to the U.S. At the time, the Great Depression had so drastically reduced demand for new houses that Gropius and Breuer were unable to design any other houses than the Hagerty House and three residences at Woods End Road. The house was commissioned for Josephine Hagerty and her three sons. One of the sons, John Hagerty, was a student at the Harvard Graduate School of Design, attending some of Gropius's courses; he had been inspired to hire Gropius after seeing one of the architect's lectures. After John invited Gropius to the Hagerty family's resident for dinner, Josephine offered to hire Gropius, who enthusiastically accepted the offer. The Patriot Ledger wrote that Josephine Hagerty had thus "veered from her proper Bostonian path".

The Hagerty House would become the first building that either Gropius or Breuer designed for an American client. It was Gropius's second-ever design in the U.S.; the first had been his own house at the Woods End Road subdivision in Lincoln, Massachusetts. The Hagerty House was also Breuer's first American commission where he was significantly involved in the design; he had previously worked on the Gropius House, albeit in a limited capacity. After hiring Gropius, Josephine acquired a temporary residence in Cohasset, and the family bought 1.75 acres (0.71 ha) from the Henry Kincaide estate in 1937, on which their new house was to be built. Breuer was hired to assist in the construction. Elements of Gropius's original plans, including a separate stair tower, were removed when Breuer revised the design.

John had originally planned the building as a summer vacation home, but midway through, the Hagerty family decided to live there year-round. This required retrofitting the house with a heating system. Construction was delayed because of various disputes between those involved in the construction. Gropius and Breuer, being recent immigrants, were unaware that the windows facing the ocean would be subjected to heavy winds. Josephine also claimed that the design had failed to take her needs into account, writing to Gropius and Breuer that "you insisted on your own preconceived ideas without considering their adaptability to the existing conditions or the likes and dislikes of your client". In a 1948 article for Architectural Digest magazine, John also criticized the house's vulnerability to weather.

=== Hagerty use ===
The house was completed by 1939 and was initially controversial. The Hagerty family themselves found various pragmatic issues with the design. For example, the first-floor windows were placed too high up, since their height was dictated by the position of the kitchen sink. The windows themselves were subjected to heavy winds, drawing complaints from the Hagerty family, and necessitated replacement within the house's first decade. Half the windows could no longer be opened within a year of the Hagerty family's moving in. Since the house faced the ocean, the family had to obtain blackout curtains during World War II to prevent German U-boats from seeing them. The house also had to be repainted and replastered annually.

Despite the issues, the Hagerty family appreciated the house. The family often invited curious passersby to take a look, and John himself wrote that "it was our pride and joy and we loved it dearly". Francis moved out with his wife in the 1940s, living in an adjacent house. Sometime in the 1940s, the family considered moving out of the Hagerty House, but they decided to stay and fix the issues after a would-be buyer failed to finalize their acquisition.

=== Later use ===
After Josephine died in 1950, some of the subsequent owners used the house only as an investment or showcase, rather than a residence. The first such owner, the family of Vincent Roberts, bought the house from the Hagerty family in 1951. The Roberts family lived in the house for a year, removing the furnishings before selling it to the Klonower family. The Leff family bought the house in 1959 before reselling it to the Harkness family in 1960. The Harkness family commissioned Breuer to replicate parts of the original design, including the furniture, and converted the western wing's second-story deck to a bedroom.

Richard Anderson acquired the house in 1971 and held onto it for more than two decades. Anderson furnished the house with minimalist furniture, in keeping with the original design intention. Anderson later said he had bought the building because "I liked the location and the simplicity of the house, and because I like the use of stone in the house". During this time, the house was damaged in 1978 and 1992 due to storms, necessitating the replacement of windows. The house's roof also experienced leaks, and the basement was sometimes flooded, requiring Anderson to replace furniture. Anderson initially gave tours of his house, but was no longer doing so by the 1990s. In the late 1980s, the building was nominated for inclusion on the National Register of Historic Places (NRHP) by the Cohasset Historical Society, which described it as a pioneering work of Gropius's. The house was added to the NRHP in 1997.

The Hagerty House was sold in 2001 to Jan Sasseen, who had been interested in a neighboring house. Sasseen's children had asked why she wanted to "buy a house next to that awful place", referring to the Hagerty House, but she decided to look at the Hagerty House after failing to acquire the house she originally wanted. In the 21st century, the house remained a private residence and was closed to the public, although it occasionally hosted tours; Sasseen sometimes opened her house to architecture students.

== Impact and legacy ==
When the Hagerty House was completed, its style contrasted so drastically from the area's traditional architecture, which included Shingle style, Greek Revival, and Federal buildings. As such, the house initially drew consternation from neighbors. A next-door neighbor reportedly sold their own residence in response to the Hagerty House's completion, and John Hagerty's friends compared it to a packing crate and Alcatraz Federal Penitentiary. One writer said the juxtaposition of stone and wood structures was "a collage unimaginable in the Dessau Bauhaus", where both Gropius and Breuer had worked. When the house was added to the NRHP, neighbors still disagreed on its esthetics. Elements of the Hagerty House's design may have influenced other structures such as the Oser House designed by Louis Kahn in Elkins Park, Pennsylvania, in 1940.

== See also ==
- List of Marcel Breuer works
- National Register of Historic Places listings in Norfolk County, Massachusetts

== Sources ==
- Conry, Jaci (January 2009). "Walter Gropius Hagerty House". Dwell. Dwell, LLC.
- Fitch, James Marston (1960). Walter Gropius. G. Braziller. ISBN 978-0-8076-0130-3.
- Gatje, Robert F. (2000). Marcel Breuer : a memoir. Monacelli Press. ISBN 978-1-58093-029-1.
- Giedion, Sigfried (1992). Walter Gropius. Dover Publications. ISBN 978-0-486-27118-7.
- Historic Structures Report: Hagerty House (PDF) (Report). National Register of Historic Places, National Park Service. June 4, 1997.
- Hyman, Isabelle (2001). Marcel Breuer, Architect: The Career and the Buildings. Harry N. Abrams. ISBN 978-0-8109-4265-3.
- Isaacs, Reginald R. (1991). Gropius : an illustrated biography of the creator of the Bauhaus. Little, Brown. ISBN 978-0-8212-1753-5.
- McCarter, Robert (2024). Breuer. Phaidon. ISBN 978-1-83866-947-8.
