= German New Zealanders =

People

German New Zealanders Deutsch-Neuseeländer
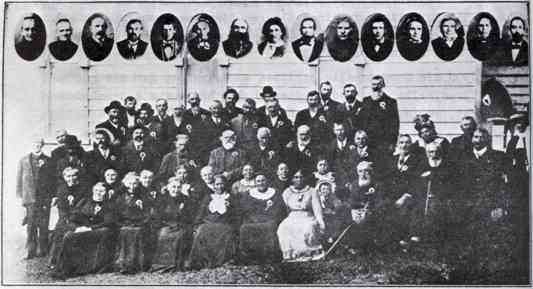
- The German settlers of Puhoi, 1863. They came from Stod (Staab) in Bohemia, in the modern-day Czech Republic.

Total population
- German; 16,818 Immigrants (2018)plus an estimated 200,000 of German descent

Regions with significant populations
- Auckland, Manawatū-Whanganui, Tasman District, Bay of Plenty, Greater Wellington, Te Tai Poutini

Languages
- New Zealand English, Māori, German

Religion
- Predominantly Lutheranism and Roman Catholicism, Judaism

Related ethnic groups
- Germans, German Australians, German Americans, German Canadians, French Germans, British Germans

German New Zealanders (German: Deutsch-Neuseeländer; Māori: Tāngata Aremania o Aotearoa) (Note: Various Māori words for Germany include Tiamana, Hāmene, Aremania, Hamani, and Tiamani. All are transliterations of the English exonym except for Aremania (an earlier adaption of the French Allemagne)) are New Zealand residents of ethnic German ancestry. They comprise a very large amount of New Zealanders in terms of heritage, with some 200,000 people from the country having at least partial German ancestry (approximately 5% of the population from an estimate in the 2000s). New Zealand's community of ethnic German immigrants constitute one of the largest recent European migrant groups in New Zealand, numbering 12,810 in the 2013 census. 36,642 New Zealanders spoke the German language at the 2013 census, making German the seventh-most-spoken language in New Zealand.

Germans first began immigrating to New Zealand in the 1840s. Between 1843 and 1914 around 10,000 arrived, mainly from northern Germany, but also from Prussia, the Sudetenland and Bohemia. One of the first ethnic Germans to explore New Zealand was the mercenary Gustavus von Tempsky, who was killed in armed conflict during the New Zealand Wars. From the 1840s to the 1860s, German immigrants established several rural communities. Ranzau (now Hope) was one of several ethnic German settlements in the Tasman, where settlers planted orchards and vineyards. Puhoi, built by Bohemian Germans, was a settlement north of Auckland on the boundary with the Dalmatian settlement of Dargaville, with whom Germans competed for the kauri gum trade.

Relationships with Germany were stained twice in the twentieth century, during both world wars and the New Zealand conquest of German Samoa. Today, New Zealand and Germany have a strong relationship, and there is frequent movement of people between each country for work, immigration and tourism. Many German immigrants, who today are mostly present in Wellington and Auckland, hold traditional Christmas markets and language classes, as well as Oktoberfests.

== Demography ==
The 2013 census counted 12,810 New Zealand residents who had ancestry from Germany. This number does not include people of German ancestry who selected their ancestry as simply "New Zealander". Today the number of New Zealanders with German ancestry is estimated to be approximately 200,000 (5% of the population). Many German New Zealanders anglicized their names during the 20th century due to the negative perception of Germans fostered by World War I and World War II.

There were 16,818 people identifying as being part of the German ethnic group at the 2018 New Zealand census, making up 0.36% of New Zealand's population. This is an increase of 4,008 people (31.3%) since the 2013 census, and an increase of 5,901 people (54.1%) since the 2006 census. Some of the increase between the 2013 and 2018 census was due to Statistics New Zealand adding ethnicity data from other sources (previous censuses, administrative data, and imputation) to the 2018 census data to reduce the number of non-responses.

There were 7,125 males and 9,693 females, giving a sex ratio of 0.735 males per female. The median age was 33.0 years, compared to 37.4 years for New Zealand as a whole; 3,273 people (19.5%) were aged under 15 years, 4,209 (25.0%) were 15 to 29, 8,067 (48.0%) were 30 to 64, and 1,269 (8.5%) were 65 or older.

== Tourism ==
New Zealand has long been a popular destination for German backpacker tourists and students.

== German New Zealand culture ==
The Goethe-Institut is active in New Zealand and there is a branch in Wellington.

== Notable New Zealanders of German heritage ==
- Michala Banas (born 1978), actress and singer
- Morton Coutts (1904–2004), inventor
- Russell Crowe (born 1964), actor
- Christian Cullen (born 1976), rugby union footballer
- Kim Dotcom (born 1974), internet entrepreneur, businessman, musician, and political party founder
- Maria Dronke (1904–1987) actor, drama producer and teacher
- Thomas Eichelbaum (1931–2018), 11th Chief Justice of New Zealand
- Willi Fels (1858–1946), merchant, collector and philanthropist
- Carl Fischer (died 1893), doctor, homeopath and viticulturist
- Karl Fritsch (born 1963) contemporary jeweller
- Richard Fuchs (1887–1947), composer and architect
- Rudolf Gopas (1913–1983) artist and art teacher
- Awen Guttenbeil (born 1976), rugby league footballer
- Julius von Haast (1822–1887), geologist and founder of Canterbury Museum
- Bendix Hallenstein (1835–1905) merchant, statesman, manufacturer, member of the New Zealand Parliament
- Olli Harder (born 1986), football coach
- Lewis Hotop (c. 1844–1922), pharmacist, politician and Arbor Day advocate
- Gerhard Husheer (1864–1954), tobacco grower and processor, industrialist, philanthropist
- Howard Kippenberger (1897–1957), major general
- Charles Kelling (1818–1898), emigration agent, farmer and community leader
- Fedor Kelling (1820–1909), member of the New Zealand Parliament; brother of Charles Kelling
- Sandro Kopp (born 1978), visual artist currently based in Scotland
- Josh Kronfeld (born 1971), TV presenter and rugby union footballer
- Frederick Augustus Krull (abt 1836–1914), businessman and German consul
- David Lange (1942–2005), 32nd Prime Minister of New Zealand
- Peter Munz (1921–2006), philosopher and historian
- Oscar Natzka (1912–1951), operatic singer
- Arnold Nordmeyer (1901–1989), member of the New Zealand Parliament
- William Ott (1872–1951), 28th Mayor of Invercargill
- Eve Poole (1924–1992), 41st Mayor of Invercargill
- Victoria Schmidt, actress
- Gustavus von Tempsky (1828–1868), adventurer and soldier
- Karl Urban (born 1972), actor
- George William von Zedlitz (1871–1949), Professor of Modern Languages at Victoria University of Wellington (then called Victoria College)
- Johan Wohlers (1811–1885), Lutheran missionary

== See also ==
- European New Zealanders
- Europeans in Oceania
- Forty-Eighters
- German Australians
- Germany–New Zealand relations
- History of the Lutheran Church of Australia and New Zealand
- Immigration to New Zealand
- Lutheran Church of Australia and New Zealand
- Pākehā
