= 1932 Birthday Honours (New Zealand) =

Awards list for New Zealand

The 1932 King's Birthday Honours in New Zealand, celebrating the official birthday of King George V, were appointments made by the King to various orders and honours to reward and highlight good works by New Zealanders. They were announced on 3 June 1932.

The recipients of honours are displayed here as they were styled before their new honour.

== Knight Bachelor ==
- Albert Cecil Day CMG CBE – official secretary to the governor-general since 1913.
- William Duffus Hunt – of Wellington. For public services.
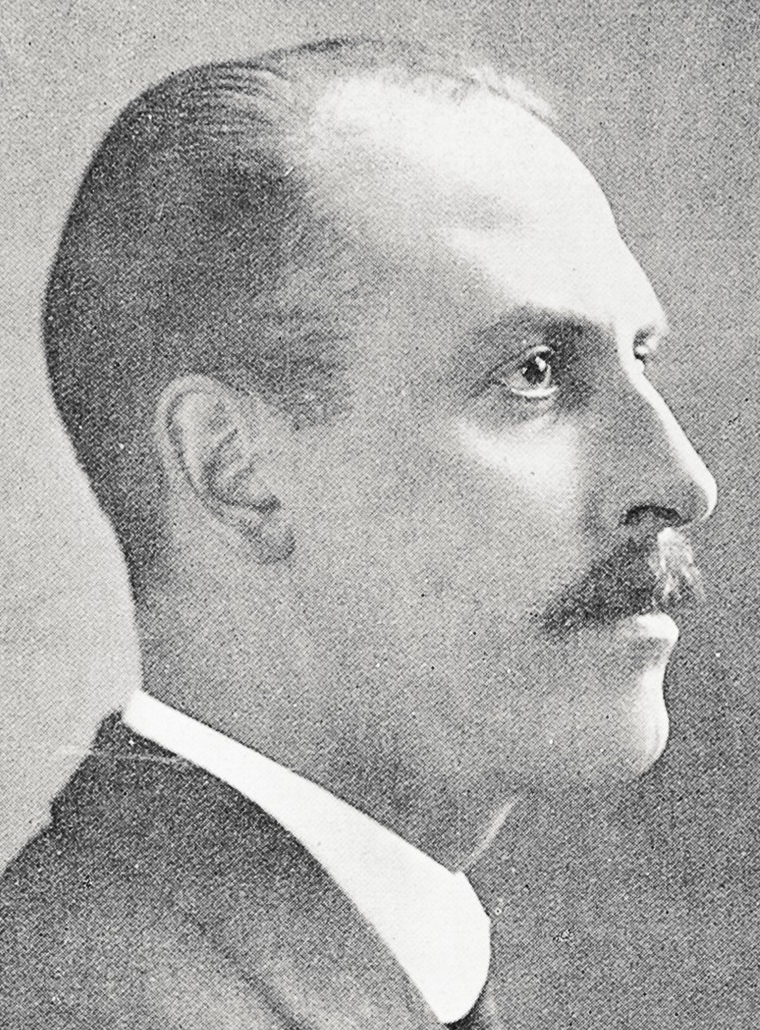
Sir Cecil Day

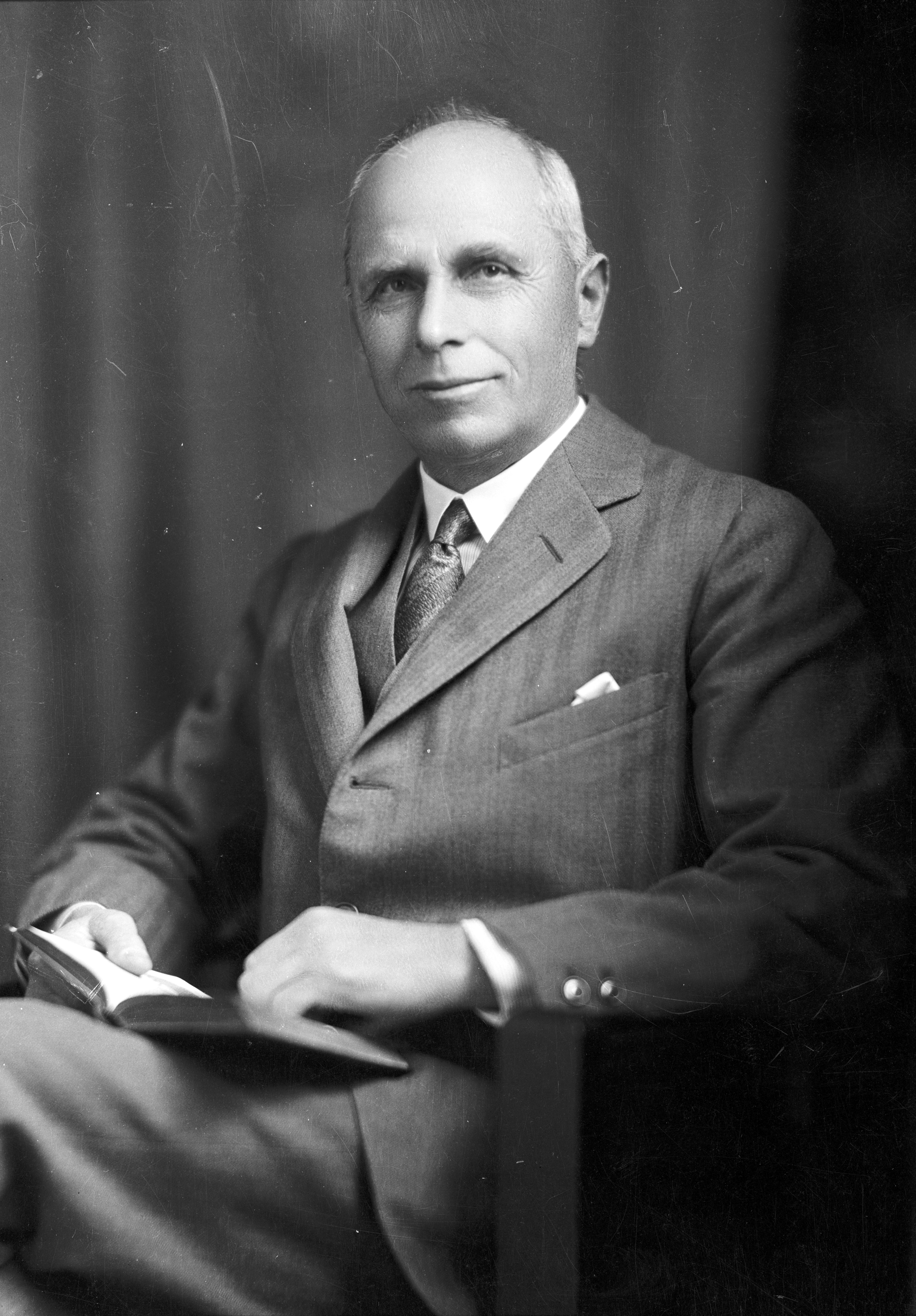
Sir William Hunt

== Order of Saint Michael and Saint George ==
=== Companion (CMG) ===
- Professor James Hight MA LittD – rector of Canterbury University College, Christchurch.
- Alexander Dallas Park – secretary to the Treasury.
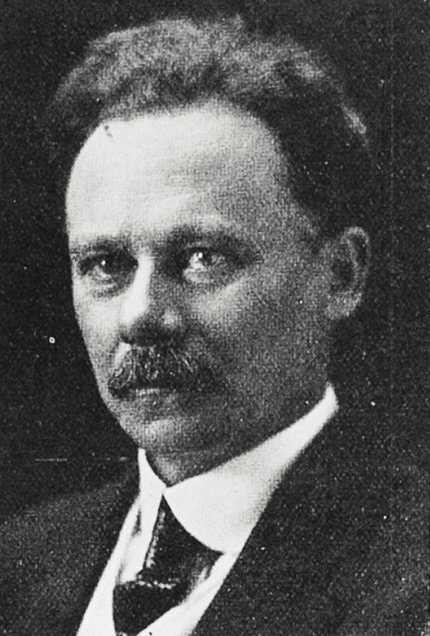
James Hight

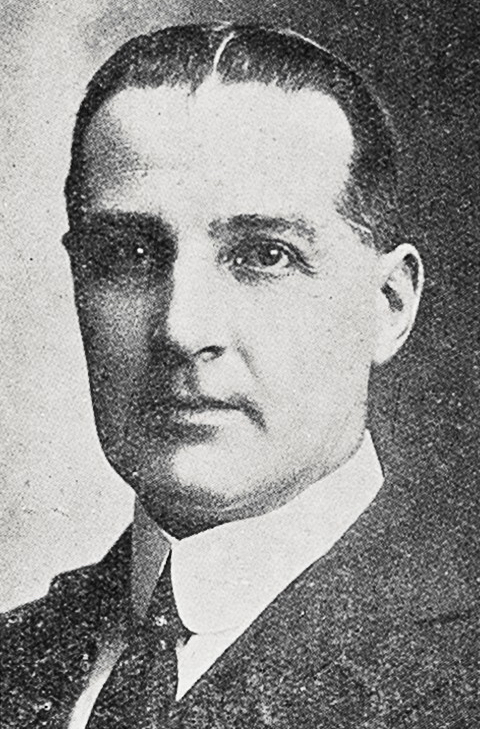
Alexander Park

== Order of the British Empire ==
=== Commander (CBE) ===
- George McNamara – secretary, Post and Telegraph Department.
