= New Zealand Meat Board =

Meat industry body in New Zealand

The New Zealand Meat Board is a statutory body which provides quota management on behalf of the Crown for meat exports to the United States, European Union and United Kingdom. To protect their own livestock industry these countries give limited access to New Zealand meat exports.

It also manages the Board's inherited financial reserves, which are ultimately owned by New Zealand's livestock farmers, for the benefit of industry projects.

Beef + Lamb New Zealand provides functions that benefit the industry.

== Current responsibilities ==
=== Quotas ===
To protect their own meat industry U.S. EU and U.K. control the volume and prices of their meat imports from New Zealand. The Board allocates, monitors and manages access to these markets:

United States
New Zealand is currently permitted to send up to 213,402 tonnes of beef and veal a year to the United States at a tariff rate of US4.4cents per kilogram. Any imports above that quota are subject to a higher tariff rate. Each calendar year the Board uses a (published) quota allocation system to allocate quota within New Zealand beef and veal exporters. The system provides for new entrants.

European Union
Sheepmeat and goatmeat. New Zealand is currently permitted to send up to 114,184 tonnes of sheepmeat and goatmeat a year to the European Union at zero duty. Any imports above that quota are subject to a higher tariff rate. There is a quota allocation system matching that for exports to the United States.

High quality beef. New Zealand is currently permitted to send 846 tonnes of high quality beef a year to the European Union at a 20 per cent duty. The EU's "most favoured nation" global quota (the quota is administered by the EU) allows New Zealand to compete with other nations for a further 116,703 tonnes of frozen beef subject to the same duty. There is a quota allocation system matching that for exports to the United States.

United Kingdom
Sheepmeat and goatmeat. New Zealand is currently permitted to send up to 114,205 tonnes of sheepmeat and goatmeat a year to the United Kingdom at zero duty. Any imports above that quota are subject to a higher tariff rate. There is a quota allocation system matching that for exports to the United States.

High quality beef. New Zealand is currently permitted to send 454 tonnes of high quality beef a year to the United Kingdom at a 20 per cent duty. Any imports above that quota are subject to a higher tariff rate. There is a quota allocation system matching that for exports to the United States.

Other countries

Exports of meat to countries outside U.S. EU and U.K. quota markets are handled by Beef + Lamb New Zealand and Meat Industry Association.

=== Reserves ===
The Meat Board manages more than $76m of reserve funds. The income is available to industry projects through Beef + Lamb New Zealand.

== Current directors of the Meat Board ==
- Chair—Kate Acland
- North Island farmers: Phil Weir, Patrick Crawshaw, Andrew Stewart
- South Island farmers: Kate Acland, Nicky Hyslop, Geoffrey Young
- Processor-Exporters: Alex Guilleux, Pete Conley
- Government appointees: Sarah Paterson, David Walker

Each representative has a three-year term. Elections are rotated. The electors are natural persons recorded on the Farmers' Register. (Note: or, in the case of partnerships, bodies corporate or trusts, one natural person appointed for the purpose. Qualification: one vote for every 250 sheep or 50 beef cattle or 100 dairy cattle)

== History ==
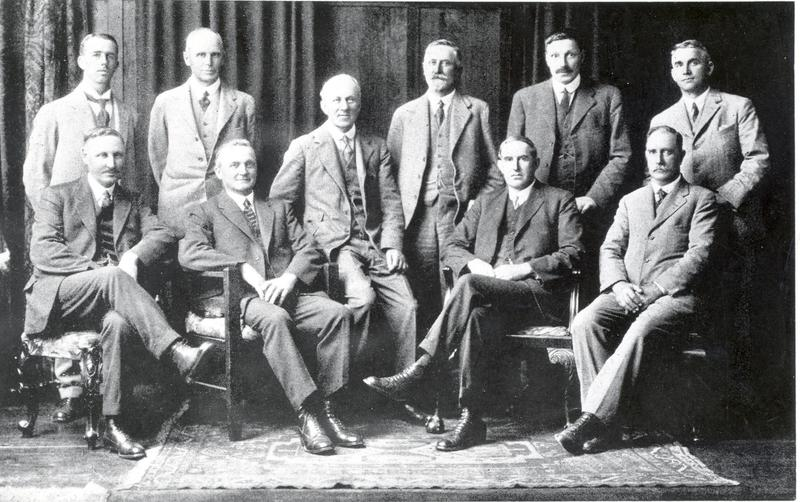
The Board, 1922-1923

The New Zealand Meat Board was established in 1922 as the New Zealand Meat Producers' Board, under an Act of Parliament, the Meat-export Control Act 1921–22. It provided for producer, government and business representation and took responsibility for marketing New Zealand's meat for export.

Initially shipments of frozen meat went to open market in London where they were sold at auction. Later large chains of English butcher's shops together with U.S. meat wholesalers established or bought meat processing businesses (freezing companies) in New Zealand and in some cases established or bought their own shipping lines. They had set up similar supply chains from other major meat exporting countries and were able to control or substantially influence the trade. This government sponsored body of New Zealand meat producers was set up to try to cope with the power of those combines.

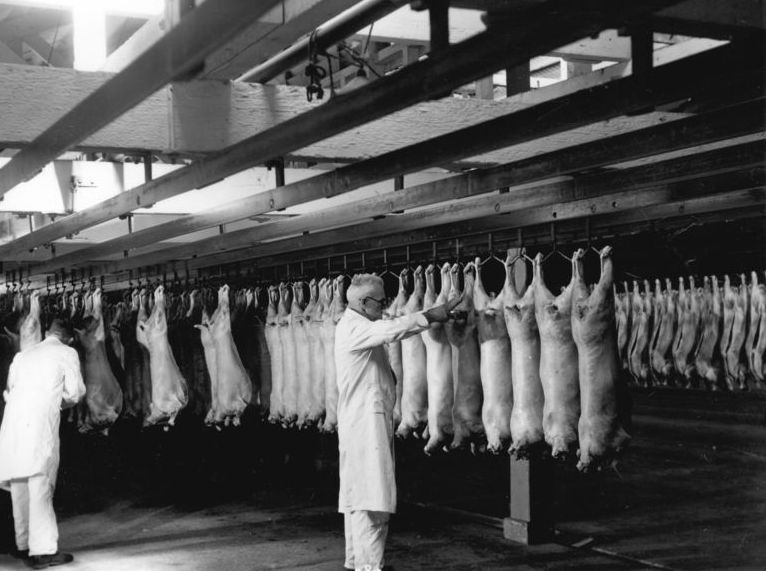
Inspectors of frozen mutton, January 1947, Hawke's Bay Farmers Meat Co.

When it was instituted in 1922 it was set out that the business of the board would be to look after the interests of producers (sheep and cattle farmers) at both ends of the supply chain, to keep down the costs of production at this end (freezing companies) and to look after freight and insurance (shipping companies). At the far end of the chain it was proposed to appoint a London agency to be entrusted with the business of seeing to the disposal and proper marketing of New Zealand meat in England (Smithfield).

Funding was provided by a small per carcass levy paid by producers.

The government was empowered by the Act to prohibit the export of meat except as determined by the Board.

=== The tools to win better returns for its producers ===
The Board influenced almost every aspect of the meat industry. Establishments arranging meat for export had to be licensed by the Board. The Board set the meat grading standards and supervised grading in all freezing works. It allocated shipping space and regulated the shipping and negotiated freight rates and services. In addition the Board conducted market research through their Economic Service and by providing financial support for university research. As well as promoting New Zealand meat in overseas markets the Board worked to improve the quality of products and supported continuing research on preparation, storage handling and transportation of its products.

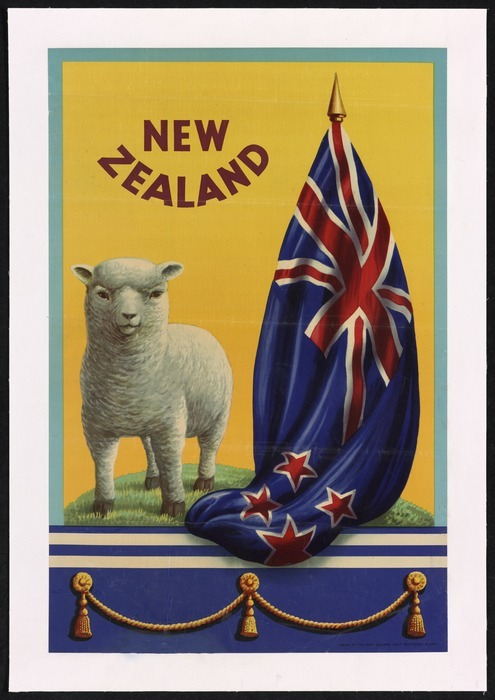
Poster used by the New Zealand Meat Producers' Board (1930–1940)

=== Overseas representation opened ===
- 1922 London
- 1962 United States
- 1964 Japan
- 1971 Brussels
- 1974 Teheran
- 1982 Bahrain
- 1990 Hong Kong
- 1994 Korea

=== Name ===
The organisation was called New Zealand Meat Producers Board from its inception in 1922 until March 1998, when Meat New Zealand was used as its trading name. Through the Meat Board Act 2004, the name changed to its current name, New Zealand Meat Board, in July 2004.

=== Membership of the Meat Producers' Board ===
The establishing Act provided that membership should consist of eight people: two government appointees, five persons appointed by the governor-general as representatives of producers and elected by them for the purpose and one member as a representative of stock and station agents. A ninth person, a nominee of the Dairy Board, was added afterwards.

=== First Meat Producers' Board ===
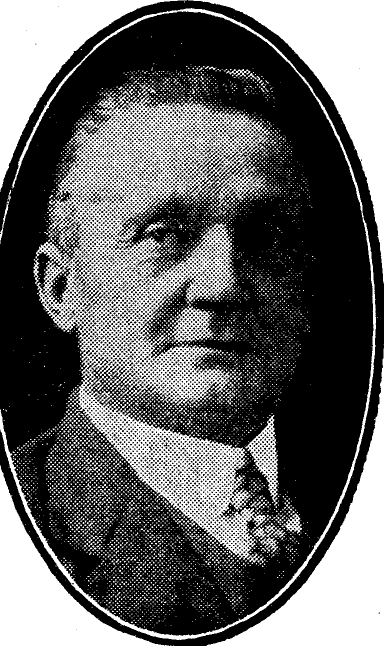
David Jones, chairman

- Chairman: David Jones MP (government) (Kaiapoi)
- Vice-chairman: J S Jessep (producers) (Wairoa)
- Adam Hamilton MP (government) (Wallace)
- T A Duncan (Hunterville), J C N Grigg (Ashburton), A E Harding (Dargaville), Wm Perry (Masterton)
- William Duffus Hunt, Wright Stephenson (Stock and station agents)
- General manager: J Fraser
- Secretary: G C Smith

== See also ==
- Agriculture in New Zealand

Other producer boards:

- New Zealand Dairy Board 1923
- New Zealand Wool Board 1944
