= Frederick Orton Hamilton =

Frederick Orton Hamilton (27 December 1873 – 25 July 1945) was a Nelson, New Zealand wool, grain, and produce and general merchant who led the development of his region's horticulture.

== Family ==
He was born in Greymouth, West Coast, New Zealand on 27 December 1873 second son, by his first wife Sarah Jane Orton, of the fourteen children of Francis Hamilton, then a hardware merchant and later a mayor of Greymouth.

Frederick married Isabelle Porter, second daughter of Colonel T W Porter and Herewaka Porourani Potae who was to inherit the high rank of Ariki Tapirau in Te Whanau-a-Apanui. Frederick and Isabelle were leading personalities in Nelson. She died in 1936, he died in 1945. They were survived by four daughters and two sons.

== E Buxton & Co ==
Francis Hamilton bought E Buxton & Co, general merchants in 1881 and greatly expanded the business so that it handled a large wholesale and retail trade in agricultural, mining, building and household equipment and groceries. As a stock and station agency it handled wool hops and barley, purchased directly from farmers. The barley was malted and supplied to local breweries.

After the business was restructured in 1936 it was renamed Buxton's. In 1963 it was sold to Wright Stephenson & Co.

Frederick Hamilton entered the firm ten years after his father had purchased it. After three years he went to work for the hardware business of Briscoe, MacNeil & Co as a representative covering the East Coast of the North Island. Appointed a director of Buxton's when his father died in 1901 Frederick developed broader interests for the firm now run with his brothers.

== Horticulture ==
=== Apples ===
When apples began to be grown for export Frederick offered growers financial help. He also successfully lobbied the government to offer apple exporters a guaranteed price and help with marketing arrangements in London.

=== Hops ===
A district hop growers association was founded in 1918. Hamilton offered them his full co-operation and his enthusiasm and encouragement in the development of hop marketing led to his being appointed their managing agent.

=== Tobacco ===
Gerhard Husheer of the New Zealand Tobacco Company was persuaded by Hamilton to choose Nelson for tobacco-growing following a visit to the district in 1914. Again Hamilton offered supervision of the culture of the crop and offered growers financial help.
