= William Hunt (businessman) =

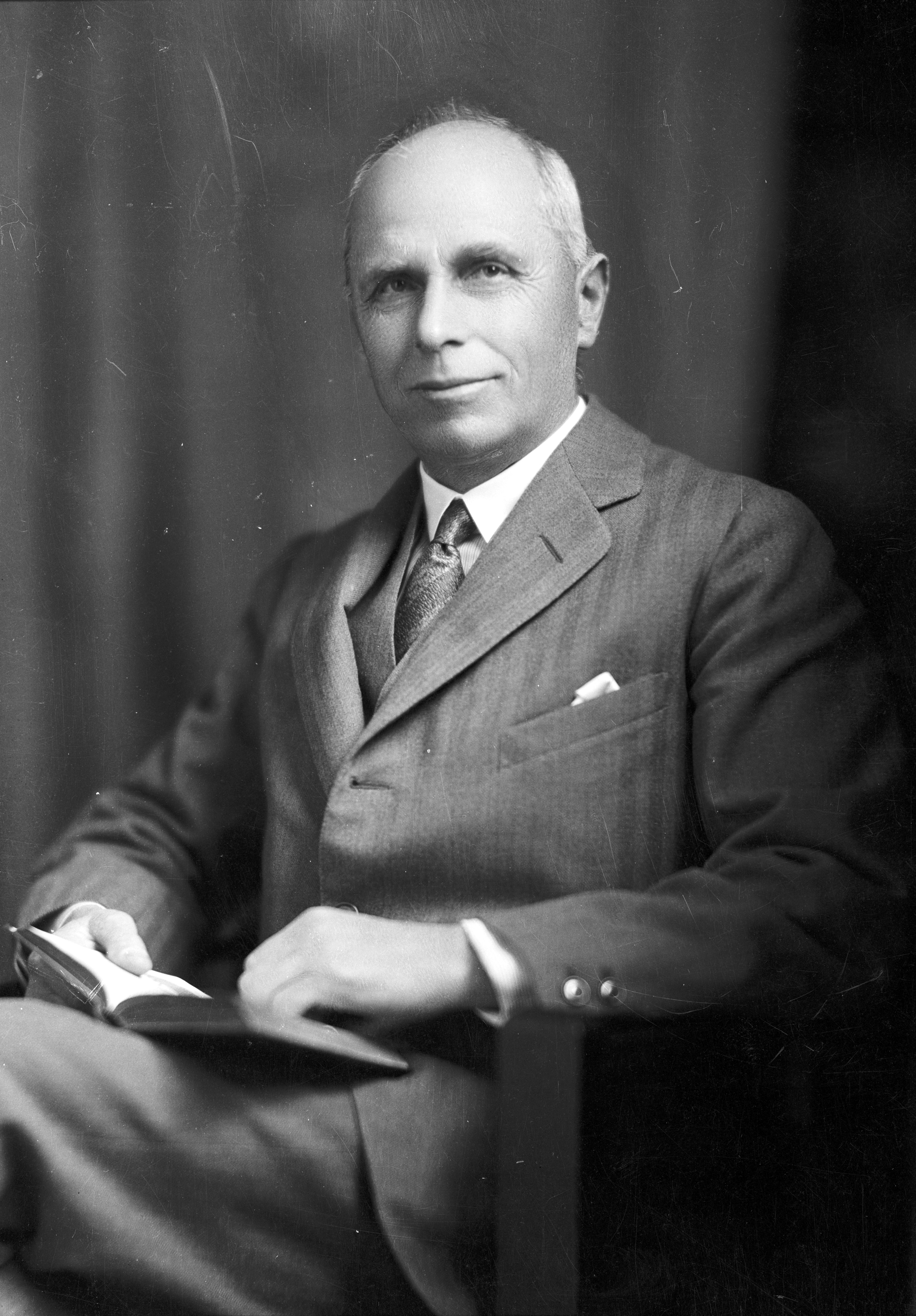
Hunt in 1931

Sir William Duffus Hunt (2 December 1867 – 18 September 1939) known before his knighthood as W D Hunt, was a leading New Zealand businessman of the first half of the 20th century. With his partner James Johnstone, he built one of Australasia's leading stock and station agencies, Wright Stephenson & Co.

== Early life and family ==
New Zealand-born of Gloucestershire wool-growing stock Hunt was the only son and eldest child of John Hunt, a farmer and early settler at Oruru, Northland, and his wife Maria Frances, (Note: Maria Frances Duffus was a descendant of Josiah Paul Tippetts of Tetbury Gloucestershire. Josiah Paul Tippetts changed his surname to Paul (his mother's maiden name) becoming Josiah Paul Paul after inheriting Highgrove from his Uncle John Paul. Maria Frances's line of descent was Josiah Paul Paul (Tippetts) - son Robert Clark Paul (Tippetts) - daughter Maria Harriet Paul married John Duffus from Jamaica on 26 April 1830 in Tetbury) daughter of Jamaica-born Etonian Rev John Duffus M A, vicar of St Andrew, Mangonui.

He was born on 2 December 1867 in either Oruru, Northland, or Walton.

Hunt married twice. At Gore on 20 December 1894 he married Ismene Helena Stanley. Ismene had a daughter and a son before she died in May 1900. Two years later, 15 May 1902, Hunt married Jessie Belstead Edwards in Adelaide, South Australia. There was just one child of the second marriage, a second son.

== Career ==
=== Recruit ===
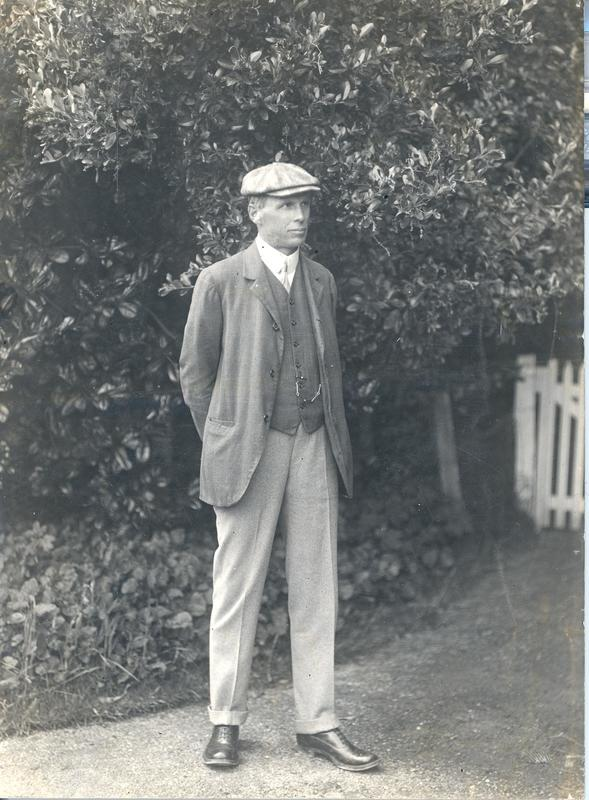
Hunt, photographed c.1895 at approximately 28 years old

William Hunt joined stock and station agency Wright Stephenson proper in 1891. His ability was recognised by Johnstone much earlier when he was employed by them for just two months at shearing time on Wright Stephenson-managed Blackstone Hill station in the Maniatoto. Though only 17 he was kept on at the station as a permanent shepherd and soon took over the bookkeeping of the station and then its management. When Blackstone Hill station was subdivided in 1891 23 year old Hunt organised the muster and auction of the tens of thousands of sheep on the property. He was also required to act as auctioneer in the absence of George Stephenson of Wright Stephenson. J A Johnstone who had personally clerked the sale was so impressed he offered Hunt a position on the staff of Wright Stephenson & Co.

=== Gore ===
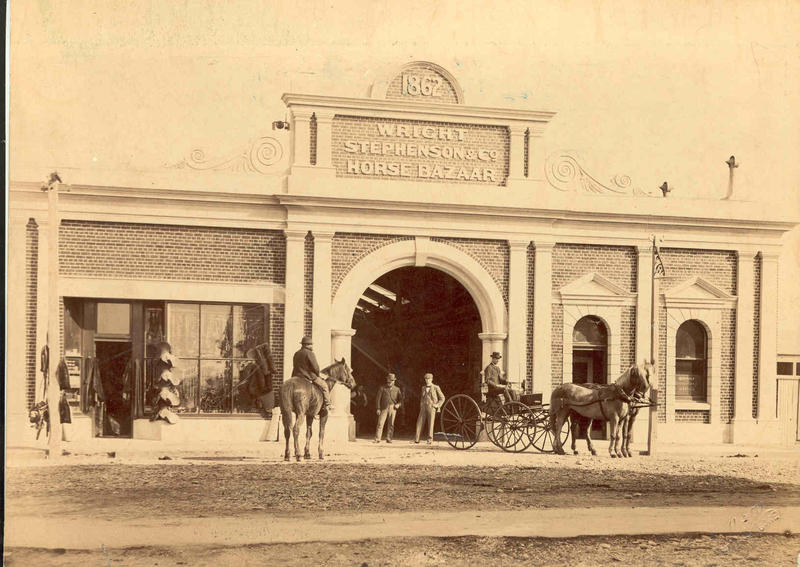
The first branch in Gore

The same year the partners in Wright Stephenson decided it was time to open their first branch. They chose Gore on the banks of the Mataura river and sent William Hunt to organise it though within three years times had become so hard it was deemed prudent to close Gore and confine operations to Otago. In spite of their difficulties Hunt's well chosen Gore customers all settled their accounts in full. In 1896 the government resumed borrowing overseas making advances to settlers on freeholds and long term leaseholds at moderate interest rates and the farming outlook improved. Gore was re-opened and another branch opened at Invercargill, Hunt being made responsible for all Southland province. Johnstone remained in Otago.

=== Control of Wright Stephenson ===
When the founding partners withdrew from the firm with the turn of the century Johnstone and Hunt acquired the major holdings of the shares in the firm. As the rabbit pest was brought under control their customers began to prosper once more and Wright Stephenson was incorporated as a public company in 1906. The initial directors were J A Johnstone (chairman) Hunt and P L Wright, Johnstone and Hunt were joint managing directors. In early 1907 Johnstone's health failed and he took 12 months leave to recuperate. Over that time W D Hunt acted as chairman as well as sole managing director and when Johnstone returned to work he resumed the joint managing directorship but he acknowledged William Hunt's achievements and Hunt stayed Chairman of Directors. Hunt managed to visit every one of his firm's branches each year.

=== Wellington ===
Wright Stephenson's activities spread across New Zealand and into all farming areas. Rapidly becoming a major national business they merged with Wellington's W & G Turnbull and Co and W Gunson and Co in Auckland. It became clear a central location was necessary and in 1917 the Head office left Dunedin for Wellington. In 1920 the Abraham and Williams business covering Manawatū-Rangitikei and adjacent districts came under their expanding umbrella. The sale of new motor vehicles and their servicing was added as were the provision of all farm requirements including bulk groceries and home appliances. It seemed that everything might be supplied until staunch lifetime prohibitionist Hunt felt obliged to draw the line at the last commodity they might sell. Wright Stephenson stocked no alcohol of any kind.

After the end of World War I a new stud department for all pedigree livestock soon extended to importing and exporting. An annual sale of thoroughbred yearlings was established in 1927 which brought buyers from all over the world.

== Activities away from Wright Stephenson ==
=== Meat Board (1922) and Dairy Board (1923) ===
Hunt was the Stock and Station Agency industry representative on both the New Zealand Meat Producers Board and the New Zealand Wool Board. The business of each board was central to his core business marketing farm produce.

=== Directorships ===
Directorships held by Hunt included:

- AMP Society New Zealand branch, there was always a close association between the firms
- New Zealand Insurance

Commissions and other boards

- 1912 Public Service Commission
- 1917 National Efficiency Board
- 1924 Royal Commission on taxation
- 1930 chairman Committee on Unemployment

== Honours and awards ==
In the 1932 King's Birthday Honours, Hunt was appointed a Knight Bachelor, for public services. In 1935, he was awarded the King George V Silver Jubilee Medal.

== Private life ==
Until he moved his family to Wellington in 1917 he lived in Invercargill where he ran stud Friesians and stud Romneys. On making the move he gave their Invercargill home to the Plunket Society, he was chairman of Plunket's specialist manufacturing operation. He was a keen deer stalker and fly fisherman.

== Death ==
Before the outbreak of war in 1939 he travelled from London to Wellington by air and contracted meningitis during the flight. A few months later, 18 September 1939, he died in Wellington aged 71. Hunt was survived by his second wife and a son from each marriage.

His obituary in Wellington's Evening Post described him as devoid of ostentation and readily approachable.
