= Germany–New Zealand relations =

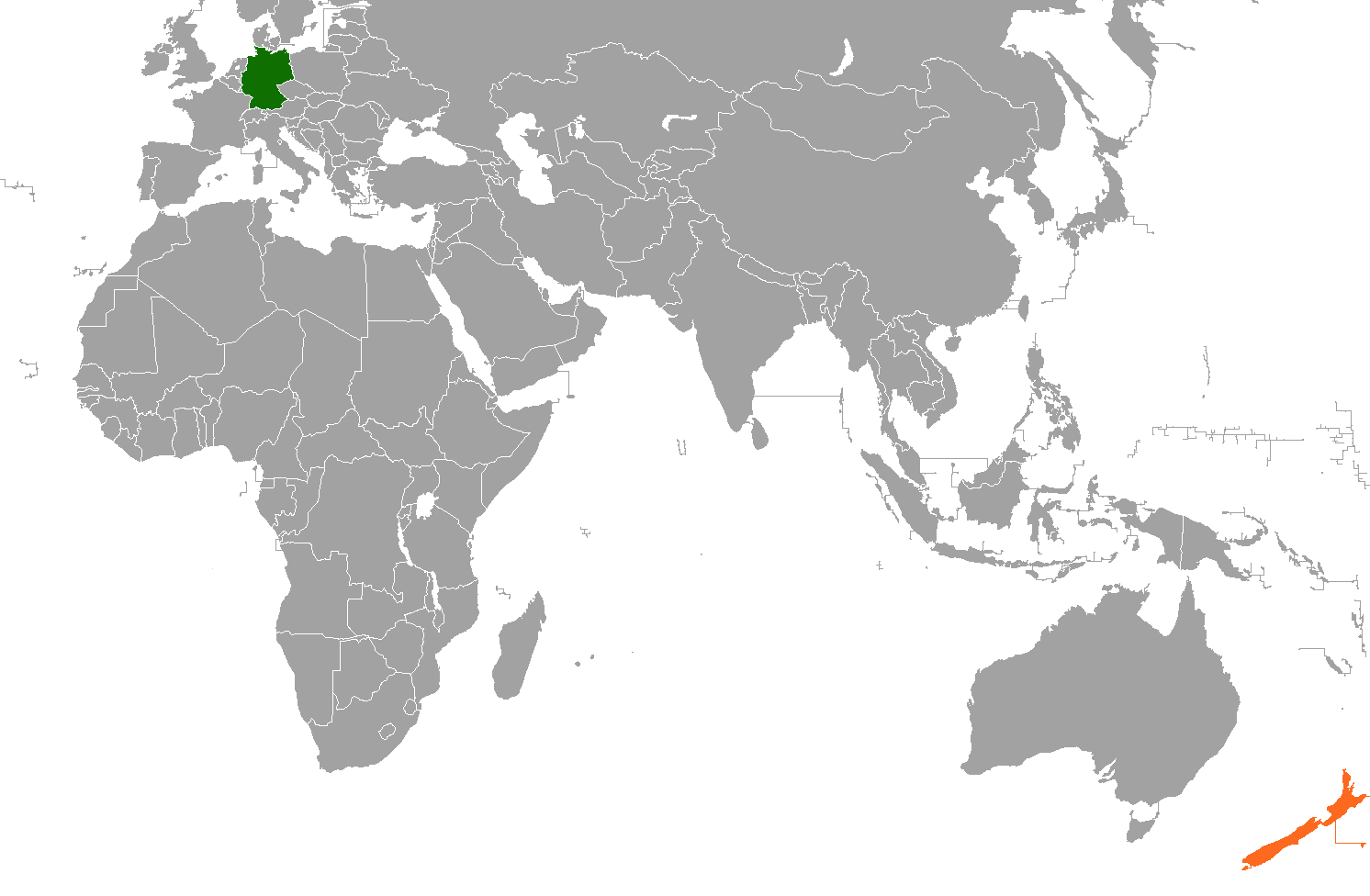

- Germany: New Zealand

The importance of the relations between Germany and New Zealand centers on the history of German migration to New Zealand. Approximately 200,000 New Zealanders are of German descent, and many German tourists visit New Zealand each year. Both nations are members of the Australia Group, Organisation for Economic Co-operation and Development and the United Nations.

== History ==
The first German migrants to arrive to New Zealand took place circa 1842. Between 1843 and 1914 around 10,000 arrived, mainly from northern Germany. During World War I, New Zealand declared war on Germany in August 1914 following Great Britains declaration of war. Soon after declaring war, New Zealand sent an expeditionary force and occupied the German Samoan islands. New Zealand soldiers also fought against German troops at the Western Front. Back in New Zealand, the government interned many Germans as enemy aliens on Somes Island and Motuihe Island.

In World War II, New Zealand was one of the first countries to declare war on Germany, on 3 September 1939, the third day of the German invasion of Poland. New Zealand soldiers (as part of the British Empire) fought against German forces during the Battle of Greece, Battle of Crete, Western Desert campaign, Tunisian campaign and the Italian campaign. The New Zealand Māori Battalion also partook in the war following in the footsteps of the Māori Pioneer Battalion that had served during the First World War.

In 1953 West Germany and New Zealand established diplomatic relations. After the German reunification in 1990, New Zealand continued to maintain diplomatic relations with Germany. Since Germany and New Zealand established diplomatic relations, both countries have developed a partnership marked by close mutual trust. This partnership is based on shared interests and values and it has often made the two countries like-minded partners in international affairs, trade, research and cultural exchange. Both nations have cultivated good relations with numerous high-level visits such as German Chancellor Angela Merkel’s visit to New Zealand in 2014 and New Zealand's Prime Minister Jacinda Ardern's visit to Germany in April 2018.

== High-level visits ==
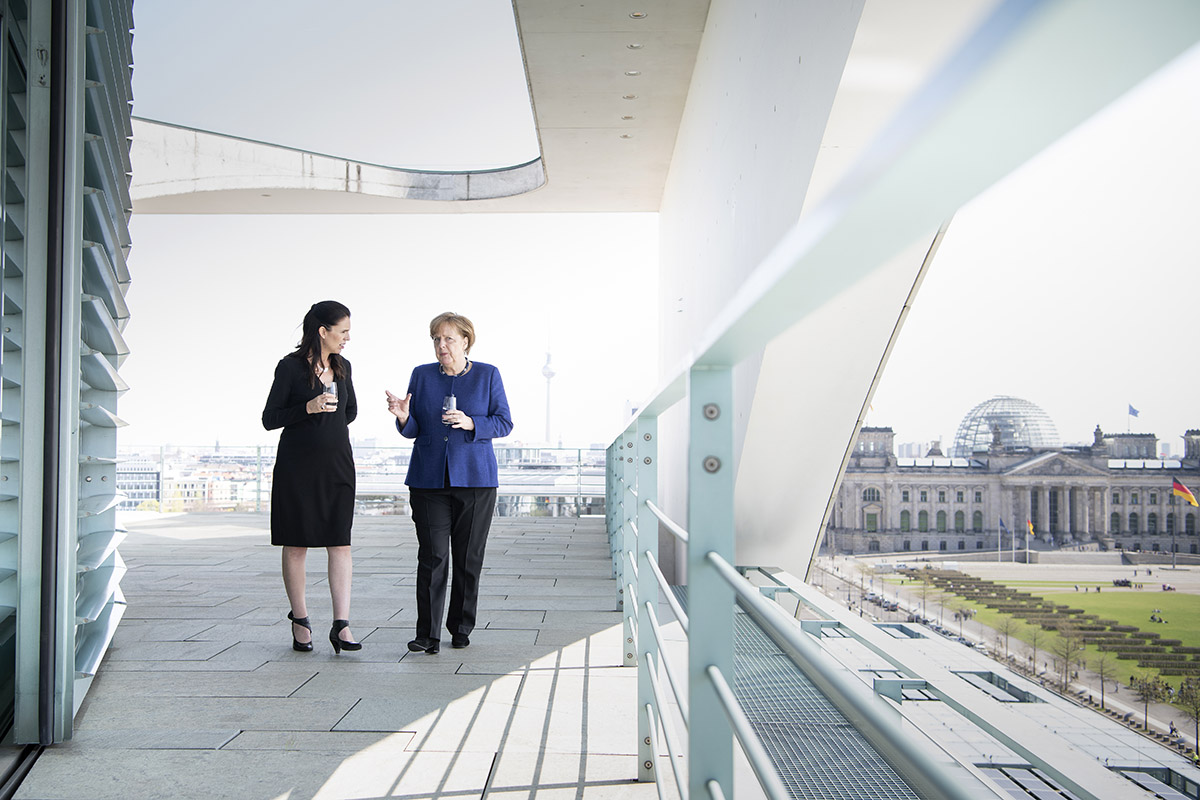
New Zealand Prime Minister Jacinda Ardern with German Chancellor Angela Merkel in 2018

High-level visits from Germany to New Zealand

- President Johannes Rau (2001)
- Chancellor Angela Merkel (2014)
- President Frank-Walter Steinmeier (2017)

High-level visits from New Zealand to Germany

- Prime Minister Helen Clark (2005)
- Prime Minister John Key (2015)
- Prime Minister Bill English (2017)
- Prime Minister Jacinda Ardern (2018)

== Economic relations ==
In 2019, trade between Germany and New Zealand totaled US$4 billion. Germany's main exports to New Zealand include: motor vehicles; mechanical machinery and equipment; pharmaceutical products and electrical machinery. New Zealand's main exports to Germany include: meat; optical and medical equipment; fruit; casein; fish and wool.

== Defence relations ==
In late November 2025, elements of the German Air Force including three Airbus A400M Atlases, an Airbus A330 and an Airbus A321 took part in joint training exercise known as Tūhono Rangi ("Connecting Skies") with the Royal New Zealand Air Force (RNZAF) and the New Zealand Army. Tūhono Rangi involved parachute jumps, low-level tactical flying, cargo drops and interoperability drills between German and New Zealand personnel.

== Resident diplomatic missions ==
=== Embassy of Germany, Wellington ===
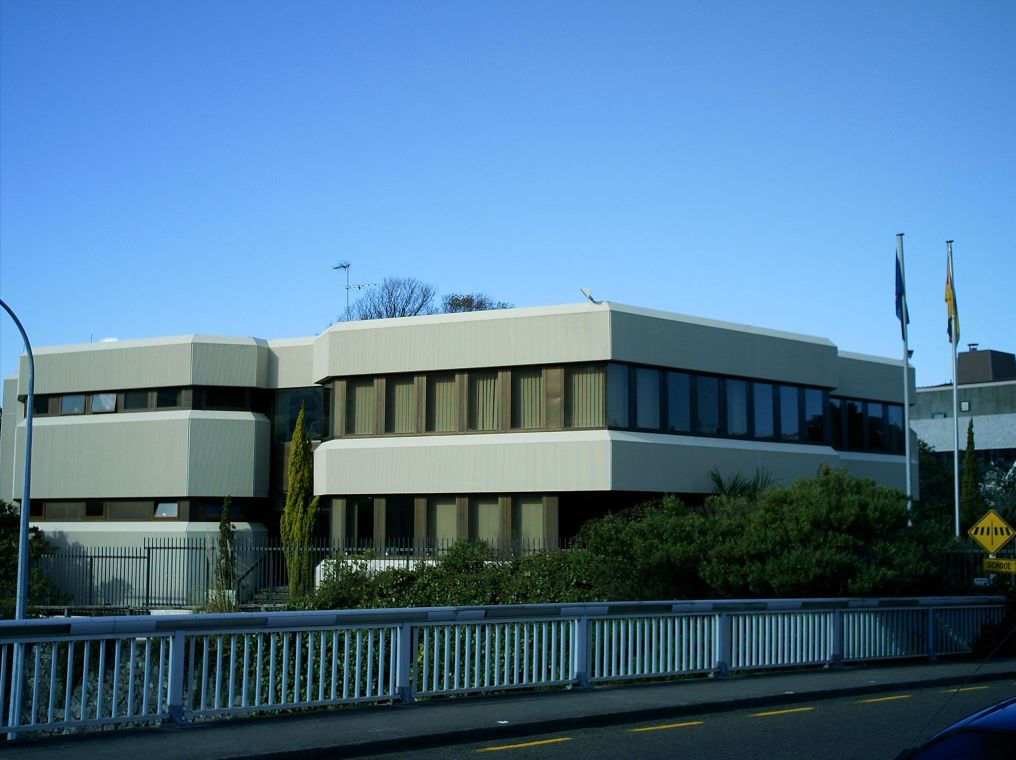
Embassy of Germany in Wellington

The German Embassy in Wellington (German: Deutsche Botschaft Wellington) is Germany's diplomatic mission to New Zealand. It is located at 90–92 Hobson Street, Thorndon, Wellington, New Zealand. The German ambassador to New Zealand has been Stefan Krawielicki since 2019.

=== Embassy of New Zealand, Berlin ===
The Embassy of New Zealand in Berlin is the diplomatic representation of New Zealand in the Federal Republic of Germany. The building in which the embassy is located on the fourth floor can be found at Friedrichstraße 60 (the name of the building is "Atrium") on the corner of Leipziger Straße.

The embassy offers consular services for New Zealanders in Germany, Austria, Switzerland, Liechtenstein and the Czech Republic and is also the contact point for citizens from these countries in embassy matters.

== See also ==
- Foreign relations of Germany
- Foreign relations of New Zealand
