= Toyota New Zealand =

New Zealand automotive distributor

Toyota New Zealand Limited
- Company type: Subsidiary
- Industry: Automotive
- Founded: 1965
- Headquarters: Palmerston North, New Zealand
- Key people: Tatsuya Ishikawa: (Acting CEO)
- Parent: Toyota
- Website: www.toyota.co.nz

Toyota New Zealand Limited is the importer and distributor of new Toyota and Lexus vehicles to New Zealand. It also imports used vehicles from Japan and refurbishes them at its former assembly plant in Thames.

Until 1998 it also assembled a variety of completely knocked down vehicles from imported and New Zealand materials. Its headquarters are in Palmerston North. There is a national sales office and import administration office in Auckland.

== Local manufacturing ==
From the mid-1960s Toyota sold a variety of its vehicles to its New Zealand sole agent, locally owned vehicle import-licence holder (Note: Import licensing announced in 1938 and introduced in 1939 allowed the government to issue licences in such proportions and to such persons or businesses as it might choose. Local businessmen convinced officials of the low prices and high quality of Japanese vehicles and licences were issued. It was politically unacceptable to issue new licences directly to foreigners or to strip licences from New Zealand owned and operated businesses in favour of foreigners.) and vehicle distributor Consolidated Motor Industries incorporated in November 1965. Toyota owned no New Zealand import system or distribution or dealership chain but worked towards acquiring a shareholding in Consolidated. Consolidated Motor Industries was renamed in November 1970 Consolidated Motor Distributors. (Note: and, as shareholders changed, Toyota New Zealand Limited in May 1979.)

Consolidated Motor Industries (Cable Price Downer and Wright Stephenson later a part of Challenge Corporation) arranged for the completely knocked down Toyota vehicles to be assembled by Steel Motor Assemblies in Christchurch —first vehicle was a Corona in February 1967, and Campbell Motor Industries in Thames —first was a Corolla in April 1968. Over the next 25 years Toyota slowly acquired ownership of these three businesses completing acquisition in 1992 and during that intervening period when they gained control of them renaming them Toyota New Zealand (previously Consolidated Motor Distributors), Toyota New Zealand Christchurch and Toyota New Zealand Thames.

Locally produced components were also used, and included items such as tyres, seats, trims, glass, car audio and consumable items. Vehicles that were locally assembled were Toyota Starlet, Corolla, Corona, Crown, Cressida, Hilux, LiteAce, Land Cruiser and HiAce. Assembly ended in Christchurch in September 1996 and in Thames October 1998. Toyota's remaining factory at Thames became a refurbishment centre for the resale of used imports from Japan, designated as Signature Class.

During 1998 tariffs on cars imported fully assembled ended as the final step of a long-term New Zealand Government plan for the industry. The remaining four local assemblers — Mitsubishi (June), Nissan (July), Honda (August) and Toyota (October)— all ended local assembly and switched to importing fully built-up vehicles.

Cars manufactured in Australia, including Toyota Australia's Camry, were already being imported into New Zealand duty-free under the Closer Economic Relations (CER) agreement.

== Importing ==
=== New vehicles ===
New Toyota and Lexus vehicles are sourced from Japan (Corolla, HiAce, RAV4, Yaris, GR Yaris, Land Cruiser, 86, Previa, Prius, Camry), Austria (GR Supra), Thailand (HiLux, Fortuner, Corolla) and the United States of America (Highlander).

=== Used vehicles ===
Toyota New Zealand imports used Toyotas purchased in Japan and certifies them to specific standards at the Thames Vehicle Operations facility. Ex-lease Toyotas originally sold new in New Zealand are refurbished and sold under Toyota NZ's "Signature Class" brand.

== Distribution ==
Toyota New Zealand sells new Toyota and Lexus vehicles as well as used vehicles, parts and service. The key operations are at three widely separated locations: the National Customer Centre in Palmerston North, Signature Vehicle Operations in Thames and a Port of Entry facility and Corporate Sales Office in Auckland. In 2014 Toyota celebrated 27 years of vehicle market leadership in New Zealand.
