= Christmas markets in Berlin =

Seasonal street markets in Berlin, Germany

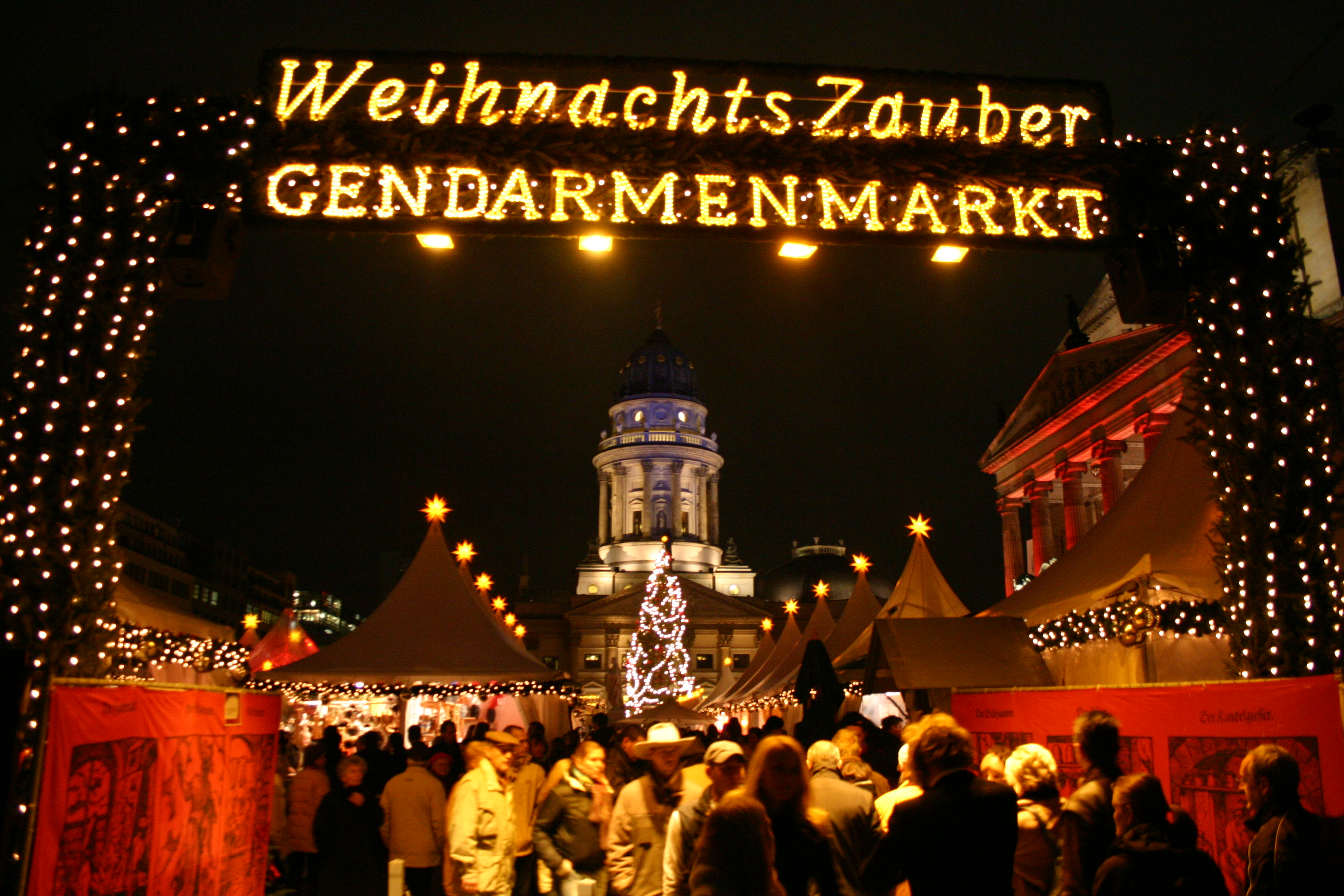
Christmas market in Berlin, 2006

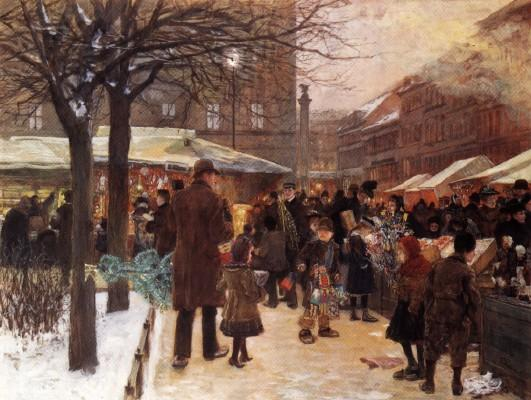
Franz Skarbina: Christmas market in Berlin, 1892

There are over 80 Christmas markets in various parts of Berlin, where craftspeople demonstrate their skills and sell their wares along with many other Christmas gifts and fairground attractions. The first Christmas market took place in 1530 in Alt-Berlin.

== History ==
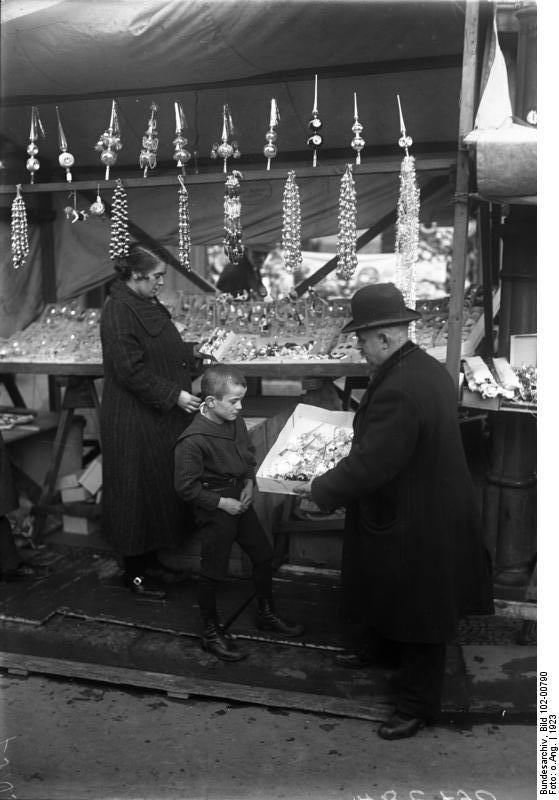
Sale of Christmas baubles at the market on Alexanderplatz (1923)

The earliest references to events similar to Christmas markets date back to around 1530 and can be found in the municipal register of Cölln. These were first held in the streets between Petriplatz – Gertraudenstraße – Köllnischer Fischmarkt – Mühlendamm – Molkenmarkt – Poststraße and Heiligegeiststraße. According to Jutta Schneider, "stall holders were explicitly allowed to trade honey cake and other types of syrup based pastries at the Petriplatz and the fish market of Cölln in exchange for a stall fee of two Groschen a day during the Christmas season".

In 1750, the city council moved the trading, which originally lasted from 11 December to 6 January, to the Breite Straße. Later on the Christmas market expanded in the direction of the Schlossplatz and remained in the city center until 1873. Since 1872, 27 December has marked the end of the selling season. However, there have been repeated attempts to keep the market off the streets, as it led to significant traffic disruptions in the inner city. Furthermore, Breite Straße store owners feared the Christmas market would compromise their sales, saying the market was "a thoroughly obsolete institution for traders, not befitting the conditions and grandeur of the capital of the Reich anymore."

In 1873, the Lustgarten (Pleasure Garden) was chosen as the new location, but it was moved to Arkonastraße in 1891, with an interruption during World War I, because of safety considerations and the construction of the Berlin Cathedral. Between 1937 and 1945, shortly before the end of World War II, the market returned to the Lustgarten. During its peak there were up to 2000 merchants.

During the first peacetime winter in 1945, a Christmas market took place again in the Lustgarten, although it was in the middle of ruins and food and drink were restricted to specific brands.

After 1948, as a result of the division of Berlin into 2 different currency areas, Christmas markets were established in West Berlin with locations at the Kaiser Wilhelm Memorial Church, in Spandau and the Town Hall in Wedding.

In East Berlin, the organizers stuck to the old location until 1974. In the years 1952 and 1953, there was a "Liliput railway" (gauge 381 mm), a forerunner of the pioneer railway Wuhlheide operated by the "Young Railway Workers" society at the Christmas market around the Lustgarten, the demolished Berlin Palace and the Schlossplatz.Around 1960, the small streets of the Christmas market on the Marx-Engels-Platz were heated by infrared lights. Even after the Palace of the Republic was completed in 1974, the entire Marx-Engels-Platz continued to serve as a venue. Additionally, between 1962 and 1968 they chose a large carpark at Alexanderplatz, an area next to the Sports Hall in the Karl-Marx-Allee was added. Apart from the district of Mitte, there were soon short-term Christmas markets in each of the former districts, mainly around each Town Hall.

A Christmas market, which occupied half of the exhibition halls in West Berlin, was held in the exhibition square in West Berlin and took place in 1983. This Christmas market, under Funkturm took place exclusively in the halls and was more like a Christmas and toy exhibition. Other places independent of the weather included: a children's theatre, a hall with cribs from all over the world and another with model trains. The market was abandoned in favour of the Kaiser Wilhelm Memorial Church.

== Current Christmas markets ==
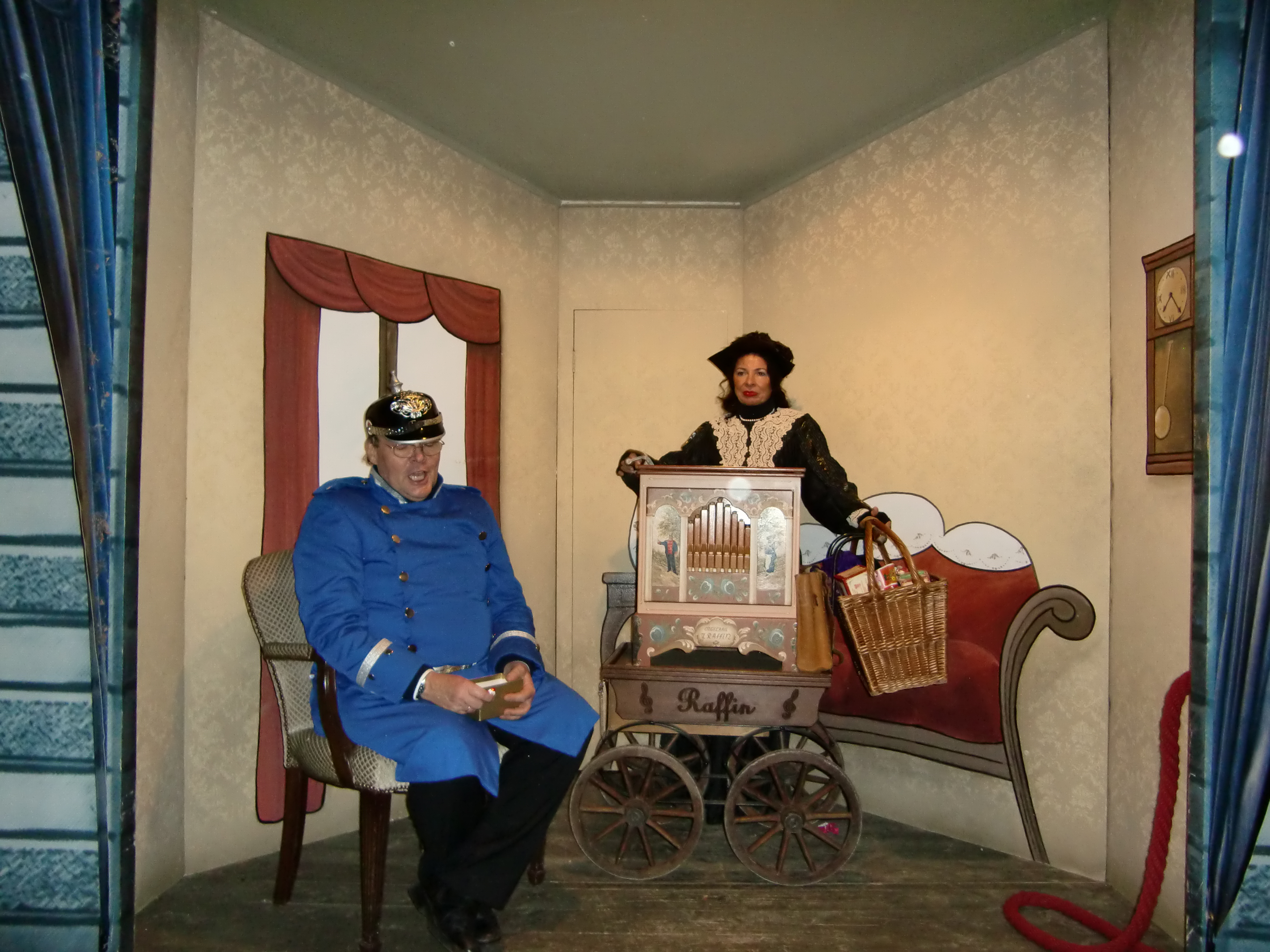
Christmas market in berlin

Of the about 80 Christmas Markets in the districts of Berlin the following list gives an overview, including only the markets that are open for more than one week. (as of November 2014).

=== Permanent Christmas Markets in the various districts ===
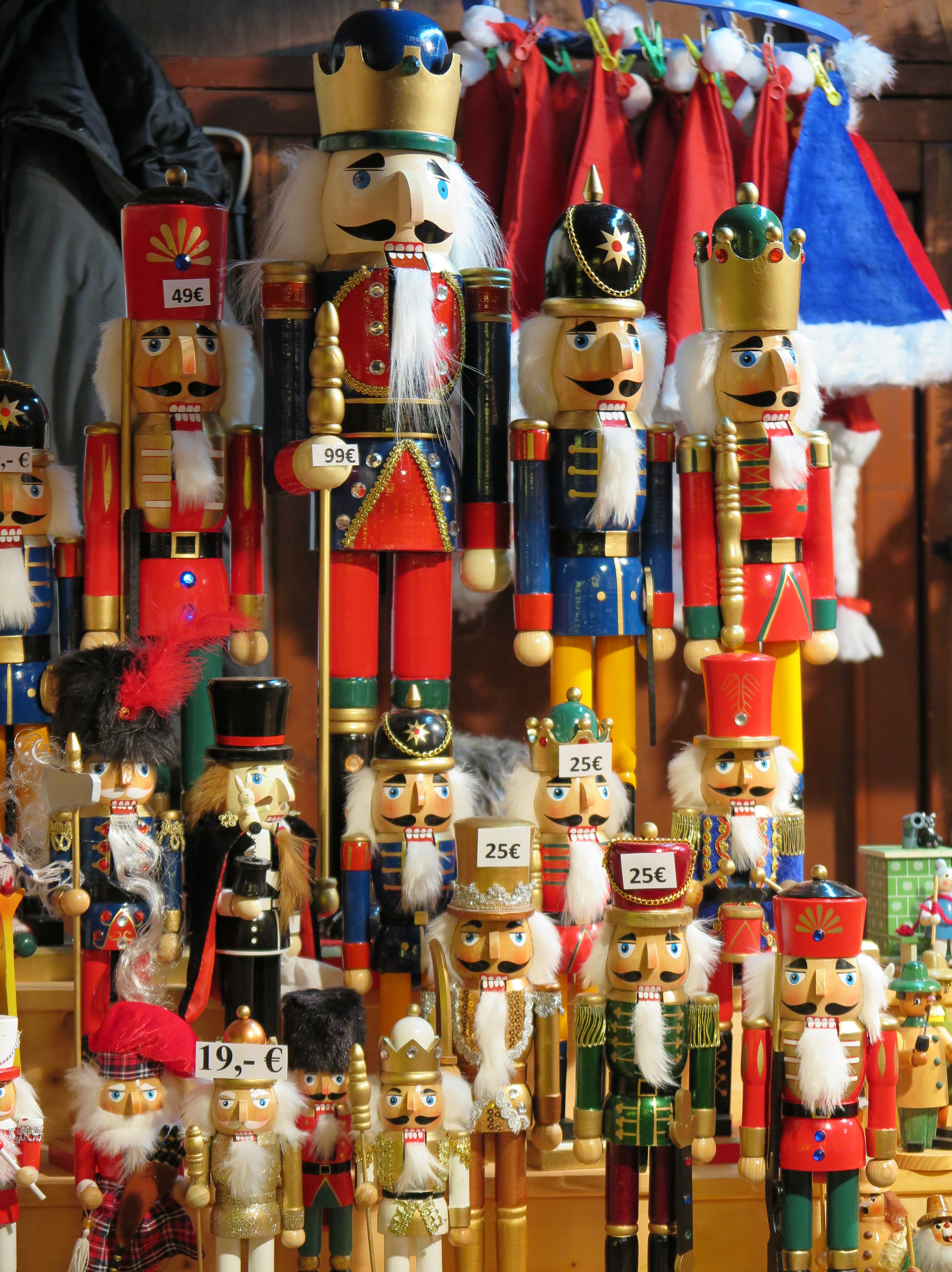
Berlin Christmas market

=== Charlottenburg-Wilmersdorf ===
- The Christmas Market at the Kaiser Wilhelm Memorial Church, which has been taking place since 1983, includes artisans, traders and carnies. In 2004 there were an estimated 2 million visitors. Standort: Breitscheidplatz.

On the evening of 19 December 2016 there was a terror attack on the Christmas Market, killing twelve people and injuring 49. At Charlottenburg Palace there are items and foods from all over the world, including South Tyrolian and Russian specialities, Huskysleigh rides and puppet shows. Location: Luisenplatz

- Wintertraum Weihnachtsmarkt (winter dream Christmas Market) at Wilmersdorfer street: Since 2004 artisans and their wares, food and drink, including almonds and other candy, can be found in 30 decorated wooden huts.

==== Friedrichshain-Kreuzberg ====
- Christmas Market at the United Nations Square: Since about 1995, punch, Christmas pastries and roasted almonds, as well as hand-crafted goods are sold in wooden huts and there are rides for children. For this occasion, the eastern street area is closed completely to through traffic. On 27 November 1995 there was an accident involving the fairground ride Top of the World The breaks on a gondola holding 100 people failed and it fell down the last few metres to the ground, injuring 60 people.
- Since 2006 "Kiez" (neighborhood) Christmas has taken place at the Church of the Samaritans in Friedrichshain.
- Hanukkah-Market: goods with a Jewish character and an accompanying program, including puppet shows and concerts. Location: Jewish Museum Berlin, Glashof, Lindenstraße 9

==== Lichtenberg ====
- On the first Advent weekend The Light market at the town hall has taken place since 1992 and is known for its music performances.
- Medieval Christmas market in the district of Berlin-Karlshorst on the Theaterplatz on the second Advent weekend.
- Christmas Market in the environmentally protected area Malchow on the second Advent weekend.
- Wartenberger Starmarket in and around Wartenberger farm during the first week of December.

==== Marzahn-Hellersdorf ====
- Alt-Kaulsdorfer Christmas market is located around the historical village green at the "Dorfstraße" and has taken place since 1996 on the second Advent weekend
- Advent market Alt-Marzahn around the historical village center of Alt-Marzahn on the first Advent weekend

==== Mitte ====
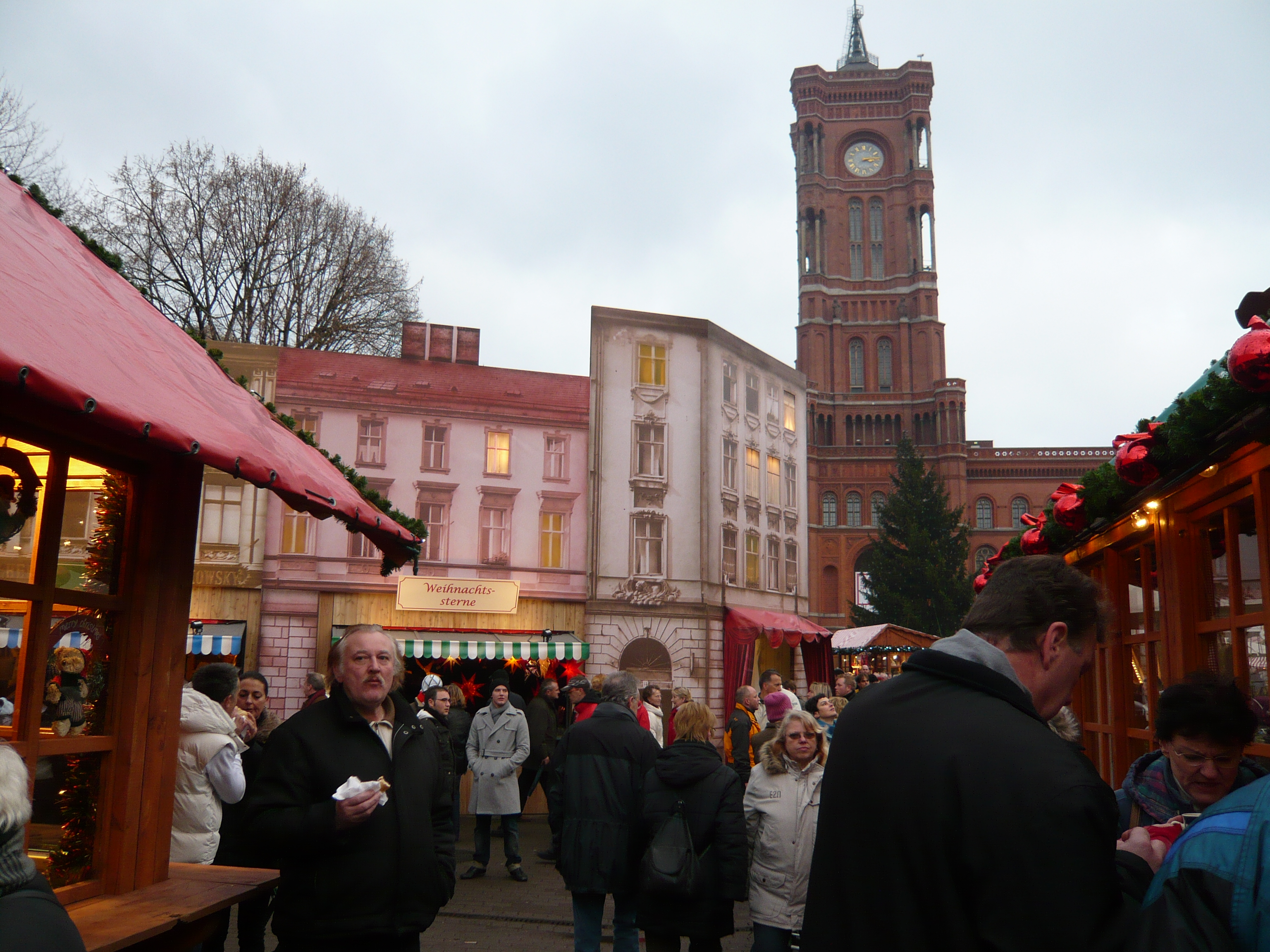
Christmas market at the Red Town Hall in 2008

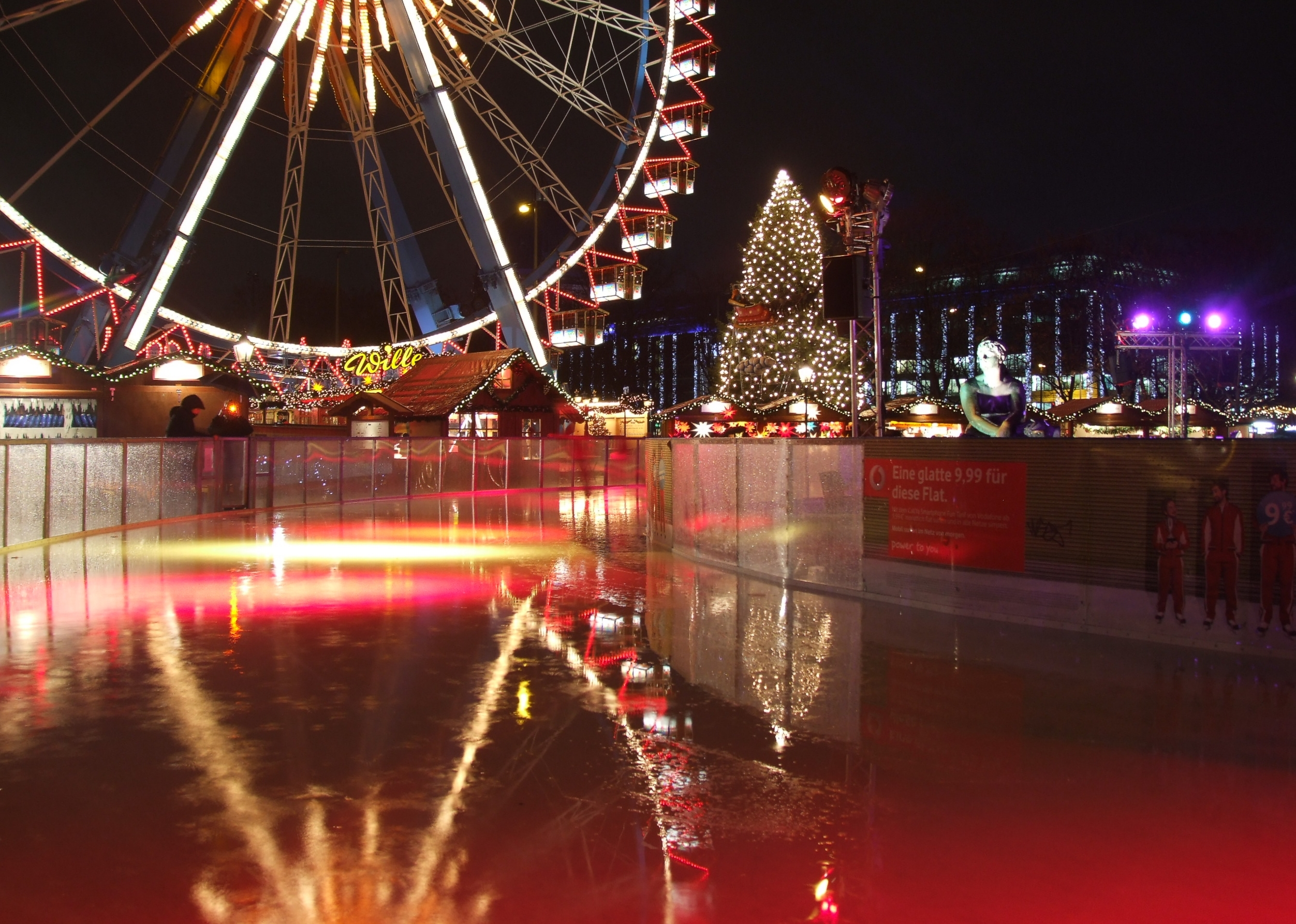
Christmas market at the Red Town Hall in 2011

Background noise of the Christmas market at the Neptune Fountain

- Although there is no Christmas market at the Brandenburg Gate, there have been Christmas trees on the West Berlin side every year since the erection of the Berlin Wall. From the fall of the Wall in 1989 up to 2013, they were donated by the Norwegian municipality Frogn. Since 2014, individuals from Berlin and the surrounding areas have donated the traditional Christmas tree.
- Alexanderplatz: Artisans, merchants, street artists, in front of the Alexa Center.
- Christmas time in Berlin at the Red Town Hall: Rathausstraße, Marienplatz, Neptune Fountain, all organised by Hans-Dieter Laubinger since 2008. Market streets in Alt-Berlin have been redesigned using six-metre-high printed tarpaulins and a skeletal structure, as a space for the market stalls. The windows on the first floor are illuminated. In addition to the shops, there are historic children's carousels and a Ferris wheel on Spandauer Street, and an ice rink around the Neptune Fountain. Because of the excavation for the underground line U5 in front of the Red Town Hall and the reconstruction of St. Mary's Church churchyard, these markets were downsized in 2014 and it was decided to leave out the chain carousels.
- Christmas magic on the Gendarmenmarkt: artisans, merchants, and street artists form a tent city, along with a cultural program. Location: Gendarmenmarkt, around the theatre. After 2pm there is an entrance fee, part of which is donated to charity.
- Nostalgic Christmas market: artisans, such as broom makers, candlesticks makers, woodcarvers and many others demonstrate their work in small wooden houses and sell their products. A bazaar and street art performances surround the market. Until about 2009, the market was located between the State Opera, former Prinzessinnenpalais, and the boulevard Unter den Linden. Due to extensive construction works, the market had to be moved to the open area in front of the Friedrichswerder Church, then to the Schinkelplatz. Because here also construction work has started, the Nostalgic Christmas Market will take place in December 2014 on the Schlossplatz in front of the former Staatsratsgebäude. The number of craftsmen and merchant stands has been reduced to 87, but a few historic carousels are still there.
- Environmental Christmas market: arts and crafts and ecological products are offered here. Location: Sophienstraße, near the Hackesche Höfe.
- Winter world at Potsdamer Platz and traditional Christmas market: an artificial snow-covered mountain and an ice rink provide visitors with the opportunity to sledge, tube and skate; Austrian food is also offered here. Location: around Potsdamer Platz.
- In 2014, a Christmas market was held for the first time on the Washingtonplatz in front of the Central Station. The motto of the market is Design and Enjoy. Thirty traders present their products in a tent, around which are more wooden huts, selling food, drinks and handmade crafts. In addition, Berlin choirs perform here regularly in the evening.

==== Pankow ====
- Advent market on Kollwitzplatz: Eco Christmas market, organized by the Green League Berlin.
- Lucia Christmas market: This market is based on the Swedish festival Lucia. Location: Kulturbrauerei.
- The Blankenburger Christmas market takes place in the district of Blankenburg in Pankow. Its motto is: A village gives itself a Christmas. Since 2009, the Blankenburger Christmas celebration has been held on the second Advent Sunday on the grounds of the Protestant church, 17 Alt-Blankenburg Street. The non-commercial festival is organized by volunteers and supported by regional associations, institutions and tradesmen, and is sponsored by the Round Table Blankenburg. Primarily, homemade and handcrafted works of art are offered here. In the Dorfkirche. The annual Advent singing takes place in the Dorfkirche at the same time. Around 2,000 visitors came to the market in 2014 and 2016, and in 2015, around 2,500.

==== Reinickendorf ====
- Christmas market in Clou: jewelry, crafts, Christmas cookies. Location: Kurt-Schumacher-Platz.
- Nordic Christmas market in Tegel: since 1973. Location: Brunnenplatz (cancelled in 2008).

==== Spandau ====
- With 1.8 million visitors (in 2004) the Christmas market in Spandau is one of the biggest Christmas markets in Germany and the largest in Berlin, according to the Berlin city advertising visitberlin.de. It has taken place annually in the Altstadt in Spandau since the first Advent Sunday of 1974 . In 1977, parts of the cultural program were broadcast, which contributed to the increased popularity of the market. Since 1983, the market has opened every Advent weekend, with more than 400 stalls occupying a large part of the Altstadt. On weekdays, there are about 200 stalls in the larger streets of the Altstadt. A cultural program with daily performances takes place on a stage on the marketplace. Noteworthy is also a nativity scene with live animals in front of St. Nicholas Church on Reformation Square and a bazaar organized by Spandau schools in the yard of the old post office on Carl Schurz Straße. As part of the Christmas market, the Gotische Haus in Breite Straße hosts artisans from Berlin and Brandenburg, with the slogan: "Living craft at Advent". Primarily, basket weavers, candlestick makers, glassblowers, and porcelain painters display their craftsmanship there.
- In addition, there is a Children's Christmas market at the Juliusturm at the Citadel, offering a range of activities for children.
