= James Johnstone (stock breeder) =

New Zealand businessman and stock breeder

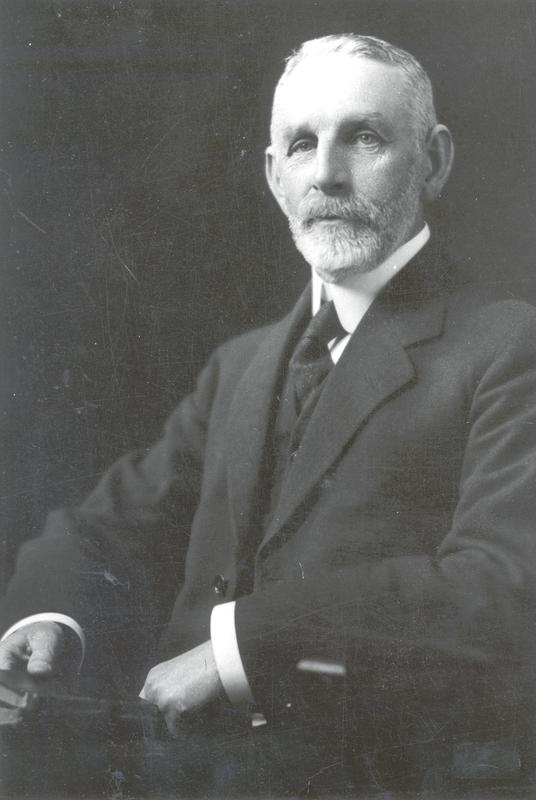
Johnstone, photographed 1906

James Armour Johnstone (25 June 1859–8 May 1933) was a New Zealand businessman and stock breeder. He was born in Glasgow, Lanarkshire, Scotland on 25 June 1859.

Johnstone's father, David, was a Congregational minister. In 1868 he, his wife Jessie, and their four children moved to Dunedin, New Zealand. After attending high school, James Johnstone joined the stock and station agency Wright Stephenson and worked his way up through the business from office boy to stock agent, and by 1885 his business skills saw him made a partner in the business. In 1899 he became senior partner and became chairman of directors when the company was publicly listed in 1906.

Johnstone married Margaret Donald in 1894, and together they had three daughters. They made their home at Maori Hill and owned farm property at Bushey Park near Palmerston. The family took frequent international trips, mainly for business reasons. During one of these trips Johnstone became aware of a demand in Argentina for Corriedale sheep, a breed which had been developed in New Zealand. As a result, in 1920 he purchased a large flock of the sheep and turned Bushey Park into a stud-stock breeding centre. He expanded the farm to include imported shorthorn cattle and a Clydesdale stud.

Both Johnstones had leadership roles in various agricultural and social organisations. James was the first president of the Clydesdale Horse Society of New Zealand and was also involved in the Royal Agricultural Society of New Zealand, the New Zealand Refrigerating Company and the Commercial Union Assurance Company. He also served as Dunedin's Argentine vice-consul. Margaret became president of the Plunket Society.

Johnstone suffered a bad fall from his horse in the early 1930s, which led to a decline in his health. He died at home on 8 May 1933. Margaret was to die later the same year.
