= Victoria Schmidt =

New Zealand actress

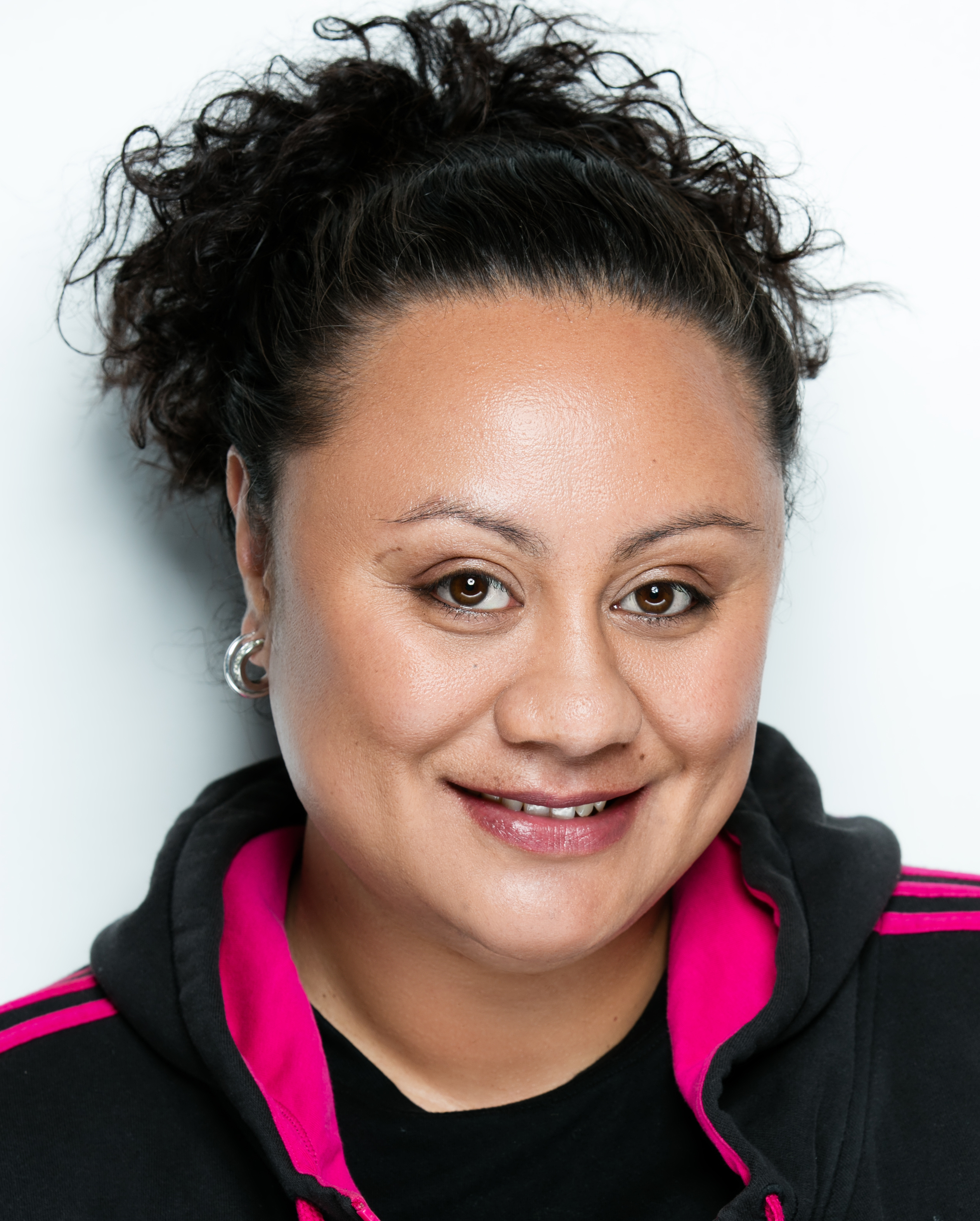
- Born: Auckland, New Zealand
- Occupation: Actor/writer

Victoria Schmidt is a New Zealand theatre, film and television actress.

== Biography ==
Schmidt was born and raised in South Auckland, New Zealand and is of Samoan descent. She performed as an actress. and was also a writer.

== Personal life ==
She is the niece of Sonny Schmidt, a New Zealand-born professional body builder and former 1995 Masters Mr. Olympia.

She is the grand-niece of the former Minister of Labour for Samoa; Polataivao Fosi Schmidt, who also was a boxer.
