= List of official secretaries to the governor-general of New Zealand =

The official secretary to the governor-general of New Zealand is a member in the household of the governor-general of New Zealand. They are the general manager of Government House, Wellington and Government House, Auckland. Prior to 1917 they were known as the private secretary to the governor.

The Secretary is employed by the Department of the Prime Minister and Cabinet.

== List of official secretaries ==
	Name	Portrait	Term	Governor-General
1	Sir Cecil Day; CMG CBE		28 June 1917 – 1936	Liverpool
1	Sir Cecil Day; CMG CBE		28 June 1917 – 1936	Jellicoe
1	Sir Cecil Day; CMG CBE		28 June 1917 – 1936	Fergusson
1	Sir Cecil Day; CMG CBE		28 June 1917 – 1936	Bledisloe
1	Sir Cecil Day; CMG CBE		28 June 1917 – 1936	Galway
2	David Fouhy; CVO CBE		31 July 1936 – 30 November 1960	
2	David Fouhy; CVO CBE		31 July 1936 – 30 November 1960	Newall
2	David Fouhy; CVO CBE		31 July 1936 – 30 November 1960	Freyberg
2	David Fouhy; CVO CBE		31 July 1936 – 30 November 1960	Norrie
2	David Fouhy; CVO CBE		31 July 1936 – 30 November 1960	Cobham
3	David Williams; CVO CBE		1 December 1960 – 31 July 1977	
3	David Williams; CVO CBE		1 December 1960 – 31 July 1977	Fergusson
3	David Williams; CVO CBE		1 December 1960 – 31 July 1977	Porritt
3	David Williams; CVO CBE		1 December 1960 – 31 July 1977	Blundell
4	James Brown; CVO		1 August 1977 – 1985	
4	James Brown; CVO		1 August 1977 – 1985	Holyoake
4	James Brown; CVO		1 August 1977 – 1985	Beattie
5	Paul Canham; LVO		1985–1990	
5	Paul Canham; LVO		1985–1990	Reeves
6	Ken Richardson; CVO QSO		1990–1993	
6	Ken Richardson; CVO QSO		1990–1993	Tizard
7	Hugo Judd; CVO QSO		1993–2004	
7	Hugo Judd; CVO QSO		1993–2004	Hardie Boys
7	Hugo Judd; CVO QSO		1993–2004	Cartwright
8	Tia Barrett		2004–2005	
9	Andrew Renton-Green; QSO		2005–2007	
9	Andrew Renton-Green; QSO		2005–2007	Satyanand
10	Adrian Simcock		2007	
11	Rob Taylor		2008–2010	
12	Niels Holm		2010–2014	
12	Niels Holm		2010–2014	Mateparae
13	Greg Baughen		2014–2021	
13	Greg Baughen		2014–2021	Reddy
14	Alice Ropata		2021–present	
14	Alice Ropata		2021–present	Kiro

== See also ==
- Official Secretary to the Governor-General of Australia
- Secretary to the Governor General of Canada
