= Cecil Day =

British civil servant in New Zealand

Sir Cecil Day
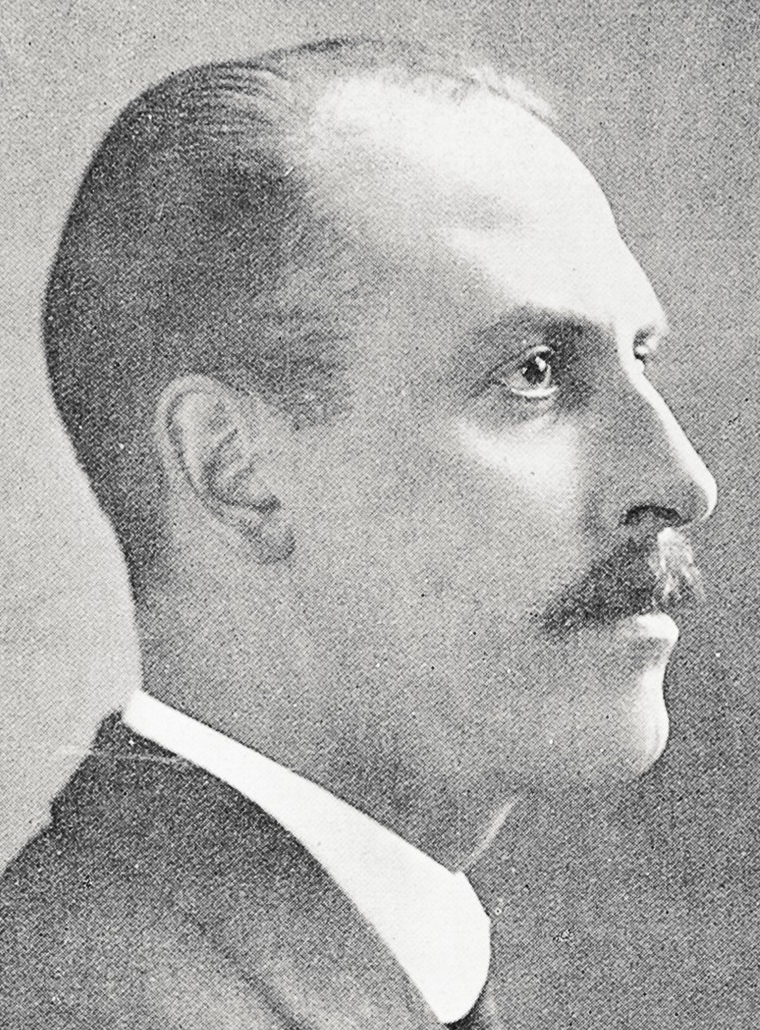
- Day in 1925
- Born: Albert Cecil Day; 9 November 1884; Newtown, Wales
- Died: 1 January 1963 (aged 78); Esher, Surrey, England
- Occupation: Civil Servant
- Spouse: Clara Fisher (m. 1912; died 1951)

Sir Albert Cecil Day CMG CBE (9 November 1884 – 1 January 1963) was a British civil servant who was secretary to the governors-general of New Zealand from 1917 to 1936.

== Early life and education ==
Day was born in Newtown, Montgomeryshire, Wales, the son of Charles Day, a farm bailiff from Gloucestershire, and Hannah Parrot. The Days were an old Eastington family from the Cotswolds. He was educated privately and at Northleach Grammar School.

== Career ==
Day went to New Zealand as assistant private secretary to Lord Islington, Governor-General of New Zealand, from 1910 to 1912. From June 1917 to 1936, he was official secretary to the successive Governors-General – Lord Liverpool (1917–20), Lord Jellicoe (1920–24), Sir Charles Fergusson (1924–30) and finally Lord Bledisloe (1930–35), of whom he was "much esteemed."

From 1936 to 1952, Day was employed in London as New Zealand Liaison Officer for Foreign Affairs. He was part of the New Zealand delegations to the League of Nations Assembly in 1936, the Imperial Conference of 1937 and the United Nations first General Assembly in 1946.

== Honours ==
Day was appointed a Commander of the Order of the British Empire in the 1919 Birthday Honours, for services to the New Zealand Government during the First World War. In the 1925 Birthday Honours, he was appointed a Companion of the Order of St Michael and St George. He was awarded a knighthood in the 1932 Birthday Honours.

== Personal life ==
Day married Clara Katherine Fisher in 1912 in New Zealand. She died in 1951. He died on New Year's Day 1963 in Esher, Surrey.
