= Wright Stephenson =

New Zealand stock and station agency

Wright Stephenson & Co Limited
- Industry: Stock and Station Agency
- Predecessor: Wright Stephenson
- Founded: 1861
- Founder: John Wright; Robert Robertson
- Defunct: 1 July 1981
- Fate: Merged with Fletcher Building
- Successor: Fletcher Challenge
- Headquarters: Wellington, New Zealand
- Number of locations: 100+
- Area served: New Zealand, Australia, England
- Key people: William Hunt; James Johnstone; Cliff Plimmer; Ron Trotter

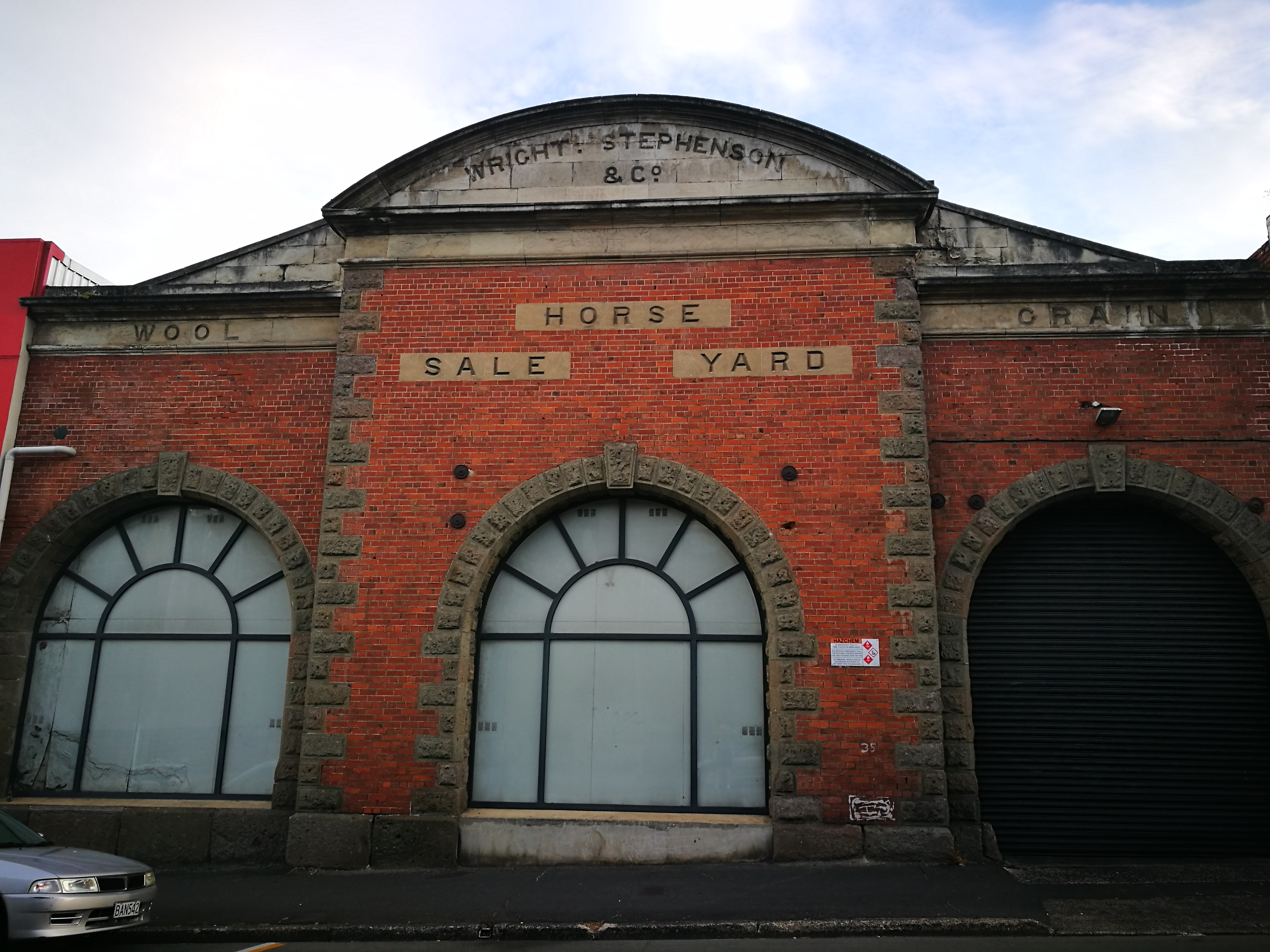
Wright Stephenson & Co, Saleyard, Dunedin, New Zealand Aotearoa.

Wright Stephenson was a stock and station agency founded in Dunedin, New Zealand, in 1861.

== Foundation and development ==
The business was begun in 1861 as Wright, Robertson & Co by partners John Wright and Robert Robertson as a result of a population boom fueled by the Otago gold rush. Robertson left in 1868 and was replaced by auctioneer John Stephenson. Wright and Stephenson retired from the company in 1899. Due to significant growth in the volume of its business activities, ownership was switched to a public limited company in 1906.

By 1972, just before merging with National Mortgage and Agency Company of New Zealand (NMA), it had developed 27 stock and station branches throughout New Zealand with more than 100 further sub-branches and agencies to service farming areas throughout the country. As well, by the time of its centenary in 1961, the company had established managerial offices in Melbourne and London, 15 sub-branches in Australia, and four sub-branches in Britain.

After the merger with NMA, the company was known from 23 March 1972 as NMA Wright Stephenson Holdings Limited until 1973 when the name Challenge Corporation was assumed.

Following the January 1981 merger of Challenge with Fletcher Construction and Tasman Pulp and Paper — which did not provide the desired financial stability — Fletcher Challenge was demerged in 2001.

The stock and station agency operations now form a core part of the business PGG Wrightson.

== Business ==
On behalf of its farming clients, Wright Stephenson handled the sale and auction of livestock, wool, land, grain and seed as well as provided services to meet a range of agricultural and pastoral requirements. The company also promoted local livestock by supporting national shows, breed societies, and pastoral associations.

Working capital and capital was provided to the farming industry together with advice on farm accounting, budgeting, taxation and estate planning.

== Diversification ==
To dilute the seasonal and cyclical nature of their activities in the wool trade, Wright Stephenson developed extensive interests held in:

- the motor vehicle industry including retail and wholesale trading and Toyota New Zealand manufacturing
- home-appliance stores, a chain of more than a dozen throughout New Zealand's main centres
- warehouses engaged in the wholesale distribution of hardware, pharmaceuticals, veterinary supplies and general merchandise
- major holdings in a quoted company operating 27 department stores
- a joint venture with Lendlease developing shopping centres and major commercial buildings.

== Stock and station agencies acquired ==
1916

- W & G Turnbull & Co established 1857
- W Gunson & Co established 1881

1920

- Abraham & Williams established 1884

1959

- Wairarapa Farmers' Co-operative Association established 1868

1961

- Buxtons established 1852

== Notable leaders ==
Wright Stephenson produced a number of New Zealand's most prominent businessmen of the 19th and 20th century including William Hunt, David Allan (director), Clifford Plimmer and Ronald Trotter.
