= Gerhard Husheer =

Tobacco grower and processor, industrialist, philanthropist

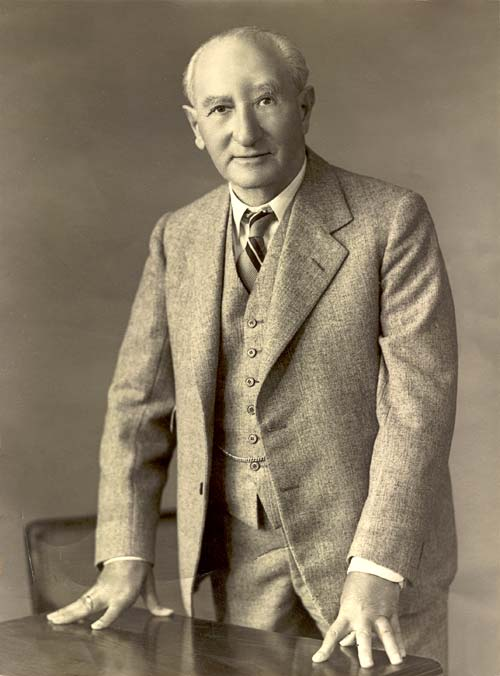
Husheer in the 1930s

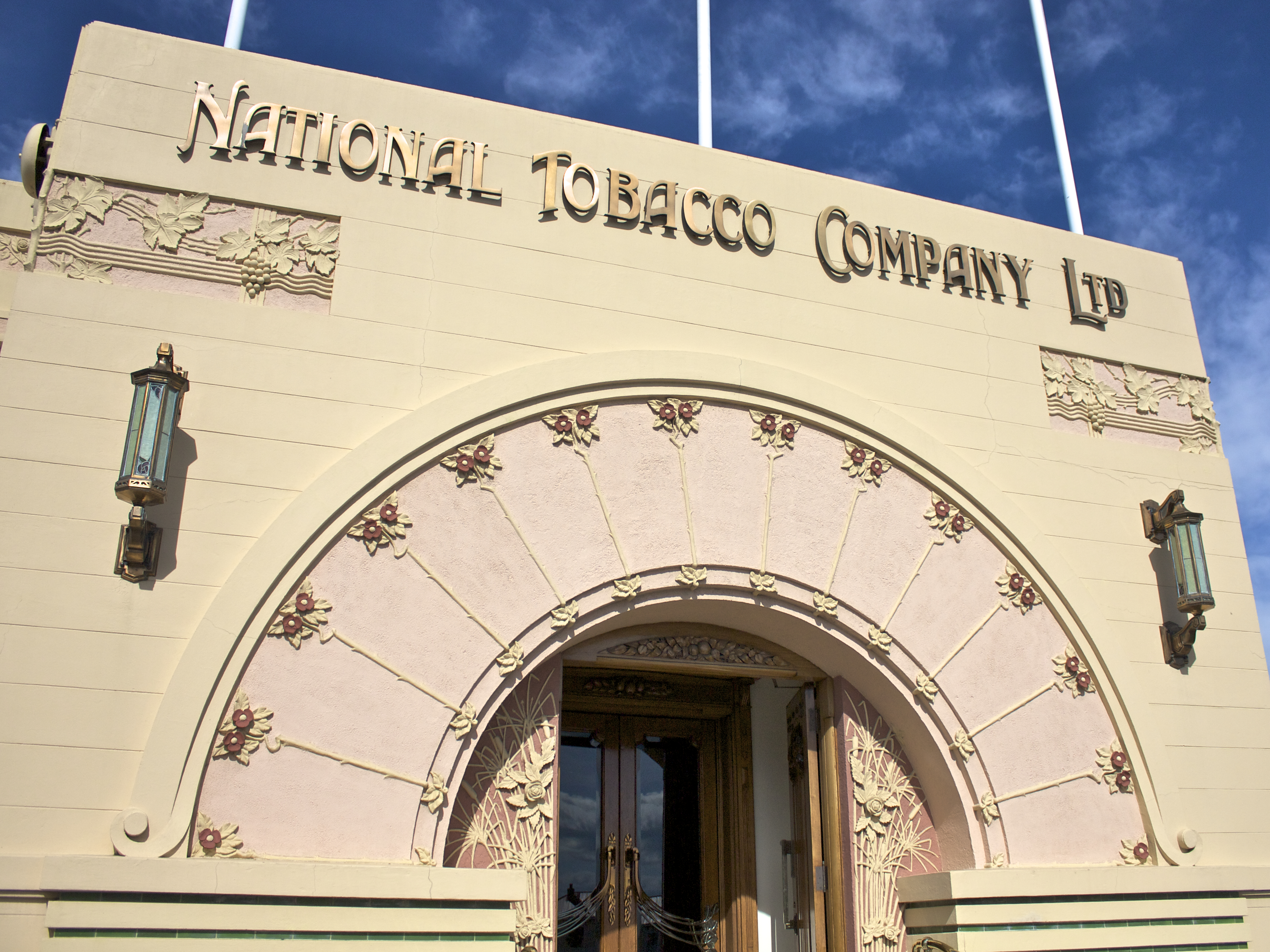
National Tobacco Company Building in Napier

Johann Gerhard Husheer (26 July 1864 – 30 November 1954) was a New Zealand tobacco industry pioneer and processor, industrialist, philanthropist. He was born in Bremen, Germany on 26 July 1864 to a family of Dutch heritage. His grandfather, born in 1737 was a seaman and trader who, when returning after a voyage learned that the French had begun to occupy his home port, left Rotterdam for Bremen, Germany. Husheer was the first to plant tobacco in Motueka and became very wealthy. He lived in Napier for much of his life. After the 1931 Hawke's Bay earthquake, he commissioned Louis Hay to design a new frontage for his National Tobacco Company Building, one of the most elegant commercial buildings in Napier, and registered as a Category I structure by Heritage New Zealand. In 1956 it was purchased by Rothmans Tobacco Company.
