= Eyre Creek (locality), New Zealand =

Eyre Creek
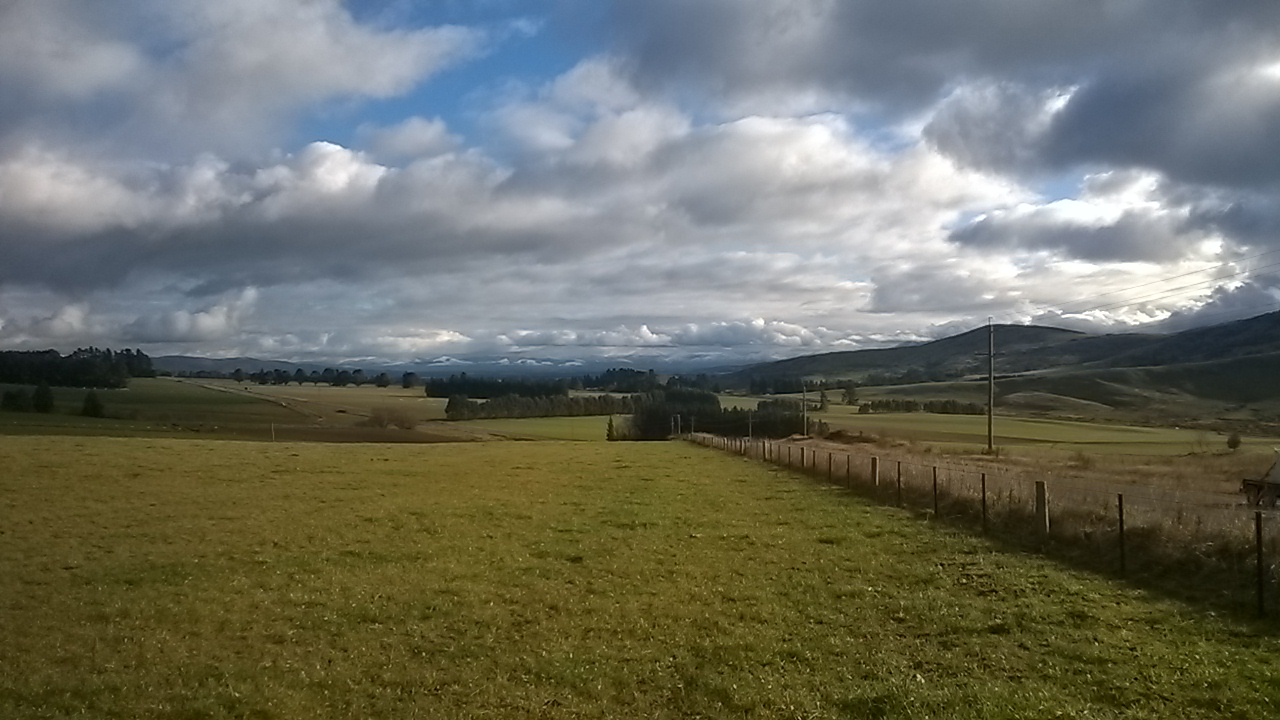
- Eyre Creek from the Jollies

- Location within New Zealand
- Coordinates: 45°35.2′S 168°29.0′E
- Country: New Zealand
- Island: South Island
- Region: Southland region
- Territorial authority: Southland District
- Time zone: UTC+12 (NZST)
  - Summer (DST): UTC+13 (NZDT)
- Postcode(s): 9793
- Area code: 03
- Local iwi: Ngāi Tahu

Memorial cairn near the graveyard which is in front of the trees to the left..

Eyre Creek is a locality in Southland, New Zealand, situated to the north-east of the Five Rivers Plain. It lies on State Highway 6, 18 km (11 miles) north of Lumsden. On its northern side is the Jollies Hill Pass (396m, 1300 ft), commonly known as the Jollies, which skirts the western flank of the Mid Dome.

== Jolly Waggoners ==
The first settlement in the area was in early 1863 when P. K. Bracken, Thomas Crawley and John Groves built the Dome Pass Accommodation House, known as the Jolly Waggoners. This was just north of the junction of the roads from Riverton, Invercargill and Dunedin and was a popular resting place for waggoners as a night of good fun and a jolly time could be enjoyed. Crawley sold it to John Heath in 1867. By 1871 Donald McLean was the licensee and the hotel was in serious decline.

On the opposite side of the road to where the hotel was sited is a small graveyard where four people who died around the time the hotel was open are buried. Two of these are known. Margaret Smith died in 1865 after the coach she was travelling in overturned in the creek at Parawa, while in 1871 James Cameron died after eating tutu in the bar of the hotel. A cairn beside State Highway 6 commemorates these early pioneers.

== Eyre Creek Station ==
In 1859 Eyre Creek Station was taken up, originally being run as an extension of the neighbouring Five Rivers Station. However, when Dalgety, Rattray and Company took it over in 1868 they built a manager's cottage at what is now known as Eyre Creek. The stream itself was on the northern side of the property and doesn't run through the locality.

In 1873 William Larnach bought the 45,100 acre station for £25,000. He later sold part of his interest to Henry Driver, before they sold, in 1879, to the New Zealand Agricultural Company, of which they were both directors. The company was not a financial success but gradually disposed of parts of the property. Over the years a number of company managers were based at Eyre Creek before the homestead block was sold to John Gibson in 1902.

The current Eyre Creek Station, a small remnant of the original, has its homestead closer to Athol.

== Railway ==
The Kingston Branch railway opened through the area on 28 January 1878 and soon after a siding was built at Eyre Creek. The station, at 1093 ft above sea level, was the highest on the branch line.

In July 1939 a train from Lumsden to Kingston got stuck in an eight-foot snowdrift at Eyre Creek. Although it was eventually freed the train was forced to spend the night there. It took two further days for it to eventually reach its destination.

The branch line closed on 26 November 1979. The Around the Mountains Cycle Trail follows some of the trackline through Eyre Creek. A replica of the old station sign has been erected on its former site.
