= 2023 southern New Zealand floods =

The 2023 southern New Zealand floods were caused by heavy rain that struck the southern part of New Zealand's South Island on 21 September 2023. This storm caused flooding in several places across the Southland and Otago regions including Gore and Queenstown. 100 homes were evacuated in Queenstown and Tuatapere's water treatment plant was damaged. A state of emergency was declared in the Southland Region. In addition, a state of emergency was declared in Queenstown on 22 September, which recorded its wettest day in 24 years.

== Flood event ==
On 21 September, MetService reported that an active wet front was moving up the South Island through the Southland and Otago regions. The meteorological service issued 14 severe weather warnings and watches. In addition, the Fiordland Region reported 100mm of rain in 12 hours. That morning, 72mm of rain fell in the Southland town of Gore, causing significant surface flooding. This flooding overwhelmed the stormwater and wastewater network in Gore and Mataura. That afternoon, Mayor of Gore Ben Bell declared a state of emergency for the Southland Region.

Though an evacuation centre was established in Mataura Community Centre, Mataura Community Board chair Nicky Coats confirmed that the evacuation was not carried out since the rain had subsided. Due to heavy rainfall, the Roxburgh Dam in Central Otago released more water into the Clutha River on 21 September, raising the water level.

The Otago resort town of Queenstown also experienced flooding and landslides, leading to the evacuation of several homes. Some Queenstown residents had to be rescued from their cars. Emergency Management Southland also reported that the Tuatapere water treatment plant had been inundated by floodwater by 7:30 pm, leaving the town with eight hours' of drinking water. Residents were instructed to conserve water and to avoid showering, washing dishes, or flushing the toilet. In response, the Southland District Council dispatched three water tankers to provide Tuatapere with drinking water.

Heavy rainfall also caused landslides at several Queenstown locations including Reavers Lane, Fernhill, the Glenorchy-Queenstown Rd, Bob's Peak, and Wilson's Bay St Peter's College in Gore was also completely flooded. In response to the flooding, Emergency Management Southland established community emergency hubs at Gore's Croydon Lodge and the Mataura Community Centre. Police also rescued several individuals from trapped cars in Gore and Queenstown. According to the National Institute of Water and Atmospheric Research (NIWA), Queenstown recorded its wettest day in 24 years on 21 September, with 87mm of rain falling during that period. Similarly, Wānaka experienced its wettest day in 17 years, recording 98mm of rain on 21 September.

=== Similar events ===
The southern New Zealand floods coincided with an outbreak of cryptosporidiosis in Queenstown in mid-September 2023, which marked the township's first gastroenteritis outbreak in 40 years.

By 24 September, another atmospheric river was reported to be approaching the eastern North Island. MetService meteorologist Stephen Glassey forecast that the Gisborne District/Tairāwhiti and parts of the Bay of Plenty would receive two months' worth of rain within the next 48 hours. He also predicted that the atmospheric river would make its way northwest across New Zealand, touching Auckland.

== Impact ==
=== Southland ===
On 21 September, power utility company PowerNet reported widespread electrical outages across Southland as a result of the rain and flooding. On 22 September, St Peter's College principal Tara Quinney reported that all but two of the school's ground floors had been inundated by floodwater. The school also closed early on Friday, which marked the last day of the Term 3 school term. Quinney confirmed that cleanup efforts would take place during the school break. Catholic Dioceses of Dunedin property manager Craig Paterson said that the school needed to replace flood-damaged carpets but doubted they would be ready by the end of the school break.

Flooding also cause power outages in several Southland locations including Avondale, Carmichael Road, Dunearn, Fairfax, Gropers Bush, Heenan's Corner, Lora Gorge, Myross Bush, Northope, Oreti, Oreti Plains, Riverton / Aparima, Roslyn Bush, Te Anau Downs, Waikana and Winton. In addition, flooding led to the closure of State Highway 1 between Gore and Mataura, and State Highway 6 between Parawa and Kingston. In addition, sections of State Highways 94, 96, and 99 were affected by surface flooding.

=== Otago ===
About a third of Queenstown's cemetery was damaged by logs and slash dislodged by the flooding. To allow for its reopening, fencing was placed around the damaged area. Queenstown cemetery is located near Bob's Peak, which is below the Skyline Queenstown resort. According to Skyline chief executive Geoff McDonald, heavy rain had pooled on the top forestry track on 21 September, creating a waterfall and landslide that carried mud, stacked logs, and forestry debris down Bob's Peak into central Queenstown. For the past two years, Skyline had been clearing wilding pines on the hillside to create a firebreak around the gondola and Queenstown's Red Zone.

To get to Queenstown, people from the West Coast had to take a 1,000km detour due to flood debris on State Highway 6 (Haast Pass). Waka Kotahi's Otago and Southland systems manager Robert Choveaux confirmed that the highway would remain close for the near future and estimated that 20,000 cubic metres of debris needed to be removed before its reopening.

On 22 September, the Queenstown Lakes District Council (QLDC) launched its first "mop up action" after the rain cleared. A geotechnical engineer and drone were used to assess damage to the township. Despite the flooding, local authorities confirmed that Queenstown was open to tourists. The QLDC evacuated 55 people from Queenstown's Reavers Lane, and categorised 10 homes as "red-stickered" and two homes as "yellow-stickered" as a result of the flood damage. By 24 September, 15 of these evacuees were still unable to return home due to flood damage and landslides.

The Queenstown Lakes District Council established an evacuation centre at the Queenstown Memorial Hall, which was subsequently moved to the local Holiday Inn. Due to a communications failure, the Council accidentally directed 100 evacuees to the locked St Peters Church. Vicar Dr Michael Godrey told the Otago Daily Times that the QLDC had failed to inform him that they had designated the church as an evacuation centre.

== Responses ==
=== Southland ===
On 22 September, clean-up efforts by council workers, contractors, and emergency services commenced throughout the Southland region. Environment Southland catchment operations manager Randal Beale described the September 2023 flooding event at the Mataura River stop bank as less severe than the February 2020 flooding event. While the Mataura River had peaked at 2,400 cumecs in February 2020, Baele estimated that the river would peak at 1,500 cumecs in Gore at about 9pm on 22 February.

Gore Mayor Bell confirmed that council staff and the fire service had managed to save 20 buildings in his town from flooding through pumping. Bell and the Gore District Council stated that the roads were safe to travel but advised motorists to look out for flood debris. Gore fire chief Steve Lee stated that local volunteer firefighters and neighbouring brigades had spent the past 24 hours responding to the flooding. The Ngā Kete Matauranga Pounamu Charitable Trust assisted with emergency food donations in the Southland region.

By 23 September, Emergency Management Southland group controller Simon Mapp had lifted the regional state of emergency, with Southland moving into a local transition period. State Highways 1, 6, 93 and State Highway 99 between Lorneville and Wallacetown were reopened but several rural roads around the region remained closed. Local authorities issued a precautionary boil notice for Gore after turbidity levels spiked at the local Hilbre Avenue water treatment plant. While Tuatapere's water conservation notice was lifted on 23 September, the town's boil notice remained while further checks and tests on its water supply were carried out. In addition, several agencies and civil society groups including Civil Defence, the Southland Rural Support Trust, Federated Farmers, DairyNZ, and Beef+Lamb NZ stepped into provide support to affected residents.

=== Otago ===
On 22 September, Mayor of Queenstown-Lakes Glyn Lewers declared a state of emergency for Queenstown. That same day, Minister of Emergency Management Kieran McAnulty reported that parts of the Gore District had been cut off by flooding and stated that Fire and Emergency New Zealand (FENZ) were prepared to provide assistance to both the Gore District and Queenstown. In response to a southerly front bringing snow moving through Central Otago and the Canterbury Region, Waka Kotahi (the New Zealand Transport Agency) advised against travel through roads and highways in those regions.

Volunteers from the University of Otago also assisted with clean-up efforts in Queenstown. On 23 September, Mayor Lewers lifted Queenstown's state of emergency, with the resort town entering into a "transition period" for the next 28 days. The QLDC also cordoned off the area between Brecon St and Reavers Lane, where the two debris flow from Bob's Peak were experienced. In addition, Brecon Street was reopened to pedestrian traffic. Skyline Queenstown resort reopened its gondola on 24 September but did not restore access to mountain bikes.

In mid-August 2025, the Otago Daily Times reported that Skyline Enterprises had agreed to pay NZ$10 million to repair Queenstown Cemetery and Reavers Lane following a slip on Bob's Peak on 22 September 2023. By 31 March 2025, Skyline had paid NZ$5.7 million, with a further NZ$3.7 million expected to be paid over the next few financial years.

On 12 December 2025, the Christchurch District Court fined Skyline Enterprises, Naylor Love Central Otago Limited and Wilsons Contractors Limited over a total of NZ$500,000 for their role in a landslide that damaged a Queenstown street during the 2023 floods. The three companies also pleaded guilty to breaching the Resource Management Act 1991.
