= Nokomai River =

Coordinates: 45°33′S 168°39′E

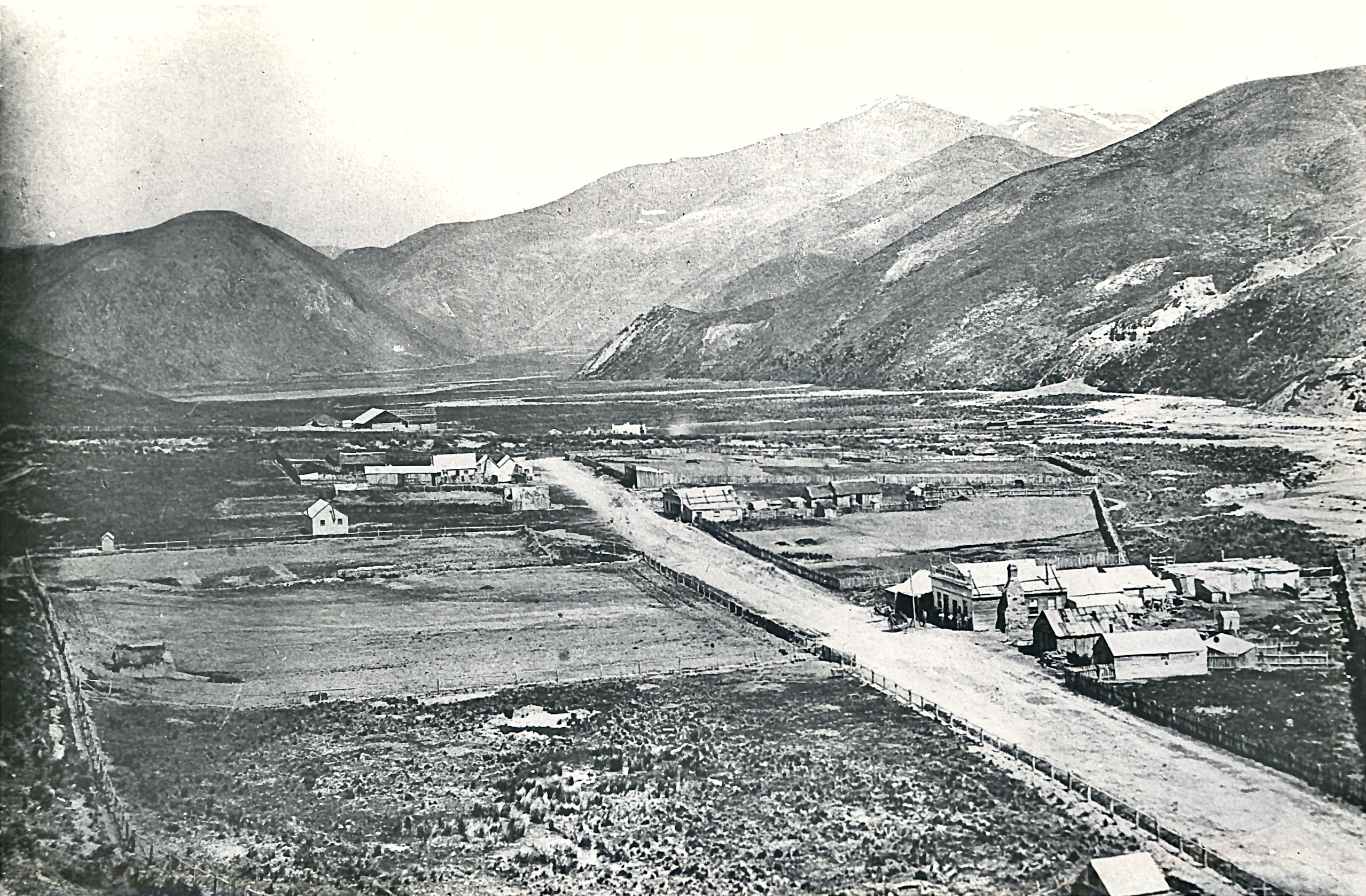
- Nokomai about 1873, with a group of men outside the United States Hotel

Location
- District: Southland District

Physical characteristics
- Source
  - location: Mount Tennyson
  - elevation: 1,538 metres (5,046 ft)
- Mouth
  - location: Mataura River
  - elevation: 240 metres (790 ft)
- Length: 23 kilometres (14 mi)

The Nokomai River (or Rokomai River) is a river in New Zealand, officially named on 1 January 1931. It rises on Mount Tennyson and flows south-westerly into the Mataura River. The valley was known for its gold rushes. In 1901, 113 people lived in the valley. By 1956, the population was down to 17.

A small part of Nokomai patterned mire is in the Nokomai catchment. It is part of a relatively unmodified wetland on several square kilometres of the southern Garvie Mountains. It is possibly the largest such area in Australasia and is dominated by grasses, sedges and mosses, with shallow pools, small islands and clumps of low vegetation. The mire drains north via Roaring Lion Creek to the Nevis River, and south via Dome Burn to the Waikaia River. Cardamine bilobata (bittercress), Neomyrtus pedunculata (rōhutu) and Veronica rigidula (hebe) are Nationally Critical species growing in the area.

== Geology ==
The mountains around the valley are mostly undifferentiated volcaniclastic sandstone and siltstone of the Caples terrane, dating from Permian-Triassic times, around 250 years ago. The valley is aligned with the Nevis-Cardrona Fault System, which has resulted in pumpellyite-actinolite, schist-like facies. The rock has been eroded to produce a Quaternary alluvium in the valley, which increases to a depth of 35 m (115 ft) in the lower valley. It is likely some gold came from local hydrothermal sources and some was placed in the valley by the Wakatipu glacier, during its Quaternary advances.

== History ==
The Nokomai valley was part of the land acquired by the Crown under the 1848 Kemp’s Deed (over 20,000,000 acres (81,000 km^{2}) for £2,000) and 1853 Murihiku (6,900,000 acres (28,000 km^{2}) for £2,600) purchases. The 1998 Ngāi Tahu Settlement redressed some of the injustices.

Donald Angus Cameron (1835-1918) left Scotland in 1854, worked at Penola, sailed from Melbourne to Dunedin in 1859, took his sheep to the Nokomai valley that and the following year and named it after Glenfalloch (hidden glen), near his Inverness birthplace. Glenfalloch station was sold to Frank Hall, or Hore in 1950, with whose family it remains, as a sheep and beef station of 33,184 ha (82,000 acres), on a high country pastoral lease, which extends into the Nevis valley to the north.

=== Gold ===
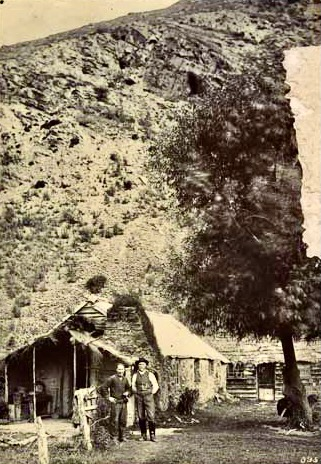
Store at Nokomai River in 1903

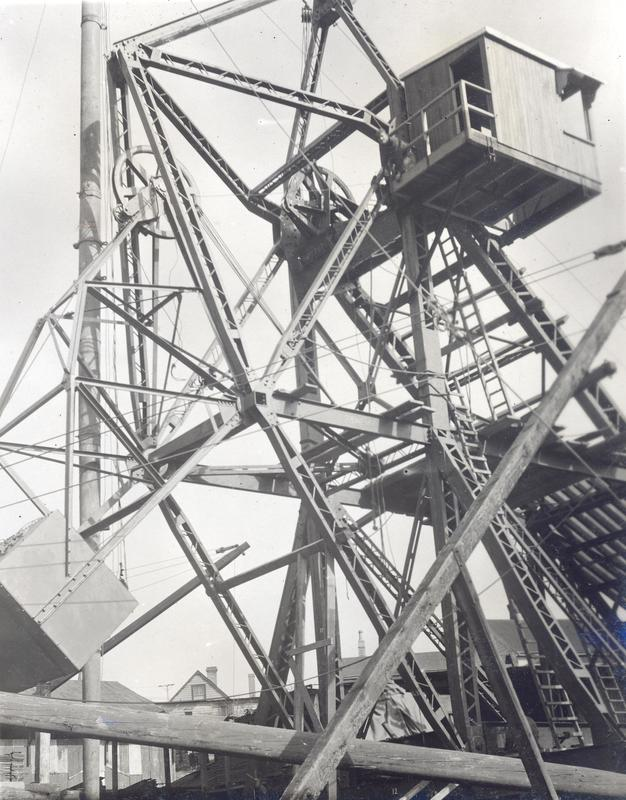
The dragline

Victoria Gully, an eastern tributary of Nokomai, had its first gold rush when 6 Victorian miners, including James Lamb, discovered alluvial gold in 1862 and named it after their place of origin. It was one of the smaller gold fields, producing 1,984 oz (56.2 kg) in 1862, though a government report in 1865 said it had more than justified expectations. Charles Sew Hoy and his family mined the valley from January 1894. Sew Hoy built two aqueducts to the valley. The 47 km (29 mi) race from Roaring Lion Creek in the Garvie mountains, to the north, took 3 years to cut. Since 2014, it has had Roaring Lion walking and mountain-biking track alongside it from Garston, which includes Mud Hut and Slate Hut. In 1932 The Nokomai Gold Mining Coy Ltd was floated, with capital of over £60,000 and a 150 ton, 50 ft (15 m)-high, dragline excavator was assembled. It was found unsuitable and was last used on 12 April 1934. The mine closed in February 1943. The dredge was sold for use in the Avon River / Ōtākaro and its generator for the Fraser River, both in 1948. Gold was mined again from 1991.

Cinnabar, almandine, magnetite, spessartine, and grossular garnets also occur in the valley.

=== Township ===
A 1924 report claimed that during the gold rushes Nokomai township had over 2,000 people, but by 1924 Glenfalloch's stone homestead stood alone. In the 1870s, there was a wide main street, with Thomas Aiton’s Myall Hotel, Thomas Whitaker's Provincial Hotel (c.1862-76) and Job Coulam's United States Hotel (burnt down in 1888). As well as running a store and hotel, Thomas Aiton was also secretary of a gold mining company wound up in 1874. After a petition to the Education Board, on 31 October 1870, a school for 50 children opened. In 1922, it had 9 students. The school seems to have closed between 1938 and 1943, attendance still being recorded in 1934. However, the 1924 report said it had closed and its bell moved to Athol school. The teacher, Henry Thurston Evans, set up the Nokomai Weekly Herald, which was hand-written on four pages of small post folio. It lasted a year from 11 November 1871.

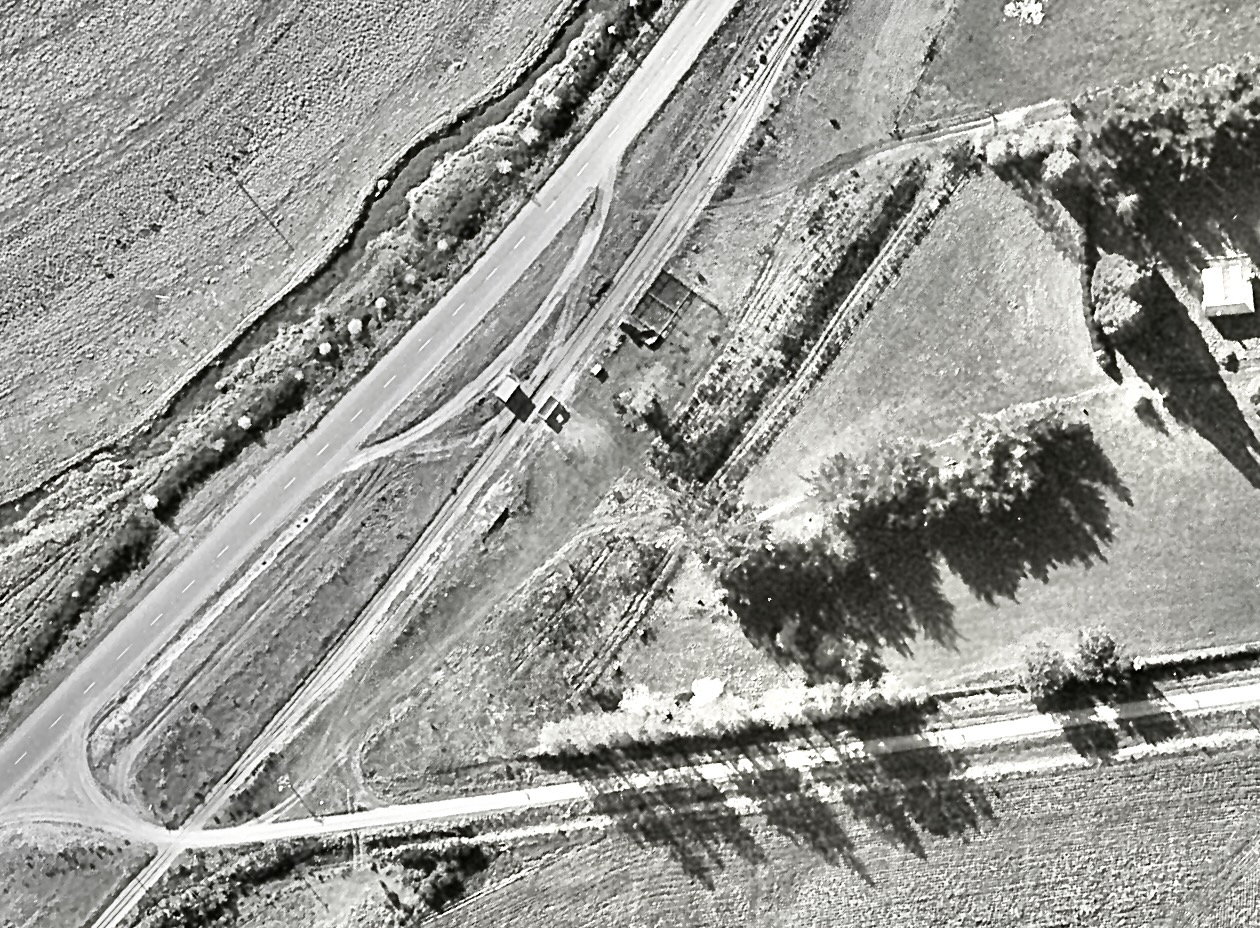
Nokomai railway station in 1964

=== Railway station ===
About 8 mi (13 km) from the Nokomai valley, was a flag station named Nokomai, on the Kingston branch railway. It was west of the Slate Range, in the Mataura valley, 72 mi 74 ch (117.4 km) from Invercargill, opened about July 1881 and closed to passengers on 4 October 1937 and completely on 25 November 1979. It had a shelter shed on a platform with a cart approach. A siding was added in 1895. The station was 298 m (978 ft) above sea level, 7.81 km (4.85 mi) north of Athol and 2.47 km (1.53 mi) south of Garston. The site is now on the Around the mountains cycle trail.

== See also ==
- List of rivers of New Zealand
