= Parawa (disambiguation) =

Parawa is a locality in New Zealand.

Parawa may also refer to.

- Parawa, the Aboriginal name for the headland of Cape Jervis in South Australia
- Parawa, an alternative name for the village of Parva, Parbhani in India
- Parawa, South Australia, a locality
- Parawa language, a South American indigenous language
