= Gummies Bush =

- Location within New Zealand
- Coordinates: 46°17′S 168°01′E
- Country: New Zealand
- Island: South Island
- Region: Southland
- Territorial authority: Southland District
- Time zone: UTC+12 (NZST)
  - Summer (DST): UTC+13 (NZDT)
- Postcode(s): 9883
- Area code: 03
- Local iwi: Ngāi Tahu

Gummies Bush is a farming locality in Southland, New Zealand, 10 kilometres (6.2 mi) west of the Aparima River, 9 kilometres (5.6 mi) north of Riverton, and 18 kilometres (11 mi) south from Otautau. It is said to be named after whaler and later pig-farmer James Leader, nicknamed "Gummie" because he had no teeth. Leader had a camp in the bush in this location. To Māori, the area was known as Opuaki. It was apparently named after a person, Puaki, a word which means "to come forth in position," or "to come forth in language – that is to utter.
