= List of historic places in Southland District =

Listed historic places in Southland, NZ

This list of Heritage New Zealand-listed places in Southland District contains those buildings and structures that are listed with Heritage New Zealand (formerly known as Historic Places Trust) in the Southland District of New Zealand.

Heritage New Zealand is a Crown entity and the national heritage agency. With a head office in Wellington, the Dunedin area office is responsible for the Southland Region.

McCallum's Shed in Winton was listed as a Category I historic place with registration number 3268 until it was demolished in 2014.

Image	Article	Description	Location	Street address	Built	Date listed	Heritage category
	Clifden Suspension Bridge	bridge in New Zealand	Clifden	324 State Highway 99, Waiau River, Clifden 9691	1899	1990-02-15	NZHPT Category I listing
	Otautau Museum	museum and archive for Otautau and surrounding districts	Otautau	146 Main Street, Otautau 9610		2010-10-15	NZHPT Category II listing
	Stone Hut – Blue Lakes	historic hut in New Zealand	Waikaia	Waikaia Piano Flat Rd, Glenaray Station, Waikaia		1990-04-19	NZHPT Category II listing
	Corrugated Iron Hut – Blue Lakes	historic hut in New Zealand	Waikaia	Waikaia Piano Flat Rd, Glenaray Station, Waikaia		1990-04-19	NZHPT Category II listing
	Corrugated Iron Hut (1950s) – Blue Lakes	historic hut in New Zealand	Waikaia	Waikaia Piano Flat Rd, Glenaray Station, Waikaia		1990-04-19	NZHPT Category II listing
	Bush Huts	historic hut in New Zealand	Waikaia	Waikaia Piano Flat Rd, Glenaray Station, Waikaia		1990-04-19	NZHPT Category II listing
	Travellers Rest	boarding house on Stewart Island / Rakiura	Stewart Island / Rakiura	65 Leask Bay Road, Stewart Island / Rakiura		2009-08-13	NZHPT Category I listing
	Railway Hotel	hotel in Winton, New Zealand	Winton	232–234 Great North Road, Winton		2011-12-15	NZHPT Category II listing
	Jamieson's Restaurant	restaurant in New Zealand	Winton	206–210 Great North Road, Winton		2012-06-28	NZHPT Category II listing
	Howell's Cottage	New Zealand heritage building	Riverton / Aparima	22 Napier Street, Riverton		1992-02-20	NZHPT Category I listing
	Holy Trinity Church	church building in Winton, New Zealand	Winton	252 Great North Road (State Highway 6) And Meldrum Street, Winton		2011-12-15	NZHPT Category II listing
	Winton Great North Road Historic Area	Historic Area in New Zealand	Winton	Great North Road And Meldrum Street, Winton		2003-06-13	Historic Area
