= Hokonui =

The term Hokonui refers to several things in New Zealand, all directly or indirectly related to the area around the Southland town of Gore:

- The Hokonui Hills and the area surrounding them, often simply known as Hokonui or the Hokonuis
- Hokonui, New Zealand, a small settlement near Hedgehope
- Hokonui (radio network), a radio network based in Gore
- Moonshine alcohol
- Colloquialism for any alcoholic beverage
- Hokonui Moonshine, a present-day (legal) alcohol brand produced by the Southern Distilling Company
- Hokonui (New Zealand electorate), a former parliamentary electorate
- Hokonui Rūnanga, a constituent part of the Ngāi Tahu Māori tribal area
- Hokonui Coal Company
