= Southland District =

- Territorial authority district
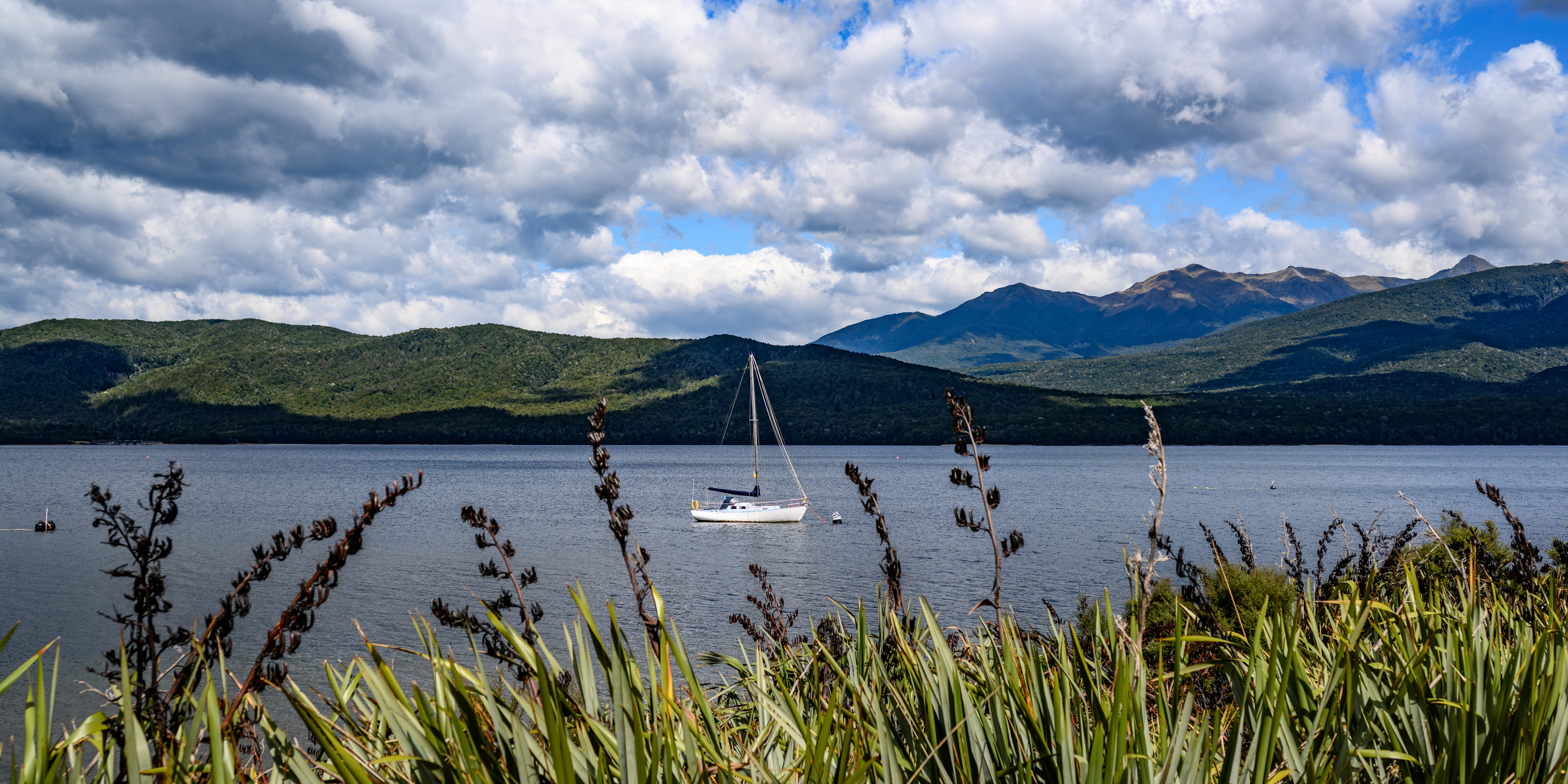
- Lake Te Anau

- Southland district in the South Island
- Coordinates: 45°38′00″S 167°55′01″E
- Country: New Zealand
- Region: Southland Region
- Communities: Ardlussa; Fiordland; Northern; Oraka Aparima; Oreti; Stewart Island/Rakiura; Tuatapere Te Waewae; Waihopai Toetoe; Wallace Takitimu
- Wards: Mararoa Waimea; Stewart Island Rakiura; Waiau Aparima; Waihopai Toetoes; Winton Wallacetown
- Formed: 1989
- Seat: Invercargill

Government
  - Mayor: Rob Scott
  - Territorial authority: Southland District Council

Area
  - Land: 29,575.19 km^{2} (11,419.04 sq mi)

Population (June 2025)
  - Total: 33,900
  - Density: 1.15/km^{2} (2.97/sq mi)
- Time zone: UTC+12 (NZST)
  - Summer (DST): UTC+13 (NZDT)
- Postcode(s): Map of postcodes
- Website: www.southlanddc.govt.nz

Southland District is a New Zealand territorial authority district that covers most of the southern end of the South Island as well as Stewart Island.

== History ==
Southland District was formed through the 1989 local government reforms. Four local authorities were amalgamated at that time: Wallace County, Winton Borough, Stewart Island County and most of Southland County. John Casey, who was first elected onto Southland County Council in 1977, oversaw the amalgamation and was elected Southland District's first mayor in 1989.

Winton Wallacetown Ward was renamed Oreti Ward with effect from the Council election on 12 October 2019. The Ōreti River flows through this ward.

== Geography ==
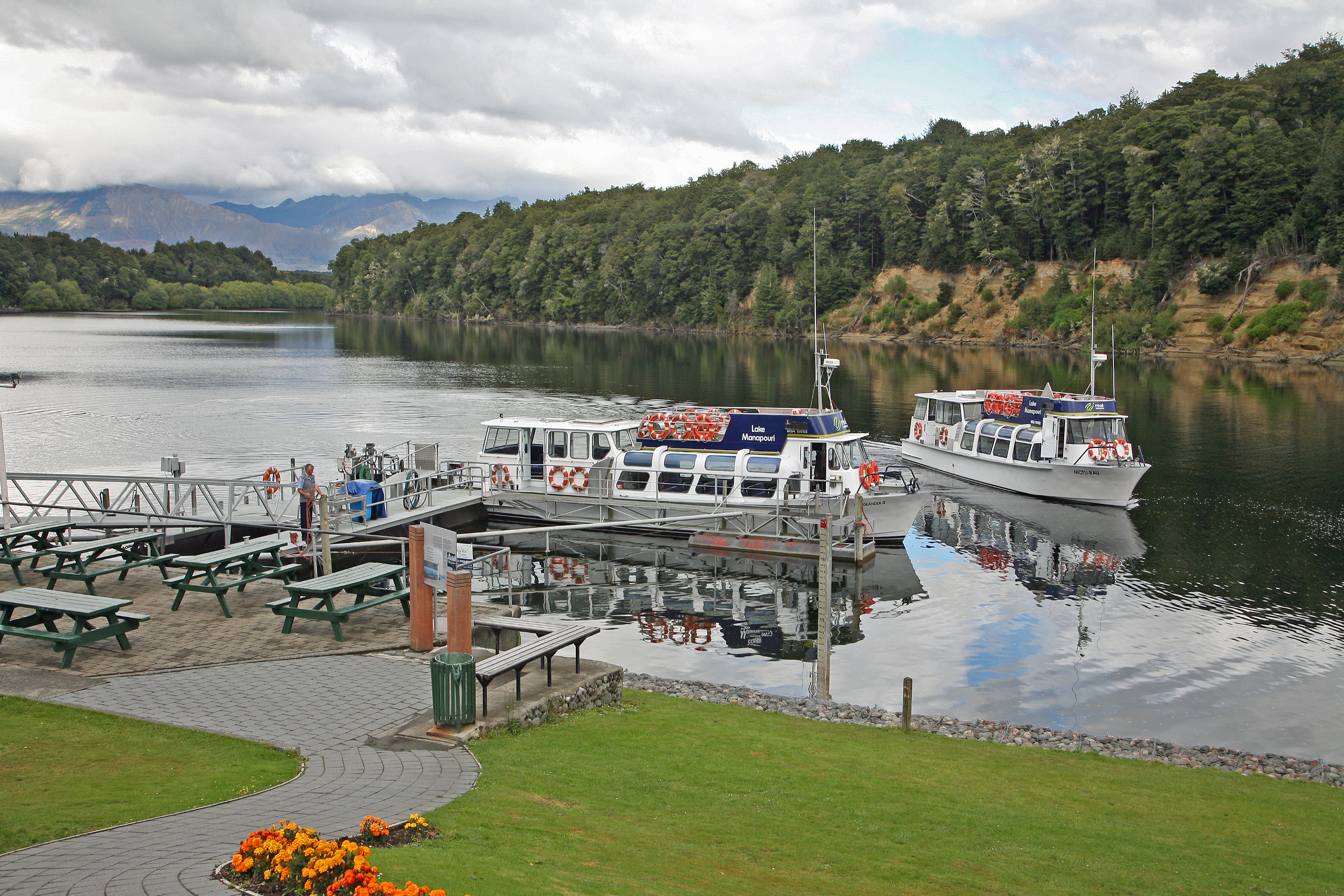
Lake Manapouri

Southland District covers the majority of the land area of Southland Region, although the region also covers Gore District, Invercargill City and adjacent territorial waters. It has a land area of 29,574.53 square kilometres (11,419 sq mi), excluding inland waters such as Lake Te Anau, Lake Manapouri, and Lake Hauroko.

Southland District contains the islands south of Foveaux Strait:

- Solander Islands
- Stewart Island
- Ruapuke Island

The seat of the district council is Invercargill, which, however, is not part of Southland District, but a territorial authority in its own right.

Two of New Zealand's largest national parks are within the boundaries of Southland District: Fiordland National Park, and Rakiura National Park (which covers most of Stewart Island / Rakiura).

=== Urban areas and settlements ===
The Southland District has three towns with a population over 1,000. Together, they are home to 21.2% of the district's population.

Urban area	Population (June 2025)	% of district
Te Anau	2,920	8.6%
Winton	2,560	7.6%
Riverton	1,700	5.0%

Other settlements and localities in the district include:

==== Mararoa Waimea Ward ====
- Five Rivers Area:
  - Athol
  - Castlerock
  - Eyre Creek
  - Fairlight
  - Five Rivers
  - Garston
  - Josephville
  - Lowther
  - Lumsden
  - Mossburn
  - Nokomai
  - Parawa
  - Saint Patricks
- Te Anau Area:
  - Cascade Creek
  - Knobs Flat
  - Manapouri
  - Milford Sound
  - Te Anau
  - The Key
- Waikaia Area:
  - Ardlussa
  - Balfour
  - Kauhoe
  - Riversdale
  - Waikaia
  - Wendon
  - Wendonside

==== Waiau Aparima Ward ====
- Riverton Area:
  - Colac Bay
  - Gummies Bush
  - Orepuki
  - Pahia
  - Riverton/Aparima
  - Thornbury
  - Waipango
- Tuatapere Area:
  - Blackmount
  - Clifden
  - Merrivale
  - Monowai
  - Papatotara
  - Piko Piko
  - Pukemaori
  - Te Tua
  - Te Waewae
  - Tuatapere
- Wallace Area:
  - Drummond
  - Fairfax
  - Isla Bank
  - Nightcaps
  - Ohai
  - Otahuti
  - Otautau
  - Wairio
  - Wreys Bush

==== Waihopai Toetoe Ward ====
- Toetoes Area:
  - Curio Bay
  - Fortification
  - Fortrose
  - Glenham
  - Haldane
  - Mokoreta
  - Niagara
  - Otara
  - Pine Bush
  - Pukewao
  - Quarry Hills
  - Redan
  - Slope Point
  - Titiroa
  - Te Peka
  - Tokanui
  - Waipapa Point
  - Waikawa
  - Waimahaka
  - Wyndham
- Waihopai Area:
  - Ashers
  - Dacre
  - Gorge Road
  - Grove Bush
  - Kapuka
  - Kapuka South
  - Longbush
  - Mabel Bush
  - Mokotua
  - Oteramika
  - Rakahouka
  - Rimu
  - Roslyn Bush
  - Timpanys
  - Woodlands
- Te Tipua Area:
  - Brydone
  - Edendale
  - Glencoe
  - Menzies Ferry
  - Morton Mains
  - Ota Creek
  - Seaward Downs
  - Te Tipua
  - Waitane

==== Oreti Ward ====
- Wallacetown Area:
  - Branxholme
  - Lochiel
  - Makarewa
  - Ryal Bush
  - Spar Bush
  - Tussock Creek
  - Waianiwa
  - Wallacetown
  - Waimatuku
- Winton Area:
  - Benmore
  - Browns
  - Caroline
  - Centre Bush
  - Dipton
  - Dipton West
  - Hedgehope
  - Hokonui
  - Kauana
  - Lady Barkly
  - Limehills
  - Oreti Plains
  - Otapiri
  - South Hillend
  - Springhills
  - Winton

==== Stewart Island-Rakiura Ward ====
- Oban
- Port Pegasus (uninhabited)
- Port William (uninhabited)

== Demographics ==
Southland District covers 29,575.19 km^{2} (11,419.04 sq mi) and had an estimated population of 33,900 as of June 2025, with a population density of 1.1 people per km^{2}.

Historical population
Year	Pop.	±% p.a.
2006	28,437	—
2013	29,613	+0.58%
2018	30,864	+0.83%
2023	31,833	+0.62%

Southland District had a population of 31,833 in the 2023 New Zealand census, an increase of 969 people (3.1%) since the 2018 census, and an increase of 2,220 people (7.5%) since the 2013 census. There were 16,533 males, 15,219 females and 78 people of other genders in 13,371 dwellings. 2.0% of people identified as LGBTIQ+. The median age was 40.3 years (compared with 38.1 years nationally). There were 6,387 people (20.1%) aged under 15 years, 5,025 (15.8%) aged 15 to 29, 14,874 (46.7%) aged 30 to 64, and 5,544 (17.4%) aged 65 or older.

People could identify as more than one ethnicity. The results were 86.3% European (Pākehā); 13.0% Māori; 1.4% Pasifika; 7.6% Asian; 0.8% Middle Eastern, Latin American and African New Zealanders (MELAA); and 3.7% other, which includes people giving their ethnicity as "New Zealander". English was spoken by 97.4%, Māori language by 2.0%, Samoan by 0.2% and other languages by 7.3%. No language could be spoken by 1.9% (e.g. too young to talk). New Zealand Sign Language was known by 0.5%. The percentage of people born overseas was 15.3, compared with 28.8% nationally.

Religious affiliations were 31.8% Christian, 0.5% Hindu, 0.1% Islam, 0.3% Māori religious beliefs, 0.8% Buddhist, 0.3% New Age, and 0.9% other religions. People who answered that they had no religion were 56.7%, and 8.7% of people did not answer the census question.

Of those at least 15 years old, 3,174 (12.5%) people had a bachelor's or higher degree, 14,385 (56.5%) had a post-high school certificate or diploma, and 7,026 (27.6%) people exclusively held high school qualifications. The median income was $44,100, compared with $41,500 nationally. 2,211 people (8.7%) earned over $100,000 compared to 12.1% nationally. The employment status of those at least 15 was that 14,340 (56.4%) people were employed full-time, 3,969 (15.6%) were part-time, and 378 (1.5%) were unemployed.

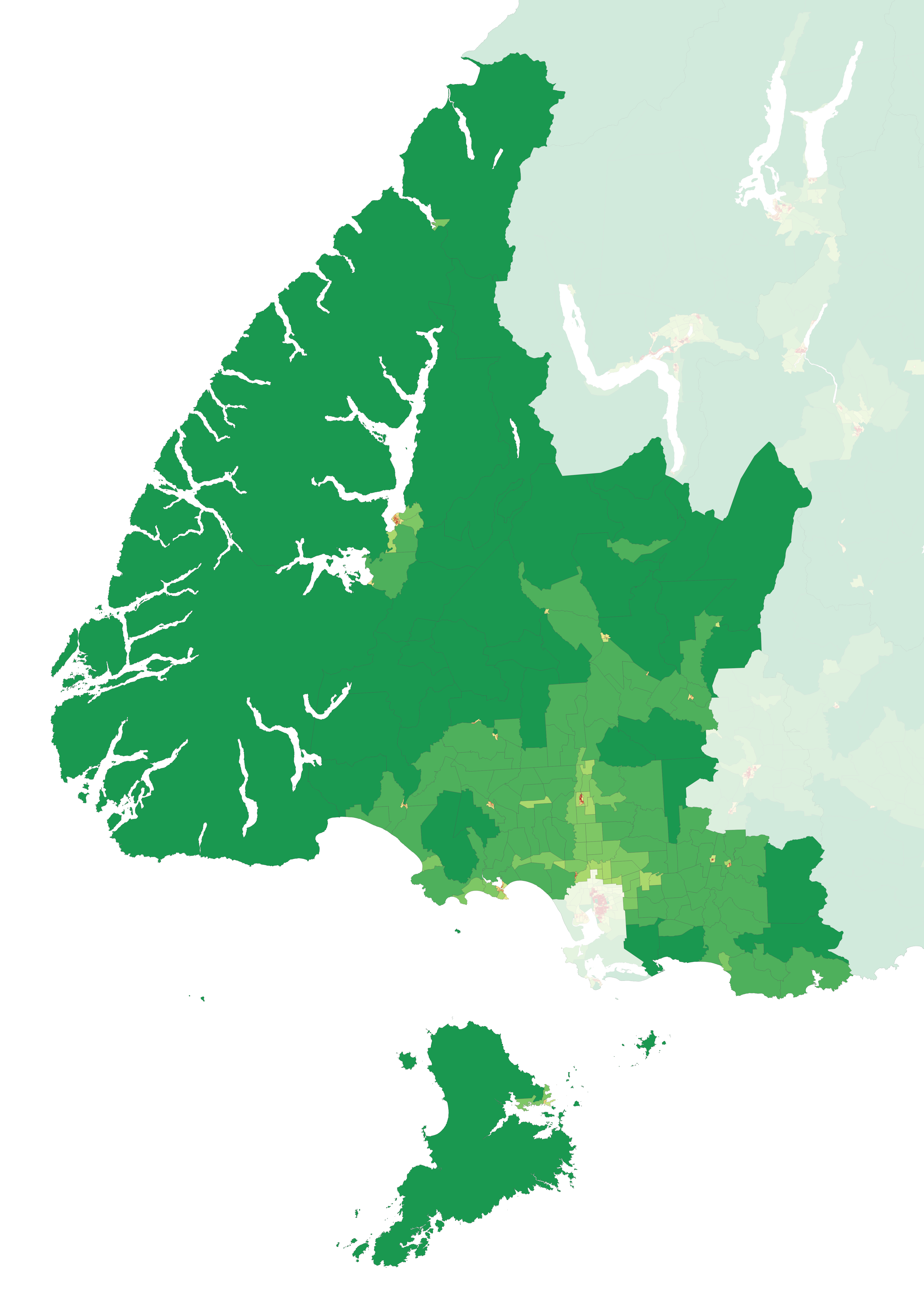
Population density in the 2023 census

Individual wards
Name	Area (km^{2})	Population	Density (per km^{2})	Dwellings	Median age	Median income
Mararoa Waimea Ward	17,419.42	8,319	0.48	3,864	41.0 years	$44,900
Waiau Aparima Ward	6,405.50	8,142	1.27	3,408	41.2 years	$38,500
Oreti Ward	1,641.77	8,559	5.21	3,321	39.6 years	$47,700
Waihopai Toetoe Ward	2,360.78	6,324	2.68	2,481	38.9 years	$46,200
Stewart Island/Rakiura Ward	1,747.72	486	0.28	297	47.4 years	$38,400
New Zealand					38.1 years	$41,500

== Government ==
=== Mayor ===
The current district mayor is Rob Scott. He has held this position since 2022.

=== Council ===
The district council is made up of twelve elected members, from various ward areas, and, like any other local authority, is elected every three years.

== Sister cities ==
=== Current sister city ===
- Cinque Terre, La Spezia, Liguria

=== Former sister city ===
- Wyong Shire, New South Wales

Southland District was a sister city to Wyong Shire in New South Wales, Australia until 2010.

== See also ==
- List of historic places in Southland District
