= Eyre Creek (New Zealand) =

River in Southland Region, New Zealand

Coordinates: 45°31′40″S 168°33′33″E

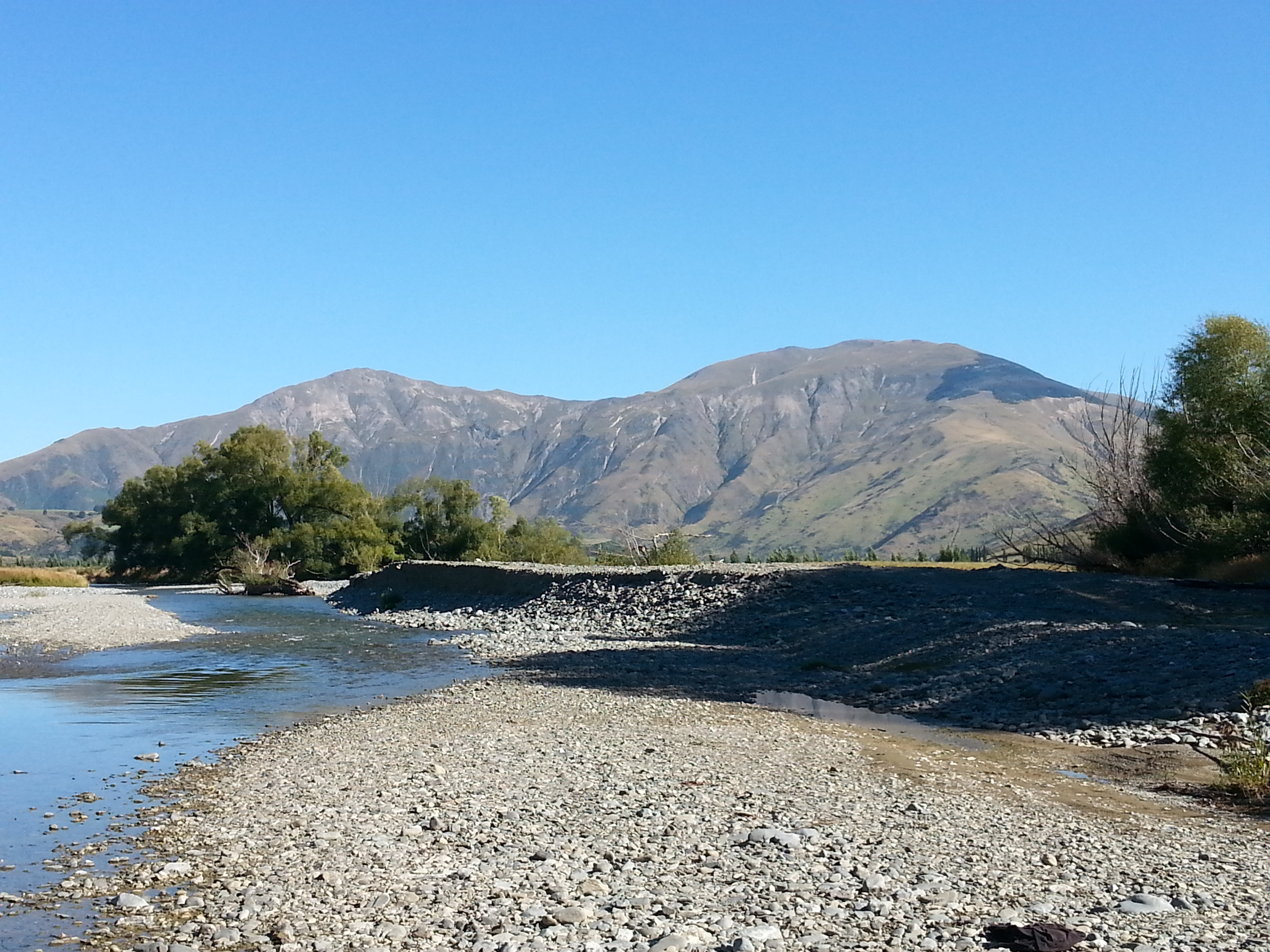
The Eyre Creek with the Mid Dome in the background

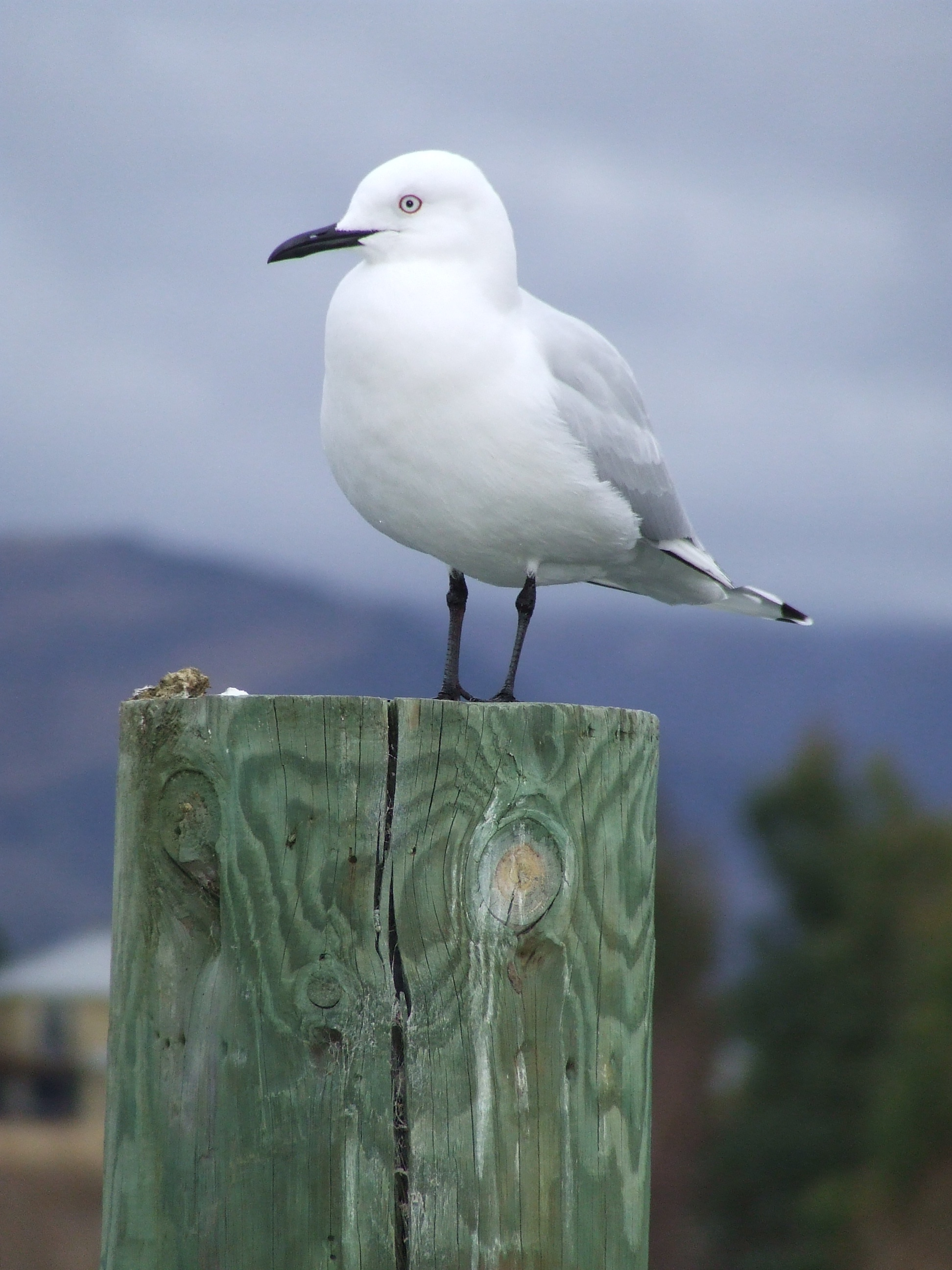
Black-billed gull

The Eyre Creek is a river in the Southland region of New Zealand's South Island. It is a tributary of the Mataura River with a braided channel and with its confluence near the small town of Athol. It rises on the eastern side of Jane Peak in the Eyre Mountains south-west of Lake Wakatipu. It has been identified as an Important Bird Area by BirdLife International because it supports breeding colonies of the endangered black-billed gull. West of Athol it is crossed by State Highway 6 and the Around the Mountains Cycle Trail.
