= Garston, New Zealand =

Garston
- Town
- Location within New Zealand
- Coordinates: 45°28′9″S 168°41′0″E
- Country: New Zealand
- Region: Southland
- Territorial authority: Southland
- Time zone: UTC+12 (New Zealand Standard Time)
  - Summer (DST): UTC+13 (New Zealand Daylight Time)
- Postcode: 9793
- Local iwi: Ngāi Tahu

Garston is a small settlement in northern Southland, in the South Island of New Zealand, located close to the region's boundary with Otago. It is the most inland settlement in New Zealand. It is situated south of Lake Wakatipu and close to the upper reaches of the Mataura River, between Kingston and Lumsden. Garston is connected to both Kingston and Lumsden by SH 6.

Garston is notable for its trout fishing and ice skating. Local attractions include the Garston Pub and recently developed mountain biking track. The Around the Mountains Cycle Trail passes through the town.

== Education ==
Garston School is a contributing primary school for years 1 to 6 with a roll of 75 as of July 2026. It opened about 1882.
