= St Peter's College, Gore =

St Peter's College
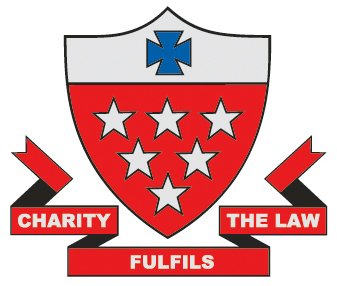

Location
- 121 Kakapo Street, Gore, New Zealand; 46.1072°S 168.9245°E

Information
- Type: Co-educational, Secondary (Year 7–13) with boarding facilities
- Motto: Charity Fulfils the Law
- Established: 1969; 57 years ago
- Ministry of Education Institution no.: 397
- Principal: Kieran Udy
- Enrolment: 350 (July 2026)
- Socio-economic decile: 8P
- Website: stpetersgore.school.nz

St Peters College is an integrated state secondary school in Gore, Southland, New Zealand. It was founded in 1969 as a private co-ed school and was the first Catholic co-educational boarding school established in New Zealand. It was staffed by the Rosminian Order (the Institute of Charity) and the Sisters of Mercy.

== Academic ==
The college is one of the highest ranking in the southern region. In 2004 and 2006 the school was the highest achieving in Southland, according to NCEA results.

== College Houses ==
The school has four houses which divide the students into groups for events such as athletics, swimming, cultural and community events. They are: McAuley (blue), Rosmini (yellow), Finlay (green) and Pompallier (red). Mother Catherine McAuley was the founder of the Sisters of Mercy. Antonio Rosmini was the founder of the Rosminians. Monsignor Finlay was the parish priest of Gore who inspired, and laboured unceasingly towards, the building of the college and Bishop Pompallier was the founder of the Catholic Church in New Zealand. The college has a tradition of keeping the same house in family groups.

== Principals ==
- Father L Hurdidge IC (1969–1973)
- Father J Michael Hill IC (1935–2023) (Headmaster 1974–1979)
- Father E J Willett IC (1980–1983)
- Mr Kerry Henderson (1984–1990)
- Mr John Boyce
- Mr Martin Chamberlain
- Mr Jon Hogue
- Mrs Kate Nicholson (-2019)
- Mrs Tara Quinney (2020–2024)
- Mr Kieran Udy (2025–present)

== History ==
=== Early days ===
The idea of a Catholic secondary school in Gore was that of long-serving parish priest (1947–1972), Father (later Monsignor) Finlay. The 30-acre (12 hectare) site of the college was gradually purchased during the 1950s and 1960s and appeals were launched for funds in those decades for the construction of the school. In 1961, the Capuchin Fathers undertook to provide the staff and they became involved in the fund-raising activities in Gore. The first building work commenced with the object of opening the school in 1964. However, after the completion of the staff house and one dormitory, the Capuchins withdrew from the project. Fund-raising continued and in 1965 the Rosminians committed themselves to staff the school. The "advance guard" of Rosminians, Father S Marriott and Brother J Tedesco arrived and they worked with the "central committee" on the fund-raising project. A classroom block was built.

In 1968 Father L Hurdidge was appointed Headmaster. At the time of his appointment he was Deputy Head at St Gregory's College, Huddersfield which was a co-educational school. From the beginning of the project it was assumed that the Gore school would be boys-only but at the time of Father Hurdidge's appointment it was evident that it should be co-educational. His experience in Huddersfield was relevant to the decision to do this. The name of the School, St Peter's, was adopted and it was agreed that it would be staffed by the Sisters of Mercy and the Rosminians. The college was opened by Bishop Kavanagh of Dunedin on 26 January 1969, commencing with classes Form 1–3 (Years 7–9). The first staff consisted of: Fathers L Herdidge (Headmaster), J Buckner, B Hogan, Brothers J Tedesco, E Willett, J Wallace, Sisters Mary David (Senior Mistress), Mary Fidelus and Mary Stephena. Some of the Rosminians came from Rosmini College, Takapuna. The science block was completed soon after the school opened and later a gymnasium and two technical blocks were added. It was decided to build only one of the three proposed dormitory blocks, "Rosmini House", but a house bought on land in Kakapo Street opposite the school was renovated as a hostel for senior boys. It was named St Paul's Without the Walls and known as St Paul's.

=== Chapel ===
The school chapel, built to an interesting and unusual design conducive to a prayerful atmosphere of peace and serenity, was opened in 1978. One important personality in the early years of the school was Brother Tedesco ("Brother Ted"). He was in charge of St Paul's and his service to the wider community included being elected to the Gore Borough Council. The Rosminians also took up some parish duties in the wider area. Fathers Kearns and Moynihan were successively parish priests of Mataura. The school became a State-integrated school on 1 February 1982. The school is now completely lay-staffed.

=== Challenges ===
During the 2023 southern New Zealand floods on 21 September, the college campus sustained significant flooding including damage to its carpets. All but two of the school's ground floors were inundated by floodwater. In 2023 and 2024, St Peters went through a period of limited statutory management under the Education and Training Act 2020.

=== Day school ===
The college had two boarding houses. They were: Tedesco (orange) and Buckner (purple). Brother Tedesco (Brother Ted) was an important member of the original staff of the college (see above). Father Buckner was a staff member of St Peter's College. Later there was just one hostel for boys and girls, "Rosmini house". This hostel was operated by an independent charitable trust which provided accommodation for boarders from both St Peter's and Māruawai College (formerly called Gore High School) (whose own hostel was demolished in 2017). Rosmini House hostel closed down at the end of the 2024 school year. After 55 years of its existence, St Peter's ceased to be a boarding school. The hostel facility, which is located on the school grounds, was used for other purposes by the college. In 2025 the principal indicated that the hostel could be reopened but that it would have to be substantially upgraded first.

== Notable alumni ==
- Tori Peeters - (aka Victoria Peeters) (born 1994), champion and olympian javelin thrower
- Mike Puru – TV and radio personality at The Edge
- Hayley Saunders – Southern Steel netball player
- Matt Saunders – North Otago, Otago, Southland Stags and Highlanders rugby union player

.

== See also ==
- Gore High School
