= Mid Dome =

- Location within New Zealand

Highest point
- Elevation: 1,478 m (4,849 ft)
- Coordinates: 45°35′06″S 168°32′15″E

Geography
- Location: South Island, New Zealand

Mid Dome is a prominent mountain in the northern Southland region that overlooks the township of Five Rivers and the Waimea Plain. It rises to a height of 1,478 metres (4,849 ft). Surrounding farms at the base of the mountain make up the original Dome (later East Dome) station which lies to the west of the Mid Dome. Mid Dome stands above the upper reaches of the Mataura River, some 7 km south of the township of Athol.

== Ecological Experiments at Mid Dome ==
Mid Dome was the source of an experiment during the late 1960s to confront the effects of ongoing land erosion. In an attempt to reduce erosion wilding pines were planted. The solution was effective, with the pines spreading quickly over the western slopes of the mountain. In the early 1990s, however, it was noted that the pines were spreading beyond control and efforts have been made since that time to try to control them. Aerial spraying of the pines has been undertaken and has successfully reduced the area covered by the pines.

== Climate ==
Climate data for Mid Dome (1949–1976)
Month	Jan	Feb	Mar	Apr	May	Jun	Jul	Aug	Sep	Oct	Nov	Dec	Year
Record high °C (°F)	36.5 (97.7)	32.2 (90.0)	32.1 (89.8)	26.1 (79.0)	21.0 (69.8)	18.9 (66.0)	18.1 (64.6)	19.1 (66.4)	21.7 (71.1)	24.2 (75.6)	28.9 (84.0)	29.4 (84.9)	36.5 (97.7)
Mean daily maximum °C (°F)	21.1 (70.0)	21.2 (70.2)	18.8 (65.8)	15.4 (59.7)	12.2 (54.0)	8.5 (47.3)	8.2 (46.8)	10.3 (50.5)	13.4 (56.1)	15.9 (60.6)	17.5 (63.5)	19.6 (67.3)	15.2 (59.3)
Daily mean °C (°F)	14.8 (58.6)	14.8 (58.6)	12.9 (55.2)	10.1 (50.2)	7.2 (45.0)	4.1 (39.4)	3.6 (38.5)	5.2 (41.4)	7.9 (46.2)	10.2 (50.4)	11.8 (53.2)	13.5 (56.3)	9.7 (49.4)
Mean daily minimum °C (°F)	8.5 (47.3)	8.4 (47.1)	7.1 (44.8)	4.7 (40.5)	2.1 (35.8)	−0.4 (31.3)	−1.1 (30.0)	0.2 (32.4)	2.3 (36.1)	4.6 (40.3)	6.0 (42.8)	7.4 (45.3)	4.1 (39.5)
Record low °C (°F)	−4.0 (24.8)	−1.5 (29.3)	−3.4 (25.9)	−7.4 (18.7)	−7.1 (19.2)	−8.3 (17.1)	−10.0 (14.0)	−11.1 (12.0)	−11.6 (11.1)	−6.1 (21.0)	−2.5 (27.5)	−3.5 (25.7)	−11.6 (11.1)
Average rainfall mm (inches)	88.4 (3.48)	68.8 (2.71)	100.3 (3.95)	84.5 (3.33)	88.4 (3.48)	94.2 (3.71)	81.6 (3.21)	67.4 (2.65)	63.4 (2.50)	79.8 (3.14)	81.2 (3.20)	80.9 (3.19)	978.9 (38.55)
Source: NIWA
