= Wilding conifer =

Invasive trees in New Zealand

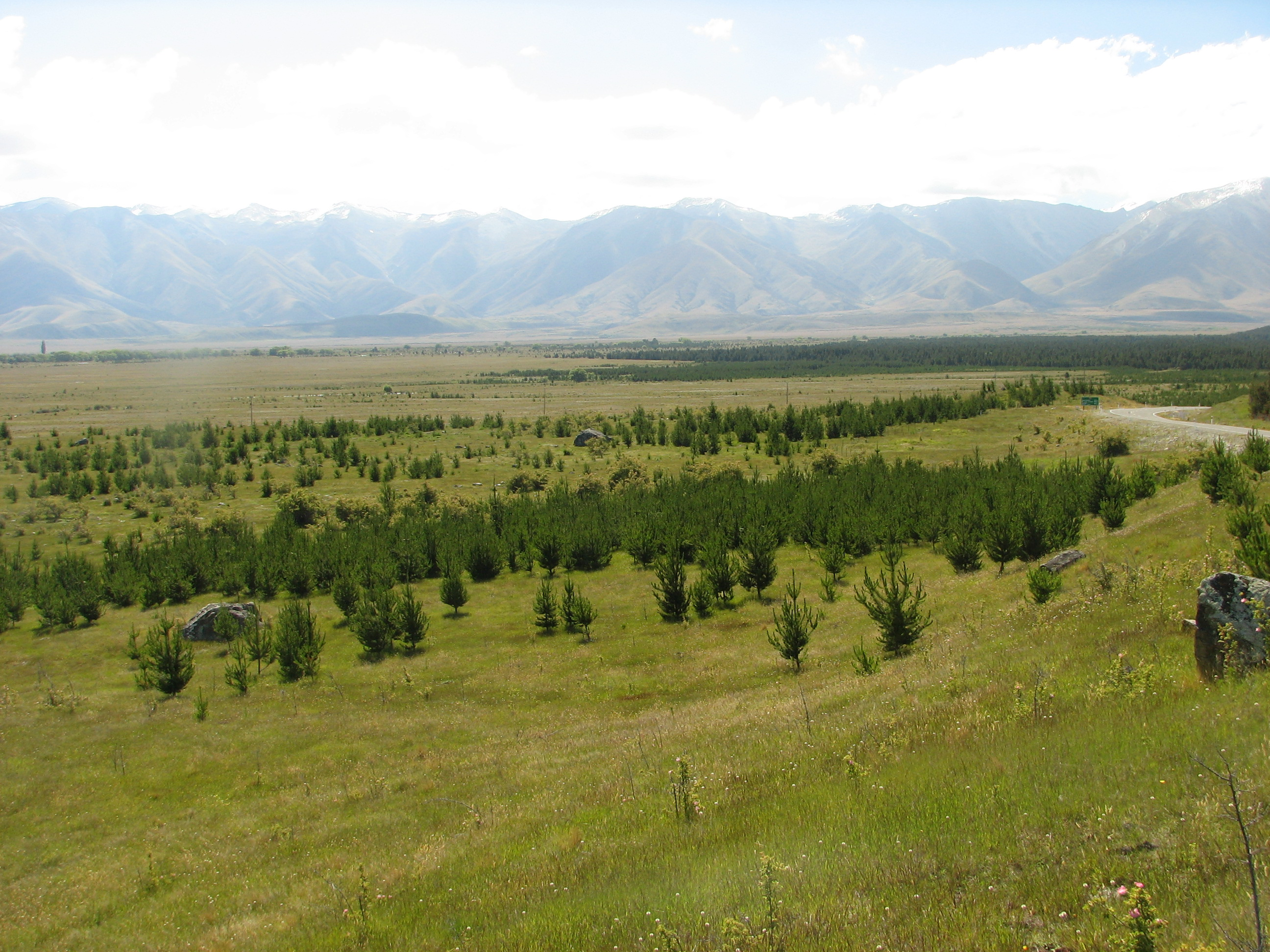
Wilding pines in the Canterbury region.

Wilding conifers, commonly known as wilding pines, are invasive trees in the high country of New Zealand. Millions of dollars are spent on controlling their spread.

In the South Island, they threaten 210,000 hectares of public land administered by the Department of Conservation. They are also present on privately owned land and other public land such as roadsides. The wilding conifers are considered to be a threat to biodiversity, farm productivity and to landscape values. Since they often invade tussock grasslands – which are characterised by low-lying vegetation that is considered to be a natural environment – the tall trees become a prominent and unwanted feature.

== Species ==
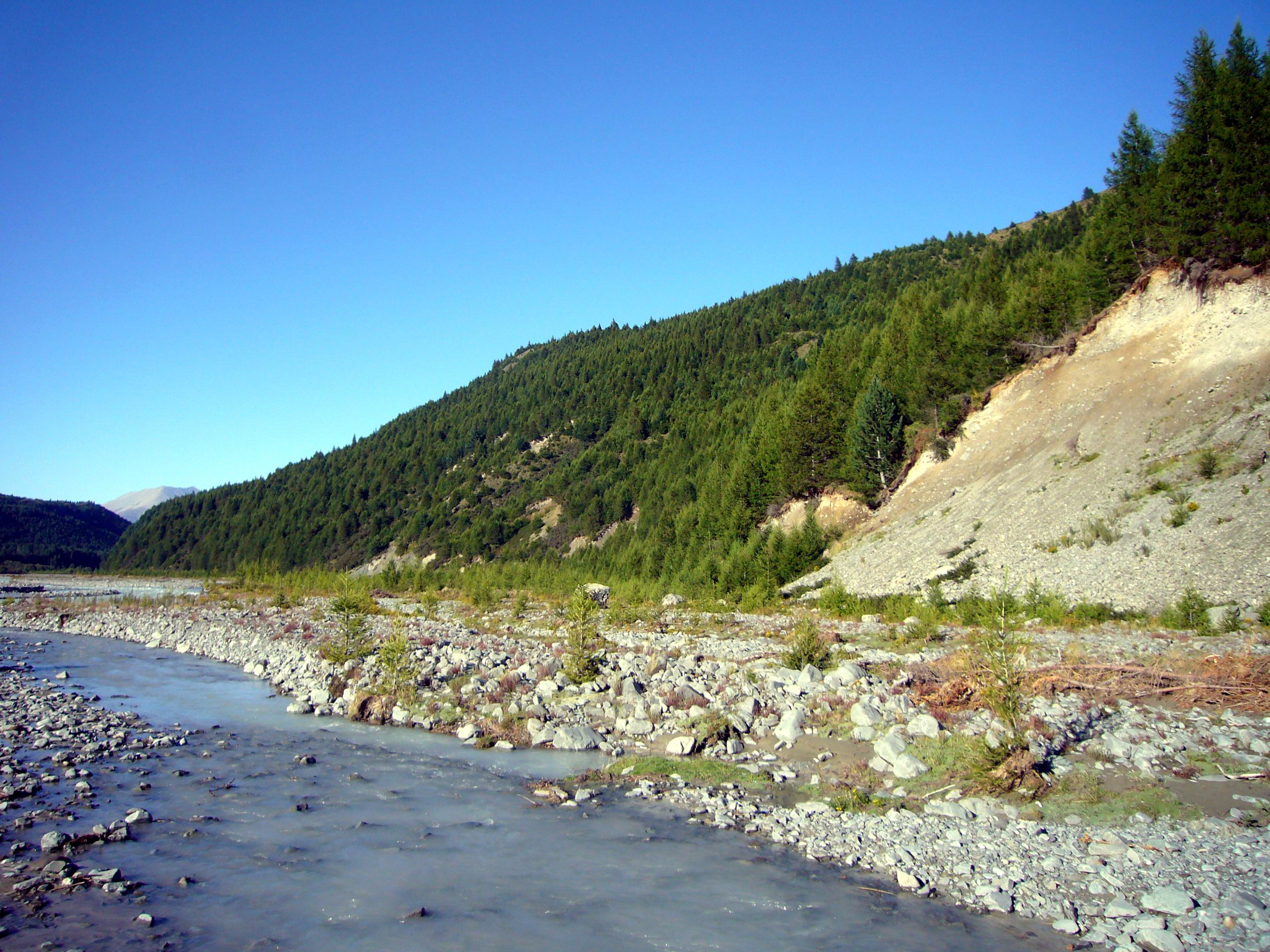
European larch and other invasive conifers in the Jollie River. The trees have almost completely blanketed the flanks of the lower section of the valley.

There are ten main species that have become wildings:

- Bishop pine (Pinus muricata)
- Corsican pine (Pinus nigra)
- Dwarf mountain pine (Pinus mugo)
- Lodgepole pine (Pinus contorta)
- Maritime pine (Pinus pinaster)
- Ponderosa pine (Pinus ponderosa)
- Radiata pine (Monterey pine, Pinus radiata)
- Scots pine (Pinus sylvestris)
- Douglas fir (Pseudotsuga species)
- European larch (Larix decidua)

The various species dominate in different areas of New Zealand. Radiata pine (Pinus radiata) is used for 90% of the plantation forests in New Zealand and some of the wilding conifers are a result of these forests.

== Control measures ==
Without any control measures, wilding conifers will spread over an increasing area with economic and environmental consequences. As well as volunteers organised by environmental groups, regional councils and the Department of Conservation invest in wild conifer removal.

A South Island Wilding Conifer Management Group was formed in 2006 and obtained funding from the Ministry of Agriculture and Forestry Sustainable Farming Fund.

Mechanical removal by hand pulling seedlings, and the use of brush cutters and chainsaws are common control methods. Spray trials are also being carried out. In 2004 a spraying operation by the Department of Conservation at Mid Dome in the Southland region caused spray drift onto surrounding areas including the towns of Athol and Kingston.

== By region ==
Locations of major wilding conifer areas. Adapted from Wilding conifers – New Zealand history and research background.

Pest management is administered by regional councils. There are sixteen different regions in New Zealand and wilding conifers only occur in a few of these regions, predominantly in the South Island. The Department of Conservation manages wilding conifers on public land under its jurisdiction.

=== Canterbury ===
In its 2005 Pest Management Strategy the Canterbury Regional Council (Ecan) has the objective of eradicating all self-sown wilding conifers in ecologically sensitive areas in its jurisdiction. To do this a range of measures are used, including carrying out wilding conifer control operations, encouraging reporting of the presence of wilding conifers, encouraging the removal of seed sources and advocating changes to the district plans of the territorial authorities to prevent or control the planting of inappropriate conifers.

=== Hawke's Bay ===
Wilding conifers infest the Kaweka Forest Park.

=== Marlborough ===
Pinus contorta infests the south Marlborough area and is classed as a "Containment Control Pest", which are pests that are managed to prevent spreading to new areas. Other wilding species exist in Marlborough but Lodgepole Pine is the focus for pest management.

=== Otago ===
Pinus contorta is a pest plant listed in the Otago Regional Council Pest Management Strategy for Otago.

=== Southland ===
A major area of wilding conifer spread is in the Mid Dome Area in the Southland region. The Mid Dome Wilding Trees Charitable Trust was set up in 2006 and in 2008 the government allocated $54,000 from the Biodiversity Funds to control wildings on about 1,000 hectares (2,500 acres) in the area.

== See also ==
- Forestry in New Zealand
- Invasive species in New Zealand
