= Nevis River =

River in New Zealand

Coordinates: 45°04′S 169°02′E

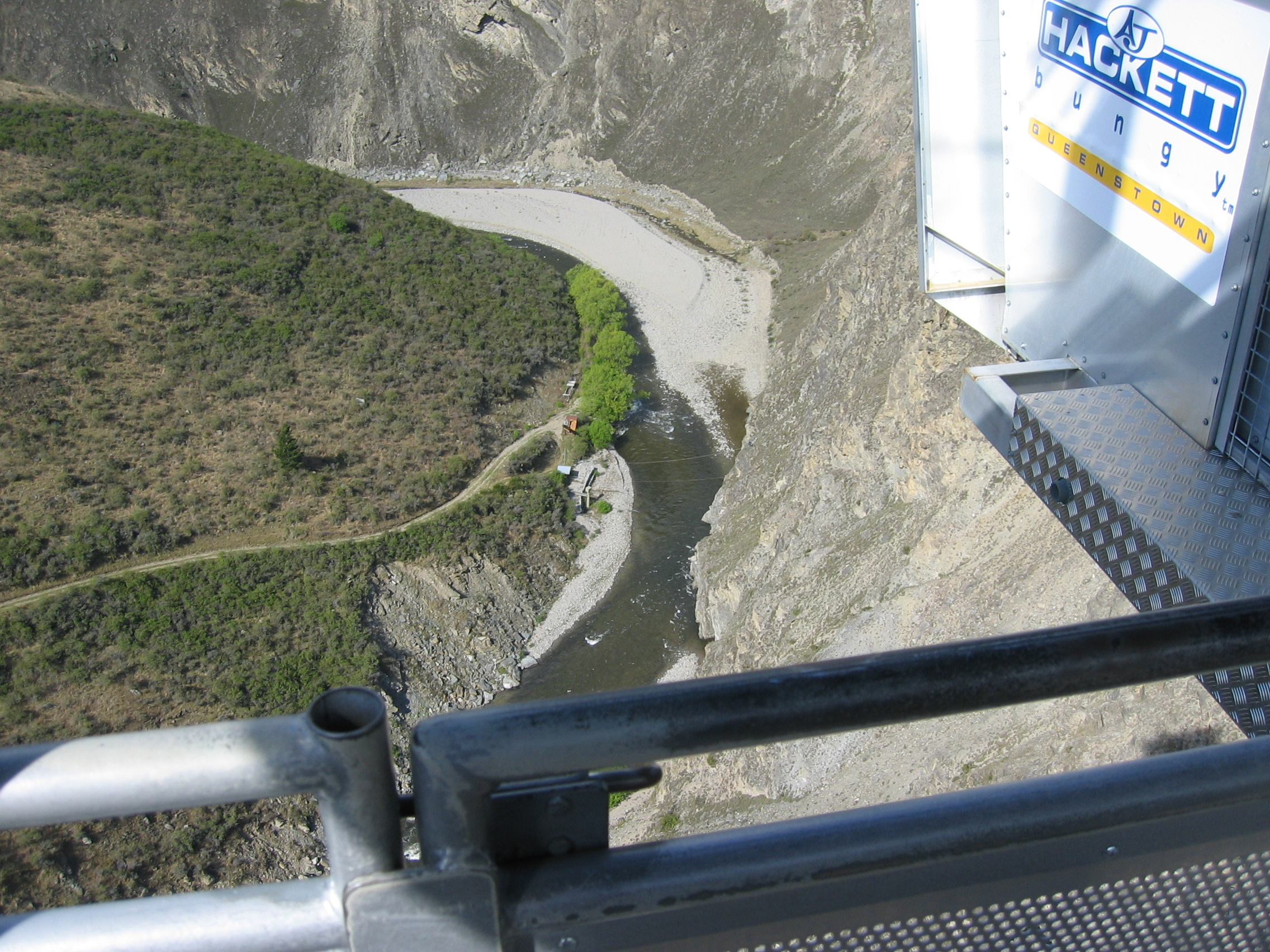
Nevis River from Nevis bungy platform

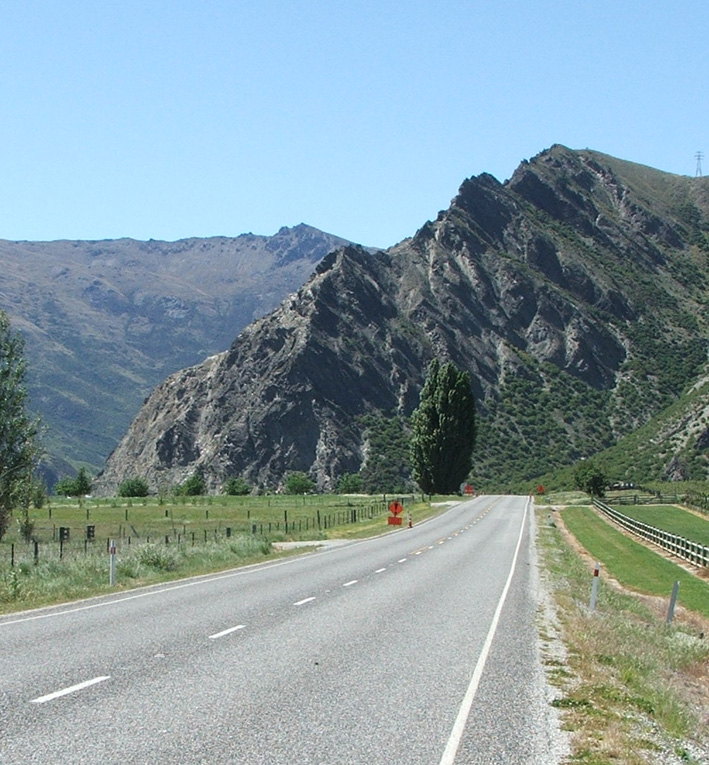
Nevis Bluff as seen from SH 6

The Nevis River is in Otago, New Zealand. It flows north for 40 kilometres (25 mi) through rough country before meeting the Kawarau River, of which it is a tributary. A prominent rock outcrop close to this junction is known as the Nevis Bluff.

== Etymology ==
The river was named by Donald Angus Cameron.

== History ==
The river was one of the sites of the Otago gold rush of the 1860s. Today, the region around the river is known for tourism and wine production. New Zealand's highest bungy jumping operation, the 134-metre (440 ft) Nevis Highwire is above the river.

A Water Conservation Order protects the river for its wild and scenic character and for recreational use, especially fishing and kayaking. The Water Conservation Order made provision for damming the river for hydro-electric development. Fish and Game New Zealand applied to have this provision revoked and in 2013, after a public process with consideration by a special tribunal and the Environment Court, the Environment Minister decided to prevent damming of the river.

Nokomai patterned mire, in the upper catchment, is part of a relatively unmodified wetland on several square kilometres of the southern Garvie Mountains. It is possibly the largest such area in Australasia and is dominated by grasses, sedges and mosses, with shallow pools, small islands and clumps of low vegetation. The mire drains north via Roaring Lion Creek to the Nevis and south via Dome Burn to the Waikaia River. A small part of the mire is in the Nokomai catchment.
