= Waikaia River =

River in New Zealand

Coordinates: 45°53′S 168°48′E

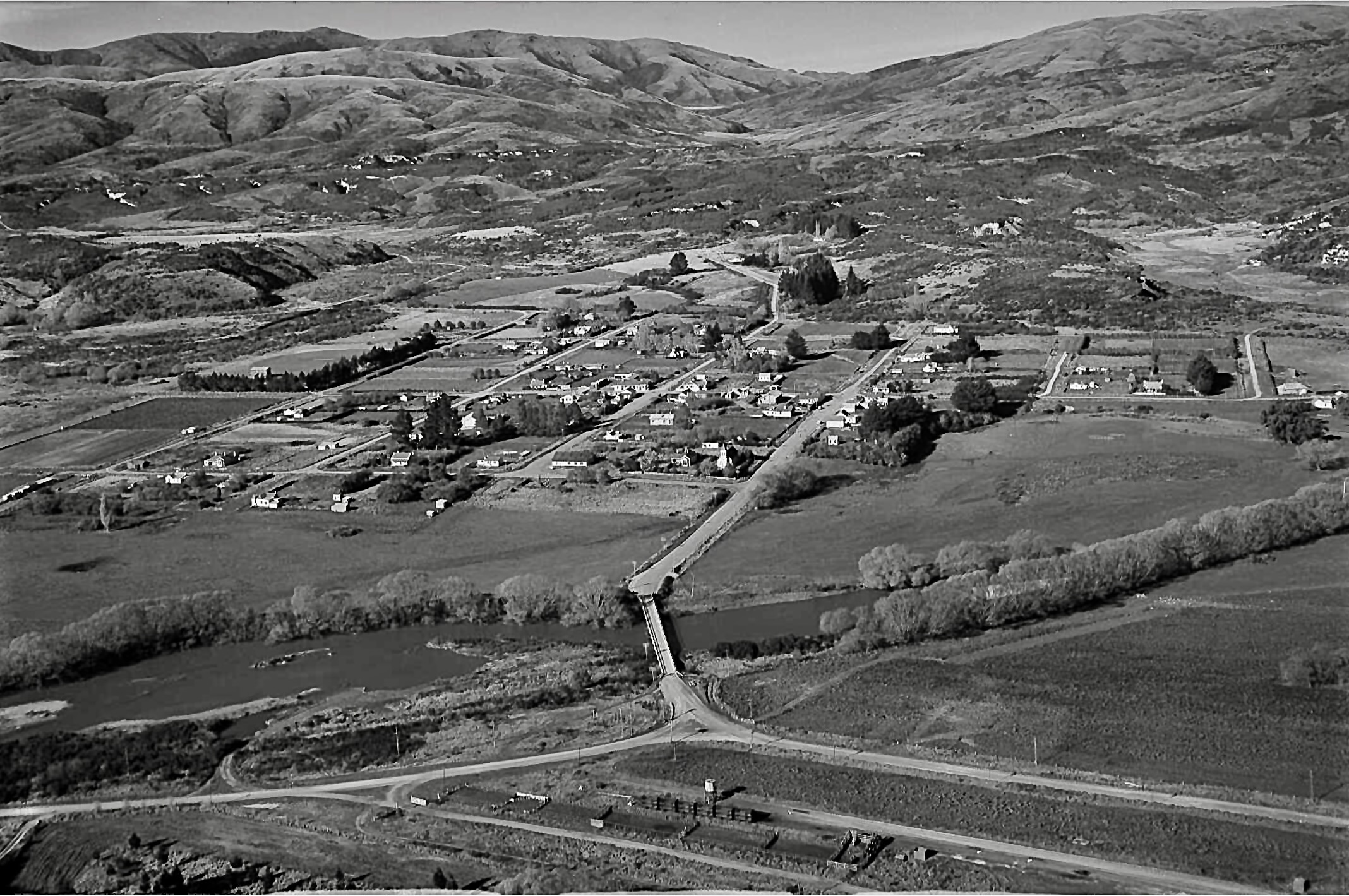
- Waikaia and Waikaia River in 1955

Location
- Country: New Zealand

Physical characteristics
- Source
  - location: Old Woman Range
  - elevation: 1,749 metres (5,738 ft)
- Mouth
  - location: Mataura River
  - elevation: 120 metres (390 ft)
- Length: 95 kilometres (59 mi) including Waikaia East River branch
- Basin size: 1,830 square kilometres (710 sq mi)
- Discharge
  - average: 24.41 cubic metres per second (862 cu ft/s)

The Waikaia River is a river in New Zealand, a tributary of the Mataura River. The name is probably a corruption of Wai-o-Whakaea.

The moderate sized Waikaia River rises in swamps and tussock land in the Umbrella Mountains to the east of the headwaters of the Pomahaka River and then flows south for 50 kilometres (31 mi) through rugged native bush-clad hills and then from Piano Flat through farmed areas until it joins the Mataura River at Riversdale. Much of the upper valley is in beech forest. Below Piano Flat the river meanders across a floodplain, much of it irrigated for dairy farming. Total nitrogen concentration in the lower river is 0.47g/m3.

Its tributaries include Gow Burn, Steeple Burn, Dome Burn, Winding Creek and Argyle Burn with the Dome Burn and Steeple Burn being brown trout spawning streams for the Mataura River system.

Nokomai patterned mire, in the upper catchment, is part of a relatively unmodified wetland on several square kilometres of the southern Garvie Mountains. It is possibly the largest such area in Australasia and is dominated by grasses, sedges and mosses, with shallow pools, small islands and clumps of low vegetation. The mire drains south via Dome Burn to the Waikaia and north via Roaring Lion Creek to the Nevis River. A small part of the mire is in the Nokomai catchment.

Highly regarded as a brown trout fishery, the quality of the water in its lower reaches deteriorated in the early 21st century due to the conversion of much of the surrounding farmland to intensive dairy farming.

Gold was dredged from beside the river at Freshford (south of Waikaia) until 2019. An application to mine at Winding Creek (east of Waikaia and scene of an 1863 gold rush) was made in 2021. Other mines, mostly also to the east of Waikaia, have worked gold derived from Cretaceous orogenic deposits in Mesozoic Otago Schist. It was eroded out of the Old Man Range / Kopuwai, after it started rising in the Miocene period, and was then washed out to the alluvial flats. By 1909 the area had 16 dredges working.

== See also ==
- List of rivers of New Zealand
