= Parawa =

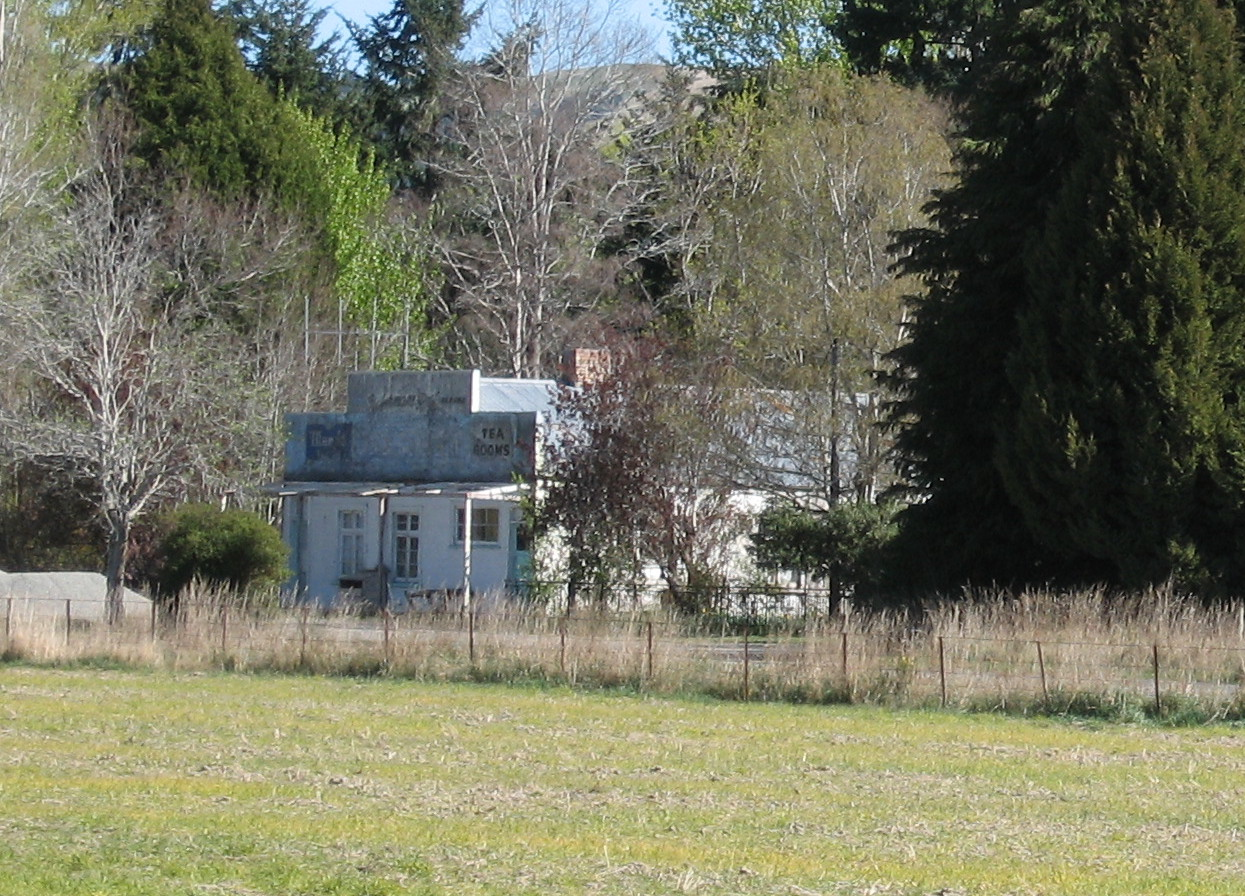
- The Parawa Junction Hotel in September 2009

- Location within New Zealand
- Coordinates: 45°32′S 168°32′E
- Country: New Zealand
- Island: South Island
- Region: Southland region
- Territorial authority: Southland District
- Time zone: UTC+12 (NZST)
  - Summer (DST): UTC+13 (NZDT)
- Postcode(s): 9793
- Area code: 03
- Local iwi: Ngāi Tahu

Parawa is a locality in Southland, New Zealand, on State Highway 6, 5 km southwest of Athol and immediately north of Mid Dome mountain. Its name is a corruption of Paiherewao, the Māori name for the mountain. In the 19th century, several versions of the name were used, including Parrawa and Parrowa.

The Parawa Junction Hotel was built in 1867, near where the main road crosses the Parawa Creek, to service traffic from the south coast to the central Otago goldfields and nearby goldfield at Nokomai. The hotel operated for a century, then was a tearoom for a number of years before closing.

The Kingston Branch railway opened through the district in January 1878, and soon after a Parawa siding was built. It operated until the closure of the line in November 1979. For many years Parawa was known for its very small post office, which was open from 1904–1985.

Before the First World War, a flax mill owned by I. W. Raymond & Co. operated near the entrance to the Nokomai Gorge. In 1904 it employed around 20 people.

== Climate ==
Climate data for Parawa (Mid Dome) (1949–1976)
Month	Jan	Feb	Mar	Apr	May	Jun	Jul	Aug	Sep	Oct	Nov	Dec	Year
Record high °C (°F)	36.5 (97.7)	32.2 (90.0)	32.1 (89.8)	26.1 (79.0)	21.0 (69.8)	18.9 (66.0)	18.1 (64.6)	19.1 (66.4)	21.7 (71.1)	24.2 (75.6)	28.9 (84.0)	29.4 (84.9)	36.5 (97.7)
Mean daily maximum °C (°F)	21.1 (70.0)	21.2 (70.2)	18.8 (65.8)	15.4 (59.7)	12.2 (54.0)	8.5 (47.3)	8.2 (46.8)	10.3 (50.5)	13.4 (56.1)	15.9 (60.6)	17.5 (63.5)	19.6 (67.3)	15.2 (59.3)
Daily mean °C (°F)	14.8 (58.6)	14.8 (58.6)	12.9 (55.2)	10.1 (50.2)	7.2 (45.0)	4.1 (39.4)	3.6 (38.5)	5.2 (41.4)	7.9 (46.2)	10.2 (50.4)	11.8 (53.2)	13.5 (56.3)	9.7 (49.4)
Mean daily minimum °C (°F)	8.5 (47.3)	8.4 (47.1)	7.1 (44.8)	4.7 (40.5)	2.1 (35.8)	−0.4 (31.3)	−1.1 (30.0)	0.2 (32.4)	2.3 (36.1)	4.6 (40.3)	6.0 (42.8)	7.4 (45.3)	4.1 (39.5)
Record low °C (°F)	−4.0 (24.8)	−1.5 (29.3)	−3.4 (25.9)	−7.4 (18.7)	−7.1 (19.2)	−8.3 (17.1)	−10.0 (14.0)	−11.1 (12.0)	−11.6 (11.1)	−6.1 (21.0)	−2.5 (27.5)	−3.5 (25.7)	−11.6 (11.1)
Average rainfall mm (inches)	88.4 (3.48)	68.8 (2.71)	100.3 (3.95)	84.5 (3.33)	88.4 (3.48)	94.2 (3.71)	81.6 (3.21)	67.4 (2.65)	63.4 (2.50)	79.8 (3.14)	81.2 (3.20)	80.9 (3.19)	978.9 (38.55)
Source: NIWA
