= Hokonui, New Zealand =

Hokonui
- Location within New Zealand
- Country: New Zealand
- Island: South Island
- Region: Southland
- Territorial authority: Southland District

Population
  - Total: 3,087
- Time zone: UTC+12 (NZST)
  - Summer (DST): UTC+13 (NZDT)

Hokonui is a rural locality in Southland District in the Southland region of the South Island of New Zealand. It is at the foot of the Hokonui Hills, and located on the headwaters of the Makarewa River. The 2013 census recorded the town's population as 3,087.

== Climate ==
Climate data for Hokonui Forest (1981–2010 normals, extremes 1951–1987)
Month	Jan	Feb	Mar	Apr	May	Jun	Jul	Aug	Sep	Oct	Nov	Dec	Year
Record high °C (°F)	34.4 (93.9)	32.2 (90.0)	30.5 (86.9)	26.5 (79.7)	21.9 (71.4)	18.3 (64.9)	16.7 (62.1)	21.1 (70.0)	22.2 (72.0)	25.6 (78.1)	29.1 (84.4)	30.0 (86.0)	34.4 (93.9)
Mean daily maximum °C (°F)	20.1 (68.2)	20.1 (68.2)	18.3 (64.9)	15.7 (60.3)	12.6 (54.7)	9.8 (49.6)	9.5 (49.1)	11.4 (52.5)	13.7 (56.7)	15.4 (59.7)	17.1 (62.8)	19.0 (66.2)	15.2 (59.4)
Daily mean °C (°F)	14.7 (58.5)	14.4 (57.9)	12.7 (54.9)	10.6 (51.1)	8.1 (46.6)	5.7 (42.3)	5.2 (41.4)	6.6 (43.9)	8.6 (47.5)	10.2 (50.4)	11.7 (53.1)	13.5 (56.3)	10.2 (50.3)
Mean daily minimum °C (°F)	9.4 (48.9)	8.8 (47.8)	7.0 (44.6)	5.6 (42.1)	3.6 (38.5)	1.6 (34.9)	0.9 (33.6)	1.9 (35.4)	3.6 (38.5)	4.9 (40.8)	6.3 (43.3)	8.1 (46.6)	5.1 (41.3)
Record low °C (°F)	−1.1 (30.0)	−1.7 (28.9)	−1.5 (29.3)	−3.3 (26.1)	−6.2 (20.8)	−6.8 (19.8)	−7.2 (19.0)	−8.9 (16.0)	−4.3 (24.3)	−2.8 (27.0)	−1.7 (28.9)	−1.1 (30.0)	−8.9 (16.0)
Average rainfall mm (inches)	116.1 (4.57)	67.3 (2.65)	96.7 (3.81)	86.3 (3.40)	129.2 (5.09)	76.7 (3.02)	72.5 (2.85)	65.8 (2.59)	82.0 (3.23)	82.9 (3.26)	68.3 (2.69)	93.5 (3.68)	1,037.3 (40.84)
Source: NIWA (rain 1971–2000)
