= Fairfax, New Zealand =

Town in the Southland region of New Zealand

Coordinates: 46°12′40″S 168°03′04″E

Fairfax is a town in the Southland region of New Zealand's South Island.

The population was 1,911 in the 2013 census. This was an increase of 111 people since the 2006 Census.
