= Otautau =

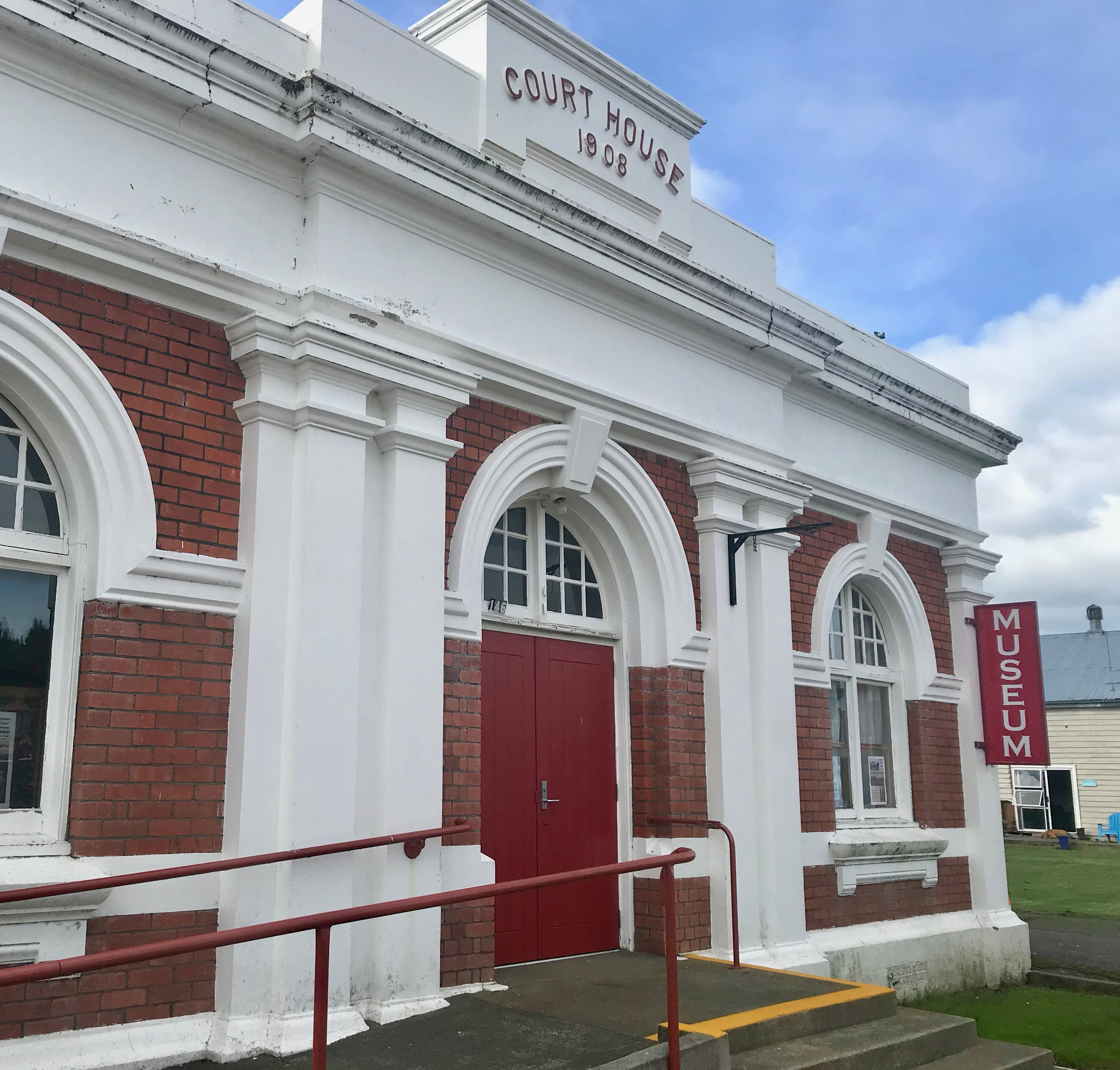
- Former courthouse; now the Otautau Museum
- Interactive map of Otautau
- Coordinates: 46°08′34″S 167°59′59″E
- Country: New Zealand
- Island: South Island
- Region: Southland region
- Territorial authorities of New Zealand: Southland District
- Ward: Waiau Aparima Ward
- Community: Wallace Takitimu Community
- Otautau: 1872
- Electorates: Invercargill; Te Tai Tonga (Māori)

Government
  - Territorial authority: Southland District Council
  - Regional council: Southland Regional Council
  - Mayor of Southland: Rob Scott
  - Invercargill MP: Penny Simmonds
  - Te Tai Tonga MP: Mananui Ramsden

Area
  - Total: 2.60 km^{2} (1.00 sq mi)
- Elevation: 60 m (200 ft)

Population (June 2025)
  - Total: 800
  - Density: 310/km^{2} (800/sq mi)
- Time zone: UTC+12:00 (NZST)
- Postal code: 9610 (rural: 9682 9683 9689)
- Local iwi: Ngāi Tahu

Otautau is a small farming, forestry and milling town located inland on the western edge of the Southland Plains of New Zealand on the banks of the Aparima River. Otautau is located approximately 40 kilometres (25 mi) north west of Invercargill. The average elevation of Otautau is 60 metres.

Otautau is also known as "The Heart of Western Southland" as can be seen on the roadside sign photo below. Otautau township has one building registered with Pouhere Taonga Heritage New Zealand. This is the historic courthouse building in Main Street from 1908, which currently houses the district's small museum and some archives from local institutions and businesses.

The New Zealand Ministry for Culture and Heritage gives a translation of "place of [an] ear pendant" for the name Ōtautau.

== Early history ==
There have been claims made in some modern day publications, that Otautau was founded after the discovery of gold in Central Otago in 1861, to meet the needs of travellers on their way to the then newly discovered gold fields. Yet others suggest that Otautau's early growth could be attributed to those travelling to Wakatipu, for similar reasons. However, in a handbook printed for use by the newly arriving miners, no such route via Otautau exists for any goldfield, from Tuapeka to Wakatipu.

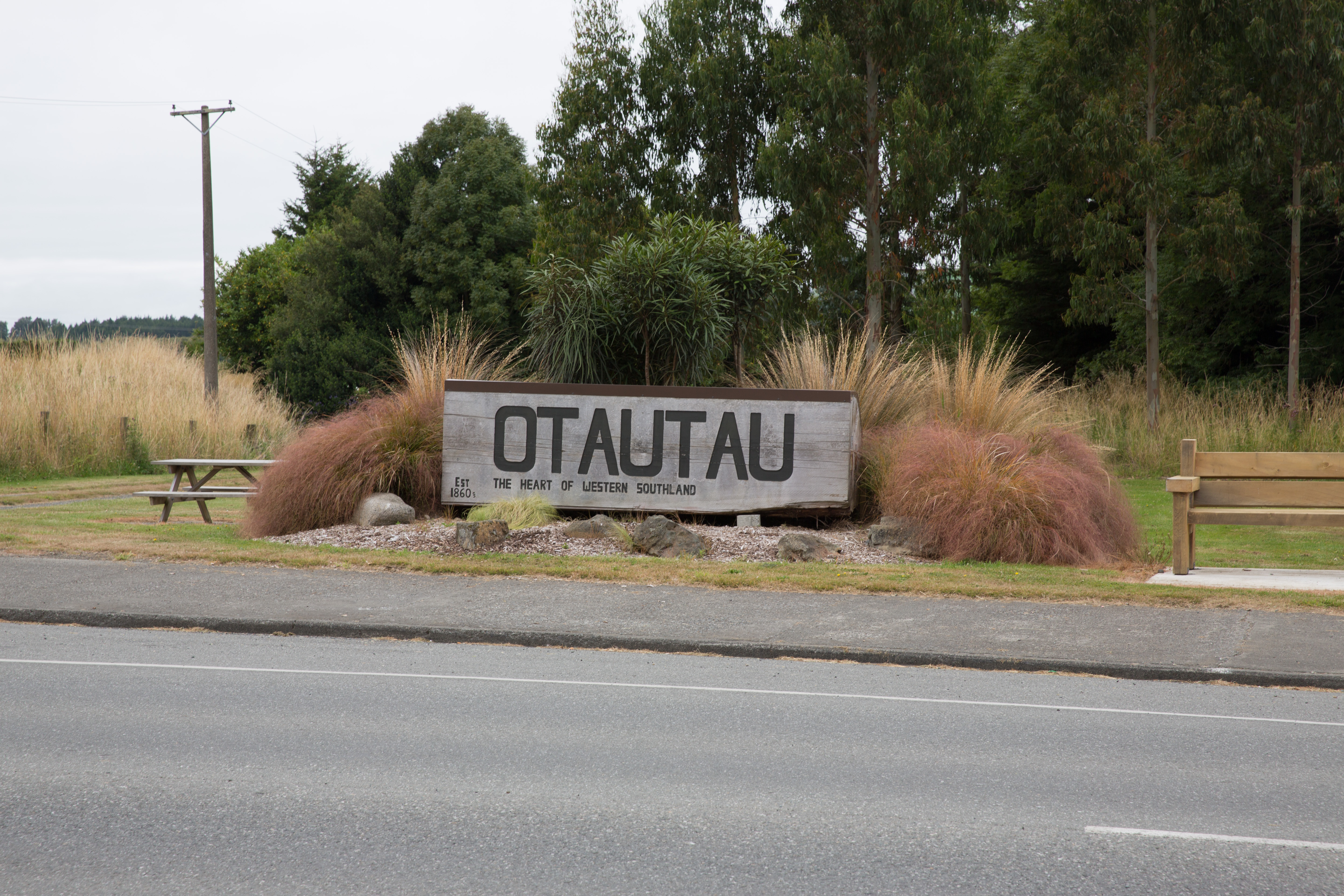
Roadside sign

Early records do hold vital clues that it was mainly agricultural needs and newly arrived settlers, which provided the bulk of early travel in the area, such as the diary entries quoted and early accounts of station life in Southland, re-printed in the series, 'The Conquerors – Saga of the Stations' found in the Southland Times, (the articles of which are collated into a book of the same name, held by Riverton Heritage Society, at Te Hikoi). In these, there is the idea that gold played some part in opening up land in the region, which it did, as miners later settled in the area, and invested their gains into many of the small towns and farming districts there, including Otautau, (see also below, account of Robert Campbell). In early news reports of the day, Riverton did advertise as being the closest port to the gold diggings, but this did not last long, as once the railway from Bluff, first to Invercargill then to Winton was completed, this moved the main of the southern goldfield traffic to that route. There are accounts of a few waggoners taking supplies both early on in the Wakatipu diggings and in later years, from Riverton, (a Mr. Cassels being one of them, and the partnership of Newsome, Rice and McIntosh, another), via The Otautau area to The Lakes. However, many more accounts are given of waggoners taking supplies and gold to and from Invercargill to The Lakes. The main of the traffic to and from the goldfields situated in South Otago, to the north of Otautau, was through Dunedin and Port Chalmers, which is much different to what has been suggested or claimed in some contemporary accounts.

The most accurate representation of the early Otautau area found to date, is from the book on Scotts Gap (just outside of Otautau, named after early run-holder, Matthew Scott): "Before the 1870s Otautau had very little settlement, being only an overnight camping stop for drovers and their wagons, quenching their thirst before fording the stream the next day to continue the journey inland." What can be proven without doubt, is that Otautau Township was not surveyed until March 1872, by E. Tanner, the resulting map being drawn by W.J. Percival in 1874. Even in the 1867 map of Aparima Hundred, from which land Otautau was taken, there is a large blank space where Otautau would later be. Giving further weight to the idea that the town may not have been founded in the 1860s as claimed, is the fact that the first general store in the township was not opened until 1876. This was owned by Robert Campbell, who was previously mining at Macetown. In records held at Archives NZ, information shows that the first land sale in the township was not made until late 1872.

Although the locality was originally only a wagon stop on the way to the interior, a township later formed. A very important factor in the growth of Otautau, came from the decision of the Wallace County Council, to move their office from Riverton to Otautau. This move was made official at the opening in March 1898 and lasted nearly 100 years, until the amalgamation of county councils formed the new Southland District Council, in 1989. Having the seat of administration for the County in Otautau meant many of its members moved there. The work created by and for the WCC (Wallace County Council), drew others to settle in the town with the promise of jobs. Between this and early agriculture which had originated with the Waste Land Leases in the area during the 1850s, Otautau became the hub of farming and settlement for the whole Central Western Southland District. The railway having arrived in December 1879, this added many advantages to both farmers and settlers.

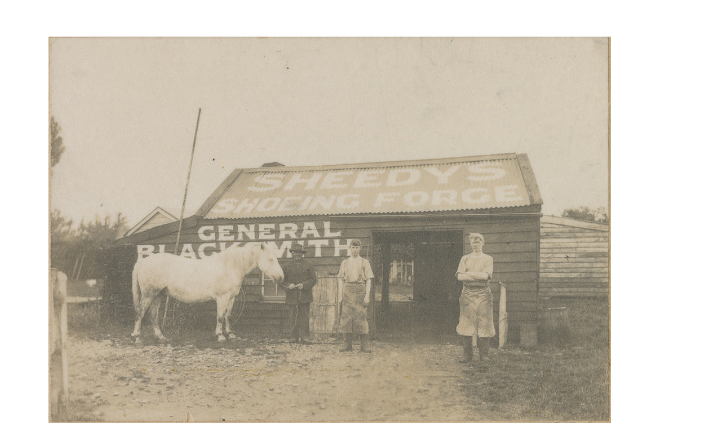
Daniel Lynch and horse

=== Early businesses ===
One of the earliest businesses in town was the Otautau Hotel, (originally started in the old Accommodation House) which claims on its facade, to have been started in 1871. However, it seems from land records and electoral rolls, to have only been owned by Thomas and Julianna Price from 1874. After a fire, the business moved to its still current site, on the Main Street in 1875.

Other early businesses were blacksmiths, the earliest one on record is also that of Daniel Lynch's, built near to the above Otautau Hotel. This was advertised as being operational from Sept 1875. Thomas Price himself built yet another Blacksmith's adjacent to his Otautau Hotel, advertised from July 1877.

=== Otautau Standard and Wallace County Chronicle ===
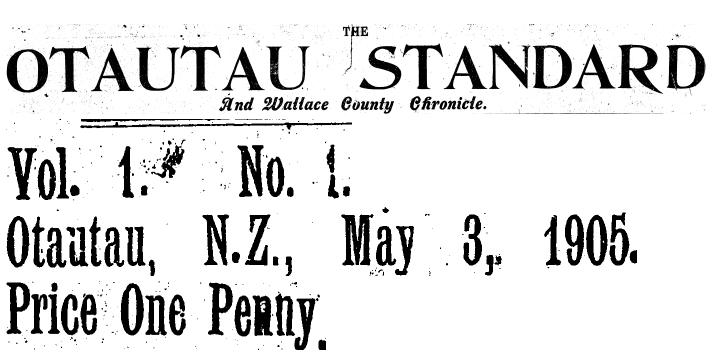
Otautau Standard and Wallace County Chronicle (May 1905).

Otautau was home to the Otautau Standard and Wallace County Chronicle from 1905 until publication ceased in 1946. The Otautau Standard was a weekly newspaper started by Frank Hyde. In 1906 Hyde sold the newspaper to John Fisher. The Fisher family remained in charge until its closure.

=== Otautau war memorial ===
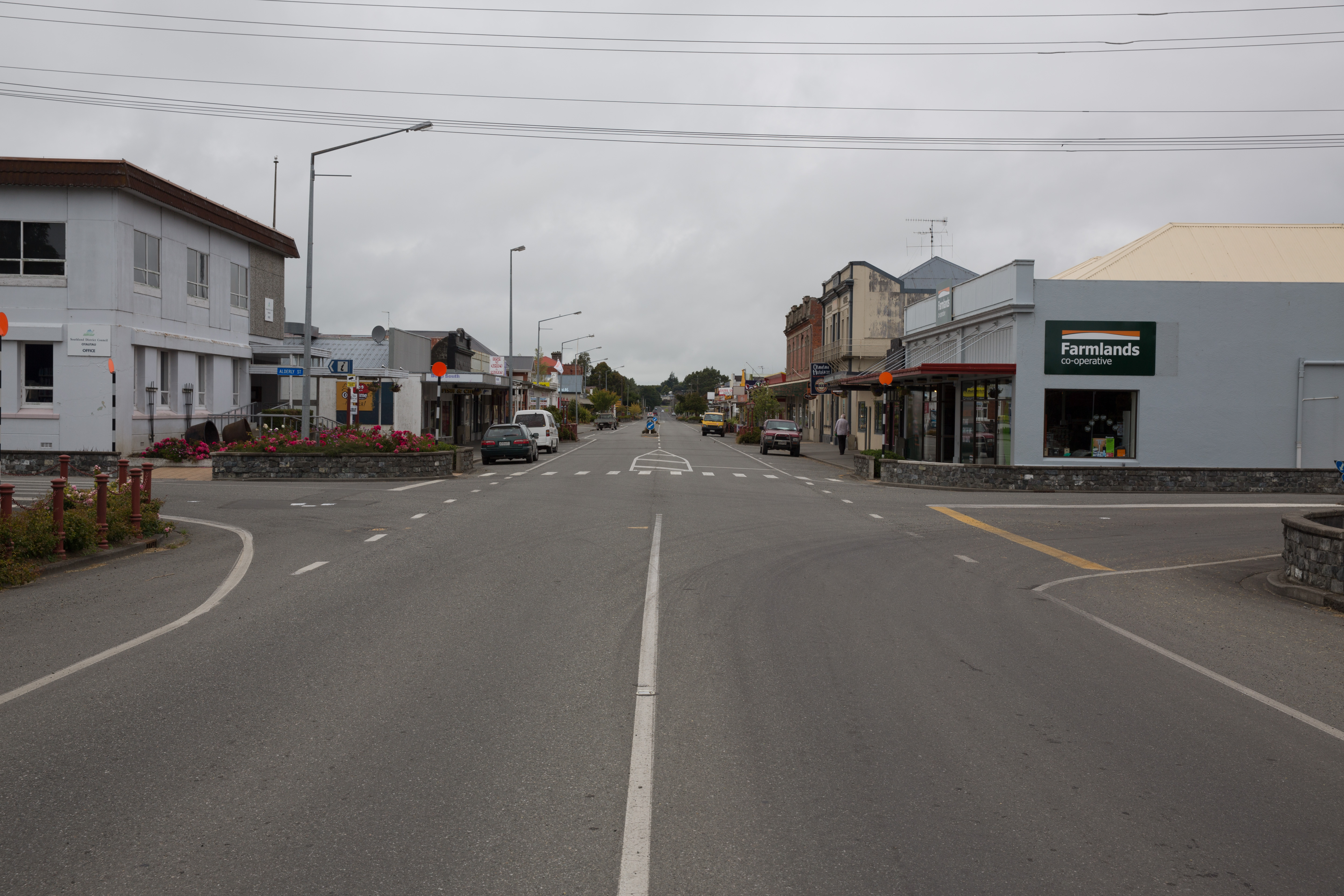
Main street

The Otautau war memorial is on Main Street, Otautau. It was opened by Prime Minister William Massey in 1922 and contains the names of local soldiers who died in World War I and World War II. Two canopied guns from Turkish and German forces are on either side of the memorial.

=== Forestry ===
Soon after World War II the New Zealand Forest Service began operating from Otautau. The planting of alien species began in 1949 and grew rapidly from the middle of the 1960s as a direct result of seasonal labour.

== Demographics ==
Otautau is described as a rural settlement by Statistics New Zealand. It covers 2.60 km^{2} (1.00 sq mi), and had an estimated population of 800 as of June 2025, with a population density of 308 people per km^{2}. It is part of the much larger Otautau statistical area.

Historical population for the settlement
Year	Pop.	±% p.a.
2006	753	—
2013	702	−1.00%
2018	753	+1.41%

Otautau had a population of 753 at the 2018 New Zealand census, an increase of 51 people (7.3%) since the 2013 census, and unchanged since the 2006 census. There were 318 households, comprising 405 males and 351 females, giving a sex ratio of 1.15 males per female, with 141 people (18.7%) aged under 15 years, 132 (17.5%) aged 15 to 29, 330 (43.8%) aged 30 to 64, and 150 (19.9%) aged 65 or older.

Ethnicities were 90.8% European/Pākehā, 13.1% Māori, 0.4% Pasifika, 1.6% Asian, and 1.2% other ethnicities. People may identify with more than one ethnicity.

Although some people chose not to answer the census's question about religious affiliation, 59.8% had no religion, 29.9% were Christian, 0.4% had Māori religious beliefs, 0.4% were Hindu and 1.2% had other religions.

Of those at least 15 years old, 57 (9.3%) people had a bachelor's or higher degree, and 207 (33.8%) people had no formal qualifications. 57 people (9.3%) earned over $70,000 compared to 17.2% nationally. The employment status of those at least 15 was that 294 (48.0%) people were employed full-time, 81 (13.2%) were part-time, and 21 (3.4%) were unemployed.

=== Otautau statistical area ===
Otautau statistical area covers 703.25 km^{2} (271.53 sq mi) and had an estimated population of 3,020 as of June 2025, with a population density of 4.3 people per km^{2}.

Historical population for the statistical area
Year	Pop.	±% p.a.
2006	2,784	—
2013	2,793	+0.05%
2018	2,808	+0.11%

Otautau had a population of 2,808 at the 2018 New Zealand census, an increase of 15 people (0.5%) since the 2013 census, and an increase of 24 people (0.9%) since the 2006 census. There were 1,071 households, comprising 1,491 males and 1,317 females, giving a sex ratio of 1.13 males per female. The median age was 35.3 years (compared with 37.4 years nationally), with 654 people (23.3%) aged under 15 years, 531 (18.9%) aged 15 to 29, 1,269 (45.2%) aged 30 to 64, and 354 (12.6%) aged 65 or older.

Ethnicities were 86.6% European/Pākehā, 11.1% Māori, 0.7% Pasifika, 6.9% Asian, and 3.0% other ethnicities. People may identify with more than one ethnicity.

The percentage of people born overseas was 13.6, compared with 27.1% nationally.

Although some people chose not to answer the census's question about religious affiliation, 53.3% had no religion, 37.3% were Christian, 0.3% had Māori religious beliefs, 0.3% were Hindu and 1.0% had other religions.

Of those at least 15 years old, 255 (11.8%) people had a bachelor's or higher degree, and 558 (25.9%) people had no formal qualifications. The median income was $37,000, compared with $31,800 nationally. 321 people (14.9%) earned over $70,000 compared to 17.2% nationally. The employment status of those at least 15 was that 1,236 (57.4%) people were employed full-time, 351 (16.3%) were part-time, and 57 (2.6%) were unemployed.

== Education ==
Otautau School is a full primary school for years 1 to 8 with a roll of 129 as of July 2026. The school first opened in 1880.

== Festivals ==
Over the years, there have been various events and festivals held in Otautau. The You 'n' Lamb Festival was an annual event organised by the now closed Otautau Lions Club, which is no longer held. Another annual event which was run for 8 years, was the Flowers, Quilts & Crafts Day, but this was sadly wound up in 2020. The Otautau Car Show is another long-standing annual event that is still currently held in February of each year (Covid permitting) and details of the current year's event can be found here.

== Climate ==
Climate data for Otautau (1981–2010)
Month	Jan	Feb	Mar	Apr	May	Jun	Jul	Aug	Sep	Oct	Nov	Dec	Year
Mean daily maximum °C (°F)	19.5 (67.1)	19.7 (67.5)	17.8 (64.0)	15.5 (59.9)	12.2 (54.0)	9.6 (49.3)	9.4 (48.9)	11.4 (52.5)	13.8 (56.8)	15.2 (59.4)	16.8 (62.2)	18.3 (64.9)	14.9 (58.9)
Daily mean °C (°F)	14.4 (57.9)	14.1 (57.4)	12.4 (54.3)	10.2 (50.4)	7.7 (45.9)	5.1 (41.2)	4.9 (40.8)	6.4 (43.5)	8.5 (47.3)	10.0 (50.0)	11.5 (52.7)	13.2 (55.8)	9.9 (49.8)
Mean daily minimum °C (°F)	9.4 (48.9)	8.6 (47.5)	7.0 (44.6)	4.9 (40.8)	3.2 (37.8)	0.6 (33.1)	0.3 (32.5)	1.5 (34.7)	3.2 (37.8)	4.8 (40.6)	6.2 (43.2)	8.2 (46.8)	4.8 (40.7)
Average rainfall mm (inches)	121.2 (4.77)	67.8 (2.67)	90.4 (3.56)	113.4 (4.46)	164.9 (6.49)	100.0 (3.94)	93.8 (3.69)	88.4 (3.48)	102.6 (4.04)	91.8 (3.61)	69.2 (2.72)	91.2 (3.59)	1,194.7 (47.02)
Source: NIWA (rain 1971–2000)
