= Athol, New Zealand =

Athol
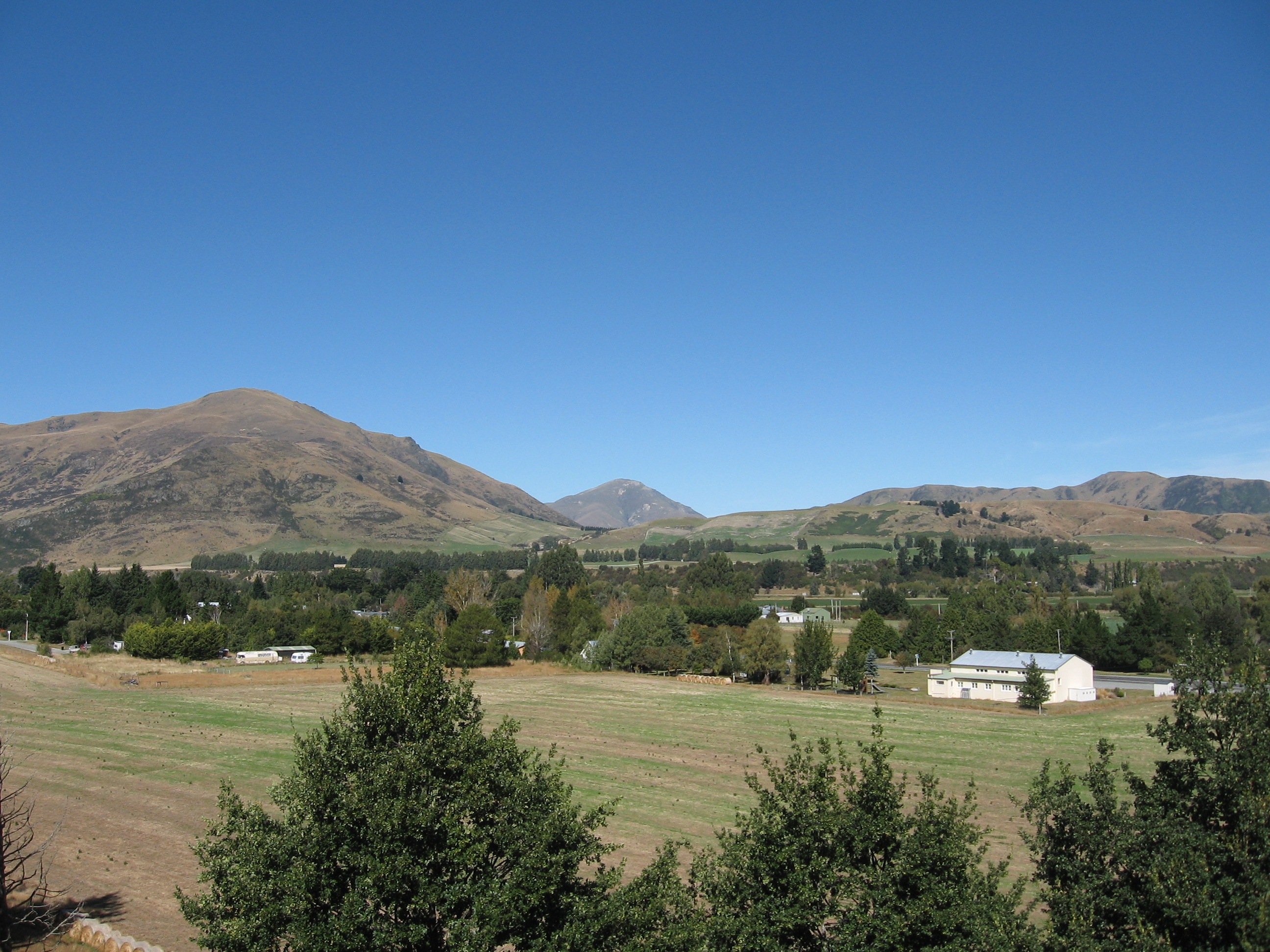
- Athol – March 2014

- Location within New Zealand
- Coordinates: 45°30.6′S 168°34.5′E
- Country: New Zealand
- Island: South Island
- Region: Southland
- Territorial authority: Southland District

Population (2006)
  - Total: 87
- Time zone: UTC+12 (NZST)
  - Summer (DST): UTC+13 (NZDT)
- Postcode(s): 9749
- Area code: 03
- Local iwi: Ngāi Tahu

Athol is a small town in Southland, New Zealand. It is located on State Highway 6, 55 km south of Queenstown, halfway between Lumsden and Kingston on the Southern Scenic Route. Farming has always been very important in the district, though in earlier times gold mining, centred on nearby Nokomai, was also significant. In recent decades tourist numbers have grown. The Mataura River is well known for the quality of its brown trout fishing, and the Around the Mountains Cycle Trail, opened in November 2014, has further boosted visitor figures.

== Name ==
There is some uncertainty over how Athol received its name. The first record of it is when the township was surveyed in 1863. Several suggestions have been made. One is that it was named after Harry Athol, the proprietor of the first hotel. There is no early record of a person of this name and there may be a confusion with Harry Arthur, who ran the Athol accommodation house in the 1860s. Another is that it was named after the home district in Scotland of early landowner W. B. Rogers. As Rogers was born in New Zealand and his father came from Cumberland, England, this is not likely to be the case.

It seems probable it was named after Atholl in Perthshire, Scotland and this might be because the Superintendent of Southland Province at the time of the survey, Dr. James Menzies, came from there.

== Geography ==
Athol is 275 metres or 902 feet above sea level. It lies on a small plain surrounded by mountains, including the Mid Dome (1,478 metres or 4,849 feet) to the south and Flagstaff (1,037 metres or 3,402 feet) to the east.

To the west of the township flow the Eyre Creek and smaller Quoich Creek, and these join the Mataura River about 2 kilometres or 1.2 miles to the south.

== Notable people ==
- Patrick Caples (c. 1830 – 1904, explorer and gold prospector, who mined on Paddy's Alley in the mid 1860s
- Adam Hamilton (1880–1952), first leader of the New Zealand National Party, was the Presbyterian home missionary in Athol in 1910
- Ack Soper (1936–2020), New Zealand rugby union player
