= Around the Mountains Cycle Trail =

New Zealand cycling and tramping trail

Coordinates: 45°20′S 168°43′E

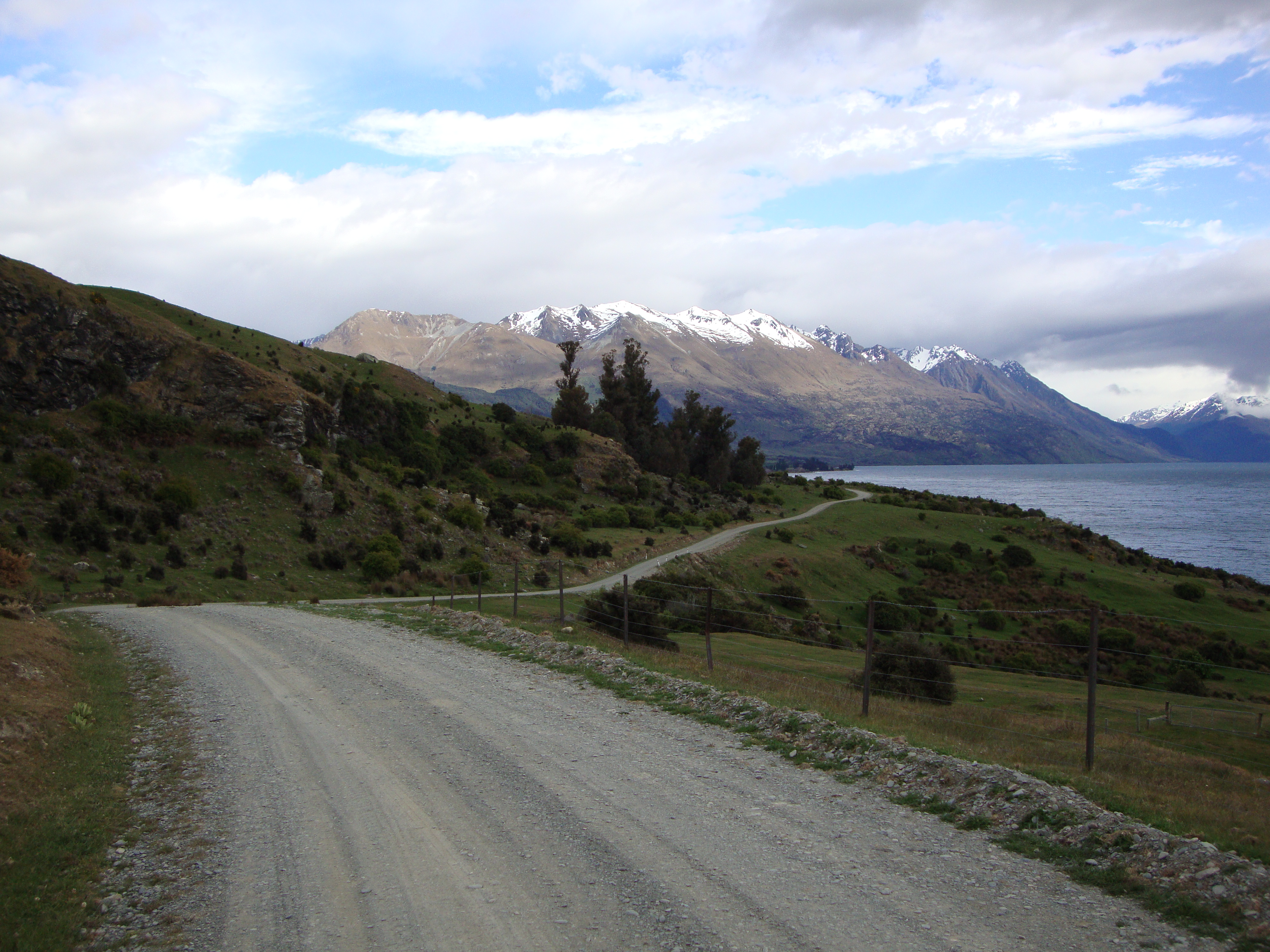
A section of the trail near Mount Nicholas.

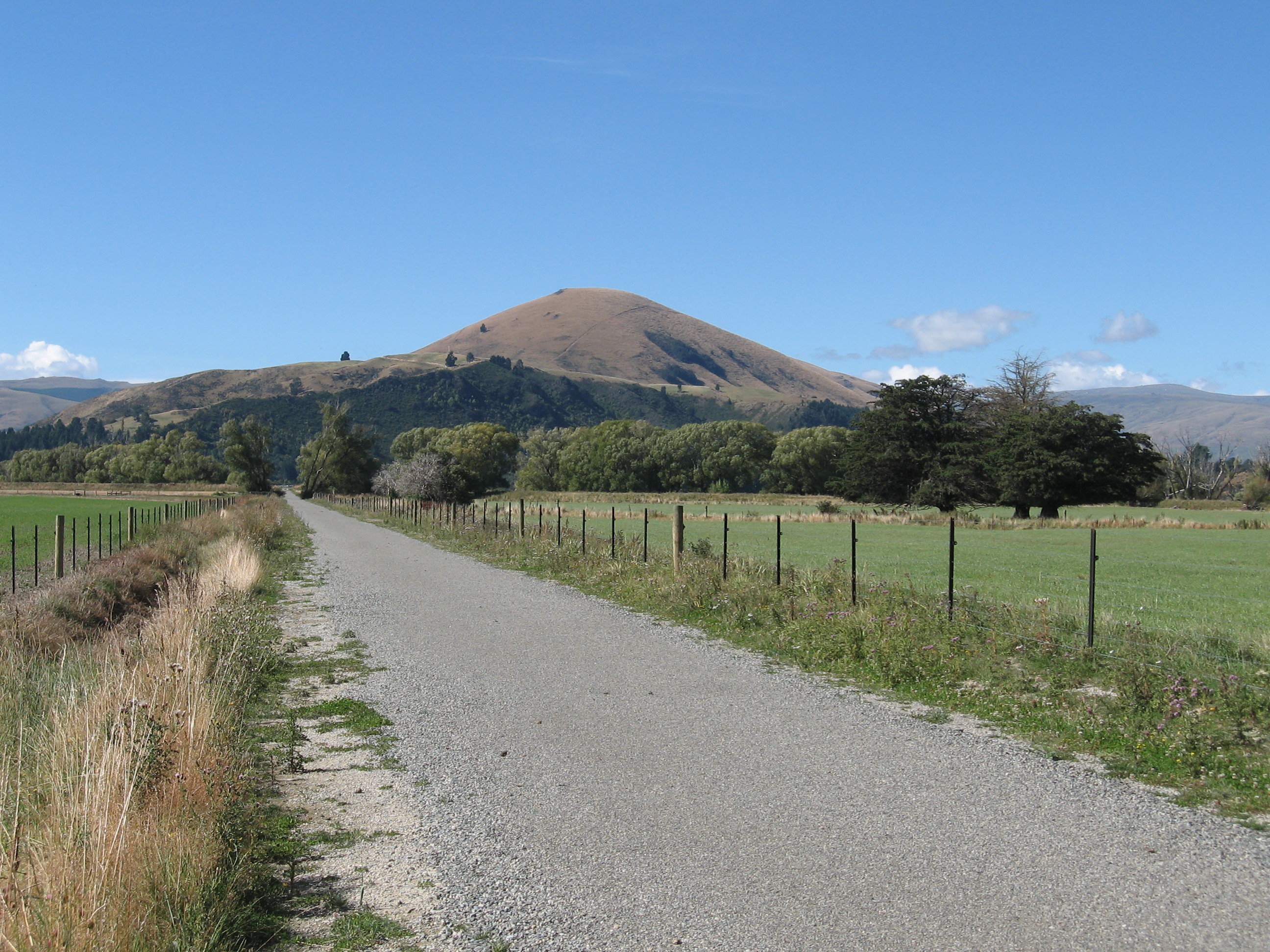
The cycle trail near Athol. The Kingston to Mossburn section opened on 1 November 2014

The Around the Mountains Cycle Trail is a cycle trail set in the remote wilderness of southern New Zealand. 186 km in length, it can be ridden in either direction, starting at Kingston or Walter Peak and taking three to five days at a relaxed pace to complete. The Around the Mountains Cycle Trail is recognised as one of New Zealand's 23 Great Rides.

The Around the Mountains Cycle Trail offers alpine vista views, a glimpse at the pristine waters of the Mavora Lakes (an awe-inspiring location featured in The Lord of the Rings Trilogy), as well as being able to cycle alongside the Ōreti River and Mataura River, through native tussock lands and authentic high country farms. The trail can also include a ride on the century-old coal-fired steamship, the TSS Earnslaw.

== Route ==
Many cyclists start the trail at Walter Peak Station on the shore of Lake Wakatipu, after a boat trip on the TSS Earnslaw. The trail then follows Mount Nicholas Road, Mavora Lakes Road and Centre Hill Road. At Centre Hill the purpose built cycle trail starts and follows the south bank of the Ōreti River through to Mossburn. From Mossburn the trail continues to Lumsden, and then from Lumsden the trail passes through the small townships of Five Rivers, Athol, Garston and finishes back at the lakeside of Lake Wakatipu in Kingston.

== Grade ==
The Around the Mountains Cycle Trail is classed as a Grade 2–3 ride (New Zealand Cycle Trail Design guide classifications) with conditions suitable for novices and families, with the exception of the 2.5 km-long Von Hill climb which can be walked if it proves too challenging. The constructed sections of the trail amount to approximately 90 km of predominantly Grade 2 track. Additionally sections of the trail utilise existing roads and considered as Grade 3 sections.

== Funding and construction ==
The Around the Mountains Cycle Trail has been funded as one of the projects of the New Zealand Cycle Trail. The announcement of government funding for Quick Start Trails in 2009 by then Prime Minister John Key was the catalyst for making the Around the Mountains Cycle Trail a reality. Southland District Council successfully secured the financial backing needed to create a trail through some of the most beautiful scenery in New Zealand.

Work on stage one from Kingston to Mossburn started in June 2013 and included the construction of purpose-built cycle bridges crossing the Mataura River and Eyre Creek. It was officially opened by Deputy Prime Minister Bill English at a ceremony in Lumsden on 1 November 2014.

Further funding was approved in 2014 to enable SDC to embark on stage two from Mossburn to Walter Peak.

Stage two of the cycle trail was completed in 2017, using existing low volume roads from the end point of Centre Hill through to the termination at Walter Peak Station on the shores of Lake Wakatipu.

Funding was approved in April 2019 from the Ministry of Business, Innovation and Employment (MBIE) to install 28 interpretation panels capturing the unique history of the local areas, along with bike stands and water tanks to enhance the shelters. Installation was completed in December 2019.

Flooding occurred in February 2020 and an application to MBIE was approved allowing repairs to the Cycle Trail as well as improvements to sections of the trail, ensuring the quality of the trail meets the Grade two standard. Works started in August 2020.

== Management ==
Southland District Council employs a dedicated Trail Manager and there is an official partnership programme with local businesses.
