= Mataura River =

River in New Zealand

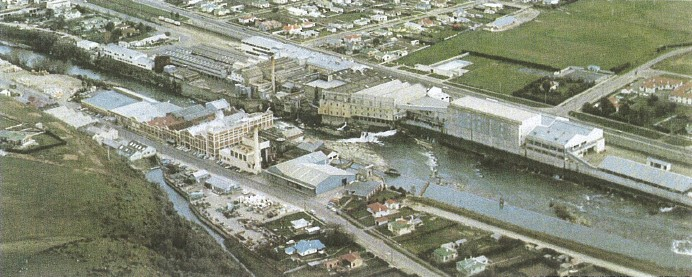
- The Mataura Paper Mill operated on the river until 2000

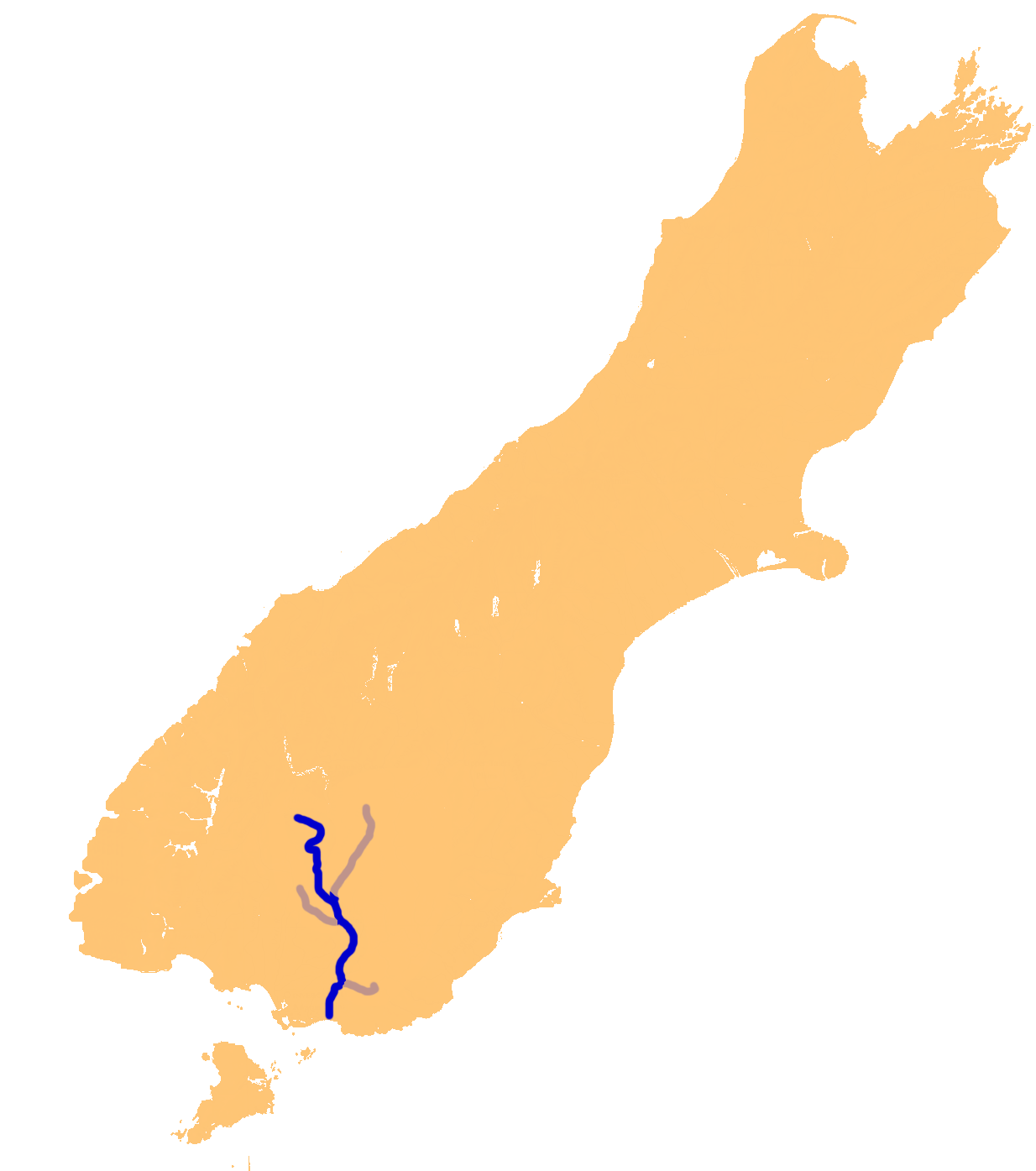
- Native name: Mataura (Māori)

Location
- Country: New Zealand
- Region: Southland
- Towns: Athol, Gore, Mataura, Wyndham

Physical characteristics
- Source: Mataura Saddle
  - location: Eyre Mountains
  - coordinates: 45°18′58″S 168°25′12″E
- Mouth: Toetoes Bay
  - location: Pacific Ocean
  - coordinates: 46°34′S 168°43′E
  - elevation: Sea level
- Length: 240 km (150 mi)

Basin features
- Tributaries
  - left: Nokomai River, Waikaia River, Mokoreta River

The Mataura River is in the Southland Region of the South Island of New Zealand. It is 240 kilometres (150 mi) long.

== Description ==
The river's headwaters are located in the Eyre Mountains to the south of Lake Wakatipu. From there it flows southeast towards Gore, where it turns southward. It then passes through the town of Mataura, and enters the Pacific Ocean at Toetoes Bay on the southern coast of the South Island. Much of its channel is braided.

The Mataura is renowned as a source of brown trout, and is a popular fishing venue, including whitebaiting. It has been identified as an Important Bird Area by BirdLife International because it supports breeding colonies of the endangered black-billed gull.

== History ==
Until about 18,000 years ago the Mataura drained Lake Wakatipu. The Kingston Flyer follows part of the former river bed, now blocked by glacial moraine.

For Māori, the Mataura was an important ara tawhito (traditional travel route) that provided direct access from Murihiku to Whakatipu Waimāori (Lake Wakatipu). The Mataura was a significant kāinga mahinga kai (food-gathering place) for local Kāi Tahu, and was tribally renowned for its abundance of kanakana (lamprey, Geotria australis). Kanakana are normally caught when climbing natural waterfalls, such as Te Au-nui-pihapiha-kanakana (Mataura Falls).

The Mataura, along with the three other main Southland rivers, the Waiau, Ōreti and Aparima, breached during the Southland floods of January 1984. Commercial and residential areas of the town of Mataura were particularly affected, including the pulp and paper plant.
