= History of Otago =

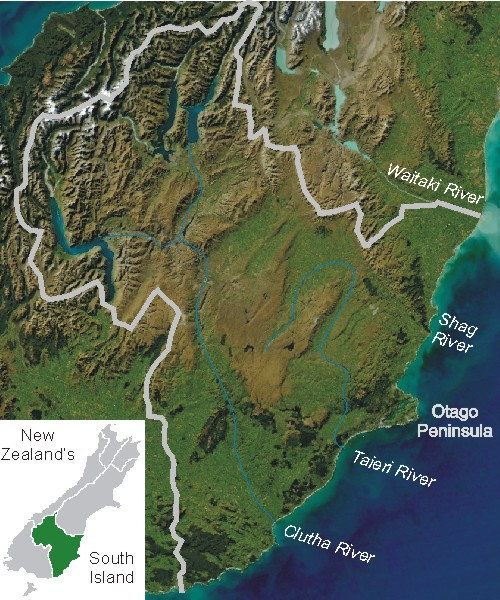
Otago, New Zealand, inland mountains and high plains with flatter land near the coast. The boundary of the Otago Region (1989-today) is shown in gray.

The Otago region of New Zealand is one of the more isolated places of the inhabited earth. Its high latitude, elevation and distance from larger foreign and domestic population centres have defined Otago at each stage of its history.

The human occupation of Otago begins around the year 1300 with the arrival of Māori soon after they settled in New Zealand. The Māori were originally from tropical Polynesia; they continually adapted to the new and changing environment over the next 500 years. At that time the first European sealers and whalers arrived, followed by the founding of the colony of Otago's first city Dunedin in 1848.

New Zealand's ecology had evolved in near isolation from the rest of the world for 85 million years. At first settlement it was almost devoid of land mammals, meaning the fauna was very susceptible to introduced land predators. Humans burnt the forests, ate the animals and introduced numerous predators and exotic plants to Otago. This came in two great waves around the years 1300 and 1800, although the effects of both introductions would continue for centuries. This was followed by intensive farming and alteration to the rivers and lakes of Otago for water and electricity production.

Until the late 19th century the vast majority of permanent settlements in Otago were on the eastern coast, which was rich in resources and has a more temperate climate. During this time inland Otago was largely used seasonally and for its mineral deposits, first by the Māori digging for pounamu stone, then European settlers searching for gold. With the advent of the railway, and refrigerated trade with Britain, inland Otago became more consistently productive. Rapid urbanisation has led to the creation of main population centres on the flatter eastern coast and in the high inland plains between the mountain ranges. This has been accompanied with immense social change in Otago's population, similar but distinct to the rest of New Zealand.

The boundaries of Otago have changed over time. However, the Waitaki River, currently Otago's northern extent, has often been used as a natural border. Ngāi Tahu, the dominant Māori tribe in the region, currently has three rūnanga (sub-tribes) within Otago and their traditional extent is not limited to the region. Today Otago is divided into the Central Otago, Clutha, Queenstown-Lakes and Waitaki (partly in Canterbury) Districts, and the city of Dunedin, which has half the region's population. It excludes the Southland plains, Stewart Island and Fiordland, although the historical province of Otago and much older Murihiku region often included them.

== The first settlements until the Treaty of Waitangi (1300–1840) ==
=== Initial Māori settlement (1300–1500) ===
The precise date at which the first inhabitants of New Zealand reached Otago and the extreme south (known to later Māori as Murihiku) remains uncertain. Māori descend from a race of Polynesian seafarers who moved from East and South-East Asia to the islands of the Pacific. Tradition tells of their further voyages to New Zealand from Hawaiki, and some commentators have identified this homeland as Havai'i, an island in the Society Group. Overpopulation, scarcity of food and civil war forced many of them to migrate once more to New Zealand.

Māori settled New Zealand between 1280 and 1320. They quickly learnt to hunt the numerous species of moa and seals, and settled across the North and South Islands in less than a few decades. A change in the pollen record from c. 1400 in an inland Otago forest to bracken flora might indicate fires being lit during Māori exploration.

The first parts of New Zealand settled by Polynesians were the northern areas of the North Island and the east coast of the South Island. The later contraction of food sources led to depopulation in the South Island, while the introduction of kūmara into the North Island led to population growth and the eventual evolution of a different material and social culture. The larger population in the North Island eventually led to migration to the South Island from the late 16th century onwards.

Polynesian migration

Traditional Māori folklore name the Kahui Tipua ("Band of Ogres") as the first inhabitants of the South Island, identified by folklore as a tribe of supernatural beings. After the Kahui Tipua, another tribe named Te Rapuwai inhabited the island. The tribe has left few traces, with no Māori claiming descent from them. These names may also be the names of earlier assimilated groups whose descendants have now been re-categorised under the names "Waitaha" and "Kāti Mamoe", as Kāi Tahu have since claimed those groups as part of a new iwi known as Ngāi Tahu.

Te Rapuwai did leave many place names to mark their presence and left an archeological record, including shells found along South Island beaches. They were known to inhabit the Kaitangata Lake district in South Otago, and had further settlements at the mouth of the Clutha River.

Researchers know almost as little of the immediate successors of Te Rapuwai, the Waitaha. Hector suggested that another tribe, the Katikura, an offshoot of the Ngāpuhi tribe of Tāmaki Makarau, lived in Otago at some remote period before the arrival of the Waitaha. But beyond a vague tradition that they burnt off the forest and made the open grassland (E Waka-Papihi), no information survives concerning them. According to the lore of North Island Māori, the Waitaha people arrived in the Takitimu canoe captained by Tamatea. The Takitimu, legendarily associated with the discredited theory of a great fleet dated to 1350 AD, made its landfall in the Bay of Plenty and then sailed down the coast of both islands, even as far as the Waiau River in Southland, leaving settlers at suitable districts. This voyage of Tamatea became so important a landmark in post-pākehā conceptions of Māori history that the antiquity of any event, such as the great fires which destroyed the forests of Otago and Southland, have been indicated by saying, "That happened in the time of Tamatea." Stack, one of those who developed this now contested conception, portrayed the Waitaha occupation of Te Waipounamu as covering a century, from 1477 to 1577, a calculation based on the assumption of twenty years to a generation. His conception of what was happening is probably wrong, but his dating, taken broadly is probably about right for this later settlement phase, which may indeed be that of the historical Waitaha. The estuaries, mudflats, sandy beaches of Murihiku provided fish, seals, seabirds, mussels, pāuas, pipis and cockles. The dense podocarp forest, including mataī, totara, kahikatea, and rimu, teemed with wekas, tūīs, pigeons, and other birds. In the coastal lakes such as Waihola, eels abounded. At some point during the first centuries of occupation they discovered pounamu. Thus the South Island also became known as Te Wahipounamu. The southern Māori moved with the seasons to exploit the rich resources of Murihiku.

Tradition attributed to the Waitaha a profound knowledge of incantations (karakia) and of the science of navigation. They painted designs in caves and named many of the distinctive features of the Otago landscape, well illustrated in the tale of Rākaihautū, known the great digger of lakes. The Waitaha settlement of the South Island seems to have been the latter part of a period of peace and plenty. Stack said that "they increased and multiplied so rapidly that they are described as having covered the face of the land like ants". A more credible explanation might be that, on the arrival of the first Waitaha wave in the south, they found it an abundant land and, under such favourable conditions, their numbers greatly increased. However this time of prosperity was not to last. Already, by the end of the fourteenth century New Zealand's environment was beginning to change. The climate became cooler, the podocarp forest retreated, and the moa population began to decline. The changing environment affected those who relied upon moas and seals for food and forced them to develop more effective techniques for catching birds and fish. The largest settlements of the early centuries lost their importance and declined. The population declined because of emigration north to regions where one could cultivate kūmara (sweet potatoes).

Commentaries have led some to identify the Waitaha of Otago with the moa-hunters of whom so many traces remain. This is not entirely unreasonable, although on Stack's dating of Waitaha, and on modern dating of moa hunter sites, the Waitaha would be latter arrivals. In reality their name has probably been used in tradition, confusingly, to also comprehend earlier arrivals whose own names for themselves are now obscured in the etymological ghost names of Kahui Tipua and Te Rapuwai. The Waitaha of historical oral tradition may have enjoyed a good food-supply for many years and they were probably some of the later moa hunters of the archaeological record. These latter probably preserved moa-flesh in fat, wrapped up in bands of kelp, fastened with tōtara-bark strips and bartered it for such northern products as flax mats, huia feathers and kūmara. The Waitaha must have hunted the moa with such steady persistence that its complete extermination became merely a question of time, though at what date this occurred is not known. Certain it is, however, that the moa found its last stronghold in the inland districts of Otago where the most valuable discoveries of moa remains have been made. Either the birds survived there much longer or else the remarkable preservative quality of the dry air caused the remains to resist decay. Probably both these alternatives apply though it seems more likely that, as its numbers diminished and the attacks of its foes proceeded with unabated vigour, the moa became restricted to the fastnesses of Central Otago, especially to the area between Lake Wakatipu and the Lammerlaw Range.

=== Māori adaptation and migrations (1500–1788) ===
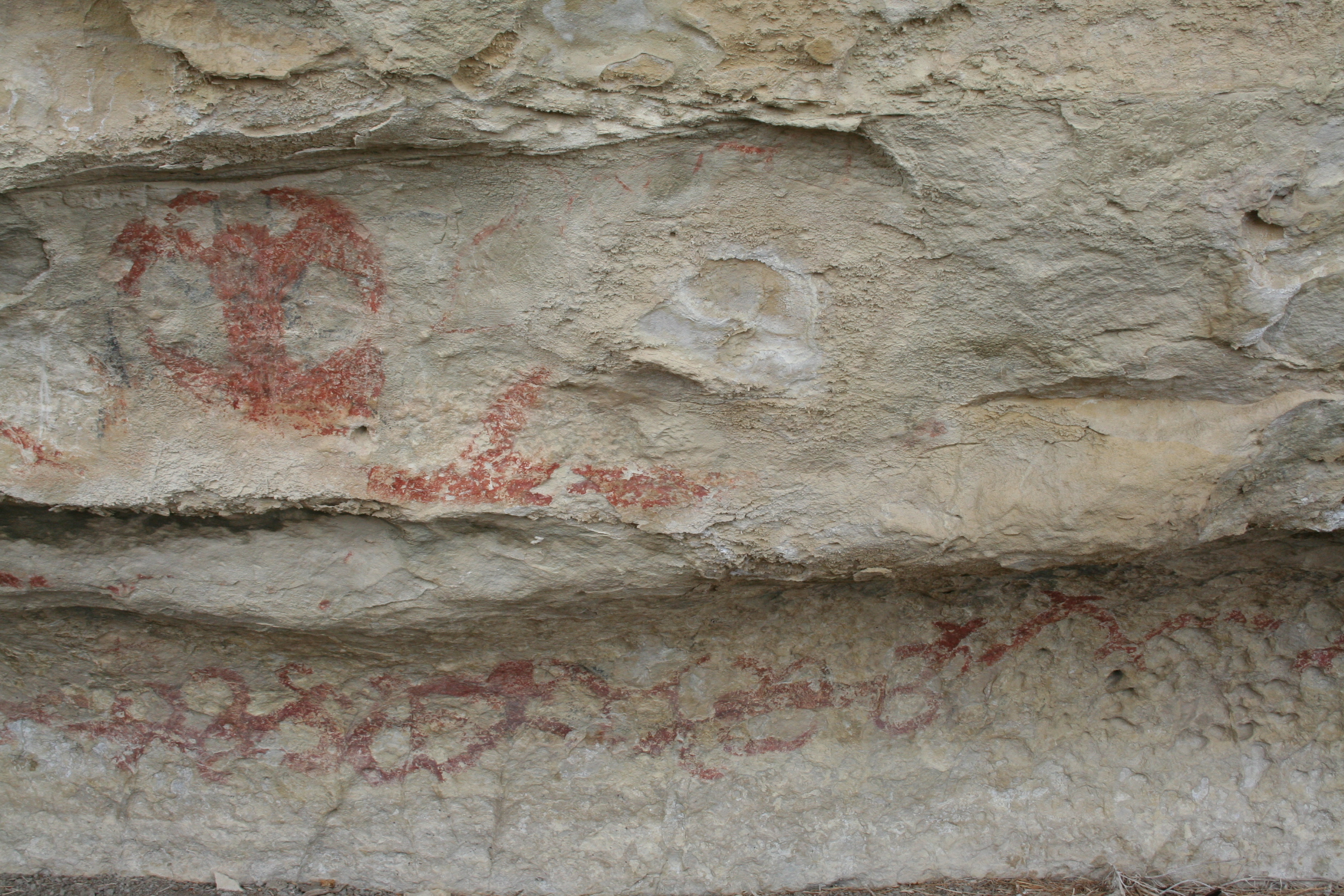
Takiroa Rock Art Site near Duntroon, Waitaki Valley, South Island

The 19th century European view of this was that Waitaha did not remain in undisputed possession of their hunting-preserves. They fell victim to a misguided generosity. Seized by a friendly impulse, they sent across the straits to their friends, the Kāti Māmoe (or Ngāi Māmoe), some of the surplus stores they had accumulated, and "as their friends smacked their lips over these dainties ... they resolved to wrest the coveted preserves from the Waitaha". Although the Waitaha, unused to war, soon succumbed, a considerable amount of inter-marriage took place. The words are Canon Stack's and according to him the "invasion" began about 1477 AD. In fact few records of strife in Otago during this period survive and, as Stack acknowledged, Māori did not accept this construction of their traditions. More likely, as Anderson and others have maintained, this was simply a migration like later ones, accompanied by occasional bloodshed, not an "invasion". Early in the seventeenth century, a hapu of the Ngāti Kahungunu began to infiltrate the Kāti Māmoe domain. However they failed to advance beyond Kaikōura, where a chief of Kāti Māmoe killed the Ngāti Kahungunu chief, Manawa, in a skirmish.

But with the arrival of a third hapu of the Ngati Kahungunu, the Ngāi Tahu (or Kāi Tahu), towards the close of the 17th century, the stormy era of Otago history began. Again it has been said that the desire to possess unlimited supplies of the precious pounamu or greenstone, which occurred only in the South Island, provided a powerful incentive for invasion. But this has been questioned. The combatants don't fall neatly into groups of Kāti Māmoe and Kāi Tahu and the given reasons for strife don't refer to greenstone. Hostilities were protracted and Kāti Mamoe were never "subdued". There were still people of that descent living in the region when the first Europeans arrived and Kāi Tahu were just another Māori people also living in the south.

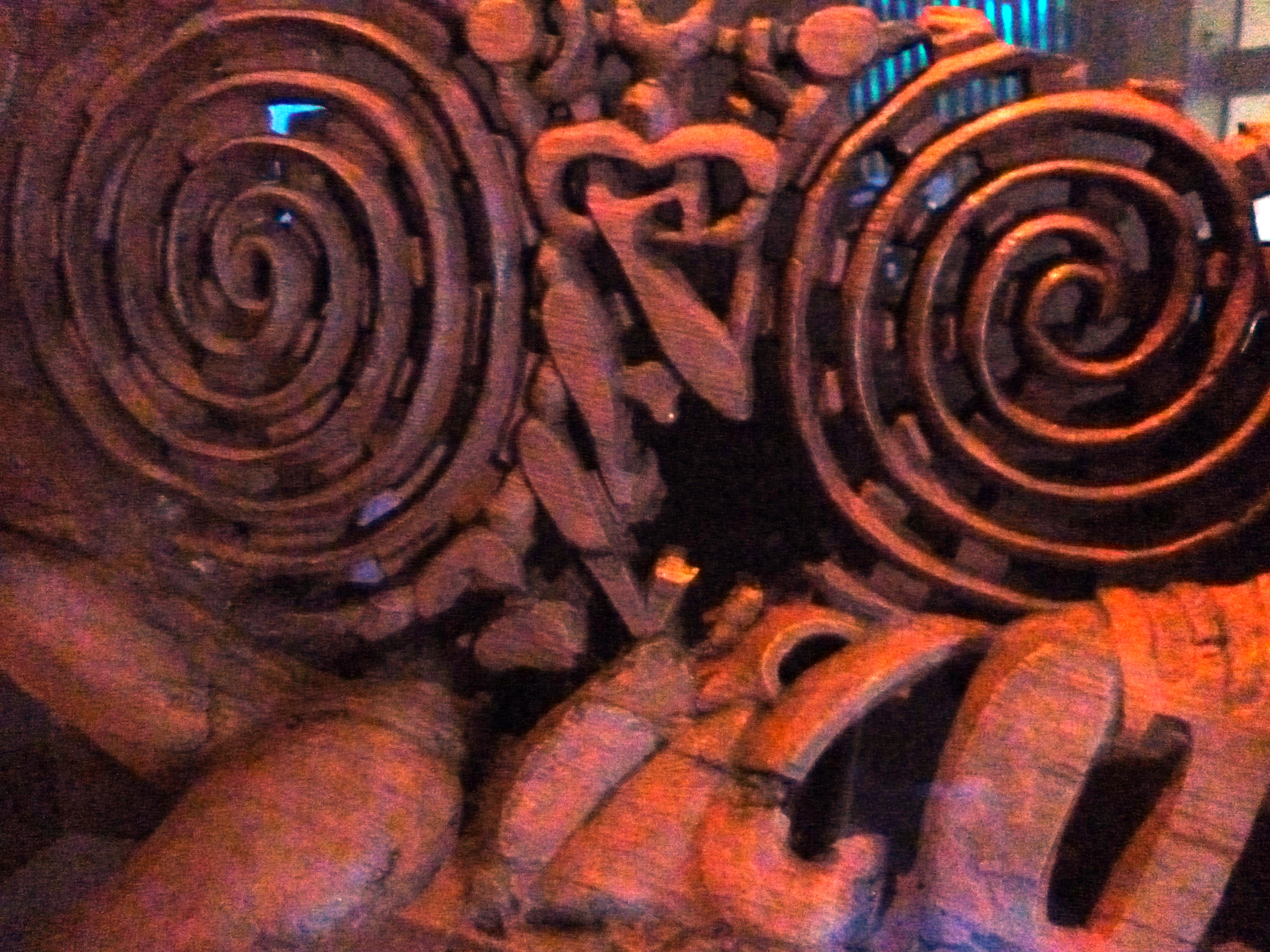
Waka (boat) from the Taieri River plains.

Much of the history of this time centres around the turbulent careers of two chiefs, Te Wera of the Kāi Tahu, and Taoka, his bitter enemy, who were cousins. These two men apparently became involved in several episodes featuring a surfeit of bloodshed. One such incident occurred when Te Wera killed and ate Taoka's son, whom he and his men had encountered on the south bank of the Waitaki. In revenge, Taoka besieged Te Wera's pā at Karitane, at that time a Kāi Tahu stronghold. The besiegers camped at the southern extremity of the sandspit in Waikouaiti River, called Ohine-pouweru, and lived there for six months. Frustrated in their endeavours to seize the pā, Taoka's men uttered the dire threat, "We'll starve you out." But back came the defiant cry, shouted by the Kāi Tahu chief above the great gateway, "You shall never reach us! Only by the army of thirst shall we be overcome." Taoka then uttered threats in vain and when at length his food supplies had dwindled, he was reluctantly forced to raise the siege.

Similar skirmishes continued throughout the eighteenth century, waged with a merciless ferocity that must have seriously reduced a once numerous population. On occasion the battles became scenes of bloody carnage. Such conflict occurred in 1750 on the site of the present township of Balclutha, which saw the triumph of the Kāti Mamoe. Some fifteen years later at Kaitangata, the Kāi Tahu avenged this defeat and routed the Kāti Mamoe. Eventually the two groups decided to erect a post on a conspicuous hill known as Popoutunoa, near Clinton: to mark the division of the territory. Thus the Kati Mamoe remained unmolested in the southern portion of the island. Or at least this is Canon Stack's view of the significance of these events. Certainly an end to conflict was brokered at this time which involved marriage across Kāti Mamoe and Kai Tahu lines.

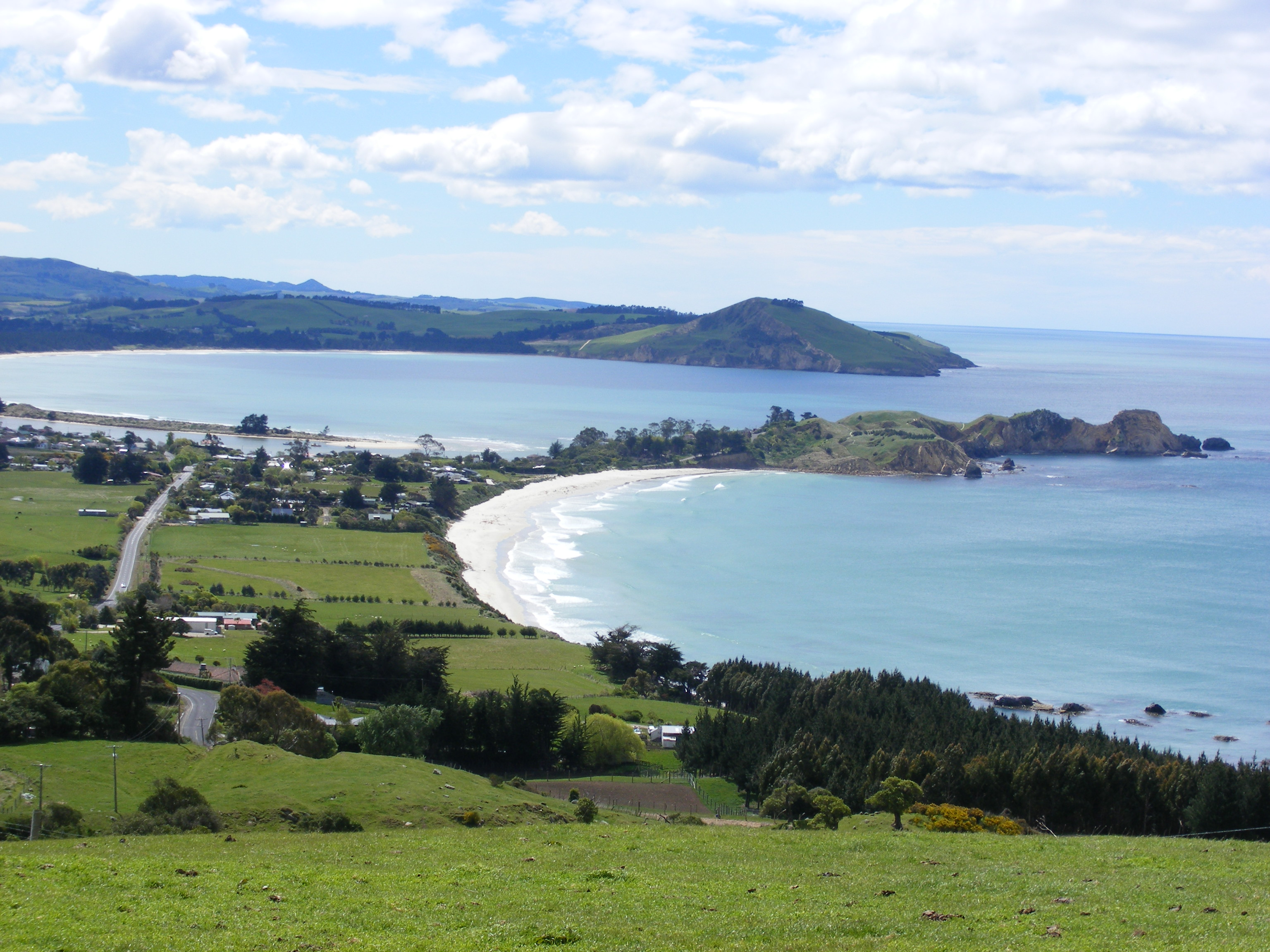
Pā at Huriawa Peninsula

This short-lived amity came to an end in 1775 when the sons of Te Wera left Stewart Island to establish a pa between Colac Bay and Orepuki. As the Kati Mamoe could not allow this challenge to pass unnoticed, they rose and destroyed the pa. Their triumph was brief, for while they made their way to the Otago Peninsula, Taihua and his Kati Mamoe party marched into an ambush at Hillend, near the Pomahaka, where their enemies butchered them. Before the close of the century, warfare had again broken out at the Otago Heads, Port Molyneux, and Preservation Inlet. In the vicinity of Lake Te Anau one of the last and most desperate battles took place. A large number of Kāti Māmoe were killed and the broken survivors "disappeared into the gloomy forests and never again man's eye beheld them." About the same time, the coast-dwelling Kāti Māmoe at Preservation Inlet were also defeated, a pitiful remnant escaping in the direction of Dusky Sound. Summing up the warfare in Otago, Beattie states that of the twenty-five battles which took place south of Temuka, five were family affairs in which Kāti Māmoe and Kāi Tahu fought among themselves. A feature of the warfare was the monotonous regularity with which the two sides won alternately until the closing phases when the Kāi Tahu established ascendancy. According to Beattie, defeated in one battle after another, the dwindling band of Kāti Māmoe retreated in various directions, some to the western bank of the Waiau River, where they took refuge in caves, some to the far reaches of Te Anau and Manapouri, and some even to the cold shelters of the fiords. This has been the traditional European view but it is not borne out by the survival of Kāti Māmoe lines of descent into the principal chiefly families of Otago into and beyond the time of the European arrival and it has been disputed in modern times.

=== European explorers, sealers and whalers (1788–1820) ===
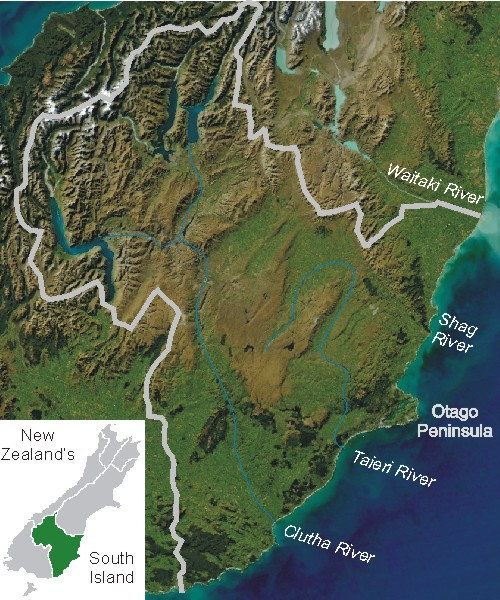
Otago, New Zealand (1300–1840), inland mountains and high plains with flatter land near the coast. The boundary of the Otago Region (1989-today) is shown in gray.

In the late 18th century several European naval expeditions visited southernmost New Zealand, notably the three of Captain James Cook, who did not land in Otago. However, Joseph Banks sighted a fire on the Otago Peninsula in 1770 which represents the first indirect contact between Māori and Europeans in the Otago Region. As a consequence, following the settlement of Sydney Cove in New South Wales in 1788, visits by several private ventures followed. These saw the first European women to visit New Zealand (in 1792) and to sojourn there (1795–1797), the sojourn of 244 people on an inhospitable shore for several years, and the building of the first European house and ship in New Zealand. Some of these ventures resulted from the pursuit of seals and constituted the first sealing boom. The visitors encountered few Māori (few lived in the relevant areas), and their presents of iron tools perhaps led to those people's demise at the hands of their countrymen. The revival of New Zealand sealing in 1803 saw the detailed exploration of the south west coast and the penetration of Foveaux Strait from the west. At the same time visitors explored the east coast and the subantarctic islands: principally American ships, which produced Owen Folger Smith's charting of Foveaux Strait from the east in 1804. From 1805 to 1807 a boom took place at the Antipodes Islands — territorially part of historical Otago, and probably the source of the Creed manuscript's early European visitors to Otago harbour about 1806/1807. In any case, Sydney sealers operated on the Dunedin coast by late 1809 and had "long" traded for pigs and potatoes at Otago Harbour by 1810, the year in which hostilities broke out there been Māori and Pākehā in the thirteen-year-long feud called the Sealers' War.

In 1809 Robert Murray witnessed the cultivation of potatoes in the Foveaux Strait area, and when Captain Fowler anchored at Otago Harbour the locals already grew potatoes – which they wanted to exchange for iron. The pattern of Māori settlement may have changed over time to take advantage of the Tongata Bulla — people of the boats – and the new goods. In 1810 the Sydney Gazette described the Māori of Foveaux Strait as "particularly friendly" and anxious to swap potatoes for iron tools. The Ngāi Tahu lived around Otago and wanted to trade, but in their inexperience of the Tongata Bulla remained too truculent. Fowler never discovered this. Before coming to Otago Harbour he had visited the west coast, where six of his Lascar seamen deserted. Later, at Stewart Island, he sent an open boat under Robert Brown to search for them. Brown cruised up the east coast, touched at Cape Saunders on the Otago Peninsula before continuing north to a point 8 miles (13 km) north of Moeraki. There a group of Māori, incensed by an earlier incident on Otago Harbour in 1810, set upon and eventually killed Brown's whole party. These early contacts left a number of Pākehā (non-Māori people) living in the south: James Caddell an English boy-sealer captured from the Sydney Cove in 1810; three Lascars (Indian seamen), survivors of the deserting six from the Matilda, one of them called by Māori "Te Anu". In 1815 William Tucker settled at Whareakeake, later Murdering Beach, where he kept goats and sheep, had a Māori wife and apparently fostered an export trade in greenstone hei-tiki. After a time he left and returned on the Sophia, a Hobart Town sealer commanded by James Kelly.

In 1817 Kelly anchored in Otago Harbour. The local chief Korako failed to ferry over Māori from Whareakeake who wanted to receive their share of Tucker's gifts. When Kelly, Tucker and five others later went in an open boat along the coast to Whareakeake, the Māori there attacked them, killing Tucker and two others because of this slight, but also because of the general souring of relations since the incident of 1810. Kelly and the remainder retreated to the Sophia, only to find it occupied by Māori, intent – they believed – on attacking them. Armed with sealing knives, the Tongata Bulla drove the invaders off, resisted another attack, then destroyed "all their navy" and burnt "the beautiful city of Otago". The death toll remains much disputed, but while Kelly probably exaggerated the extent of his revenge, it seems likely he killed several people wholly innocent of the killing of his men.

Māori/Pākehā relations – peaceful from the time of Cook's visit and through the first sealing boom from 1792 to 1797 – soured with the theft of a red shirt, a knife and other articles by a chief Te Wahia from the Sydney Cove on the Otago Harbour late in 1810 – and by his killing by an angered sealer. From this there ensued the Sealers' War a series of attacks and counter-attacks, carried out by persons who soon lost sight of the original cause. Māori killed four men from the schooner The Brothers (massacred at Molyneux Harbour); several sailors from the General Gates, and three lascars from the brig Matilda. The feud continued until 1823 when Captain Edwardson succeeded in ending it, thus sparking a new sealing boom desired by both Māori and Pākehā.

Edwardson, sent from Sydney in the Mermaid to investigate the prospects for a flax-industry, explained Māori truculence in terms of their "vindictive", "crafty" and "lying" character which, he opined, made them "sensitive to the slightest offence". But Edwardson realised that the Māori wanted to trade. With the assistance of Caddell, whom he took to Sydney, he negotiated a truce with the Māori. The attacks and lower prices for skins had dampened the trade, but the restoration of peace saw its brief revival.

In the ensuing peace even the "unpredictably ferocious" Otago harbour Māori modified their behaviour in the interests of trade. Their kin at Ruapuke not only held their traditional monopoly over the sooty shearwaters, or New Zealand muttonbirds, but had effectively monopolised te tongata bulla and its wealth. Some 15 to 20 Europeans, many of them with Māori wives, lived on Codfish Island although they moved freely among the Māori kaiks on the mainland. These Europeans complied with Māori customs for fear of triggering that much-feared "touchiness". The Journal of John Boultbee, a sealer in the Otago region during the late 1820s, provides ample illustration. On one occasion he went to gather some vegetables which grew wild:

But my cannibal friends told me they were taboo (Tapu, meaning sacred), and I had to throw them away as they had been gathered from a place where a house had been built. Another time I happened to lay my knife on Tiroa's cap [Tiroa being Taiaroa, a chief from the Otago harbour area], on this he took the knife & kept it 2 or 3 days, saying it was taboo taboo. I was therefore obliged to eat with my fingers.

Boultbee did not understand the "strange custom of tabooing", but he recognised that "any willful breach of it considered a serious matter, & in severe cases punishable by death". The security of the intruders depended upon the goodwill of the paramount rangatira in Murihiku, Te Whakataupuka. The son of Honegai, who had harried the Tongata Bulla wherever he could, Te Whakataupuka proved less truculent and more skilful in manipulating the new arrivals. He became the first to recognise the strategic importance of Ruapuke: he shifted from the mouth of the Matua-a to make his home on the island. Te Whakataupuka impressed John Boultbee as "the most complete model of strength, activity & elegance I had seen combined in any man". He placed the Europeans under his chiefly protection and at times played and joked with them freely. Limits existed to this familiarity. Once, when a group of Pākehā engaged in a mock battle with the chief, one accidentally hit his head with a potato (the head of the chief being tapu). This "excited him suddenly & caused him to seize a tremendous log of wood, which he threw at them...." Cooling quickly, he told them to desist lest he should "perhaps get vexed & hurt them, which he would be sorry to do". When Te Whakataupuka's son, who preferred to live with the Europeans, died, Boultbee and his companions feared that Te Whakataupuka might hold them responsible for the boy's death. Despite his grief the rangatira refused to allow his warriors to exact revenge.

The various hapu at Otago from the early 1820s until the 1850s had as their chiefs Tahatu, Karetai and Taiaroa. Unlike Te Whakataupuka and his nephew, Tūhawaiki, who became the paramount rangatira in 1834, neither Taiaroa nor Karetai earned renown for physical feats or for warrior habits. Tensions existed between them. Karetai functioned as the local chief, but Taiaroa, who had close kinship ties with the Canterbury Ngāi Tahu, had been given land on the western side of the harbour where he established a small settlement. When Europeans began visiting regularly he moved his village to the eastern side, close by Karetai's, to muscle in on the trade. Trade had increased rapidly. In 1823 Kent noted only three villages within the harbour; in 1826 Captain Herd reported five. The Otago harbour Māori prospered and Boultbee recorded the arrival at Ruapuke of a boat from Otago laden with '2 large fat hogs & 100 baskets of potatoes each weighing 35 lb (16 kg)' For this they received two muskets and one adze.

=== The Musket Wars ===
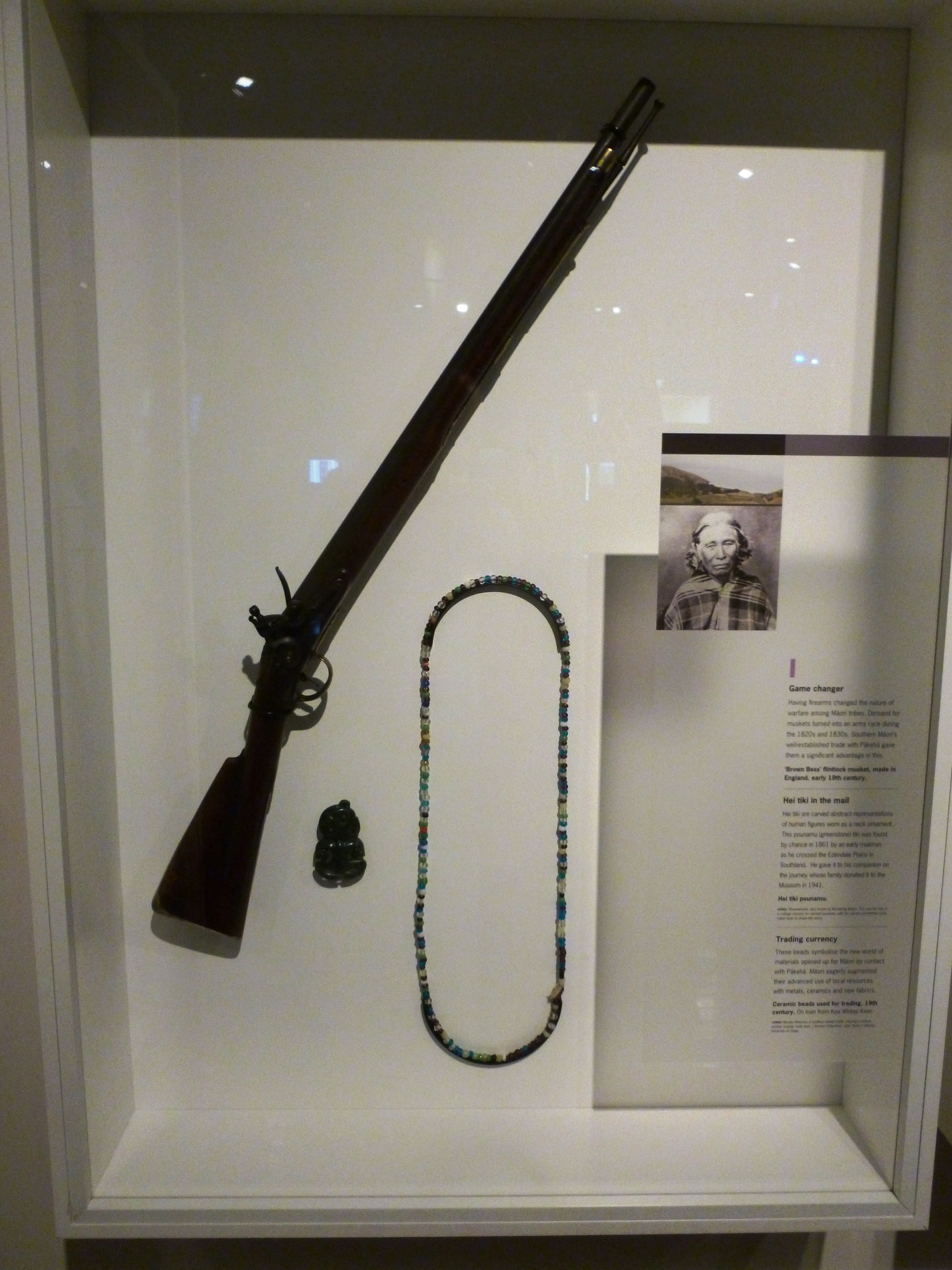
Musket (Brown Bess) in use throughout the Musket Wars in New Zealand.

==== Campaigns in Canterbury ====
European contact seems to have played a role in the resumption of internecine warfare. In the North Island tribes in close contact with Pākehā had acquired muskets by the 1820s. Similarly, in the South Island Māori early acquired European firearms which they used on their relations in the Kai Huaka struggle ("Eat-relations" feud). Fortunately for the South, the feud did not spread to what would later become the territory of the Otago Province, and though petty quarrels between the Otago and Murihiku natives occurred from time to time, open warfare never took place. The Kai Huaka troubles began in Canterbury. A woman named Murihaka tried on a dog-skin cloak belonging to Tama-i-hara-nui, a chief. Some members of Tama-i-hara-nui's hapū, exasperated by this sacrilegious act, killed the servant of Hape, a friend of Murihaka's. Hape's whanau, finding the retribution excessive, killed some members of the whānau which had avenged the original presumptuous act. This whanau took utu by killing Hape himself. Hape's wife then took refuge with her brothers at Taumutu and they in turn killed three prominent members of yet another whanau. By now, most of the Māori of Banks Peninsula had become involved. The dynamic is simple enough. If one Māori offended another, the aggrieved party's whanau or hapu was obliged to exact an appropriate penalty. In most quarrels this often ended matters unless, as in this case, the penalty seemed excessive. Meanwhile, Tama-i-hara-nui sought aid from kin at Kaiapoi and successfully attacked Taumutu. The Hapu at Taumutu, which included Taiaroa's sister, sent another woman, Hinehaka, who had close ties with several southern chiefs to ask for help. Taiaroa mobilised a large Taua (war party) which headed north in canoes. Taiaroa also had kin among the hapu he intended to attack so he went ahead, warned the enemy, then returned to lead the assault. At Wairewa on Banks Peninsula, the southerners won an unsatisfyingly bloodless victory. Fearful of being met by taunts and jeers on returning home, they killed a kinsman of Taununu, a powerful rangatira from Kaikōura who had settled near his kin at Kaiapoi and controlled Rapaki, a large pa in Lyttelton harbour. Utu, which involved revenge, was producing a bloodbath.

Taununu led a successful taua south, and Te Whakataupuka now decided to intervene. He and Taiaroa organised a war-party and headed north to seek vengeance. As the southern taua approached their enemy, Taiaroa again went ahead to warn his kin: "Escape! Fly for your lives! Take your canoes out to sea! We have guns." This time the enemy moved too slowly. According to survivors of the vanquished hapu, the southern warriors defeated two canoes overcrowded with helpless fugitives.

The triumphant warriors from Otago, Ruapuke, and the villages around Foveaux Strait proceeded north to Ripapa, Taununu's pa. After destroying the pa the southern warriors evacuated the entire population of Taumutu and brought them south. Tama-i-hara-nui later followed and persuaded most of them to return home, where he finally took his revenge. The fighting continued spasmodically until 1828, but the southerners took no further part in it.

==== Ngāti Toa invasions ====
In 1829, Te Whakataupuka sold 60 acres (240,000 m^{2}) of land at Preservation Inlet to the whaler, Peter Williams, on payment of sixty muskets, 1,000 lb (450 kg) of gunpowder, 1,000 lb (450 kg) of musket balls, two 12 lb (5.4 kg) cannonades, two air-guns, and a large quantity of tobacco, pipes, spades and hooks. This increased the armament of southern Māori and facilitated the establishment of the South Island's first whaling station. (In what became the historical province of Otago it was next followed by the Weller brothers' on Otago Harbour in 1831.)

By 1830 the old threat of the invasion of the South Island by the warlike tribes of the north again appeared menacing when Te Rauparaha, chief of the Ngāti Toa, invaded the South and stormed the kāinga (unfortified village) of Takapūneke at Akaroa Harbour and took the paramount chief, Tama-i-hara-nui, hostage. A year later he organised a grand attack on Kaiapoi, the chief centre of the Kāi Tahu in Canterbury, and laid siege to it. A strong relieving force of Otago warriors, led by Taiaroa, marched hurriedly into the beleaguered pa, slipped past Te Rauparaha and entered it by night. After a long defence in which he played a leading part, Taiaroa, seeing the hopelessness of the position, escaped with his men to Otago harbour, now the tribal stronghold of Kāi Tahu, to prepare a counter-stroke.

In response to Te Rauparaha's first attack in which he conquered and massacred the northern part of the South Island, 350 well-armed warriors, led by Te Whakataupuka and Taiaroa marched northwards and overtook the retreating Ngāti Toa warriors at Te Koko-o-Kupe / Cloudy Bay, near Cook Strait. Here Taiaroa and another young chief, Tūhawaiki, seized Te Rauparaha, only to have the wily chief slip out of his cloak and dive into the sea. He then swam to his canoes. The Kāi Tahu claimed a victory; the Ngāti Toa retorted that they had successfully evaded the ambush. The subsequent skirmish at sea proved inconclusive, except that Te Rauparaha escaped. In 1835 Taiaroa, again accompanied by Tūhawaiki who, on Te Whakataupuka's death in that year, had become the paramount chief of Murihiku, organised another large expedition of four hundred men which once more inflicted severe losses upon the Ngāti Toa and their prestige, with that of their chief, had suffered considerably in these encounters with the warriors of southern New Zealand.

Māori belligerence made pākehā nervous and emphasised the tenuousness of trade. In August 1834, the captain of the Lucy Ann reported in Sydney that the Māori living beside the Weller brothers' whaling station on Otago harbour now treated the pākehā there with the greatest contempt, talked of wiping out all pākehā, and took what they wanted. Their "insolence" grew so much, one captain complained, that "they take from us whatever suits their fancy, such as our clothing. and food from off our very plates – help themselves to oil, in such quantities as they require...". Four captains of whaling vessels complained:

"a powerful tribe of one or two thousand natives from the Southward, under a chief called Taiaroa... are at war with the tribes of the straits, and last year destroyed fifty tons of barrels, and some oil with the huts and the property..."

Their own Māori patrons refused to or could not protect them.

Disease now tipped the balance. In September 1835 measles and influenza spread among the southern Kāi Tahu and carried off, most notably, Te Whakataupuka. It remains unclear how many died. One European said that the hapu at the mouth of the Tokomairaro River owned nine canoes, but had enough men to crew only one. The whalers often attributed to disease a marked decline in Māori numbers.

But the last act in the intertribal war had not yet taken place. In 1836 Te Puoho, a kinsman of Te Rauparaha, tried to persuade the ageing warrior to march once more against the people of Otago harbour and Murihiku. Te Rauparaha refused and said: "It is easy to burst the tree at the root (Kaiapoi), but harder to burst it at the branches (Murihiku)." "He must not expect the people in the south to be sitting in trees with their breasts open like pigeons facing the sun." Te Rauparaha may have given an official blessing, conditional upon victory. At any rate, in the summer of 1836, Te Puoho led his war-party, about seventy in number, down the West Coast as far as the Awarua River, toiled painfully and crossed the mountains through today's Haast Pass — a miracle of endurance — and, half-famished, moved down the valley of the Makarora River and captured a village at Wānaka. The invaders then proceeded up the Cardrona Valley, crossed the Crown Range and the Kawarau River, using a natural rock bridge, then finally, by following the Nevis and Nokomai Rivers, entered the enemy's heartland, Murihiku. After a short rest to recuperate, they pushed on along the old Māori track that ran over the low hills west of Gore and, soon after crossing the Mataura River, the party reached Tuturau and sacked the village. Unfortunately for the invaders, the whole south soon became aware of the invasion, for Te Pūoho did not know that the news of his presence had, despite precautions, been taken to Tūhawaiki at Ruapuke. Nor would he have known that Taiaroa was visiting the island. The two chiefs hastily assembled a force of between 70 and 100 men. The whalers transported the warriors to the mainland. The local pākehā, 'in a state of considerable alarm', prepared to flee at a moment's notice. The unsuspecting Ngāti Toa slept at Tuturau while the Kāi Tahu surrounded the village. During the night, the Kāi Tahu tohunga summoned up the pulsing heart of Te Puoho, a favourable omen, and in the morning the Kāi Tahu quickly defeated the invaders, killing Te Pūoho. Taiaroa intervened to save the lives of some of his kin who had helped him to escape Te Rauparaha's clutches during the Siege of Kaiapoi in 1833. At Ruapuke, Bluff and Otago the pākehā and the Kāi Tahu celebrated their triumph with enthusiasm and relief.

Thus ignominiously ended the invasion, memorable as the last act of inter-Māori warfare in the South Island. In January 1838, Tūhawaiki and Taiaroa made a sudden march to Queen Charlotte Sound, and in December of the following year, led another war-party in sixteen sealing and four whaling boats, but Te Rauparaha, still smarting from his former humiliations, never again faced the southern warriors. Although these excursions constituted little more than a dramatic demonstration of Kāi Tahu rights over Banks Peninsula, they proved that, once and for all, the southerners had overcome their fear of the northerners.

=== Ngāi Tahu and Christianity ===
Tuhawaiki had become the paramount rangatira of the Ngāi Tahu and played a decisive role in shaping the future of his people. Born at Taununu, at the mouth of the Matua-a (or Clutha), around 1805 as a nephew of Te Whakataupuka, Tuhawaiki had direct descent from Hautapu-nui-o-tu and from Honekai; he also had an impeccable Ngati Mamoe lineage and close kin-ties with such prominent Pākehā as James Cadell and John Kelly. He had won great mana in both worlds. He had a well-established reputation as a harpooner and sailor, he had an intimate knowledge of Pākehā customs, and in the long campaign against Te Rauparaha he had enhanced his mana. Like his uncle he understood the value of the Pākehā presence and placed them under his mana. Even the truculent Taiaroa obeyed. Unlike his uncle, Tuhawaiki realised that his people could only survive the expansion of European society by borrowing more extensively. He owned a trading ship, built himself a Pākehā house, and dressed like a Pākehā. He encouraged agriculture, traded widely, and appears to have blessed Jones's attempt to colonise the Waikouaiti region. He must also have recognised that the Pākehā presence afforded additional protection against Te Rauparaha. Most Pākehā agreed that he was shrewd, wily and knowledgeable, 'probably one of the most Europeanised Māori...most correctly and completely dressed in white man's clothes, even to the refinement of the cotton pocket handkerchief.'

Tuhawaiki doubtless realised that whaling had transformed the world of his people. Many kaiks or villages moved to the vicinity of the whaling-stations (although some may represent foundations by refugees from the Ngāti Toa). Large numbers of Māori men worked in the whaling stations while many women lived in de facto marriages with Pākehā men. These Māori joined one of the lowest strata of European society, characterised by violence and drunkenness. Observers like Shortland thought relations between the two races were often very good at the whaling stations. Probably no other tribe in New Zealand was so extensively intermarried with and involved in Pākehā society. Possibly nowhere else was the Pākehā so willing to tolerate or adopt Māori customs. Most of the Māori living in the whaling stations dressed like Europeans and during the 1830s acquired an addiction for tobacco and alcohol. But in this they did not differ from the whalers.

Tuhawaiki adopted a threefold strategy for coping with the new world. Firstly, he encouraged the development of skills appropriate to the emergent world of Pākehā and Māori. Secondly, he clearly envisaged the peaceful integration of these two worlds on terms acceptable to the Māori. And thirdly, he recognised the importance of Pākehā religion and the power of the Pākehā Atua (or God). Tuhawaiki, widely travelled and knowledgeable in the ways of the Pākehā, possibly ascribed to the Pākehā Atua the role of unifying the two peoples. In accepting James Watkin, the Methodist parson at Waikouaiti, and yet inviting another missionary to Ruapuke, he may have responded to the conversion of his own followers. In any case he travelled to Waikouaiti to hear Watkin's first sermon, asked for a missionary to be sent to Ruapuke, and extended a warm and hospitable welcome to visiting clergy.

During the 1830s Christianity had caught on through much of the North Island. Slaves of the Ngā Puhi in Northland first accepted the Gospel. The news spread fast. Weariness of war, the mana of the Bible, and a passion for literacy fuelled the fire. Māori teachers, often self-taught, carried the Word far beyond the zones of the European missionaries. The magic of literacy most dramatically expressed the power of the Pākehā atua. Bibles, or a few pages from any book, represented a new magic which Māori believed could protect its owner from death in battle, bestow eternal life, ward off sickness, and thus complement the power of traditional karakia (or incantations). Ngāi Tahu sailors must have heard the Word. Northern converts such as Te Rauparaha's son, brought the new Word south. When Watkin arrived at Waikouaiti he found ready a Māori market for his spiritual wares. A large crowd attended his first service and listened attentively "tho' they could not understand anything that was said". When he printed some Bibles, 'they were eagerly sought after'.

Pākehā magic and the mana that one could win by possessing its secret persuaded the southern Māori to turn, in their own way and for their own reasons, to Christianity. When Wohlers arrived at Ruapuke the tohunga karakia (or priests) welcomed him as a comrade and explained their theology. The chiefs, led by Tuhawaiki, also adopted the new faith and sponsored traditional Ngāi Tahu teachers for baptism. The tohunga karakia quickly accepted certain elements of the Christian faith, but they, like the young men of inherited mana who patronised Watkin's school, wanted to adapt the new Gospel to the old karakia. These men also wanted to achieve mana as teachers of the Pākehā magic and quickly voiced resentment when the Pākehā tohunga started to baptise everyone. Wohlers discovered that both Watkin and Bishop Selwyn had complied with this pressure and for a while the Māori teachers so arranged matters that "applicants [for Baptism] had to go to them in order to be recommended".

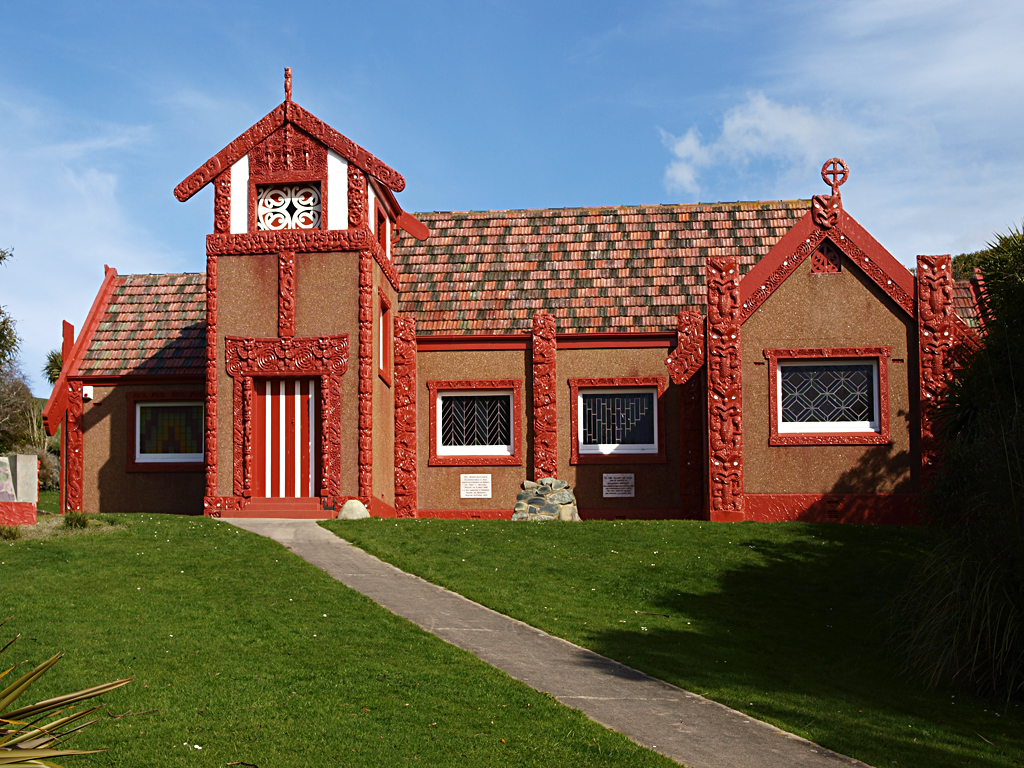
Church from Otakou, Dunedin, New Zealand, build in 1941 to replace an earlier church built in 1865.

The Pākehā missionaries then realised that their mana as teachers depended on the number of converts they made. Watkin's register of baptisms records the explosive result. In 1841, he baptised two Māori (one of them intended marrying a Pākehā); in 1842 he baptised three Māori; and then in 1843 he baptised 193 and another 158 before leaving in 1844. As many missionaries realised, the Māori transformed Christianity in the process of 'conversion'. To the despair of Watkin, the Māori interpreted the Christian karakia in their own way. Much to the dismay of the practical Wohlers, the strict moral code of the Old Testament proved infectious. When Selwyn preached a 'sermon on contentment with one's lot' the Māori stopped producing food and trade with American whalers fell off abruptly; "the pigs ate the potatoes, the Māori ate the pigs, and there was nothing left".

At Waikouaiti and Moeraki the Māori refused to work on Sundays. Not only did the Māori shape the Christian message to their own beliefs, but they found in the denominational structure a familiar world. The different churches proved perfect instruments for sustaining traditional rivalries and animosities while learning Pākehā ways. Because the Ngāti Toa became Anglican, most of the prominent Ngāi Tahu joined the Wesleyans. Some villages acknowledged the mana of each denomination's Atua. Very small kaiks sometimes built two churches and two schools and the chief at Moeraki made part of his hapu Catholic, part Anglican, and part traditional. Among the Māori the generosity and mana of the Pākehā tohunga counted for much. The Roman Catholic Bishop, Jean Baptiste Pompallier visited the south in 1840, and poor Watkin watched his flock transfer allegiance to the Papist. The worried Wesleyan confided in his journal: "Their mode of worship and wonderful legends would lead me to fear that Popery would prevail over Protestantism". The local Māori, probably with a strong leavening of northern refugees, flocked to the new tohunga. His robes and vestments attracted much favourable comment, the pomp of Catholic ritual and liturgy impressed, and some Māori told Watkin to his face that they regretted his 'plain dress and equally plain mode of conducting religious worship'. Pompallier baptised freely, unlike the prudent Protestants, and responded with tolerance to Māori dance and tattooing. To Watkin's horror, Bishop Pompallier even told the local Māori that Hine, the wife of Maui, was the Virgin Mary. The Catholic Church lacked the resources to capitalise upon the Bishop's success and the Wesleyans, left to themselves, regained the lost ground. But allegiances remained volatile. When Selwyn, walking south, swam a flooded river, an entire village joined his church.

== European colonisation and New Zealand's leading province (1840–1900) ==
The Treaty did not at first have much significance in Otago, the Crown even initially declared the area uninhabited so as to make its signing irrelevant. However land-sales and European immigration plans occurred in its wake, making the treaty a turning point in Otago's History.

=== Land sales and the signing of the Treaty of Waitangi ===
In the 1830s and 1840s the Māori of Otago and Murihiku, possibly anxious for a strong Pākehā presence, agreed to sell many of their traditional lands. Back in 1833, a further sale of Murihiku land had taken place when Joseph Weller acquired from Te Whakataupuka the whole of Te Picamoke (Stewart Island) and two adjacent islands for one hundred pounds.

In 1838, Tuhawaiki, accompanied by four chiefs, visited Sydney and sold enormous tracts of land "with all the solemnity of archaic phraseology and legal circumlocution". Sydney speculators pursued the golden future with an enthusiasm which increased in intensity with the prospect of British annexation of New Zealand. On 14 January 1840, Governor George Gipps of New South Wales issued a proclamation forbidding future sales, unless to the Crown, and warned that commissioners would investigate all titles already claimed and that, where appropriate, Crown grants would validate them. One month later, on 15 February 1840 during a second visit to Sydney, Tuhawaiki, Karetai and three subordinate chiefs, Kaikoarare, Taikawa and Poneke signed an agreement which "sold" the "Island of Te Waipounamu, also called the Middle Island of new Zealand, also the island called Stewarts island... together with all seas, harbours, coasts, bays, inlets, rivers, lakes, waters, mines, minerals, fisheries, woods, forests, liberties, franchises, profits, hereditaments... save and except such portions of the said island as have been already disposed of.. . and also the island of Robuchi". The purchase was made partly by cash payments and partly by annuities. Tuhawaiki signed for "One hundred pounds of lawful British money and an annuity of fifty pounds a year during the term of his natural life." Hence by February 1840, every acre in Otago and Murihiku, as indeed in the entire South Island, had apparently been alienated by the Māori to hopeful speculators who gambled on receiving from the Crown some title commensurate with the expenses they alleged had been incurred.

The highly questionable nature of these transactions became more evident after Captain William Hobson arrived at the Bay of Islands on 29 January 1840 to win from the Māori allegiance to the British Crown. Then followed two proclamations, the second stating that Her Majesty could not acknowledge as valid any titles of land which were not derived from, or confirmed by the Crown. After the northern chiefs had signed the Treaty, Captain Nias set sail for the south in HMS Herald on 29 April and it was not until June that British sovereignty over the South Island was proclaimed on Stewart Island. On 9 June HMS Herald called at Ruapuke and Major Thomas Bunbury, who was collecting signatures for the Treaty of Waitangi, recorded that "Tuhawaiki, who had recently returned from Sydney enriched by the spoils of commerce, came on board in full dress staff uniform of a British aide-de-camp, with gold laced trousers and cocked hat and plume in which he looked extremely well, accompanied by a native dress sergeant dressed in a corresponding costume." Tuhawaiki signed the Treaty without hesitation, his example being followed by Kakoura and Taiaroa who were also at Ruapuke at the time. Tuhawaiki also had a bodyguard of 20 men, all dressed in British uniforms, although they refused to wear boots.

=== Scottish settlement scheme ===
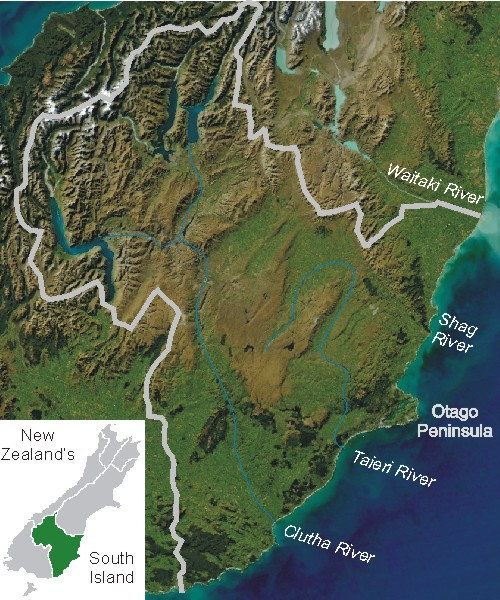
Otago (1840–1900), inland mountains and high plains with flatter land near the coast. The boundary of the Otago Region (1989–today) is shown in gray.

The New Zealand Company purchased the Otago block from Ngāi Tahu dignitaries on 31 July 1844 for £2,400 and gained legal title in 1847, opening the way for large-scale European settlement in Otago on Wakefield lines. The settlement was planned to be named New Edinburgh but instead the local name Otago (a variant of Ōtākou) was used. George Rennie and William Cargill, both from Scotland, along with the Free Church of Scotland were the initial backers of the settlement. The Free Church had split from the Church of Scotland in 1843 in protest at landowners having power over the nomination of ministers.

The first wave of settlement arrived in 1848 on two ships from Greenock on the Firth of Clyde. The John Wickliffe arrived in April, and the Philip Laing arrived three weeks later with twice the passengers. Early immigrants came from Scotland's lowlands as the worst of the highland clearances had occurred decades before. The land of Dunedin had already been divided up and settlers had drawn lots in Scotland to define the picking order. About half of the 12,000 immigrants who were to follow in the 1850s were from the Free Church.

William Cargill (first superintendent 1853–1860) and Thomas Burns (both Scottish) were the leaders of the new settlement, however, a number of Englishmen also had positions of power. John Turnbull Thomson was an English surveyor at this time and named many of Otago's landmarks. Otago's other coastal port, Oamaru, was laid out in 1858 and its streets were named after British rivers. Some settlers arrived as assisted immigrants. James McNeil, on the site of Balclutha and the Provincial Government established a ferry service across the Clutha in 1857.

The mores of the settlement included a mix of conservative values from the free church, such as the Sabbath Ordinance enforcing no games or work on Sunday, and the decadence of a new colony. At this time free primary education was introduced and Otago started its long debate about the consumption of alcohol.

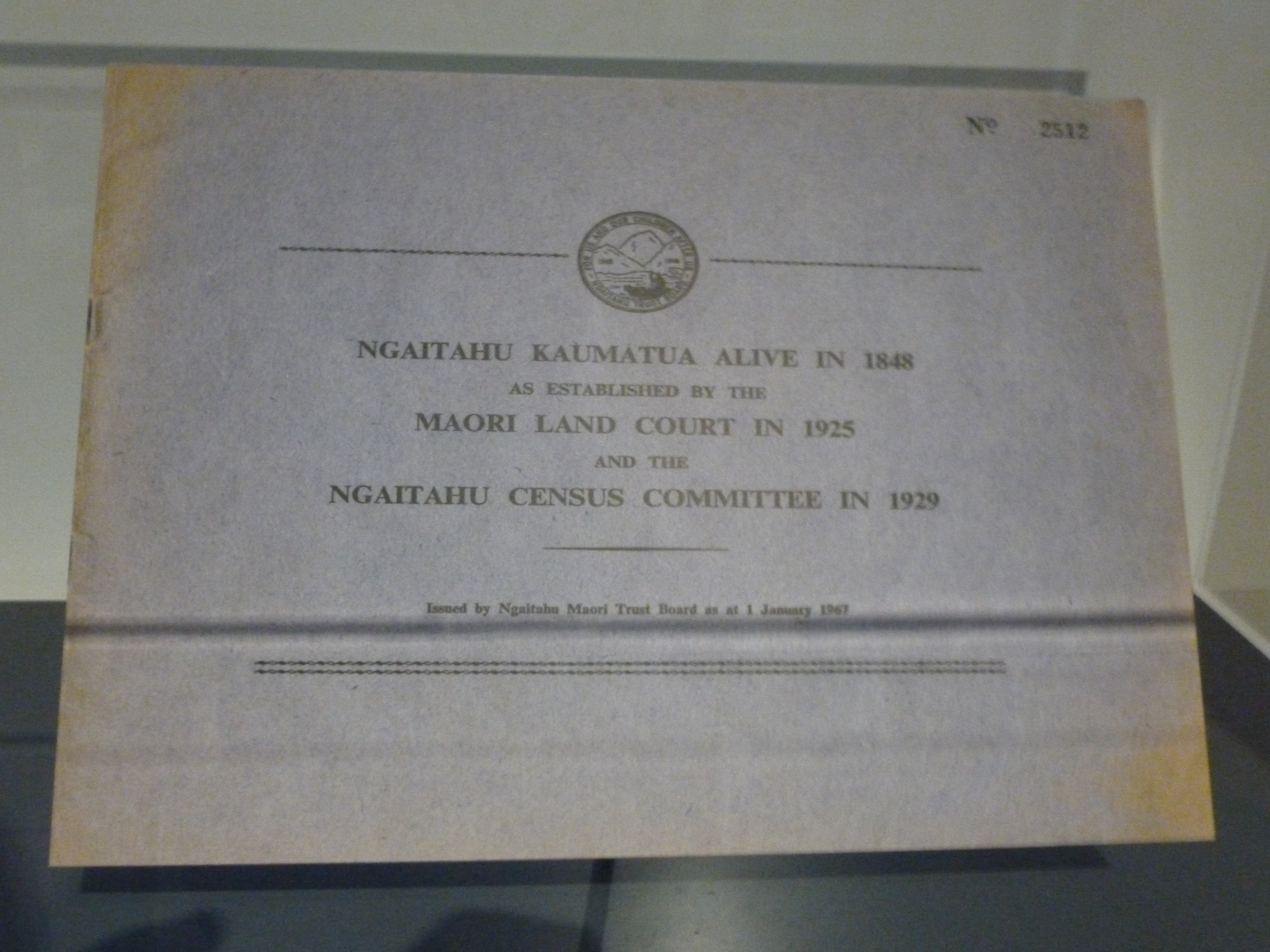
'The Blue Book', showing Ngāi Tahu alive in 1848

Most agricultural exports were sold to south-east Australia during their gold rush. Sheep farming was introduced, with half a million sheep by 1861. Land was commonly leased to farmers and wages were higher than in Scotland. Some of the run holders began to venture inland to create large stations around Lake Wakatipu and Wānaka. However central Otago would not be fully colonised until after the Otago gold rush.

By 1849 Ngāi Tahu was starting to feel that the Crown had defaulted on its obligations under the Treaty of Waitangi. This included those in Otago, and resulted in a claim being made against the Crown. The claim cited three main areas where the Crown had failed to fulfill its obligations: building schools and hospitals, setting aside 10% of the land as reserve and providing access to food gathering resources. Ngāi Tahu took the case to court in 1868 but no decision could be reached, in part due to a lack of political will by the Crown. The claim was to continue to be unresolved for more than hundred years and by the end of the century fewer than 2,000 Ngāi Tahu lived on tribal land.

=== Gold rush period (1861–1870) ===
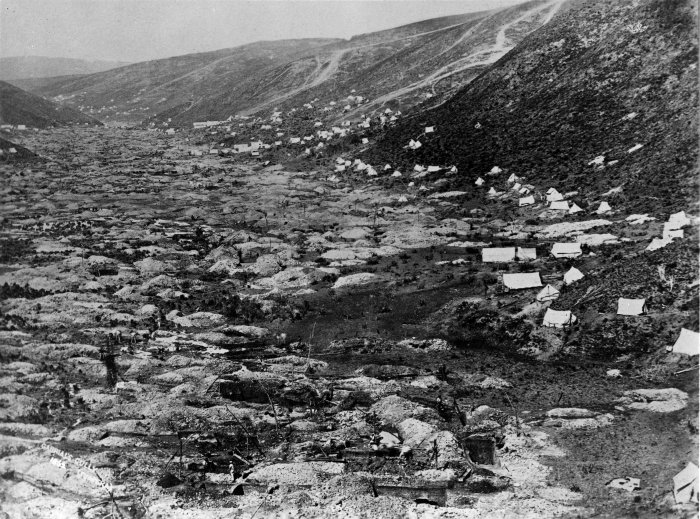
Gabriel's Gully during the height of the gold rush in 1862.

While of no direct value to Māori, gold was highly prized by Europeans as a means of exchange and in the production of jewellery. Therefore, when it was first discovered by Europeans in Otago (near the modern town of Lawrence in 1861) it had a profound positive effect on the economy and immigration of the then tiny colony. The slightly earlier Lindis gold rush involved about 300 miners but was over in a few months. Dunedin soon became the largest city in New Zealand and transport networks and townships expanded into the interior.

In 1862 the gold rush expanded to across inland Otago to Cromwell and Arrowtown. Queenstown, originally a sheep station come hotel became a thriving town. In 1863 new finds were made closer to the coast in the Taieri River catchment. 1863 also saw the peak of the gold rush, with about 22,000 people living in the gold fields. In the 1860s Otago earned £10 million from gold but only £3.57 million from sheep. Water sluicing races extended the life of the diggings but also had a destructive effect on the landscape and soil. After 1864 there were no more discoveries drawing prospectors from overseas. In 1865 Dunedin's wealth and the disruptive wars in the North Island lead Otago to support a failed resolution in the General Assembly for independence from the North Island.

In 1866 Chinese immigrants came to Otago with the support of local businesses. They were to work in the gold mines and experienced legislated racism from other immigrants.

When New Zealand provinces were formed in 1853, the southern part of New Zealand belonged to Otago Province. Settlers in Murihiku, the southernmost part of the South Island purchased from Māori in 1853 by Walter Mantell, petitioned the government for separation from Otago. Petitioning started in 1857, and the province of Southland was proclaimed in 1861. As the new province of Southland started to accumulate debt by the late 1860s, it became part of the Otago Province again in 1870.

=== Refrigerated exports and development of the interior (1870–1900) ===
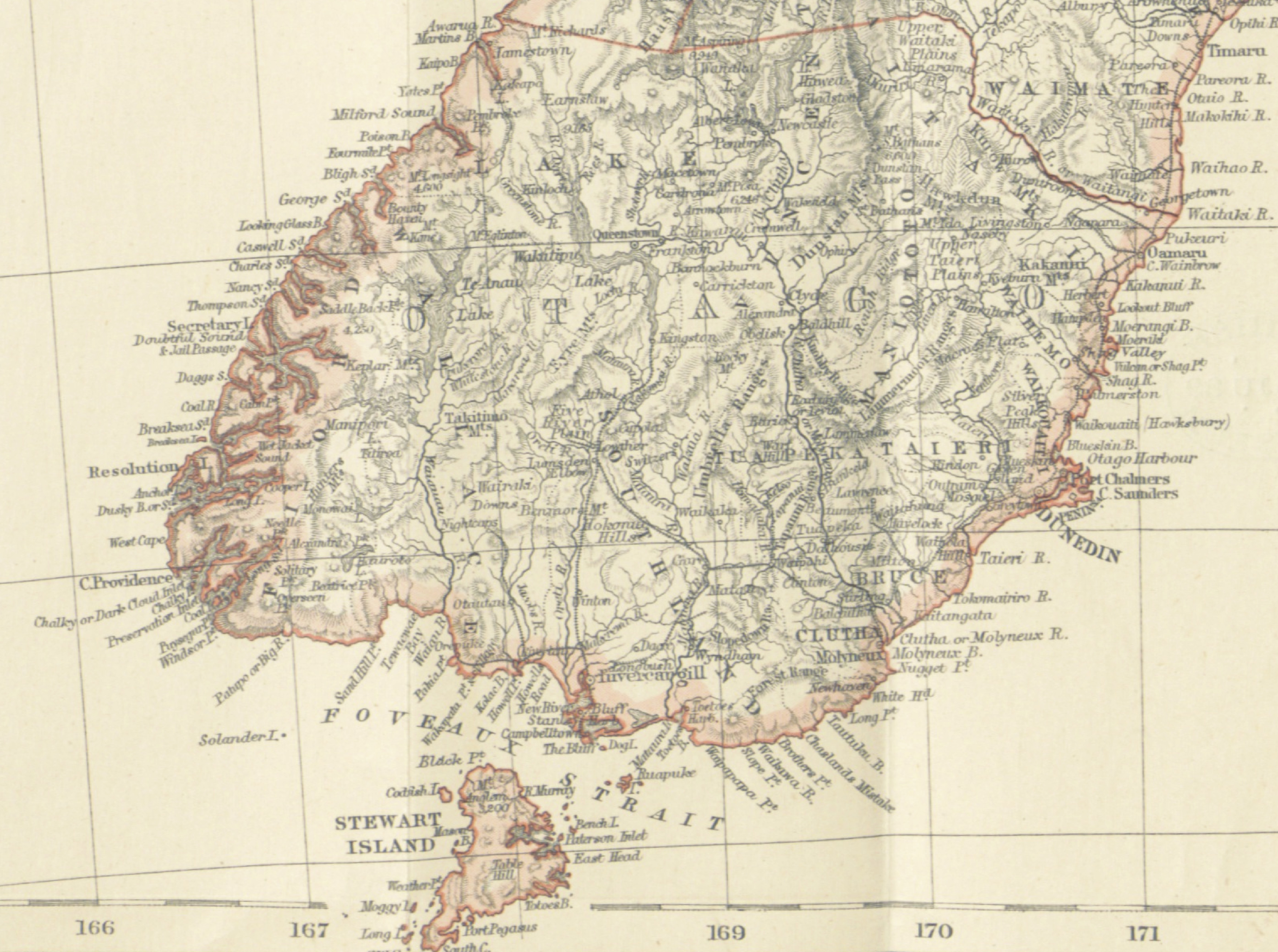
Otago Province (1852–1876) originally was all of New Zealand south of the Waitaki River.

Due to the gold rush, one quarter of New Zealanders lived in Otago by 1870 and one third of exports came from there. In 1881 Dunedin was New Zealand's largest urban centre. The gold mining population with many new Irish and English immigrants shifted the province away from Scottish dominance. The Long Depression was a worldwide economic recession, beginning in 1873 and running either through the spring of 1879, or 1896 depending on the metrics used. In Otago this came soon after the end of the Gold Rush, however by 1882 pastoralism and the associated frozen-meat industry was able to send refrigerated shipments to Britain. This lessened the effect of the depression and allowed for continued economic growth in Otago.

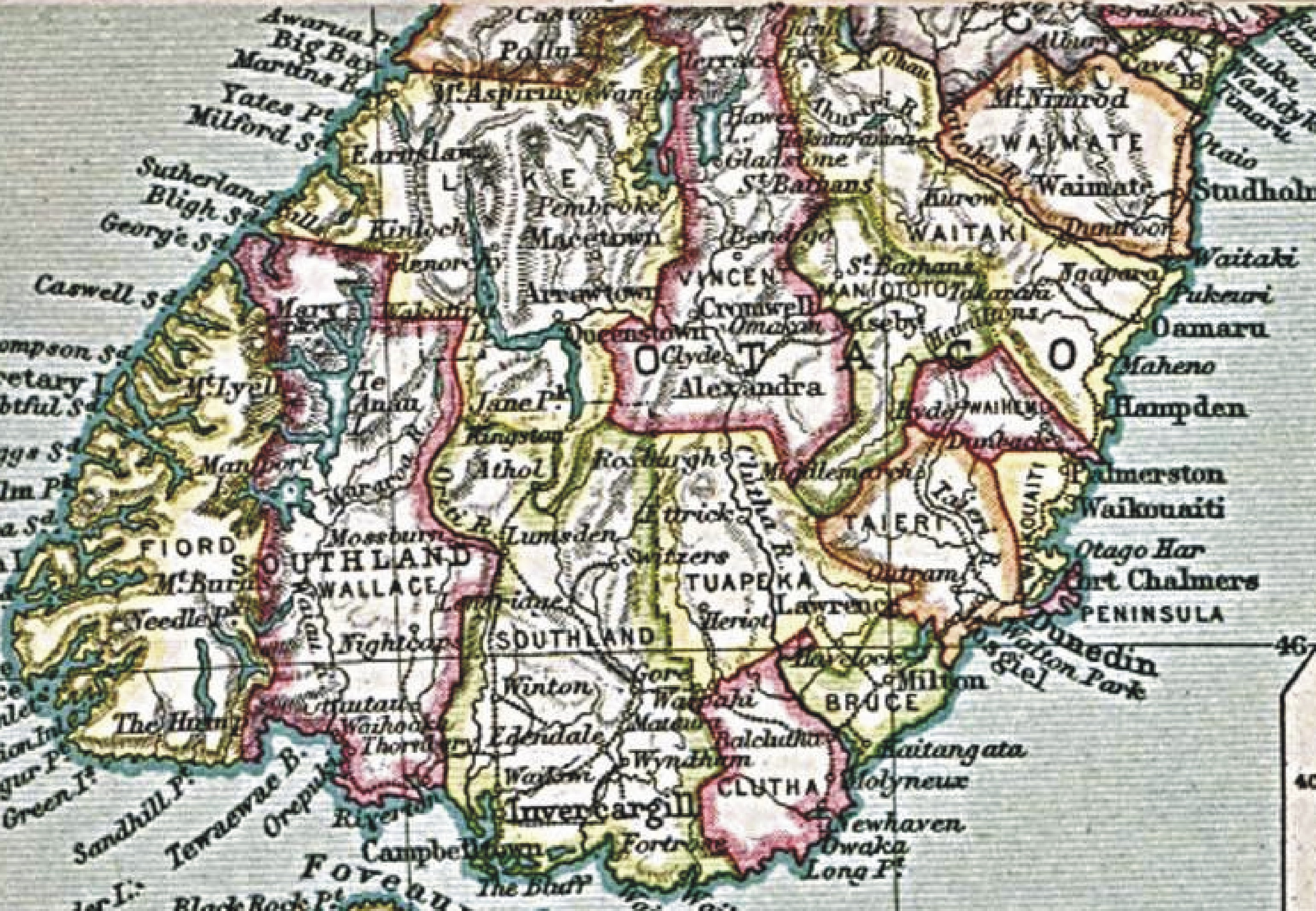
Map showing counties that Otago Province was split into between 1876 and 1989.

The main export product was wool and lamb. However, in the 1880s erosion, rabbits and scab caused problems for sheep farmers. The first refrigerated shipment to Britain was in 1882 and left Port Chalmers on the Dunedin. This led to meat-freezing works being established near Dunedin (Burnside) and in Oamaru and Balclutha (Finegand). The forced subdivision of Otago's large holding soon followed between 1895 and 1909 in North Otago 15 runs became 540 farms. The hot summers and cold winters were good for orcharding which developed in Central Otago from the late 19th century. In order to support agriculture a rail network was built throughout Otago. Starting in Dunedin in 1889, it reached Hyde by 1894, Clyde in 1907 and Cromwell in 1921. While the gold rush diminished, less labour-intensive gold mining became more common. From the 1880s quartz mining (instead of alluvium) became possible, while massive dredges continued to work the old deposits. These dredges also inspired the first hydro electric power station at Bullendale near Queenstown in 1886. This gold boom peaked between 1890 and 1900 but put a lot of individual prospectors out of business.

The 1893 Women's Suffrage Petition was the second of two mass petitions to the New Zealand Government in support of women's suffrage. About one third of Dunedin women signed the petition, a higher percentage than any other city.

=== The development of organised labour ===
From the late 1880s onwards worker activists and middle-class reformers investigated poor working conditions in Dunedin and around Otago. In 1889 New Zealand's first women's trade union (the Tailoresses) was founded in Dunedin after the release of the Sweating Commission, had shown that for women employed in the clothing factories 'sweating' was endemic.

Labour manifestos in the 1880s demanded the exclusion of Chinese as they were seen as working for low wages. In August 1890 the Maritime Council went on strike in sympathy with Australian maritime unionists. While most immigrants to the province were said to have been impressed by the environment around Dunedin, the reality was that the city did not have the infrastructure to sustain high numbers of working people and there was some protest by workers against these conditions, low wages and the high cost of rentals. A painter recently arrived from England, Samuel Shaw, took up the cause of the workers and after convening a public meeting and a petition to William Fox, eight hours was resolved as an acceptable workday. It has been said that artisans and labourers who arrived in Otago as immigrants would have expected to leave class differences in Britain, but by the 1880s industrial disputes across the country were creating a common identity for workers. The unskilled were previously not organised and when they had grievances with employers, these were usually settled informally. Skilled workers however, were seen as having had more autonomy and security within the community which meant they dominated the towns in Otago during the 1860s and 1870s. By the 1980s Dunedin was becoming an industrial, urbanised community, and in line with what was happening elsewhere in New Zealand, both skilled and unskilled workers were forming unions and the town had a Trades and Labour Council which was active in advocating for improved working conditions. In 1887 Samuel Lister a settler from Scotland who was a printer and engraver, established the Otago Workman, a weekly newspaper, [which he said] "would fearlessly take up the cause of the industrial classes, and advocate the rights of labour as against the selfish greed, and tyranny of unscrupulous capital", leading historian Erik Olssen to conclude that the paper "played a major role in shaping a sense of working-class identity...[and Lister]...helped shape the political platform and strategy of the fast-multiplying trade unions." On 28 October 1990, a large group of seaman lead workers from a range of trades across Dunedin in a demonstration of support for unions involved in the Maritime Strike of the same year. Although the strike was not successful, Olssen held that the expression of solidarity demonstrated "the speed with which an industrial working class [had] emerged", creating an event that would have been impossible five years previously.

As Dunedin confronted the changes of industrialisation between 1900 and 1910, research recorded that, built on profitable periods in the 1880s and 1890s, there was still a privileged business elite controlling the provincial economy of Otago. Unions and business were said to have combined in protesting what was seen as Government neglect of the region and there was a period in which the citizens rekindled a sense of pride in what they had achieved as Scottish pioneers. Another issue was the impact of localism on how authorities in Dunedin were able to systematically plan and implement basic infrastructure for the management of drainage, sewerage and drinking water. Once again there was some degree of unity in response to this and significantly the Trades Council and a socialist group, the Fabian Society, were able, with some success, to lobby the council to make changes. The influx of engineers with technological knowledge, people with skill in urban planning and those with medical expertise, was a major factor in contributing to the intervention of the national Government in local politics and some changes made at this level brought about improvement in fire-fighting services, public transport and the rationalisation of independent boroughs.

In 1894 Clutha went dry followed by the Oamaru district in 1905 and Bruce in 1922 and in 1917 6pm closing was introduced for pubs. Otago sent men to fight in the Boer War in South Africa. This was the first of many overseas military operations that mean from Otago took part in.

The region's early history included several disasters. Several major floods have occurred on the Clutha, most notably the "Hundred year floods" of 14–16 October 1878 and 13–15 October 1978. The 1878 flood is regarded as New Zealand's greatest known flood. During this, a bridge at Clydevale was washed downstream, where it collided with the Balclutha Road Bridge, destroying the latter. The South Otago town of Kaitangata was the site of a fatal coal mine disaster in 1879, and later in the same year a fire in central Dunedin killed 12 people, the deadliest fire in the colony to that time.

Bendix Hallenstein, came from Australia in the 1860s started his retail business in Queenstown and then Dunedin from the early 1880s. By the 1900s he was trading New Zealand wide. The first the New Zealand and South Seas Exhibition in 1889–90 was a high point of Dunedin economic and cultural importance. The large scale tourist potential of Otago had been acknowledged since at least the 1870s in McKay's Otago Almanac. With the building of the Dunedin to Kingston railway in the late 1870s this potential could be realised. By the early 1900s Summer tourism around Lake Wakatipu had been full established.

== Stagnation and renewal (1900–today) ==
In the early 20th century a number of events occurred that are traditionally seen as part of New Zealand's shift towards independence. New Zealand passed on a chance to become part of Australia in 1901. In 1907 the United Kingdom granted New Zealand "Dominion" status within the British Empire, the high death toll from the First World War and in 1920 New Zealand joined the League of Nations as a sovereign state. Other regions, particularly in the North Island, begin to overtake Otago's population and economic importance at this time.

=== The wars and depression (1900–1945) ===
Otago had a slow start to the new century, followed by two world wars and a depression. In 1920 sheep numbers in Otago were the same as in 1880, with rabbits, erosion and distance from world markets continuing to be a problem. Farming initially expanded rapidly into forested areas. However, many were uneconomic and returned to forest or scrub, in the Catlins particularly.

With the outbreak of the First World War the Otago Infantry Regiment was formed. Along with the Otago Mounted Rifles Regiment they served at Gallipoli in 1915, before being moved to the Western Front from 1916 until the end of the war. Eight hundred women formed the Otago and Southland's Women's Patriotic Association in 1914, which supported the overseas troops. Four thousand Otago men died during the war and when it ended and the troops returned the Spanish flu struck between September and November in 1918.

By 1923 Dunedin was New Zealand's fourth largest city and the opening of the Panama Canal (1914) had diverted global trade from the South Pacific. In response to this economic stagnation Dunedin launched the second New Zealand and South Seas International Exhibition in 1925. Dunedin grew slowly during this time with a slight decline during the depression, when Dunedin's population fell by 3,000 to 82,000.

The labour movement was slower to get organised in Otago than in other regions. During the Depression of the 1930s unemployed workers were sent to the gold workings in Otago and in exchange for 30 shillings a week could keep some of the gold they found. In the 1932 depression there were riots in Dunedin, stores and cars were vandalised, food packages then given to unemployed.

=== Feeding Britain and social change (1945–1973) ===
After the war, with Britain's demand for food and better farming practices, Otago experienced increased prosperity. This led to urban growth throughout Otago. Oamaru's population increased by 75%, Balclutha's doubled, and Alexandra's and Mosgiel's tripled. Dunedin's quickly returned to its pre-depression level. By 1946 there were 100 rabbit boards given the responsibility of controlling rabbits on farmland.

Large electric power stations were built on the Waitaki (Aviemore 1968) and Clutha (1956–62) rivers, and a container terminal at Port Chalmers (1971, first container shipment). More recent projects, however, were met with protest due to environmental concerns. The save Manapouri campaign from 1959 to 1972 and cost overruns on the Clyde Dam made future large projects more challenging. These projects did, however, lead to population growth in the surrounding towns,

In 1960 commercial jet boat rides started operating in the Queenstown area. This together with a rope tow on Coronet Peak (1947) and the building of hiking huts made the Queenstown and lakes district a centre for year-round tourism. In 1967 10pm closing came back in for pubs.

=== All alone in the world (1973–today) ===
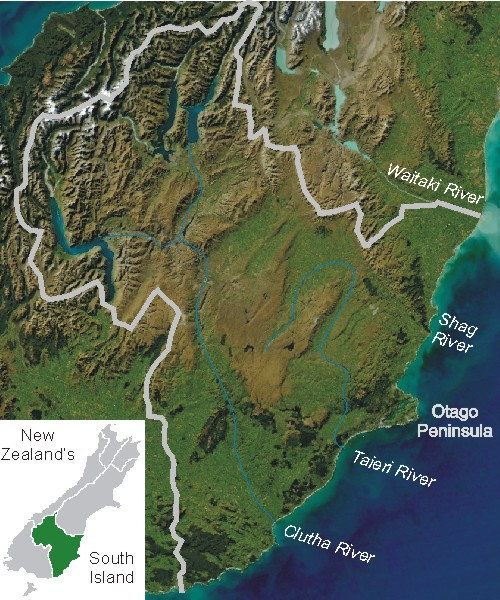
Otago, New Zealand (1900-today), inland mountains and high plains with flatter land near the coast. The boundary of the Otago Region (1989-today) is shown in gray.

Otago continued to export most of its produce to the United Kingdom until the 1970s. This began to change when the United Kingdom joined the European Community in 1973 and abrogated its preferential trade agreements with New Zealand. This, along with several international oil shocks and a reactionary government, led to severe economic disruption and hardship in Otago. The (centre-left) Labour government counter-intuitively opted for open market (neo-liberal) reforms to make New Zealand more competitive in the international market place. This led to a shift away from the primary sector. Woollen mills at Kaikorai Valley, Milton and Mosgiel closed in 1957, 1999 and 2000 respectively.

Several counties were amalgamated in 1989 to form the Otago local government region. This was smaller than the 19th-century Otago Province, which had included Fiordland and Stewart Island.

Queenstown's primary industry became tourism, including wine tasting and golf, and adventure sports such as skiing, jet boating, rafting, and bungee jumping. A shift from sheep to dairy farming began in Otago, which was more intensive of water and power resources. The old railway was converted into a bike trail for tourists from 2000.

The National Party supported a controversial aluminium smelter at Aramoana, whose requirement for electric power was one justification for the Clyde Dam. The Alcoholic Liquor Advisory Council (ALAC) was formed in 1976. Beer went on sale in supermarkets in 1999, and the drinking age was lowered from 20 to 18.

Ngāi Tahu's claim from the late 1840s was recognised by the Waitangi Tribunal in 1991 and negotiations between the Crown and Ngāi Tahu followed that same year in response. The Tribunal stated that they "cannot avoid the conclusion that in acquiring from Ngāi Tahu 34.5 million acres, more than half the land mass of New Zealand, for £14,750, and leaving them with only 35,757 acres, the Crown acted unconscionably and in repeated breach of the Treaty of Waitangi".

Court battles continued, but with the intervention of Prime Minister Jim Bolger, a non-binding agreement was signed in 1996. This was followed by the signing of the Deed of Settlement in 1997, and the passage of the Ngāi Tahu Claim Settlement Act in 1998. The main points agreed to by the Crown were to allow Ngāi Tahu to express its traditional relationship with the environment, to issue an apology, grant Ngāi Tahu $170 million and return ownership of pounamu. To enroll as a beneficiary of Ngāi Tahu claim prospective tribe members must prove descent from those members alive in 1848. The list of 1848 living members (the 'Blue Book') was put together in the late 1800s when the fulfillment of the claim seemed imminent.

Planned hydro power plants on the Clutha and Waitaki rivers were stopped. However, a number of wind farms have been built throughout Otago. The Mahinerangi Wind Farm was built in 2011 while Project Hayes in the Lammermoor Range was cancelled in 2012 due to complications in the Environment Court and High Court.

== See also ==
- History of Canterbury
- History of Dunedin
- History of New Zealand
- List of historic hotels in Otago
- List of historic places in Dunedin

== Footnotes ==
- TPNZI, Hutton, op, cit, Vol 24, p. 168
- Note the use of the northern form of spelling is used. The southern dialect sounds more "thick" and guttural. Thus the "ng" of northern or classical Maori becomes "k" in the southern dialect.
- A Compendium of Official Documents Relative To Native Affairs in NZ, Alexander McKay, vol 1, p. 40
- Taiaroa and Tuhawaiki, two famous chiefs of the early 19th century, came of mixed Ngāi Tahu and Ngati Mamoe stock.
- The Maoris of New Zealand, J. Cowan, p. 231-2
- JPS, The Last of the Ngati Mamoe, J. Cowan, Vol 14, p. 196
- Ibid. p. 197
- Beattie, The Southern Maori, p. 46
- Historical Southland, F.G. Hall-Jones, p. 65
- The name for the northern tip of what we now call the Otago Peninsula. Otago reflects an accurate phonetic rendition of Otakou. The name of this area on the Peninsula, the site of the most important Māori settlements in this region, subsequently extended to the whole province.
- Ibid., p. 217
- Ibid., p. 196
- Ibid., p. 197
- Cited by McLintock, Otago, p. 91
- Cited by McNab, Old Whaling Days, p. 68
- Te Puoho and His South Island Raid, A. Ross, 1933.
- Southland Times, 4 December 1937, The Tuturau Maori Raid, H. Beattie
- Angus Ross, Te Puoho and His South Island Raid, 1933.
- Begg, Conversion to Christianity, Historical and Political Studies: 15
- Wohlers, Memories of the Life of J.F.H. Wohlers of Ruapuke, p. 69
- Natusch, Wohlers, p. 86
- Ibid, Claim 240e
- McLintock, Otago, p. 100
- Mit. L. MS. The Wentworth Indenture
- Reminiscences of a Veteran, T. Bunbury, 1861, p. 105
- Reminiscences of a Veteran, T. Bunbury, 1861, p. 106
