= Wohlers =

Wohlers is a surname. Notable people with the surname include:

- Eliza Wohlers (1812 – 1891), English missionary in New Zealand
- Florian Wohlers (born 1976), German canoeist
- Horst Wohlers (born 1949), German football player and manager
- Johan Wohlers (1811–1885), New Zealand missionary
- Jürgen Wohlers (born 1945), German basketball player
- Laurence D. Wohlers (born 1955), Deputy Special Representative for the United Nations Multidimensional Integrated Stabilization Mission in the Central African Republic
- Mark Wohlers (born 1970), American baseball player
- Paul D. Wohlers, American diplomat

== See also ==
- Wöhler
