= Sheila Natusch =

New Zealand writer and naturalist

Sheila Natusch MNZM
- Born: Sheila Ellen Traill; 14 February 1926; Invercargill, New Zealand
- Died: 10 August 2017 (aged 91); Wellington, New Zealand
- Education: University of Otago
- Spouse: Gilbert Gardner Natusch (m. 1950; died 2005)
- Relatives: Roy Traill (father); Eliza Wohlers (great-grandmother); Johan Wohlers (great-grandfather)

Sheila Ellen Natusch MNZM (née Traill, 14 February 1926 – 10 August 2017) was a New Zealand writer and freelance illustrator. Many of her books cover natural history and the history of southern New Zealand, particularly Stewart Island.

== Early life and family ==
Born Sheila Ellen Traill in Invercargill on 14 February 1926, Natusch was the daughter of Robert Henry "Roy" Traill, whose father had emigrated to New Zealand from Orkney, and Michigan-born Dorothea Ellen Traill (née Moseley). Through her father, Natusch was the great-granddaughter of Eliza Wohlers and her husband, German missionary Johan Wohlers. She grew up on Stewart Island, where her father was the wildlife ranger for 33 years, and received her secondary education at Southland Girls' High School. She then studied at Dunedin Teachers' Training College where she met and befriended Janet Frame. The two became lifelong friends; in fact Natusch was the first person to read Frame's manuscript for Owls Do Cry. Later she studied at the University of Otago, graduating Bachelor of Arts in 1948 and Master of Arts with second-class honours in 1949. In 1950, she married Gilbert Gardner Natusch, a hydro-engineer, and the couple lived in Wellington.

== Professional life ==
Natusch wrote, illustrated or compiled over 77 books for adults and children. In the 2007 New Year Honours, Natusch was appointed a Member of the New Zealand Order of Merit for services as a writer and illustrator.

A documentary about Natusch's life, No Ordinary Sheila, by her cousin New Zealand director Hugh Macdonald, featured in the 2017 New Zealand International Film Festival.

Natusch died in Wellington on 10 August 2017.

== Legacy ==
In 2017, Natusch was selected as one of the Royal Society Te Apārangi's "150 women in 150 words", celebrating women's contributions to knowledge in New Zealand.

Lake Sheila on Stewart Island was named after Natusch by her father Roy Traill, a name he suggested after she had accompanied him on numerous expeditions around the Freshwater River area.

== Selected works ==
- Native plants : an introduction to the plant life of New Zealand by Sheila Natusch. Christchurch, N.Z. : Pegasus, 1956
- Native rock by Sheila Natusch. Wellington N.Z. : Reed, 1959/1967
- Stewart Island by N.S. Seaward and Sheila Natusch. Christchurch, N.Z. : Pegasus, 1962
- Animals of New Zealand by Sheila Natusch. Christchurch, Whitcombe & Tombs, 1967
- A bunch of wild orchids by Sheila Natusch. Christchurch, N.Z. : Pegasus, 1968
- Hell and high water : a German occupation of the Chatham Islands, 1843–1910 by Sheila Natusch. Christchurch, N.Z. : Pegasus, c1977
- An island called home by Sheila Natusch. Invercargill, N.Z. : Craig Printing Co., 1992 ISBN 9780908629381 Letters from Jean edited by Sheila Natusch. (by Janet Frame). Wellington N.Z. : Nestegg Books, 2004
- So far so good : an autobiography by Sheila Natusch. Wellington, N.Z. : Nestegg, 2007
