= Eliza Wohlers =

Missionary in New Zealand (1812–1891)

Eliza Wohlers (6 September 1812 – 14 December 1891) was an English emigrant to New Zealand who married a German missionary and joined him in his mission work.

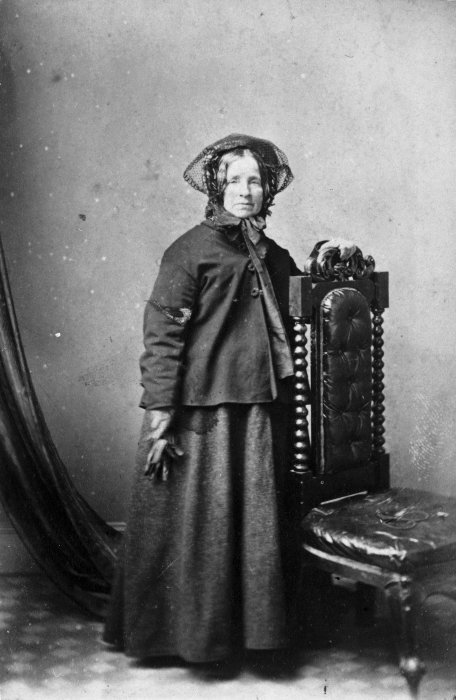
Eliza Wohlers, photographed in Dunedin ca 1877 http://natlib.govt.nz/records/23172144

== Early life ==
Wohlers was born in 1812 in Bridport, England, to Hannah and William Hanham. She became a dressmaker and married Richard Palmer, a carpenter, in 1838. The couple emigrated to New Zealand in 1839. Little is known of their first years in the colony, other than that Palmer died sometime between 1839 and 1849.

== Missionary work ==
In 1849, Wohlers was living in Wellington when a Lutheran missionary from Germany, Johan Wohlers, began asking for recommendations for a suitable woman to marry. Eliza and Johan met in July 1849 and were married two months later. Johan had already spent five years on Ruapuke Island in Foveaux Strait, and he took Eliza there to work with him on his non-denominational mission work for the North German Mission Society. A daughter, Gretchen, was born in 1853.

Wohlers' work in the mission was wide-ranging. She visited the sick and provided basic nursing care, taught sewing, reading and skills such as butter-making at the mission house, and cared for orphans and needy children. She was considered "a tower of strength and character", and encouraged the local Maori population to adopt European ideas of hygiene, clothing and education. During the years of the Wohlers's mission, the settlement grew to have wheatfields, a flour mill, cows and sheep, where previously there had been only the uncertain and dangerous income of whaling. Both Maori and Pakeha from around Ruapuke and other Foveaux Strait settlements attended church services at the mission.

In 1868 a government-funded school opened on the island, and the family ran it from 1870 to 1884. Wohlers taught reading, spelling and the singing of English hymns.

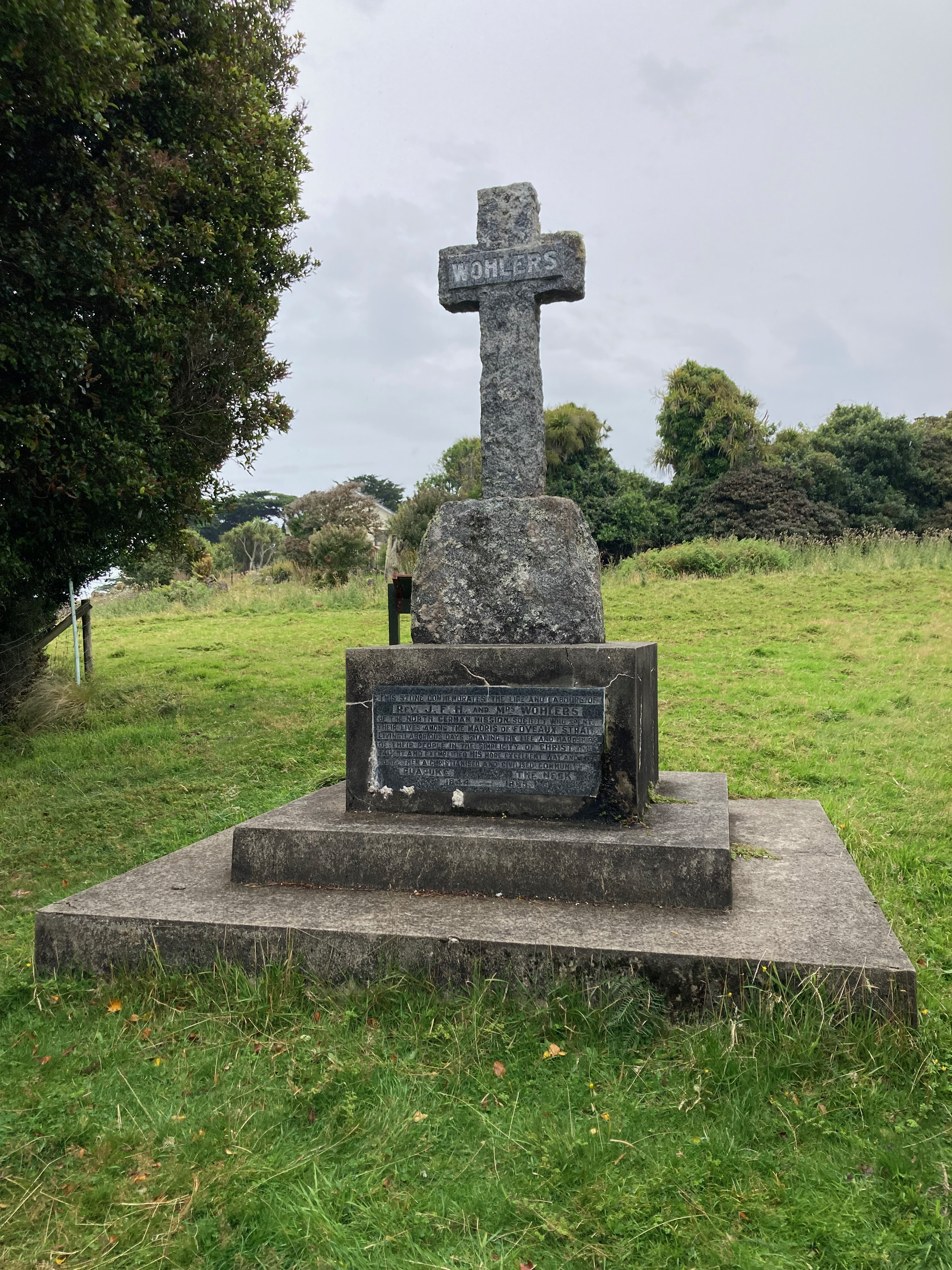
Memorial to Johan and Eliza Wohlers

== Death ==
Wohlers died in Southland on 14 December 1891, six years after her husband. They are buried together at Ringaringa, Stewart Island, across the water from Ruapuke.

== Legacy ==
A memorial to Johan and Eliza Wohlers was built above Ringaringa Beach looking out towards Ruapuke Island.

The writer and naturalist Sheila Natusch was Wohlers's great-granddaughter.
