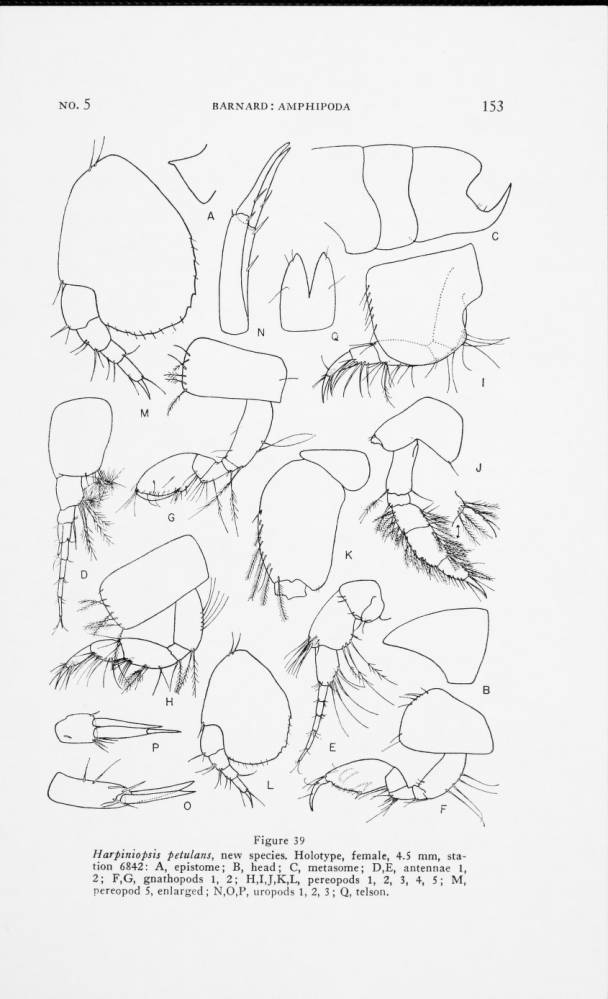

Scientific classification
- Domain: Eukaryota
- Kingdom: Animalia
- Phylum: Arthropoda
- Class: Malacostraca
- Order: Amphipoda
- Family: Phoxocephalidae
- Genus: Harpiniopsis
- Species: H. petulans

Binomial name
- Harpiniopsis petulans J.L. Barnard, 1966

= Harpiniopsis petulans =

Genus of crustaceans

Harpiniopsis petulans is a species of crustacean in the family Phoxocephalidae. It was first described by Jerry Laurens Barnard in 1966, from specimens collected from submarine canyons in Southern California.
