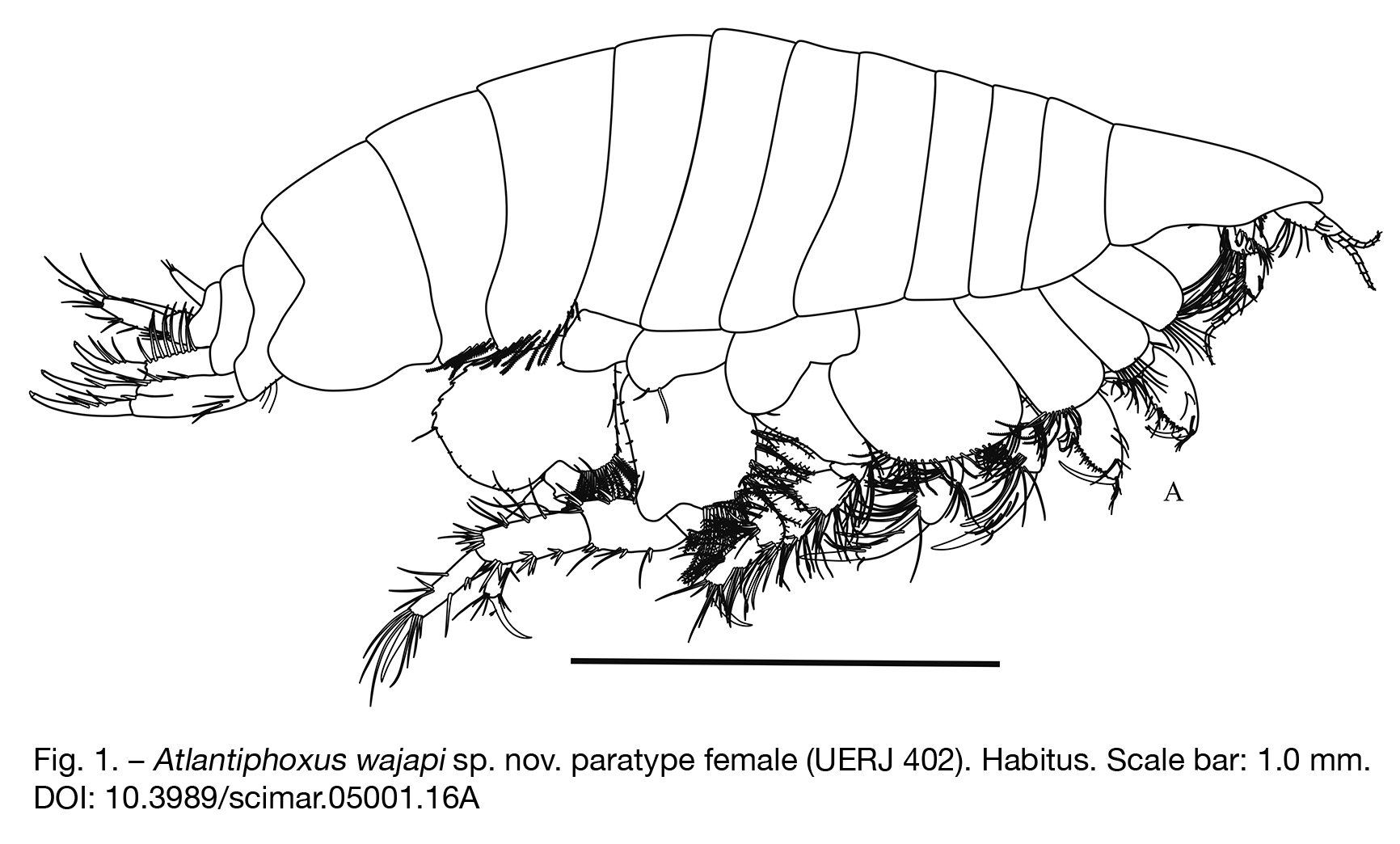
- Atlantiphoxus wajapi

Scientific classification
- Kingdom: Animalia
- Phylum: Arthropoda
- Clade: Pancrustacea
- Class: Malacostraca
- Order: Amphipoda
- Suborder: Amphilochidea
- Infraorder: Lysianassida
- Parvorder: Haustoriidira
- Superfamily: Haustorioidea
- Family: Phoxocephalidae; Sars, 1891

= Phoxocephalidae =

Family of crustaceans

Phoxocephalidae is a family of small, shrimp-like crustaceans in the suborder Gammaridea described by Georg Ossian Sars in 1891. It contains Cocoharpinia iliffei, a critically endangered species on the IUCN Red List.

Genera:

- Atlantiphoxus Andrade & Senna, 2020
- Baliphoxus Ortiz & Lalana, 1999
- Basuto Barnard & Drummond, 1978
- Bathybirubius Senna, 2010
- Beringiaphoxus Jarrett & Bousfield, 1994
- Birubius Barnard & Drummond, 1976
- Booranus Barnard & Drummond, 1978
- Brolgus Barnard & Drummond, 1978
- Cephalophoxoides Gurjanova, 1977
- Cephalophoxus Gurjanova, 1977
- Cephaloxoides
- Cocoharpinia G.Karaman, 1980
- Coxophoxus Barnard, 1966
- Cunmurra Barnard & Drummond, 1978
- Diogodias Barnard & Drummond, 1978
- Elpeddo Barnard & Drummond, 1978
- Eobrolgus J.L.Barnard, 1979
- Eusyrophoxus Gurjanova, 1977
- Eyakia J.L.Barnard, 1979
- Feriharpinia Barnard & Karaman, 1982
- Foxiphalus J.L.Barnard, 1979
- Fuegiphoxus Barnard & Barnard, 1980
- Ganba Barnard & Drummond, 1978
- Grandifoxus J.L.Barnard, 1979
- Griffithsius Jarrett & Bousfield, 1994
- Harpinia Boeck, 1876
- Harpiniopsis Stephensen, 1925
- Heterophoxus Shoemaker, 1925
- Hopiphoxus Barnard & Drummond, 1978
- Indophoxus L.e.Dang, 2005
- Japara Barnard & Drummond, 1978
- Jerildaria Barnard & Drummond, 1978
- Joubinella Chevreux, 1908
- Kondoleus Barnard & Drummond, 1978
- Kotla Barnard & Drummond, 1978
- Kulgaphoxus Barnard & Drummond, 1978
- Kuritus Barnard & Drummond, 1978
- Leongathus Barnard & Drummond, 1978
- Leptophoxoides Barnard, 1962
- Leptophoxus G.O.Sars, 1891
- Limnoporeia Fearn-Wannan, 1968
- Linca AlonsodePina, 1993
- Majoxiphalus Jarrett & Bousfield, 1994
- Mandibulophoxus Barnard, 1957
- Matong Barnard & Drummond, 1978
- Mesophoxus Gurjanova, 1977
- Metaphoxoides Ledoyer, 1967
- Metaphoxus Bonnier, 1896
- Metharpinia Schellenberg, 1931
- Microphoxus J.L.Barnard, 1960
- Palabriaphoxus Gurjanova, 1977
- Parafoxiphalus AlonsodePina, 2001
- Parajoubinella Gurjanova, 1977
- Paramesophoxus Gurjanova, 1977
- Parametaphoxus Gurjanova, 1977
- Parametaphoxus Jarrett & Bousfield, 1994
- Paraphoxus Sars, 1891
- Parharpinia Stebbing, 1899
- Phoxocephalus Stebbing, 1888
- Phoxogorgia
- Phoxorgia Barnard & Barnard, 1980
- Pontharpinia Stebbing, 1897
- Proharpinia Schellenberg, 1931
- Protophoxus K.H.Barnard, 1930
- Pseudfoxiphalus Andres, 1991
- Pseudharpinia Schellenberg, 1931
- Rheopoxinius
- Rhepoxynius J.L.Barnard, 1979
- Rikkarus Barnard & Drummond, 1978
- Ringaringa Barnard & Karaman, 1991
- Synphoxus Gurjanova, 1980
- Tickalerus Barnard & Drummond, 1978
- Tipimegus Barnard & Drummond, 1978
- Torridoharpinia Barnard & Karaman, 1982
- Torridophoxus
- Trichophoxus K.H.Barnard, 1930
- Uldanamia Barnard & Drummond, 1978
- Urophoxus Gurjanova, 1977
- Vasco Barnard & Drummond, 1978
- Vietophoxus L.e.Dang, 2005
- Waipirophoxus Gurjanova, 1980
- Waitangi [sv] Fincham, 1977
- Wildus Barnard & Drummond, 1978
- Yammacoona Barnard & Drummond, 1978
- Yan Barnard & Drummond, 1978
