= Cocoharpinia =

Conservation status
- Critically Endangered (IUCN 2.3)

Scientific classification
- Kingdom: Animalia
- Phylum: Arthropoda
- Class: Malacostraca
- Order: Amphipoda
- Family: Phoxocephalidae
- Subfamily: Harpiniinae
- Genus: Cocoharpinia; Karaman, 1980
- Species: C. iliffei

Binomial name
- Cocoharpinia iliffei Karaman, 1980

Genus of crustaceans

Cocoharpinia is a monotypic genus of crustacean in the family Phoxocephalidae. The only species is Cocoharpinia iliffei. It is endemic to Bermuda.
