= Rhepoxynius =

Scientific classification
- Domain: Eukaryota
- Kingdom: Animalia
- Phylum: Arthropoda
- Class: Malacostraca
- Order: Amphipoda
- Family: Phoxocephalidae
- Subfamily: Phoxocephalinae
- Genus: Rhepoxynius; J.L. Bernard, 1979

Genus of crustaceans

Rhepoxynius is a genus of amphipod. It is found along the east and west coasts of North America.

== Taxonomy ==
The genus Rhepoxynius contains the following species:

- Rhepoxynius abronius
- Rhepoxynius barnardi
- Rhepoxynius bicuspidatus
- Rhepoxynius boreovariatus
- Rhepoxynius daboius
- Rhepoxynius epistomus
- Rhepoxynius fatigans
- Rhepoxynius gemmatus
- Rhepoxynius heterocuspidatus
- Rhepoxynius homocuspidatus
- Rhepoxynius lucubrans
- Rhepoxynius menziesi
- Rhepoxynius pallidus
- Rhepoxynius stenodes
- Rhepoxynius tridentatus
- Rhepoxynius variatus
- Rhepoxynius vigitegus

=== Etymology ===
The name Rhepoxynius comes from rhepo, meaning "slope", and oxyno, meaning "sharpen".
