= Wöhler =

Wöhler may refer to:

== People ==
- August Wöhler (1819–1914), German engineer
- Cordula Wöhler (1845–1916), German writer and hymnwriter
- Friedrich Wöhler (1800–1882), German chemist
- Jürgen (Otto) Wöhler (born 1950 in Oberlahnstein), German lawyer and manager
- Otto Wöhler (1894 in Burgwedel – 1987 in Burgwedel), German general
- Hunter Wohler (born 2003), American football player

== Other ==
- Wöhler (crater), a crater on Earth's moon
- Wöhler curves used in mechanical fatigue analysis
- Wöhler process, a chemical process used in the production of aluminum
- Wöhler synthesis, the chemical reaction in which ammonium cyanate is converted into urea

== See also ==
- Wohlers
