= Te Whakataupuka =

New Zealand Ngai Tahu leader

Te Whakataupuka (late 1700s – by December 1835) was a notable New Zealand Ngāi Tahu leader. He was born in Murihiku, Southland, New Zealand and active from about 1826.
