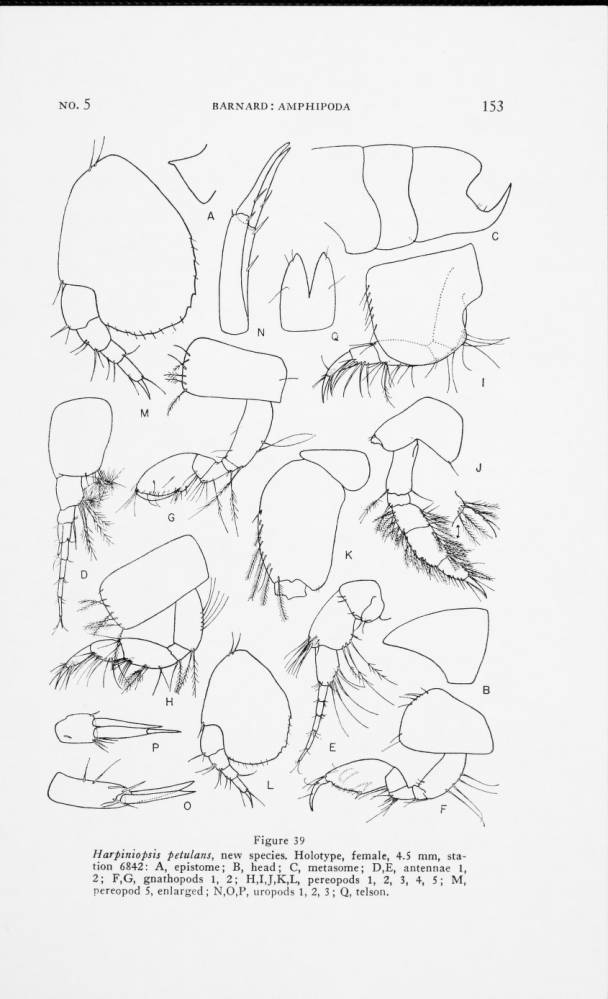
- Harpiniopsis petulans

Scientific classification
- Kingdom: Animalia
- Phylum: Arthropoda
- Clade: Pancrustacea
- Class: Malacostraca
- Order: Amphipoda
- Family: Phoxocephalidae
- Genus: Harpiniopsis; Stephensen, 1925

Type species
- Harpiniopsis similis Stephensen, 1925

= Harpiniopsis =

Genus of crustaceans

Harpiniopsis is a genus of crustaceans in the family Phoxocephalidae. Species of this genus are found throughout the world. It was first described by Knud Stephensen in 1925.

== Species ==
WoRMS lists the following species:

- Harpiniopsis aciculum Ren in Ren & Huang, 1991
- Harpiniopsis amundseni (Gurjanova, 1946)
- Harpiniopsis australis (J.L. Barnard, 1961)
- Harpiniopsis bandelei Ledoyer, 1986
- Harpiniopsis capensis (J.L. Barnard, 1962)
- Harpiniopsis emeryi J.L. Barnard, 1960
- Harpiniopsis epistomata J.L. Barnard, 1960
- Harpiniopsis fulgens J.L. Barnard, 1960
- Harpiniopsis galera J.L. Barnard, 1960
- Harpiniopsis gurjanovae (Bulyčeva, 1936)
- Harpiniopsis hayashisanae Hirayama, 1992
- Harpiniopsis kobjakovae (Bulyčeva, 1936)
- Harpiniopsis miharaensis (Nagata, 1960)
- Harpiniopsis moiseevi (Gurjanova, 1953)
- Harpiniopsis nadania (J.L. Barnard, 1961)
- Harpiniopsis naiadis J.L. Barnard, 1960
- Harpiniopsis orientalis (Bulyčeva, 1936)
- Harpiniopsis pacifica (Bulyčeva, 1936)
- Harpiniopsis pedro Andrade & Jażdżewska, 2026
- Harpiniopsis percellaris J.L. Barnard, 1971
- Harpiniopsis petulans J.L. Barnard, 1966
- Harpiniopsis profundis J.L. Barnard, 1960
- Harpiniopsis pseudonadania Ledoyer, 1986
- Harpiniopsis salebrosa (Gurjanova, 1936)
- Harpiniopsis schurini (Bulyčeva, 1936)
- Harpiniopsis similis Stephensen, 1925
- Harpiniopsis spaercki (Dahl, 1959)
- Harpiniopsis tarasovi (Bulyčeva, 1936)
- Harpiniopsis triplex J.L. Barnard, 1971
- Harpiniopsis vadiculus Hirayama, 1987
- Harpiniopsis wandichia (J.L. Barnard, 1962)
