= Green Island (Foveaux Strait) =

Coordinates: 46.769°S 168.573°E

Green Island is a small uninhabited island in Foveaux Strait, off the southern coast of New Zealand's South Island. It covers an area of approximately 100 hectares, and lies 1500 metres to the east of Parangiaio Point on the larger Ruapuke Island.

Green Island is predominantly a flat table, with its highest point, in the west of the island, being 56 metres above sea level. The area around the island is a hazard to fishing boats, with the island's south coast and the passage between Green Island and Ruapuke abounding in rocky reefs.

== See also ==
- List of islands

== External links ==
Te Papa blog - Green Island (Papatea) – 1941 and 2012
