= Port Pegasus =

Location on Stewart Island in New Zealand

Coordinates: 47°12′S 167°40′E

Port Pegasus, officially Port Pegasus / Pikihatiti, (formerly South Port) is at the southern end of Stewart Island in New Zealand. From the 1890s to the 1950s, Port Pegasus was the site of a small fishing community. There was also a small tin-mining boom in the area in the 1890s. Today, there is no settlement at Port Pegasus, but the location is frequented by tourists, fishermen, hunters, and divers.

== History ==
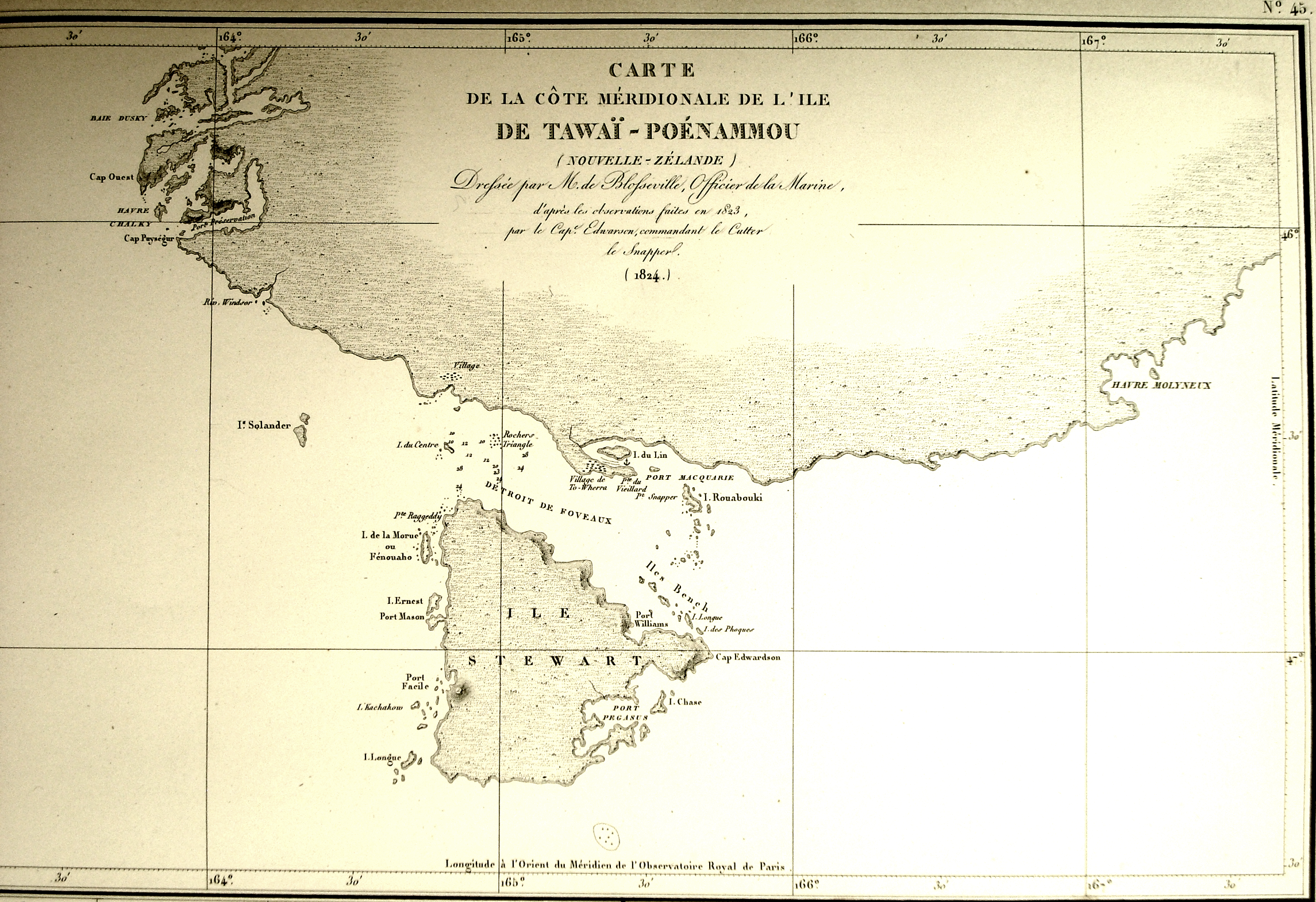
Map by Jules Blosseville of the area

In 1809, when William W. Stewart visited and mapped the island that was later named after him, he named the small bay "South Port". Later, it was renamed "Port Pegasus" to commemorate the Pegasus, Stewart's ship. The brig Pegasus was the former Pegaso, captured at the Peruvian port of Trujillo on 28 July 1807 by the British frigate HMS Cornwallis, commanded by Captain Charles James Johnston, during a cruise against Spanish shipping and ports along the coasts of Spanish America. Johnston dispatched the Pegaso to Port Jackson, where she arrived at the end of October. Submitted to the Court of Admiralty in Sydney, the Pegaso, was condemned as a prize on 24 January 1808 and sold off, renamed Pegasus. A few months later she was acquired by Thomas Moore and in May of that year she was made ready to go on the sealing trade to the southern part of New Zealand. This expedition took place between August 1808 and March 1809, when Pegasus was commanded by Captain Eber Bunker. Pegasus went on a second expedition under the command of Samuel Chase from Port Jackson to London by way of the sealing grounds in southern New Zealand from May 1809 to August 1810: William Stewart was first officer and made charts of the New Zealand coast, including Stewart Island, which was subsequently named after him. It appears to have been Jules de Blosseville who first applied the name Port Pegasus to South Port, on his 1824 Carte de la côte méridionale de l'île de Tawaï-Poénammou (Nouvelle-Zélande); Blosseville was an officer on the expedition of the corvette Coquille commanded by Louis Isidore Duperrey. Duperrey's expedition did not visit the southern part of New Zealand but Jules Alphonse Rene Poret de Blosseville compiled several charts of parts of New Zealand including charts of the southern part of the South Island, from information received when the Coquille called at Sydney. De Blosseville obtained most of his information about southern areas from Captain William Edwardson of the sloop Snapper but he also questioned captains of sealing vessels regarding New Zealand. Several charts of parts of New Zealand compiled by de Blosseville were included in the atlas dated 1827 published to accompany the account of Duperrey's voyage, Voyage autour du monde executé par ordre du Roi sur la corvette La Coquille pendant les années 1822…1825, Paris, 1826). In the title of Carte de la cote meridionale de l'lle de Tawai-Poenammou... de Blosseville acknowledged the chart was drawn from original work by Captain Edwardson.

At the end of the 1970s near the Tin Range the Kākāpō was re-discovered.

Port Pegasus / Pikihatiti is only accessible by boat or by foot via an arduous hiking trail from Oban that was first marked out by Stewart Island ranger Roy Traill.
