= Johan Wohlers =

German missionary in New Zealand (1811–1885)

John (or Johan) Frederick Henry Wohlers (originally Johann Friedrich Heinrich Wohlers, 1 October 1811 – 7 May 1885) was a Lutheran missionary from Germany who lived for 41 years on Ruapuke Island, a small island in New Zealand's deep south.

Wohlers was born in the North German hamlet of Mahlensdorf, near Bremen, to Johann Gerd Wohlers and his wife Margarethe (née Ahlers). He went to a mission school, and was then sent by the North German Missionary Society to New Zealand, where the New Zealand Company was establishing new settlements.

He left Germany on an emigrant ship the St Pauli in 1842, going first to Nelson where there were a number of German settlers. He went south on the ship Deborah in 1844 after he was invited by the Kāi Tahu chief Tūhawaiki to make his headquarters on Ruapuke Island. He built a church in 1846 and had a bell with "Ruapuki" cast on it sent out from Bremen by the North German Missionary Society.

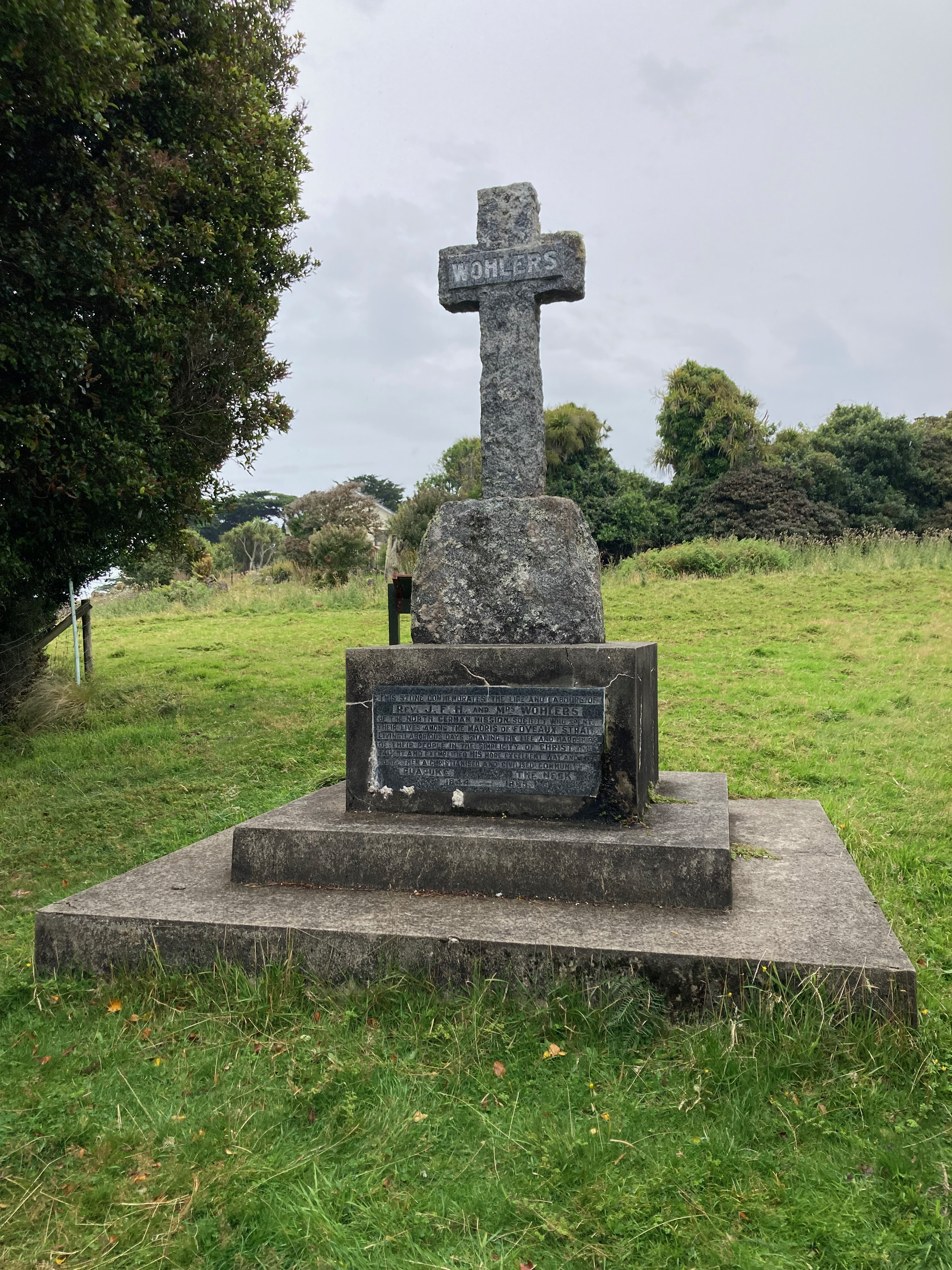
Memorial to Johan and Eliza Wohlers

He married Eliza Hanham in Wellington in 1849, and they had one daughter, Gretchen. Wohlers died on 7 May 1885 at The Neck on Stewart Island; he was survived by his wife for six years. Both are buried at Ringaringa near Oban. A memorial to the Wohlers was built above Ringaringa Beach looking out towards Ruapuke Island.

The "Ruapuki" bell came into the ownership of Māori elder John Topi Patuki. In 1900, it was installed at the bell tower of St Andrew's Anglican Church in Oban.

The writer and naturalist Sheila Natusch was Wohlers's great-granddaughter.

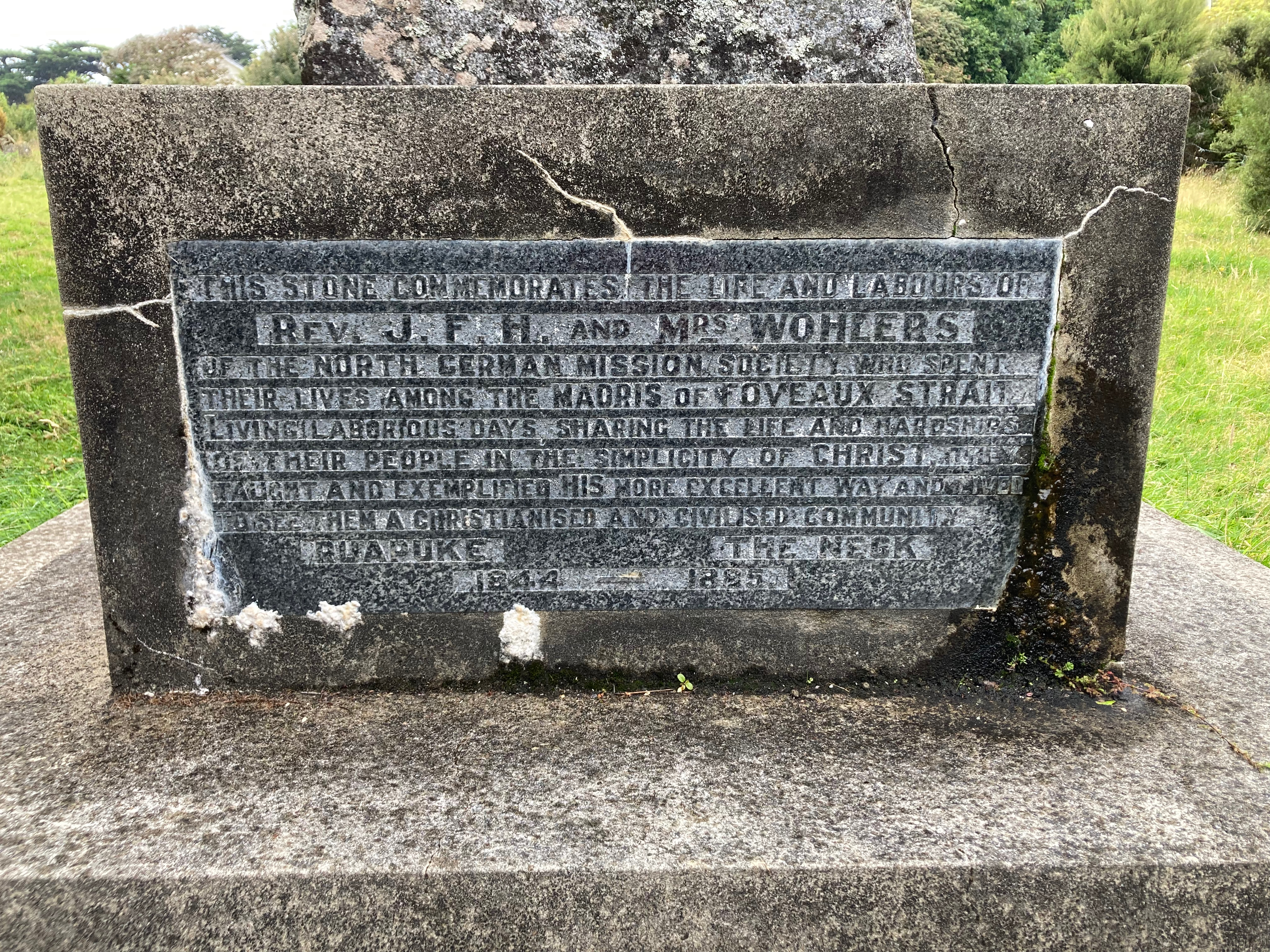
Plaque on Wohlers memorial
