= John Topi Patuki =

New Zealand politician

John (or Teone) Topi Patuki (1866–1945) was a member of the New Zealand Legislative Council from 7 May 1918 to 6 May 1925, when his term ended. He was appointed by the Reform Government.

He was from Ruapuke Island in Foveaux Strait.
