= Roy Traill =

New Zealand conservationist (1892–1989)

Robert Henry Traill
- Born: 1 December 1892; Ringaringa, Stewart Island, New Zealand
- Died: 11 September 1989 (aged 96); Invercargill, New Zealand
- Military career
- Allegiance: New Zealand
- Branch: New Zealand Army
- Nickname: Roy
- Conflicts: World War I
- Awards: Member of the Order of the British Empire

Robert Henry Traill MBE (1 December 1892 – 11 September 1989), generally known as Roy Traill, was a resident and wildlife ranger of Stewart Island in New Zealand. In the course of his work, Traill hiked throughout most of the island and as a result became a source of information on the biota of the island for botanists and zoologists.

Traill was born in Ringaringa, Stewart Island. He attended primary school at Halfmoon Bay School in Oban and high school at Southland Boys' High School in Invercargill, on the South Island. He was a fisherman by trade, and in January 1915 he was enlisted in the New Zealand Army and sent to Egypt to fight in World War I. In 1916, he was wounded in the Battle of the Somme and hospitalised in England. Traill returned to New Zealand in 1917.

In 1925, Traill began working for the State Forest Service and the Department of Lands and Survey on Stewart Island. He travelled by foot across most parts of the island and was primarily responsible for preventing people from hunting the native bird species. In spite of his responsibilities, Traill later admitted to having made stew out of a number of bird species, including the weka and the kaka. Traill was also active in attempting to exterminate any wild mammals that had managed to arrive on the island. Traill marked many tracks on Stewart Island that are still used today, including one from Halfmoon Bay to Port Pegasus. With his knowledge of the island, he was able to assist botanists, zoologists, and conservationists who were studying the biota of Stewart Island later in his career.

Traill retired in 1958 and continued to live in Oban with his son. In the 1963 New Year Honours, he was appointed a Member of the Order of the British Empire, for services to the Stewart Island community. He spent his last years in a hospital in Invercargill and died there at age 96.
