= Ruapuke Island =

Island in Foveaux Strait, New Zealand

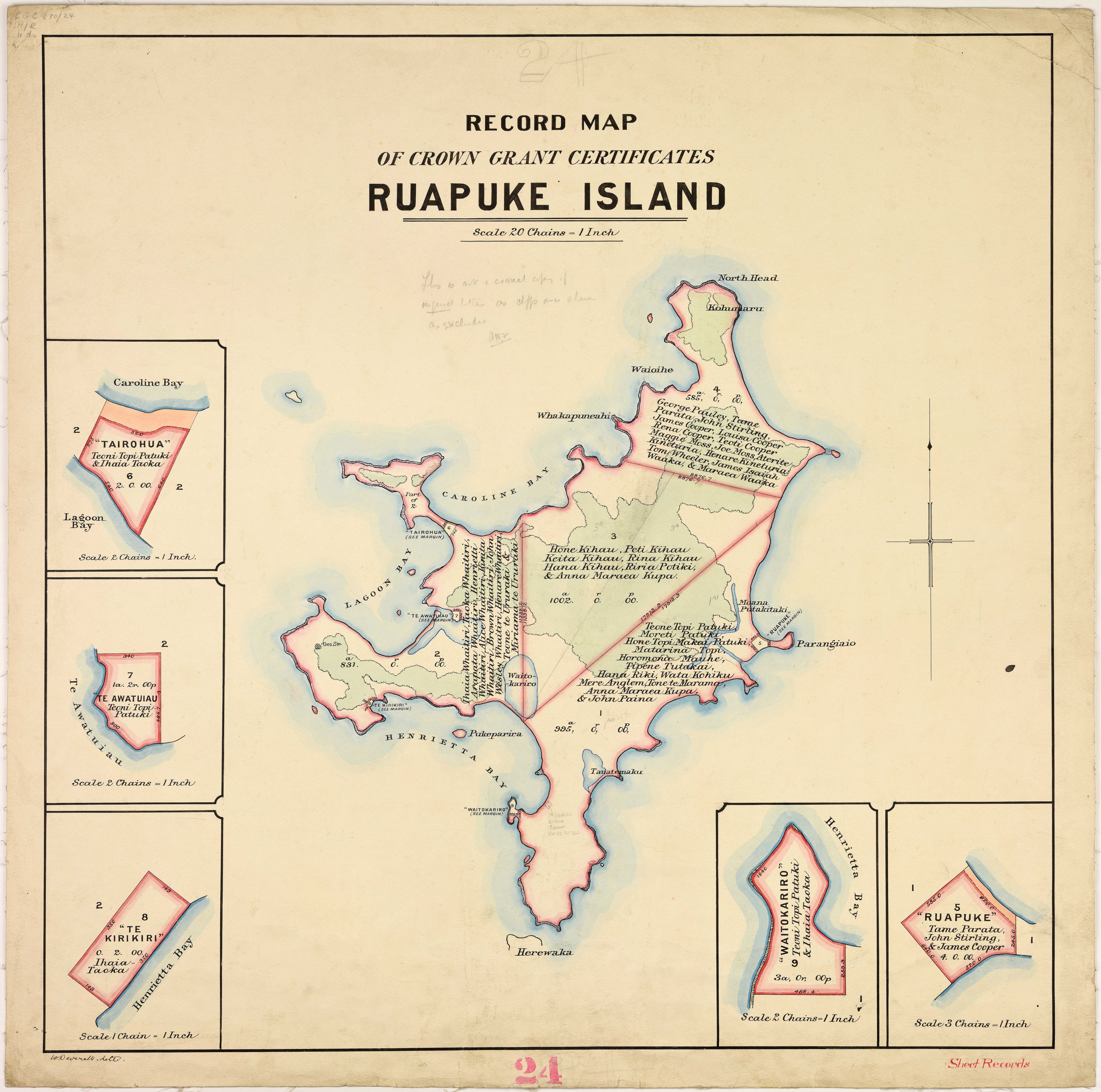
- Overview map of Ruapuke Island

Geography
- Coordinates: 46°47′S 168°30′E
- Area: 16 km^{2} (6.2 sq mi)
- Highest elevation: 64 m (210 ft)

Administration
- New Zealand

Demographics
- Population: 0

Ruapuke Island is one of the southernmost islands in New Zealand's main chain of islands. It is located 15 kilometres (9.3 mi) to the southeast of Bluff and 32 kilometres (20 mi) northeast of Oban on Stewart Island. It was named "Bench Island" upon its discovery by Captain James Cook in 1770, but has rarely been known by any other name than its Māori name, which means "two hills".

Ruapuke Island was called Goulburn Island by Captain John Kent, named after Frederick Goulburn, a Government official in New South Wales, but the whalers generally called it Long Island, or Robuck. The island covers an area of about 16 km^{2} (6 sq mi). It guards the eastern end of Foveaux Strait. Notable Māori inhabitants on the island included Kāi Tahu chief Tūhawaiki and John Topi Patuki.

== Geography ==
The centre of the island is flat with a height of 41 m (135 ft), and there are hummocks on its north, south and west ends. The island is covered mainly with stunted trees, but also has open scrub land and some low-lying marshland. The island's major geographic features include three large bays, the largest of which is Henrietta Bay, in the southwest, named for the brig Elizabeth Henrietta which ran aground there in February 1824. The other bays are Lagoon Bay (in the west) and Caroline Bay (in the north west). The small Waitokariro Lagoon lies immediately inland from Henrietta Bay. The three bays are separated by two large peninsulas, and two more peninsulas extend at the northern and southern ends of the island, culminating in North Head and South Head respectively. One of these peninsulas, that between Lagoon and Caroline Bays, is a tombolo. North Head is a cliffy promontory rising to a hummock, 62 m (203 ft) high. Close to the westernmost point, on the peninsula separating Lagoon Bay and Henrietta Bay, the island reaches its highest point, 64 m (210 ft) above sea level. It is these two hummocks which give the island its name.

The eastern coast is dominated by two long, generally straight beaches to the north, and a series of smaller coves to the south. Between the longer beaches and smaller coves lies an inlet, the mouth of the only river system on the island. A smaller island, Green Island, some 100 hectares (250 acres) in extent, lies 2 kilometres (1.2 miles) off the central east coast, and another small island, Bird Island, which is about a third the size of Green Island, lies 3.5 kilometres (2.2 miles) west of Ruapuke's westernmost point. Other small islets and groups of islets can be found off the coast of Ruapuke. One group of small islets, the South Islets, none of them larger than 10 ha (25 acres) in size, lie immediately to the south of South Head, and beyond these to the southwest is the similarly sized Hazelburgh Islet group. Between Green Island and South Head is a further small group, the Breaksea Islands. Numerous other smaller rocks and reefs surround the island.

=== Geology ===
Exposed basement igneous intrusion rocks are found on this rather flat island that are Longwood Suite granitoids in the Median Batholith that bisects Zealandia dividing its Western and Eastern Provinces. These plutonic rocks are part of a former subduction zone on the edge of Gondwana, before Zealandia's separation from it; about 260 to 245 million years ago in the case of the dated rocks from the island.

== Biodiversity ==
A species of mygalomorph spider, Stanwellia tuna, is known to be endemic to Ruapuke Island.

== History ==
The island formerly had a Māori population of 200. Notable Māori inhabitants included Kāi Tahu chief Tūhawaiki and John Topi Patuki, MLC. A mission station was established on the island in 1843 by the Rev Johan Wohlers, but it too is long gone.

The island was the site of several shipwrecks during the latter half of the 19th century, though most were without the loss of life. One exception was the collision of the cutters "Annie" and "Deveron" during a storm in April 1894, which resulted in the loss of two lives. The island and its surrounding rocks and reefs are still a hazard to the fishing vessels which ply Foveaux Strait, itself a notoriously dangerous stretch of water.

Sheep were farmed on the island for some time, though it is now uninhabited, and privately owned by descendants of Tūhawaiki. The island is notable for its bird life, and it is a breeding site for the endangered yellow-eyed penguin. Cetaceans such as southern right whales may be spotted around the island during migration seasons.

== Notable persons ==
- Tame Parata (1839–1917), born here
- Kiti Karaka Rīwai (1870–1927), was born there
- Johan Wohlers (1811–1885), lived on Ruapuke from 1844

== See also ==
- List of islands of New Zealand
- Desert island
