= Murihiku =

Territory in New Zealand

Coordinates: 45.7°S 168.1°E

Murihiku is a region of the South Island in New Zealand, as used by the Māori people. Traditionally it was used to describe the portion of the South Island below the Waitaki River, but now is mostly used to describe the province of Southland. The name means 'the tail end (of the land)' (literally muri, 'the end of'; hiku, 'tail').

In 1861, when Southland became a province, the settler population wanted it to be named Murihiku, but this wish was ignored by Governor Thomas Gore Browne. This was "much to the inhabitants' indignation and disgust".
