= Ringu Ringu =

Indigenous Australian people of Queensland

The Ringaringa (Ringu-Ringu) were an indigenous Australian people of the state of Queensland.

== Alternative names ==
- Ringoringo
- Ringu-ringu
- Ringa-ringaroo
- Yuntauntaya
- Njuntauntaya

== Sources ==
- "AIATSIS map of Indigenous Australia". AIATSIS. 28 July 2023.
- Collins, R. M. (1886). "The Hamilton River" (PDF). In Curr, Edward Micklethwaite (ed.). The Australian race: its origin, languages, customs, place of landing in Australia and the routes by which it spread itself over the continent. Vol. 2. Melbourne: J. Ferres. pp. 354–355.
- McLean (1886). Curr, Edward Micklethwaite (ed.). The Australian race: its origin, languages, customs, place of landing in Australia and the routes by which it spread itself over the continent (PDF). Vol. 2. Melbourne: J. Ferres.
- Roth, W. E. (1897). Ethnological Studies among the North-West-Central Queensland Aborigines (PDF). Brisbane: Edmund Gregory, Government Printer.
- Tindale, Norman Barnett (1974). "Ringaringa (QLD)". Aboriginal Tribes of Australia: Their Terrain, Environmental Controls, Distribution, Limits, and Proper Names. Australian National University Press. ISBN 978-0-708-10741-6.
