= List of New Zealand inventors =

The following is a list of New Zealand inventors and inventions.

- Godfrey Bowen – developer of an improved sheep-shearing technique
- John Britten – designer of the Britten motorcycle
- Thomas Brydone and William Soltau Davidson – refrigerated shipping pioneers
- Morton Coutts – invented the continuous fermentation method of brewing
- Bill Gallagher – developer of the electric fence and founder of Gallagher Group Limited
- Ernest Godward – improved eggbeater
- A. J. Hackett – popularised of commercial Bungy jumping
- Bill Hamilton – developed the modern jetboat
- Frederick Hanson – inventor of chipseal, known in New Zealand as tar seal
- Peter Lynn – leading kitemaker, aeronautical theoretician and inventor of the tipping blade portable sawmill
- Colin Murdoch – inventor of the disposable syringe and the tranquilliser gun
- Richard Pearse – aviation pioneer
- Bill Pickering – rocketry and space pioneer, former NASA Jet Propulsion Lab director
- Alan Prichard – pioneer of aerial topdressing
- Bill Robinson – inventor of the lead rubber bearing used for seismic base isolation in earthquake engineering
