= New Zealand's Top 100 History Makers =

New Zealand weekly television programme

- Narrated by: Alison Mau
- Country of origin: New Zealand
- No. of seasons: 1
- No. of episodes: 7

Original release
- Network: Prime
- Release: 6 October – 17 November 2005

New Zealand's Top 100 History Makers is a weekly television programme first shown on Prime Television New Zealand on 6 October 2005. 430 notable New Zealanders were ranked by a panel to determine the 100 most influential in New Zealand history. There were six episodes to present the list, and a final (seventh) episode, screened live on 17 November 2005, showed the rankings of the top ten of these people as a result of votes collected from the public via text and internet.

Diana Wichtel, reviewing the show in the New Zealand Listener, described it as "surprisingly watchable", but commented that the format was "history as striptease, with the programme counting down over the weeks to the big winner." Scott Kara, writing in The New Zealand Herald, called it "educational but not dull". Another review described it as "history ... as an Idol-style talent search".

Joseph Romanos, one of the panellists, produced a book later in 2005 containing profiles of the same 100 people. The book was revised for a 2008 edition.

== Panel ==
The show's rankings were produced by merging the ratings of eight panellists, who are all well-known New Zealanders:

- Stacey Daniels – Television and radio personality
- Raybon Kan – Comedian
- Robyn Langwell – Editor of North & South magazine
- Douglas Lloyd-Jenkins – Writer and historian
- Melanie Nolan – Historian
- Joseph Romanos – radio host, sports writer
- Tainui Stephens – Television producer
- Kerre Woodham – Radio personality

== Panel rankings ==
1. Ernest Rutherford (1871–1937) – physicist
2. Kate Sheppard (1848–1934) – suffragist
3. Sir Edmund Hillary (1919–2008) – mountaineer and explorer
4. Sir George Grey (1812–1898) – Governor and Premier
5. Michael Joseph Savage (1872–1940) – politician
6. Sir Āpirana Ngata (1874–1950) – Māori politician
7. Hōne Heke (c.1807/1808 – 1850) – Māori chief
8. Dr Frederick Truby King (1858–1938) – founder of Plunket Society
9. William Hobson (1792–1842) – co-author of the Treaty of Waitangi
10. Jean Batten (1909–1982) – aviator
11. Sir Brian Barratt-Boyes (1924–2006) – heart surgeon
12. Sir Peter Snell (1938–2019) – runner
13. Bill Pickering (1910–2004) – space scientist
14. Sir Peter Jackson (born 1961) – film maker
15. Janet Frame (1924–2004) – writer
16. Te Rauparaha (1760s–1849) – Māori leader
17. Sir Colin Meads (1936–2017) – All Black
18. Dame Whina Cooper (1895–1994) – Māori leader
19. Katherine Mansfield (1888–1923) – writer
20. Thomas Brydone (1837–1904) and William Soltau Davidson (1846–1924) – refrigeration pioneers
21. Richard Pearse (1877–1953) – aviation pioneer
22. Te Whiti o Rongomai (c.1830–1907) – pacifist Māori leader
23. Richard Seddon (1845–1906) – Premier and Prime Minister of New Zealand
24. Sir Te Rangi Hīroa (Peter Buck) (1877–1951) – Māori leader
25. Sir Julius Vogel (1835–1899) – politician
26. Maurice Wilkins (1916–2004) – scientist Nobel laureate
27. Helen Clark (born 1950) – politician
28. Mabel Howard (1894–1972) – politician
29. Sir Bernard Freyberg (1889–1963) – lieutenant-general
30. Sir Harold Gillies (1882–1960) – plastic surgeon
31. Dame Kiri Te Kanawa (born 1944) – opera singer
32. Sir Keith Park (1892–1975) – air chief marshal
33. Professor Alan MacDiarmid (1927–2007) – Nobel laureate chemist
34. Sir Peter Blake (1948–2001) – yachtsman
35. Dr C.E. (Clarence Edward) Beeby (1902–1998) – educationalist
36. Jack Lovelock (1910–1949) – athlete
37. Dr John Bedbrook – biotechnologist
38. James K. Baxter (1926–1972) – poet
39. Dr Fred Hollows (1929–1993) – eye surgeon
40. Sir Murray Halberg (1933–2022) – athlete and philanthropist
41. Neil Finn (born 1958) – musician
42. Edward Gibbon Wakefield (1796–1862) – colony founder
43. David Lange (1942–2005) – politician
44. Sir Robert Muldoon (1921–1992) – politician
45. Thomas Edmonds – industrialist
46. Colin McCahon (1919–1987) – painter
47. Colin Murdoch (1929–2008) – inventor
48. Sir Archibald McIndoe (1900–1960) – plastic surgeon
49. Rev Samuel Marsden (1765–1838) – missionary
50. Peter Fraser (1884–1950) – politician
51. John Clarke (1948–2017) – comedian
52. Ettie Rout (1877–1936) – campaigner for safe sex
53. Arthur Lydiard (1917–2004) – popularised jogging
54. Kupe – discoverer of Aotearoa
55. Te Puea Hērangi (1883–1952) – Māori leader
56. Sir John Walker (born 1952) – runner
57. Tim Finn (born 1952) – musician
58. John A. Lee (1891–1982) – politician
59. Sir James Wattie (1902–1974) – industrialist
60. Sir Bill Hamilton (1899–1978) – inventor
61. Norman Kirk (1923–1974) – politician
62. Bill Gallagher (1911–1990) – inventor
63. Dr Michael King (1945–2004) – historian
64. Frances Hodgkins (1869–1947) – painter
65. George Nēpia (1905–1986) – All Black
66. Sir James Fletcher (1886–1974) – industrialist
67. Mother Aubert (1835–1926) – nun
68. Charles Heaphy (1820–1881) – explorer
69. A.H. Reed (1875–1975) – publisher
70. Frank Sargeson (1903–1982) – writer
71. Sir Roger Douglas (born 1937) – politician
72. Dr Matthew During (1956–2023) – neuroscientist
73. Te Kooti Arikirangi Te Turuki (c.1832–1893) – warrior
74. Hongi Hika (1772–1828) – warrior chief
75. Sir David Low (1891–1963) – cartoonist
76. Kate Edger (1857–1935) – women's pioneer
77. Dame Marie Clay (1926–2007) – educationalist
78. Rewi Alley (1897–1987) – sinophile
79. Thomas Rangiwahia Ellison (1867–1904) – rugby union captain
80. Rua Kēnana Hepetipa (1869–1937) – prophet
81. Tahupotiki Wiremu Ratana (1873?–1939) – prophet
82. Aunt Daisy (1879–1963) – broadcaster
83. Charles Upham (1908–1994) – soldier
84. Ralph Hotere (1931–2013) – artist
85. Sir Richard Hadlee (born 1951) – cricketer
86. Billy T. James (1948–1991) – comedian
87. Sir Keith Sinclair (1922–1993) – historian
88. Charles Goldie (1870–1947) – painter
89. John Minto (born 1953) – activist
90. Rudall Hayward (1900–1974) – film maker
91. Witi Ihimaera (born 1944) – writer
92. John Te Rangianiwaniwa Rangihau (1919–1987) – Māori language promoter
93. Dave Dobbyn (born 1957) – songwriter
94. Russell Coutts (born 1962) – sailor
95. Jonah Lomu (1975–2015) – All Black
96. Peter Mahon (1923–1986) – lawyer
97. Georgina Beyer (1957–2023) – transgender politician
98. A. J. Hackett (born 1958) – bungy jumping pioneer
99. Denny Hulme (1936–1992) – Formula One driver
100. Russell Crowe (born 1964) – actor

On the final programme, the 101st on the list was revealed:

101. Sir Mountford "Toss" Woollaston (1910–1998) – painter

== Public rankings ==
1. Ernest Rutherford (1871–1937) – scientist
2. Kate Sheppard (1848–1934) – suffragist
3. Sir Edmund Hillary (1919–2008) – explorer and humanitarian
4. Charles Upham (1908–1994) – war hero
5. Billy T. James (1948–1991) – comedian
6. David Lange (1942–2005) – prime minister
7. Sir Āpirana Ngata (1874–1950) – politician
8. Colin Murdoch (1929–2008) – inventor of the disposable syringe
9. Rua Kēnana Hepetipa (1869–1937) – prophet
10. Roger Douglas (born 1937) – politician and economist

== Other editions ==
Other countries have produced similar shows; see Greatest Britons spin-offs
