= National Lamb Day =

Annual observance in New Zealand

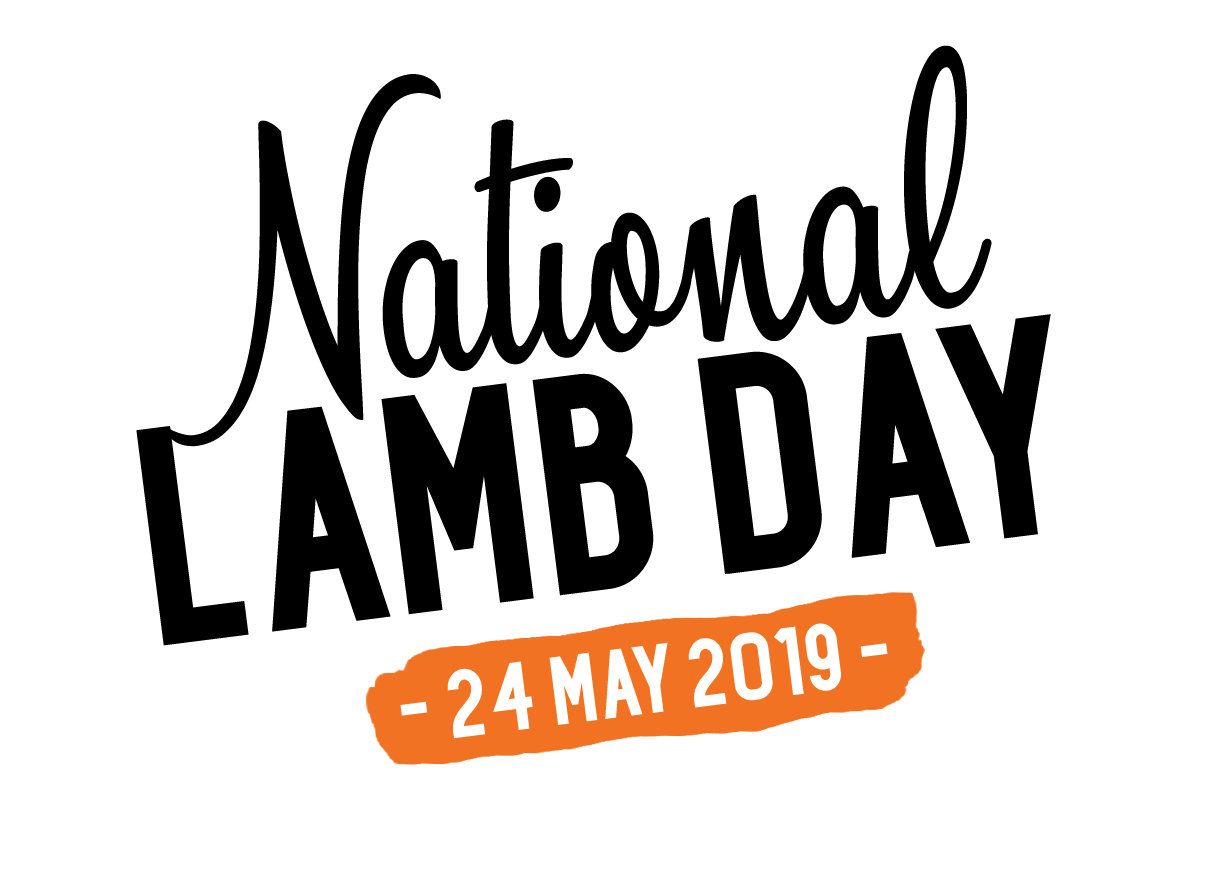
2019 National Lamb Day logo

National Lamb Day is an annual observance that occurs in New Zealand on 24 May.

== Overview ==
The first National Lamb Day was celebrated on 15 February, to commemorate the day in 1882 that William Davidson and Thomas Brydone launched the first shipment of frozen sheep meat from Port Chalmers, Otago, New Zealand on the Dunedin bound for London. In 2018, National Lamb Day was changed to 24 May to reflect the arrival of the shipment in London. In 2018, Beef + Lamb New Zealand celebrated National Lamb Day by commissioning a giant lamb chop which visited various landmarks around New Zealand.

== History of New Zealand lamb exports ==
The Dunedin’s voyage was organized by William Soltau Davidson, the British-based general manager of the New Zealand and Australian Land Company, whose landholdings in the two countries exceeded 1 million hectares. Davidson had taken an interest in refrigerated experiments, which had proved the concept, if not yet the economic viability, of shipping frozen meat around the globe.

About 5,000 carcasses were on board the Dunedin when it sailed from New Zealand on 15 February. On arrival in London on 24 May, only one carcass had to be condemned, and the cargo's superiority over Australian shipments was remarked upon. More than a single successful shipment was needed to create a new industry. The new technology ultimately enabled the owner-operated (family) farm to become the standard economic unit in rural New Zealand for the next century.

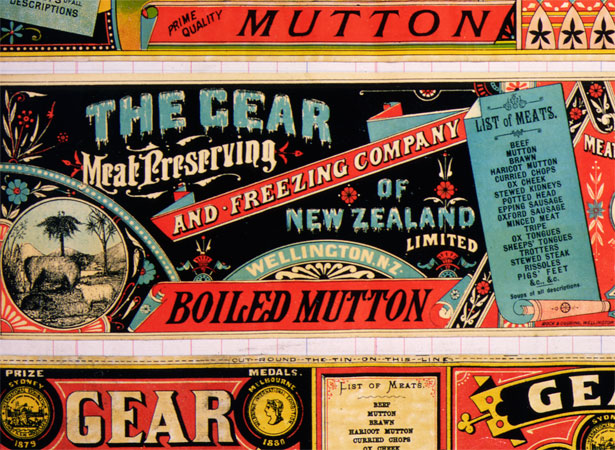
Gear Meat Preserving Freezing Company labels.
