= Barbara Brookes =

New Zealand historian and academic (born 1955)

Barbara Brookes MNZM FRSNZ
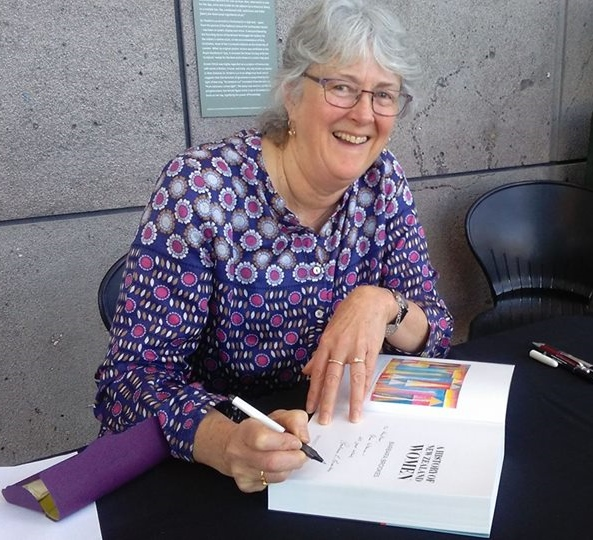
- Brookes at a book-signing in Christchurch in 2016
- Education: University of Otago; Bryn Mawr College
- Scientific career
- Fields: History
- Thesis: Abortion in England, 1919–1939 (1982)

Barbara Lesley Brookes MNZM FRSNZ (born 1955) is a New Zealand historian and academic. She specialises in women's history and medical history, publishing both internationally and in New Zealand. She worked at the University of Otago for more than 35 years, and when she retired in mid-2020 was made Professor Emerita.

== Biography ==
Brookes completed a bachelor's degree at the University of Otago in 1976, then won scholarships to Bryn Mawr College in Pennsylvania, where she completed a master's degree (1978) and a PhD (1982). Her PhD thesis topic was abortion in England during the inter-war period. Brookes was offered a post-doctoral scholarship at Otago and a permanent position in the university's Department of History in 1983.

In 1986, Brookes and her colleague Dorothy Page introduced the first university-level women's history paper in New Zealand. In 2004, Brookes became head of the Department of History and guided the amalgamation of the department with the art history department to form the Department of History and Art History. She held the position until 2012.

Brookes has had a continuing interest the history of mental illness and, together with Jane Thomson, published a collection of research students’ essays “Unfortunate Folk: Essays on Mental Health Treatment (University of Otago Press, 2001) and most recently, Barbara Brookes and James Dunk, eds. Knowledge Making: Historians, Archives and Bureaucracy (Routledge, 2020). Her international collaborations include the volume edited with Tracy Penny Light and Wendy Mitchinson, Bodily Subjects: Essays on Gender and Health, 1800-2000 (McGill-Queen’s University Press, 2014).

In 2021 Brookes was elected a Fellow of the Royal Society Te Apārangi. The society said that Brookes' research "has contributed to a vast international expansion of the historical canon from the 1970s, particularly in relation to the history of gender. It continues to be innovative and widely published".

== A History of New Zealand Women ==
Brookes' sole-authored publication, A History of New Zealand Women (Bridget Williams Books, 2016), won the 2017 Ockham New Zealand Book Award in the Illustrated Non-Fiction category. The book represents over thirty years of research on the topic of New Zealand women's history (inaugurated by a 1986 volume Brookes co-edited with Margaret Tennant and Charlotte Macdonald, Women in History).

Marion Castree describes A History of New Zealand Women as "a superb New Zealand history through the perspective of women's lives and all they contributed to our comparatively short but intense experience in Aotearoa. . . . Beautifully illustrated and designed, this book will never date." Susanna Andrew, writing for noted.co.nz, says the book is "a brilliant examination of how we got to where we are now. […] Brookes has marked every change and shift with clarity and scholarly precision." Charlotte Paul, writing for the New Zealand Medical Journal, says that Brookes "weaves different perspectives of Māori and Pakeha lives into a tapestry that enriches our sense of what it is to be a New Zealander."

== Publications ==
Brookes' publications include:

- Women in History: Essays on European Women in New Zealand, co-edited with Margaret Tennant and Charlotte Macdonald (Allen & Unwin, 1986)
- Abortion in England 1900–1967 (Croom Helm, 1988, reissued by Routledge Library Editions: Women’s History, 2013.)
- Women in History 2: Essays on Women in New Zealand, co-edited with Margaret Tennant and Charlotte Macdonald (Allen & Unwin, 1992)
- At Home in New Zealand: Houses, History, People (Bridget Williams Books, 2000)
- 'Unfortunate Folk': Essays on Mental Health Treatment 1863–1992, co-edited with Jane Thomson (Otago University Press, 2002)
- Communities of Women: Historical Perspectives, co-edited with Dorothy Page (Otago University Press, 2002)
- Sites of Gender: Women, Men & Modernity in Southern Dunedin, 1890–1939, co-edited with Robin Law and Annabel Cooper (Auckland University Press, 2003)
- A History of New Zealand Women (Bridget Williams Books, 2016)
- Warwick Anderson, Miranda Johnson and Barbara Brookes, Pacific Futures: Past and Present (University of Hawai’i Press, 2018).
- Barbara Brookes, Jane McCabe and Angela Wanhalla, eds. Past Caring? Women, Work and Emotion (Otago University Press, 2019).
- Barbara Brookes and James Dunk, eds. Knowledge Making: Historians, Archives and Bureaucracy (Routledge, 2020).

== Honours and awards ==
In 2017, Brookes' book A History of New Zealand Women won the 2017 Ockham New Zealand Book Award in the Illustrated Non-Fiction category.

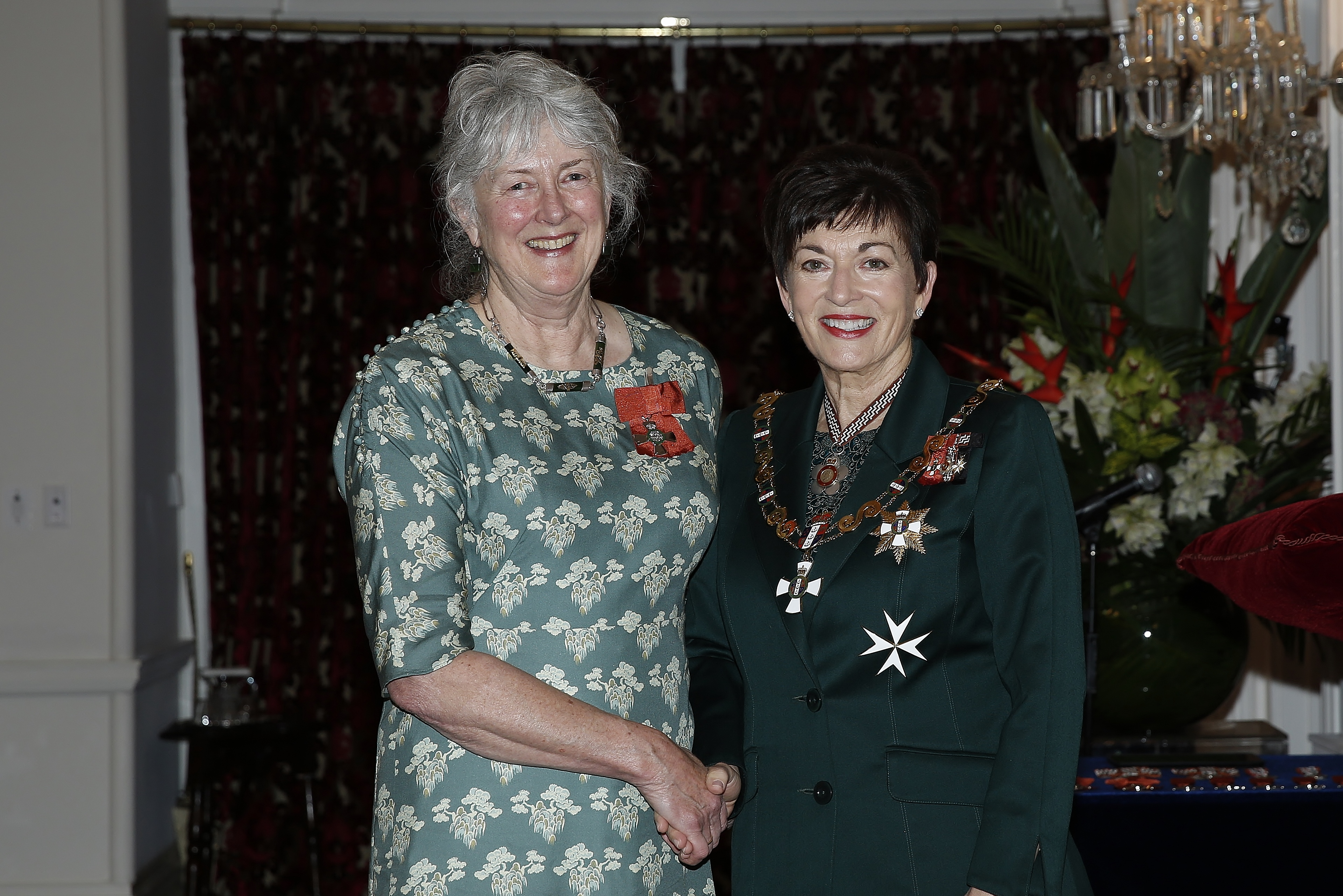
Brookes (left) in 2018, after her investiture as a Member of the New Zealand Order of Merit by the governor-general, Dame Patsy Reddy

In the 2018 New Year Honours, Brookes was appointed a Member of the New Zealand Order of Merit for services to historical research and women.

In 2018 Brookes received the Humanities Aronui Medal from the Royal Society for her 'outstanding contribution to Humanities scholarship, reshaping the history of New Zealand by putting women at the centre of a substantial and internationally recognised body of scholarly work culminating in A History of New Zealand Women'. She was elected a Fellow of the Royal Society Te Apārangi in 2021.
