= Jack Sinclair (physiologist) =

New Zealand physiologist and middle-distance athlete

Personal information
- Born: John Desmond Sinclair; 14 March 1927 Auckland, New Zealand
- Died: 11 February 2018 (aged 90) Auckland, New Zealand
- Spouse: Pat Dunn (m. 1952)
- Children: 4
- Scientific career
- Education: Mount Albert Grammar School
- Alma mater: University of Otago
- Relatives: Keith Sinclair (brother); Harry Sinclair (nephew); Stephen Sinclair (nephew); Raewyn Dalziel (sister-in-law)
- Fields: Neurophysiology
- Institutions: University of Auckland
- Thesis: The effect of breathing exercises in chronic pulmonary emphysema (1955)

Sport
- Country: New Zealand
- Sport: Track and field

Achievements and titles
- National finals: 1 mile champion (1948, 1950)
- Personal best: 1 mile – 4:13.5

John Desmond Sinclair (14 March 1927 – 11 February 2018) was a New Zealand neurophysiologist and middle-distance athlete who represented his country at the 1950 British Empire Games. He was involved in the establishment of the medical school at the University of Auckland in 1968, and was the school's foundation professor of physiology.

== Early life and family ==
Born in Auckland on 14 March 1927, Sinclair was the fourth of 10 children of Ernest Duncan Sinclair and Florence Pyrenes Sinclair (née Kennedy). His siblings included the historian Keith Sinclair and the journalist and talkback radio host Geoff Sinclair. Jack Sinclair was educated at Mount Albert Grammar School, and went on to study at the University of Otago, from where he graduated Bachelor of Medical Sciences in 1948 and MB ChB.

In 1952, Sinclair married Patricia Colleen Dunn, and the couple went on to have four children.

== Athletics ==
Sinclair was prominent as a middle-distance athlete during his time as a student at the University of Otago. At the 1946 New Zealand University Easter tournament in Christchurch, he won the one mile, finished second in the 880 yards and third in the three miles. In 1947, he won the Otago 880 yards championship in a time of 2:02.2, defeating Arch Jelley, and was the New Zealand University champion for both the 880 yards and one mile. The following year, representing Otago, Sinclair won the first of his two New Zealand national one-mile titles, defeating Maurice Marshall in a time of 4:23.4 at the national championships in Dunedin, and also finished second in the 880 yards. A few weeks later, he broke Jack Lovelock's university record of 4:28.0 for the mile, running 4:23.6 at the Otago University sports. Also in 1948, Sinclair retained his New Zealand University 880 yards and one-mile titles.

In 1949, the first ever official athletic test between New Zealand and Australia was held at Athletic Park, Wellington, on 5 March, with Sinclair representing New Zealand in the one mile. He finished second, behind Australian national champion John Marks. A week later, Sinclair placed third in the mile at the national amateur athletic championships in Christchurch, behind Neil Bates and Maurice Marshall. At the 1949 New Zealand University Easter tournament, Sinclair retained his one-mile title, lowering the New Zealand university record for the distance to 4:20.1, and he was subsequently named in the New Zealand Universities squad to travel to Sydney to compete against Australian university teams. Competing against Combined Australian Universities, Sinclair placed second behind Australian Don MacMillan in the one mile, but he won the same event at a meeting with Sydney University Athletic Club a few days later. At the Auckland athletic championships held in December 1949, Sinclair dead-heated for first with Neil Wilson in the men's 880 yards, both recording a time of 1:53.6.

On 2 January 1950, at the national athletic championships held in Napier, Sinclair won what was at the time described as "the greatest mile ever run in New Zealand". His time of 4:13.5 in beating Maurice Marshall and Neil Bates in a closely contested race was a New Zealand resident record, narrowly eclipsing the 4:13.6 set by Randolph Rose in 1926 at Masterton. Sinclair then competed in the men's one mile at the 1950 British Empire Games in Auckland. He finished third in his heat, recording a time of 4:19.8 in a close race, to progress to the final. In the final, he placed sixth in 4:20.0, with the winner, Canadian Bill Parnell, recording an Empire Games record of 4:11.0 and Maurice Marshall, the best-placed New Zealander, finishing third with a time of 4:13.2.

== Medical and academic career ==
Sinclair's early research, as part of his Bachelor of Medical Science studies, was conducted in the laboratory of John Eccles—at that time a professor at the University of Otago and later a Nobel laureate—and was published in the Journal of Neurophysiology in 1949. In 1953, Sinclair began working at Green Lane Hospital in Auckland as a Medical Research Council fellow in chest diseases. He then undertook overseas postgraduate training in respiratory medicine, first at the Royal Brompton and Hammersmith Hospitals in London, and then at the Mayo Clinic in the United States, returning to New Zealand in 1960. Sinclair was awarded a Doctor of Medicine degree by the University of Otago on the basis of his research in respiratory medicine, with a thesis titled The effect of breathing exercises in chronic pulmonary emphysema.

Sinclair was appointed the head of the Department of Clinical Physiology at Green Lane Hospital in 1960, contributing to ground-breaking work there in cardiothoracic surgery and medicine. In 1964, he became a member of the University of Auckland's medical advisory committee, planning the establishment of the Auckland Medical School, which opened in 1968. In that year, he was appointed the inaugural professor of physiology at the Auckland Medical School. He remained head of the Department of Physiology until 1984, and later served in the same role from 1990 to 1993. He was also acting head of the Department of Biochemistry between 1972 and 1974.

Sinclair served as scientific secretary of the Medical Research Council in 1966, and was a Fellow of the Royal Australasian College of Physicians.

== Later life and death ==
Sinclair retired in 1993 and was conferred the title of professor emeritus, although he continued some teaching duties until 1997. He died at his home in Auckland on 11 February 2018.
