= Charlotte Macdonald =

New Zealand historian

Charlotte Macdonald FRSNZ
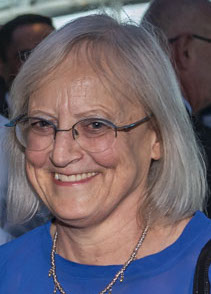
- Born: 1950 (age 75–76)
- Awards: Fellow of the Royal Society of New Zealand (2017)

Academic background
- Education: Massey University (BA [Hons]); University of Auckland (PhD)
- Thesis: Single Women as Immigrant Settlers in New Zealand, 1853–1871 (1986)
- Doctoral advisor: Raewyn Dalziel

Academic work
- Institutions: Victoria University of Wellington
- Main interests: 19th century colonies and empires New Zealand history Gender and women's history

Charlotte Jean Macdonald FRSNZ is a New Zealand historian. After studying as an undergraduate at Massey University, she earned her PhD from University of Auckland. She was professor of history at Te Herenga Waka Victoria University of Wellington for many years, and is now a Emeritus Professor of the university. She is one of Aotearoa New Zealand’s leading historians.

== Early life ==
Macdonald has a Bachelor of Arts (Honours) from Massey University, and a Doctor of Philosophy from the University of Auckland. The title of her 1986 doctoral thesis was Single Women as Immigrant Settlers in New Zealand, 1853–1871.

== Professional career ==
Macdonald was a professor of history at Victoria University of Wellington. Her areas of expertise include: 19th century colonies and empires; New Zealand history; gender and women's history; and cultural history of bodies, modernity, sport and spectating. Her work has been marked by innovative approaches to historical research methodology and story-telling. For example, in her 1990 book A Woman of Good Character, she analysed the data connected to the lives of over 4,000 women, in combination with more conventional historical archival work, to understand a large migrant group: single women who came to New Zealand in the 19th century. She has also edited a number of collections of New Zealand women's historical primary material, greatly increasing the availability of such material.

Macdonald wrote the Te Ara – Encyclopedia of New Zealand entry on "Women and Men" in New Zealand history.

Macdonald was awarded a Marsden Fund grant in 2014 for a project entitled "Tinker, Tailor, Soldier, Settler: Garrison and Empire in the Nineteenth Century", which has developed into the Soldiers of Empire project. A book stemming from this project, Garrison World: Redcoat Soldiers and the British Empire, was published in 2025 by Bridget Williams Books. It was shortlisted for the Ockham New Zealand Book Awards in 2026, and was awarded the prestigious Ernest Scott Prize for History in the same year, awarded annually to the best book of New Zealand or Australian history.

She was made a Fellow of the Royal Society of New Zealand Te Apārangi in 2017, and was Chair of the Society's Academy of Fellows from 2020 to 2023.

== Selected works ==
- Garrison World: Redcoat Soldiers and the British Empire, Bridget Williams Books, 2025. ISBN 9781991033703
- A Woman of Good Character: Single Women as Immigrant Settlers in Nineteenth-century New Zealand Allen & Unwin, 1990. ISBN 0046582584
- The Book of New Zealand Women / Ko kui ma te kaupapa with Merimeri Penfold, Bridget Williams Books, 1991. ISBN 0908912048
- The Vote, the Pill and the Demon Drink: A History of Feminist Writing in New Zealand, 1869–1993, Bridget Williams Books, 1993. ISBN 0908912404
- Women in History (editor, with Barbara Brookes and Margaret Tennant), Bridget Williams Books, 1992. ISBN 0908912234
- My Hand Will Write What my Heart Dictates, The Unsettled Lives of Women in Nineteenth-Century New Zealand, Bridget Williams Books, 1996. (editor, with Frances Porter), ISBN 9781869401290
- Women and Crime in New Zealand Society 1888–1910 BA (hons) thesis, Massey University.
