= Beef + Lamb New Zealand =

Farming organisation in New Zealand

Beef + Lamb New Zealand is shared naming and branding for two farmer-owned industry organisations that represent sheep and beef cattle farmers in New Zealand. Beef + Lamb New Zealand Ltd and Beef + Lamb New Zealand Inc. The latter organisation promotes beef and lamb products in the domestic New Zealand market and receives funding from farmer levies, meat processors and retailers.

== History ==
Since 1997, Beef + Lamb New Zealand Inc has promoted and managed the New Zealand Beef and Lamb Quality Mark.

In 2010, the organisation change its name from Meat and Wool New Zealand to Beef + Lamb New Zealand Ltd to advertise its focus upon meat-production.

In 2014, B+LNZ Genetics was founded by Beef + Lamb New Zealand Ltd.

In 2018, Beef + Lamb New Zealand celebrated National Lamb Day by commissioning a giant lamb chop that visited New Zealand landmarks.

In 2024, Beef + Lamb New Zealand had naming rights to a morning Olympic summary show broadcast on Sky TV.

== B+LNZ Genetics ==
B+LNZ Genetics was founded by Beef + Lamb New Zealand Ltd with funding provided by sheep and beef levy payers and the Ministry of Business, Innovation and Employment. B+LNZ also receives funding from third parties such as meat processors, breed societies, and other commercial entities involved in the sheep and beef industry. B+LNZ Genetics focuses on genetics research and development relevant for the sheep and beef industry within New Zealand. B+LNZ operates a beef genetics research programme in collaboration with the Ministry for Primary Industries. One research programme has compared genetic variation across Angus and Hereford breeds of cattle. B+LNZ Genetics staff have investigated topics such as the genetic basis for variation in sheep tails.

== See also ==
- New Zealand Meat Board
