= Keith Sinclair =

New Zealand historian (1922–1993)

Sir Keith Sinclair CBE
- Born: 5 December 1922; Auckland, New Zealand
- Died: 20 June 1993 (aged 70)
- Occupations: Historian; poet
- Political party: Labour
- Spouses: Mary Edith Land (m. 1947); Raewyn Dalziel (m. 1976)
- Relatives: Harry Sinclair (son); Stephen Sinclair (son); Jack Sinclair (brother)

Academic work
- Doctoral students: Claudia Orange, Russell Stone

Sir Keith Sinclair CBE (5 December 1922 – 20 June 1993) was a New Zealand poet and historian.

== Academic career ==
Sinclair was the oldest child of Ernest Duncan Sinclair and Florence Pyrenes Kennedy. Born and raised in Auckland, Sinclair was a student at Auckland University College, which was then part of the University of New Zealand. He was awarded a master's degree in 1946 and PhD at the college and was made a professor of history at the University of Auckland in 1963.

In 1966, Sinclair and fellow lecturer Bob Chapman established The University of Auckland Art Collection, beginning with the purchase of several paintings and drawings by Colin McCahon. The Collection is now managed by the Centre for Art Research, based at the Gus Fisher Gallery.

Sinclair won widespread acclaim for his first book of history, The Origins of the Maori Wars (1957). His next book, A History of New Zealand (1959), is often regarded as a classic in New Zealand history. The book remains in print, being revised several times, the last, with additions by fellow academic Raewyn Dalziel, in 2000. In 1967 he founded the New Zealand Journal of History.

In both his poetry and his work as a historian, Sinclair was a nationalist, in the sense that he was concerned with forging a national identity for New Zealand that was independent of its colonial origins.

== Political life ==
In the 1969 general election he was the Labour Party candidate for Eden. He won the electorate on the night, but was defeated 3 weeks later on the final count (including special votes) by only 67 votes. Later he wrote an acclaimed biography of Labour Prime Minister Walter Nash who had left his vast personal archives at Sinclair's disposal. The book won the 1977 National Book Award.

== Later life ==
In the 1983 Queen's Birthday Honours, Sinclair was appointed a Commander of the Order of the British Empire, for services to literature. Two years later, he was made a Knight Bachelor, for services to historical research and literature, in the 1985 Queen's Birthday Honours. He then taught history at the University of Auckland until his retirement in 1987. Halfway Round the Harbour, an autobiography, was published posthumously in 1993.

In 2003, the University of Auckland established the Keith Sinclair Chair in History in his honour. In 2005, he was named one of New Zealand's Top 100 History Makers.

One of his sons is the actor Harry Sinclair; another, Stephen, is a New Zealand playwright and poet.

== Bibliography ==
=== History ===
- 1957: The Origins of the Maori Wars
- 1959: A History of New Zealand
- 1965: William Pember Reeves: New Zealand Fabian
- 1967: The Liberal Government, 1891–1912: First Steps Towards a Welfare State
- 1976: Walter Nash (1976)
- 1982: A Soldier's View of Empire: the Reminiscences of James Bodell (as editor)
- 1983: A History of the University of Auckland, Auckland University Press. ISBN 0-19-648021-3
- 1986: A Destiny Apart: New Zealand's Search for a National Identity
- 1990: The Oxford Illustrated History of New Zealand (as editor)
- 1991: Kinds of Peace: Maori People After the Wars, 1870–85
- TVNZ Bateman New Zealand Encyclopaedia CD-ROM 2nd Edition

=== Poetry ===
- 1952: Songs for a Summer and Other Poems
- 1954: Strangers or Beasts: Poems
- 1963: A Time to Embrace
- 1973: The Firewheel Tree
- 1993: Moontalk

=== Other ===
- The Reefs of Fire (1977) – a children's book
- Halfway round the harbour (1993) - Autobiography

== See also ==
- James Belich, inaugural holder of the Keith Sinclair Chair in History at the University of Auckland
