= Joseph James Coleman =

Scottish inventor (1838–1888)

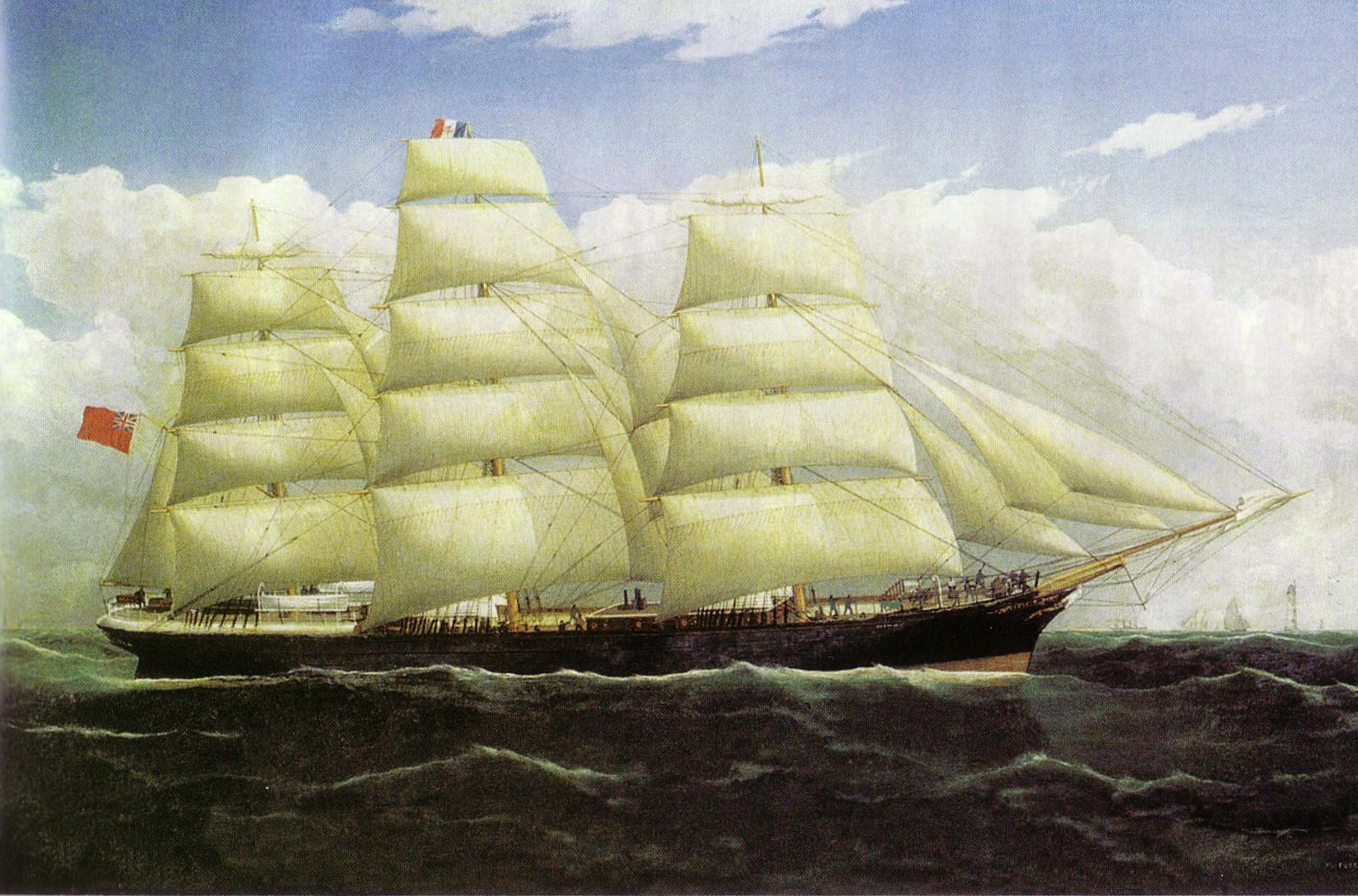
The sailing ship Dunedin, the world’s first major refrigerated ship, using the Bell-Coleman process

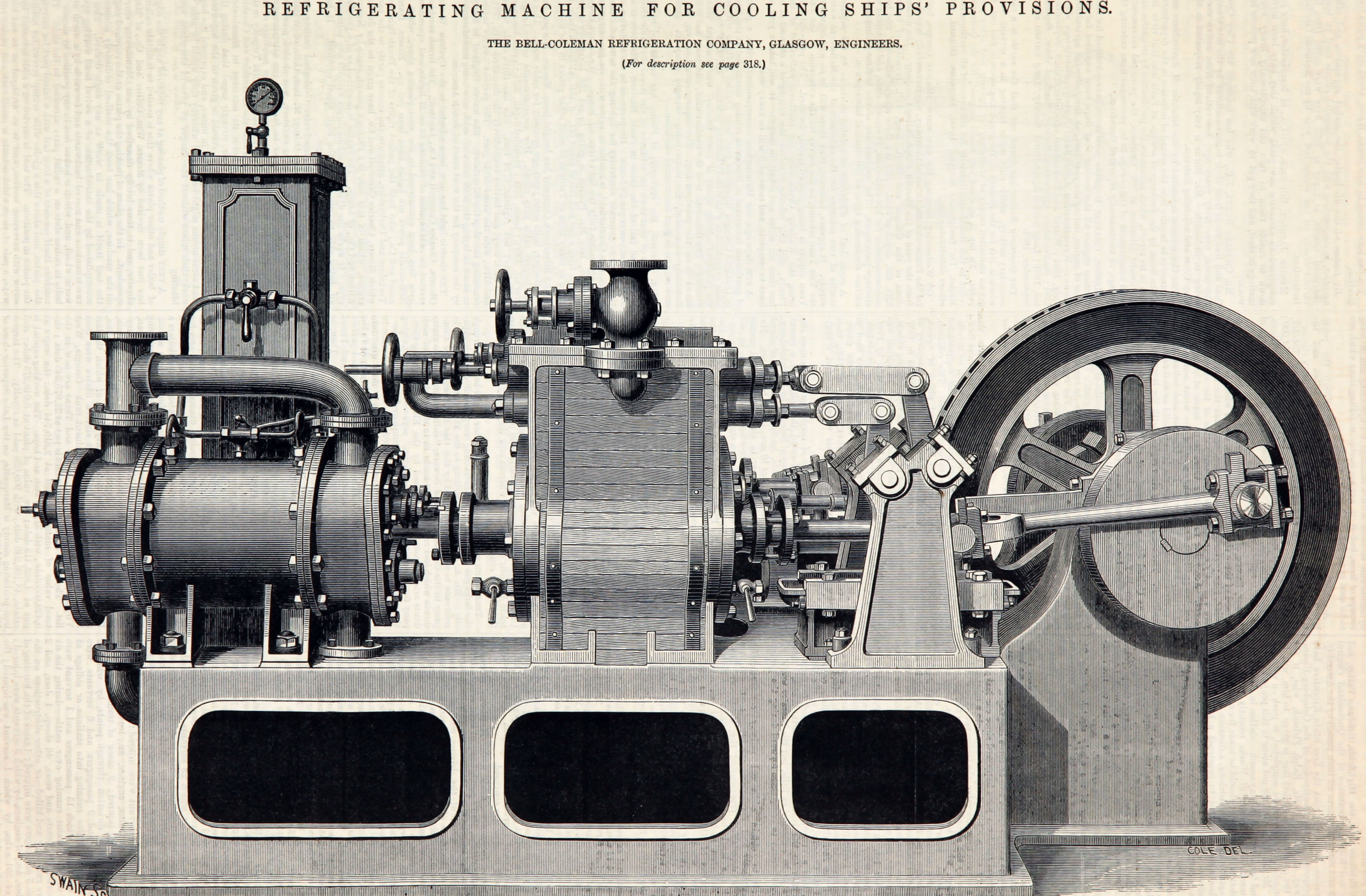
Bell-Coleman refrigerator compressor

Joseph James Coleman FRSE (often referred to simply as J. J. Coleman) (1838–1888) is credited with invention of a mechanical dry-air refrigeration process first used in the sailing ship ‘’Dunedin’’ and in other vessels of the type sometimes referred to as Reefer ships. The process, now known as the Bell-Coleman cycle, is a type of open-cycle refrigeration, specifically a compression-based gas cycle using air as the working fluid.

== Life ==
Little is known of his life other than he began his career as an industrial chemist with Young’s Paraffin, Light and Mineral Oil Company in central Scotland. He was a Fellow of the Chemical Institute and a member of the Glasgow Philosophical Society.

In 1877 he was approached by Henry and James Bell, brothers in the shipping company John Bell & Sons, and asked to create a refrigeration process for delivering beef across the Atlantic. This was patented later that year. Together they formed a new company, the Bell-Coleman Mechanical Refrigeration Company, in the same year. In 1879 they fitted out the first ship with the equipment and began trading. This was the SS Circassia. In 1880/81 at the request of New Zealand investors the sailing ship Dunedin was re-equipped as a refrigerated ship and became the first financially successful vessel as a freezer ship. The Bell brothers also took the new technology to the High Street, opening a series of butcher shops across Britain selling chilled meat also from 1879. This quickly grew, and within ten years they had 330 premises.

In the 1880s the Bell-Coleman Company is listed as having offices at 45 West Nile Street in the centre of Glasgow and J J Coleman was living at Fern Villa in Bothwell.

Coleman was elected a Fellow of the Royal Society of Edinburgh in 1886, and addressed the Society on his new process. His proposers as a Fellow included Lord Kelvin, John Gray McKendrick, James Thomson Bottomley and Sir James Dewar.

He died on 18 December 1888.
