= Morton Mains =

Locality in Southland District, Southland Region, New Zealand

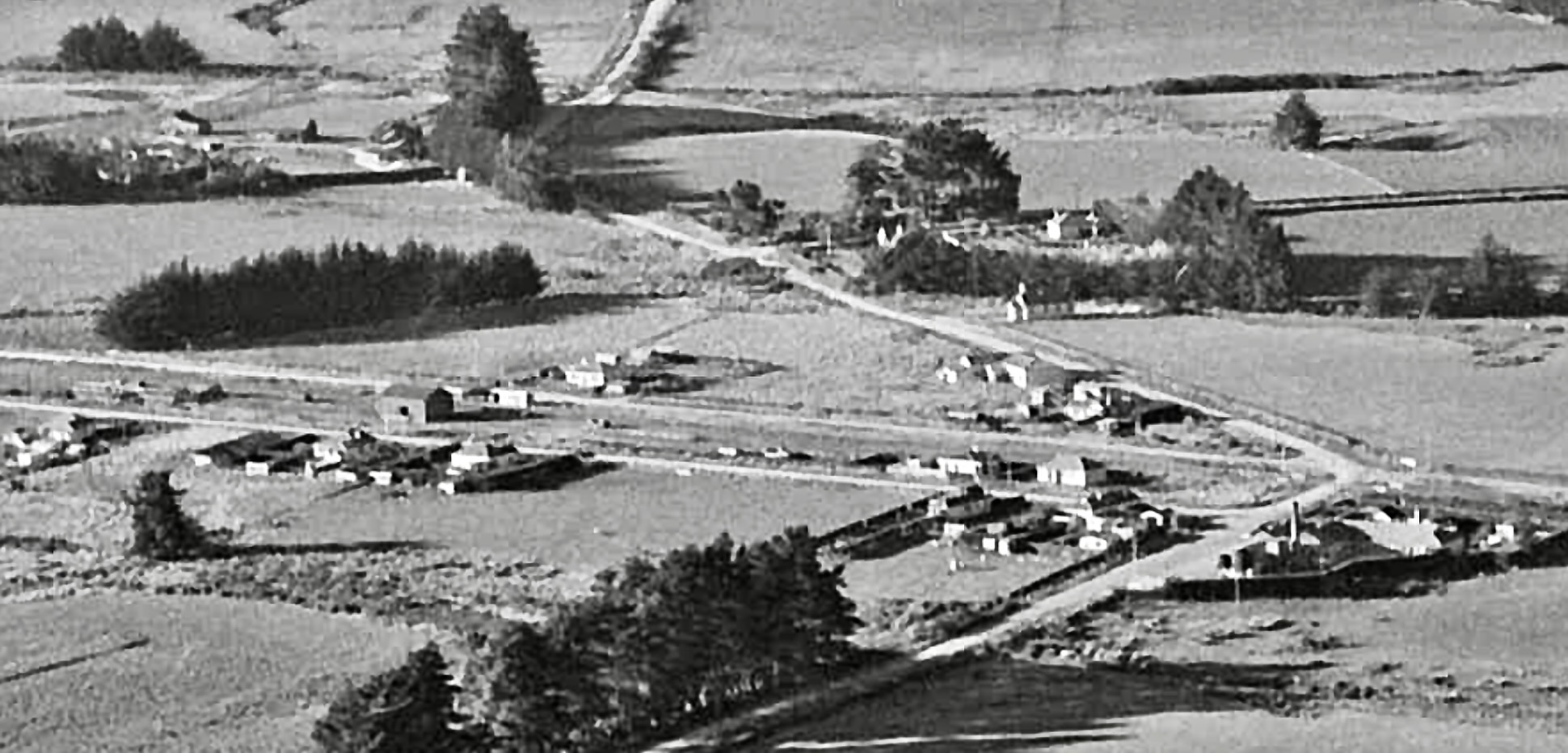
- Morton Mains in 1955, including cheese factory, church and railway station
- Interactive map of Morton Mains
- Coordinates: 46.340°S 168.650°E
- Country: New Zealand
- Region: Southland region
- Territorial authorities of New Zealand: Southland District
- Ward: Waihopai-Toetoe Ward
- Community board: Waihopai-Toetoe Community
- Electorates: Invercargill; Te Tai Tonga (Māori)

Government
  - Territorial authority: Southland District Council
  - Regional council: Southland Regional Council
  - Mayor of Southland: Rob Scott
  - Invercargill MP: Penny Simmonds
  - Te Tai Tonga MP: Tākuta Ferris

Population (2018)
  - Total: 129
- Postcode(s): 9871
- Area code: 03

Morton Mains is a village in the Southland region of New Zealand's South Island. It is northeast of Invercargill, between Woodlands and Edendale. Other nearby settlements are Dacre to the northwest and Seaward Downs to the south east. Morton Mains was named after James T. Morton, chairman of the Glasgow based, Australia and New Zealand Land Company, Mains being a Scottish term for a farm (there is a Morton Mains farm in Scotland, near Morton Castle). The village is south of State Highway 1 and on the Main South Line portion of the South Island Main Trunk Railway.

== History ==
Morton Mains lies on sediment washed down by the Mataura River. Before European settlement, Southland's flat plains were covered by bush – mataī, rimu, tawai, kānuka and mānuka, and by tussock grasslands, with wetlands in low-lying areas. Morton Mains is part of the Murihiku Block, bought by the Government in 1853, and shares it early history with the rest of Southland.

Morton Mains Public Hall opened in 1904 and was still in use in 1945. The Morton Mains Public Hall Society Inc. went into liquidation in 1968.

Morton Mains Siding School opened in 1910. It was in a small wooden building and celebrated its golden jubilee in 1961 and its 75th in 1985.

A Presbyterian church opened on 21 June 1933. It closed on 24 March 2002, when attendance had fallen to about 6.

=== Agriculture ===
The New Zealand and Australian Land Company was formed in Glasgow in March 1866 and, by 1867, had about 123,000 acres (50,000 ha), including 4,000 acres (1,600 ha) at Morton Mains. Robert Hamilton was manager at Morton Mains. The company invested in steam ploughs, harrows and other machines and by 1868 had the whole of its Morton Mains farm in cultivation, mainly producing wool. In 1879 James Morton was implicated in the collapse of the City of Glasgow Bank. In 1882 Morton Mains farm was sold to William Sloan (1845-1906, bootmaker) and W J Moffett (1827-1911, former gold digger). By 1885 the steam ploughs were rusting relics and some cattle had been introduced. The estate was divided and sold to settlers in the 1890s, who cut some of the remaining bush. In the mid 1930s experiments by the Cawthron Institute showed that trace amounts of cobalt could eliminate what was known as Morton Mains disease, or sickness in sheep.

In 1906 tenders were invited for building a dairy factory, which was producing cheese by 1907. It went into liquidation in 1958 and the building has since been converted to Morton Mains Community Centre.

About 1987 Blue Sky Meats Ltd opened a large lamb and sheep processing works, about 1.2 km (0.75 mi) to the south of the village.

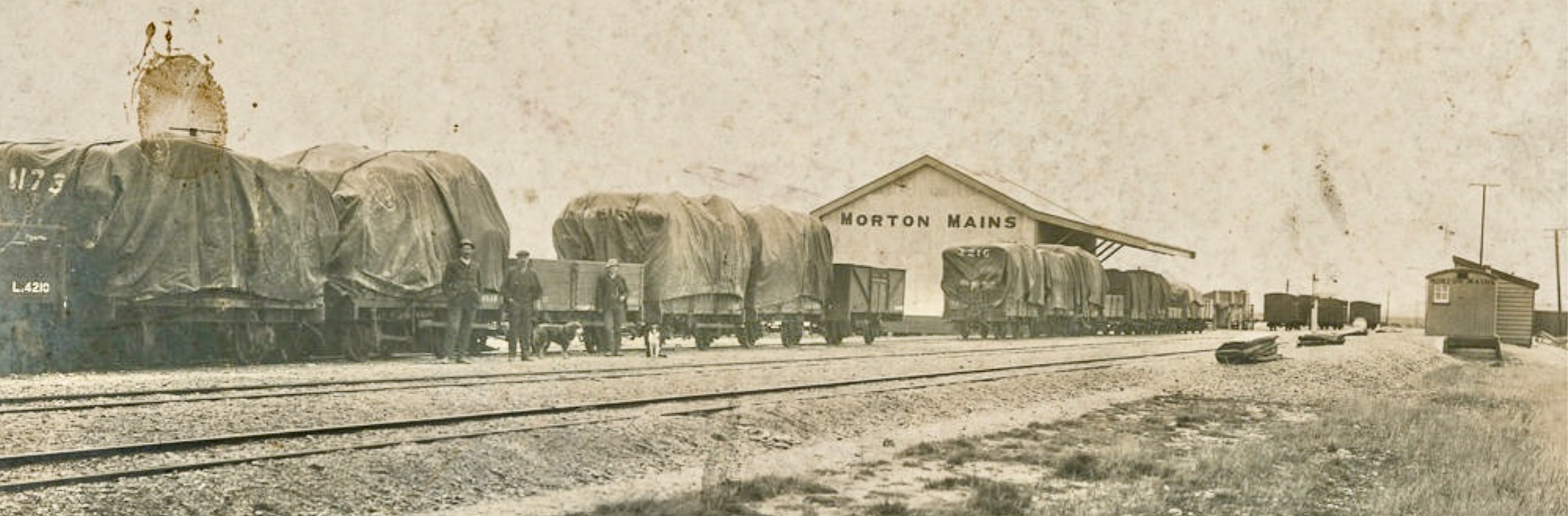
Morton Mains about 1910

=== Railway station ===
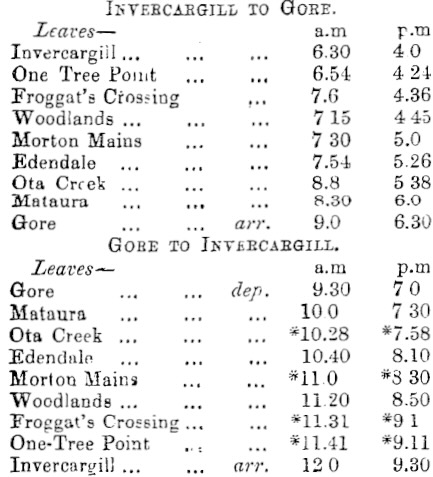
Invercargill-Gore timetable 1876 * indicates a flag station

Brogdens built the second section of the railway out of Invercargill to Mataura via Edendale, which was opened through Morton Mains on 7 June 1875. By 1882 the flag station had a shelter shed, platform, cart approach, 11 wagon goods shed siding and a passing loop for 57 wagons. A loading bank was added about 1899. There were also at least 2 railway houses, which were sold for removal in 1967. Morton Mains closed for goods other than wagonloads on 2 February 1969 and to all traffic on 5 August 1973. The railway has been freight-only since the cancellation of the Southerner passenger express on 10 February 2002. Only a single track remains.

| | Former adjoining stations | |
| Woodlands; Line open, station closed 8.18 km (5.08 mi) towards Invercargill | Main South Line | Kamahi; Line open, station closed 5.05 km (3.14 mi) towards Lyttelton |

Historical population
| Year | Pop. | ±% p.a. |
|---|---|---|
| 2006 | 123 | — |
| 2013 | 123 | +0.00% |
| 2018 | 129 | +0.96% |

== Demographics ==
Morton Mains had a population of 27 at the 1881 census, 290 in 1916, and 265 in 1956. Morton Mains (meshblock 7029314), as defined by Statistics New Zealand, covers 42.9 km^{2} (16.6 sq mi), and had a population in 2018 of 129 people, less than half of the 1956 total. It is part of the wider Edendale- Morton Mains statistical area.
