= Marlborough (1876 ship) =

Merchant sailing ship that disappeared in 1890

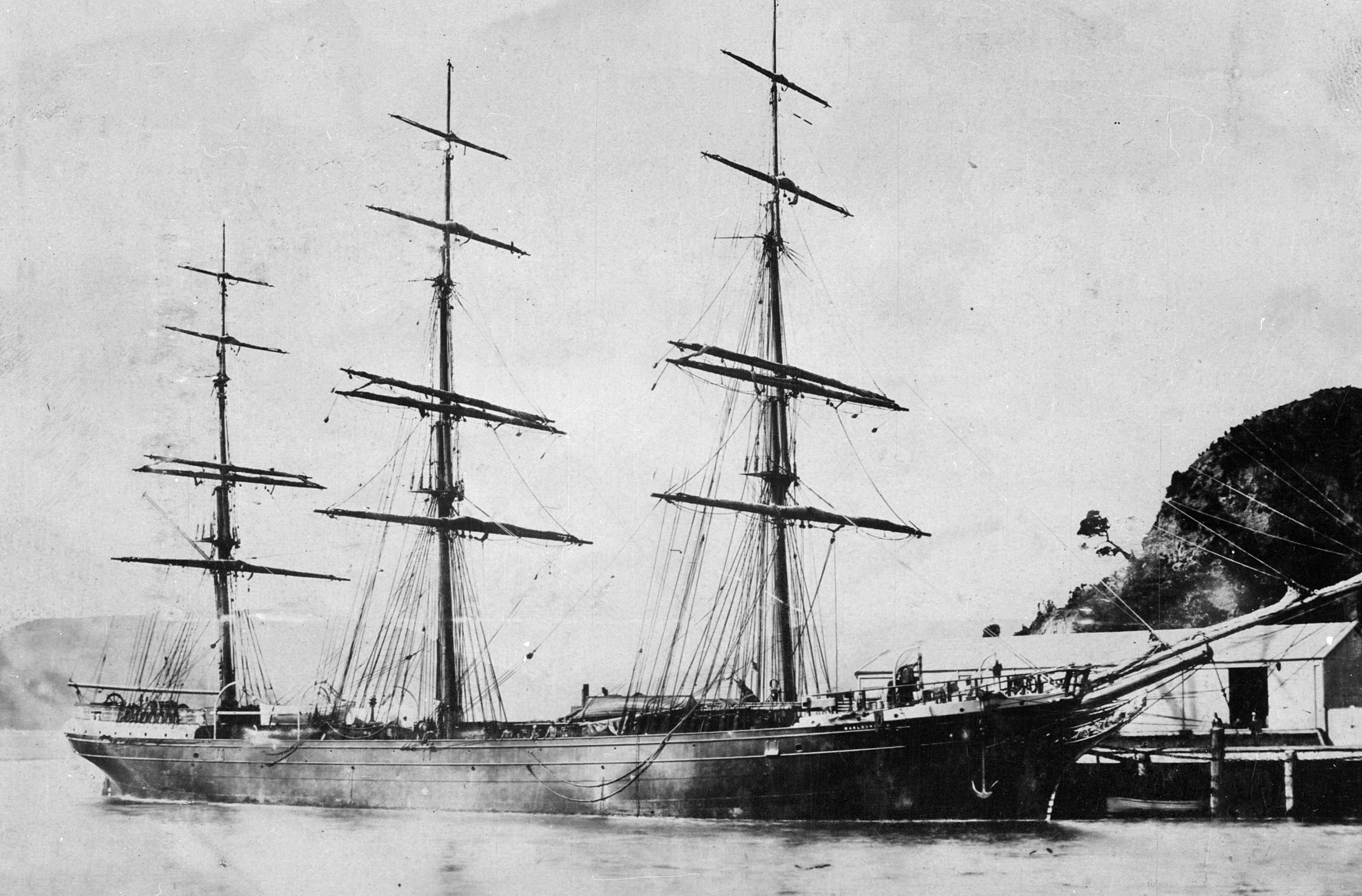
- The Marlborough in Port Chalmers

History

United Kingdom
- Name: Marlborough
- Owner: John Leslie, 79 Mark Lane, London
- Builder: Robert Duncan and Co., Port Glasgow
- Yard number: 73,858
- Launched: June 1876
- Home port: Glasgow
- Fate: Last sighted 13 January 1890, near New Zealand

General characteristics
- Type: Full-rigged ship
- Tonnage: 1191 gross, 1124 net
- Length: 228 ft (69 m)
- Beam: 35 ft (11 m)
- Draught: 21 ft 7 in (6.58 m)
- Sail plan: Three-masted full-rigged ship
- Crew: 29

Marlborough was an iron-built two-decked merchant sailing ship which disappeared in 1890. She was built by the firm of Robert Duncan and Co., Port Glasgow and launched in 1876. First managed by James Galbraith for the Albion Shipping Company, she was registered in 1880 to the ownership of John Leslie of London, while continuing to operate within the fleet of Albion Line. Marlborough disappeared during a voyage in January 1890, and has not been seen or heard from in over a century. Searches and investigations have yielded nothing conclusive, and the ship's ultimate fate, and that of her crew, remains unknown.

== Origins ==
The ship was commanded by Captain Anderson from 1876 to 1883, with a crew of 29, when she made voyages to Lyttelton, New Zealand and Dunedin, also making some very fast passages home to the United Kingdom, on one occasion, in 1880, travelling from Lyttelton to the Lizard in Cornwall in 71 days.

Marlborough made 14 successful voyages with immigrants from London to New Zealand up to 1890, most often returning with cargoes of wool and frozen meat. She had been converted to refrigeration as soon as the success of the venture was proven by another Albion ship, the Dunedin, and carried her first shipment in 1882. In 1884 Captain Herd took over command and was aboard her at the time of her voyage from Lyttelton to London in 1890, when she disappeared without trace.

== Last voyage ==
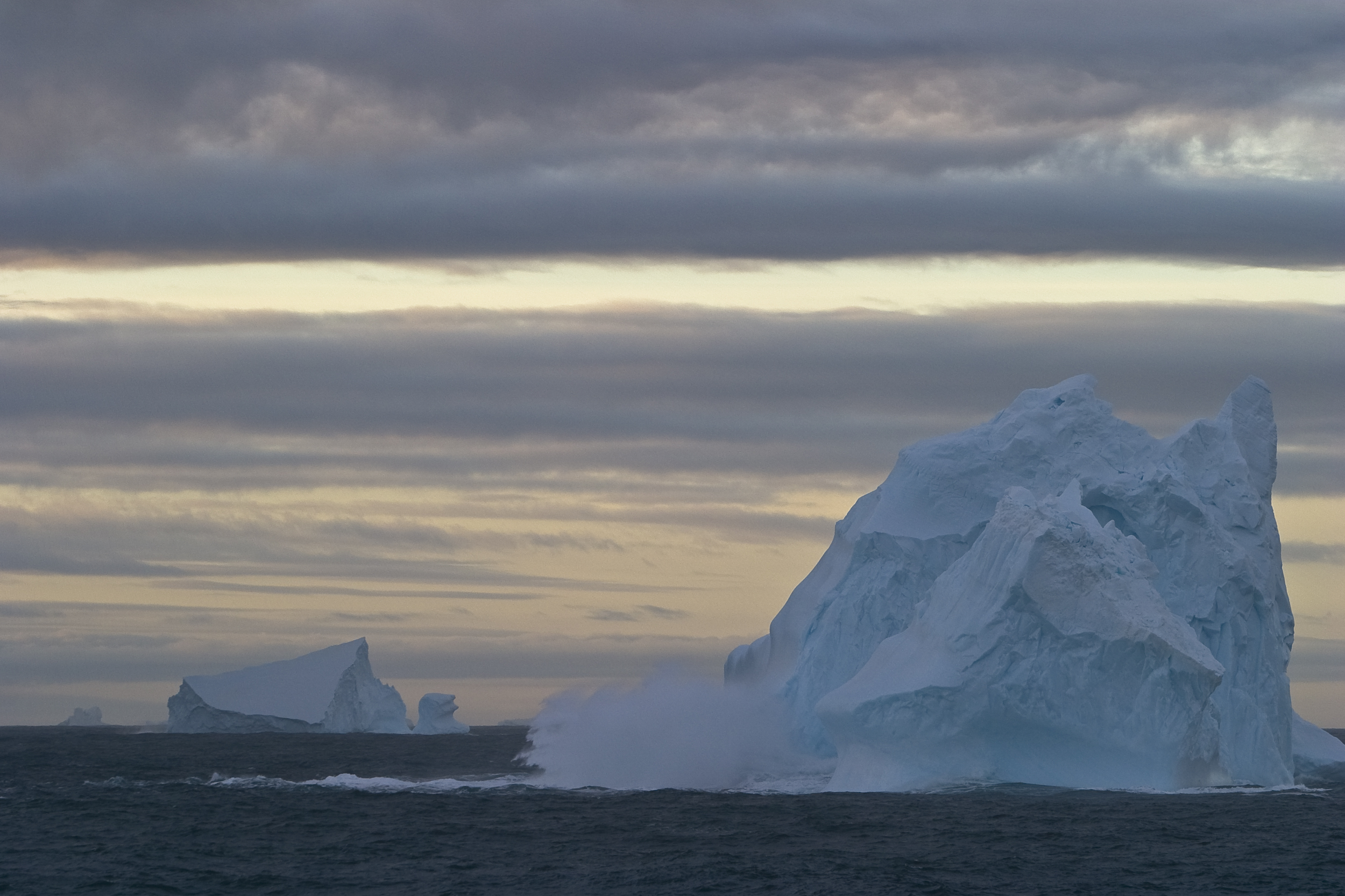
Southern Ocean icebergs

On 11 January 1890, the Marlborough departed Lyttelton bound for London, with a cargo of frozen meat and wool, with a crew of twenty-nine men and one female passenger (Mrs W B Anderson). Two days later she was spoken to by Captain Gordon of one J J Craig's barques, The Falkland Hill. After this encounter all contact was lost. When no word of her came after a long wait, an inquiry was made as to her condition when she sailed, where it was proved that the cargo was properly stowed and the ship well founded in good trim for the voyage. After some months the ship was posted at Lloyd's as "missing" and general opinion was that the ship had been sunk by icebergs, which were frequently encountered near Cape Horn.

RMS Rimutaka reported that there were great quantities of ice in the Southern Ocean between the Chatham Islands and Cape Horn when she sailed through the area in early to mid February. This was at the same time as the Marlborough would have been in the vicinity. The Marlborough's Captain Herd was noted for running well to the south because the shortest distance between Lyttelton and Cape Horn, using Great-circle navigation, is partially inside the Antarctic Circle and about as far as 68 degrees south at the southernmost point.

Significant sized Antarctic icebergs have been observed at least as far north as 50 degrees south in the Pacific Ocean, which is well inside the sailing routes of the time. Cape Horn is located at 56 degrees south.

Alex Carson, a ship's apprentice on Marlborough, was meant to have sailed on this journey but fell ill before the ship sailed. His illness effectively saved his life.

== Search by HMS Garnet ==
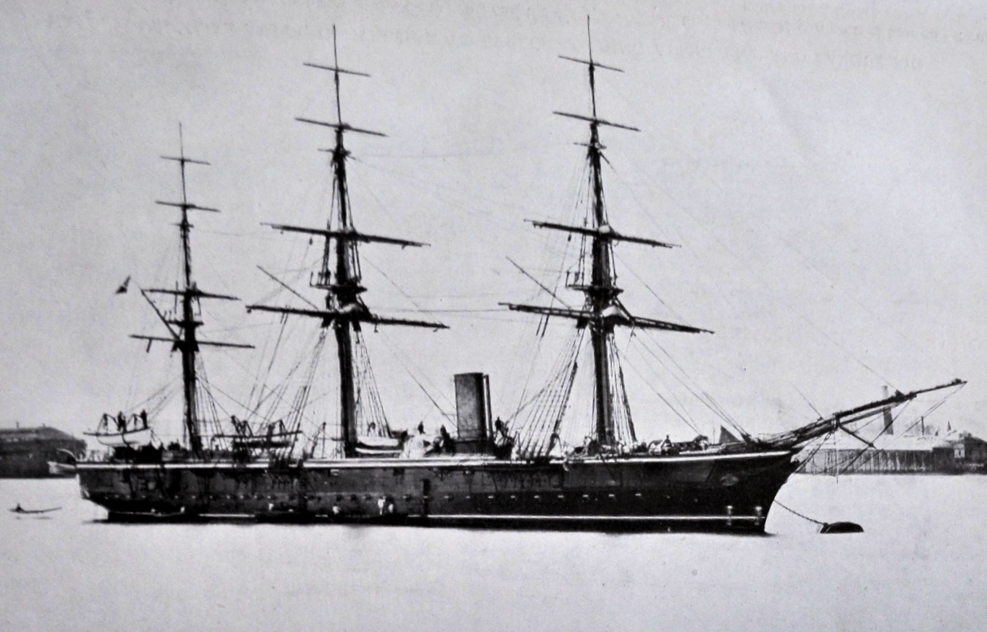
Emerald class corvette

A search was mounted by HMS Garnet, an Emerald-class corvette from the Pacific Squadron under Captain Harry Francis Hughes-Hallett, for the crews of Marlborough and Dunedin in mid-1891 as a result of a rumour that there were crew members sighted near Good Success Bay, Tierra del Fuego. The story that prompted the search had been originally printed in The Daily Colonist, a Victoria, British Columbia newspaper, on 9 April 1891 and stated that a Brown Brothers sealing schooner Maud S under Captain R E McKiel had, in mid to late January 1891, encountered number of men purporting to be shipwrecked British sailors impressed into service by the Argentine government at the life saving station in Good Success Bay. The Garnet searched the bay and surrounding area. No sailors were found, nor was there any evidence of their existence.

== Fate of the crew and passengers ==
Two stories are often reproduced regarding the fate of the Marlborough, which have been debunked by author Basil Lubbock in his The Last of the Windjammers. They were the Ghost ship and the Burley account. The ghost ship story is considered fictional, while the Burley account is considered one of mistaken identity.

=== Ghost ship ===
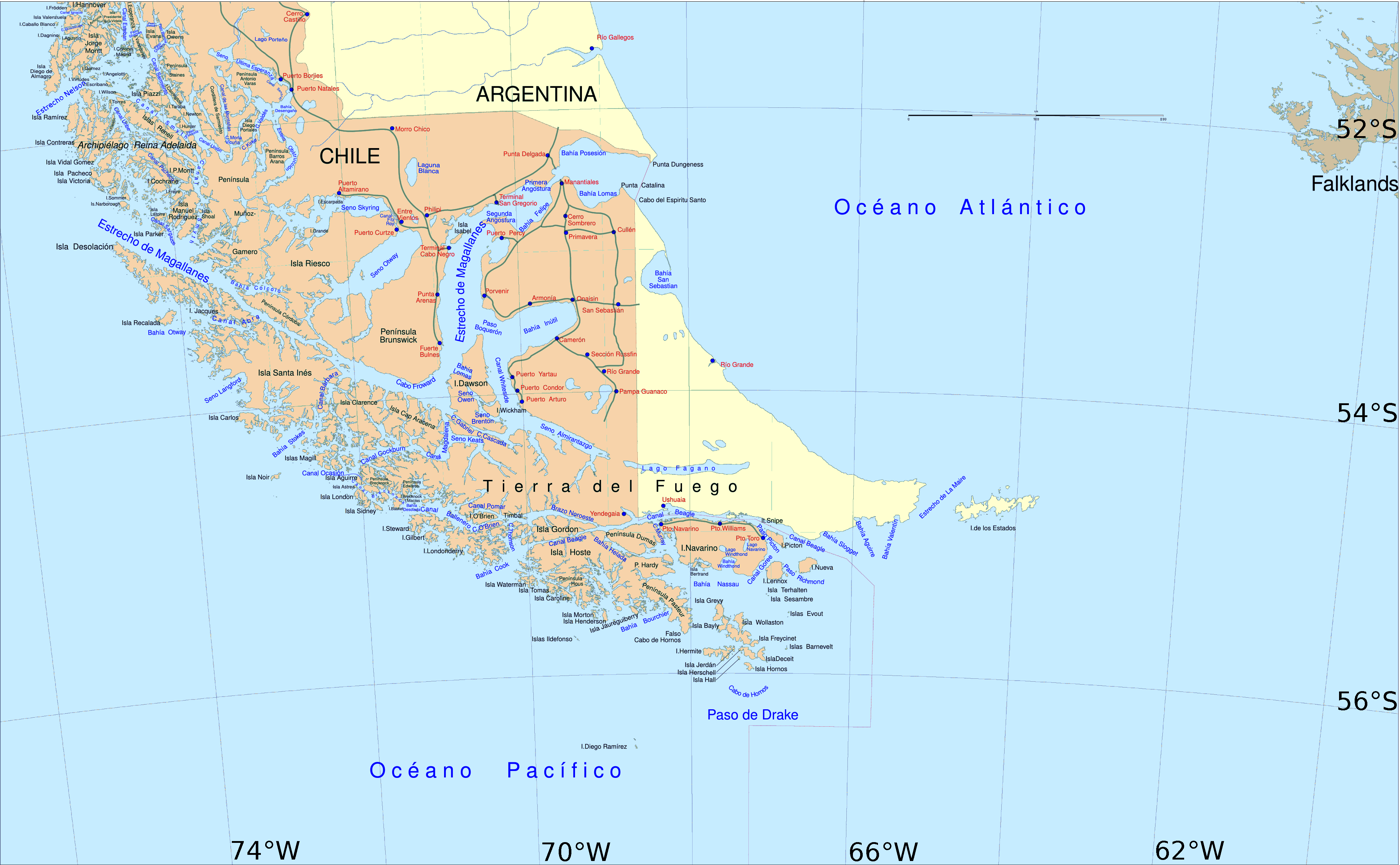
Cape Horn and environs

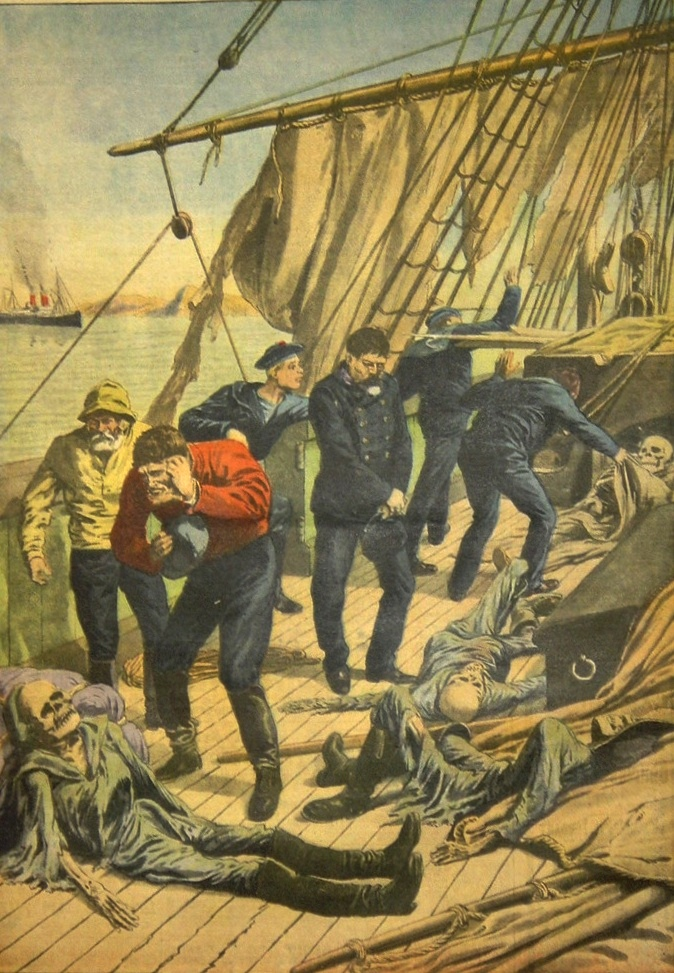
The discovery of the Marlborough as depicted by Le Petit Journal in 1913

In October 1913, the Singapore newspaper The Straits Times published a story according to which the Marlborough had been discovered near Cape Horn with the skeletons of her crew that were slimy to the touch on board. The Straits Times attributed the story to one published the London paper the Evening Standard of 3 October 1913. The Evening Standard mentioned that the story was based on an "account cabled from New Zealand" which was yet to be confirmed. The ship that sighted the Marlborough in 1913 was said to be the sailing ship Johnson. The date of the find is said to have been eight weeks prior to publication, which would make the ships finding as being the late July to early August 1913 period.

Further details of the discovery of the missing ship come via London. It appears that some considerable time back the sad truth was learned by a British vessel bound home from Lyttelton after rounding Cape Horn. The story told by the captain is intensely dramatic. He says: 'We were off the rocky coves near Punta Arenas, keeping near the land for shelter. The coves are deep and silent, the sailing is difficult and dangerous. It was a weirdly wild evening, with the red orb of the sun setting on the horizon. The stillness was uncanny. There was a shining green light reflected on the jagged rocks on our right. We rounded a point into a deep cleft rock. Before us, a mile or more across the water, stood a vessel, with the barest shreds of canvas fluttering in the breeze. We signaled and hove to. No answer came. We searched the "stranger" with our glasses. Not a soul could we see; not a movement of any sort. Masts and yards were picked out in green – the green of decay. The vessel lay as if in a cradle. It recalled the "Frozen Pirate" a novel that I read years ago. I conjured up the vessel of the novel, with her rakish masts and the outline of her six small cannon traced with snow. At last we came up. There was no sign of life on board. After an interval our first mate, with a number of the crew, boarded her. The sight that met their gaze was thrilling. Below the wheel lay the skeleton of a man. Treading warily on the rotten decks, which cracked and broke in places as they walked, they encountered three skeletons in the hatchway. In the mess-room were the remains of ten bodies, and six others were found, one alone, possibly the captain, on the bridge. There was an uncanny stillness around, and a dank smell of mold, which made the flesh creep. A few remnants of books were discovered in the captain's cabin, and a rusty cutlass. Nothing more weird in the history of the sea can ever have been seen. The first mate examined the still faint letters on the bow and after much trouble read 'Marlborough, Glasgow.'

— Newspaper report, 1913

The points against this story are that:

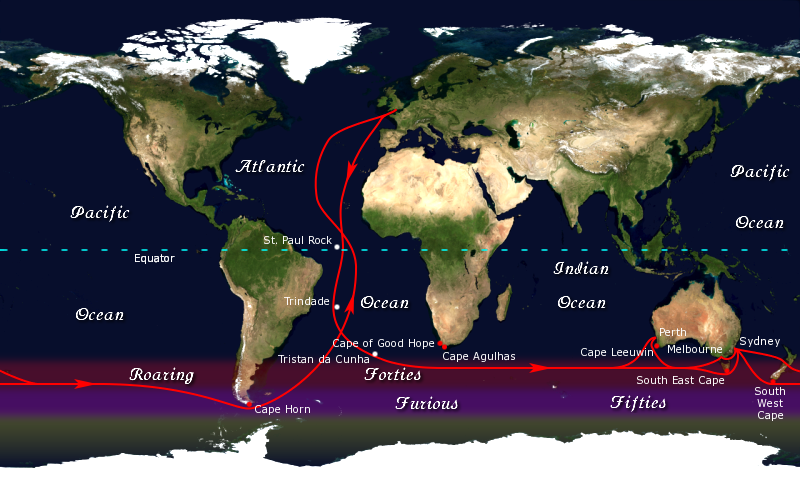
The Clipper Route followed by ships sailing between England and Australia/New Zealand.

- The area around Cape Horn is subject to severe storms, strong eastwards currents, and icebergs. Any drifting vessel would more likely have been driven on to rocks or into icebergs rather than gently floating around for over 20 years.
- The Cape was on a major shipping route making the likelihood of any vessel remaining undetected for such a long length of time improbable (the Panama Canal did not open until 1914 and this was the quickest route for ships from the American Pacific Coast to the Atlantic).
- Punta Arenas was a significant settlement, and minor gold rush had started in the area in the 1890s, further reducing the likelihood of the ship remaining undetected.
- The area around the Cape was searched quite regularly for missing ships and their crews due to the high number of shipping disasters in the area.
- Sailing ships like the Johnson would not normally sail on this route to reach New Zealand – the usual route being the Clipper route around the Cape of Good Hope if sailing from England (see map).
- The Johnson was not listed as being in a New Zealand port between 1912 and 1913.
- No record has been found of a sailing ship called the Johnson in 1913.
- Had such an event occurred, it would have been widely reported in New Zealand newspapers at the time the Johnson was supposed to have arrived in New Zealand.
- There were no follow-up stories in the papers that did report the find, although they indicated they would.
- The story was considered untrue in New Zealand newspapers in 1914, while the Burley account was thought plausible.
- There was no follow-up search for the Marlborough when this would be likely.
- The Marlborough did not have a bridge.

==== Variations to the ghost ship story ====
===== 1929 version =====
Another account of this story was published in 1929. In this account the Marlborough was found adrift in January 1899 by the ship British Isles under Captain Hadrop. The British Isles was purportedly sailing from Lyttelton to England. She was a little north of Cape Horn by Staten Island when the Marlborough was sighted and boarded. This story was discounted because there were no reports of the British Isles visiting Lyttelton in the time period, and it was improbable that Hadrop would have waited so many years to report the sighting.

The British Isles was a 2394-ton iron clad sailing ship built in 1884 and owned the British Shipowners Company. She was sold to Thomas Shute in 1899. In August 1898 the British Isles was at San Francisco. She sailed from there to England around the Horn with a load of wheat. The ship's captain on this voyage was James M Stott. This puts the ship in the area at roughly the time claimed, but does not address why the sighting was not reported. It also had the wrong Captain, there being no record of Hadrop ever being a captain of the British Isles and sailing from a port it is not known to have visited.

===== 2006 version =====
In 2006 a further version was published in a book by Tom Quinn. In this version the Marlborough was found by a British Royal Navy vessel off the coast of Chile in 1913. Neither the naval vessel nor its captain were named, nor was the source of the information. Given the interest in Marlborough in the newspapers of 1913, it is highly improbable that there is any truth in Quinn's claim. Such a sighting would have been widely reported.

=== Burley account ===
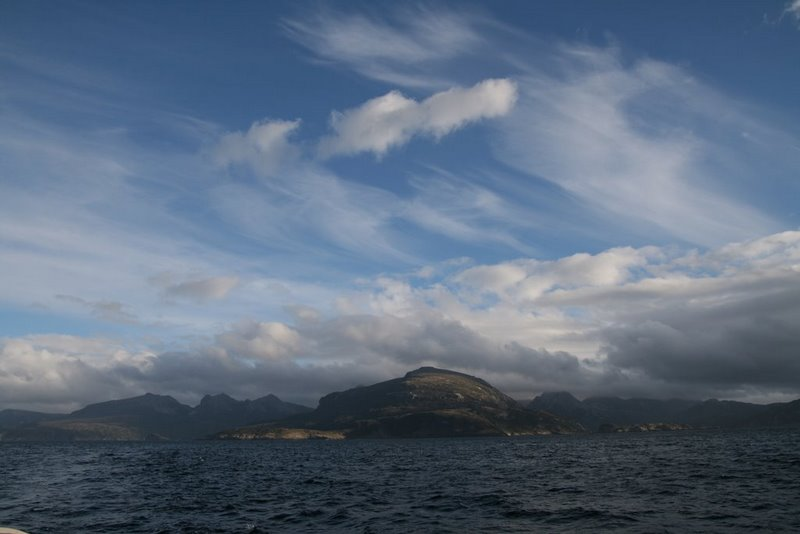
Staten Island (Isla de los Estados) from Le Maire Strait

The origin of the Ghost Ship story is thought to have been an imaginative story loosely based on Captain Thomas Sydney Burley's 1912 account, which had circulated in England. In September 1913, the Evening Post, a Wellington, New Zealand newspaper, published a story attributed to Captain McArthur of the Blue Funnel Steamers. The story was in a letter by a Shaw, Savill & Albion Line captain to a Dunedin shipping man. This account differed in that it stated that two shipwrecked sailors had found the skeletons of the crew on shore and the ship some distance away. The story was supposedly discredited by October with Captain Herd's son advising that the story had circulated in 1912 and was untrue particularly because his father would not have sailed through Le Maire Strait where the ship was supposed to have been found. Ships tended to avoid the Strait as it was considered hazardous.

In February 1914 the Evening Post published a follow-up article attributed to its London correspondent that stated Captain Thomas Sydney Burley of Puget Sound was one of the crew members that had found the boat and that they had been wrecked in the 1890s, not 1912 as Herd's son had supposed. Burley was the owner of the Tacoma Barge and Tug Company and a pilot for Blue Funnel Steamers when the 1914 article was published. The paper stated the wreck had been sighted six to seven miles north of Good Success Bay and in sight (on a clear day) of Staten Island. The article also has Burley describing the ship as "a London ship, the Marlborough", when she was in fact registered in Glasgow Herd's comment that his father would not have sailed in this part of the Cape was also addressed.

According to an article in the 24 November 1923 issue of the Auckland Star, in 1919 an additional report had been published in an unspecified Glasgow newspaper which suggested that the crew had been sighted on shore in 1891, but that the passing ship had been unable to rescue them. This would seem to be taken in part from the 1891 report by the Canadian sealing schooner Maud S. According to the Auckland Star, the Glasgow story also repeated the first story about the ship being discovered in 1913 with a dead crew on board.

A more detailed account of Captain Burley claim was printed in 1940. Burley claimed to have been on the barque Cordova which he said was wrecked off Tierra del Fuego on 23 July 1890. The survivors attempted to reach Good Success Bay on Mitre Peninsula, and on the way passed the wreck of a barque named Godiva. They did not see the Marlborough, but did find a few miles south of the wreck of the Godiva a ships boat marked "Marlborough of London" pulled up above the high tide mark. It was also claimed that they had found a tent made from sail canvas and seven skeletons with a pile of mussel shells.

Based on this, Burley's account looks more like one of mistaken identity because, while his story matches the account of the Cordova's demise and subsequent rescue of four crew members in September 1888, the date of the Cordova's foundering was about 26 July 1888. The crew of the Cordova were rescued a year and a half before the Marlborough might have sailed through the area. Burley, who was born in England in 1871 arrived in Washington in 1890. He may have got the two dates muddled as the report was over 20 years after the event. Even as far back as 1913 Burley's account was thought to have been one of mistaken identity.

Lubbock points out that the coast of Tierra del Fuego inside the Le Maire Strait would be an odd location for a vessel bound round Cape Horn from the west – as the Marlborough was – to go aground, or even for a boat from her to make a landing.

==== The Iquique ====
Another possible explanation for Burley's account, and more likely, is that the boat they found was from the H Fölsch & Co, Hamburg's 899 ton barque Iquique. She went missing after being spoken with at Cape Horn on 1 June 1883. There were 30 crew on board.

The Iquique had originally been called the Marlborough when built in 1862. She was sold to Fölsch and renamed in 1882. The Iquique had sailed from Newcastle On Tyne in February 1883 under Captain G Eduard Jessen with a load of coal for Iquique, Chile.

Had any of her crew managed to reach Good Success Bay in 1883 they would have been in a desolate and dangerous place. The natives were hostile and the climate severe. The only hope of rescue was if a passing ship spotted them. The Argentine government established a settlement in Good Success Bay only in late 1887, four years after the Iquique went missing.

== Fate of her fleetmate ship – the Dunedin ==
The Dunedin set sail for London two months after the Marlborough on 19 March 1890. She too disappeared without trace.
