= Raewyn Dalziel =

New Zealand historian

Raewyn Dalziel ONZM
- Spouse: Keith Sinclair

Academic background
- Education: BA(Hons), PhD Victoria University of Wellington

Academic work
- Discipline: History, social history
- Institutions: University of Auckland
- Doctoral students: Charlotte Macdonald

Raewyn Mary Dalziel ONZM is a New Zealand historian specialising in New Zealand social history.

== Career ==
Dalziel was Deputy Vice Chancellor (Academic) of the University of Auckland from 1999 to 2009. She is an emeritus professor of history at the university.

In 2013, she was appointed chair of Museum of New Zealand Te Papa Tongarewa's Research Advisory Panel.

In 2014, Dalziel established the Ellen Castle Undergraduate Scholarship at the University of Auckland, in memory of her mother.

== Honours and awards ==
In the 2004 Queen's Birthday Honours, Dalziel was appointed an Officer of the New Zealand Order of Merit, for services to education.

== Personal life ==
In 1976, Dalziel married fellow historian Keith Sinclair.

== Selected publications ==
=== Books ===
- Dalziel, R. (1968). Sir Julius Vogel. Wellington: Reed.
- Dalziel, R. (1975). The origins of New Zealand diplomacy: The Agent-General in London, 1870–1905. Wellington: Price Milburn for Victoria University Press.
- Sinclair, K., & Dalziel, R. (2000). A history of New Zealand. Auckland. Penguin.

=== Articles ===
- Dalziel, R. (1 January 1977). The colonial helpmeet: Women's role and the vote in nineteenth-century New Zealand. New Zealand Journal of History, 112–122.
- Dalziel, R. (1 January 1994). Review article on publications marking the centenary of women's suffrage in New Zealand. Australian Feminist Studies, 19, 191–197.
- Dalziel, R. (18 December 2014). A Blighted Fame: George S. Evans 1802–1868, A Life. The Journal of New Zealand Studies, 18.
- Dalziel, R. (1 January 2017). The Privileged Crime: Policing and Prosecuting Bigamy in Nineteenth-Century New Zealand. New Zealand Journal of History, 51, 2, 1–25.
- Dalziel, R. (1986). Education was the key. In Clark, Margaret (ed). Beyond Expectations: fourteen New Zealand women write about their lives. Allen & Unwin. p. 125–142.
