= Margaret Tennant =

New Zealand historian

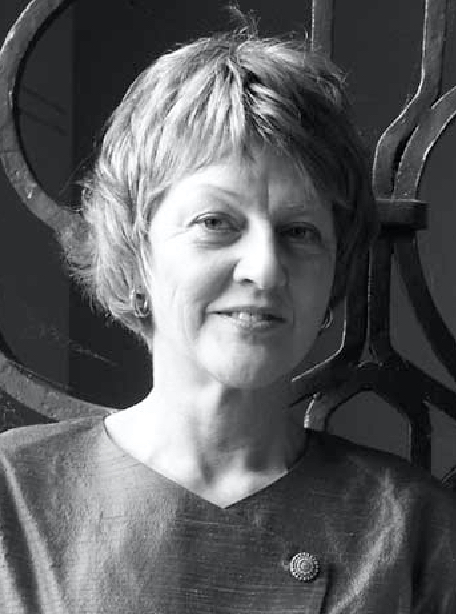
- Tennant in 2007
- Education: Massey University
- Scientific career
- Fields: New Zealand history
- Workplaces: Massey University
- Thesis: Indigence and charitable aid in New Zealand 1885–1920 (1981)
- Doctoral advisor: W. H. Oliver

Margaret Anne Tennant is a New Zealand historian, currently Professor Emeritus at Massey University.

Tennant's master's thesis, completed in 1976 at Massey University, was called Matrons with a mission, and was a study of women's organisations 1893–1915. Her doctoral thesis was completed in 1981, and concerned the charitable aid system in New Zealand.

Tennant has written for Te Ara: The Encyclopedia of New Zealand.

Tennant was elected a Fellow of the Royal Society of New Zealand in 2009 and is currently on the Council. In 2017, Tennant was selected as one of the Royal Society Te Apārangi's "150 women in 150 words", celebrating the contributions of women to knowledge in New Zealand.

== Selected works ==
- Past Judgement: Social Policy in New Zealand History Bronwyn Dalley and Margaret Tennant, Otago University Press. ISBN
- Paupers & providers : charitable aid in New Zealand Allen & Unwin, 1989. ISBN 0046140204
- Children's health, the nation's wealth : a history of children's health camps Bridget Williams Books, 1994. ISBN 0908912684
- Through the prison gate : 125 years of prisoners' aid and rehabilitation New Zealand Prisoners' Aid & Rehabilitation Society, 2002. ISBN 0473089890
- Matrons with a mission : women's organisations in New Zealand, 1893–1915 MA Thesis, Massey University, 1976 http://hdl.handle.net/10179/5755
