= William Davidson (agribusinessman) =

New Zealand pioneer of refrigerated shipping

William Soltau Davidson (15 June 1846 – 17 July 1924) was the New Zealand pioneer of refrigerated shipping.

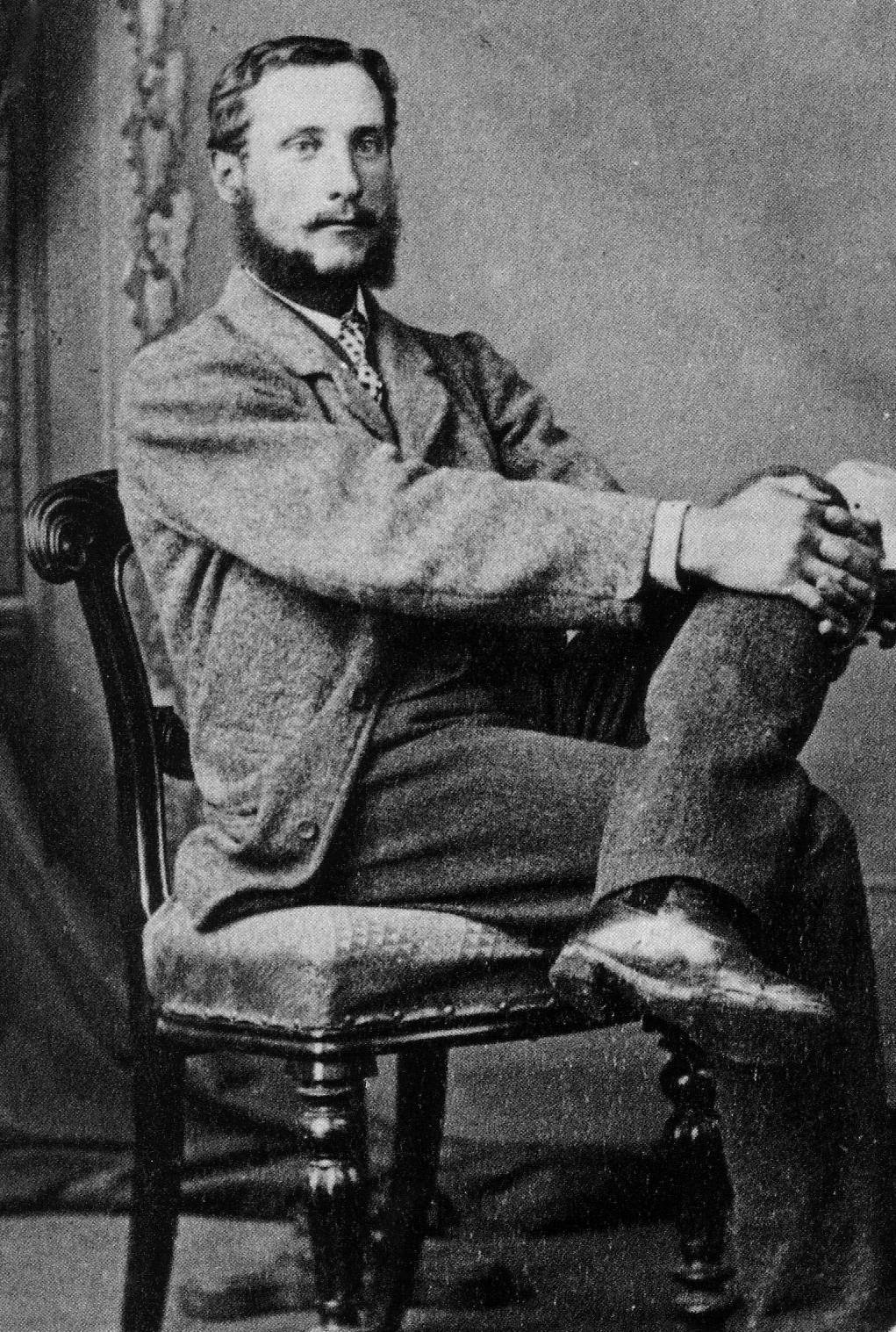
William Davidson

== Early life ==
Son of Frances Pillans and bank manager David Davidson, William Davidson was born in Montreal, Canada. He attended the Edinburgh Academy, (his father having become Edinburgh manager of the Bank of Scotland), before taking a position book keeping in Glasgow. Davidson was planning to work on a ranch in Argentina, when, while travelling by train, met Canterbury and Otago Association shareholder James Morton. On the strength of their conversation during the journey, Morton hired William Davidson as a cadet - and persuaded his father to invest £10,000.

== Sheep farming in New Zealand ==
William Davidson arrived in Port Chalmers on 30 December 1865 in the ship Celaeno. He was sent to the company's 600 square kilometres (230 sq mi) farm at Timaru where he spent two years as a shepherd under James Hassell, being responsible for the 85,000 Merino sheep. By the end of the two years, Davidson was overseeing 15 Scottish shepherds, and had helped survey and fence much of the previously open land. Using £150,000 borrowed from the company, he purchased more land., increasing holdings to 2,000 square kilometres (770 sq mi). He also assisted James Little in his experiments to cross Merinos with Lincoln Stud rams, producing the Corriedale breed. In 1875, he was made superintendent.

On a trip back to Edinburgh, Davidson married Jane Emily Davidson, daughter of the sheriff of Midlothian, in October 1873.

In 1878 the Canterbury and Otago Association amalgamated with James Morton's other venture, the New Zealand and Australian Land Company, and now incorporated over a 10,000 square kilometres (3,900 sq mi) between the two countries. However, when Morton was implicated in the collapse of the City of Glasgow Bank the following year, and bankrupted, the banks liquidators (holding nearly half the new company's stock), attempted to sell the land to realise their assets. Davidson replaced Morton as General Manager, and persuaded Morton's creditors to continue to hold all but the most marginal land.

== Refrigeration ==
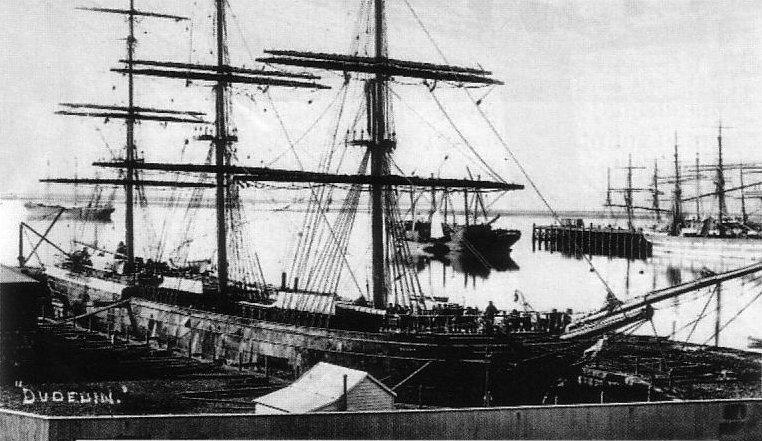
The Dunedin loading at Port Chalmers in 1882.

At the time, sheep were farmed only for wool. With the success of the Antipodean farmers, international wool markets suffered from supply outpacing demand, and between 1873 and 1888 wool prices fell by a third. Davidson had been looking to the United Kingdom's increasing population and fixed food supply to provide a solution. He converted some land to dairying in Southland, helping establish a cheese making industry in Edendale. However his real hopes were to find a use other than wool for the company's vast herds of sheep. New Zealand had attempted to export meat in cans in the 1870s, however while popular in the South Pacific islands to this day, canned meat did not sell well in Europe. Live shipment was prohibitively expensive. Assorted experiments in refrigerated shipping had been attempted in the mid-1870s - sometimes successful on a small scale, but generally not successful on a larger scale. The first attempt to ship refrigerated sheep meat from Australia had resulted in the loss of the whole cargo.

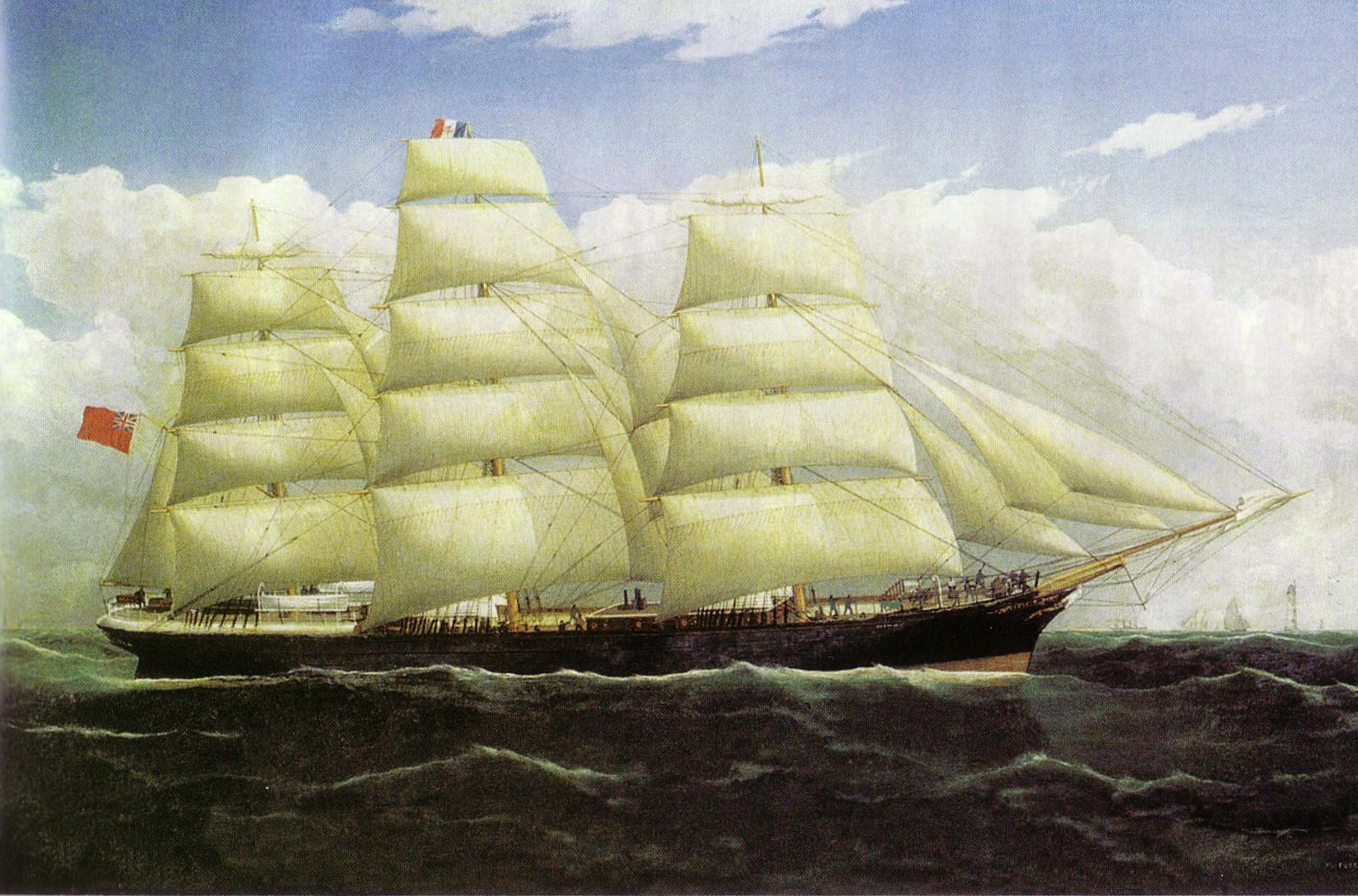
The Dunedin in 1876. Painting by Frederick Tudgay (1841–1921), 47 cm by 77 cm oil on canvas.

Working with his successor as Superintendent, Thomas Brydone, Davidson inspected refrigerated ships, and researched different methods of refrigeration. In 1881 he arranged for the Dunedin to be refitted with a compression refrigeration unit, and supervised the establishment of a slaughter works at Totara Estate, Oamaru. Despite the loss of 650 carcases when the crankshaft of the compressor broke, on 15 February 1882, the Dunedin sailed for London with what was to be the first commercially successful refrigerated shipping voyage, and the foundation of both this industry and New Zealand's early lead in it.

== The refrigerated shipping industry expands ==
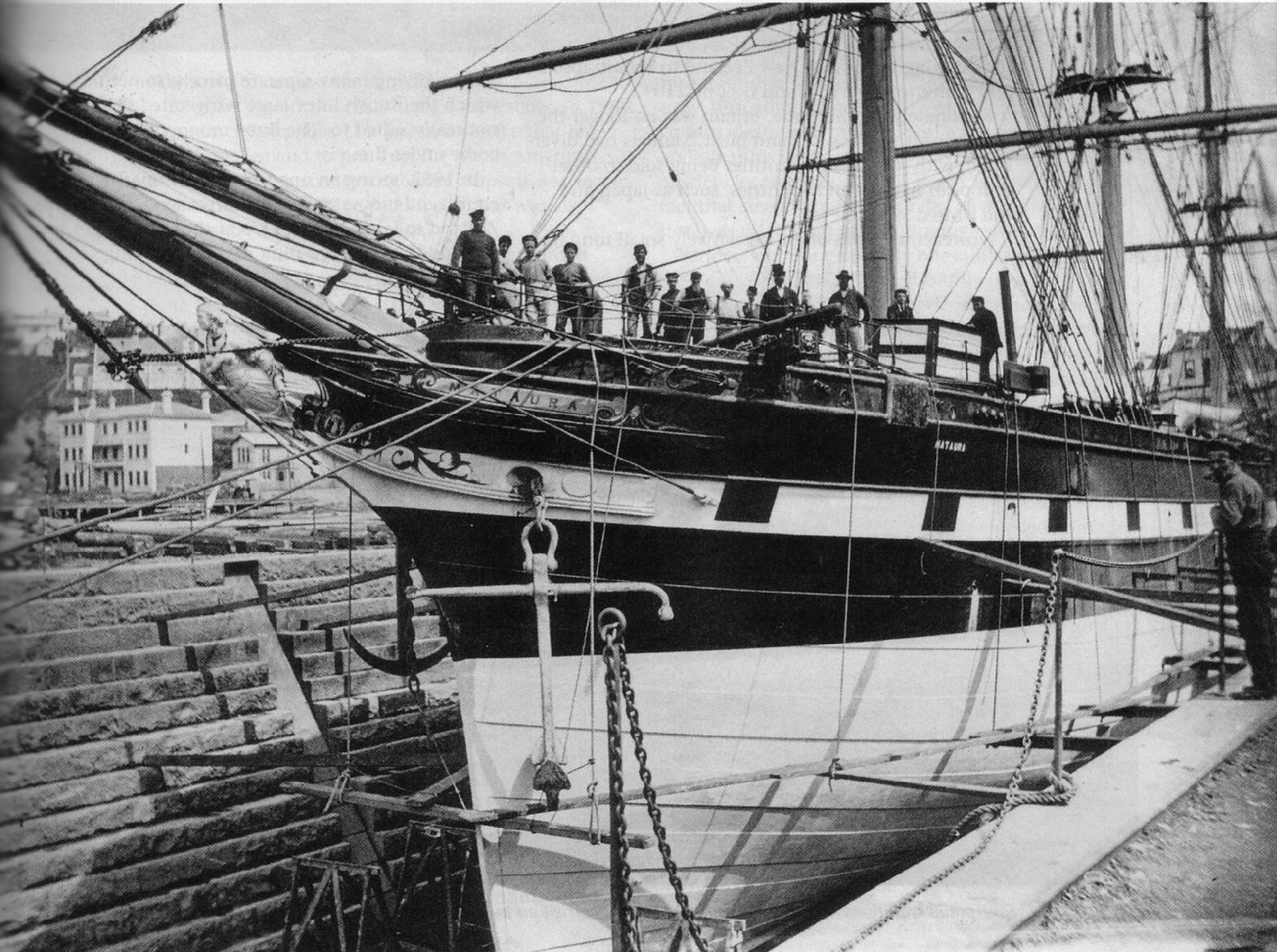
The Mataura carried New Zealand's second frozen meat shipment from Auckland

The SS Marlborough - sister ship to the Dunedin - was immediately converted and joined in the trade before the end of 1882, although beaten by the rival New Zealand Shipping Company vessel the Mataurua. The German Marsala became the first steam ship to carry frozen New Zealand lamb in December 1882. Within 5 years, 172 shipments of frozen meat were sent from New Zealand to the United Kingdom, (of which only 9 had significant amounts of meat condemned). Refrigerated meat and dairy produce continue to provide the main primary exports for New Zealand to this day.

== Return to Britain ==
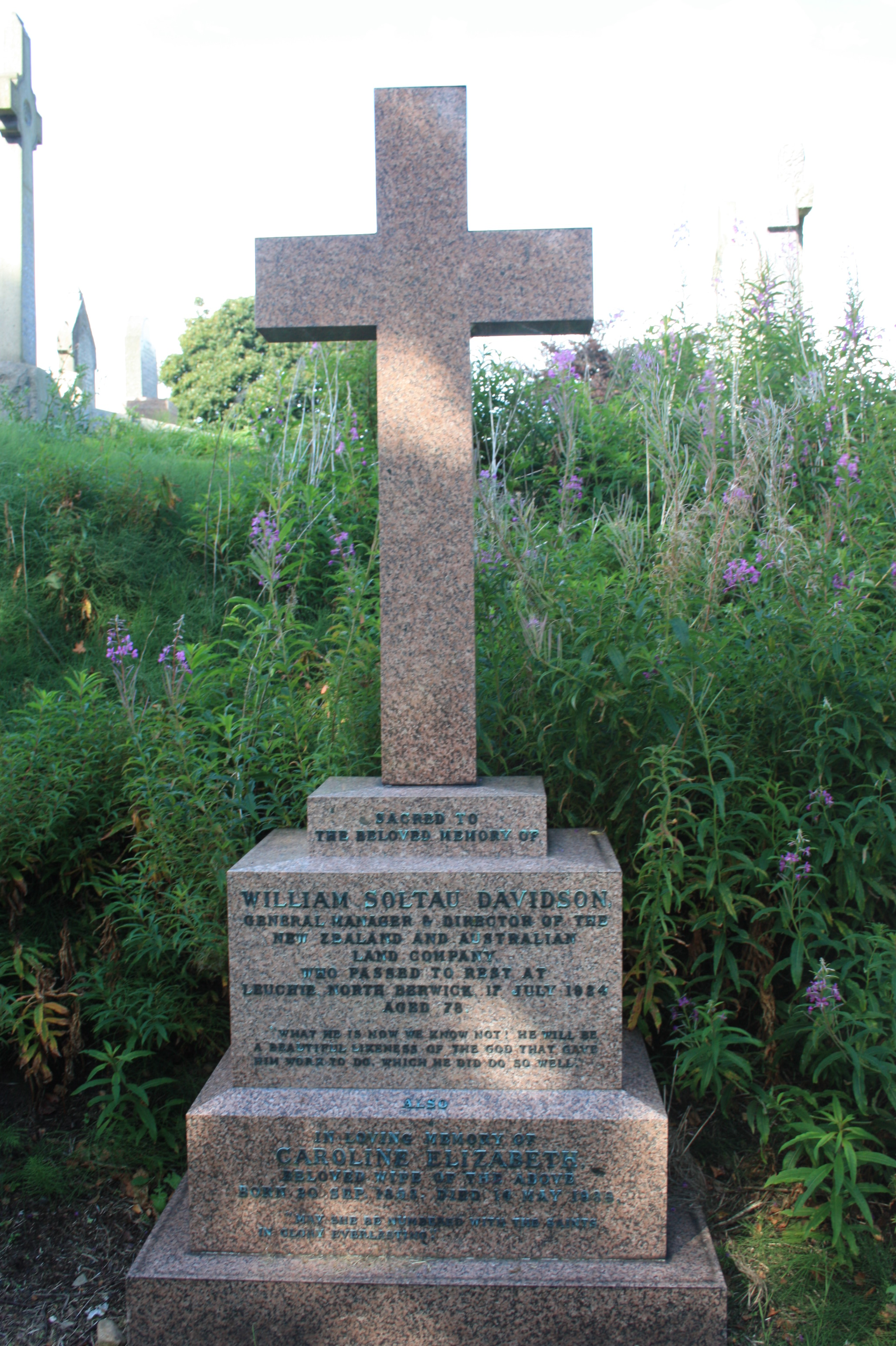
The grave of William Soltau Davidson, The Grange, Edinburgh

Davidson was increasingly based in the UK as NZALC general manager, although he continued to regularly visit New Zealand and Australia. Davidson's wife had died in 1884, leaving him to care for their daughter Jane. He became director of two companies, and was appointed to the boards of the Scottish Union and National Insurance Company and the National Bank of Scotland. His portrait was painted by Sir James Guthrie in 1918. William Davidson retired as general manager of the NZALC in 1916, remaining on the board of directors until his death in 1924.

He died at Leuchie in North Berwick on 17 July 1924. He is buried in Grange Cemetery in south Edinburgh. The grave stands on the south side of the central vaults facing the south-east section.

Davidson was posthumously inducted into the New Zealand Business Hall of Fame in 2006.

== Family ==
In 1887 he married Caroline Elizabeth Thomas Thierens. The couple had no children.

== See also ==
- Agriculture in New Zealand
