= Colin Murdoch =

New Zealand pharmacist and veterinarian

Colin Murdoch ONZM
- Born: Colin Albert Murdoch; 6 February 1929; Christchurch, New Zealand
- Died: 4 May 2008 (aged 79); Timaru, New Zealand
- Occupations: Pharmacist; veterinarian
- Known for: The invention of the tranquilliser gun Invention of the disposable syringe
- Parents: Mary Kathleen; Frank William James

Colin Albert Murdoch ONZM (6 February 1929 – 4 May 2008) was a New Zealand pharmacist and veterinarian who made a number of significant inventions, in particular the tranquilliser gun, the disposable hypodermic syringe and the child-proof medicine container. He had a total of 46 patents registered in his name.

== Biographical background ==
Born in Christchurch, New Zealand, in 1929, to parents Mary Kathleen and Frank William James, Murdoch displayed a talent for chemistry at a very early age. Although he struggled through his schooling years with dyslexia, Murdoch already displayed an interest in both mechanical and technical skills. At the age of ten he successfully made gunpowder and came to the realization that an ignition could be caused by the mixing of certain nitrates and sulphuric acid. This discovery led the young Murdoch to build a successful firearm using a wick and a small asbestos-filled hammer.

At the age of 13 he was awarded the Royal Humane Society Medal for saving a drowning man in the New Brighton estuary.

Murdoch later came to outgrow his dyslexia and went on to study at The College of Pharmacy in Wellington. Following this, he completed a five-year apprenticeship and, like his father, became a pharmacist. He later studied to become a veterinarian, as he had an interest in not only human welfare, but also the welfare of animals.

== Disposable hypodermic syringe ==
Both a pharmacist and a veterinarian, Murdoch was aware of the risks in reusing syringes. There was a high risk of passing infection from one patient to the next in both humans and animals unless the glass syringe was sterilized accurately. Wanting to eliminate these risks, and needing a more effective vaccination for his animal patients, Murdoch designed and invented the disposable hypodermic syringe, a plastic version of its glass predecessor. Murdoch presented the design to officials of the New Zealand Department of Health, who were skeptical, and believed it “too futuristic”, and that it would not be received well by both doctors and patients. Development of the syringe was held off for a few years due to lack of funding. Eventually, when he was granted both patents, Murdoch’s syringe became hugely successful, with millions used throughout the world every day. It is not widely known as a New Zealand design, although Murdoch's achievements have been covered in the New Zealand media.

== Tranquilliser gun ==
In the 1950s, while working with colleagues who were studying introduced wild goat, deer and tahr populations in New Zealand, Murdoch had the idea that the animals would be much easier to catch, examine and release if a dose of tranquilliser could be administered by projection from afar. Murdoch became experienced with repairing and modifying guns during World War II, as rifles and shotguns were not being imported into New Zealand at that time. With both motive and experience, Murdoch went on to develop a range of rifles, darts and pistols, which have had an enormous impact on the treatment and study of animals around the world.

At the time Murdoch started testing his tranquilliser gun, the only tranquilliser drugs available were curare and alkaloids of nicotine, both of which tended to have fatal reactions in a high percentage of animals. In partnership with pharmaceutical companies, he helped develop more sophisticated drugs with precise and safe reactions.

Paxarms Limited (which stands for peace and arms), Murdoch’s own company, has developed various systems for administering veterinary products to a range of animals.

== Recognition ==
Colin Murdoch has been acknowledged for his life's work. In 1976 he won three gold medals and a bronze at the World Inventions Fair in Brussels. The New Zealand Design Council has also honoured him, and in the 2000 Queen's Birthday Honours he was appointed an Officer of the New Zealand Order of Merit, for services to inventing. Time magazine included him in a list of the 100 most influential people of the South Pacific.

Despite the relative ubiquity of his inventions, Murdoch did not become rich because of them. He deliberately chose not to sue companies that violated his patents, satisfied instead that they were being put to good use.

In his final years he lived quietly in Timaru until his death from cancer.
