= Thomas Brydone =

New Zealand land company manager, farm manager and freezing industry developer

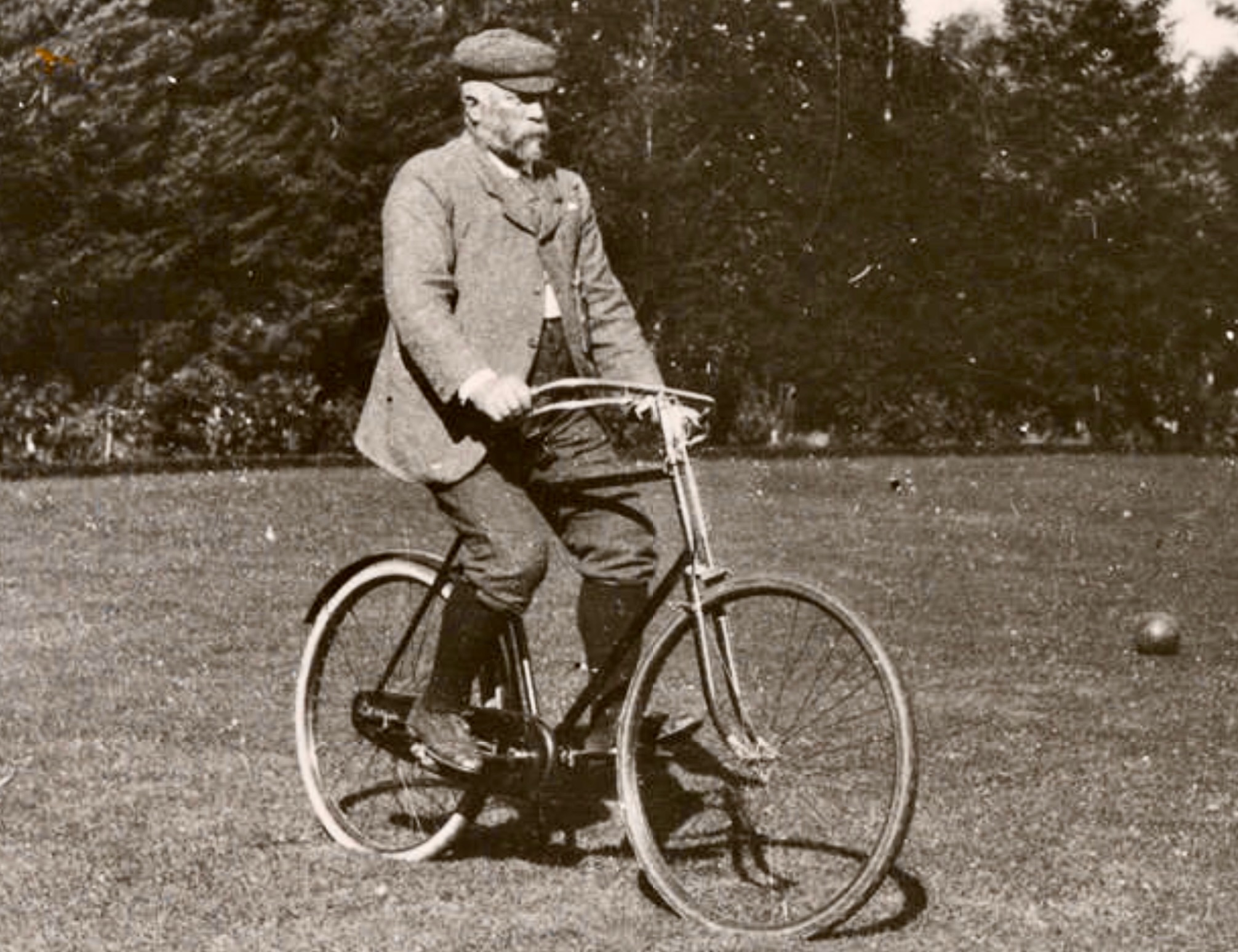
Thomas Brydone on a bicycle in 1893

Thomas Brydone (14 April 1837 – 17 June 1904) was a Scottish-New Zealand land-company manager, farm manager and freezing-industry developer.

Brydone was born in West Linton, Peeblesshire, Scotland in 1837. He grew up in Blair Atholl and received his education at Perth Academy. As a land stewart, he first worked for the Earl of Buchan and then the Duke of Hamilton. After moving to England, he worked for the West of England Land Improvement Company and then for Lord Falmouth. From 1861, he was back in Scotland, initially with the Earl of Buchan and then as a part-owner of the Young's Paraffin Oil Company in 1866 and 1867; the business failed when cheaper paraffin oil became available from the United States.

The New Zealand and Australian Land Company was formed in Glasgow in March 1866 and, by 1867, had about 123,000 acres (50,000 ha), made up of Morton Mains 4,000 acres (1,600 ha), Flemington 3,500 acres (1,400 ha), Woodlands 4,000 acres (1,600 ha), Mable Bush 7,000 acres (2,800 ha), Waimumu 30,000 acres (12,000 ha), Finlay's block (qr) 4,000 acres (1,600 ha), Hall's block (qr) 4,000 acres (1,600 ha), Edendale 12,000 acres (4,900 ha), Mataura Estate 25,500 acres (10,300 ha), Seaward Downs 17,000 acres (6,900 ha) and Oteramika Station 12,000 acres (4,900 ha). In 1867 Brydone became the organisation's superintendent for property located in New Zealand. He arrived in Dunedin, New Zealand, in 1868 to take up his roleBrydone was successful in his job, helped by his extensive land management experience in Scotland. In 1877, the company amalgamated with the Canterbury and Otago Association, with Brydone in charge of its New Zealand operations.

In conjunction with the Manager of Edendale Estate, Donald Macdonald, Brydone proposed that lime be added to the soil in Southland to improve the company's unprofitable operation in Edendale Macdonald's father in law, Alexander R Wallis of Morton Mains was also an expert in soil sciences.

William Soltau Davidson, the company's general manager in Glasgow, decided to experiment with frozen meat exports and it was left to Brydone to organise the logistics in New Zealand. It was a very capital-intensive and high-risk undertaking. The technology had been developed in Australia, but Davidson and Brydone improved the efficacy of it, creating the meat export industry between New Zealand and Britain in the 1880s.

A slaughterhouse was built in Totara south of Oamaru. The meat was shipped to Port Chalmers by rail and loaded onto the Dunedin, with the first shipment leaving Port Chalmers on 15 February 1882. The success of this venture created New Zealand's early lead in the industry. In 1892, Brydone gave a paper at the Australasian Stock Conference in Sydney, describing the immense problems that had to be overcome in the first decade of the frozen meat trade.

Brydone was involved in several companies and ran his own farm. He left for London in April 1904 to seek some medical treatment. He died in London on 17 June 1904. There is a memorial for Brydone at Totara and a commemorative plaque at the Edendale Dairy Factory. The settlement of Brydone, Southland bears his name.
