= Ashers =

Locality in Southland, New Zealand

Coordinates: 46°27′58″S 168°39′28″E

Ashers is a locality in the Southland region of New Zealand's South Island. It is situated east of Invercargill on the Southern Scenic Route as it runs between Kapuka and Gorge Road. Other nearby settlements include Oteramika to the north and Kapuka South to the south. Also south is the Waituna Lagoon and Toetoes Bay.

The area is named for William Asher, a settler who had arrived in Invercargill in 1859.

== Economy ==
Ashers is in a rural area and thus agriculture figures prominently. Significant lignite coal deposits are also located in the area. The Ashers-Waituna coalfield contains roughly 746 million tonnes of recoverable coal. Exploratory work has been undertaken, but commercial mining has not yet taken place. A common stop for tourists and locals is the old Ashers Lignite pit, of which transformed into a 16-acre (65,000 m^{2}) lakeside garden still featuring walls of lignite and retaining the original pit shape hosting a café and campervan park.

== Railway ==
On 1 March 1895, an extension of the Seaward Bush Branch from Mokotua to Gorge Road was opened, with a station located in Ashers. Trains operated from Invercargill and return only a couple of times a week until a further extension to Waimahaka opened in 1899. At this point, a daily mixed train from Waimahaka to Invercargill and return began operating. The line's profitability declined from the 1930s, and in 1951, the mixed train was cut to run just once a week as a cost-saving measure, with goods-only trains on other days. On 1 June 1960, all passenger services through Ashers were cancelled; freight also continued to remain at unprofitable levels, and the whole line closed on 31 March 1966. Some of the line's old formation can still be seen in the vicinity of Ashers.
