= Kapuka, New Zealand =

Locality in Southland, New Zealand

Coordinates: 46°28′S 168°38′E

Kapuka is a locality in the Southland region of New Zealand's South Island. It is situated between Mokotua to the west and Ashers to the east on the Southern Scenic Route; Oteramika is to the north, and Kapuka South, Waituna Lagoon, and Toetoes Bay are to the south.

== Economy ==
Agriculture figures prominently in Kapuka's economy due to its rural location. It has been the site of experimentation to improve the milk output of dairy cattle by introducing genes of European holstein breeds. Significant lignite coal deposits are also located in the vicinity of Kapuka. The Ashers-Waituna coalfield contains roughly 746 million tonnes of recoverable coal. Exploratory work has been undertaken, but commercial mining has not yet taken place.

== Railway ==
On 1 March 1895, an extension of the Seaward Bush Branch from Mokotua to Gorge Road was opened, with a station located in Kapuka. At one point, the station was actually named Oteramika. Trains operated from Invercargill and return only a couple of times a week until a further extension to Waimahaka opened in 1899. At this point, mixed trains from Waimahaka to Invercargill and return began operating through Kapuka daily. The line's profitability declined from the 1930s, and in 1951, the mixed train was cut to run just once a week as a cost-saving measure, with goods-only trains on other days. On 1 June 1960, all passenger services through Kapuka were cancelled; freight also continued to remain at unprofitable levels, and the whole line closed on 31 March 1966. Some of the line's old formation can still be seen in the vicinity of Kapuka.
