= Kapuka South =

Coordinates: 46°30′S 168°38′E

Kapuka South is a locality in the Southland region of New Zealand's South Island. It is situated on Toetoes Bay and Waituna Lagoon. Kapuka and Ashers are to the north on the Southern Scenic Route.

== Economy ==
Agriculture figures prominently in Kapuka South's economy due to its rural location. Significant lignite coal deposits are also located in the vicinity of Kapuka South. The Ashers-Waituna coalfield contains roughly 746 tonnes of recoverable coal. Exploratory work has been undertaken, but commercial mining has not yet taken place.

== Education ==
Kapuka South formerly had a primary school, Kapuka South School. It was open in the first half of the 20th century. After its closure, the building became the Kapuka South Hall and between 2006 – 2008 became a Clay Target Gun Club.
