= Timpanys =

Locality in Southland, New Zealand

Coordinates: 46°27′2.04″S 168°30′44.86″E

Timpanys is a locality in the Southland region of New Zealand's South Island. It is situated in a rural area east of Invercargill and is on the Southern Scenic Route between Waimatua and Mokotua. Rimu is to the north and Waituna Lagoon and Tiwai Point are to the south.

== Railway ==
On 16 January 1888, an extension of the Seaward Bush Branch was opened from Waimatua to Mokotua; the station in Timpanys was the only intermediate stop on this section and it was located 16.91 km from Invercargill by rail. The line was ultimately opened to Tokanui in 1911. Passengers from Timpanys were carried on mixed trains, and when the line's profitability declined, these services were cut to operate once weekly. Goods-only trains operated on other days, and they became the sole services through Timpanys when the mixed trains were fully cancelled from 1 June 1960. The line, however, did not regain profitability and was closed on 31 March 1966. Some of its formation can still be seen in the vicinity of Timpanys.
