= Catherine Carran =

Waikato and Ngāti Pūkeko; founding mother, midwife

Catherine Carran (née McKay, 1842 – 6 November 1935) was a half-Māori New Zealand midwife and nurse who spent her early life in the Waikato, and most of her adult life in the Fortrose area of Southland.

She was born probably at Putataka (now called Port Waikato), in the Waikato district, in 1842. She was the third child of John Horton McKay, a Pākehā storekeeper, and Irihāpeti Te Paea, a Māori woman whose tribal associations were with Waikato and Ngāti Pūkeko of Whakatāne. She learned housekeeping and nursing skills, and became a devout Christian. Two of her brothers became respected Māori language interpreters. Catherine married William Carran, a stock keeper, at Waitetuna, Raglan, on 29 October 1860.

In 1861 William moved from the Waikato to Archibald and James Campbell's Waimahaka station in Southland, where Catherine joined him. Within a year they moved to the ferry house at Fortrose, where William was the ferryman at the Mataura River mouth for six years. They then moved to a farm at Seaward Bush, near Invercargill. William drowned in June 1871, and Catherine returned to Fortrose. Her brother Ben McKay came from the Waikato to help her and stayed on. Catherine began nursing for settler women. In about 1872 she bought a small farm and on 11 November 1872 married William Henry Patterson, a miner from the United States. Catherine continued work as midwife and housekeeper at Fortrose. She died on 6 November 1935.
