= Kapuka =

Kapuka may refer to:

- Griselinia littoralis, a tree native to New Zealand
- Kapuka music, a form of hip hop popular in Kenya
  - Kapuka rap
- Kapuka, New Zealand
