= Oteramika =

Locality in Southland region, New Zealand

Coordinates: 46°25′30″S 168°37′25″E

Oteramika is a locality in the Southland region of New Zealand's South Island. It is in a rural setting near Waituna and Woodlands to the north, Rimu to the west, and to the south on the Southern Scenic Route are Mokotua, Kapuka, and Ashers. The major centre of Southland, Invercargill, is over 15 km west.

Before European settlement, Southland's flat plains were covered by bush – mataī, rimu, tawai, kānuka and mānuka, and by tussock grasslands, with wetlands in low-lying areas. Oteramika is part of the Murihiku Block, bought by the Government in 1853, and shares its early history with the rest of Southland. The New Zealand and Australian Land Company was formed in Glasgow in March 1866 and, by 1867, had about 123,000 acres (50,000 ha), including the 12,000 acres (4,900 ha) Oteramika Station.

No railway was ever built through Oteramika, but two railway stations were once named Oteramika. To the north Kamahi, on the Main South Line, and to the south Kapuka railway station, on the Tokanui Branch, were both named Oteramika. Kamahi opened on 7 June 1875 and closed on 31 July 1961. It was renamed in 1892, before Kapuka opened. Kapuka station opened on 1 March 1895, closed to passengers on 1 June 1960, and closed to all traffic on 31 March 1966. It was renamed on 1 November 1895.
