= Pukewao =

Coordinates: 46°33′07″S 168°53′16″E

Pukewao is a locality in the southeastern corner of the Southland region of New Zealand's South Island. It is located inland from Toetoes Bay in the very western part of the Catlins, and nearby settlements include Tokanui to the southeast, Fortrose on the coast to the southwest, and Te Peka and Waimahaka to the northwest.

== Railway ==
On 20 December 1911, an extension of the Seaward Bush Branch from Waimahaka through Pukewao to Tokanui was opened. This branch line railway linked Pukewao with Invercargill, with passengers carried on mixed trains. In 1951, the mixed train was cut to operate just once per week, mainly for the benefit of families employed by the Railways Department who lived in the area; goods-only trains operated on other days. On 1 June 1960, passenger services were fully cancelled and trains through Pukewao catered solely for freight until the line officially closed on 31 March 1966 as freight levels had not been profitable for years. Some of the line's old formation can still be seen in the vicinity of Pukewao.
