= Te Peka =

Locality in Southland, New Zealand

Coordinates: 46°31′03″S 168°51′54″E

Te Peka is a locality in the Southland region of New Zealand's South Island. It is situated on the western edge of the Catlins region, with Waimahaka to the west, Fortrose to the southwest, and Pukewao and Tokanui to the southeast.

== Railway ==
On 20 December 1911, an extension of the Seaward Bush Branch from Waimahaka through Te Peka to Tokanui was opened. This branch line railway linked Te Peka with Invercargill, with passengers carried on mixed trains. In the mid-1920s, Te Peka railway station became a junction when a bush tramway was built eastwards from it to Fortification to serve a sawmill. The tramway closed before the railway did, but the precise date is not known.

In 1951, the mixed train was cut to operate just once per week, mainly for the benefit of families employed by the Railways Department who lived in the area; goods-only trains operated on other days. On 1 June 1960, passenger services were fully cancelled and trains through Te Peka catered solely for freight until the line officially closed on 31 March 1966 as freight levels had not been profitable for years. Some of the line's old formation can still be seen in the vicinity of Te Peka.
