= Pine Bush =

Pine Bush may refer to:

in New Zealand

- Pine Bush, New Zealand, a locality in the Southland region of New Zealand

in the United States

- Pine Bush, New York a hamlet in Orange County, New York
- Albany Pine Bush, a pine barrens ecosystem near Albany, New York
