= Fortrose, New Zealand =

Fortrose
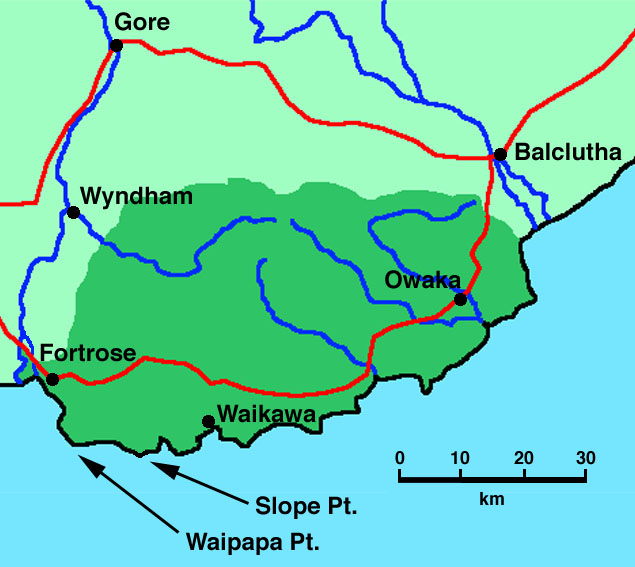
- Map of the Catlins showing location of Fortrose

- Location within New Zealand
- Coordinates: 46°34′26″S 168°47′54″E
- Country: New Zealand
- Region: Southland
- District: Southland

Fortrose is a locality on the southernmost coast of the South Island of New Zealand in the Southland region. It is situated on Toetoes Bay at the mouth of the Mataura River, and is on the far western edge of the Catlins. Nearby settlements include Otara to the southeast, Pukewao and Tokanui to the northeast, and Titiroa and Waimahaka to the north.

== History ==
From 1834 to 1836, whalers lived at a station in the Fortrose area, and the first surveys for a town – slightly to the west of Fortrose's present location – gave it the name of Russelltown. In the mid-19th century, Fortrose acquired its current name, a tribute to Fortrose in Scotland, from a Scottish drover. Its location at the Mataura's mouth meant it developed as a port to service the local region, and in 1875, a 200-foot (61 m) long jetty was built. However, Fortrose's economy declined after the Tokanui Branch railway was opened to Waimahaka in 1899 and then Tokanui in 1911, as the railway provided much quicker transportation for freight to Invercargill.

A number of Fortrose residents fought overseas in World War I and World War II. Six were killed in the former and two in the latter. A round obelisk stands in Fortrose as a memorial to the deceased; it was unveiled in 1922 in honour of the World War I victims, with the names of the World War II casualties added later.

== Economy ==
In the 19th century, goods such as grain, logs, and wool were significant in the local economy. After its early 20th century decline, it is now reviving somewhat as 'The Gateway to the Catlins'.

== Residents ==
- Catherine Carran (midwife and nurse from the 1860s; died 1935) and her husband William Carran (ferryman, 1860s)
