= Titiroa =

Coordinates: 46°29′S 168°46′E

Titiroa is a locality in the Southland region of New Zealand's South Island. It is on the eastern bank of the lower Mataura River, inland from Toetoes Bay. Pine Bush is nearby to the northeast, and Waimahaka is to the southeast.

== Railway ==
On 18 June 1899, an extension of the Seaward Bush Branch was opened from Gorge Road to Waimahaka; the only intermediate station was situated in Titiroa. This branch line railway linked Titiroa with Invercargill, approximately 36 km away by rail. Passengers were carried on daily mixed trains; these were cut to operate once weekly in 1951, and after this point were operated mainly for the benefit of New Zealand Railways Department employees and their families who lived in the area. Goods-only trains operated on the other days, and on 1 June 1960 they became the sole trains through Titiroa as the weekly mixed was cancelled. The line officially closed on 31 March 1966 as freight levels had not been profitable for years. Some of the line's old formation can still be seen in the vicinity of Titiroa.

== Titiroa Mountain ==
A 1715m Peak known as Mount Titiroa stands alone on the Eastern flank of the Hunter Mountains of Fiordland National Park and it is a prominent landmark throughout the Te Anau Basin of Northern Southland.
