= Mokotua =

Locality in the Southland region of New Zealand

Coordinates: 46°27′S 168°35′E

Mokotua is a locality in the Southland region of New Zealand's South Island. It is situated in a rural area east of Invercargill, between Timpanys and Kapuka on the Southern Scenic Route. To the south are Toetoes Bay and Waituna Lagoon; Rimu is to the north.

== Railway ==
Mokotua was once a railway terminus. On 16 January 1888, the Seaward Bush Branch was extended from Waimatua to Mokotua, with the station located 19.77 km from Invercargill by rail. On 1 March 1895, the next section of the line opened, with the new terminus in Gorge Road. Passengers from Mokotua were always carried on mixed trains, and when the line's profitability declined, these services were cut to run just once weekly in 1951, with goods-only trains on the other days. Passenger provisions were cancelled outright on 1 June 1960, and Mokotua's station catered solely for local freight from this date. Freight was predominantly for farming interests, such as agricultural lime. The elimination of passenger services did not rescue the line from unprofitability, and it closed on 31 March 1966. Some remnants of the railway's formation can still be seen in the vicinity of Mokotua.
