= Tokanui Branch =

Former railway line in Southland, New Zealand

Map

The Tokanui Branch, also known as the Seaward Bush Branch, was a branch line railway located in Southland, New Zealand. It diverged from the Bluff Branch south of the main railway station in Invercargill and ran for 54 kilometres in a southeasterly direction. Construction began in 1883 and it operated until 1966.

== Construction ==
The line was built to access timber resources south-east of Invercargill and to open up the region to farming development, replacing an earlier bush tramway that had run in the area in the 1870s. Governments of the Southland Province and Otago Province had rejected a railway line due to lack of finances and an 1880 Royal Commission did not view the line as advisable. By 1882 the Provinces of New Zealand had been abolished and the railways centrally controlled by the New Zealand Railways Department, and despite the Long Depression, funds for construction were made available. Work commenced, with turning of the first sod by the Prime Minister, Harry Atkinson, on 9 April 1883, and the first section opened on 9 July 1886 to Waimatua, followed by Mokotua on 16 January 1888. The opening to Mokotua was marked by the operation of a special train from Invercargill hauled by a steam locomotive of the 1874 J class.

The next extension, into the lower Mataura River area, was 6 mi 62 ch (10.9 km) long and not constructed immediately as there was some debate over whether the Wyndham Branch should be extended south from Glenham instead. Ultimately, the Wyndham Branch proposal was rejected and the line beyond Mokotua to Gorge Road was opened on 6 March 1895 by the local MP, Robert McNab, and when a bridge over the Mataura River was completed, a further 6 mi 40 ch (10.5 km) extension to Waimahaka was opened on Friday, 9 June 1899 by the Prime Minister, Richard Seddon. A connection with the Catlins River Branch was proposed and a further 8 mi 11 ch (13.1 km) was added to the branch when it opened to Tokanui on Wednesday 20 September 1911, making it 54.42 kilometres in total length. Although a connection with the Catlins River Branch appears logical on a map, the rugged country beyond Tokanui discouraged further extension, and the 'promise' to connect the two branches may have merely been an electoral ploy, though the Public Works Department referred to the line as 'Catlins-Waimahaka Railway' in 1910. Even the extension to Tokanui had curves with a radius as tight as 7 1/2 chains (500 ft; 150 m) and gradients as steep as 1 in 50. A ten kilometre route to Marinui was surveyed, but no further work was done and Tokanui remained the line's terminus. In 1911 it was planned to spend £80,000 on 5 1/2 mi (8.9 km) of the extension from Tokanui, as far as the AA trig point (now near the Marinui Road junction). However, there were delays and a change of government, so that work had still not started on the eve of World War 1. As late as 1931 the line was reported as part of a 105 mi 49 ch (170.0 km) Balclutha to Seaward Bush line, both the unbuilt 23 mi 63 ch (38.3 km) Tahakopa-Marinui and 6 mi (9.7 km) Marinui-Tokanui sections having been surveyed.

== Stations ==
Thirteen stations were established on the line even though none served any actual towns, and an engine shed with turntable was initially established at Waimahaka. This was also the first station on the line to actually have an enclosed goods shed. With the completion of the line to Tokanui, the locomotive depot was moved from Waimahaka to the terminus.

The following stations were located on the Tokanui Branch (in brackets is the distance in kilometres from the start of the branch):

- Appleby (3.14 km)
- Seaward Bush Township (4.59 km)
- Tisbury (6.76 km)
- Waimatua (10.88 km)
- Timpanys (16.91 km)
- Mokotua (19.77 km)
- Kapuka (24.24 km) - also known as Oteramika
- Ashers (26.03 km)
- Bush Siding (28.34 km)
- Gorge Road (30.42 km)
- Titiroa (36.03 km)
- Waimahaka (41.14 km)
- Te Peka (43.63 km) - junction with tramway to sawmill in Fortification
- Pukewao (50.57 km)
- Tokanui (54.42 km)

== Operation ==
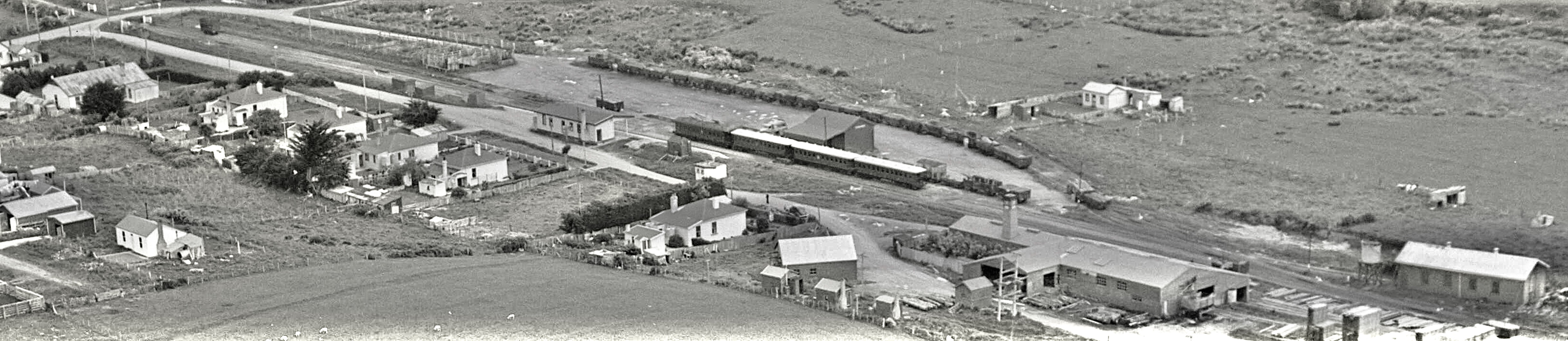
Tokanui station in 1956

The Tokanui Branch was largely served by mixed trains that carried both passengers and freight. Upon opening, the first section to Waimatua was served by just two mixed trains from Invercargill per week, but when the line was opened to Waimahaka, services changed to a daily mixed train that ran from the terminus to Invercargill and back. These trains were changed to run from Tokanui when it was reached by the line. Initially, timber was the major traffic carried on the branch, but as farming areas developed, the main traffic became agricultural lime and fertiliser in and produce of the farms out. The arrival of the railway caused the decline of coastal shipping; the opening of the line to Waimahaka particularly impacted the fortunes of Fortrose's port on Toetoes Bay detrimentally. The railway, in turn, was negatively impacted by the development of road transport in the region. The line was losing money by 1930 but no alterations to improve efficiency and profitability were made to the schedule until 1951, when the mixed service was cut to just once weekly. At this stage, it mainly operated for the benefit of families employed by the Railways Department. The daily freight continued to run on the other days of the week sans passenger wagon. Steam locomotives of the A class were the predominant form of motive power and they occasionally double-headed services during busy periods.

== Closure ==
Despite the service reductions of 1951, losses continued and the line's economic position was not helped by the improvement of roads in the area. On 1 June 1960, the passenger service was cancelled for good, and the freight train was changed to run when required, which typically meant between three and five times a week. The demand for the line was now insufficient to justify its existence, and it was initially to close on 31 January 1966, but was given an extra two months of life to allow local farmers to rail in lime under subsidies from the government.

The line's new closure date was 31 March 1966, but a final passenger excursion for local residents and railway enthusiasts was permitted to run on 2 April. Hauled by A 426, it was meant to also retrieve those goods wagons which had been left on the line. However, various problems meant that it was unable to haul the goods wagons and had to return to Invercargill with only the passenger carriages. Accordingly, one more service was required to run, and the next week it successfully retrieved the wagons and the line was officially closed. The closure directly caused the loss in lime traffic from the Browns Branch that led to its demise in 1968.

== Today ==
Through the southern suburbs of Invercargill, the former line cuts diagonally across the grid pattern of the streets and creates a green belt of parks and playgrounds through the city. Embankments, cuttings, and evidence of level crossings used by the railway can be found at various points along its length, though due to the passage of time, remnants have diminished or been wholly destroyed, either by natural conditions or in the name of development. At the site of the yard in Waimahaka, the old goods shed has been refurbished, and the station platform and loading bank are also still visible. The largest structure on the line was the Mataura River bridge, completed in April 1899 by J & A Anderson for £6486, of which three truss girders (each 80 ft (24 m) long and made of iron) of the rail bridge still span the river, but are inaccessible as smaller spans at each end were removed during demolition of the line. Another one of the branch's goods sheds survives, in dilapidated condition in Tokanui, where it is owned by a transport company who have used the former yard area for their own business.

== See also ==
- Main South Line
- Kingston Branch
- Bluff Branch
- Browns/Hedgehope Branch
- Tuatapere & Orawia Branches
- Wairio/Ohai Branch
