= Pine Bush, New Zealand =

Coordinates: 46°28′S 168°48′E

Pine Bush is a locality in the Southland region of New Zealand's South Island.

It is situated near the eastern bank of the lower Mataura River. From 1899 until 1966, the Tokanui Branch railway passed just south of Pine Bush, with a station in neighbouring Titiroa. Other nearby settlements include Waimahaka to the south, Glenham and Mataura Island to the north, and across the Mataura, Gorge Road to the west.
