= Fortification, New Zealand =

Coordinates: 46.51°S 169.00°E

Fortification is a locality in the western part of the Catlins region of Southland in New Zealand's South Island. Nearby settlements include Quarry Hills and Waikawa to the southeast, Tokanui to the southwest, and Waimahaka to the west. It is over 50 km east of Southland's main centre, Invercargill.

The area was logged by timber companies which included Fortification Timber Co 1875 and Fortification Timber Co Ltd. Subdivisions were created in 1914 under the Lands for Settlement Act and the road to Te Peka improved after 1919.

== Tramway ==
To serve forestry interests in the Fortification area, a bush tramway was built in the mid-1920s. It ran from Te Peka railway station on the Tokanui Branch eastwards to a sawmill in Fortification, and then divided into a number of branches to logging sites. The tramway's date of closure is unknown, but it occurred prior to the closure of the Tokanui Branch on 31 March 1966. Tramways to a sawmill east of Fortification Hill were shown on 1944 one inch map S183.
