= Gorge Road =

Locality in the South Island, New Zealand

Coordinates: 46°29′S 168°42′E

Gorge Road is a locality in the Southland region of New Zealand's South Island. It is on the Southern Scenic Route and is situated on the western bank of the Mataura River. Nearby settlements include Ashers to the west, and across the Mataura, Pine Bush and Titiroa to the east.

Formerly the town was known as "Oteramika Gorge" however, for postal reasons in 1896, the name was changed. The name Gorge Road derives from the former names, Gorge Run, an early landholding in the same location.

Gorge Road and Districts Community Development Area (an initiative of the Southland District Council to give local people a say in what is happening in their area) has almost 400 householders in the Southland District Council, and is the largest Community Development Area of the 16 in the Southland District Council.

== Railway ==
On 1 March 1895, Gorge Road became the terminus of a branch line railway when the Seaward Bush Branch was extended from its previous terminus in Mokotua. It remained a terminus for over four years; the next section across the Mataura to Waimahaka via Titiroa was not opened until 9 June 1899.

When it opened, the railway provided an important economic link to Southland's main centre, Invercargill. Passengers and freight were carried together on mixed trains; after the Waimahaka extension opened, these ran daily from Waimahaka and return, an improvement on the less frequent services that ran from Invercargill and return when Gorge Road was the terminus. Improved roads resulted in a decline in traffic, and in 1951, the mixed trains were slashed to run just once a week, mainly for the benefit of New Zealand Railways Department employees and their families who lived in the area. Goods-only services continued to run on other days, and after 1 June 1960, they became the sole trains through Gorge Road as the weekly mixed was cancelled. However, these service cuts were not enough to restore the line's profitability, and it closed on 31 March 1966. Some of the line's old formation can still be seen in the vicinity of Gorge Road, and Railway Bridge Road leads to the site of the no longer extant bridge over the Mataura.

== Education ==
Gorge Road School is a state full primary school for years 1 to 8 with a roll of 32 as of March 2025. It was established in 1889.
