= Tokanui, Southland =

Tokanui
- Village
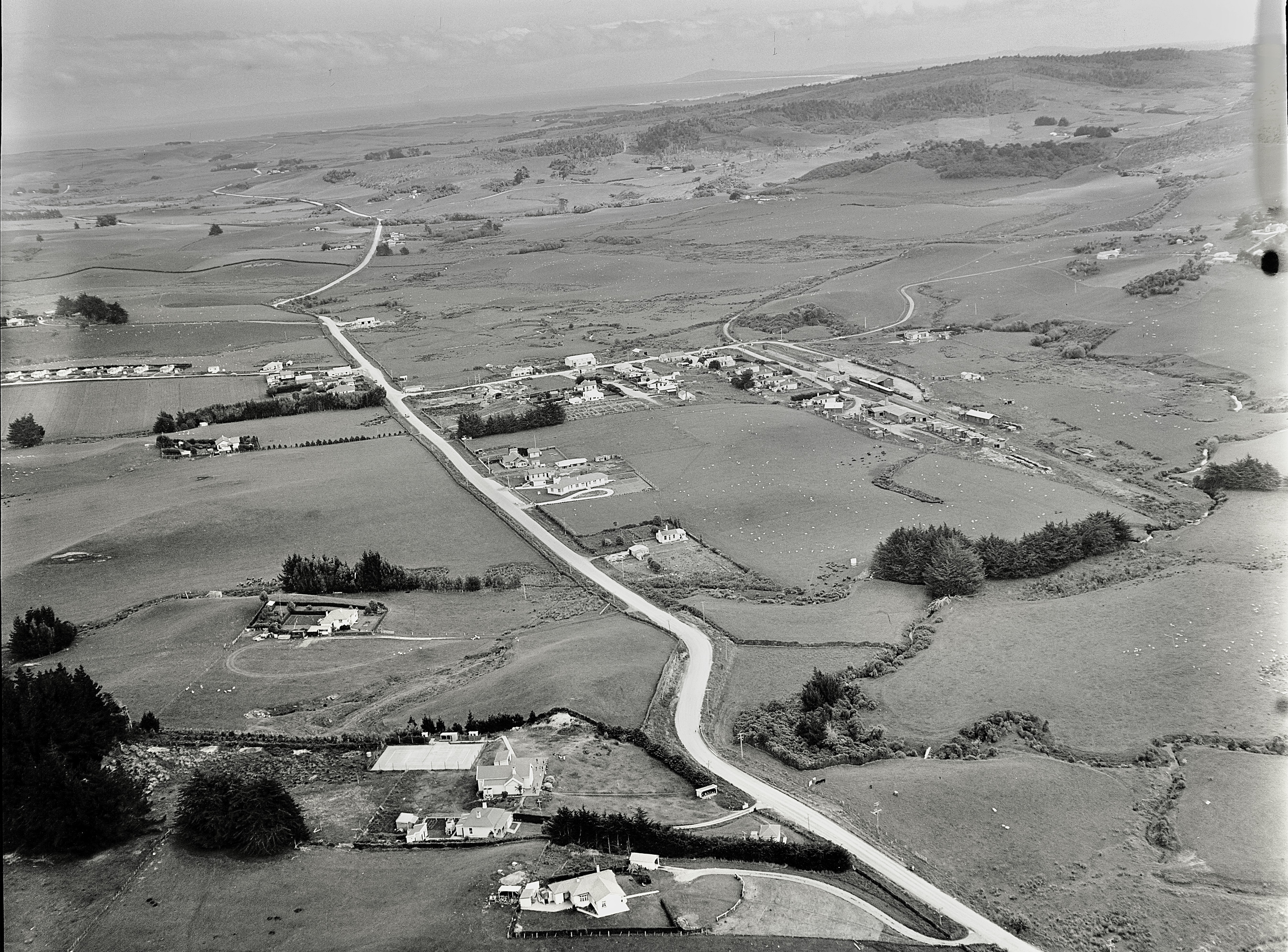
- Tokanui in 1956
- Interactive map of Tokanui
- Coordinates: 46.565°S 168.945°E
- Country: New Zealand
- Region: Southland
- District: Southland District
- Ward: Oreti Ward
- Community: Waihopai Toetoe
- Electorates: Invercargill; Te Tai Tonga
- Elevation: 47 m (154 ft)

Population (2013 Census)
  - Territorial: 111
- Time zone: UTC+12 (NZST)
  - Summer (DST): UTC+13 (NZDT)
- Postal code: 9884

Tokanui is a community in the eastern portion of Southland District Council, located on the Southern Scenic Route about 56 km (35 mi) east of Invercargill and 107 km (66 mi) southwest of Balclutha, New Zealand. The Tokanui River runs just to the north of the village and occasionally floods the lower parts, as it did when the railway yard flooded in 1935.

Tokanui has a fire station, public halls, school, store, garage, pub, recycling area and a Rugby Club. A mobile library visits once a month.

== History ==
There have been several archaeological finds on the coast south of Tokanui and a couple further up the valley, including an adze (Māori: toki) at Quarry Hills. The area was part of the 1853 Murihiku purchases (6,900,000 acres (28,000 km^{2}) bought by the government for £2,600), the injustices of which have since been partly redressed by the 1998 Ngāi Tahu Settlement. Peter Dalrymple (1813-1901) started a sheep station in 1857, which he sold in 1878. Around 1880 work started on draining what had been a wetland area and, in 1883, a road was built linking Fortrose and Waikawa, thus facilitating government sales of land to settlers. However, the road was still very muddy in 1885. A post office opened in 1887 and a dairy factory on 29 November 1897, which closed in 1945. A cemetery, opened in about 1891, where 22 graves are listed. There were flaxmills in the area from at least 1899 to 1930. A police station opened in 1918. In 1926 the first petrol pump was put in by Tokanui Motor Company. Tokanui Medical Centre was formerly Golden Memorial Maternity Hospital, named after Thomas Golden, a Southland Hospital Board member, and opened about 1956.

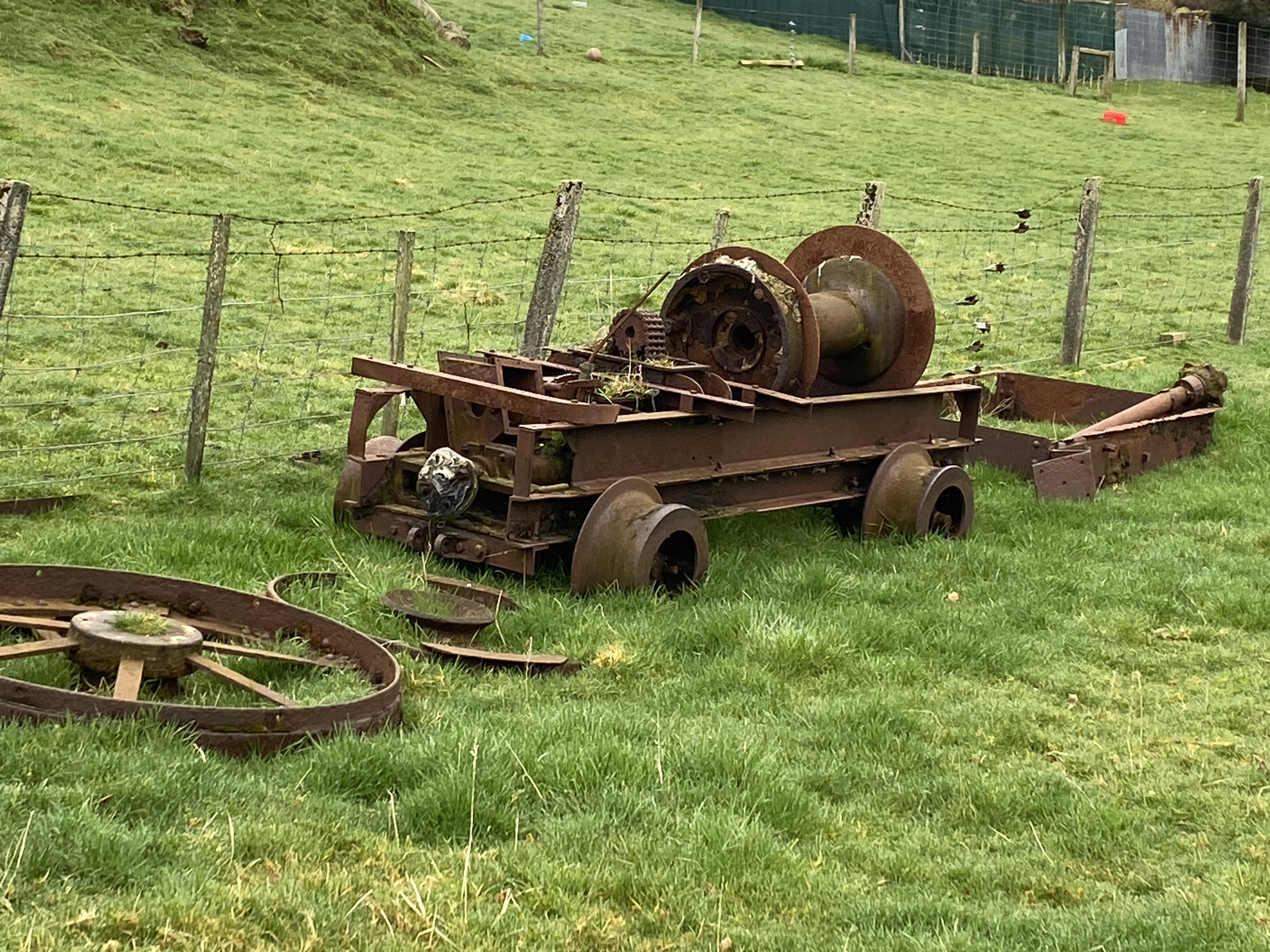
Relics of the logging industry at Tokanui in 2020

=== Sawmills ===
There were several sawmills, milling trees such as rimu. Bauchop's mill burnt down in 1912 and narrowly escaped another fire in 1917. There were 3 timber mills in 1921. Some of the sawmills were linked to their bush by tramways, between at least 1902 and 1925. One extended 2.5 km (1.6 mi) from the railway station towards Waikawa.

A woodchip mill started in the 1980s, using kāmahi and beech and, from 1985, replaced the native trees as its feedstock, with locally grown eucalyptus.

=== Halls ===
Tokanui was allocated £41 13s 4d towards the building of a 60 ft (18 m) x 30 ft (9.1 m) Coronation Hall, which opened on 13 October 1911. It was burnt down in 1949. The first replacement Memorial Hall was built in 1954, however, it was also burnt down by an arsonist in 1965. The replacement was rather larger 12 m (39 ft) x 20 m (66 ft), built on a different site. and opened in 1967. There is also a Lions Club, which was started in 1979.

=== Railway station ===
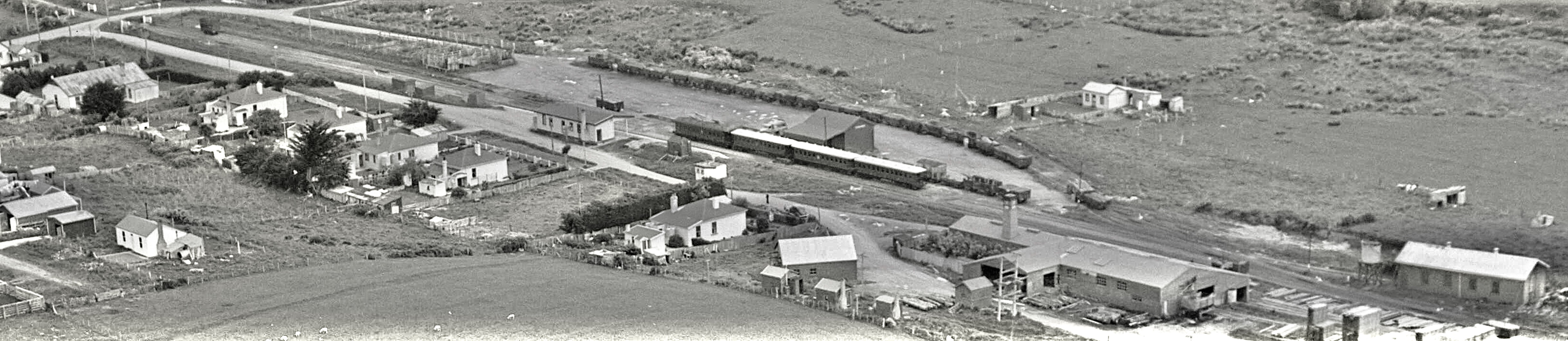
Tokanui railway station in 1956

Tokanui was a flag station at the eastern terminus of the Tokanui Branch railway line, operating from Invercargill, 37 mi 67 ch (60.9 km) away. The line was extended 8 mi 11 ch (13.1 km) and with gradients as steep as 1 in 50, from Waimahaka to Tokanui, the official opening being on Wednesday 20 September 1911, initially with trains on Saturdays and Tuesdays. From time to time trains ran daily, but mainly ran only a few days a week. Trains were speeded up in 1924, cutting the journey time to Invercargill to 2h 25m. A request for a stationmaster was rejected in 1920, so that Waimahaka remained the only station on the line with a stationmaster and all records of traffic on the line show only that station.

A 1910 contract for the station buildings at Te Peka and Tokonui was won by P A Lyders of Dunedin for £1827. They were finished by August 1911, when Tokanui had a station building, platform, 30 ft (9.1 m) x 20 ft (6.1 m) goods shed, loading bank, cattle yards, coal shed, 5 sidings, an engine shed and, in 1912, also a turntable. The engine shed closed on 1 January 1960. There was a Post Office at the station from 6 February 1953 to 31 March 1966. Although electric power reached Tokanui in 1926, it wasn't until 1932 that it lit the stockyards, 1936 when it was noted a railway house had electricity and 1946 for station lighting. There were 3 railway houses in 1912 and another was added in 1919. On Sunday, 31 July 1966 the station closed to all traffic. Apart from a large flat area, nothing remains of the station, except part of the platform.

	Former adjoining stations	
Pukewao; Line closed, station closed 3.85 km (2.39 mi)	Tokanui Branch	Terminus

== Geology ==
Most of the rocks in the area are of the early Middle Jurassic Ferndale Group, a part of the Murihiku Terrane, mainly sandstone deposited in shallow water, with mudstone and conglomerate. The river valleys are formed of recent alluvium.

== Etymology ==
Tokanui is a name made up of the Māori words for rock (toka) and large, or many (nui). It is used for 6 locations in North Island (Te Ika-a-Māui), including Tokanui, Waikato, though there the name is thought to be a corruption of tāiko nui, a large petrel. On 3 February 1912 a proposal was made to change the name of the railway station from Tokonui to Tokanui. However, for over 30 years the names were often used interchangeably.

== Demographics ==
By 1911 Tokanui had a population of 119, but in 2013 the population of meshblock 3096200 was 66 and 3096900 was 45. The 1944 map and 1956 aerial photos show settlement around the railway station and dairy factory. Since then buildings have been enlarged and altered and driveways added, but the pattern of development remains similar.

== Sewage ==
A sewage treatment plant, built in 1972, to the west of Tokanui, beside the river puts up to 55 m^{3} (12,000 imp gal)/day of treated waste into the river. The effect on river quality is claimed to be minimal.

== Education ==
Tokanui School opened about 1885, a temporary teacher was appointed in 1886 and Tokanui School was built in 1887. When it opened it had with a roll of 14 students. The school was enlarged in 1993, when Fortrose, Ōtara and Quarry Hills schools closed. It is now a co-educational contributing primary school for years 1 to 8 with a roll of 49 students as of July 2026. The 2018 Education Review Office report said there were then 110 pupils. Children are brought to the school on 4 bus routes, serving the south coast from Fortrose to Waikawa and north to Fortification. A 2009 proposal to move Fortrose students to Waimahaka School was opposed by parents and Tokanui School. Waimahaka School closed in 2012.

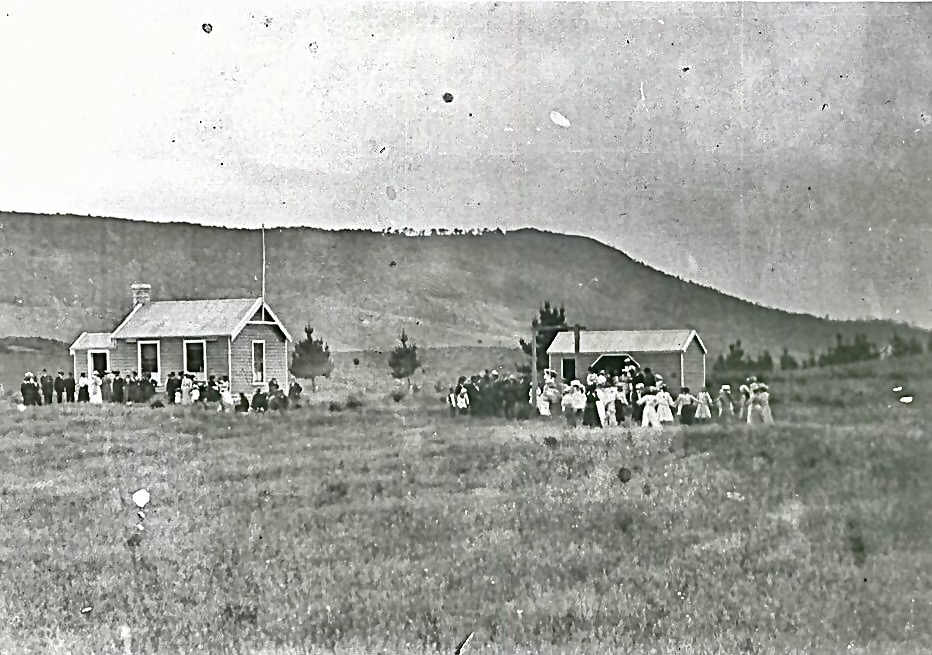
Quarry Hills school, probably in 1891

== Quarry Hills ==
Quarry Hills is a scattered settlement, 9 km (5.6 mi) east of Tokanui. In 2013 meshblock 309671, which covers a large area, to the edge of Tokanui, had a population of 69 and meshhblock 3096800, to the south of the main road, had 18.

In 1891 a post office opened. Waikawa Valley school opened in 1891 and was renamed Quarry Hills in 1893. A cemetery opened in about 1895 and a public hall in 1928. The hall closed between 1968 and 1976 and the school closed in 1993 and is now a house. A war memorial was erected in 1920. Quarrying ended about 1920 and had restarted by 1970, but the quarry is now closed.
