= Waimahaka =

Locality in Southland District, Southland Region, New Zealand

Coordinates: 46°31′S 168°49′E

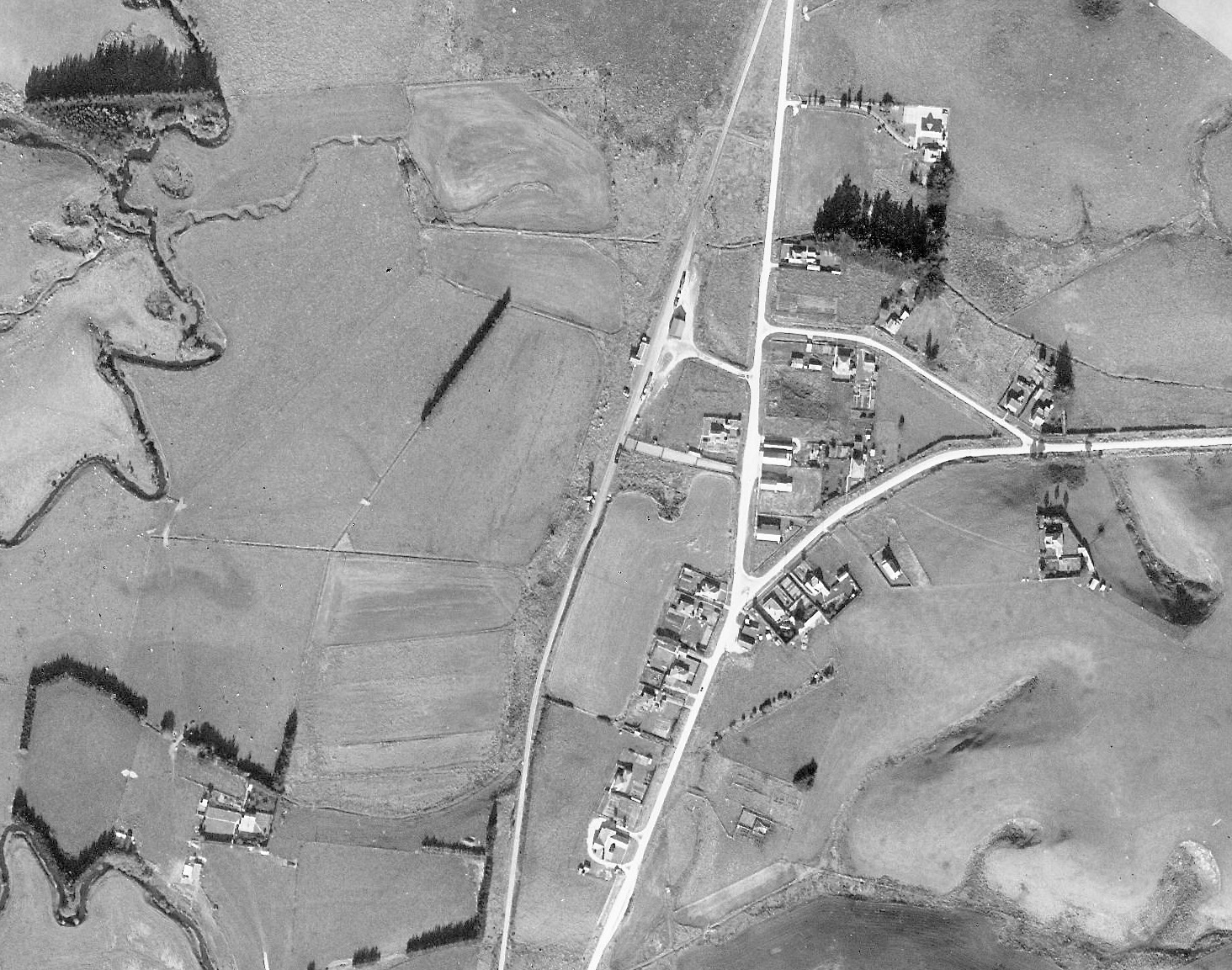
Waimahaka in 1952

Waimahaka is a locality in the Southland region of New Zealand's South Island. It is situated in a rural area, inland from Toetoes Bay. Nearby settlements include Pine Bush and Titiroa to the northwest, Fortification and Te Peka to the east, Pukewao and Tokanui to the southwest, and Fortrose on the coast to the south.

== History ==
The first Public Hall was opened in 1906 and demolished in 1972, and is now the site of the fire station. A second hall was opened in 1972, and it is currently operating. In 2020, a Historical Information Board was erected beside the hall. Information for this board was largely sourced from the local history book "A High Point of Vantage" by Marjory Smith

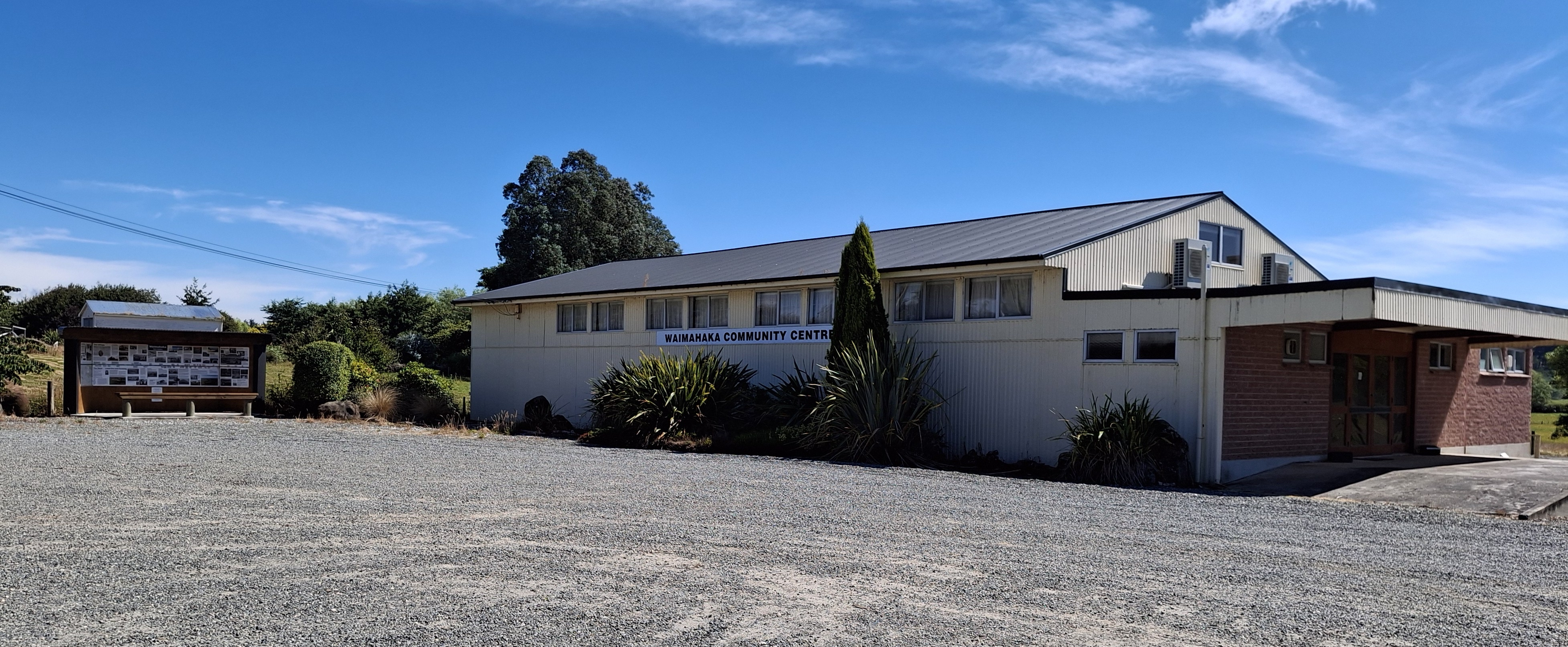
Waimahaka Community Centre 2025

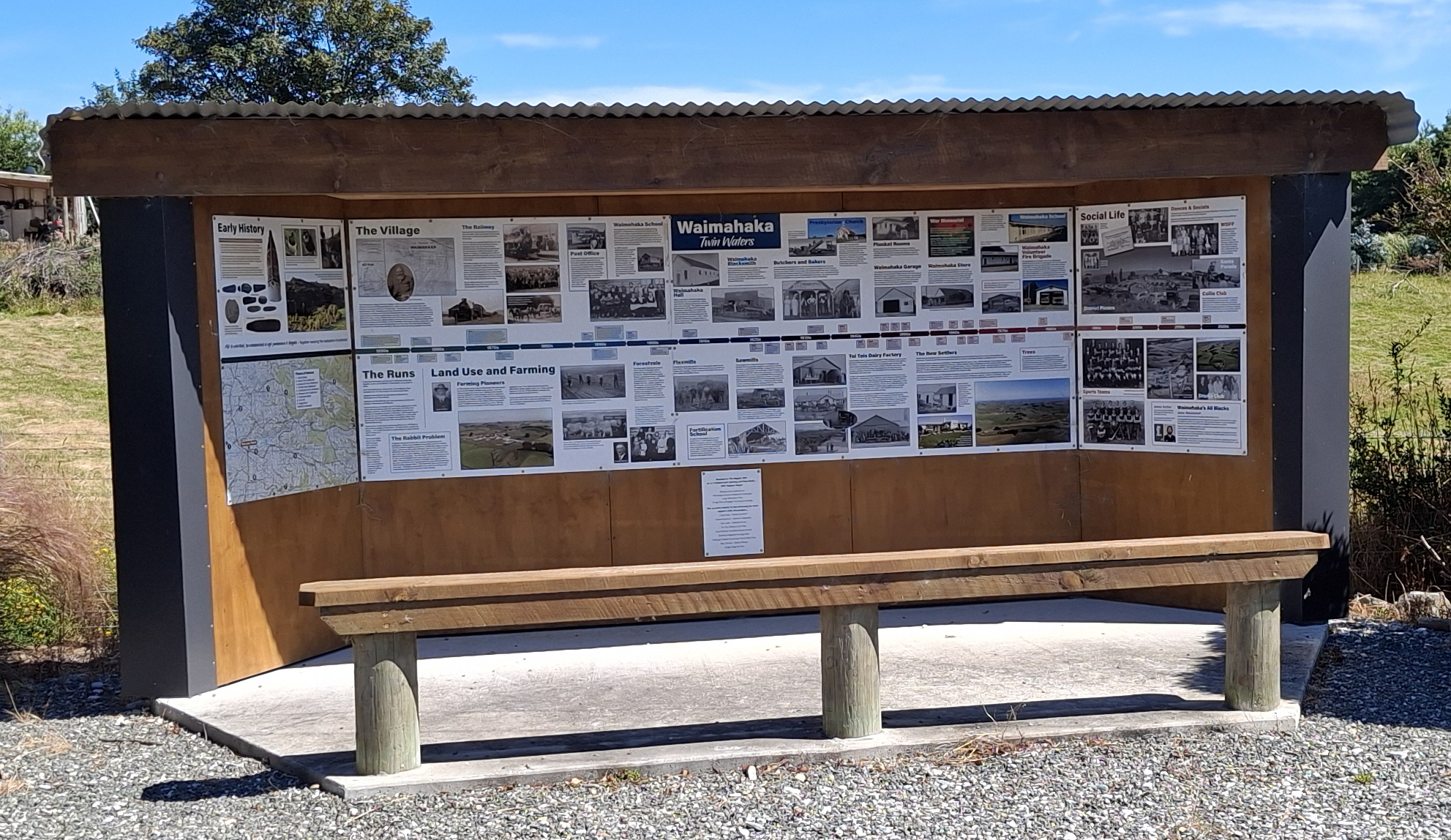
Waimahaka historical information board at the community centre.

== Railway ==
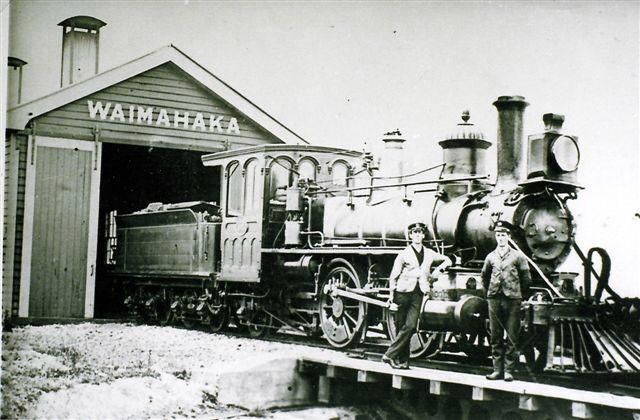
K class loco at Waimahaka

On 9 June 1899, a 6 mi 61 ch (10.9 km) extension of the Seaward Bush Branch was opened from Gorge Road to Waimahaka. This branch line railway linked Waimahaka with Invercargill, 25 mi 47 ch (41.2 km) away. A 60 ft (18 m) engine shed, 50 ft (15 m) locomotive turntable, coal store, 40 ft (12 m) x 30 ft (9.1 m) goods shed, 5th class station, stationmaster's house, platform, loading bank, cattle yards, privies, urinals and 3 platelayers' cottages were established at the Waimahaka station. In 1908, another cottage was built, followed by the installation of a telephone in 1909. The arrival of the railway spurred Waimahaka’s growth, surpassing Fortrose, as it offered faster transportation to Invercargill compared to the slower ships that serviced Fortrose’s modest port. On 20 December 1911, the railway was extended to Tokanui and Waimahaka's engine facilities were transferred there.

Passengers and freight were carried together on mixed trains that ran daily to and from Invercargill. In 1951, these were cut to operate just once per week, mainly for the benefit of families employed by the Railways Department who lived in the area; goods-only trains operated on other days. On 1 June 1960, passenger services were fully cancelled, and trains through Waimahaka catered solely for freight until the line officially closed on 31 March 1966, as freight levels had not been profitable for years. The loading bank and station platform remain identifiable and the goods shed has been refurbished for other uses. Some of the line's old formation can still be seen in the vicinity of Waimahaka.

There was a Post Office at the station from 1902 to 1953, and a new Post Office and telephone exchange building opened on 15 September 1966, after the closure of the station on Sunday, 31 July 1966. The Post Office was among many closed by Richard Prebble in 1987.

	Former adjoining stations	
Titiroa; Line closed, station closed 5.11 km (3.18 mi)	Tokanui Branch	Te Peka; Line closed, station closed 2.49 km (1.55 mi)

== Education ==
Waimahaka School operated from 1901 to 2012. The school began with more than 25 students, a teachers' residence was built in 1908, and a second classroom, play shed, washhouse, bathroom and stoves were added in 1920. The site was remodelled in the 1950s. The school moved to a new, larger site to accommodate a larger post-war roll in 1964, with a new teachers' residence being added in 1968. By 2006, the school had 16 students and featured netball fields, a rugby field, a covered swimming pool heated with solar panels, and a computer for every child. The school roll had dropped to four students by its final year of teaching in 2012.
