= Waituna Lagoon =

Lagoon in Southland, New Zealand

- Waituna Lagoon in the South Island to the south-east of Invercargill.
- Location: South Island of New Zealand
- Coordinates: 46.5662°S 168.5904°E
- Type: lagoon

The Waituna Lagoon is on the southern coastline of the South Island of New Zealand. It forms part of the Awarua Wetland, a Ramsar site that was established in 1976. It gives its name to waituna, a type of ephemeral coastal lake.

The lagoon is an important habitat for resident and migratory birds with seventy three different species being recorded. The expansion in the area of Leptocarpus rushes that has been observed over a 47-year period in the lagoon have been attributed to artificial openings of the lagoon to the sea, and the increase in sedimentation.

The lagoon is largely unmodified by human activity but there are elevated nutrient levels, sedimentation and algal blooms with a fear that it may lead to eutrophication. Awarua Runaka, Department of Conservation and Environment Southland suggest that cutting an opening through the bar to the sea helps waituna to flush itself.

== Recreational use ==
Waituna Lagoon is a common fishing and game bird hunting spot. There is a good supply of brown trout in the lake/lagoon and its tributaries with a daily limit of two trout per person per day. The fishing season runs from 1 October until 30 April.

There is a good range of game bird species, with mallard ducks being the primarily hunted species. Other game bird species hunted during the season include the shoveler/spoonbill, Canada geese (now classified as a pest species), paradise ducks and the black swan (not often targeted by hunters). Many families traditionally hunt the lake, such as the Carleen, Hourston, Lawson, McNaughton, Perriam, Thomas, Owen, Carston and Waghorn families who either have camps or live in the area.

== See also ==
- Coastline of New Zealand
