= Toetoes Bay =

Bay on the Foveaux Strait coast of Southland, New Zealand

Coordinates: 46°38′S 168°43′E

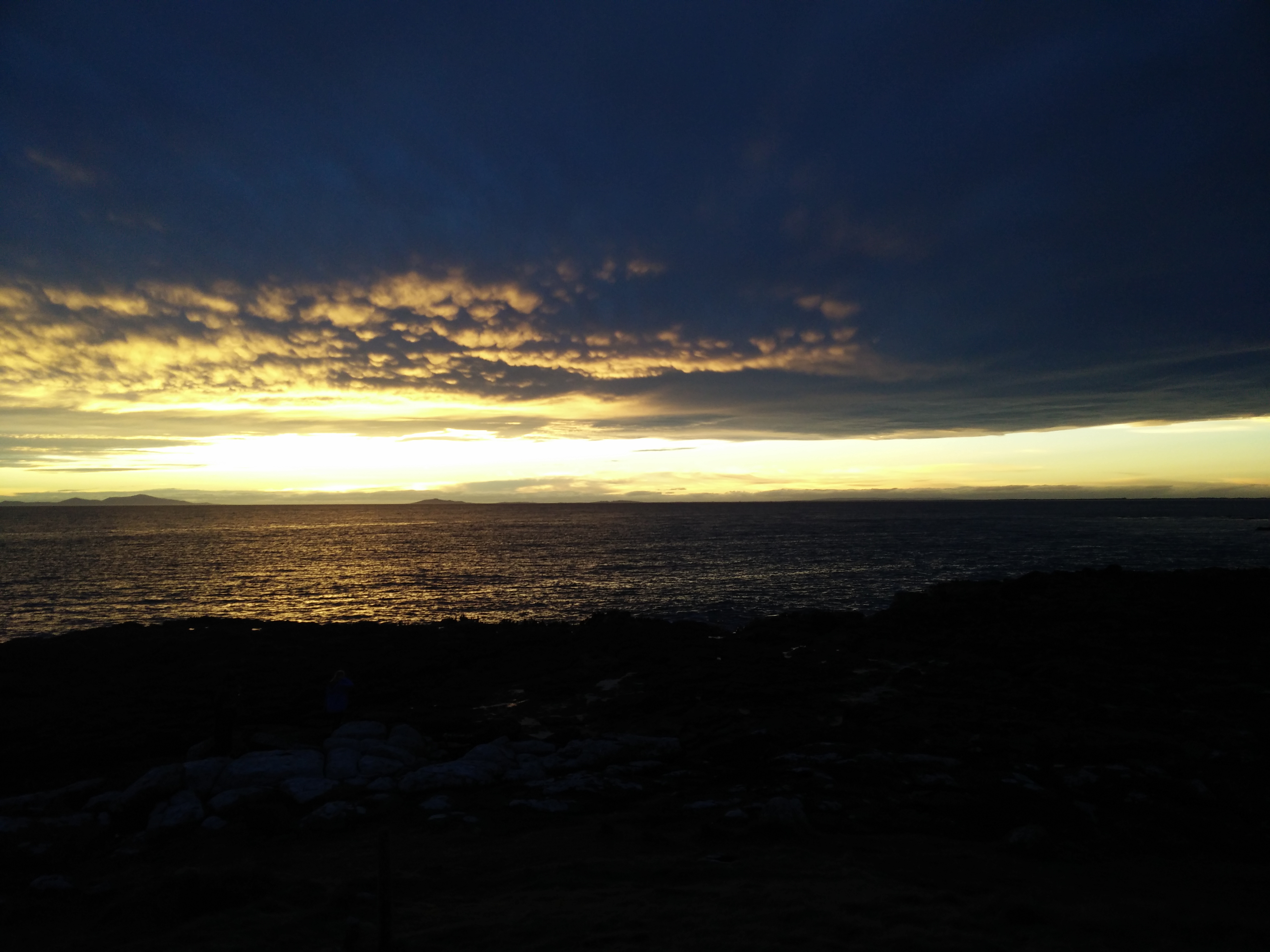
Sunset over Toetoes Bay seen from Waipapa Point

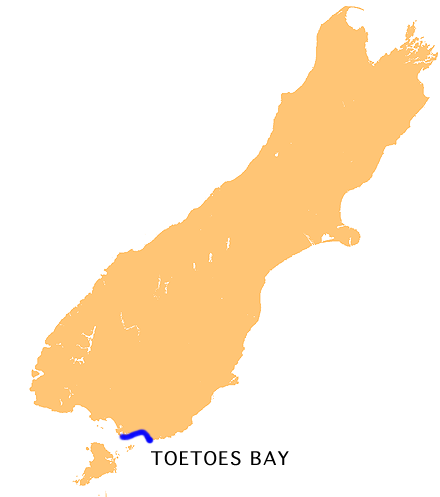
Location of Toetoes Bay

Toetoes Bay is the easternmost of three large bays lying on the Foveaux Strait coast of Southland, New Zealand, the others being Te Waewae Bay and Oreti Beach. The 240 km Mataura River drains to sea at Toetoes Bay, first passing through the Toetoes Harbour estuary. Thirty kilometres (19 miles) in length, the bay is the southern end of the Awarua Plain, an area of swampy land stretching inland for about fifteen kilometres (9.3 miles). The eastern end of the bay is close to Slope Point, the South Island's southernmost point, and the western end of the Catlins.

Tiwai Point, with its aluminium smelter, is located on a peninsula at the western end of the bay, on the edge of Bluff harbour. Waituna Lagoon is located halfway along the bay, and towards the eastern end the Mataura River has its outflow into the Foveaux Strait.

The bay gets its name from a 19th-century Māori chief, Toitoi. Whalers named the Waituna Lagoon "Toetoe's Place" and the name was later given to the bay.
